= The Human League discography =

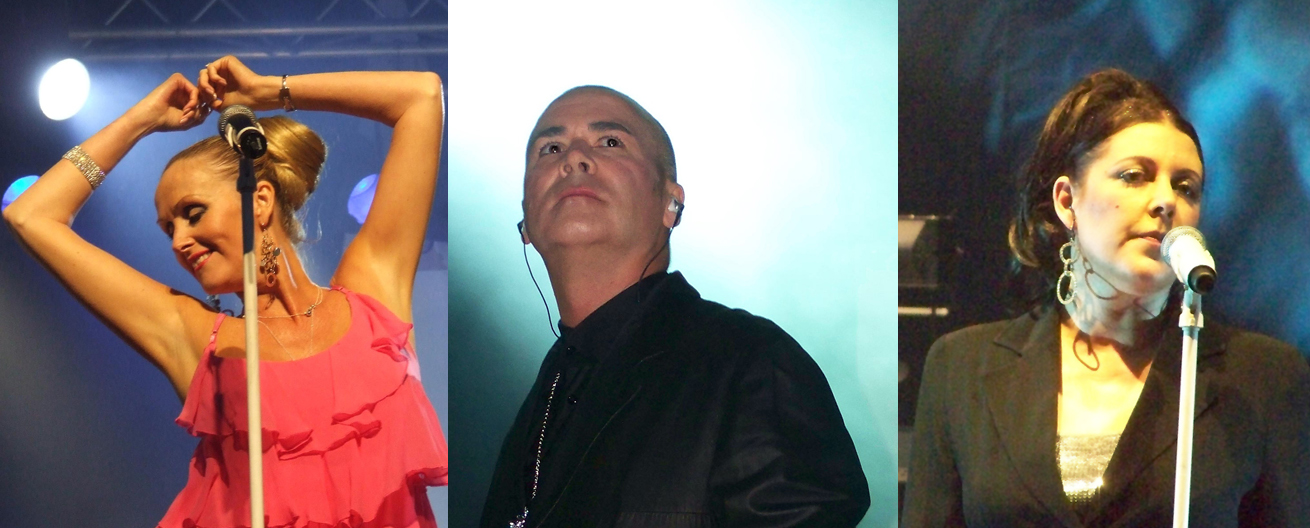
- Studio albums: 9
- Extended plays: 6
- Live albums: 1
- Compilation albums: 13
- Singles: 35
- Video albums: 6
- Music videos: 21
- Remix albums: 1

The Human League has released 9 studio albums, a live album (later reissued in an expanded edition), a remix album, 13 compilations, 6 extended plays and 35 singles.

== Albums ==
=== Studio albums ===
Title	Album details	Peak chart positions										Certifications
Title	Album details	UK	AUS	CAN	GER	ITA	NLD	NOR	NZL	SWE	US	Certifications
Reproduction	Released: 5 October 1979; Label: Virgin; Format: LP, MC	34	—	—	—	—	—	—	—	—	—	BPI: Gold
Travelogue	Released: 16 May 1980; Label: Virgin; Format: LP, MC	16	—	—	—	—	—	—	—	—	—	BPI: Gold
Dare	Released: 16 October 1981; Label: Virgin, A&M; Format: LP, MC, 8-track	1	3	1	19	15	11	6	1	1	3	BPI: 3× Platinum; ARIA: Platinum; MC: Platinum; NVPI: Gold; RIAA: Gold; RMNZ: Platinum
Hysteria	Released: 7 May 1984; Label: Virgin, A&M; Format: CD, LP, MC	3	18	43	44	—	16	—	9	6	62	BPI: Gold
Crash	Released: 8 September 1986; Label: Virgin, A&M; Format: CD, LP, MC	7	32	25	14	—	40	—	33	32	24	BPI: Gold; MC: Gold
Romantic?	Released: 17 September 1990; Label: Virgin, A&M; Format: CD, LP, MC	24	115	—	—	—	—	—	—	—	—	
Octopus	Released: 23 January 1995; Label: East West; Format: CD, LP, MC	6	—	—	76	—	—	—	—	—	—	BPI: Gold
Secrets	Released: 6 July 2001; Label: Papillon, Roadrunner Arcade Music, Ark 21; Format: CD, MC	44	—	—	64	—	—	—	—	—	—	
Credo	Released: 21 March 2011; Label: Wall of Sound, MB3; Format: CD, 2×LP, digital download	44	—	—	57	—	—	—	—	—	—	
"—" denotes a recording that did not chart or was not released in that territory.

=== Live albums ===
Title	Album details	Additional information
Live at the Dome	Released: 18 July 2005; Label: Secrets; Format: CD+DVD	
The Sound of the Crowd - Greatest Hits In Concert	Released: 10 November 2017; Label: Secrets; Format: Vinyl+DVD, 2×CD+DVD	Reissue of Live at the Dome

=== Compilation albums ===
Title	Album details	Peak chart positions		Certifications
Title	Album details	UK	NZL	Certifications
Greatest Hits	Released: 31 October 1988; Label: Virgin, A&M; Format: CD, LP, MC	3	48	BPI: 2× Platinum
Greatest Hits	Released: 30 October 1995; Label: Virgin; Format: CD, MC	28	—	
Soundtrack to a Generation	Released: 30 July 1996; Label: Disky; Format: CD	—	—	
The Best of the Human League (Note: Re-released in 1999 and 2004. UK certification refers to 2004 re-release.)	Released: 16 December 1997; Label: Virgin; Format: CD, MC	—	—	BPI: Silver
The Very Best of The Human League	Released: 14 July 1998; Label: Ark 21; Format: CD	—	—	
The Golden Hour of the Future	Released: 20 October 2002; Label: Black Melody; Format: CD	—	—	
The Very Best of The Human League	Released: 15 September 2003; Label: Virgin, Caroline; Format: CD+DVD	24	—	BPI: Silver
Original Remixes & Rarities	Released: 7 November 2005; Label: Virgin; Format: CD	—	—	
Dare / Fascination!	Released: 6 April 2012; Label: Virgin; Format: 2×CD, digital download	—	—	
Greatest Hits on CD&DVD	Released: 24 August 2012; Label: EMI Gold; Format: CD+DVD	—	—	
Gold / All The Best (UK)	Released: 28 November 2013; Label: Universal; Format: CD	—	—	BPI: Silver
A Very British Synthesizer Group	Released: 18 November 2016; Label: Virgin, UM^{e}; Format: 2×CD, 3×LP, digital download	90	—	
Essential	Released: 5 June 2020; Label: UMC, Spectrum; Format: 3×CD	13	—	
"—" denotes a recording that did not chart or was not released in that territory.

=== Box set ===
Title	Album details
The Virgin Years	Released: 11 November 2022; Label: UMC / EMI; Format: 5×LP

=== Remix albums ===
Title	Album details	Peak chart positions					Certifications
Title	Album details	UK	AUS	NZL	SWE	US	Certifications
Love and Dancing (Note: Credited to The League Unlimited Orchestra.)	Released: 2 July 1982; Label: Virgin, A&M; Format: LP, MC	3	42	20	35	135	BPI: Platinum

== Extended plays ==
Title	EP details	Peak chart positions			
Title	EP details	UK	CAN	JPN	US
The Dignity of Labour	Released: April 1979; Label: Fast Product, Virgin; Format: 12"	—	—	—	—
Holiday '80 (Note: Charted on the UK Singles Chart. Reached number 56 on its initial release in 1980, then number 46 after 1982 re-issue.)	Released: 18 April 1980; Label: Virgin; Format: 7", 2x7", 12"	46	—	—	—
The Sound of the Crowd	Released: 1981; Label: Virgin; Format: 12", MC	—	—	—	—
Fascination!	Released: 24 May 1983; Label: Virgin; Format: LP, MC, 8-track	—	38	—	22
YMO Versus The Human League (Note: An EP which is a collaboration between The Human League and veteran Japanese electropop band Yellow Magic Orchestra in English and Japanese, released principally in Japan and Asia. Co-written by Philip Oakey.)	Released: 21 April 1993; Label: Spin, Alfa; Format: CD	—	—	84	—
Dance Like a Star	Released: September 2002; Label: Black Melody; Format: 12"	—	—	—	—
"—" denotes a recording that did not chart or was not released in that territory.

== Singles ==
=== Commercial singles ===
Title	Year	Peak chart positions										Certifications (sales thresholds)	Album
Title	Year	UK	AUS	CAN	GER	IRE	NLD	NZL	SA	SWE	US	Certifications (sales thresholds)	Album
"Being Boiled" (Note: Failed to chart upon original release as well as after the reissue in 1980. It became a hit after being reissued for a second time in 1982.)	1978	6	—	—	6	10	—	—	—	—	—		Non-album singles
"I Don't Depend on You" (as "The Men")	1979	—	—	—	—	—	—	—	—	—	—		Non-album singles
"Empire State Human" (Note: Failed to chart upon original release, but entered the charts after being reissued in 1980.)	1979	62	—	—	—	—	—	—	—	—	—		Reproduction
"Only After Dark"	1980	—	—	—	—	—	—	—	—	—	—		Travelogue
"Rock 'n' Roll" (Australia-only release)	1980	—	—	—	—	—	—	—	—	—	—		Holiday '80 (EP)
"Boys and Girls"	1981	48	—	—	—	—	—	—	—	—	—		Non-album single
"The Sound of the Crowd"	1981	12	—	—	—	22	—	—	—	—	—		Dare
"Love Action (I Believe in Love)"	1981	3	12	—	—	11	—	21	—	—	—	BPI: Silver; MC: Gold	Dare
"Open Your Heart"	1981	6	33	—	—	8	20	43	—	—	—	BPI: Silver	Dare
"Don't You Want Me"	1981	1	4	1	5	1	6	1	2	3	1	BPI: 2× Platinum; MC: Platinum; RIAA: Gold; RMNZ: 2× Platinum	Dare
"The Things That Dreams Are Made Of" (South Africa-only release)	1982	—	—	—	—	—	—	—	—	—	—		Dare
"Mirror Man"	1982	2	4	7	49	1	31	23	19	19	30	BPI: Silver	Fascination! (EP)
"(Keep Feeling) Fascination"	1983	2	8	13	—	2	—	3	16	18	8	BPI: Silver; MC: Gold	Fascination! (EP)
"The Lebanon"	1984	11	23	78	—	4	18	13	—	—	64		Hysteria
"Life on Your Own"	1984	16	—	—	—	15	—	45	—	—	—		Hysteria
"Louise"	1984	13	—	—	—	7	—	—	—	—	—		Hysteria
"Human"	1986	8	26	1	5	5	16	4	9	—	1	MC: Gold; RMNZ: Gold	Crash
"I Need Your Loving"	1986	72	—	67	—	—	—	—	—	—	44		Crash
"Are You Ever Coming Back?" (US and Canada-only release)	1987	—	—	—	—	—	—	—	—	—	—		Crash
"Love Is All That Matters"	1988	41	113	—	—	27	—	—	—	—	—		Crash
"Heart Like a Wheel"	1990	29	64	43	36	—	—	—	—	—	32		Romantic?
"Soundtrack to a Generation"	1990	77	168	—	—	—	—	—	—	—	—		Romantic?
"Tell Me When"	1994	6	110	17	53	9	—	47	—	—	31		Octopus
"One Man in My Heart"	1995	13	—	—	90	29	—	—	—	—	—		Octopus
"Filling Up with Heaven"	1995	36	—	—	—	—	—	—	—	—	—		Octopus
"Don't You Want Me" (remixes)	1995	16	—	—	—	—	—	—	—	—	—		Greatest Hits
"Stay with Me Tonight"	1996	40	—	—	—	—	—	—	—	—	—		Greatest Hits
"All I Ever Wanted"	2001	47	—	—	—	—	—	—	—	—	—		Secrets
"Love Me Madly?"	2003	—	—	—	—	—	—	—	—	—	—		Secrets
"The Things That Dreams Are Made Of" (remix)	2008	—	—	—	—	—	—	—	—	—	—		Dare
"Night People"	2010	—	—	—	—	—	—	—	—	—	—		Credo
"Never Let Me Go"	2011	—	—	—	—	—	—	—	—	—	—		Credo
"Egomaniac"	2011	—	—	—	—	—	—	—	—	—	—		Credo
"Sky"	2011	—	—	—	—	—	—	—	—	—	—		Credo
"Don't You Want Me" (re-entry)	2014	19	—	—	—	—	—	—	—	—	—		Dare
"—" denotes releases that did not chart or were not released in that territory.

=== Promotional singles ===
Year	Title	Album
1984	"I'm Coming Back" (Canada-only release)	Hysteria
1994	"These Are the Days"	Octopus
2002	"You'll Be Sorry" (Canada-only release)	Secrets

== Videography ==
=== Video and DVD releases ===
Year	Title	Format/s	Additional information
1983	The Human League Video Single	VHS, Beta	Contains videos for "Mirror Man", "Love Action" and "Don't You Want Me".
1988	Human League Greatest Hits	VHS, LD	Tie-in with 1988 Greatest Hits, containing videos for all tracks on that album except "Being Boiled" and "Love Is All That Matters", plus "Circus of Death".
1995	The Human League Greatest Video Hits	VHS	Tie-in with 1995 Greatest Hits, containing videos for all tracks on that album except "Stay with Me Tonight", "Being Boiled", "Together in Electric Dreams" and the Snap 7" Remix of "Don't You Want Me". Track listing includes "Love Is All That Matters", but video actually used is "Heart Like a Wheel".
2003	The Very Best of The Human League	DVD	Tie-in with 2003 The Very Best of compilation album. 19 music videos, TV performances on Top of the Pops and Later... with Jools Holland. Bonus interview with Oakey/Gayle/Catherall.
2004	The Human League Live at the Dome	DVD	Tie-in with album of the same name.
2016	A Very British Synthesiser Group	DVD	Updated video collection as part of the boxset.

=== Music videos ===
Year	Title	Director
1979	"Circus of Death"	Russell Mulcahy
1979	"Empire State Human"	Russell Mulcahy
1981	"Open Your Heart"	Brian Grant
1981	"Don't You Want Me"	Steve Barron
1982	"Love Action (I Believe in Love)"	Steve Barron
1982	"Mirror Man"	Brian Duffy
1983	"(Keep Feeling) Fascination"	Steve Barron
1984	"The Lebanon"	Simon Milne
1984	"Life on Your Own"	Simon Milne
1984	"Louise"	Steve Barron
1986	"Human"	Andy Morahan
1986	"I Need Your Loving"	Andy Morahan
1988	"Love Is All That Matters"	
1990	"Heart Like a Wheel"	Andy Morahan
1990	"Soundtrack to a Generation"	Pete Cornish
1995	"Tell Me When"	Andy Morahan
1995	"One Man in My Heart"	Andy Morahan
1995	"Filling Up with Heaven"	Turi Meyer
2001	"All I Ever Wanted"	
2010	"Night People"	
2011	"Never Let Me Go"	
