= A Very British Synthesizer Group =

A Very British Synthesizer Group: The Anthology

Greatest hits album by the Human League
- Released: 18 November 2016
- Recorded: 1980–2010
- Genre: Synth-pop
- Length: 117:23
- Label: Virgin; UMe

The Human League chronology
Gold / All The Best (2013)	A Very British Synthesizer Group: The Anthology (2016)	The Sound of the Crowd – Greatest Hits In Concert (2017)

A Very British Synthesizer Group: The Anthology is a 2016 compilation album by British pop band the Human League, released on 18 November 2016, by Virgin Records and Universal Music Enterprises. The band supported the compilation with a UK tour that started in September.

== Reception ==
Professional ratings
Aggregate scores
Source	Rating
Metacritic	82/100
Review scores
Source	Rating
AllMusic	4/5 stars
The Irish Times	5/5 stars
The Line of Best Fit	9/10
Magnet	9/10 stars
PopMatters	6/10
Record Collector	4/4 stars
Uncut	4/5 stars

AllMusic critic Andy Kellman states it "is the Human League compilation with the widest scope", noting "The anthology isn't truly straightforward", as it changes from extended versions and edits throughout, Kellman concludes his review by saying that "That said, it is a representative introduction to the work of a top-tier synth pop group." Writing for the Line of Best Fit, critic Chris Todd wrote it "lays down each of their phases explicitly", believing that "this is the first to cover their history in such an extensive way; the esoteric cold electronica of their beginnings, the imperial chart topping phase, their rapid fall, unexpected rise at the height of the Britpop phase with “Tell Me When”, and how they managed to avoid the depressing 80s package tour circuit and continue with their integrity intact", he notes that "this collection shows off their esoteric side too", he concludes by saying that "Despite the fact that the future caught up with them, this collection shows that there remains nowt [sic] so queer as The Human League." Writing for SuperDeluxeEdition, critic Paul Sinclair believes it "seems well balanced"."

The album has been viewed favourably in rankings, specifically in rankings of the best pop compilations. In a ranking of the 20 best compilation albums, the writers of Classic Pop placed it at number 9, calling it a "thoughtfully-curated anthology".

== Track listing ==
=== Standard edition ===
Disc one
No.	Title	Original release	Length
1.	"Being Boiled" (Fast Product version)	Travelogue (1980)	3:50
2.	"The Dignity of Labour Part 3"	Reproduction (CD bonus track) (1979)	3:51
3.	"Empire State Human"	Reproduction	3:13
4.	"Only After Dark" (Mick Ronson cover, single edit)	Travelogue	3:47
5.	"Nightclubbing" (Iggy Pop cover)	Holiday '80 EP	2:58
6.	"Boys and Girls"	Non-album single, later included as a CD bonus track on Travelogue	3:13
7.	"The Sound of the Crowd" (instrumental version)	Dare (1981)	4:12
8.	"Hard Times"	Dare (1997 CD bonus track)	4:54
9.	"Love Action (I Believe in Love)"	Dare	3:52
10.	"Open Your Heart"	Dare	3:57
11.	"Don't You Want Me"	Dare	3:58
12.	"Mirror Man"	Fascination! EP (1983)	3:50
13.	"You Remind Me of Gold"	Fascination! EP	3:36
14.	"(Keep Feeling) Fascination" (Improvisation, extended mix)	Facination! EP	4:59
15.	"The Lebanon"	Hysteria (1984)	3:44
16.	"Louise" (radio edit)	Hysteria	4:07

Disc two
No.	Title	Original release	Length
1.	"Life on Your Own" (radio edit)	Hysteria	4:12
2.	"Human" (extended version)	Crash (1986)	5:06
3.	"I Need Your Loving" (radio edit)	Crash	2:53
4.	"Love Is All That Matters" (radio edit)	Crash	2:59
5.	"Heart Like a Wheel" (William Orbit remix)	Romantic? (1990)	4:52
6.	"Soundtrack to a Generation" (radio edit)	Romantic?	4:02
7.	"Tell Me When" (radio edit)	Octopus (1995)	4:09
8.	"One Man in My Heart"	Octopus	4:05
9.	"Filling Up with Heaven"	Octopus	4:30
10.	"Stay with Me Tonight"	Greatest Hits (1995 reissue, originally released in 1988)	4:02
11.	"All I Ever Wanted" (radio edit)	Secrets (2001)	3:32
12.	"Night People" (radio edit)	Credo (2011)	3:02
13.	"Never Let Me Go"	Credo	4:56
14.	"Sky" (radio edit)	Credo	3:12
Total length:			117:23

== Charts ==
Weekly chart performance for A Very British Synthesizer Group: The Anthology
Chart (2016)	Peak position
Scottish Albums (Official Charts)	93
UK Albums (Official Charts)	90
