= The Very Best of The Human League (2003 album) =

The Very Best of the Human League

Greatest hits album by The Human League
- Released: 15 September 2003
- Recorded: 1979–2001
- Genre: Synthpop
- Length: 69:21
- Label: Virgin

The Human League chronology
The Golden Hour of the Future (2002)	The Very Best of the Human League (2003)	The Human League Live at the Dome (2005)

Professional ratings
Review scores
Source	Rating
AllMusic	4.5/5 stars
Uncut	4/5 stars

The Very Best of the Human League is a greatest hits compilation by the British band The Human League. It was released in the UK on 15 September 2003 and went into the UK album charts at #24.

The album includes the greatest hits released from the band, spanning from their debut album 1979's Reproduction, to the 2001 album Secrets. A bonus remix CD is also included.

A DVD also called The Very Best of the Human League was released to coincide with the album, the DVD contains nineteen music videos.

== Track listing ==
1. "Don't You Want Me" (1981)
2. "Love Action (I Believe in Love)" (1981)
3. "Open Your Heart" (1981)
4. "The Sound of the Crowd" (1981)
5. "Mirror Man" (1982)
6. "(Keep Feeling) Fascination" (1983)
7. "The Lebanon" (1984)
8. "Life on Your Own" (1984)
9. "Together in Electric Dreams" (1984)
10. "Louise" (1984)
11. "Human" (1986)
12. "Heart Like a Wheel" (1990)
13. "Tell Me When" (1994)
14. "One Man in My Heart" (1995)
15. "All I Ever Wanted" (2001)
16. "Being Boiled" (Fast version) (1978)
17. "Empire State Human" (1979)

Bonus CD

1. "Don't You Want Me (Majik J Original Booty Vocal Mix)"
2. "Open Your Heart (Laid Remix)"
3. "The Sound of the Crowd (Trisco's PopClash Mix)"
4. "Love Action (I Believe in Love) (Brooks Red Line Vocal Mix)"
5. "(Keep Feeling) Fascination (Groove Collision TMC Mix)"
6. "Empire State Human (Chamber's Reproduced Mix)"
7. "Things That Dreams Are Made Of (Jimmy 19 The A509 PWC Remix)"
8. "The Sound of the Crowd (Freaksblamredo)"
9. "Open Your Heart (The Strand Remix)"
10. "The Sound of the Crowd (Riton Re-Rub)"
11. "Love Action (Fluke's Dub Action Remix)"
