= The Very Best of The Human League (1998 album) =

The Very Best of the Human League

Greatest hits album by the Human League
- Released: July 1998
- Recorded: 1979–1998
- Genre: Synth-pop
- Length: 69:21
- Label: Ark 21

The Human League chronology
Soundtrack to a Generation (1996)	The Very Best of the Human League (1998)	The Golden Hour of the Future (2002)

The Very Best of the Human League is a greatest hits compilation by British band the Human League. It was released in the US only in July 1998 by Ark 21 Records independently of The Human League, who were at the time signed to Eastwest Records.

The album includes the greatest hits released from the band, spanning from their debut album 1979's Reproduction, to their (then) most recent album Octopus.

The cover reuses the album cover from the 1995 version of Greatest Hits.

In 2003 a compilation album of the Human League's greatest hits with the same name was released by Virgin Records.

== Track listing ==
1. "Don't You Want Me" – 3:58
2. "Love Action (I Believe in Love)" (single edit) – 3:51
3. "Mirror Man" – 3:51
4. "(Keep Feeling) Fascination" – 3:44
5. "Tell Me When" (7" edit) – 4:42
6. "Stay with Me Tonight" – 4:01
7. "Human" (single edit) – 3:48
8. "Together in Electric Dreams" – 3:53
9. "Heart Like a Wheel" – 4:29
10. "One Man in My Heart" – 4:05
11. "Being Boiled" – 3:39
12. "The Lebanon" (single edit) – 3:44
13. "Don't You Want Me" (Snap! Remix) – 3:58
