= The Human League Greatest Hits (video) =

Video by The Human League
- Released: November 1988 & November 1995
- Recorded: 1978–1995
- Genre: Synthpop
- Label: Virgin Records
- Producer: Various

The Human League chronology
| The Human League Greatest Hits (VHS) (1988) | The Human League Greatest Hits (1988) | The Very Best of the Human League (DVD) (2003) |

The Human League Greatest Hits is a compilation music video by the British Synthpop group The Human League released VHS and Laserdisc.

The original version was released by Virgin Records in 1988, and ties in with the compilation album of the same name, released concurrently, with a slightly differing track listing and order. The 1988 version contains twelve music videos recorded between 1978 and 1986.

In 1995, to cash in on an upsurge in the band's popularity Virgin released an updated version of the compilation with three post-1988 videos as well as the 1979 "Empire State Human" video, which was not included on the 1988 version, while the Phil Oakey/Georgio Moroder "Together in Electric Dreams" was dropped. Again the video release tied in with a compilation audio album of the same name, but with a differing track listing and order.

== Track listing (1988 release) ==
1. "Circus Of Death"
2. "The Sound of the Crowd" (Top of the Pops performance)
3. "Love Action (I Believe in Love)"
4. "Open Your Heart"
5. "Don't You Want Me"
6. "Mirror Man"
7. "(Keep Feeling) Fascination"
8. "The Lebanon"
9. "Life on Your Own"
10. "Together in Electric Dreams"
11. "Louise"
12. "Human"

== Track listing (1995 release) ==
Cover of 1995 version

1. "Circus of Death"
2. "Empire State Human"
3. "The Sound of the Crowd" (Top of the Pops)
4. "Love Action (I Believe in Love)"
5. "Open Your Heart"
6. "Don't You Want Me"
7. "Mirror Man"
8. "(Keep Feeling) Fascination"
9. "The Lebanon"
10. "Life on Your Own"
11. "Louise"
12. "Human"
13. "I Need Your Loving"
14. "Love Is All That Matters" listed, but actually "Heart Like a Wheel" on tape
15. "Soundtrack to a Generation"
16. "Tell Me When"

== Audio album ==
For the audio album of the same name that accompanied each video, see
