= Greatest Hits (The Human League album) =

Greatest hits album by the Human League
- Released: 31 October 1988 (original version); 30 October 1995 (updated version)
- Recorded: 1978–1995
- Genre: Synth-pop; electronic; new wave
- Label: Virgin
- Producer: Various

The Human League chronology
| Crash (1986) | Greatest Hits (1988) | Romantic? (1990) |

The Human League chronology
| Octopus (1995) | Greatest Hits (1995) | Secrets (2001) |

Alternative cover
- Cover of 1995 version

Professional ratings
Review scores
| Source | Rating |
|---|---|
| AllMusic (1988) | 4.5/5 stars |
| AllMusic (1996) | 3/5 stars |
| Robert Christgau | B+ |
| Music Week | 4/5 |
| NME | 6/10 |
| The Rolling Stone Album Guide | 3.5/5 stars |
| Select | 2/5 |

Greatest Hits is a compilation album by the English synth-pop band the Human League, released on 31 October 1988 by Virgin Records. It contains 13 singles released by the band, spanning from their debut single (1978's "Being Boiled") to their most recent album at the time (1986's Crash), as well as lead singer Philip Oakey's collaboration with Giorgio Moroder, "Together in Electric Dreams" (1984). The album reached No. 3 in the UK.

On 30 October 1995, to cash in on the band's renewed success at that time, Virgin released an updated Greatest Hits with a new cover and three post-1988 tracks added: "Tell Me When" (from the 1995 Octopus album), "Stay with Me Tonight" (a brand new track, later released as a single) and a new remix of "Don't You Want Me" by German group Snap!.

== Track listing ==
=== Original 1988 track listing ===
(Virgin HLCD1 - 259 355-222)

1. "Mirror Man" (Burden, Callis, Oakey) – 3:49 from Fascination!
2. "(Keep Feeling) Fascination" (Callis, Oakey) – 3:43 from Fascination!
3. "The Sound of the Crowd" (Burden, Oakey) – 3:56 from Dare
4. "The Lebanon" (Callis, Oakey) – 3:43 from Hysteria
5. "Human" (Jimmy Jam and Terry Lewis) – 3:46 from Crash
6. "Together in Electric Dreams" (Moroder, Oakey) – 3:53 from Philip Oakey & Giorgio Moroder and Electric Dreams
7. "Don't You Want Me" (Callis, Oakey, Wright) – 3:57 from Dare
8. "Being Boiled" (Marsh, Oakey, Ware) – 3:38 Non-album single
9. "Love Action (I Believe in Love)" (Burden, Oakey) – 3:50 from Dare
10. "Louise" (Callis, Oakey, Wright) – 4:55 from Hysteria
11. "Open Your Heart" (Callis, Oakey) – 3:55 from Dare
12. "Love Is All That Matters" (Jimmy Jam and Terry Lewis) – 4:06 from Crash
13. "Life on Your Own" (Callis, Oakey, Wright) – 4:05 from Hysteria
- Note: Track 8 is the original version of "Being Boiled" and was released on the Fast Product Label.
- Note: The Chilean cassette release (EMI Odeón Chilena - Virgin 105575), and the North American CD release (A&M Records - 7502152272) dropped the track "Together in Electric Dreams".

=== Updated 1995 track listing ===
(Virgin CDV 2792 - 724384094621)

1. "Don't You Want Me" (Callis, Oakey, Wright) (1981) – 3:59 from Dare
2. "Love Action (I Believe in Love)" (Burden, Oakey) (1981) – 3:52 from Dare
3. "Mirror Man" (Burden, Callis, Oakey) (1982) – 3:52 from Fascination!
4. "Tell Me When" (Beckett, Oakey) (1994) – 4:43 from Octopus
5. "Stay with Me Tonight" (Oakey, Stanley) (1995) – 4:01 Previously unreleased
6. "Open Your Heart" (Callis, Oakey) (1981) – 3:56 from Dare
7. "(Keep Feeling) Fascination" (Callis, Oakey) (1983) – 3:45 from Fascination!
8. "The Sound of the Crowd" (Burden, Oakey) (1981) – 3:57 from Dare
9. "Being Boiled" (Marsh, Oakey, Ware) (1978) – 3:39 Non-album single
10. "The Lebanon" (Callis, Oakey) (1984) – 3:43 from Hysteria
11. "Love Is All That Matters" (Jimmy Jam and Terry Lewis) (1987) – 4:06 from Crash
12. "Louise" (Callis, Oakey, Wright) (1984) – 4:57 from Hysteria
13. "Life on Your Own" (Callis, Oakey, Wright) (1984) – 4:05 from Hysteria
14. "Together In Electric Dreams" (Moroder, Oakey) (1984) – 3:53 from Philip Oakey & Giorgio Moroder and Electric Dreams
15. "Human" (Jimmy Jam and Terry Lewis) (1986) – 3:49 from Crash
16. "Don't You Want Me" (Snap 7″ Remix) (1995) – 3:58 Previously unreleased

== Charts ==
=== Weekly charts ===
1988–1989 weekly chart performance for original Greatest Hits
| Chart (1988–1989) | Peak position |
|---|---|
| European Albums (Music & Media) | 15 |
| New Zealand Albums (RMNZ) | 48 |
| UK Albums (Official Charts) | 3 |

1995 weekly chart performance for updated Greatest Hits
| Chart (1995) | Peak position |
|---|---|
| UK Albums (Official Charts) | 28 |

2025 weekly chart performance for updated Greatest Hits
| Chart (1995) | Peak position |
|---|---|
| Greek Albums (IFPI) | 99 |

=== Year-end charts ===
1988 year-end chart performance for original Greatest Hits
| Chart (1988) | Position |
|---|---|
| UK Albums (Gallup) | 38 |

1995 year-end chart performance for updated Greatest Hits
| Chart (1995) | Position |
|---|---|
| UK Albums (OCC) | 95 |

== Certifications ==
Certifications for Greatest Hits
| Region | Certification | Certified units/sales |
|---|---|---|
| United Kingdom (BPI) | 2× Platinum | 600,000^{^} |
^{^} Shipments figures based on certification alone.

== Video release ==
To accompany both the 1988 and 1995 versions of the album Virgin also released VHS video tape compilations.
