= The Very Best of The Human League (video) =

The Very Best of the Human League (DVD)

Video by The Human League
- Released: 29 September 2003
- Recorded: 1978–2003
- Genre: Synthpop
- Length: 1:56:00
- Label: Virgin Records
- Producer: Jason Day

The Human League chronology
The Human League Greatest Hits (VHS) (1996)	The Very Best of the Human League (DVD) (2003)	The Human League Live at the Dome (DVD) (2004)

Professional ratings
Review scores
Source	Rating
AllMusic	link

The Very Best of the Human League is a DVD by veteran British Synthpop group The Human League, containing most of the band's music videos recorded up to that point, digitally re-mastered. The only music video missing is Filling up with Heaven from 1995 which was excluded due to a licensing fee dispute between Virgin Records and EastWest

The DVD also contains as bonus material 4 notable appearances on UK BBC1 flagship music programme Top of the Pops and two songs from a live set performed on BBC2 programme Later with Jools Holland in 1996.

Also included is an interview of band principals Philip Oakey, Susan Ann Sulley and Joanne Catherall; conducted by Simon Price.

== Contents ==
=== Main track listing ===
1. "Circus of Death" 4:38
2. "Empire State Human" 3:17
3. "Love Action (I Believe in Love)" 3:50
4. "Open Your Heart" 3:55
5. "Don't You Want Me" 3:57
6. "Mirror Man" 3:50
7. "(Keep Feeling) Fascination" 3:44
8. "The Lebanon" 3:43
9. "Life On Your Own" 4:04
10. "Together In Electric Dreams" 3:52
11. "Louise" 4:55
12. "Human" 3:47
13. "I Need Your Loving" 3:43
14. "Love Is All That Matters" 4:04
15. "Heart Like A Wheel" 4:29
16. "Soundtrack to a Generation" 4:36
17. "Tell Me When" 4:43
18. "One Man in My Heart" 4:03
19. "All I Ever Wanted" 3:54

=== Bonus 'Top of the Pops' tracks ===
1. "The Sound of the Crowd" (originally transmitted - 30 April 1981)
2. "Love Action (I Believe in Love)" (originally transmitted - 6 August 1981)
3. "Open Your Heart" (originally transmitted - 8 October 1981)
4. "Dont You Want Me" (originally transmitted - 24 December 1981)

=== Bonus 'Later with Jools Holland' tracks ===
1. "The Stars are Going Out" (originally transmitted - 25 November 1995)
2. "The Sound of the Crowd" (originally transmitted - 25 November 1995)

=== Bonus interview track ===
1. Oakey/Sulley/Catherall interview by Simon Price (recorded Sheffield 23 July 2003)

=== Extras ===
- Virgin Records Discography
- Screensaver
- Wallpaper
