= Soundtrack to a Generation =

Greatest hits album by The Human League
- Released: 30 July 1996
- Genre: Synth-pop
- Length: 52:39
- Label: Disky Records

The Human League chronology
Octopus (1995)	Soundtrack to a Generation (1996)	Secrets (2001)

Soundtrack to a Generation is a compilation album by British band The Human League. It was released in Europe on 30 July 1996.

The album includes some of the hit singles released by the band punctuated with lesser known album tracks. Tracks are taken from Reproduction, Dare, Hysteria, Crash and Romantic?.

The album was released as a commercial venture by Disky Records completely independently of The Human League, to cash in on the success of their studio album Octopus in the charts at the time.

== Track listing ==
1. "Human" (Single Edit) – 3:45
2. "Kiss the Future" – 4:12
3. "Together in Electric Dreams" – 3:53
4. "Are You Ever Coming Back?" – 4:52
5. "Betrayed" – 4:06
6. "Hard Times" – 5:05
7. "Get It Right This Time" – 4:12
8. "I Need Your Loving" – 3:43
9. "Do or Die" – 5:23
10. "Rebound" – 3:57
11. "Soundtrack to a Generation" – 4:36
12. "Empire State Human" – 3:10
13. "Real Thing" – 4:19
14. "Don't You Know I Want You" – 3:10
