= The Very Best of The Human League =

The Very Best of The Human League may refer to:

- The Very Best of The Human League (1998 album)
- The Very Best of The Human League (2003 album)
- The Very Best of The Human League (video)
