= The Things That Dreams Are Made Of =

- Picture sleeve for the 2008 UK single release containing remixes of the song

Song by the Human League

from the album Dare
- Released: 16 October 1981
- Recorded: March–September 1981
- Studio: Genetic Sound (Streatley, Berkshire)
- Genre: Synth-pop; new wave
- Length: 4:14
- Label: Virgin
- Songwriters: Philip Oakey; Philip Adrian Wright
- Producer: Martin Rushent

The Human League singles chronology
"Love Me Madly?" (2003)	"The Things That Dreams are Made Of" (remixes) (2008)	"Night People" (2010)

"The Things That Dreams Are Made Of" is a song by the English synth-pop band the Human League. It was originally recorded for the band's third studio album Dare (1981), but was only released as a single in South Africa. Various remixes were released as a dance extended play (EP) single in February 2008 which reached number two in the official UK Dance Chart.

== Background ==
The song is the opening track on the Human League's third studio album Dare (1981), recorded at Genetic Studios in the summer of 1981. It was produced by Martin Rushent. The song is a tribute to the simple pleasures in life which are then juxtaposed against a greater ambition. Philip Oakey namechecks some of his and Philip Adrian Wright's favourite things, an eclectic list from ice cream to Norman Wisdom and the names of the band members of the American punk rock band Ramones. Wright called the song a metaphor for the band's ambition in 1981. Backing vocals are performed by Susan Ann Sulley and Joanne Catherall (then 18-year-olds who had just left school) who as of 2025, together with Oakey, are the only remaining band members from the original Dare line-up.

Since the recording of Dare, the Human League have frequently played the song live. It was the opening track of performances on the Dare '07 tour.

The first remix of the song appeared on the band's remix album Love and Dancing (1982), which contained remixes of various tracks from the band's Dare period. In August 2003, a mash-up of the instrumentation of "The Things That Dreams Are Made Of" and the lyrics to the S.O.S. Band's 1986 song "The Finest" was released as a single under the title "Finest Dreams". Produced by Richard X, the song featured the American singer Kelis on lead vocals. The song reached #8 on UK singles chart. It appeared on Richard X's debut compilation album Richard X Presents His X-Factor Vol. 1 (2003.

In 2007, Martin Rushent's newly resurrected Genetic Recordings label released a limited edition extended play (EP) of the song containing the 'More of Mix' and 'Justus Köncke Vocal Mix Edit'. Concurrently Hooj Choons issued a remix of the song by the British/Canadian DJ and producer Tommy Bisdee aka Kissy Sell Out. Realising that the song had commercial selling power, Hooj Choons then released a full commercial version on 21 January 2008.

Separate to the Hooj release, a version of the song remixed by the English electronic music duo Groove Armada, appeared on their compilation album Late Night Tales: Groove Armada, released 12 March 2008 by Azuli Records.

Although an officially released Human League single more than a quarter of a century after its first appearance on Dare, the band themselves did not initiate its release and have had nothing to do with the record's promotion. The track became popular with DJs and in clubs, gaining its own momentum through radio play on UK national BBC Radio 1. After release it reached number two on the UK Dance Chart and number 17 on the UK Indie Chart in February 2008. It was the first return to the charts for the Human League since their single "All I Ever Wanted" in 2001.

== Track listing ==
1. "The Things That Dreams Are Made Of" (original dub), mixed by Martin Rushent A
2. "The Things That Dreams Are Made Of" (Justus Köhncke dub), mixed by Justus Köhncke A
3. "The Things That Dreams Are Made Of" (Richard Stone mix), mixed by Richard Stone B

== Use in film and television ==
- In the 1982 BBC2 sitcom The Young Ones, the song is featured in the episode "Interesting".
- The song is played in an early scene in the American romantic drama film Longtime Companion (1989), which dealt with the 1980s AIDS epidemic. The scene is set in early July 1981, which presents an anachronism as the song was not released (on the Dare album) until October 1981, and even later than that in the US where the film is set.
- In 2009, the song was featured in The Kevin Bishop Show Series 2, Episode 5.
- The song was frequently used during the 1980s in the BBC2 weekly magazine-style television show Ski Sunday as incidental music.
