= Filling Up with Heaven =

1995 single by the Human League

Single by the Human League

from the album Octopus
- B-side: "John Cleese; Is He Funny?"
- Released: 5 June 1995
- Studio: Human League (Sheffield, England)
- Length: 4:21
- Label: East West
- Songwriters: Philip Oakey; Ian Stanley
- Producer: Ian Stanley

The Human League singles chronology
"One Man in My Heart" (1995)	"Filling Up with Heaven" (1995)	"Stay with Me Tonight" (1996)

Music video
- "Filling Up with Heaven" on YouTube

"Filling Up with Heaven" is a song by English synth-pop band the Human League, released as the third and final single from their seventh full-length studio album, Octopus (1995). It was jointly written by lead singer Philip Oakey and producer Ian Stanley (formerly of Tears for Fears). The song was released on 5 June 1995 by East West Records in a variety of vinyl and CD single formats. These included various third-party remixes of "Filling Up with Heaven" and "John Cleese; Is He Funny?", including mixes by Hardfloor.

The single peaked at number 36 in the UK singles chart, spending a total of two weeks in the charts.

== Critical reception ==
In his weekly UK chart commentary, James Masterton wrote, "The latest single from Octopus sounds almost as if it could have come from their early 80s heyday, a loosely structured song, playing on the juxtaposition of Phil Oakey's voice with those of Joanne Catherall and Suzanne Sulley. Very new romantic and so somehow a bit dated, hence possibly this rather lowly chart entry." Jennifer Nine from Melody Maker described 'Filling Up with Heaven' as "shiny", with "the girls' no baby no like silvery icing on Oakey's lines, crowbarred, as always, into awkward scansion. (Until he gives up and just goes hey hey hey, thrillingly.)"

Pan-European magazine Music & Media commented, "Oakey and the girls seem to be on a trip through outer space. Bombarded with more bleeps than in Star Wars, in our control room on planet earth we can see that they're still into melodies." Music Week gave the song three out of five, describing it as a "strong" third single from the album, "if not a break from the successful formula". Amy Raphael from NME was negative, saying, "The League haven't really changed that much over the past 15 years but we have and, where their simplicity was once appealing, it now renders them bland. Which won't stop it from being a hit. Unfortunately." Mark Sutherland from Smash Hits gave it two out of five, writing, "'Tell Me When' and 'One Man in My Heart' were cracking enough tunes, but this is just boring-snoring synth doodling."

== Music video ==
Susan Ann Sulley in the music video for "Filling Up with Heaven"

The accompanying music video for "Filling Up with Heaven" was filmed on a low budget and in a minimalist studio (London's Limehouse Studios), unlike the other music videos for Octopus which were higher end. With rich saturated background colours. It features a series of sweeping steadicam shots of Philip Oakey, with a mainly seated Susan Ann Sulley and Joanne Catherall. It is the only one of the Human League's music videos which Sulley has a long blonde pony tail hairstyle, for the previous two she has short hair, suggesting that she had hair extensions for the video.

For the instrumental sections a continual sweeping loop of Neil Sutton playing keyboards is featured. Post production the video was intentionally stylized by deeply enriching the colours and reducing the pixel resolution, giving a digital smudge effect (as illustrated).

A licensing fee dispute between East West and Virgin Records would prevent the video from being featured on the 2003 Very Best of The Human League DVD. However, in 2016, a remastered version of the video was featured on a DVD included with the deluxe version of the box set A Very British Synthesizer Group.

== Track listings ==
- CD 1 1995, East West (YZ944CD1)
1. "Filling Up with Heaven"
2. "Filling Up with Heaven" (Neil Mclellan vocal mix)
3. "John Cleese; Is He Funny?" (ULA remix)
4. "John Cleese; Is He Funny?" (Self Preservation Society house mix)
- CD 2 1995, East West (YZ944CD2)
1. "Filling Up with Heaven" (Hardfloor vocal remix)
2. "Filling Dub with Heaven" (Hardfloor remix)
3. "Filling Up with Heaven" (Neil Mclellan club mix)
4. "Filling Up with Heaven" (ULA remix)

== Charts ==
Chart (1995)	Peak position
Israel (Israeli Singles Chart)	10
Scotland (OCC)	32
UK Singles (OCC)	36
UK Airplay (Music Week)	39
