= The Human League Video Single (1983) =

The Human League – Video Single

Video by The Human League
- Released: August 1983
- Recorded: 1981–1983
- Genre: Synthpop
- Length: 12 minutes
- Label: Virgin
- Director: Steve Barron
- Producer: Various

The Human League chronology
The Human League – Video Single (1983)	The Human League Greatest Hits (1988)

The Human League Video Single is a music video compilation by the British synthpop group The Human League, released on VHS and Betamax format tape. Marketed as a "video single", it was released in the UK in August 1983.

It was the first "video single" to be released in the UK, designed to tap into the market created by the new and rapidly increasing popularity of domestic videocassette recorders in the UK. Video albums had already been released earlier in the decade by bands such as Blondie, Electric Light Orchestra, and Duran Duran, though these had far longer running times and were more expensive to buy.

The retail price of the Human League's three-track Video Single (£10.99) was roughly half the cost of a full video album such as Blondie's Eat to the Beat, but still hindered sales (by comparison, a 12" vinyl single in 1983 cost around £1.99). Despite this, the format began to gain popularity and by the end of the same year, other artists such as Tears For Fears, Blancmange, Kajagoogoo and Elton John had released videosingle EPs featuring three or four tracks priced at under £10.

The Human League would go on to release a full video album in 1988 for their Greatest Hits compilation.

== Track listing ==
The Video Single was released after the success of the single "Mirror Man" which had reached number two in the UK single charts in December 1982, and "Mirror Man" is the title track, bundled together with the band's two previous biggest selling single videos.

1. "Mirror Man"
2. "Love Action (I Believe in Love)"
3. "Don't You Want Me"
