= Fascination! =

EP by the Human League
- Released: May 1983
- Genres: Synth-pop; dance
- Length: 26:42; 32:37 (with bonus track)
- Labels: Virgin; A&M (US)
- Producers: Martin Rushent; The Human League

The Human League chronology
Love and Dancing (1982)	Fascination! (1983)	Hysteria (1984)

Singles from Fascination
- 1. "Mirror Man" Released: 12 November 1982; 2. "(Keep Feeling) Fascination" Released: 15 April 1983

Fascination! is an EP released by the English synth-pop band the Human League in 1983. The EP was issued as a stop-gap release in between the albums Dare (1981) and Hysteria (1984). Released in the US and Canada, it was made available in Europe as an import.

The original vinyl release of Fascination! contained six tracks, including two versions of their single "(Keep Feeling) Fascination" as well as "Mirror Man", both of which were hits on the UK singles chart and the US Billboard Hot 100.

Also included is "Hard Times", which was originally the B-side of their 1981 hit "Love Action" and also appears on the band's 1982 remix album Love and Dancing.

The featured version of "I Love You Too Much" is an earlier version of the song that would later be released on the band's Hysteria album in 1984.

The album was released as a digital download in 2008 with a bonus track, a dub version of "I Love You Too Much".

A CD version was released as part of the "deluxe edition" release of Dare in 2012, minus Hard Times, but with other extra tracks.

In November 2015 a limited-edition single-CD was released (only in Japan), with the same track list as the Dare "deluxe edition".

== Reception ==
Professional ratings
Review scores
Source	Rating
AllMusic	3/5 stars

A contemporary review in Creem noted the lack of new material on Fascination!, stating: "The more anti-social soothsayers among the reviewers will point out not only that two of these cuts are respective vocal and instrumental versions of the same song, but also that only three cuts are 1983-vintage material per their copyright dates; one '82 and two '81 "leftovers" fill out the disc."

The review noted the lyrics on the album, "Fascination! [...] is all dance dance dance, with maybe a bit of thinking (about dancing) thrown in here and there. I can't find a single phrase worth quoting among all the lyrics, even when Phil Oakey's vokes are at their most drone-authoritative. If I could translate all of Human League's synthesizer squeeps and yowls and pocks into characters and syllables, you'd have the whole verbal freight of Fascination! right there. (Stick with Heaven 17 if you need more coherent word-politics in your muzik.)" The review concluded that "Don't fight the slick funk, as electrolux bands like the Human League will become more and more prominent as the long-cherished myth of the singular-performance rock "concert" breaks down, and fans are increasingly satisfied to get over with prerecorded, undeviatingly swift and sure riffs like these (Human League's the glossiest as they come)."

== Track listing ==
Original US/Canada vinyl release
No.	Title	Writer(s)	Length
1.	"(Keep Feeling) Fascination" (extended version)	Jo Callis, Philip Oakey	4:56
2.	"Mirror Man"	Ian Burden, Callis, Oakey	3:48
3.	"Hard Times"	Callis, Oakey, Philip Adrian Wright	4:54
4.	"I Love You Too Much"	Burden, Callis, Wright	3:18
5.	"You Remind Me of Gold"	Oakey	3:35
6.	"(Keep Feeling) Fascination" (improvisation)	Callis, Oakey	6:12
7.	"I Love You Too Much" (dub version; 2008 digital download bonus track)	Burden, Callis, Wright	5:54

2012 Dare/Fascination! special CD / 2015 Fascination! limited edition single CD (only in Japan)
No.	Title	Length
1.	"Hard Times/Love Action (I Believe in Love)" (instrumental)	11:08
2.	"Mirror Man"	3:51
3.	"You Remind Me of Gold"	3:38
4.	"(Keep Feeling) Fascination" (extended version)	4:59
5.	"I Love You Too Much"	3:20
6.	"Mirror Man" (extended version)	4:23
7.	"You Remind Me of Gold" (instrumental)	3:54
8.	"(Keep Feeling) Fascination" (improvisation)	6:15
9.	"I Love You Too Much" (dub version)	5:53
10.	"Total Panic"	3:29
