= Neil Sutton =

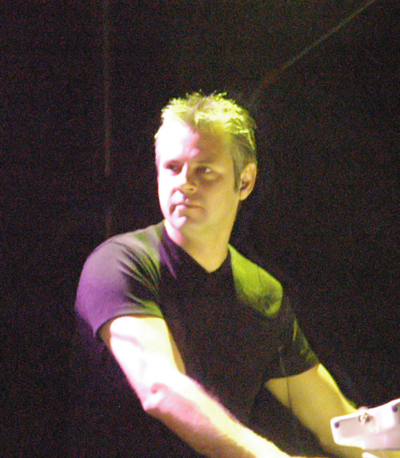

Background information
- Genres: Synthpop
- Instruments: Synthesizer, keyboards, guitar, bass
- Years active: 1986–present
- Label: Various
- Formerly of: The Human League

Neil Sutton is an English musician, known for being a long term touring member for the synthpop group The Human League. He is best known as the on stage and studio keyboard player, but also has written various lyrics and composed instrumental tracks for the band and has numerous Human League album credits.

His association with the Human League started in 1986, where he was employed as a session musician for the Crash Tour of late 1986. Studying as a Geology Undergraduate at Sheffield University, Neil took on a job at a Sheffield music instrument store. Philip Oakey came in one day and asked him to demonstrate some keyboards, then offered Neil the chance to go on tour with the band. Neil accepted and left his degree course. He was subsequently invited to work with the band further and joined the studio and stage team.

In conjunction with band principal Philip Oakey, Sutton has composed a number of the Human League's lyrics and instrumental scores on the Romantic? (1990), Octopus (1995) and Secrets (2001) albums.

== Discography ==
Sutton has writing credits for the following Human League songs:

=== Romantic? (1990) ===
1. "Kiss the Future" (Oakey, Sutton)
2. "A Doorway" (Dennett, Oakey, Sutton)
3. "Mister Moon and Mister Sun" (Oakey, Sutton)
4. "Soundtrack to a Generation" (Oakey, Sutton)
5. "Rebound" (Oakey, Sutton)
6. "The Stars Are Going Out" (Oakey, Sutton)

=== Octopus (1995) ===
1. "One Man in My Heart" (Oakey, Sutton)

=== Secrets (2001) ===
1. "All I Ever Wanted" (Oakey, Sutton)
2. "Nervous" (Oakey, Sutton, Toy) +
3. "Love Me Madly?" (Oakey, Sutton)
4. "Shameless" (Oakey, Sutton)
5. "122.3 BPM" (Oakey, Sutton) +
6. "Never Give Your Heart" (Oakey, Sutton)
7. "Ran" (Oakey, Sutton) +
8. "The Snake" (Oakey, Sutton)
9. "Ringinglow" (Oakey, Sutton, Toy) +
10. "Liar" (Oakey, Sutton)
11. "Lament" (Sutton) +
12. "Release" (Sutton) +
13. "You'll Be Sorry" (Oakey, Sutton)

+ Instrumental
