= Night People (The Human League song) =

Single by the Human League

from the album Credo
- Released: 22 November 2010
- Recorded: 2010
- Studio: Human League (Sheffield, England)
- Genre: Synth-pop
- Length: 5:29
- Label: Wall of Sound
- Songwriters: Rob Barton; Jarrod Gosling; Dean Honer; Philip Oakey
- Producer: I Monster

The Human League singles chronology
| "The Things That Dreams Are Made Of" (2008) | "Night People" (2010) | "Never Let Me Go" (2011) |

Music video
- "Night People" on YouTube

"Night People" is a song by the English synth-pop band The Human League, released on 22 November 2010. It was the first single to be taken from the band's ninth album Credo, which was released in March 2011.

The single features remixes from Cerrone, Mylo, Emperor Machine and Villa. The single reached No. 21 on the UK Physical Singles Sales Chart and No.25 on the UK Independent Singles Chart.

Dave Simpson of The Guardian said of the song, "Stark synthesisers, an instantly memorable hookline and lyrics about nightclubbing make for their best track in more than 20 years."

Simon Price of The Independent described "Night People" as "an exuberantly anthemic Human League classic".

Philip Oakey stated in a February 2011 interview that "Night People" "was not designed to go on the radio; it was designed to go into clubs, to have remixes but suddenly it's a single and it got played on Radio 2."
