= Credo (The Human League album) =

2011 studio album by the Human League

Studio album by the Human League
- Released: 21 March 2011
- Recorded: 2010
- Studios: Human League (Sheffield, England)
- Genre: Synth-pop
- Length: 43:50
- Label: Wall of Sound
- Producer: I Monster

The Human League chronology
Secrets (2001)	Credo (2011)	Dare / Fascination! (2012)

Singles from Credo
- 1. "Night People" Released: 22 November 2010; 2. "Never Let Me Go" Released: 1 March 2011; 3. "Egomaniac" Released: 4 March 2011; 4. "Sky" Released: 25 July 2011

Credo is the ninth studio album by English synth-pop band the Human League, released on 21 March 2011 by Wall of Sound. It was their first studio album since Secrets (2001). It was produced by fellow Sheffield act I Monster.

The first single from the album, "Night People" was released on 22 November 2010. Follow-up single "Never Let Me Go" was released on 1 March 2011. "Egomaniac" served as the second single in Germany, Austria and Switzerland because the Human League secured a slot on a major German TV show for a performance of "Egomaniac". The TV programme aired on 4 March and the single was released the same day. In those three territories the album itself was released on 11 March to narrow the gap between the TV airing and the album being available. In the rest of Europe, the album was released on 21 March to narrow the gap between the release in Germany, Austria and Switzerland and the rest of the continent. The third single, "Sky" was released on 25 July 2011.

Credo was released digitally in the United States on 16 August 2011, followed by a physical release on 23 August.

In 2012, the album was awarded a silver certification from the Independent Music Companies Association (IMPALA), denoting sales in excess of 20,000 copies across Europe.

== Production ==
Following the commercial underperformance of their previous album, Secrets, the band decided to concentrate on their live appearances and forego a contract with a major label. After seven years of working live venues, Philip Oakey and Rob Barton decided the band needed new material. These new tracks caught the attention of Mark Jones, founder of Wall of Sound.

Teaming up with Sheffield-based electronic act I Monster, the band decided to cater the album mainly toward the dance scene.

The band decided to retain an earlier feel to some of the tracks, including "Privilege" (which they wanted to "sit next to Being Boiled" and "fixed in 1978"), but welcomed I Monster's heavy resequencing on others, including "Sky". Oakey notes I Monster's contribution to the album stating in an interview with John Doran of The Quietus, "The first thing he gave us back, 'Sky' we just went, 'Wow, how has he turned that into this?' They've got a really good collection of synths."

== Critical reception ==
Professional ratings
Aggregate scores
Source	Rating
Metacritic	58/100
Review scores
Source	Rating
AllMusic	3/5 stars
The Boston Phoenix	3/4 stars
Consequence of Sound	3/5 stars
The Guardian	3/5 stars
Mixmag	3/5 stars
Mojo	2/5 stars
musicOMH	4/5 stars
NME	7/10
Q	3/5 stars
Uncut	6/10

The album has received mixed reviews scoring 58 at Metacritic. Mojo magazine said "Will their return to recording prove their relevance, three decades after 1981's epochal, synapse-sparkling Dare!? The hi-gloss but uneven Credo only partially convinces." Music Week compared Credo to "a latter period Pet Shop Boys album."

Favourable reviews included Gay Times, which awarded Credo five out of five and called it an "incredible pop offering". Mixmag praised the album for being "crisp, dynamic and upbeat, with contemporary electronic pop sheen". Caroline Sullivan from The Guardian remarked that "Credo sounds like nobody but the Human League: electronics gurgle and whirr, and some fairly memorable melodies surge and flow. The production is sleeker than before." musicOMH declared, "Credo, is a lot of fun, marred only by occasionally bad lyrics. It feels like a defiance of time." and that "it still sounds completely fresh and absolutely The Human League." They also stated that the album is "beguiling".

The three singles released from the album failed to chart, however "Never Let Me Go" received substantial airplay on BBC Radio 2. The album itself charted at No. 44 on the UK Albums Chart. A double vinyl edition was released on 25 July 2011.

== Track listing ==
All tracks are written by Robert Barton and Philip Oakey, except where noted.

1. "Never Let Me Go" 4:54
2. "Night People" (Barton, Honer, Gosling, Oakey) 5:30
3. "Sky" 4:54
4. "Into the Night" 3:43
5. "Egomaniac" 3:58
6. "Single Minded" 3:50
7. "Electric Shock" (Barton, Honer, Gosling, Oakey) 4:49
8. "Get Together" 3:48
9. "Privilege" 3:36
10. "Breaking the Chains" 4:00
11. "When the Stars Start to Shine" 3:48

== Charts ==
Chart performance for Credo
Chart (2011)	Peak position
Belgian Albums (Ultratop Flanders)	85
Belgian Heatseekers Albums (Ultratop Wallonia)	3
German Albums (Offizielle Top 100)	57
Scottish Albums (Official Charts)	62
UK Albums (Official Charts)	44
UK Independent Albums (Official Charts)	9
