= YMO Versus The Human League =

EP / Remix by Yellow Magic Orchestra / The Human League
- Released: April 1993
- Recorded: Fon Studios, Sheffield
- Genres: Synthpop, electropop
- Length: 21:30
- Languages: English & Japanese
- Label: Alfa
- Producers: Yoshihiro Akiya, Ray Hearn, David Beevers

YMO Versus The Human League is an EP released in Japan and Asia in April 1993. It was released by Alfa Records and is a collaboration between Japanese electropop/synthpop band Yellow Magic Orchestra and British new wave/synthpop band The Human League. It was the first release by the Human League after the band's abrupt dismissal from its 14-year-long recording contract with Virgin Records 10 months previously.

It features four tracks (taken from Yellow Magic Orchestra, Solid State Survivor and Naughty Boys). "Behind the Mask" was remixed by Mark Gamble (based on Michael Jackson's version) instead of the Human League. "Kimi Ni Mune Kyun" (Trans: "My Heart Beats, for You (A Holiday Affair)") has new English lyrics written by Philip Oakey and sung by Susan Ann Sulley and Joanne Catherall. The song was later included as a B-side to The Human League's "Tell Me When" in 1994.

== Track listing ==
All songs arranged by Haruomi Hosono, Ryuichi Sakamoto, Yukihiro Takahashi, Philip Oakey, Joanne Catherall, Susan Ann Sulley and Mark Gamble.

No.	Title	Lyrics	Music	Length
1.	"Behind the Mask"	Chris Mosdell, Michael Jackson	Ryuichi Sakamoto, Yukihiro Takahashi	3:48
2.	"Kimi ni, Mune Kyun. (Uwaki na Vakansu) (君に、胸キュン。 （浮気なヴァカンス）)"	Takashi Matsumoto, Philip Oakey	Haruomi Hosono, Sakamoto, Takahashi	3:54
3.	"Kimi ni, Mune Kyun. (Uwaki na Vakansu) (君に、胸キュン。 （浮気なヴァカンス）)" (Extended)	Matsumoto, Oakey	Hosono, Sakamoto, Takahashi	5:54
4.	"Computer Game "Theme from The Circus” Firecracker; Tong Poo (東風, Ton Pū)"		Hosono, Sakamoto, Takahashi; Martin Denny; Sakamoto	7:53
