= Romantic? =

Studio album by the Human League
- Released: 17 September 1990
- Studios: Genetic Studios, Streatley, Berkshire
- Length: 43:37
- Labels: Virgin (UK); A&M (US)
- Producers: Tim Baldwinn; Mark Brydon; Robert Gordon; Bob Kraushaar; Martin Rushent

The Human League chronology
Crash (1986)	Romantic? (1990)	Octopus (1995)

Singles from Romantic?
- 1. "Heart Like a Wheel" Released: 6 August 1990; 2. "Soundtrack to a Generation" Released: 12 November 1990

Professional ratings
Review scores
Source	Rating
AllMusic	2/5 stars
Chicago Tribune	2/4 stars
Entertainment Weekly	B+
NME	3/10
Ottawa Citizen	1/5 stars
Q	2/5 stars
Record Mirror	1.5/5
Rolling Stone	2.5/5 stars
The Rolling Stone Album Guide	1.5/5 stars
Smash Hits	6/10

Romantic? is the sixth studio album by the English synth-pop band the Human League. It was issued by Virgin Records in 1990 and was the band's first album of new material in four years. Romantic? had several producers, most notably Martin Rushent, who worked with the Human League on their biggest commercial success (1981's Dare) and had walked out of the recording sessions for its 1984 follow-up (Hysteria). Also producing several tracks is Mark Brydon, who would be one half of musical duo Moloko several years later.

At the time of the album's release, the Human League had reached the nadir of a decline in popularity following the success of Dare nine years prior; this fall from grace was reflected in the song "The Stars Are Going Out", in which the band reflects upon their loss of fame and its impact on them; the song one writer called a "pointless and bland filler," was ditched as a potential third single.

The album signalled a critical and commercial low point for the band, which led to their long-standing contract with Virgin Records being terminated. The only significant success came from the album's first single "Heart Like a Wheel", which peaked at No. 29 on the UK Singles Chart and No. 32 on the U.S. Billboard Hot 100. The second single "Soundtrack to a Generation" charted at No. 77 in the UK. The album itself peaked at No. 24 on the UK Albums Chart, and as a result the band moved to East West Records to release their next album, 1995's Octopus.

The Human League's live performance of "The Stars Are Going Out" on Later... with Jools Holland in 1995 was included on their 2003 The Very Best of the Human League DVD.

== Track listing ==
All tracks are written by Philip Oakey and Neil Sutton, except where noted.

Side one
No.	Title	Writer(s)	Length
1.	"Kiss the Future"		4:13
2.	"A Doorway?"	Russell Dennett; Philip Oakey; Neil Sutton	4:21
3.	"Heart Like a Wheel"	Jo Callis; Eugene Reynolds	4:30
4.	"Men Are Dreamers"	Dennett; Oakey	3:54
5.	"Mister Moon and Mister Sun"		4:42

Side two
No.	Title	Writer(s)	Length
6.	"Soundtrack to a Generation"		4:35
7.	"Rebound"		3:54
8.	"The Stars Are Going Out"		4:05
9.	"Let's Get Together Again"	Gerry Shephard; John Rossall	5:01
10.	"Get It Right This Time"	Callis; Jesse Rae	4:12
Total length:			43:37

== Charts ==
Chart (1990)	Peak position
Australian Albums (ARIA Charts)	115
UK Albums Chart	24
