= All I Ever Wanted (The Human League song) =

2001 single by the Human League

Single by the Human League

from the album Secrets
- Released: 23 July 2001
- Recorded: 2000
- Genre: Synth-pop; electronica; acid house
- Label: Papillon
- Songwriter(s): Philip Oakey; Neil Sutton
- Producer(s): Q; Kerry Hopwood; Dave Clayton

The Human League singles chronology
"Stay with Me Tonight" (1996)	"All I Ever Wanted" (2001)	"Love Me Madly?" (2003)

Audio sample
- file; help

Music video
- "All I Ever Wanted" on YouTube

"All I Ever Wanted" is a song by the English synth-pop band the Human League. It is taken from the Secrets album of 2001 and was released as its first single. It is currently their most recent single released on a major label. It follows the standard Human League style of baritone lead vocals of Philip Oakey with choruses and incidentals jointly shared between female co-vocalists Joanne Catherall and Susan Ann Sulley (credited for the first time under her married name, Gayle, causing some erroneous comment that 'Susan Sulley' had been replaced). It was released in July 2001 and stalled at number 47 in the UK Singles Chart.

== Background ==
The Human League had recently signed to Papillon Records, a subsidiary of the Chrysalis Group. Papillon were set up to capitalize on so called 'heritage acts' (bands with a large and established fan base) and the Human League were to become their headline band. However the label was in financial difficulties as previous releases had failed to realize Papillon Records' investments and Chrysalis were unwilling to further invest. The band recorded the studio album Secrets, their first since Octopus in 1995. "All I Ever Wanted" was to be the first single from the album and with a professional promotional music video filmed the single was expected to enter high up the UK charts heralding another return to form for the Human League similar to Octopus six years previously. Although keenly anticipated, Papillon dithered over the release date, with even Oakey stating he didn't know when the single would be eventually released.

The uncertain release date for "All I Ever Wanted" prompted worries from some in the industry that Papillon Records may have been having problems and there was also little in the way of advance promotion for the single for the public, save a token advertisement in UK's tabloid Red Tops.

To compound the problem in the UK, BBC Radio 1 and 2 did not playlist the single. Alex Jones-Donnely, head of music programming for BBC Radio 1 claimed that the audience would not be able to 'connect' with the Human League's new single adding that it was too 'retro'. It was also claimed that with Oakey in his late 40s and the girls (Susan Sulley and Joanne Catherall) both 39, the group didn't meet Radio 1's demographic target audience of teenagers and 20-somethings. Philip Oakey responded that "it was their station, they can play what they want".

The single was finally released on 23 July 2001, but most stores in the UK didn't get the single on the first day of release and fans reported problems obtaining it. Despite this, midweek chart figures had the single down as a hit within the top 30 but as limited stocks sold out - the single dropped. The distribution chaos sealed the single's fate and the single scraped into the UK charts at number 47, it remained at the lower end of the charts for a further two weeks before disappearing. Philip Oakey defended Papillon Records against criticisms, responding that the label had spent much time, effort and money on the recording of Secrets, but privately the band were devastated.

Oakey spoke of his regret on the single, saying: "We're kicking ourselves for not working harder on that first single. We ended up going with a trendy promo agency whose only strategy was to get us on Radio 1. We got a really nice midweek chart position but didn't have the impact that we would have done if we'd followed up by doing Lorraine Kelly or This Morning after that, so it didn't come off."

== Music video ==
Susan Ann Sulley in music video for "All I Ever Wanted"

The music video was filmed on a moderate budget on a small studio set, made to resemble a science fiction film. In keeping with the promotional videos from the previous album, there is no storyline. Only Oakey, Sulley and Catherall appear, all dressed in black against a futuristic white set. As the band's age was a contentious issue, the standard filmmakers' technique of making the band appear younger by the use of bright lighting and high exposure is applied. This worked well for the darker features of Oakey and Catherall, but the lighter skin and blonde hair of Sulley made her appear over-exposed throughout the video. It appears on the Very Best of the Human League DVD.

== Reception ==
The Times wrote: "Yep, They're back. And, yes, very little has changed, which is good news because there wasn't much wrong with the Human League's pop prototype in the first place. Metallic beats, burping electronica, simple melodies and the playful interplay between Phil Oakey's sonorous baritone and Joanne and Susanne's girly voices are present and correct."

== Track listings ==
12" vinyl
A1. "All I Ever Wanted" (Oliver Lieb's Main Mix) – 7:41
A2. "All I Ever Wanted" (Oliver Lieb's Alternative Mix) – 7:10
B1. "All I Ever Wanted" (The Vanity Case Mix) – 6:02
B2. "All I Ever Wanted" (The Vanity Case Instrumental Mix) – 5:59

CD 1

1. "All I Ever Wanted" (Dave Bascombe Album Mix) – 3:32
2. "Tranquility" – 3:28
3. "All I Ever Wanted" (Vanity Case Mix) – 6:02

CD 2

1. "All I Ever Wanted" (Original Mix) – 3:55
2. "All I Ever Wanted" (Oliver Lieb Main Mix) – 7:41
3. "All I Ever Wanted" (Video) – 3:33

== Versions ==
Two main versions of the song exist:

- The original version, which features on CD 2 and their 2003 greatest hits compilation.
- The album version, remixed by Dave Bascombe, which is faster and features much more instrumentation than the sparse original version.
