= Louise (The Human League song) =

Single by the Human League

from the album Hysteria
- B-side: "The Sign"
- Released: 5 November 1984
- Recorded: March 1984-July 1984
- Studio: AIR (London)
- Genre: Synth-pop
- Length: 4:54
- Label: Virgin
- Songwriters: Philip Oakey; Jo Callis; Philip Adrian Wright
- Producers: Chris Thomas; Hugh Padgham

The Human League singles chronology
"Life on Your Own" (1984)	"Louise" (1984)	"Human" (1986)

Music video
- "Louise" on YouTube

"Louise" is a song by the English synth-pop band the Human League. It was released as a single in the UK on 5 November 1984 by Virgin Records and peaked at No. 13 in the UK singles chart. It was written jointly by lead vocalist Philip Oakey with fellow band members Jo Callis and Philip Adrian Wright. The song features a lead vocal by Oakey and female vocals by Susan Ann Sulley and Joanne Catherall, analogue synthesizers by Philip Oakey, Jo Callis, Philip Adrian Wright and Ian Burden. The record producers were Chris Thomas and Hugh Padgham. Although enjoying modest success when released as a single, it appeared on Melody Maker's list of 50 top singles of 1984.

== Background ==
"Louise" was the third single released from the band's fourth studio album Hysteria, the Human League's follow up album to the international multi-platinum Dare (1981). Like the rest of Hysteria, it was recorded during the hugely expensive and turbulent sessions by the band at AIR Studios during 1983–1984. Dare producer Martin Rushent had quit earlier, after repeatedly falling out with Oakey and production had been handed to Chris Thomas and Hugh Padgham, with final finishing taking place at Townhouse Studios.

"Louise" is essentially a male song with female backing; and was expected to be Hysteria's answer to "Don't You Want Me". The near spoken vocal is accompanied by electric piano-style chords (another similarity to "Don't You Want Me"), all underpinned by a catchy lolloping bassline, and adorned by a prominent brass solo (also played on a synthesiser).

Despite the fact that many reviews of Hysteria identified "Louise" as a stand out track with Melody Maker's Colin Irwin speculating that it could be a potential number one single for the Human League, the song was not Virgin Records' first choice as a single release from the album. That went to "The Lebanon".

The lyrical story telling of "Louise" superficially seems to be a story about a chance encounter between a man and a woman on a bus who seem to be on the verge of a lover's reconciliation. But like much of Oakey's song writing, what seems 'sugary sweet' on the surface actually has a much darker subtext. Oakey points out that the story is actually about the original protagonists from "Don't You Want Me" meeting up 4 years later. In "Louise" the man sees his lost love again and still cannot deal with reality. The anger that drove the earlier song has dissipated, and is replaced with a hopeful fantasy that his ex-lover is drawn to him all over again. So "Louise" is really about self-deception, delusion and eternal sadness. Oakey says about "Louise" in interview:

It's about men thinking they can manipulate women when they can't, even conning themselves that they have when they haven't.

However, like the less savoury premise of "Don't You Want Me", the darker side of the "Louise" story went over the heads of the record buying public, who misinterpreted the lyrics as "sweet and upbeat".

Because the second single from Hysteria, "Life on Your Own", did not do as well in the charts as expected, Virgin Records held back on the follow-up release of "Louise". However, the unexpected runaway success of the independent Giorgio Moroder and Philip Oakey film soundtrack single "Together in Electric Dreams" in late summer 1984 prompted them to reconsider and release "Louise" as a single in October 1984. Despite modest support from Virgin and the band, it went to number 13 in the UK singles chart spending a total of 10 weeks in the charts.

The single cover artwork by designer Ken Ansell is a reverse reproduction of the artwork to "Don't You Want Me". The "Louise" cover has an inset montage of a menacing Ian Burden glowering at an 'innocent' Joanne Catherall taking over the roles of Oakey and Sulley from the 1981 artwork.

The song was revived and covered in 2006 by Robbie Williams on his seventh studio album Rudebox, produced by William Orbit.

It was again revived by Tony Christie in a stripped-down version featuring piano and trumpet on his 2008 album of songs by Sheffield based songwriters, Made in Sheffield.

== Promotional video ==
The music video for Louise was directed by the Irish-British filmmaker Steve Barron who had directed most of the band's videos up to that point, and was to be his last for the band.

His story board plays on the literary perceptions of the song. It was filmed in black and white to add gravitas, something that was not popular with music television stations at the time, who called it "drab". The video's story mirrors the song's origins in that all the characters from the 1981 video for "Don't You Want Me" are present. Susan Ann Sulley wears the same trench coat she wore in the DYWM video (in a flashback to the DYWM video [which was in colour]) and has a similar hairstyle; she is the 'Louise' character, and it is revealed that she was dating the 'film editor' played by Wright (in this video's storyline, she dates Burden). Oakey, who plays a 'bookwriter' as opposed to a 'film director' in the video for DYWM, spends the whole video navigating a narrowboat along a London canal while narrating the scene as the action takes place on the road paralleling the canal. There is also limited stunt work with a London AEC Routemaster bus skidded to a halt on a bridge (where Burden and Sulley get off); and Joanne Catherall herself dives into the canal water in one scene. The video also alludes to Philip Oakey and Joanne Catherall's real lifelong term relationship, with the couple sharing a bath (Oakley fully dressed, Catherall in a swimsuit) and other intimate moments on camera. The video was called "too arty" at the time, and the story that it was trying to tell was never fully understood by the public.

== Track listing ==
7" vinyl (Virgin VS723)

1. "Louise" – 4:54
2. "The Sign" (extended re-mix) (version) – 4:50

12" vinyl (Virgin VS723-12)

1. "Louise" – 4:54
2. "The Sign" (extended re-mix) – 5:12
