= Octopus (The Human League album) =

Studio album by The Human League
- Released: 23 January 1995
- Recorded: 1994–1995
- Length: 45:12
- Label: East West
- Producer: Ian Stanley

The Human League chronology
Romantic? (1990)	Octopus (1995)	Greatest Hits (1996)

Singles from Octopus
- 1. "Tell Me When" Released: 26 December 1994; 2. "One Man in My Heart" Released: 6 March 1995; 3. "Filling Up with Heaven" Released: 5 June 1995

Professional ratings
Review scores
Source	Rating
AllMusic	3/5 stars
Chicago Tribune	2/4 stars
Entertainment Weekly	B−
The Guardian	3/4 stars
NME	7/10
Q	2/5 stars
Rolling Stone	2/5 stars
The Rolling Stone Album Guide	1/5 stars
Select	2/5
Smash Hits	2/5

Octopus is the seventh full-length studio album recorded by the English synth-pop band The Human League. It was produced by the former Tears for Fears keyboard player Ian Stanley and released by EastWest Records in 1995. The album's title referenced the fact that it was their eighth album in total including their Greatest Hits album from 1988. It was the first new album from The Human League in five years after the termination of their long-term contract with Virgin Records. Octopus was the first Human League album that presented the band as a trio consisting of the singers Philip Oakey, Joanne Catherall and Susan Ann Sulley. The former Human League member Jo Callis and keyboard player Neil Sutton also contributed to the writing of the album.

The album's sound is notable for almost exclusively featuring analogue synthesizers, a marked change from the band's primarily "digital" sound in the mid-to-late 1980s.

== Background ==
The album saw a return to the public eye for the band, who had been out of the top ten since their 1986 album Crash. Band members Catherall and Sulley admitted that Octopus is "probably our last shot at the big time." Oakey described the album as the band returning to its synthesizer roots, saying: "We went in some silly directions after Dare, trying to bring in acoustic instruments and trying to make white soul music. Now we've gone back to how we started, singing over recorded sequences on synthesizers."

== Release ==
Contrasting the failure of previous album Romantic?, Octopus was a commercial success. The first single, "Tell Me When", received support from MTV in the UK and the U.S. and the song became the band's first top-ten hit in nine years, peaking at number six in the UK Singles Chart. The single also climbed to number thirty-one in the U.S. Billboard Hot 100. The Octopus album also peaked at number six in the UK, becoming the Human League's sixth top-ten album. It was later certified gold by the British Phonographic Industry for sales of over 100,000 copies.

The album was released in the US on Elektra Records on 25 April 1995.

The album's second single "One Man in My Heart", a ballad sung by Sulley, also reached the UK top-twenty and the third single from the album, "Filling Up with Heaven", was also a UK Top 40 hit.

Although the album sold well and renewed interest in the band, EastWest Records went through a complete change in management and decided to cancel the band's contract as well as those of other established artists. It was another six years before the band released a new album on new label Papillon Records.

== Track listing ==
No.	Title	Writer(s)	Length
1.	"Tell Me When"	Paul Beckett, Philip Oakey	4:51
2.	"These Are the Days"	Oakey, Ian Stanley	5:46
3.	"One Man in My Heart"	Oakey, Neil Sutton	4:05
4.	"Words"	Russell Dennett, Oakey	5:55
5.	"Filling up with Heaven"	Oakey, Stanley	4:22
6.	"Housefull of Nothing"	Beckett, Oakey, Stanley	4:31
7.	"John Cleese: Is He Funny?"	Oakey	3:59
8.	"Never Again"	Jo Callis, Oakey	4:43
9.	"Cruel Young Lover"	Beckett, Dennett, Oakey	6:58
Total length:			45:12

CD 2: The Demos / Singles / Edits
No.	Title	Writer(s)	Length
1.	"Tell Me When (Demo)" (Previously unreleased)	Beckett, Oakey	6:23
2.	"These Are the Days (Demo)" (Previously unreleased)	Oakey, Stanley	5:54
3.	"One Man in My Heart (Demo)" (Previously unreleased)	Oakey, Sutton	4:24
4.	"Words (Demo)" (Previously unreleased)	Dennett, Oakey	4:47
5.	"Filling up with Heaven (Demo)" (Previously unreleased)	Oakey, Stanley	3:58
6.	"Housefull of Nothing (Demo)" (Previously unreleased)	Beckett, Oakey, Stanley	4:38
7.	"John Cleese: Is He Funny? (Demo)" (Previously unreleased)	Oakey	3:51
8.	"Never Again (Demo)" (Previously unreleased)	Callis, Oakey	5:09
9.	"Cruel Young Lover (Demo)" (Previously unreleased)	Beckett, Dennett, Oakey	5:11
10.	"Tell Me When (7" Edit)"	Beckett, Oakey	4:45
11.	"The Bus to Crookes" (B-side to "Tell Me When")	Dennett, Oakey	4:50
12.	"Stay With Me Tonight (Single Version)" (From Greatest Hits (1995 version))	Oakey, Stanley	4:01
13.	"Behind The Mask" (From YMO Versus The Human League)	Michael Jackson, Chris Mosdell, Ryuichi Sakamoto	3:49
14.	"Kimi Ni, Mune Kyun" (From YMO Versus The Human League)	Takashi Mastumoto, Oakey, Yellow Magic Orchestra	3:54
Total length:			65:34

LP 2: The Remixes Side One
No.	Title	Writer(s)	Length
1.	"Tell Me When (Utah Saints Mix 1)"	Beckett, Oakey	5:09
2.	"One Man in My Heart (T.O.E.C. Nasty Sue Mix)"	Oakey, Sutton	5:32
3.	"Filling up with Heaven (Hardfloor Vocal Remix)"	Oakey, Stanley	7:31
4.	"Stay With Me Tonight (The Biff & Memphis Remix)"	Oakey, Stanley	6:43
Total length:			24:55

Side Two
No.	Title	Writer(s)	Length
5.	"One Man in My Heart (T.O.E.C. Radio Edit)"	Oakey, Sutton	3:45
6.	"These Are the Days (Sonic Radiation)"	Oakey, Stanley	7:02
7.	"Filling up with Heaven (ULA Remix)"	Oakey, Stanley	5:23
8.	"Tell Me When (The Real Purple Mix)" (Previously unreleased)	Beckett, Oakey	7:34
Total length:			48:39

== Chart performance ==
Chart (1995)	Peak position
German Albums Chart	76
UK Albums Chart	6
