= Secrets (The Human League album) =

Studio album by The Human League
- Released: 6 August 2001
- Recorded: 2000–2001
- Genre: Pop, electronic
- Length: 51:46
- Label: Papillon Records; BTFLYCD0019
- Producer: Toy (Dave Clayton and Kerry Hopwood)

The Human League chronology
Octopus (1995)	Secrets (2001)	Credo (2011)

Singles from Secrets
- 1. "All I Ever Wanted" Released: 23 July 2001; 2. "Love Me Madly?" Released: 2003

Professional ratings
Review scores
Source	Rating
AllMusic	3/5 stars
Alternative Press	7/10
Dotmusic	8/10
The Gazette	3.5/5 stars
The Guardian	4/5 stars
The Independent	4/5 stars
Muzik	4/5
Q	4/5 stars
The Times	4/5 stars
Uncut	4/5 stars

Secrets is the eighth studio album by British synth-pop band The Human League. It was issued in 2001 by Papillon Records and was the Human League's first studio album in six years. The album was well received by critics but performed poorly commercially.

== Background ==
As on the previous album Octopus, the band was presented as a trio of singers – Philip Oakey, Joanne Catherall and Susan Ann Sulley (credited by her married name, Susan Ann Gayle, which she would drop professionally in October 2007), although band member Neil Sutton contributed songwriting and keyboards.

Following the band's short stint with East West Records for their top-ten 1995 album Octopus, they signed to Papillon Records in May 2000 and began recording tracks for the album with production team TOY, featuring former ABC members Dave Clayton, Q, and Kerry Hopwood, at the act's studio in Sheffield.

In a Guardian interview to promote the record, Oakey spoke of the personal difficulties that he and Sulley experienced during the nineties. Both had medicated with Prozac to cope. He said that Secrets has "the overall feeling of mental illness about it".

The album contains sixteen tracks, seven of which are short, transitional instrumentals.

"I was probably more happy with that album than with any other," Oakey said in 2003.

== Release ==
The album was released in the UK on August 06, 2001. It opened on the UK Albums Chart at number 44, selling only 4,143 copies in its first week. It is their joint-lowest charting UK album, along with Credo released a decade later in 2011. Commercial success was hampered due to the bankruptcy of Papillon (a division of Chrysalis Records) shortly after its release. On the poor charting, Oakey said in 2008: "That took us aback for a bit. We realized that we have to find different ways to get our music to people. And to be honest, listeners have grown older. They don't go out of their way to find music like they did when they were teens." As of March 2011, the album had total sales of 11,854 copies. Secrets was released in the United States on Ark21 Records November 2001. The first single "All I Ever Wanted" returned the Human League to the UK Singles Chart after a five-year absence peaking at number forty-seven. In 2003, after the collapse of Papillon Records, a follow-up single from Secrets, "Love Me Madly?," was released privately by Michiel Van Bokhorst's Nukove Records, a company set up especially to release Human League records. The album was reissued as a deluxe 2CD version in April 2018 by Edsel Records. As part of Record Store Day 2018, the album was issued for the first time as a three-sided double LP white vinyl.

== Critical reception ==
The album was generally well received by critics in the UK. The Times gave a positive review. David Stubbs wrote: "Secrets is a pleasing mixture of old style Human League and state-of-the-art techno pop. Songs such as All I Ever Wanted and Liar are splendidly melodramatic, with Phil Oakey's voice the perfect antidote to the sub-Mariah [Carey] vocal aerobics peddled by today's pop groups." The Guardian's Betty Clarke was also favourable. She wrote: "Philip Oakey still writes catchy yet ambiguous pop songs, and his voice manages to be both severe and tender... This isn't just a return to form: it stands alone as completely brilliant." Steven Clark of The List was very favourable, and called it a "return to the trademark Human League sound... to say it's their best album since Dare is faint praise." He concluded, saying: "[S]o the fact that in 2001 they are actually valid and making excellent pop music puts the Human League back to the top of the league."

Some critics were more mixed and felt the music lacked the hooks of their early hits. Wayne Hoffman of Billboard wrote: "Seven instrumental interludes offer some respite from uninspired lyrics. But there's little new ground broken here. And one key ingredient of Human League's recipe is lacking: irresistible hooks that drove such hits as "(Keep Feeling) Fascination" and "Human." Likewise, Andy Gill of The Independent felt the band had made little progress from their "Dare heyday". While he named some tracks on the album to be admired, he felt that "the hooks here aren't anywhere near as adhesive as 'Love Action' and 'Don't You Want Me'." The BBC's Tim Masters however, disagreed with this stance, saying: "After some disappointing albums in the late 80s and early 90s, the Human League have achieved that rarest of feats: a record with more hooks than a fisherman's kit bag. The opening track 'All I Ever Wanted' is like the last two decades never happened."

== Track listing ==
No.	Title	Writer(s)	Length
1.	"All I Ever Wanted"	Philip Oakey, Neil Sutton	3:32
2.	"Nervous" (transitional track)	Philip Oakey, Neil Sutton, Toy	2:05
3.	"Love Me Madly?"	Philip Oakey, Neil Sutton	4:08
4.	"Shameless"	Philip Oakey, Neil Sutton	3:56
5.	"122.3 BPM" (transitional track)	Philip Oakey, Neil Sutton, Toy	1:39
6.	"Never Give Your Heart"	Philip Oakey, Neil Sutton	3:48
7.	"Ran" (transitional track)	Philip Oakey, Neil Sutton	0:49
8.	"The Snake"	Philip Oakey, Neil Sutton	4:25
9.	"Ringinglow" (transitional track)	Philip Oakey, Neil Sutton, Toy	3:23
10.	"Liar"	Philip Oakey, Neil Sutton	3:21
11.	"Lament" (transitional track)	Neil Sutton	1:12
12.	"Reflections (Demons of the Mind)"	Steve Fellowes, Philip Oakey	6:38
13.	"Brute" (transitional track)	Philip Oakey	2:27
14.	"Sin City"	Philip Oakey	4:24
15.	"Release" (transitional track)	Neil Sutton	1:58
16.	"You'Il Be Sorry"	Philip Oakey, Neil Sutton	4:01
Total length:			51:46

== Chart performance ==
Chart (2001)	Peak position
German Albums Chart	64
UK Albums Chart	44
