= Heart Like a Wheel (The Human League song) =

Single by The Human League

from the album Romantic?
- B-side: "Rebound"
- Released: 6 August 1990
- Recorded: 1990
- Studio: Genetic Sound (Streatley, Berkshire)
- Length: 4:30
- Label: Virgin
- Songwriters: Jo Callis; Eugene Reynolds
- Producer: Martin Rushent

The Human League singles chronology
"Love Is All That Matters" (1986)	"Heart Like a Wheel" (1990)	"Soundtrack to a Generation" (1990)

Audio sample
- file; help

Music video
- "Heart Like a Wheel" on YouTube

"Heart Like a Wheel" is a song by English synth-pop band The Human League. It was the first single to be taken from their sixth studio album, Romantic? (1990), and was written by former band member Jo Callis with Eugene Reynolds (of the Rezillos) and features vocals by Philip Oakey, Joanne Catherall and Susan Ann Sulley; with synthesizer by Neil Sutton. Recorded at Genetic Sound during 1990, it was produced by Martin Rushent. Released in the UK in August 1990 by Virgin Records, "Heart Like a Wheel" reached number 29 in the UK, numbers 30 and 32 on the US Cash Box Top 100 and Billboard Hot 100 charts, and number 64 in Australia. The accompanying music video was directed by British director Andy Morahan.

== Critical reception ==
Upon its release, Gary Crossing of Record Mirror noted that The Human League are "back on form with this radio friendly four minutes". He added, "Based around a sing-along barbed chorus, this thunders along until it reaches the hole in the middle, whisking you back to the days of 'Mirror Man'."

== Track listing ==
- CD 1 1990, Virgin (VSCDT 1262)
1. "Heart Like a Wheel" – 4:30
2. "Heart Like a Wheel" (Extended Mix) – 6:55
3. "Rebound" – 3:58
4. "Heart Like a Wheel" (Remix) – 4:37
- CD 2 1990, Virgin (VSCDX 1262)
1. "Heart Like a Wheel" – 4:30
2. "Heart Like a Wheel" (Extended Mix) – 6:55
3. "Rebound" – 3:58
4. "A Doorway" (Dub Mix) – 4:29

== Charts ==
Chart (1990)	Peak position
Australia (ARIA)	64
Europe (Eurochart Hot 100)	78
UK Singles (Official Charts)	29
US Billboard Hot 100	32
US Alternative Airplay (Billboard)	17
US Cash Box Top 100	30
West Germany (Official German Charts)	36
