= Hysteria (The Human League album) =

Studio album by the Human League
- Released: 7 May 1984
- Studios: AIR (London); Townhouse (London)
- Genre: Synth-pop
- Length: 39:59
- Label: Virgin
- Producers: Hugh Padgham; Chris Thomas; The Human League

The Human League chronology
Fascination! (1983)	Hysteria (1984)	Crash (1986)

Singles from Hysteria
- 1. "The Lebanon" Released: 24 April 1984; 2. "Life on Your Own" Released: 18 June 1984; 3. "Louise" Released: 5 November 1984

Professional ratings
Review scores
Source	Rating
AllMusic	2.5/5 stars
Calgary Herald	E
Number One	4/5
The Philadelphia Inquirer	3/4 stars
Record Mirror	5/5 stars
Rolling Stone	2/5 stars
The Rolling Stone Album Guide	1.5/5 stars
Smash Hits	5/10
The Village Voice	C
Windsor Star	C+

Hysteria is the fourth studio album by the English synth-pop band the Human League, released on 7 May 1984 by Virgin Records. Following the worldwide success of their previous studio album Dare (1981), the band struggled to make a successful follow-up and the sessions for Hysteria were fraught with problems. The album title itself is taken from the problematic recording period.The centre gatefold features a collage of the band sitting around in a large living room watching the Norman Wisdom 1965 film The Early Bird. Record producers Martin Rushent and Chris Thomas both left the project which would eventually be finished by producer Hugh Padgham.

Hysteria attained relatively lacklustre success in comparison to its multi-platinum predecessor. Three singles from the album reached the top 20 of the UK singles chart, and "The Lebanon" was the only single to chart in the United States, peaking at number 64 on the Billboard Hot 100. The album peaked at number three on the UK Albums Chart and has been certified Gold by the British Phonographic Industry (BPI), denoting shipments in excess of 100,000 copies.

In 2005, Hysteria was remastered and reissued with B-sides and extended mixes as bonus tracks.

The song "Rock Me Again and Again and Again and Again and Again and Again (Six Times)" is a cover version of a 1973 song by Lyn Collins and James Brown. "I Love You Too Much" is a substantially remixed version from their extended play (EP) Fascination! (1983) and "Don't You Know I Want You" is a reworked version of the instrumental B-side "Total Panic!" that appeared on the "(Keep Feeling) Fascination" single in 1983.

== Track listing ==
Side one

1. "I'm Coming Back" (Philip Oakey, Philip Adrian Wright) – 4:07
2. "I Love You Too Much" (Ian Burden, Jo Callis, Wright) – 3:26
3. "Rock Me Again and Again and Again and Again and Again and Again (Six Times)" (Lee Austin, James Brown) – 3:32
4. "Louise" (Callis, Oakey, Wright) – 4:55
5. "The Lebanon" (Callis, Oakey) – 5:03

Side two

6. "Betrayed" (Oakey, Wright) – 4:02
7. "The Sign" (Burden, Callis, Oakey) – 3:46
8. "So Hurt" (Burden, Oakey) – 3:53
9. "Life on Your Own" (Callis, Oakey, Wright) – 4:06
10. "Don't You Know I Want You" (Burden, Callis, Oakey) – 3:09

2005 CD bonus tracks

11. "Thirteen" (from "The Lebanon" 12-inch single, and 7" B-side)
12. "The World Tonight" (from "Life on Your Own" 12-inch single, and 7" B-side)
13. "The Lebanon" (extended version)
14. "Life on Your Own" (extended version)
15. "The Sign" (extended version)

== Personnel ==
Credits adapted from the liner notes of Hysteria.

Musicians

- Ian Burden – bass guitar, keyboards, guitar
- Jo Callis – guitar, keyboards, vocals
- Joanne Catherall – vocals
- Philip Oakey – vocals, programming, keyboards
- Susanne Sulley – vocals
- Philip Adrian Wright – occasional keyboards
- The Human League – percussion, programming
- Martin Rushent – drum programming (tracks 2, 8, 10)
- Jim Russell – drum programming (track 7)

Technical

- Hugh Padgham – mixing, production, engineering
- Chris Thomas – production
- The Human League – production
- Bill Price – engineering
- Renate Blauel – engineering
- Gavin MacKillop – engineering
- Steve Jackson – engineering assistance
- David Motion – engineering assistance
- Jeremy Allom – engineering assistance
- Paul "Croydon" Cook – engineering assistance

Artwork

- Simon Fowler – photography
- Ken Ansell – layout

== Charts ==
=== Weekly charts ===
Weekly chart performance for Hysteria
Chart (1984)	Peak position
Australian Albums (Kent Music Report)	18
Canada Top Albums/CDs (RPM)	43
Dutch Albums (Album Top 100)	16
European Albums (Music & Media)	16
Finnish Albums (Suomen virallinen lista)	26
German Albums (Offizielle Top 100)	44
New Zealand Albums (RMNZ)	9
Swedish Albums (Sverigetopplistan)	6
UK Albums (Official Charts)	3
US Billboard 200	62

=== Year-end charts ===
Year-end chart performance for Hysteria
Chart (1984)	Position
UK Albums (Gallup)	62

== Certifications ==
Certifications for Hysteria
Region	Certification	Certified units/sales
United Kingdom (BPI)	Gold	100,000^{^}
^{^} Shipments figures based on certification alone.

== Gallery ==
Outer front (right) and back of original UK LP gatefold edition

A portion of inner sleeve for the gatefold edition

Back of original UK CD's booklet

Back cover (Tracklist) of original UK CD

Front cover of original US cassette
