= Crash (The Human League album) =

1986 studio album by the Human League

Studio album by the Human League
- Released: 8 September 1986
- Recorded: 1986
- Studios: Flyte Time (Minneapolis, Minnesota)
- Genres: Pop; R&B
- Length: 44:38
- Label: Virgin
- Producer: Jimmy Jam and Terry Lewis

The Human League chronology
Hysteria (1984)	Crash (1986)	Romantic? (1990)

Singles from Crash
- 1. "Human" Released: 11 August 1986; 2. "I Need Your Loving" Released: 10 November 1986; 3. "Love Is All That Matters" Released: 3 February 1987

Crash is the fifth studio album by the English synth-pop band the Human League, released on 8 September 1986 by Virgin Records. The album would provide the band with their second US number-one single, "Human", the same year. It was produced by the American production team of Jimmy Jam and Terry Lewis, who also wrote several tracks.

== Background ==
After spending two years recording their fourth album Hysteria, which met with only moderate commercial success, the band struggled to record further material. They recorded some new material with producer Colin Thurston at their 24-track studio in Sheffield and later Utopia Studios in London, who previously worked with them on the Reproduction album. However, the sessions did not work out after four months, partly because of the slow progress, Thurston's and the band's combined indecisiveness and the negative atmosphere surrounding the sessions. Once Thurston left for his honeymoon, he let his assistant Paul Rabiger take over the rest of the sessions, who would be credited for keyboards and arrangements on the final album; even so, the sessions continued to remain slow and unfocused without a producer at the helm.

By 1985, musician/songwriter Jo Callis had left the group. Virgin Records, worried by the lack of progress in one of their leading acts, called the band principals to a meeting. As the problem was perceived to be the lack of production progress, it was suggested that the band take up an offer to work with Minneapolis-based production duo Jimmy Jam and Terry Lewis. Jam and Lewis had written for and produced the S.O.S. Band, Cherrelle and Alexander O'Neal, and had just finished working on Janet Jackson's breakthrough album Control. They had developed an interest in the Human League after the success of their US releases; they were also seeking an opportunity to cross over into mainstream pop and saw the Human League as the perfect opportunity.

In February 1986, the Human League flew to Minneapolis to work at Flyte Time Studios with Jam and Lewis, who finally helped bring more focus and direction to the album. The basic arrangements for the band's material were worked out in England using sequencers, which Jam and Lewis had re-cut with the parts all played by hand for a more natural feel: the liner notes reinforce that "there are no sequencers on this album." According to Oakey in a 1986 interview, for the band's songs, only the drum machine parts were kept from the London recordings with Thurston and Rabiger.

Unlike on previous albums, the band allowed Jam and Lewis assume control as producers, with Philip Oakey adding that the band "had enough respect for them musically" and felt were talented enough to take on the responsibility. Jam and Lewis got along well with the band for the most part, and helped get the record down more quickly and efficiently under their direction. The band stayed in Minneapolis for four months in total: three weeks for basic tracks, followed by two months on vocals and the rest for mixing their own songs. However, it was towards the end that disagreements arose with Jam and Lewis, resulting in Oakey pulling the band out of the sessions. They returned to Sheffield, leaving Jam and Lewis to take over and mix the four songs they contributed.

Oakey reflected later on:

We like to be in control in the studio. We don't like giving that up to a producer. That's why we had a big, final argument, and we just decided to go home and leave them to finish it off. It just got to the point of who had the power, and in that instance...They were the men behind the mixing console, so they had ultimate control.

Keyboard players Philip Adrian Wright and Ian Burden also had been sidelined by Jam and Lewis. "I really wished we were back in Berkshire (where Dare was recorded) with Martin Rushent, making a Human League album," Burden recalled. "It was gratifying to get a US number one with 'Human', but otherwise the album was a crashing bore in every sense." Wright would not recover from the humiliation and left the band upon their return to the UK. Burden eventually quit in 1987.

The album name was taken from a moment in the studio during the recording. Oakey described it thus:

It's from a crash cymbal, because it's a disco album again with lots of cymbals. One day somebody said "what sorts of cymbals do you want, a ride or a crash?", and we thought, "what a great title!"

The album quickly became an unexpected success. One of Jam and Lewis's compositions, "Human", became the Human League's second number-one single on the US Billboard Hot 100 and their first UK top 10 single in over three years, peaking at number eight. Follow-ups "I Need Your Loving" and the 1988 release "Love Is All That Matters" were less successful, failing to reach the UK top 40. The album itself peaked at number seven in the UK (where it has been certified Gold for shipments in excess of 100,000 copies) and number 24 on the US Billboard 200. Oakey stated his discomfort with the record in 1995, saying: "The Jam and Lewis album [Crash] was just like being a puppet for four months. It was interesting to pick yourself out of the industrial north of England and dump yourself in Minneapolis. Great experience, but it just wasn't our album."

However, in 2015, producer Jimmy Jam mentioned that the primary source of tension between the Human League and Jam and Lewis was the issue of background vocals. Jam thought Sulley and Catherall were good singers, but wanted to use them for the spoken parts on "Human". Jam and Lewis brought in their session vocalist Lisa Keith, who – with Lewis – performed the background vocals. This caused a rift between the producers and the group, which was started by Catherall who was discussing the issue with Oakey at the time of recording. Catherall did not like the idea of another female voice on the album, while Jam and Lewis thought Keith's vocals added to the songs. Jam explained:

The next day we got to the studio. Phil was seeing one of the girls in the group named Joanne. And she was the one raising a stink about the other girl being on the song. Phil walked in and told us, "I have to say. I don't like the idea of another girl being on our record." We said, "What?" He repeated, "I have to say. I don't like the idea of another girl being on our record." We said, "Oh. We get it. We got you. You just have to say it. We got it. Perfect." We called the record company and told them, "We either have your first single or a record that is off the album. And you guys can figure out how you want to handle it." I told Jordan Harris, who was the Virgin/A&M Records A&R at the time that, "We think the song is perfect the way it is. We don't want to change anything about it. And by the way, the songs we wrote, we're going to finish them the way we want to finish them. That's the way it should be. The songs they wrote they can finish them however they want to, but our songs we're going to finish them the way we want to finish them." And he said, "That sounds fair. It makes total sense." I said, "So we're not taking the girl off 'Human' because we think the song sounds perfect the way it is."

In 2005, Crash was re-issued with extended versions of the three singles.

== Artwork ==
The out-of-focus cover photo was used to disguise the fact that it was taken at very short notice to meet a print deadline, after the disaster of the planned original photo shoot. Oakey originally wanted to return to the Vogue cover style of Dare artwork for Crash. He had persuaded Virgin Records to finance a studio photo shoot of the band with Vogue's Paris-based photographer Guy Bourdin. The band were flown out to Paris for the two-day photo sessions. However, on arriving at Bourdin's studio, it became apparent that he was only interested in photographing the two female vocalists Susan Ann Sulley and Joanne Catherall. Matters came to a head when Bourdin ordered Sulley to do a handstand wearing a mini-skirt, a pose she considered inappropriate. After she turned on Bourdin and the two clashed angrily, the photographer refused to work with the band and they walked out of the session with the loss of all fees. Oakey would later comment that "we spent two days there, it took nine hours to set up one photograph and I daren't tell you how much money we spent."

== Critical reception ==
Professional ratings
Review scores
Source	Rating
AllMusic	3/5 stars
The Boston Phoenix	3/4 stars
Deseret News	3.5/4 stars
Number One	5/5 stars
The Philadelphia Inquirer	2/4 stars
Q	4/5 stars
Record Mirror	5/5
Rolling Stone	3.5/5 stars
Smash Hits	7½/10
Windsor Star	B+

Ken Tucker of The Philadelphia Inquirer gave the album a two stars out of four rating, stating that the group's collaboration with Jimmy Jam and Terry Lewis "should have been exciting, but instead they are merely fitfully enjoyable since the melodies are wispy and the vocals weak." AllMusic's William Ruhlmann considered Crash a collection of "songs with appealing backing tracks that maintained their dance appeal while eschewing the overtly synthesized sound of previous albums", which made it "an improvement over the lackluster Hysteria, but still not on a par with Dare."

In the 2004 edition of The Rolling Stone Album Guide, in a review of the Human League's entire discography at the time, Crash was noted for featuring two sounds, one praised for "sounding like the Human League of yore, albeit with a better rhythm section", and the other criticised for "coming across like contemporary R&B sung by the generally soulless Oakey, Sulley, and Catherall." Of the album's ten tracks, the lead single "Human" was called a highlight for "find[ing] the perfect middle ground [between the two sounds]".

== Track listing ==
Side one
No.	Title	Writer(s)	Length
1.	"Money"	Ian Burden; Philip Oakey; Jim Russell	3:54
2.	"Swang"	David Eiland	4:37
3.	"Human"	James Harris III; Terry Lewis	4:24
4.	"Jam"	Oakey; Russell	4:19
5.	"Are You Ever Coming Back?"	Oakey; Russell; Wright	4:52

Side two
No.	Title	Writer(s)	Length
6.	"I Need Your Loving"	Harris; Lewis; Eiland; Langston Richey; Danny Williams; Herman Davis	3:43
7.	"Party"	Burden; Oakey; Russell	4:29
8.	"Love on the Run"	Burden; Oakey; Russell	3:54
9.	"The Real Thing"	Burden; Steven Fellows; Oakey; Russell	4:19
10.	"Love Is All That Matters"	Harris; Lewis	6:07
Total length:			44:38

2005 remastered reissue bonus tracks
No.	Title	Writer(s)	Length
11.	"Human" (extended version)	Harris; Lewis	5:04
12.	"I Need Your Loving" (extended version)	Harris; Lewis; Eiland; Richey; Williams; Davis	7:16
13.	"Love Is All That Matters" (extended version)	Harris; Lewis	7:47
Total length:			64:45

== Personnel ==
=== The Human League ===
- Ian Burden
- Joanne Catherall
- Philip Oakey
- Jim Russell
- Susan Ann Sulley
- Philip Adrian Wright

=== Additional musicians ===
- Paul Rabiger – keyboard parts, arrangements
- Lisa Keith – background vocals

=== Technical ===
- Jimmy Jam and Terry Lewis – production
- Steve Hodge – engineering
- John McClain – executive production

=== Artwork ===
- Gavin Cochrane – photograph
- The Human League – cover design, layout
- Ken Ansell – cover design, layout
- The Design Clinic – coordination

== Charts ==
Chart performance for Crash
Chart (1986)	Peak position
Australian Albums (Kent Music Report)	32
Canada Top Albums/CDs (RPM)	25
Dutch Albums (Album Top 100)	40
European Albums (Music & Media)	22
German Albums (Offizielle Top 100)	14
New Zealand Albums (RMNZ)	33
Swedish Albums (Sverigetopplistan)	32
UK Albums (Official Charts)	7
US Billboard 200	24
US Top R&B/Hip-Hop Albums (Billboard)	28

== Certifications ==
Certifications for Crash
Region	Certification	Certified units/sales
Canada (Music Canada)	Gold	50,000^{^}
United Kingdom (BPI)	Gold	100,000^{^}
^{^} Shipments figures based on certification alone.
