= Love Is All That Matters =

Single by The Human League

from the album Crash
- Released: 3 October 1988
- Recorded: 1986 at Flyte Time in Minneapolis
- Genre: Disco
- Length: 4:06
- Label: Virgin
- Songwriter: Jimmy Jam and Terry Lewis
- Producers: Jimmy Jam and Terry Lewis

The Human League singles chronology
"I Need Your Loving" (1986)	"Love Is All That Matters" (1988)	"Heart Like a Wheel" (1990)

"Love Is All That Matters" is a song by British synth-pop group the Human League. It was the third single to be taken from their fifth studio album, Crash (1986). It was released in 1986 in the US, where it did not chart. The single would be reissued in 1988 to promote the band's first greatest hits album; this version of the single featured a different tracklist and was released in every territory but the US.

== Background ==
It was recorded in early 1986 at the Flyte Time studios in Minneapolis while the Human League were in residence recording Crash with producers Jimmy Jam and Terry Lewis. This song, like many other from the album, was a love song aimed towards the United States market, where the first single from Crash, "Human", had reached number one. However, this single failed and only charted in the UK where it reached number 41. As a result of the disappointing sales there would be no further releases from Crash. "Love Is All That Matters" was released principally to promote the imminent release of the first Greatest Hits album in 1988.

== Cover artwork ==
Gatefold cover artwork

The cover artwork (expanded) designed by Ken Ansell, is actually a gatefold of a single photograph of Susan Ann Sulley, Philip Oakey and Joanne Catherall. On the front of the vinyl versions and the CD, only Oakey is visible.

== Critical reception ==
Graeme Kay from Smash Hits declared the song as "a flippin' corker", explaining, "It starts off with a mega-heavy disco beat, then in come the group's resident foxtresses Sue and Joanne who trill away over layer upon layer of tringly oriental type bells and after a while Philip Oakey starts to holler away frenziedly about "being faithful" 'cos "love is all that matters". Jolly good show."

== Music video ==
The accompanying music video for "Love Is All That Matters" was a result of Virgin Records beginning to lose faith in the Human League and being reluctant to invest in any further elaborate music videos; so the video was kept deliberately low budget. The video is basically edited clips of all the band's previous music videos to that point, spliced together with animated stills from the key points from those videos. This was also designed to provide a storyboard which promoted the band's back catalogue to generate interest in the Greatest Hits compilation, the principal reason "Love Is All That Matters" was released in the first place.

== Track listing ==
=== 1986 US release ===
- 12" vinyl (A&M Records SP-12227)
1. "Love Is All That Matters (Extended Version)" – 7:45
2. "Love Is All That Matters (7" Edit)" – 4:06
3. "Love Is All That Matters (A Cappella)" – 2:45
4. "Love Is All That Matters (Instrumental)" – 4:09

=== 1988 international release ===
- 7" vinyl (Virgin VS1025)
1. "Love Is All That Matters (Edit)" – 4:06
2. "I Love You Too Much" – 3:22
- 12" vinyl (Virgin VST1025)
1. "Love Is All That Matters (Extended Version)" – 7:45
2. "I Love You Too Much (Dub)" – 5:54
3. "Love Is All That Matters (Edit)" – 4:06
- CD (Virgin VSCD1025)
1. "Love Is All That Matters (Edit)" – 4:06
2. "I Love You Too Much (Dub Version)" – 5:54
3. "Love Is All That Matters (Extended Version)" – 7:45

=== 2023 digital release ===
- digital and streaming platforms
1. "Love Is All That Matters (Edit)" - 4:12
2. "Love Is All That Matters (Extended Version)" – 7:47
3. "Love Is All That Matters (Accappella version)" – 2:45
4. "Love Is All That Matters (Instrumental)" – 4:08
5. "I Love You Too Much (Dub Version)" – 5:56
6. "Are You Ever Coming Back? (7" edit)" – 4:25

== Charts ==
=== Weekly charts ===
Chart (1988)	Peak position
Italy Airplay (Music & Media)	18
United Kingdom (Official Singles Chart)	41
