= Stay with Me Tonight (The Human League song) =

Single by the Human League

from the album Greatest Hits
- Released: 8 January 1996
- Recorded: 1995
- Studio: Human League (Sheffield, England)
- Genre: Hi-NRG
- Length: 4:04
- Label: East West
- Songwriters: Philip Oakey; Ian Stanley
- Producer: Ian Stanley

The Human League singles chronology
"Filling Up with Heaven" (1995)	"Stay with Me Tonight" (1996)	"All I Ever Wanted" (2001)

Licensed audio
- "Stay with Me Tonight" on YouTube

"Stay with Me Tonight" is a song by the English synth-pop band the Human League, released in January 1996 by East West Records as a single from their second compilation album, Greatest Hits (1995). It was jointly written by Philip Oakey and producer Ian Stanley, features lead vocals by Oakey; with backing by co-vocalists Susan Ann Sulley and Joanne Catherall. Post production by re-mixers 'Space Kittens'.

== Background ==
"Stay with Me Tonight" was recorded at Human League Studios in Sheffield during 1995. It was released as a single in the UK on 8 January 1996 by East West Records, where it reached number 40 in the UK singles chart (the band's final UK Top 40 hit to date) remaining on the chart for two weeks. The track is the only exclusive track on the 1995 version of the Greatest Hits compilation album.

Lyrically the song is (another) story by Oakey about being left by a girlfriend, and is written about their last night together.

== Critical reception ==
It was critically well received, but was not heavily promoted and did not sell in large enough quantities to make any impact on the charts.

In her review of the song, Jennifer Nine from Melody Maker remarked "those backing vocals! Oooh, that unabashed Oakey glide! Ahhh, those ludicrously Sputniktastic synths!" Mark Beaumont from NME described it as "a sparkling Hi-NRG pop sucker-punch swathed in synthesized sitars and containing approximately six-eights of a tune." Music Week gave "Stay with Me Tonight" three out of five, adding, "The League are on a roll, but this frenetic new offering written for their Greatest Hits package works best in its pounding club mixes." James Hamilton from the Record Mirror Dance Update described it as "bin shaking dynamite for megawatt speaker".

== Music video ==
No official music video was ever recorded or released for "Stay with Me Tonight". However, in 1997 producer John von Ahlen of Subterrane Records created an unofficial video that was distributed on the internet. The von Ahlen video utilized animated stills using 3dfx and version 4.2 of Adobe Premiere. It has now become the de facto music video for the track.

== Track listings ==
- 12" vinyl

A1 "Stay with Me Tonight" (The Biff & Memphis Remix) – 6:45
A2 "Stay with Me Tonight" (Space Kittens Vocal Mix) – 8:35
B1 "Stay with Me Tonight" (Biff & Memphis Dub Mix) – 6:46
B2 "Stay with Me Tonight" (Space Kittens Future Dub) – 9:01

- CD single
1. "Stay with Me Tonight" (single version) – 4:00
2. "Stay with Me Tonight" (Space Kittens Vocal Mix) – 8:35
- CD maxi
1. “Stay with Me Tonight” (single version) - 4:00
2. "Stay with Me Tonight" (Space Kittens Vocal Mix) – 8:35
3. "Stay with Me Tonight" (Space Kittens Future Dub) – 9:01
4. "Stay with Me Tonight" (The Biff & Memphis Remix) – 6:45
5. "Stay with Me Tonight" (The Biff & Memphis Dub) – 6:46

== Charts ==
Chart (1996)	Peak position
Latvia (Latvijas Top 50)	19
Scotland (OCC)	42
UK Singles (OCC)	40
UK Dance (OCC)	30
UK Airplay (Music Week)	50
UK Club Chart (Music Week)	15
