= The Lebanon (song) =

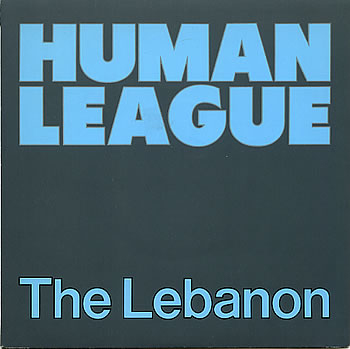

Single by the Human League

from the album Hysteria
- B-side: "Thirteen"
- Released: 24 April 1984
- Recorded: 1983–1984
- Studio: AIR (London)
- Genre: Synth-pop · electronic rock
- Length: 3:37 (single version); 5:05 (album version); 5:53 (extended version)
- Label: Virgin
- Songwriters: Philip Oakey; Jo Callis
- Producers: Chris Thomas; Hugh Padgham

The Human League singles chronology
"(Keep Feeling) Fascination" (1983)	"The Lebanon" (1984)	"Life on Your Own" (1984)

Audio sample
- file; help

Music video
- "The Lebanon" on YouTube

"The Lebanon" is a song by the English synth-pop band the Human League, released as a single on 24 April 1984 by Virgin Records. Written jointly by lead vocalist Philip Oakey and keyboardist and guitarist Jo Callis, it was the first single from the band's fourth studio album Hysteria. It was recorded at AIR Studios in London during 1983–1984.

== Background ==
The song was conceived, written and recorded at a time when the band were under considerable pressure to provide Virgin Records with a follow-up studio album to equal the enormous international success of Dare (1981). The band was recording in the £1,000-per-day AIR Studios, where they remained for a full year, frequently arguing with each other.

The lyrics were a statement on the Lebanese Civil War, a multifaceted armed conflict that took place from 1975 to 1990. In a television interview, band member Philip Adrian Wright commented that Oakey's lyrics were written specifically about the Sabra and Shatila massacre that took place in September 1982. Vocalist Susan Ann Sulley said that the band "wanted to speak up for the little people" and say something meaningful about the situation in Lebanon. The band were criticised in Number One magazine as banal and "out of their depth", and the lyrics were in 2007 voted 9th in a readers poll held by BBC Radio 6 Music on the "worst lyrics of all time". But in a retrospective review, AllMusic journalist Andy Kellman wrote that the song "looks atrocious on paper but sounds fantastic".

"The Lebanon" was released as a single in the UK in April 1984. It failed to replicate the success of the band's previous singles "(Keep Feeling) Fascination" and "Mirror Man", only reaching #11 on the UK singles chart and #64 on the Billboard Hot 100, becoming the band's lowest-charting single in the US.

== Music video ==
The music video for the song was filmed at the Theatre Royal, Central London in March 1984. The video appears to be filmed at a Human League concert with the band playing live on stage, but the concert was staged and the band mimed to the music. The audience were invited extras and dancers placed in the front of the stage.

== Critical reception ==
Upon its release, Andy Strike of Record Mirror described the song as "a grower" and added that it is "heavier than the League's last couple of singles". He commented, "Jo Callis rediscovers his guitar and adds a U2/Public Image Ltd riff to the normal synth and deep throat backing."

== Track listing ==
7-inch vinyl (Virgin VS 672)

1. "The Lebanon" – 3:45
2. "Thirteen" – 4:10

12-inch vinyl (Virgin VS 672-12)

1. "The Lebanon" – 5:52
2. "Thirteen" – 5:00
3. "The Lebanon" (instrumental) – 5:07
