= Philip Adrian Wright =

English musician

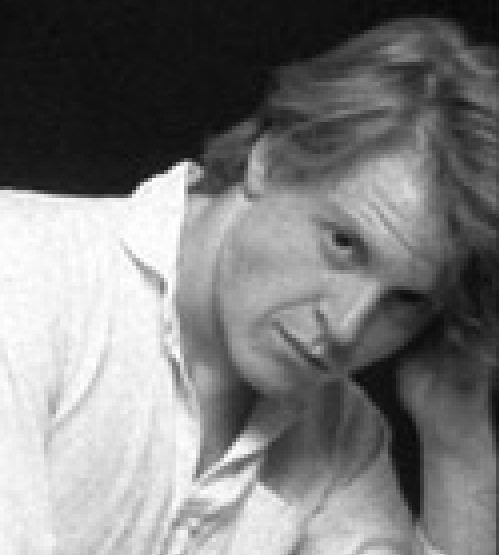
- Adrian Wright

Background information
- Born: 30 June 1956 (age 70); Wakefield, Yorkshire, England
- Genres: Synth-pop
- Occupations: Composer; musician
- Instrument: Synthesizers
- Years active: 1978–1986
- Labels: Virgin; EMI
- Formerly of: The Human League

Philip Adrian Wright (born 30 June 1956) is an English musician, also known as Adrian Wright.

Wright had studied film making at Sheffield Art College and was a friend of Philip Oakey. In 1978, he was invited to join the new avant-garde electronic band The Human League which consisted of Oakey, Martyn Ware and Ian Craig Marsh. Then a non-musician, Wright was appointed as 'Director of Visuals' whose job was to provide lighting and slideshows to accompany the Human League's live concerts.

When the Human League split in October 1980, Wright sided with Oakey, while Ware and Marsh left to form Heaven 17 – as such, Wright became a musician in his own necessity, and he quickly learned keyboards.

Wright and Oakey co-wrote some of the new Human League's songs including the number one hit "Don't You Want Me", plus tracks such as "Darkness", "I Am the Law" and "The Things That Dreams Are Made Of" for the album Dare. Wright also designed the album sleeve for Dare.

He remained a key member of the Human League during the early 1980s both as a composer and keyboard player. He left the band in 1986 after becoming disillusioned with the musical direction Oakey was taking and feeling marginalized by their new producers during the recording of the album Crash in Minneapolis.

After The Human League, he worked in film before moving into design.

In 1999, he participated in the BBC documentary on The Human League, part of the Young Guns Go For It series.

== Present day ==
Wright has worked with his wife, fashion-turned-furniture designer Tracey Boyd. The couple live in Chelsea, London.

== Awards ==
- 1982 BRIT Awards (as member of The Human League) – 'Best British Breakthrough Act'
