= Soundtrack to a Generation (song) =

Single by the Human League

from the album Romantic?
- Released: 12 November 1990
- Recorded: 1990
- Studio: Human League (Sheffield, England)
- Length: 4:21
- Label: Virgin
- Songwriter(s): Philip Oakey; Neil Sutton
- Producer(s): Bob Kraushaar

The Human League singles chronology
"Heart Like a Wheel" (1990)	"Soundtrack to a Generation" (1990)	"Tell Me When" (1994)

Music video
- "Soundtrack to a Generation" on YouTube

"Soundtrack to a Generation" is a song by English synth-pop band the Human League. It is taken from the album Romantic?, from 1990.

== Background ==
"Soundtrack to a Generation" is the second and final single to be taken from Romantic?. It would be the band's final original release under their contract with Virgin. It was written by lead singer Philip Oakey and keyboard player Neil Sutton and features vocals by Oakey, Joanne Catherall and Susan Ann Sulley.

It was recorded at Human League Studios in Sheffield during 1990 and produced by Bob Kraushaar. After the moderate success of "Heart Like a Wheel" in 1990, Virgin agreed to release a second single from Romantic? In an attempt to resurrect their past, the band advertised the track as 'Red', a reference to their old early 1980s labelling system of 'Red' for dance tracks and 'Blue' for pop songs.

== Release ==
Released in the UK in November 1990, "Soundtrack to a Generation" reached only number 77 in the UK Singles Chart, and charted for two weeks. It was to be the worst performance of a Human League single for ten years.

After losing money on the single's promotion and its music video, it would be the point that Virgin ran out of patience with the Human League. There would be no further releases from Romantic? and within a year the band would be dropped by the label.

== Music video ==
The music video for "Soundtrack to a Generation" was a simply shot studio performance of the song with video smudge effects and a video overlay of falling leaves to give an "autumn" effect. The band's dress style had been a deliberate attempt to distance themselves from the over-stylized, late-1980s videos. There was little change in Catherall, but Oakey had re-adopted long hair and wore leather chaps. Susan Ann Sulley had adopted a "Supermodel" style of a very short dress and bouffant blonde hair. The video would be keyboard player and co-songwriter Neil Sutton's first on-screen appearance with the band.

== Critical reception ==
On its release, Gary Crossing of Record Mirror was critical of "Soundtrack to a Generation", describing it as one of "three poor songs flung together with some irritating groans and Mickey Mouse impersonations thrown in". He added it "wouldn't even make the soundtrack to The Generation Game, let alone any other pompous aspirations it may have". Edwin Pouncey of New Musical Express considered it "mediocre twaddle" which "sounds like something they've sampled from the soundtrack of a John Carpenter movie which has then been sanitised for the dancefloor". David Stubbs of Melody Maker felt the song was "one of the duller, more dolorous tracks" from Romantic? and added, "William Orbit does his best with the remix, adding a glittery sprinkle of hypno-beats, but this is way out of kilter with present-day tastes."

== Track listing ==
- CD 11990, Virgin (VSCDT 1303)
1. "Soundtrack to a Generation" (Edit) – 4:01
2. "Soundtrack to a Generation" (Orbit Mix) – 6:03
3. "Soundtrack to a Generation" (Instrumental) – 4:32
4. "Soundtrack to a Generation" (Pan Belgian Mix) – 4:40
- CD 2 1990, Virgin (VSCDX 1303)
1. "Soundtrack to a Generation" (Pan Belgian Dub) – 5:55
2. "Soundtrack to a Generation" (808 Mix Instrumental) – 4:44
3. "Soundtrack to a Generation" (Dave Dodd's Mix) – 6:07
4. "Soundtrack to a Generation" (Acapella) – 2:47
