= One Man in My Heart =

1995 single by the Human League

Single by the Human League

from the album Octopus
- B-side: "These Are the Days"
- Released: 6 March 1995
- Genre: Synth-pop
- Length: 4:03
- Label: EastWest
- Songwriters: Philip Oakey; Neil Sutton
- Producer: Ian Stanley

The Human League singles chronology
"Tell Me When" (1994)	"One Man in My Heart" (1995)	"Filling Up with Heaven" (1995)

Music video
- "One Man in My Heart" on YouTube

"One Man in My Heart" is a song by English synth-pop band the Human League, written by Neil Sutton and Philip Oakey. It was released as the second single from the band's seventh album, Octopus (1995), on 6 March 1995 by EastWest Records. A ballad, the song differs from all previous Human League tracks as the lead vocal is performed by band member Susan Ann Sulley, with spoken-word refrains from Oakey and contrasting backing from the third member, Joanne Catherall. The song received positive reviews from music critics and peaked at number 13 on the UK Singles Chart, spending eight weeks in the top 100. Its music video was directed by Andy Morahan. In 2001, The Guardian newspaper named "One Man in My Heart" one of the best love songs of the 1990s.

== Critical reception ==
Dave Thompson of AllMusic said "One Man in My Heart" "could have been a total throwaway, a gloopy little love song without a single redeeming quality, beloved by grannies and tweenies, gag-inducing for those outside those age parameters. But the band obviously gave the number time and attention, and thus ensured that it can't be so easily dismissed." He added that "the group produced a love song unlike virtually all typical pop fodder." Larry Flick from Billboard magazine was also highly favourable, writing that "this sophomore single from the act's comeback album Octopus needs no apologies for its innocent composition. It is a beautiful ballad that should set top 40 afire." Steve Baltin from Cash Box commented, "Given that it's impossible to write off the trio, even though this song also seems stuck in a time warp. While other bands from the era, specifically Duran Duran and Adam Ant, have reinvented their sound, the Human League have actually regressed, being more keyboard based than in their initial run. Still, there is something cute about the tune."

Anderson Jones from Entertainment Weekly described it as "melodramatic synth-pop-orchestrated". Music writer and columnist James Masterton noted that it is unusually featuring Catherall and Sulley on vocals completely on their own. "The result is a tender woman's ballad to which the expression 'lovely' could almost be said to have been coined." Jennifer Nine from Melody Maker wrote, "More enticing craftmanship sparkles in the music-box minuet of 'One Man in My Heart': tiny, shimmering, and ooh-la-la-luscious as Saint Etienne without the swotty paperwork." Another Melody Maker editor, Dave Simpson, said, "'One Man' is a straight(ish) love song, catchy as crabs and delivered with the slight awkwardness critics often mistake for irony." A reviewer from Music Week gave it four out of five, describing it as "a gorgeous semi-ballad that could be ABBA if you didn't know better." Criticism of Susan Ann Sulley's vocals was that she was too technically proficient making her sound "bland"; one critic declared that he missed "the rough edges of the girl plucked from the Sheffield dance floor". Tony Cross from Smash Hits gave it three out of five, writing, "This is repetitive but very, very sweet, as Susan (that's the blonde bird) gently whimpers of having one man in her heart and another in her head (must be getting a bit crowded round her way by now). It's moody, soothing and, though a little dull, a sure-fire hit."

== Music video ==
The accompanying music video for "One Man in My Heart" has a similar cinematography style to the video for the previous single "Tell Me When" and had the same director, Andy Morahan. It is set in a Parisian cafe and principally features (for this song) lead vocalist Susan Ann Sulley sat on her own having a coffee while singing to herself; whilst watching the other customers. Fellow band members Philip Oakey and Joanne Catherall are seated elsewhere in the cafe and the camera pans to them for their backing vocals and Oakey's incidental spoken words. The video received considerable play on VH1.

== Track listings ==
- UK CD1
1. "One Man in My Heart" – 4:03
2. "One Man in My Heart" (T.O.E.C. extended) – 8:29
3. "One Man in My Heart" (T.O.E.C. unplugged) – 4:15
4. "These Are the Days" (Sonic Radiation) – 7:03
- UK CD2
1. "These Are the Days" (Ba Ba mix) – 6:10
2. "These Are the Days" (Overworld mix) – 6:25
3. "These Are the Days" (Man With No Name vocal) – 6:52
4. "One Man in My Heart" (T.O.E.C. Nasty Sue mix) – 5:32
- UK 12-inch single

A1. "These Are the Days" (Ba Ba mix) – 6:09
A2. "These Are the Days" (symphonic Ba Ba mix) – 6:01
B1. "These Are the Days" (Man with No Name instrumental) – 6:51
B2. "One Man in My Heart" (T.O.E.C. unplugged) – 4:15

- UK cassette single
1. "One Man in My Heart"
2. "These Are the Days" (Sonic Radiation)
- European CD single
1. "One Man in My Heart" – 4:03
2. "One Man in My Heart" (T.O.E.C. extended) – 8:29
- European maxi-CD single
1. "One Man in My Heart" – 4:03
2. "One Man in My Heart" (T.O.E.C. radio edit) – 3:46
3. "One Man in My Heart" (T.O.E.C. unplugged) – 4:15
4. "These Are the Days" (Sonic Radiation) – 7:03
- US cassette single

A. "One Man in My Heart" (LP version) – 4:03
B. "These Are the Days" (Overworld mix) – 6:25

== Charts ==
=== Weekly charts ===
Chart (1995)	Peak position
Europe (Eurochart Hot 100)	60
Europe (European Hit Radio)	13
Germany (GfK)	90
Ireland (IRMA)	29
Israel (Israeli Singles Chart)	2
Scottish Singles Sales (Official Charts)	7
UK Singles (Official Charts)	13

=== Year-end charts ===
Chart (1995)	Position
Latvia (Latvijas Top 50)	20

== Release history ==
Region	Date	Format(s)	Label(s)	Ref.
United Kingdom	6 March 1995	Commercial	EastWest	
Australia	5 June 1995	CD	EastWest	
United States	13 June 1995	Contemporary hit radio	EastWest America	
