= Tell Me When =

1994 single by the Human League

Single by the Human League

from the album Octopus
- B-side: "The Bus to Crookes"
- Released: 26 December 1994
- Genre: Synth-pop; techno-pop
- Length: 4:42
- Label: East West
- Songwriters: Philip Oakey; Paul Christopher Beckett
- Producer: Ian Stanley

The Human League singles chronology
"Soundtrack to a Generation" (1990)	"Tell Me When" (1994)	"One Man in My Heart" (1995)

Audio sample
- file; help

Music video
- "Tell Me When" on YouTube

"Tell Me When" is a song by the English synth-pop band the Human League, released in December 1994 by East West Records as the first single from their seventh album, Octopus (1995). Written jointly by lead singer Philip Oakey and Paul C. Beckett, the song was produced by Ian Stanley (formerly of Tears for Fears).

"Tell Me When" received positive reviews from music critics, who singled it out as a standout track from the album. It peaked at number six on the UK Singles Chart, while reaching number four on the UK Dance Chart. In the US, it peaked at number 31 on the Billboard Hot 100, number 15 on the Billboard Hot Dance Club Play chart and number eight on the Cash Box Top 100. The accompanying music video for the song was directed by Andy Morahan and filmed in the Czech Republic.

== Background ==
The song was originally written for the act "Fast Arithmetic" (Oakey–Beckett), a side project in development within the Human League environment. A demo version was recorded in 1991 and presented to East West Records. It later became the first release by the Human League under East West, who had signed the band after their long-term contract with Virgin ended in 1992.

As it was the first commercial release by the band in four years, it was described in the media as a comeback. Oakey took issue with this description and said in an interview that the band had never stopped recording and performing since its formation in 1977. The band had collaborated with Yellow Magic Orchestra prior to signing with East West.

== Release and promotion ==
"Tell Me When" was the first Human League single to be released from Octopus. It was issued on 26 December 1994, four weeks ahead of the album. Released in a variety of vinyl and CD single formats, these variously included remixes of "Tell Me When" by contemporary electronic acts Utah Saints, Development Corporation and Red Jerry, a non-album B-side ("The Bus to Crookes"), and a track from the band's recent collaboration with Yellow Magic Orchestra. In Australia, the song was released on 30 January 1995.

"Tell Me When" became the Human League's most commercially successful single in nine years and reintroduced the band to the British general public. It received considerable radio promotion in advance of its late 1994 UK release, hitting the airwaves at a time when many people started to get Christmas song fatigue. Radio 1 played the song three weeks before release with Capital FM playing it two weeks prior. By the time of its release, the single received over one thousand plays per week across the board according to East West Records. One month after its release, the single steadily gained airplay on Europe's leading radio markets. It topped the Major Market Airplay charts in the UK for two weeks commencing 4 February, registering total plays of 915 for the week of 11 February. According to East West Records, the single had achieved sales of around 200,000 copies. Capital 95.8 head of music Richard Park welcomed the single, saying "the marketplace is just ready for a fresh dose of the Human League". It peaked at number six on the UK Singles Chart in early 1995, their highest UK chart position since "(Keep Feeling) Fascination" reached number two in 1983, and spent a total of nine weeks on the chart. It also peaked at number 31 on the Billboard Hot 100, on 15 April 1995, giving the band their last hit to date in the United States. The song fared well on the Top 40/Mainstream chart, where it peaked at number nine on 22 April 1995. Additionally, it reached number eight on the Cash Box Top 100.

== Critical reception ==
Several critics of the Octopus album, singled out "Tell Me When" as a standout track. Dave Thompson of AllMusic said it echoes earlier material, likening it to "Fascination" and "Mirror Man". He went further, saying that "the real difference is found in the vignette-esque lyrics and the more complex vocals. And these slight changes make all the difference, turning synth dreams into techno club success." David Bauder of Associated Press called the song "splendid", and noted that it is a "shimmering melody, with Kraftwerk-like synthesizers and Phil Oakey's arch voice sweetened by his two female colleagues. It ranks with their best work." He added that it was the only song from the album "with any worth". Also Larry Flick from Billboard magazine was favourable, writing, "British synth-pop act that enjoyed a high profile during the '80s returns with a percolating swinger, which harkens back to its now-classic hits, 'Don't You Want Me' and 'Fascination'." He also named it a "disco-hooked number". Anderson Jones from Entertainment Weekly described it as "bubbly" and "radio-friendly", whilst calling the album "lackluster". In his weekly UK chart commentary, James Masterton said, "It may not be the biggest new hit of the week but it is certainly the most significant", concluding with that it is "sounding like typical Human League of old". Jennifer Nine from Melody Maker viewed it as "a brightly hopeful, wafer-thin compendium of standard League traits, including that pocket calculator-powered "funky" breakdown."

A reviewer from Music & Media commented, "Comeback of the year? That's up to you. Anyway, the return of the Sheffield synth band in the premier division of pop creates an enormous buzz in radio land." In the album review, the reviewer said that "Tell Me When" "portrays Phil Oakey and the girls as a perfect replica of the electro pop band around 1981's Dare album." Music Week gave the single a top score of five out of five, describing it as "pristine synth pop as a deep Oakey lead and girl harmonies make this the most joyful single of the week. Welcome back." John Kilgo from The Network Forty wrote, "This is a great comeback for the Sheffield, England trio! A techno-pop release full of energy highlighted by a very catchy hook. This smash is a no-brainer." Steve Sutherland from NME praised it as "pretty damn near" the Human League "at their best". Another NME editor, Paul Moody, viewed it as "sublimely clumsy" with "this killer Human League chorus all over it, the sort that rings around your brain like a nursery rhyme from Mars." People Magazine stated that "their hot new single 'Tell Me When' has made the Human League hip again". They added, "But the tune is an infectious anachronism—the synthesizer trio still tinkle about as soullessly as they did in 1982, when they hit No. 1 with 'Don't You Want Me'." James Hamilton from the Record Mirror Dance Update named it "typical Human League holler" in his weekly dance column. Tony Cross from Smash Hits felt it's "the best thing" on the album. David Sinclair of The Times commented, "All the familiar components are here join-the-dots tune, danceable synth-pop arrangement, catchy bubblegum chorus but the result sounds disconcertingly like the Human League by numbers."

== Music video ==
A music video was produced to promote the single, and was shot entirely on location in Prague in the Czech Republic. It is directed by British director Andy Morahan. It uses reverse motion in several scenes. In the video, well-known sites in the city can be seen, as Wenceslas Square, Prague Castle and Wallenstein Garden. It opens with Catherall and Sulley in the Wallenstein Gardens, where leaves are blowing upwards instead of downwards. In some city scenes, Oakey walks in the streets, while other people are walking backwards. The band then performs in the main hall of the Wallenstein Palace, surrounded by lit candles and candelabras. In the outside scenes, Catherall wears a black dress while Sulley wears a white dress. In the indoor scenes, they both wear black dresses with hat and a veil on their faces. "Tell Me When" received "break out" rotation on MTV Europe in February 1995.

== Legacy ==
In 2016, The Guardian ranked "Tell Me When" number nine in their list of "The Human League – 10 of the Best". Ian Wade noted, "No one would have expected a Human League comeback in 1995, the high summer of Britpop." In 2025, music magazine Classic Pop ranked it numbers 16 and two in their lists of the "Top 20 Comeback Singles" and "10 Best Human League Songs". Steve O'Brien wrote, "It may not have been marketed as such, but 'Tell Me When' was definitely a 'blue' Human League song, a crazily catchy pop number that would net the band their final – to date – Top 10 hit."

== Track listing ==
- CD 1 1994, East West (YZ882CD1)
1. "Tell Me When" (7-inch edit) – 4:42
2. "Tell Me When" (Mix 1) – 5:09 (remix by Utah Saints)
3. "Kimi Ni Mune Kyun (YMO Vs The Human League)" – 4:55
4. "The Bus to Crookes" – 4:52
- CD 2 1994, East West (YZ882CD2)
1. "Tell Me When" (Mix 2) – 6:11 (remix by Utah Saints)
2. "Tell Me When" (Red Jerry Remix) – 7:36
3. "Tell Me When" (Strictly Blind Dub) – 5:51 (remix by Development Corporation)
4. "Tell Me When" (Overworld Mix) – 6:26 (remix by Development Corporation)
5. "Tell Me When" (Mix 1) – 5:09 (remix by Utah Saints)
- US CD 1994, East West America (66147-2)
1. "Tell Me When" (Utah Saints Mix 2*) – 6:12
2. "Tell Me When" (Red Jerry Mix) – 7:36
3. "Tell Me When" (Strictly Blind Dub) – 5:51 (remix by Development Corporation)
4. "Tell Me When" (Edit Version Overworld Mix) – 5:25 (remix by Development Corporation)
5. "Tell Me When" (Utah Saints Mix 1*) – 5:09
  - (*) identical to the UK mixes

== Charts ==
=== Weekly charts ===
Chart (1995)	Peak position
Australia (ARIA)	110
Belgium (Ultratop 50 Flanders)	21
Canada Top Singles (RPM)	17
Europe (Eurochart Hot 100)	16
Europe (European Hit Radio)	3
Finland (IFPI)	11
Germany (GfK)	53
Iceland (Íslenski Listinn Topp 40)	27
Ireland (IRMA)	9
Israel (Israeli Singles Chart)	17
Netherlands (Dutch Top 40 Tipparade)	9
Netherlands (Single Top 100 Tipparade)	5
New Zealand (Recorded Music NZ)	47
Scottish Singles Sales (Official Charts)	7
UK Singles (Official Charts)	6
UK Dance (Official Charts)	4
UK Airplay (Music Week)	1
UK Club Chart (Music Week)	24
UK Pop Tip Club Chart (Music Week)	27
US Billboard Hot 100	31
US Adult Contemporary (Billboard)	39
US Dance Club Songs (Billboard)	15
US Dance Singles Sales (Billboard)	33
US Top 40/Mainstream (Billboard)	9
US Cash Box Top 100	8

=== Year-end charts ===
Chart (1995)	Position
Europe (European Hit Radio)	25
Latvia (Latvijas Top 50)	99
UK Singles (OCC)	96
UK Airplay (Music Week)	20
