= Mirror Man (The Human League song) =

Single by the Human League

from the album Fascination!
- B-side: "You Remind Me of Gold"
- Released: 12 November 1982
- Recorded: Genetic Studios (Streatley, Berkshire)
- Genre: Synth-pop; new wave
- Length: 3:52 (7"); 4:21 (12")
- Label: Virgin; A&M
- Songwriters: Philip Oakey; Jo Callis; Ian Burden
- Producer: Martin Rushent

The Human League singles chronology
"Don't You Want Me" (1981)	"Mirror Man" (1982)	"(Keep Feeling) Fascination" (1983)

Audio sample
- file; help

"Mirror Man" (or "(Here Comes The) Mirror Man") is a 1982 song by the English synth-pop band the Human League. It was released as a single in the UK on 12 November 1982 and peaked at number two in the UK singles chart. It was written jointly by their lead vocalist Philip Oakey with keyboardists Jo Callis and Ian Burden, and produced by Martin Rushent.

== Background ==
"Mirror Man" (originally titled "Can't Get To Sleep At Night") was the first track written and recorded by the Human League after they returned from their World Tour, conducted in the wake of the enormous international success of their album Dare. "Mirror Man" was conceived and written as a celebration of Oakey and Philip Adrian Wright's love of Motown records. It has been described as electronic northern soul, with Oakey's main verses delivered in deliberate sentences with emphasis on the last word of each sentence. Vocalists Susan Ann Sulley and Joanne Catherall feature prominently throughout the song but have no lyrics, providing backing vocals of "oohs" and "ahhs". Recording and production was overseen by Martin Rushent, who had produced the band's album Dare.

Speculation about who was the titular 'Mirror Man' was ended in 1988 when, during interviews to promote the band's Greatest Hits album, Oakey revealed that it was about Adam Ant. Oakey had become concerned that Ant was starting to believe his own publicity, and was in danger of losing touch with reality. Oakey had avoided revealing this at the time for fear of offending the song's subject.

The song was released as a single in the UK in November 1982. It was the first new single the band had released since the phenomenal success of "Don't You Want Me" almost a year earlier. The single was tipped by the media to be the band's second Christmas number-one single in the UK, but peaked just short, at number two. The single did however reach number one in Ireland earlier that month and also reached the Top 10 in Canada the following February.

Its release in the US was delayed until May 1983 where it was incorporated into the stop gap EP Fascination!. A&M Records, the band's record company in the US, had refused to release it as a single "unless there was to be an album hot on its heels". The track peaked at number 30 on the Billboard Hot 100 in the fall of 1983.

Cash Box described the song as "a cross between the Four Seasons' chestnut 'Let's Hang On,' and the rock-steady rhythms of the mid-'60s Motown vault."

The song is featured in the 1984 Cameron Crowe film The Wild Life (film).

== Promotional video ==
The promotional video for "Mirror Man" was conceived and directed by Brian Duffy and was filmed on location at a deserted theatre in London. The basic premise is that Oakey is a ghost of a performer who has died and now inhabits the theatre where he reveals himself to the band who have come to rehearse. The main scenes are of Oakey in a dressing room singing to a mirror, spliced in with footage of the crash and death of John Cobb (whilst attempting to break the world water speed record on Loch Ness on 29 September 1952). It is the lead track on The Human League Video Single.

== Track listing ==
7" (Virgin – VS522)

1. "Mirror Man" – 3:48
2. "You Remind Me of Gold" – 3:36

7" (A&M - AM-2587)

1. "Mirror Man" – 3:48
2. "Non-Stop" – 4:15

12" (Virgin – VS522-12)

1. "Mirror Man" – 4:21
2. "You Remind Me of Gold" – 3:36
3. "You Remind Me of Gold (Instrumental/Dub)" – 3:53

== Chart performance ==
=== Weekly charts ===
Weekly chart performance for "Mirror Man"
Chart (1982–1983)	Peak position
Australia (Kent Music Report)	4
Belgium (Ultratop 50 Flanders)	17
Canada Top Singles (RPM)	7
French Singles Chart	84
Germany (GfK)	49
Ireland (IRMA)	1
Netherlands (Single Top 100)	31
New Zealand (Recorded Music NZ)	23
Spain (AFYVE)	10
Sweden (Sverigetopplistan)	19
UK Singles (Official Charts)	2
US Billboard Hot 100	30

=== Year-end charts ===
Year-end chart performance for "Mirror Man"
Chart (1983)	Position
Australia (Kent Music Report)	67
Canada Top Singles (RPM)	64
