= Jo Callis =

British musician, songwriter

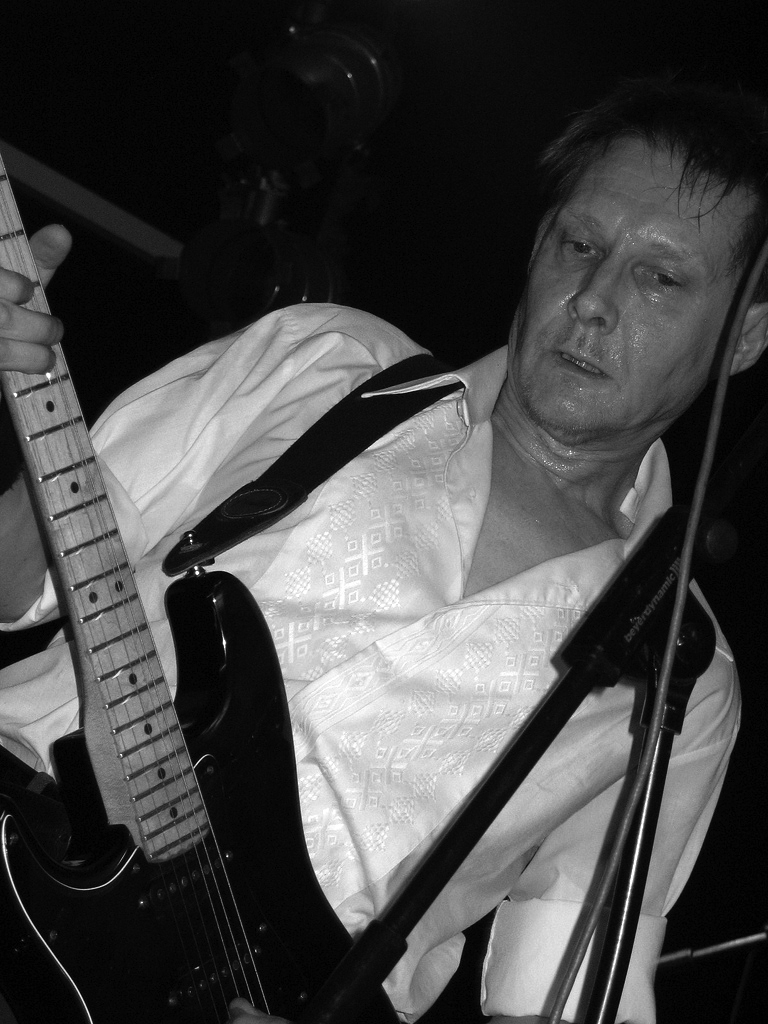
- Callis in 2008

Background information
- Born: John William Callis; 2 May 1951 (age 75); Rotherham, Yorkshire, England
- Genres: Punk rock; new wave; post-punk; synth-pop
- Occupations: Musician; songwriter
- Instruments: Guitar; keyboards; vocals
- Years active: 1977–present
- Label: Various

John William "Jo" Callis (born 2 May 1951) is a British musician and songwriter who played guitar with the Edinburgh based punk rock band the Rezillos (under the name Luke Warm) and post-punk band Boots for Dancing, before joining the Human League.

== Biography ==
Callis was educated at the Edinburgh College of Art. He was a member of the Knutsford Dominators before forming the Rezillos in 1976. The band played many gigs in Edinburgh and Glasgow, during which Callis wore space suits and other hi-tech costumes. He wrote the Rezillos' 1978 hit "Top of the Pops". In late 1978, after the release of the band's only album, the Rezillos split, with Callis forming Shake along with Simon Templar and Angel Paterson. Shake released two singles before splitting.

In 1981, Callis released a solo single, "Woah Yeah!", on the pop:Aural label. In the same year, he joined both Boots for Dancing and the Human League.

In the Human League, he played keyboards and lead guitar and contributed as a backing vocalist. He co-wrote many songs and, following his departure from the band in 1986, returned several times either to play keyboard or to help with songwriting. He co-wrote the band's 1990 hit "Heart Like a Wheel" together with former Rezillos bandmate Eugene Reynolds. The track was produced by Martin Rushent.

In 1985, he teamed up with Feargal Sharkey to write Sharkey's "Loving You", which reached number 26 in the UK Singles Chart.

== Discography ==
The Rezillos

- Can't Stand the Rezillos (1978) Sire SRK6057
- Mission Accomplished… But the Beat Goes On (1979) Sire 6069
- Can't Stand the Rezillos: The (Almost) Complete Rezillos (1993) Sire 9 26942-2

Shake

- Culture Shock (EP, 1979) Sire 4016

The Human League

- Dare (1981) Virgin V2192
- Love and Dancing (1982) Virgin OVED6
- Hysteria (1984) Virgin V2315
- Romantic? (1990) Virgin V2624, CDV2624
- Octopus (1995) East West 4509-98750-2
- Greatest Hits (1996) Virgin HLC1, HLCD1
- The Very Best of The Human League (2003) Virgin HLCDX2

== See also ==
- List of guitarists
- List of musicians who play left handed
- Bands and musicians from Yorkshire and North East England
