= Genetic Studios =

Coordinates: 51.5217°N 1.1585°W

Genetic Studios (also known as Genetic Sound) was a recording studio in Streatley, England.

== History ==
Genetic was established in 1980 by Martin Rushent and Alan Winstanley. The facility was built in a barn at Rushent's home in Streatley. Rushent decided to focus on electronic music after working heavily with guitar-based punk bands in the late 1970s – including The Buzzcocks and The Stranglers. Rushent began the studio after seeing an advertisement for the Roland Micro Composer. He thought the device looked "pretty good", and bought a Roland Jupiter synth to go with it.

Rushent purchased Synclavier and Fairlight CMI synthesisers (at £25,000 each) and an MCI console to use in the studio. He spent £35,000 on the studio's air conditioning system, and had a Mitsubishi Electric digital recorder costing £70,000.

After the success of Dare in 1981, Rushent extended the studio to house a second control room and recording booth. The MCI desk was moved to the new rooms, and a Solid State Logic (SSL) desk was bought to be used in the original studio. Rushent later said that the new desk "had the most advanced mix functions of any board available at the time, so everybody wanted to use it. What everybody missed was the fact that, in [his] view, the SSL may sound technically correct, but it's never sounded musically correct." He stated that he hated working on the SSL, and that it "ended up ruining [the] main control room."

Rushent sold his home and Genetic in 1989, and the studio continued to operate until the early 1990s. The complex was sold for £906,000 in 2000, then £1.5 million in a second sale 3 years later. The site was later demolished and in 2007 a planning application was submitted to West Berkshire Council to build a £12 million luxury home, which was later built.
