= (Keep Feeling) Fascination =

1983 single by the Human League

"Fascination"

Single by the Human League

from the album Fascination!
- B-side: "Total Panic"
- Released: 15 April 1983
- Studio: Genetic Sound (Streatley, Berkshire)
- Genre: Synth-pop; synth-funk; new wave
- Length: 4:59 (album version); 3:44 (single version)
- Label: Virgin
- Songwriters: Jo Callis; Philip Oakey
- Producer: Martin Rushent

The Human League singles chronology
"Mirror Man" (1982)	"Fascination" (1983)	"The Lebanon" (1984)

Music video
- "(Keep Feeling) Fascination" on YouTube

"(Keep Feeling) Fascination" is a song by the English synth-pop band the Human League. It was composed by Jo Callis and Philip Oakey, and produced by Martin Rushent (which would be the last song he produced for the band for seven years). The song features vocals from four of the band members, including lead vocalist Philip Oakey, female co-vocalists Susan Ann Sulley and Joanne Catherall, and a rare vocal role from keyboardist and guitarist Jo Callis.

Upon the song's release, it peaked at number two in the United Kingdom and entered the top 10 in Australia, Ireland, New Zealand and the United States. The single was designated 'Red' on the Human League's short-lived, self-imposed labelling system of 'Blue' for pop songs and 'Red' for dance tracks.

== Commercial performance ==
The single was released in the UK on 15 April 1983 as a non-album single, and went to number two on the UK singles chart. It was incorporated into the band's extended play (EP) Fascination!. Released in the US a month after the UK release, the single reached number one on the US Hot Dance Music/Club Play chart (their first single to do so) and number eight on the US Billboard Hot 100 that summer.

The EP Fascination! contained two versions of "(Keep Feeling) Fascination": the extended mix and an improvisation, both different from the single version. These were also the tracks featured on the 12-inch issue in the UK. The 7-inch issue featured a new instrumental track on the B-side, "Total Panic".

== Music video ==
A screenshot from the music video for "(Keep Feeling) Fascination"

The video for "(Keep Feeling) Fascination" was filmed in a semi-derelict area of Newham, London which was due for demolition and redevelopment as part of the widescale redevelopment of Docklands and East London which took place in the early 1980s. The video begins with an aerial view of an orange "you are here" dot on a street map, which is revealed as an actual giant orange dot on the ground as the camera zooms in. The dot highlights a single house on the apex of two streets, and the camera passes through a set of window curtains to show the band playing the song inside. The entire room is painted grey, as are the band's instruments and microphones. During the song's bridge, two boys are shown kicking a ball around in the street outside. Both the ball and one boy's clothes turn orange when they enter the dot; when he kicks the ball back, it returns to its original colour. As the song ends, the camera retreats from the room and zooms back out into the sky, the view changing back to the original map.

A view of the location of the "(Keep Feeling) Fascination" music video in 2014

Unusually for the Human League's music videos to this point, the band are all seen playing instruments as if it were a live performance. Philip Oakey said in 1983:

"The aim of the video is to show that we're a group who play music together ... This should help us in America where they believe we are a manufactured item mainly because we've never been live on TV there."

Both the house (which was First Avenue, London E13 8AP) and surrounding area (Junction of 1st Avenue and 3rd Avenue) encompassed by the orange dot were completely painted orange, including a nearby Austin 1800 car. The video was conceived and directed by the Irish-British filmmaker Steve Barron, who directed most of the Human League's early 1980s music videos. The band's scenes were all filmed in a studio; Susan Ann Sulley said that the house was still occupied by a family during the painting and filming of the external scenes. The house remained orange until being demolished in mid-1983.

== Track listings ==
7-inch vinyl (Virgin – VS 569)

1. "(Keep Feeling) Fascination" – 3:39
2. "Total Panic" – 3:23

12-inch vinyl (Virgin – VS569-12)

1. "(Keep Feeling) Fascination" (extended version) – 5:00
2. "(Keep Feeling) Fascination" (improvisation) – 6:15

Mini-CD (Virgin – CDT24)

1. "(Keep Feeling) Fascination" (extended 12-inch version) – 5:00
2. "(Keep Feeling) Fascination" (improvisation 12-inch dub) – 6:15
3. "Total Panic" – 3:23
  - CD released in 1988

== Charts ==
=== Weekly charts ===
Chart (1983)	Peak position
Australia (Kent Music Report)	8
Belgium (Ultratop 50 Flanders)	24
Belgium (VRT Top 30 Flanders)	23
Canada (CHUM)	16
Canada Top Singles (RPM)	13
Ireland (IRMA)	2
New Zealand (Recorded Music NZ)	3
South Africa (Springbok Radio)	16
Sweden (Sverigetopplistan)	18
UK Singles (Official Charts)	2
US Billboard Hot 100	8
US Dance/Disco Top 80 (Billboard)	1
US Hot Black Singles (Billboard)	56
US Mainstream Rock (Billboard)	14
US Cash Box Top 100	7

=== Year-end charts ===
Chart (1983)	Rank
Australia (Kent Music Report)	73
Canada Top Singles (RPM)	76
New Zealand (RIANZ)	26
UK Singles (OCC)	40
US Billboard Hot 100	33
US Dance/Disco Top 80 (Billboard)	18
US Cash Box Top 100	57

== Certifications ==
Region	Certification	Certified units/sales
Canada (Music Canada)	Gold	50,000^{^}
United Kingdom (BPI)	Silver	250,000^{^}
^{^} Shipments figures based on certification alone.

== In popular culture ==
- A cover version of the song recorded by the American singer Rob Crow (of Pinback), features in the 2010 commercial for Kingsford charcoal.
- A cover version of the song recorded by the Mexican Latin pop group OV7 features on the album Siete Latidos (2001).
- The track appears briefly in the American satirical action comedy film You Don't Mess with the Zohan (2008)
- The track is included in the soundtrack of videogame Grand Theft Auto: Vice City as part of the fictional radio station Wave 103.
