= Live at the Dome (The Human League concert video) =

Video by The Human League
- Released: November 2004
- Recorded: 19 December 2003
- Genre: Synth-pop
- Length: 2:54:00
- Label: Secret Records Limited
- Director: Dave Meehan

The Human League chronology
The Very Best of the Human League (2003)	Live at the Dome (2004)

The Human League Live at the Dome is a live concert performance released on DVD by the British group The Human League, recorded on 19 December 2003 at the Brighton Dome (the closing night of their 2003 tour). It was commissioned by the band themselves due to the success of Virgin Records' The Very Best of the Human League DVD the previous year; and the high uptake for their live concerts.

Also included is an interview of the band's principal members Philip Oakey, Susan Ann Sulley and Joanne Catherall filmed at HL Studios, Sheffield, conducted by 'Jet' Martin Celmins; and an 'Access All Areas' featurette which mainly presents some of the highlights of the groups successful tours of the US and Australia during 2003 filmed in a 'fly on the wall' style.

A companion two disc CD album was released in 2005 by Snapper Music called The Human League Live at the Dome.

The cover artworks for both the album and DVD was by Stig Olsen

The DVD was renamed The Sound Of The Crowd - Greatest Hits In Concert, and given a new cover design when the album was reissued under a new name in 2017.

== Contents ==
=== Concert set list ===
1. Intro
2. "Hard Times"
3. "Love Action (I Believe in Love)"
4. "Mirror Man"
5. "Louise"
6. "The Snake"
7. "Heart like a Wheel"
8. "Darkness"
9. "All I Ever Wanted"
10. "Open Your Heart"
11. "The Lebanon"
12. "One Man in My Heart"
13. "Human"
14. "Things That Dreams Are Made Of"
15. "Love Me Madly?"
16. "(Keep Feeling) Fascination"
17. "Tell Me When"
18. "Don't You Want Me"
19. "Empire State Human"
20. "Together In Electric Dreams"
21. "The Sound of the Crowd"

=== Extras ===
- Interview by 'Jet' Martin Celmins (55:11)
- Access All Areas (19:23)
- Gallery (35 photos from 19 DEC 03 Brighton)
- Biography (5 pages written by 'Jet' Martin Celmins)
- Audio options (Option of selecting either 5.1 Surround or 2.0 Stereo)
