= Reproductions: Songs of The Human League =

2000 compilation album by various artists

Compilation album by Various Artists
- Released: 7 November 2000
- Length: 42:28
- Label: March Records
- Producer: Skippy McFadden

Reproductions is an album of cover versions of songs by the Human League, recorded by various artists. It was released on 7 November 2000 as a tribute to the Human League.

== Track listing ==
1. Stephin Merritt - "Get Carter" 00:29
2. The Aluminum Group - "Love Action (I Believe in Love)" 04:09
3. Optiganally Yours - "Empire State Human" 03:10
4. Barcelona - "Mirror Man" 03:47
5. Future Bible Heroes - "Don't You Want Me" 03:50
6. Ladytron - "Open Your Heart" 04:08
7. Baxendale - "(Keep Feeling) Fascination" 05:01
8. Superheroes - "The Sound of the Crowd" 03:21
9. Lali Puna - "Together in Electric Dreams" 04:32
10. The Hidden Variable - "The Black Hit of Space" 04:34
11. Momus - "I Am the Law" 04:13
12. Clicks - "Seconds" 04:57
13. hollAnd - "The Lebanon" 01:35
14. Stars - "Stay with Me Tonight" 05:39
15. Garlands - "Being Boiled" 03:01
16. The 6ths, Lloyd Cole and the Commotions - "Human" 03:19

== Reception ==
Professional ratings
Review scores
Source	Rating
AllMusic	4/5 stars

== See also ==
- Together in Electric Dreams (EP)
