= Love and Dancing =

Remix album by the Human League
- Released: 2 July 1982
- Recorded: 1981
- Genre: Dance-pop; synth-pop; dub; disco
- Length: 35:40
- Label: Virgin
- Producer: Martin Rushent; The Human League

The Human League chronology
Dare (1981)	Love and Dancing (1982)	Fascination! (1983)

Love and Dancing is a remix album by the English synth-pop band the Human League, released in July 1982 by Virgin Records. Issued under the band name "The League Unlimited Orchestra" as a nod to Barry White's disco-era Love Unlimited Orchestra, the album was principally the idea and work of producer Martin Rushent and contains dub-style, largely instrumental remixes of songs from the band's multi-platinum selling album Dare (1981), along with a version of the track "Hard Times", which had originally been the B-side of the single "Love Action (I Believe in Love)". Rushent was inspired by hip hop turntablist Grandmaster Flash and created Love and Dancing on a mixing board. He created vocal effects by cutting up portions of the Dare tape and manually splicing them together. In total, over 2,600 edits feature on the album.

Upon release, Love and Dancing was able to take advantage of the huge success of Dare and also work as a stopgap while the Human League worked on new material. The album received both mixed and positive reviews from music critics and was a commercial success, reached number three in the UK Albums Chart and later being certified Platinum by the BPI. Today, the album is regarded as among the earliest remix albums ever released and has proven influential. In 2002, both Dare and Love and Dancing were remastered and re-issued together in a single package, while a single CD release of the Love and Dancing remaster was released the following year.

== Background ==
Synth-pop band The Human League's third album Dare (1981), produced by Martin Rushent, reached number one on the UK Albums Chart, and has retrospectively been considered one of the era's defining albums, ranking in critics' lists of the greatest albums of the 1980s and sometimes of all time. Dare also found success in the United States, partly because of New York-based black radio stations airing music from the album. The record's synth bass and Linn Electronics drum machine beats paralleled the electro funk music that had gained popularity on New York stations like Kiss, where according to writer Simon Reynolds, "tracks were undergoing radical remixing and be montaged into seamless segues that lasted half an hour or more." Rushent was already aware of the potential of remixing, having embedded a "dub-like spaciousness" to Human League tracks in parts where the instrumentation drops out.

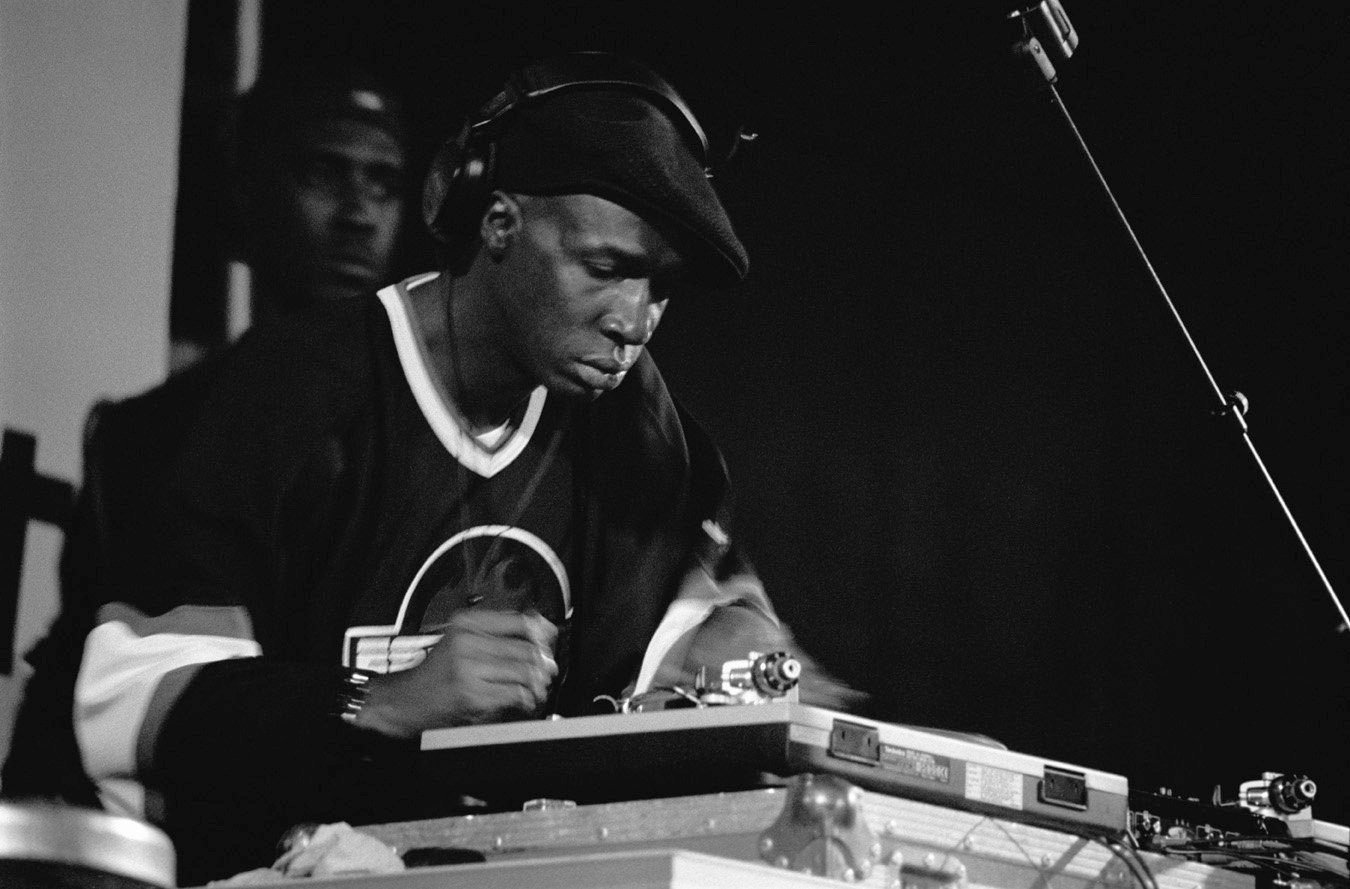
The tape scrubbing production of Love and Dancing was inspired by the scratching of Grandmaster Flash.

The producer had been listening to hip hop DJ Grandmaster Flash and played his music to front man Phil Oakey, who also enjoyed it. After seeing the DJ in New York, Rushent felt he could recreate his scratching style with tape scrubbing. With this in mind, he suggested creating a dub remix of the second single from Dare, "Love Action (I Believe in Love)", by chopping the song up and adding effects. This would allow Virgin Records to release it on the B-side of the single, as the label was eager to rush-release singles from Dare, leaving the Human League and Rushent without time to record new B-sides. Besides the "Love Action" remix, the producer ultimately created three or four other similar dub remixes to other songs from Dare. Further inspired by the music he would hear in clubs across New York, he ultimately proposed to the Human League that he create an instrumental remix album of Dare, hoping that it would exemplify his production skills and "establish a new benchmark for electronic dance pop."

Nonetheless, both the band and Virgin Records originally resisted the idea of the remix album, not wanting to pay for or release it. Rushent had to fight their opposition in order to create the album. Oakey remained unsure about the project and left Rushent to make the release on his own. Neil Mason of Louder Than War wrote that "Cruel", an instrumental version of "I Don't Depend on You" (a 1979 single released by The Human League under the alternative name The Men) that was released as that single's B-side, laid the formula that would ultimately lead to Love and Dancing.

Love and Dancing is sometimes viewed as a stopgap in the Human League's discography, released to keep the band in the public profile while the band recorded new material. Band member Jo Callis has disputed this, saying: "I think that was going to happen anyway. Soft Cell had done something similar around that time releasing a remixed album. Martin Rushent had this concept about remixing, taking a track apart and putting it back together. It was a new idea and concept and it seemed a good idea to everybody to try it out. So the concept of the Love and Dancing would have happened regardless."

== Production and composition ==
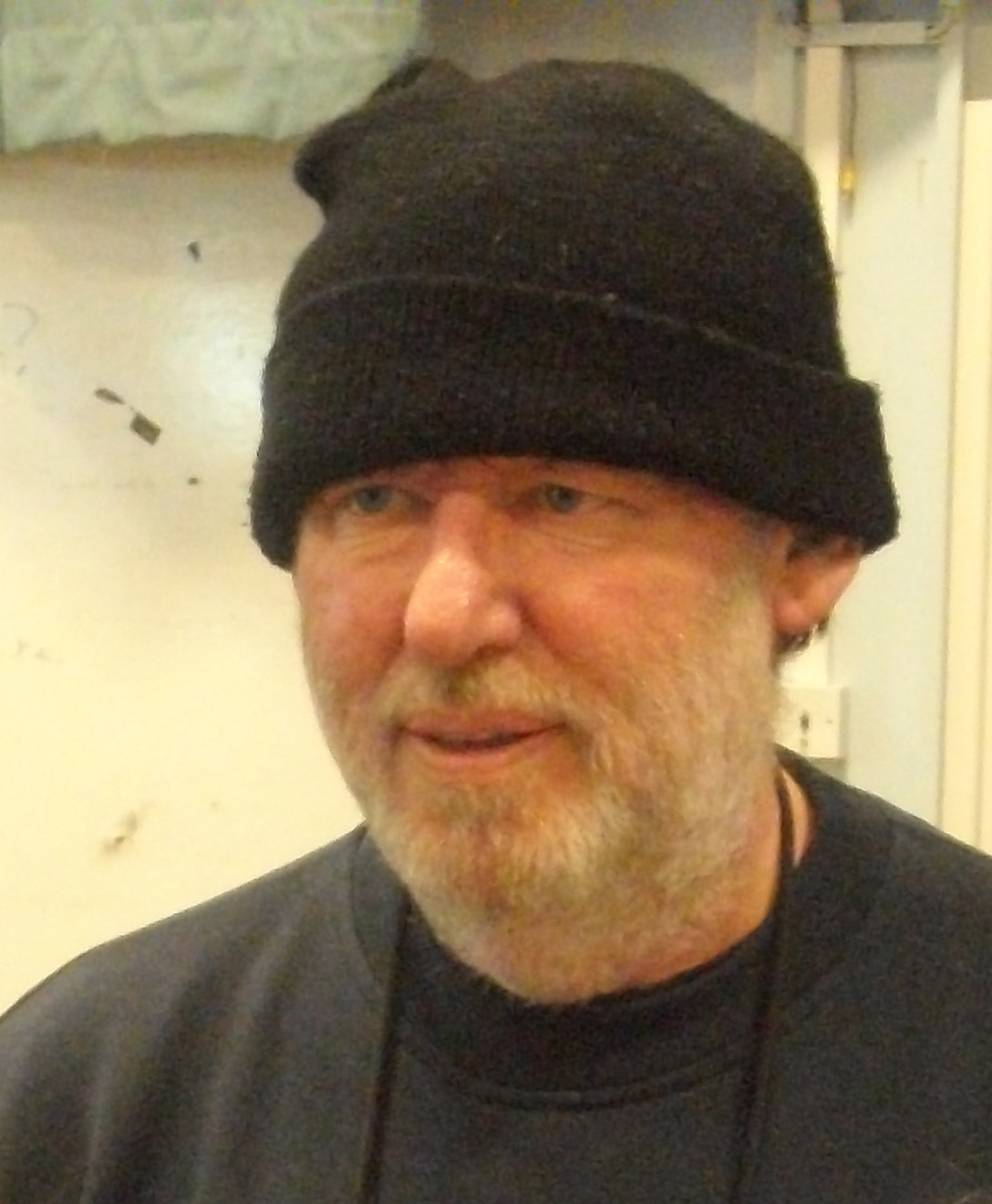
Martin Rushent (pictured 2011) produced Love and Dancing on a mixing board over ten days.

Reynolds writes that it "took thousands of man-hours of intensive sonic surgery" for Rushent to create Love and Dancing. The producer spent about ten days making the album, remixing the material on a mixing board with the multitrack recording of Dare being fed into the device. He also operated a Harmonizer on the first send and placed numerous phasers and delay lines that he would proceed to "flick about" into his set up. Rushent recalled: "I'd do a section and if I liked it I'd make a tape cut and splice it in." He created complex vocal effects by hand, cutting up small portions of tape and gluing them together until he had achieved "the stuttering 't-t-t-t' effect." When asked by Reynolds if he used samplers, he elaborated:

"No, no. There wasn't samplers then. I actually did it by cutting up tiny bits of tape. I made myself a special ruler which read out in milliseconds how long a piece of tape was. So I'd say, 'OK, this thing's at 120 beats per minute, so one beat is that long, a quarter of a beat is that long, and so I want to cut that little piece of tape by this length.' That would be the first bit of Phil going 't'. And then I got another copy of 't' and I glued them all together and got the stutter effect: 't-t-t-t'."

Dave Allen acted as Rushent's sound engineer during the sessions. His role was generally of a technical nature, and he later quipped: "Martin was/is a genius though, I was merely Sancho Panza." By the end of the remixing process, the master tape of Love and Dancing had 2,200 main edits and some 400 further, smaller edits for the stuttering repetition effects. This amount of splicing was so excessive – with an edit every half a second – that the master tape came very close to disintegrating. Rushent recalled: "You couldn't fast-forward it or fast-rewind it, so the first thing I did was copy the album on to another tape, before the original master fell apart."

Overall, Love and Dancing consists of Rushent's special dub remixes of eight tracks, seven of these from Dare and the other, "Hard Times", originally appearing as the B-side to the "Love Action" single. Brainwashed wrote that the album's "liberal use of echo and a complement of wacky sound effects and instrumental fills [are] immediately reminiscent of the early dub approach to remixing." Many of the tracks are at 120 beats per minute. Paul Morley of NME said that Rushent's production contains "plenty of moving parts, noises falling upwards, a way forward and backwards that is full of abrupt encounters – sudden interfaces, then emptiness." Music critics Daryl Easlea and Joel McIver of Record Collector described the album as being "full of stop-start beats, unpalatable noises and clunky, chunky deconstructions of [the Human League's] finest pop moments." Colin Irwin of Melody Maker described the album as "an instrumental soundscape."

== Release and reception ==
Professional ratings
Review scores
Source	Rating
AllMusic	2/5 stars
The Baltimore Sun	3.5/5 stars
Encyclopedia of Popular Music	3/5 stars
The Rolling Stone Album Guide	2.5/5 stars
Smash Hits	6/10

Upon the completion of Love and Dancing, the band decided to sell it at a relatively cheap price, believing the release to be "unfair to the fans." Band member Joanne Catherall nonetheless reflected that the group loved the album. The record was released in the United Kingdom by Virgin Records in July 1982, using the group name "The League Unlimited Orchestra" in tribute to Barry White's instrumental, disco-era backing band Love Unlimited Orchestra. The back cover of the album features individual photographs of the Human League, Rushent, his sound engineer Dave Allen, as well as sleeve designer Ken Ansell. Rushent recalled: "They had to have a picture of me. I did the whole thing on my own!" Rushent received no writing royalties on the album and in retrospect believed this to be unfair. The album title was the former name for the song "Do or Die".

The appearance of the album in July 1982 was a month after the release of Soft Cell's similarly styled remix album Non Stop Ecstatic Dancing, and these releases, alongside The B-52's' Party Mix!, were later described by Easlea and McIver as "the trilogy of early '80s pop-dance mix albums". By this point, Dare had created commercial momentum for Love and Dancing, which reached number three on the UK Albums Chart, and was certified Platinum by the British Phonographic Industry (BPI) on 1 November 1986 for sales of over 300,000 copies. The album was released in mid-price format by A&M Records in the United States several weeks later. Upon its American release, a couple of the tracks, including the "Don't You Want Me" remix, had already circulated on twelve-inch singles, whereas the other tracks were previously unreleased there and thus were embraced as "welcome bonuses", according to Brian Chin of Billboard.

In a contemporary review, Paul Morley of NME hailed Love and Dancing as an "exclamation mark" to the success of Dare, which he felt was "one of the great popular music LPs," and described its artful style as "the sound of 'love in fairyland' being launched into wonderland." Ian Birch in Smash Hits called the album an "odd item" and wrote: "Is it a stopgap measure or a fearlessly new way of presenting old tracks? It's neither really. Instead, the new window dressing produces some jaunty and occasionally jolting electronic effects. Ideal for watching Ceefax to." Among retrospective reviews, William Ruhlmann of AllMusic wrote that "if you always thought 'Don't You Want Me' was a great track with obnoxious vocals, this is the album for you." Ira Robbins of Trouser Press said that "[s]ome of the record bears listening to; other parts, however, are either repetitively dull or noisily annoying." In The New Rolling Stone Album Guide, the album is referred to as "an amusing trifle" and "a prelude of sorts" to the band's subsequent EP Fascination! (1983). Reviewing the 2002 re-release for Record Collector, Daryl Easlea and Joel McIver wrote that "Love and Dancing sounds pretty much as you'd expect, and only dated in the way that Giorgio Moroder's productions with Donna Summer sound. Thankfully recorded before the Fairlight sampler had fully taken hold, it sounds like the last post in the '80s for real, organic synthesiser music, if there could ever be such a thing. It's great fun."

== Legacy ==
Love and Dancing was one of the first remix albums ever released, and established the Human League as pioneers of the format, with Jon Falcone of MusicOMH calling the album "revolutionary" for its production. Tom Flint of Sound on Sound felt the album was "arguably even more influential than Dare itself," while NME wrote that both Dare and Love and Dancing "redefined modern synthetic pop." In his book Rip It Up and Start Again, Simon Reynolds hailed Love and Dancing "[a] masterpiece of editing and mixing-board wizardry." Tim Thornton of The Huffington Post cites the album as "one of the few examples of a whole album [...] being remixed by one person and then released as another album." In 2012, Fact included the record in a list of 20 landmark remix albums, describing it as "[t]he daddy of pop remix albums." In an interview, Sean Dickson of The Soup Dragons spoke of his infatuation for "the deconstruction concept of remix albums," including that of Love and Dancing, while Pet Shop Boys cited Love and Dancing as the inspiration for the etc. bonus CD in the double-disc edition of their album Yes (2009). Holly Johnson, formerly of Frankie Goes to Hollywood, recalled Love and Dancing being "incredible to dance to in seedy gay nightclubs."

"Making Love and Dancing was the most creative experience I've ever had in my life. Something that has been difficult to top. I haven't gone anywhere near it since. That's probably why I gave up record production for so long. It's like why astronauts go a bit loopy after they've got back from the moon. You've walked on the fucking moon, what are you gonna do now?"

—Martin Rushent, 2005

Phil Oakey said in a 1983 NME interview with Morley that, as long as the Human League can release albums as good as Love and Dancing, "then we deserve to be heard in five years' time and we don't deserve to be dropped like, say, Adam Ant's been dropped." He later hailed the album as "so innovative" in an interview with The Quietus, saying: "Martin was splicing in empty tape so the music would jerk, and no one had done stuff like this before. The guys mastering the album were saying, ‘You can't do this.’ It was that original." Oakey and Rushent both considered Love and Dancing to be better than Dare, the latter believing it to break the mould and ignite "the whole of the modern dance scene," commenting: "There isn't one effect or trick that you hear in any gene of modern dance music that you won't find on Love and Dancing. Like the stuttering vocals. That's the first record you'll find it on." He cited creating Love and Dancing as the most creative experience he had ever had, but also found it hard to follow up from, and took a lengthy hiatus from music production.

Virgin Records released Love and Dancing on CD in 1984 and a remastered CD edition on 6 January 2003. Dare/Love and Dancing, containing remastered versions of the two albums in the same package, was released by Virgin Records in the UK on 21 October 2002 and by Caroline Records in the US on 28 January 2003. Billboard magazine described Dare/Love and Dancing as a "Vital Reissue". In the early 2010s, Rushent began creating an updated version of Love and Dancing using live instrumentation, but the project went unfinished due to his death in 2011. His son, producer Tim Rushent, said of the incomplete project: "He hated to repeat himself and was always looking to move productions forwards and challenge himself. There are some recordings, but they're not what he settled on. The plan is for the first, last and only time, one take, Love And Dancing Live. It's all mapped out, it's all dad's work. And dad being dad, it's not as straightforward as it sounds. All we have to do is see that his final production happens."

== Track listing ==
=== Side one ===
1. "Hard Times" (Jo Callis, Philip Oakey, Philip Adrian Wright) – 5:40
2. "Love Action (I Believe in Love)" (Ian Burden, Oakey) – 5:12
3. "Don't You Want Me" (Callis, Oakey, Wright) – 7:18

=== Side two ===
4. "Things That Dreams Are Made Of" (Oakey, Wright) – 5:10
5. "Do or Die" (Burden, Oakey) – 4:36
6. "Seconds" (Callis, Oakey, Wright) – 2:25
7. "Open Your Heart" (Callis, Oakey) – 2:35
8. "The Sound of the Crowd" (Burden, Oakey) – 2:55

== Personnel ==
- Martin Rushent – producer, mixer
- Simon Fowler – photography

== Charts ==
=== Weekly charts ===
Weekly chart performance for Love and Dancing
Chart (1982)	Peak position
Australian Albums (Kent Music Report)	42
Finnish Albums (Suomen virallinen lista)	22
New Zealand Albums (RMNZ)	20
Swedish Albums (Sverigetopplistan)	35
UK Albums (OCC)	3
US Billboard 200	135

=== Year-end charts ===
Year-end chart performance for Love and Dancing
Chart (1982)	Position
UK Albums (OCC)	24

== Certifications ==
Certifications for Love and Dancing
Region	Certification	Certified units/sales
United Kingdom (BPI)	Platinum	300,000^{^}
^{^} Shipments figures based on certification alone.
