= Original Remixes & Rarities =

Compilation album by The Human League
- Released: 18 November 2005
- Recorded: 1979–2005
- Genre: Synthpop
- Length: 75:12
- Language: English
- Label: EMI; 094633827820
- Producer: Philip Oakey
- Compiler: Jason Day

The Human League chronology
Live at the Dome (2005)	Original Remixes & Rarities (2005)

Original Remixes & Rarities is a compilation album by the English synthpop band The Human League. It consists most of extended mixes and B Sides that did not appear on rereleases of the band's albums or on compilations. It was released in the UK and US in November 2005 by EMI. The cover art is a minimalist and horizontally flipped version of the cover for the group's 2001 album, Secrets.

== Track listing ==
1. "Being Boiled" (Album Version) – 4:16
2. "The Sound of the Crowd" (12" Version) (Complete) – 6:31
3. "Hard Times" (Love Action b-side) – 4:55
4. "Non-stop" (Open Your Heart b-side) – 4:19
5. "Don't You Want Me" (Special Extended Dance Mix) – 7:29
6. "Mirror Man" (Extended Version) – 4:22
7. "You Remind Me of Gold" (Mirror Man b-side) – 3:38
8. "(Keep Feeling) Fascination" (Improvisation) – 6:10
9. "Total Panic" (Fascination b-side) – 3:30
10. "The Lebanon" (12" Extended) – 5:54
11. "Life on Your Own" (Extended) – 5:48
12. "Together in Electric Dreams" (Extended) – 6:23
13. "Human" (Extended Version) – 5:05
14. "Heart Like a Wheel" (Extended Mix) – 6:50
