= Boys and Girls (The Human League song) =

Single by The Human League
- B-side: "Tom Baker"
- Released: 20 February 1981
- Recorded: Monumental Studios, Sheffield, England
- Genre: Synth-pop; new wave; dark wave
- Length: 3:14
- Label: Virgin
- Songwriters: Philip Oakey, Philip Adrian Wright

The Human League singles chronology
"Only After Dark" (1980)	"Boys and Girls" (1981)	"The Sound of the Crowd" (1981)

"Boys and Girls" is a song by the English synth-pop band The Human League. It was released as a stand-alone single in the UK in February 1981 and peaked at number 48 in the UK Singles Charts. It was written by lead singer Philip Oakey and the band's visual director / keyboard player Philip Adrian Wright.

It was the first single released by the new Human League line-up of Oakey, Wright together with new teenage dancers Susanne Sulley (now called Susan Ann Sulley) and Joanne Catherall, although the latter two did not perform on the record and only appear on the picture sleeve. The new line-up formed after the acrimonious departure of Martyn Ware and Ian Craig Marsh from the band four months earlier.

== Background ==
By late 1980 Oakey was deeply in debt to Virgin Records so both he and the label were keen that he release a single to start clearing that debt as early in 1981 as possible.

"Boys and Girls" was a song that had been used on the November 1980 European tour. On return from the tour it was recorded quickly and rushed out by Virgin Records in late February 1981.

== Release ==
The single was initially issued in a gatefold picture sleeve although contained a single 7" disc only with the instrumental track "Tom Baker" as the B-side. After a limited gatefold run it was released in a regular picture sleeve. At the time it was remarked on that Sulley and Catherall were missing from the song, after the mythology that had been started in the media about their recent recruitment to the band from the Crazy Daisy Nightclub four months earlier. This was because they had both returned to school full-time and "Boys and Girls" was originally written without any female vocals, although both Sulley and Catherall do feature on the record sleeve artwork and publicity material. Reviewing the single in the NME, Stuart Maconie remarked:

"Boys and Girls" is a cold, scary, uncomfortable effort with church bells, an operatic chorus, and, er, minimal contribution by 'Those Girls' (i.e. none) ..."

Reviewing the single for Smash Hits, critic David Hepworth stated "Sometimes I wonder whether these boys (and nowadays girls) seriously crave a hit or not" and invited the band to "Shape up"

== Legacy ==
With the benefit of hindsight critics now state that 'Boys and Girls' belongs to the earlier pre split Mk 1 Human League experimental electronic sound of Travelogue. It would be the last time that style was produced by the band as they evolved towards the Dare album sound within months.
Both "Boys and Girls" and the B side "Tom Baker" were included on all remastered CD reissues of the Travelogue album.
Although the song was never included on any of the group's hit singles compilation albums, it did feature on the career-spanning "A Very British Synthesiser Group" anthology.

== Track listing ==
7" vinyl (Virgin VS395)

1. "Boys and Girls" – 3:12
2. "Tom Baker" – 3:58
