= Live at the Dome =

Live at the Dome may refer to:

- Live at the Dome (Glen Campbell video), 1991
- Live at the Dome (The Human League concert video), 2004
- Live at the Dome (The Human League album), 2005
