= The Sound of the Crowd =

"Sound of the Crowd"

Single by the Human League

from the album Dare
- B-side: "The Sound of the Crowd (Add Your Voice)", "Dancevision" (Canadian release only)
- Released: 24 April 1981
- Recorded: 1981
- Studio: Genetic Sound (Streatley, Berkshire)
- Genre: New wave; pop; electro-disco
- Length: 3:58
- Label: Virgin
- Songwriters: Philip Oakey; Ian Burden
- Producer: Martin Rushent

The Human League singles chronology
| "Boys and Girls" (1981) | "Sound of the Crowd" (1981) | "Love Action (I Believe in Love)" (1981) |

Official audio
- "The Sound of the Crowd" on YouTube

"The Sound of the Crowd" is a song by the English synth-pop band the Human League. It became the band's commercial breakthrough, reaching #12 on the UK singles chart in May 1981.

== Background ==
Written jointly by lead vocalist Philip Oakey and keyboardist Ian Burden, the song was recorded at Genetic Sound Studios in Streatley, Berkshire, in March 1981. Originally released as a stand-alone single in April 1981, it was subsequently remixed and incorporated into the studio album Dare, later in the year.

"The Sound of the Crowd" was the first Human League song to feature female vocals, from new band members Susan Ann Sulley and Joanne Catherall, interacting with Philip Oakey's lead.

Apart from the catchy imperatives such as "Get in line now!" and "Get around town!", the song contains some more obscure lyrics such as "Make a shroud pulling combs through a backwash frame" and "Stroke a pocket with a print of a laughing sound". Discussing the song in a 2009 interview Ian Burden said:

On "The Sound of the Crowd" I scribbled down some stream-of-consciousness words so that I could demonstrate the vocal parts to him (Oakey) without having to do the naff la-la-la-hum-hum-hum type of explanation. He went off and wrote a new chorus vocal, but surprisingly kept my verse lyrics!?

== Release ==
The single was the first to feature a distinctive, though short-lived, marketing tactic, where Human League singles were labelled 'Red' or 'Blue' to help buyers differentiate between the band's musical styles. 'Red' was for dance tracks, 'Blue' for pop songs. "The Sound of the Crowd" was designated 'Red'. When asked to explain the system, vocalist Sulley explained that "Red is for posers, for Spandy (Spandau Ballet) types." Oakey added: "Blue is for ABBA fans."

The band first appeared on Top of the Pops (TOTP) to perform the song on 30 April 1981 when it was at no. 53 in the UK singles chart. The single entered the UK Top 40 a week later at no. 34 and after three weeks it reached its peak position of no. 12. A second Top of the Pops performance took place on 21 May 1981 when the single was at no. 15.

== B-side ==
The original 7" B-side "The Sound of the Crowd (Add Your Voice)" is an instrumental remix of the A-side, an edit of which was later used as the closing track of their remix album Love and Dancing, issued in 1982 under the name of the League Unlimited Orchestra. A longer instrumental version of "The Sound of the Crowd" featured as the B-side to the 12" release, with certain localisations including "Dancevision", from the Holiday '80 EP released the previous year.

== Versions ==
Although the song would later appear on the band's album Dare, a remix of the track was included.

The song in its original 7" mix appears on all The Human League's "Greatest Hits" compilation albums. The bonus remix disc issued with The Very Best of The Human League (2003) contains three different remixes created for the 2003 release: "The Sound of the Crowd (Trisco's PopClash Mix)" "The Sound of the Crowd (Freaksblamredo)" and "The Sound of the Crowd (Riton Re-Dub)".

The Original Remixes & Rarities compilation album issued in 2005 includes the Complete or 12" version.

The 2012 edition of "Dare/Fascination!" contains the album version, the Extended or Complete version and the Instrumental version as featured on the original 1981 12" single.

The song is sampled on Gorillaz's song "Ghost Train", the B-side of their 2001 single "Rock the House".

== Track listing ==
7" vinyl (Virgin VS416)

1. "The Sound of the Crowd" – 3:55
2. "The Sound of the Crowd (Add Your Voice)" – 3:01

12" vinyl (Virgin VS416-12)

1. "The Sound of the Crowd (Complete)" – 6:32
2. "The Sound of the Crowd (Instrumental)" – 4:11

12" vinyl EP (Canada only) (Virgin VEP 304)

1. "The Sound of the Crowd" – 6:25
2. "Tom Baker" – 4:02
3. "Boys and Girls" – 3:15
4. "Dancevision" – 2:22
5. "The Sound of the Crowd (Add Your Voice)" – 4:10
- Cassette (Virgin VEP4 304) has the same track listing.

== Promotional video ==
No promotional video was made for the song, although recordings of TV performances from Top of the Pops (30 April 1981) and Later... with Jools Holland (25 November 1995) are included on the bonus DVD issued with The Very Best of The Human League.

== Cover versions ==
Kelly Osbourne included a cover version of the song entitled "Sound of the Crowd" on her 2005 single "One Word".
