= Live at the Dome (The Human League album) =

Live album by The Human League
- Released: 18 July 2005
- Recorded: Brighton Dome, 19 December 2003
- Genre: Synthpop
- Length: 62:03
- Label: Secret Records; Snapper Music; SMACD904

The Human League compilation chronology
The Very Best of the Human League (2003)	Live at the Dome (2005)	Original Remixes & Rarities (2005)

The Human League Live at the Dome is a live album by British synthpop band The Human League recorded during a concert at the Brighton Dome, UK on 19 December 2003. It was released as an enhanced digipak CD in the UK on 18 July 2005 by Secret Records Limited (distributed by Snapper Music).

The album features singles and album tracks, spanning the years from their debut album release, 1979's Reproduction, to their most recent album, 2001's Secrets. Also included are three enhanced live video tracks.

A DVD also called Live at the Dome was released concurrently with the album, the DVD contains the full concert and bonus footage.

The cover artwork for both the album and DVD was by Stig Olsen.

The album was reissued on vinyl+DVD in 10 November 2017 with a new title, The Sound Of The Crowd - Greatest Hits In Concert, and a new cover. The vinyl featured a truncated list of ten songs. In 2024, the album was reissued as an expanded 2 CD+DVD combo. This remastered version included more songs than the original Live At The Dome release, adding "Heart Like A Wheel," "One Man In My Heart," "Love Me Madly," "Tell Me When," "Empire State Human," and "The Sound Of The Crowd".

== Track listing ==
1. "Medley Hard Times / Love Action (I Believe in Love)" - 8:21
2. "Mirror Man" - 4:27
3. "Louise" - 5:04
4. "The Snake" - 4:22
5. "Darkness" - 3:53
6. "All I Ever Wanted" - 4:03
7. "Open Your Heart" - 4:02
8. "The Lebanon" - 4:16
9. "Human" - 4:21
10. "The Things That Dreams Are Made Of" - 3:48
11. "(Keep Feeling) Fascination" - 4:01
12. "Don't You Want Me" - 3:59
13. "Together in Electric Dreams" - 4:48
14. "Mirror Man" (Enhanced Video) - 4:27
15. "Human" (Enhanced Video) - 4:21
16. "(Keep Feeling) Fascination" (Enhanced Video) - 4:01
