= The Human League =

English synth-pop band

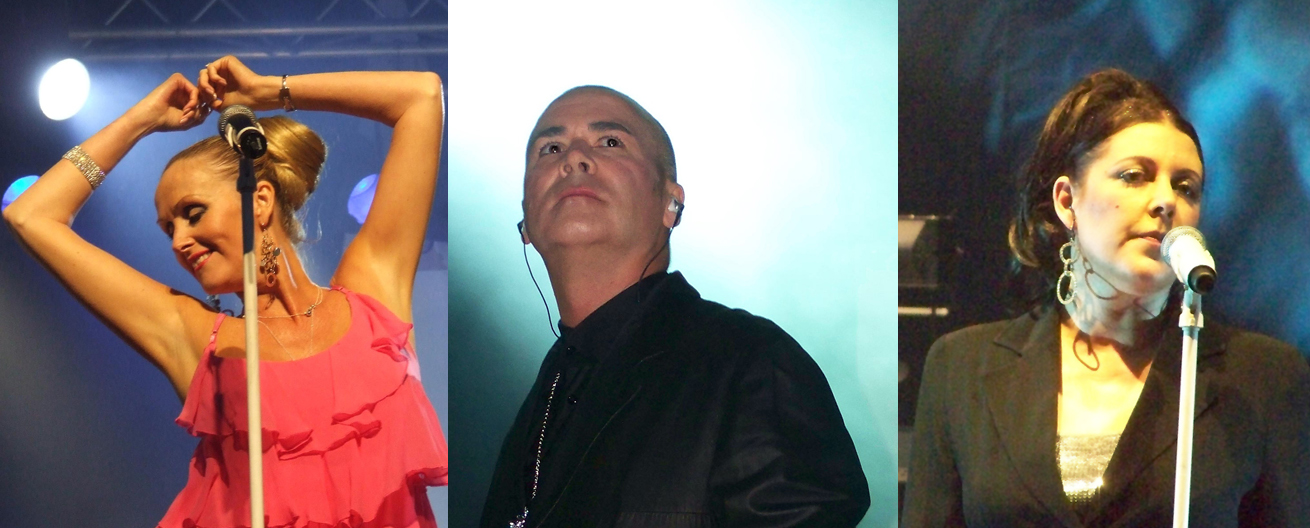
- Lineup: Susan Ann Sulley, Philip Oakey, Joanne Catherall

Background information
- Also known as: The Future (1977), the Men (1979), the League, the League Unlimited Orchestra (1982)
- Origin: Sheffield, South Yorkshire, England
- Genres: Synth-pop; new wave; electronic
- Works: Discography
- Years active: 1977–present
- Labels: Fast Product; Wall of Sound; Virgin; A&M; East West; Papillon
- Spinoffs: Heaven 17
- Members: Philip Oakey; Joanne Catherall; Susan Ann Sulley
- Past members: Ian Craig Marsh; Martyn Ware; Philip Adrian Wright; Ian Burden; Jo Callis; Jim Russell; Neil Sutton; Russell Dennett
- Website: thehumanleague.co.uk

The Human League are an English synth-pop band formed in Sheffield in 1977. Initially an experimental electronic outfit, the group signed to Virgin Records in 1979 and later attained widespread commercial success with their third album Dare in 1981 after restructuring their lineup. The album produced the hit singles "The Sound of the Crowd", "Love Action (I Believe in Love)", "Open Your Heart" and the UK and US number one "Don't You Want Me". The band received the Brit Award for Best British Breakthrough Act in 1982. Further hits followed throughout the 1980s and into the 1990s, including the non-album singles "Mirror Man" (1982) and "(Keep Feeling) Fascination" (1983), "The Lebanon" from the album Hysteria (1984), "Human" (a second US number one) from the album Crash (1986) and "Tell Me When" from the album Octopus (1995).

The only constant band member since 1977 has been lead singer Philip Oakey. The original lineup comprised Oakey, synthesizer players Ian Craig Marsh and Martyn Ware, and slide projectionist and visual director Adrian Wright. After releasing their second album Travelogue in 1980, both Marsh and Ware left the band to form Heaven 17. Oakey and Wright assembled a new lineup with singers Joanne Catherall and Susan Ann Sulley, bassist/synthesizer player Ian Burden, and guitarist/synthesizer player Jo Callis. Wright, Burden and Callis all left the band by the end of the 1980s, since which time the Human League has essentially been a trio of Oakey, Catherall and Sulley with various sidemen.

The Human League have had six top-20 albums and 13 top-20 singles in the UK and had sold more than 20 million records worldwide by 2010. As an early techno-pop act that received extensive MTV airplay, they are regarded as one of the leading artists of the 1980s Second British Invasion of the US.

== History ==
=== 1977–1980: Early years, Reproduction, and Travelogue ===
In early 1977, Ian Craig Marsh and Martyn Ware, who had met at youth arts project Meatwhistle, were both working as computer operators. Their musical collaboration combined pop music (such as glam rock and Tamla Motown) with avant-garde electronic music. With the price of electronic components dropping in the mid-1970s, equipment became more affordable for the average consumer; Marsh and Ware purchased a Korg 700S synthesizer together and learned how to play it. Their musical reputation spread, and they were invited to play at a friend's 21st birthday party. For the party, Marsh and Ware formed themselves into an informal band called The Dead Daughters. After a few more low-key, private performances, Marsh and Ware decided to officially form a band. Joined by their friend Adi Newton and another synthesizer (a Roland System-100), they formed The Future and began to create music in their own rehearsal facility in a disused cutlery workshop in the centre of Sheffield. The association with Adi Newton was short; Newton left The Future and went on to form Clock DVA. Ware at this point decided that they needed a singer rather than a third synthesizer player.

Marsh and Ware's first choice, Glenn Gregory, was unavailable (Gregory eventually became the lead singer of their later band Heaven 17). Ware then decided to invite an old school friend, Philip Oakey, to join the band. Oakey was working as a hospital porter at the time and was known on the Sheffield social scene for his eclectic style of dress. Although he had no musical experience, Ware thought he would be ideal as lead singer for The Future as "he already looked like a pop star". When Ware called on Oakey, he found he was out, so asked him to join The Future by leaving a note stuck to his front door. He accepted the invitation, but early sessions were awkward. Oakey had never sung in front of an audience before, could not play keyboards and only owned a saxophone (which he could barely play). Listening to one of Marsh and Ware's demos, Oakey was inspired to write some lyrics which later became the single "Being Boiled".

With a new line-up, sound, and vocalist, Ware decided that the band needed a new name. It would also allow them to approach record companies again from a different angle. Ware suggested "The Human League", after a group in the science-fiction board game StarForce: Alpha Centauri. In the game, the Human League arose in 2415 A.D. and was a frontier-oriented society that desired more independence from Earth. Oakey and Marsh agreed on the new name, and in early 1978 The Future became The Human League.

The original Human League in 1980. From left to right: Philip Oakey, Adrian Wright, Ian Craig Marsh, Martyn Ware.

Using Future-era material, The Human League released a demo tape to record companies under their new name. The tape contained versions of "Being Boiled", "Toyota City" and "Circus of Death". Ware's friend Paul Bower of Sheffield new-wave band "2.3", who had just recorded a single for Bob Last's Edinburgh-based independent label Fast Product, took their demo to Last and he signed the band.

The band released their first single, "Being Boiled", in June 1978, which became Fast Product's third release. Although a limited release—because it was unique and at odds with everything else on the market—it was picked up on by NME, who championed the band, although one guest reviewer, John Lydon of Public Image Limited, condemned the band as "trendy hippies". Boosted by critical praise, on 12 June 1978, the band played their first live gig together at Bar 2 in Sheffield's Psalter Lane Art College (latterly Sheffield Hallam University); a plaque commemorated the event until the Psalter Lane site officially closed on 31 August 2008.

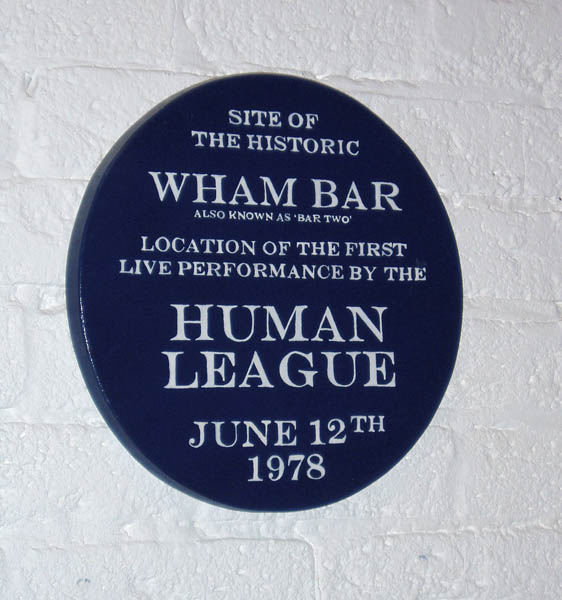
Plaque located in Sheffield Hallam University commemorating the Human League's first live concert

With their reliance on technology and tape machines, the band had been nervous about playing live. After the Psalter Lane performance, they worried that they had appeared static and uninspiring. A friend of Oakey's who had been in the audience, Philip Adrian Wright, who also had an art and photography background, was invited to become the band's Director of Visuals, with a remit to "liven up" the stage performance with slides, film clips and lighting.

In August 1978, the band recorded a session for John Peel, including a re-worked version of "Being Boiled". The band's live performances began to gain momentum and acclaim, and they were asked to support first The Rezillos (featuring future band member Jo Callis), then Siouxsie and the Banshees, as early as September 1978. In December 1978, David Bowie appeared in the audience and later declared to NME that he "had seen the future of pop music".

Following the "Being Boiled" single, The Human League's second and last release on the Fast Product label was The Dignity of Labour EP, issued in April 1979, which contained four experimental instrumentals. Although the EP barely charted, major record labels began approaching the band in an attempt to lure them away from Fast. In May 1979, the band accepted an offer by Richard Branson's Virgin Records. Because of his label's early support, the band offered Bob Last the position as band manager. In June 1979, The Human League supported Iggy Pop on his European tour, before settling into recording their first single for Virgin. Despite promising them creative freedom, Virgin demanded sweeping changes to the band's style for their first single, in order to make it more commercial. The label required the band to use conventional instruments and vocals as well as synthesizers. Because the League had accepted a large financial signing advance, Ware was in no position to refuse but insisted that any releases in this style be credited to a pseudonym. The resulting single, their first under Virgin Records, was the disco influenced "I Don't Depend on You", released in July 1979 under the pseudonym "The Men". The single did not chart and had very little in common with the previous work of the Human League. It did, however, feature female vocals by guests Lisa (Liza) Strike and Katie Kissoon, sounding like the yet-to-be-formed future Human League of 1981.

Because the imposed style had not worked, Virgin permitted the band to return to their original style. The Human League's full studio album Reproduction was released in August 1979. The album and the single "Empire State Human" failed to make an impact on the charts. After these flops, Virgin cancelled the band's December 1979 tour. By this time, The Human League's role as UK electronic pioneers was usurped by Gary Numan, when his single "Are 'Friends' Electric?" became a huge hit in the UK in mid-1979. In March 1980, the band—which had not yet hit the singles charts—was namechecked in a UK hit song by The Undertones. The track "My Perfect Cousin", which would peak at #9 on the UK charts in May, contained a dig at the perceived "arty" Human League in the lyric:

"His mother bought him a synthesiser / Got the Human League in to advise her / Now he's making lots of noise / Playing along with the art school boys"

In April 1980, the band was able to release an EP entitled Holiday '80, containing the principal track "Marianne", covers of Gary Glitter's "Rock and Roll Part 2" and Iggy Pop's "Nightclubbing", a re-recording of "Being Boiled", and the 1977 Future recording "Dancevision". Holiday '80 did well enough to get the band their first TV appearance on BBC TV's Top of the Pops on 8 May 1980 opening a Peter Powell presented show with "Rock and Roll Part 2". This was to be the second and last high-profile appearance by the original Human League on British television, the first having been BBC2's Mainstream programme in late 1979, organised and presented by the artist Brian Clarke, an early supporter of the band. A performance in the studio, complete with slideshow, was broadcast of the tracks "The Path of Least Resistance" and the then-current minor hit "Empire State Human".

In May 1980, the band toured the UK. Adrian Wright was now playing incidental keyboards in addition to his visuals role. The Human League featured a cover version of Judas Priest's heavy metal anthem "Take On the World (Judas Priest song)" on their 1980 tour. It was the last time all four members performed together live. Also in May, the band released their second studio album Travelogue. More commercial-sounding than Reproduction, it peaked at #16 in the UK, giving the band their first real success. As a result, "Empire State Human" was re-released, though it only reached #62 in the singles chart.

Equipment used in this period were: Roland Jupiter 4, Korg 770, Roland System 100 consisting of 1 × 101 keyboard, 2 × 102 expanders, 2 × 104 sequencers and 103 mixer, plus taped backing for rhythm and drum parts.

=== 1980–1989: Lineup changes, commercial success, Dare, Hysteria, and Crash ===
The Human League in 1984. From left to right: Joanne Catherall, Jo Callis, Wright, Oakey, Susan Ann Sulley, Ian Burden.

The relationship between Oakey and Ware had always been turbulent, and the pair often quarrelled over creative and personal matters. Their lack of success compared with the success of Gary Numan at that time had brought matters to a head. Ware insisted the band maintain their pure electronic sound, while Oakey wanted to emulate the more conventional sound of more successful pop groups. The two clashed continually and Ware eventually walked out in 1980. Taking Ware's side, Marsh joined him in quitting the band. Manager Bob Last tried to reconcile both parties, and when that proved impossible, various options were suggested, including two new bands under a Human League sub-label. Eventually, it was agreed that Oakey and Wright would continue with the Human League name, while Marsh and Ware would form a completely new band, which became Heaven 17 with singer Glenn Gregory, who had been their first choice for Human League singer back in 1977.

Retaining the Human League name came at a heavy price for Oakey, being responsible for all Human League debts and commitments. Furthermore, the terms of the Virgin contract required him to pay Marsh and Ware one per cent of royalties of the next Human League album. The split also jeopardized the band's upcoming tour, with the first performance only ten days away and the music media reporting that The Human League was finished now that "the talented people had left". To save the tour, Oakey had to recruit new people in a matter of days. Wright agreed to increase his playing of synthesizers, while Oakey initially intended to hire a female backing vocalist to cover Ware's high-pitched backing vocals. In a frequently repeated anecdote, Oakey and his then girlfriend went into Sheffield city centre one Wednesday night and visited various venues with the hope of finding a female singer to join the band. They eventually came to the Crazy Daisy Nightclub on High Street, where Oakey spotted two girls dancing together on the dance floor, Joanne Catherall and Susan Ann Sulley. They were both 17-year-old students on a night out and neither had any experience singing or dancing professionally. With no preamble, Oakey asked both girls to join the tour as dancers and incidental vocalists. Oakey has stated that upon discovering the girls were only teenagers and also best friends, he invited them both so they could look after each other on the tour. He has also said that he thought having two women as vocalists and dancers would also add glamour to the band. Because of the girls' ages, Oakey and Wright later had to visit Catherall and Sulley's respective parents to obtain permission for the girls to go on the tour. Their parents let them join the band under the provision that Oakey would keep them safe. Sulley also reported that both her father and Catherall's went to the girls' school and convinced them that the experience of touring could be educational because of the travelling involved. In addition to Catherall and Sully, Ian Burden from Sheffield synth band Graph was also recruited.

The tour was completed as advertised with the first date at Doncaster Top Rank. However, the music press was scornful of what they deemed "Oakey and his dancing girls". On completion of the tour, Burden went on to his next commitment playing bass guitar in West Berlin. Because of the professionalism they had shown and because Oakey planned to use them further vocally, he and manager Bob Last made Catherall and Sulley full members of the band, to be paid on a salary basis.

In January 1981, although they had survived the tour, the band was still in trouble. Heavily in debt to Virgin Records, Oakey and Wright were under pressure to produce results quickly. By February 1981 the band recorded and rushed out "Boys and Girls". Catherall and Sulley (who had returned to their sixth-form full-time) were not involved in the recording but were included on the single's front cover. The single reached #47 in the UK charts, the band's highest singles chart position to that point. Oakey acknowledged that he needed to bring in professional musicians, and so Ian Burden was tracked down and invited to join the band full-time.

Virgin's faith had been restored by "Boys and Girls", but they believed the band lacked professional production. In March, Oakey was introduced to veteran producer Martin Rushent. Rushent's first move was to dispatch the entire band to his Genetic Studios in Reading, Berkshire, away from the "unhealthy atmosphere" of Monumental Studios, Sheffield, that they shared with Heaven 17. The first result of the Genetic sessions was the single "The Sound of the Crowd". The single became their first Top 40 hit, reaching #12 in the UK. Bob Last believed that the band could be improved further by the addition of one more professional musician, so in April 1981, his associate Jo Callis (formerly of The Rezillos whom Last had previously managed) was invited to become the sixth official member of the band. The next single, "Love Action (I Believe in Love)", reached #3 in the UK in August 1981. The band set about arranging their existing material and demos into a viable album, produced by Rushent. Catherall and Sulley, who had just left school, immediately postponed their plans to attend university to work on the album.

By this time, the band's commercial success and higher profile had caused their first two albums to start selling again. Reproduction charted for the first time in August 1981, eventually peaking at #34, and Travelogue also recharted and returned to the Top 30 for several weeks. Both albums eventually achieved Gold status. In October 1981, Virgin released a brand new single, "Open Your Heart", which gave the band another Top 10 hit. The band's new album, Dare, was also released in October 1981 and reached #1 in the UK. It spent a total of four weeks at the top spot over the 1981–1982 period, remaining in the chart for 77 weeks and eventually going triple platinum.

Because of Dare's success, Virgin executive Simon Draper instructed that a fourth single be released from the album before the end of 1981. His choice was to be "Don't You Want Me", a track Oakey considered to be a filler and the weakest track on the album. Oakey fought the decision, believing it would damage the band, but was overruled by Draper, and "Don't You Want Me" was released in November 1981. Aided by an expensive music video (a rarity at the time) directed by film maker Steve Barron, the single went to #1 for five weeks over the 1981 Christmas period. In a 1995 interview with music journalist James Richliano, Oakey credited MTV for helping the song reach the top of the charts: "I don't think we would have had a number one if it weren't for the video and MTV. Trying to interpret songs with video is a real problem, but at the same time, we know that we wouldn't be here without video."

"Don't You Want Me" became the band's biggest hit, selling almost 1.5 million copies in the UK. Dare has since been labelled as one of pop music's most influential albums. In a retrospective review of the album, Stephen Thomas Erlewine, senior editor for AllMusic, gave Dare a five-star rating. He wrote: "The technology may have dated, synths and drum machines may have become more advanced, but few have manipulated technology in such an emotionally effective way." Although the group has been retrospectively identified with the New Romantic movement of this period, according to Dave Rimmer, author of New Romantics: The Look, "at the time [they] were no such thing." The band themselves have also consistently and strenuously rejected the label. The Sheffield scene in which The Human League formed predated New Romanticism and took more influence from Kraftwerk. Bands in the Sheffield scene were also referred to as Futurists, although Oakey himself has said: "We thought we were the punkiest band in Sheffield."

Capitalising on the success of the album and their recent #1 hit single, "Being Boiled" was re-released and became a Top 10 hit in early 1982. The band toured for the first time together internationally. Concurrently, Dare (later renamed Dare!) was released in the US by A&M Records and "Don't You Want Me" also reached #1 there in the summer of 1982. A remix album of Dare entitled Love and Dancing was released under the group name "The League Unlimited Orchestra" (a tribute to Barry White's Love Unlimited Orchestra), reaching #3 on the UK album chart. In 1982, the band received the Best British Newcomer award at the annual Brit Music awards, and Rushent also took Best Producer for his work on Dare. In February 1983, the band was nominated for the Best New Artist award at the 25th Annual Grammy Awards (though the award eventually went to Men at Work).

In November 1982, the Motown influenced electropop single "Mirror Man" reached #2 in the UK chart, just missing another Christmas #1, which was taken by "Save Your Love" by Renée and Renato. The follow-up single, "(Keep Feeling) Fascination", was released in April 1983, and peaked at #2 in the UK and #8 on the Billboard Charts in the USA. The following months proved to be difficult ones for the band as they struggled to record a follow-up album to Dare under immense pressure from Virgin. A six-song EP called Fascination!, composed of the singles "Mirror Man" and "Fascination" together with the new track "I Love You Too Much", was released in America as a stop-gap and also became a strong seller as an import in the UK.

In August 1983, the band released The Human League Video Single, promoted as "the UK's first videotape single", to capitalise on the growing home video market. Although "video albums" had been released by bands such as Blondie and ELO as early as 1979, this release was a short (12 mins) featuring just three tracks (the music videos for "Mirror Man", "Love Action (I Believe in Love)", and "Don't You Want Me"). Although it was not a commercial success (as it retailed for £10.99, compared to 12" vinyl singles averaging £1.99 in 1983), the format caught on and other artists began releasing video singles/EPs of their own.

The band spent many months agonising as they tried to make a successor to Dare, and as things became ever more stressful, producer Martin Rushent left the project. At this point, the band ditched much of the material recorded so far and started over again with new producers Hugh Padgham and Chris Thomas (though some of Rushent's contributions to certain tracks from the earlier sessions were included on the released album). Finally in May 1984, the band released the single "The Lebanon" about the Lebanese Civil War. The single peaked at #11 in the UK. This was followed shortly thereafter by the album Hysteria, so called because of the difficult and tense recording process. It entered the UK album chart at #3. The second single was "Life on Your Own" in mid-1984. The single peaked at #16.

Later that year, success outside of the Human League came for Oakey in the shape of the huge hit single "Together in Electric Dreams", a collaboration with one of his idols, synth pioneer Giorgio Moroder. The track was taken from the film soundtrack to Electric Dreams and became a massive hit. Often now erroneously credited as a Human League single, due to its success and enduring popularity, the band have since adopted it for their live performances and it appears on their greatest hits compilations. Oakey and Moroder then recorded an album together for Virgin, Philip Oakey & Giorgio Moroder, but this met with rather less success and the following two singles failed to make the UK Top 40. However, the success of the original Oakey and Moroder track encouraged Virgin to release one final single from Hysteria in November 1984; the ballad "Louise" was released and reached #13 in the UK.

After Hysteria, the group found themselves in creative stagnation, struggling to record material to follow up on their previous successes. Key songwriter Jo Callis departed, while Bob Last quit as manager and was not replaced. Drummer Jim Russell joined the band, after working with them semi-regularly during the Hysteria period. In 1985, the band spent several months working on a new album with producer Colin Thurston (who had produced "I Don't Depend on You", Reproduction, and the first two Duran Duran albums), but yet more clashes in the recording studio ensued and the project was shelved in September 1985. Worried by the lack of progress with one of their most profitable acts, Virgin paired the Human League up with American R&B producers Jimmy Jam and Terry Lewis, who had a proven track record with Janet Jackson, the SOS Band, Alexander O'Neal, and Cherelle. Jam and Lewis had expressed an interest in working with the band after hearing their US releases. Virgin flew the entire band to Minneapolis. The four-month-long recording sessions were beset with creative disputes, with Jam and Lewis having preconceived ideas on how they wanted the album to sound, rejecting most of the band's material (which would cost the band considerable loss of royalty income).

The final result of the sessions was the Crash album. The album featured much material written by the Jam and Lewis team, and showcased their Yamaha DX7-led sound. It produced a US #1 single, "Human" (#8 in the UK), but other singles performed relatively poorly. The album, while making the Top 10 in the UK, was not as popular as previous releases. Disheartened by being sidelined in Minneapolis and with the direction the band had taken, Adrian Wright left The Human League to work in film. The band spent late 1986 and early 1987 on a world tour to capitalise on their high-profile at this time. After the tour, Ian Burden and Jim Russell both left the band, while keyboardist Neil Sutton and guitarist Russell Dennett, who had both been part of the 1986/87 touring band, joined full-time. In November 1988, a Greatest Hits album was released that reached #3 in UK. "Love Is All That Matters" from Crash was issued as a single to promote the collection.

In 1989, the band built their own studio in Sheffield, jointly funded by Oakey and a business development loan from Sheffield City Council.

=== 1990–1999: Romantic? and Octopus ===
In 1990, Oakey, Catherall, Sulley, Sutton and Dennett released what would ultimately be the last Human League album for Virgin Records, Romantic?. Jo Callis returned to play on some of the sessions and co-wrote two songs, including the minor hit single "Heart Like a Wheel". At odds with the prevailing trend of US grunge and the Manchester scene, the Romantic? album did not re-capture the group's huge commercial success of the 1980s, with its second single "Soundtrack to a Generation" barely charting. In 1992, Virgin abruptly cancelled their recording contract. Damaged by the failure of the album, their rejection by Virgin, harsh criticism in the media and facing financial ruin, the emotional well-being of Oakey and Sulley deteriorated badly.

After a couple of years, the band had recovered enough confidence to put out demos to other record labels. Concurrently in 1993, they were invited to work with veteran Japanese electropop band Yellow Magic Orchestra (YMO), which resulted in the EP "YMO Versus The Human League". Released principally in Japan and Asia in April 1993, the EP includes cover versions of the YMO songs "Behind the Mask" and "Kimi Ni Mune Kyun" ("I Love You"), featuring the vocals of Catherall and Sulley.

In 1994, EastWest Records (a subsidiary of Time Warner) showed interest in the band's demos and the material rejected by Virgin. They signed the band and paired them with producer Ian Stanley (formerly of Tears for Fears). EastWest financed expensive music videos and heavily promoted their releases. The first release was on Boxing Day 1994 and was the single "Tell Me When", which gave the band their first Top 10 hit since 1986's "Human". It also topped the UK airplay charts for several weeks. The accompanying album, Octopus, returned the band to the UK Top 10 and later achieved a gold disc. As with the previous album, former member Jo Callis contributed as a songwriter. The second single from the album was the ballad "One Man in My Heart", which features Sulley on lead vocals. It reached #13 in the UK and was unique in that it was the only single by the Human League to feature a female only lead vocal until "Never Let Me Go" in 2011. A third and final single "Filling Up with Heaven" also reached the UK Top 40. An updated Greatest Hits album appeared in late 1995, featuring a new single "Stay with Me Tonight", another UK Top 40, and a new remix of "Don't You Want Me". Russell Dennett left the band at the end of the year.

1998 saw a change in management at EastWest, which brought the cancellation of the band's contract once again. Afterward, the band co-headlined with Culture Club and Howard Jones on VH1's 1980s "Big Rewind" nostalgia tour and made other concert and public appearances throughout 1997–2000.

=== 2000–2009: Secrets and increased touring ===
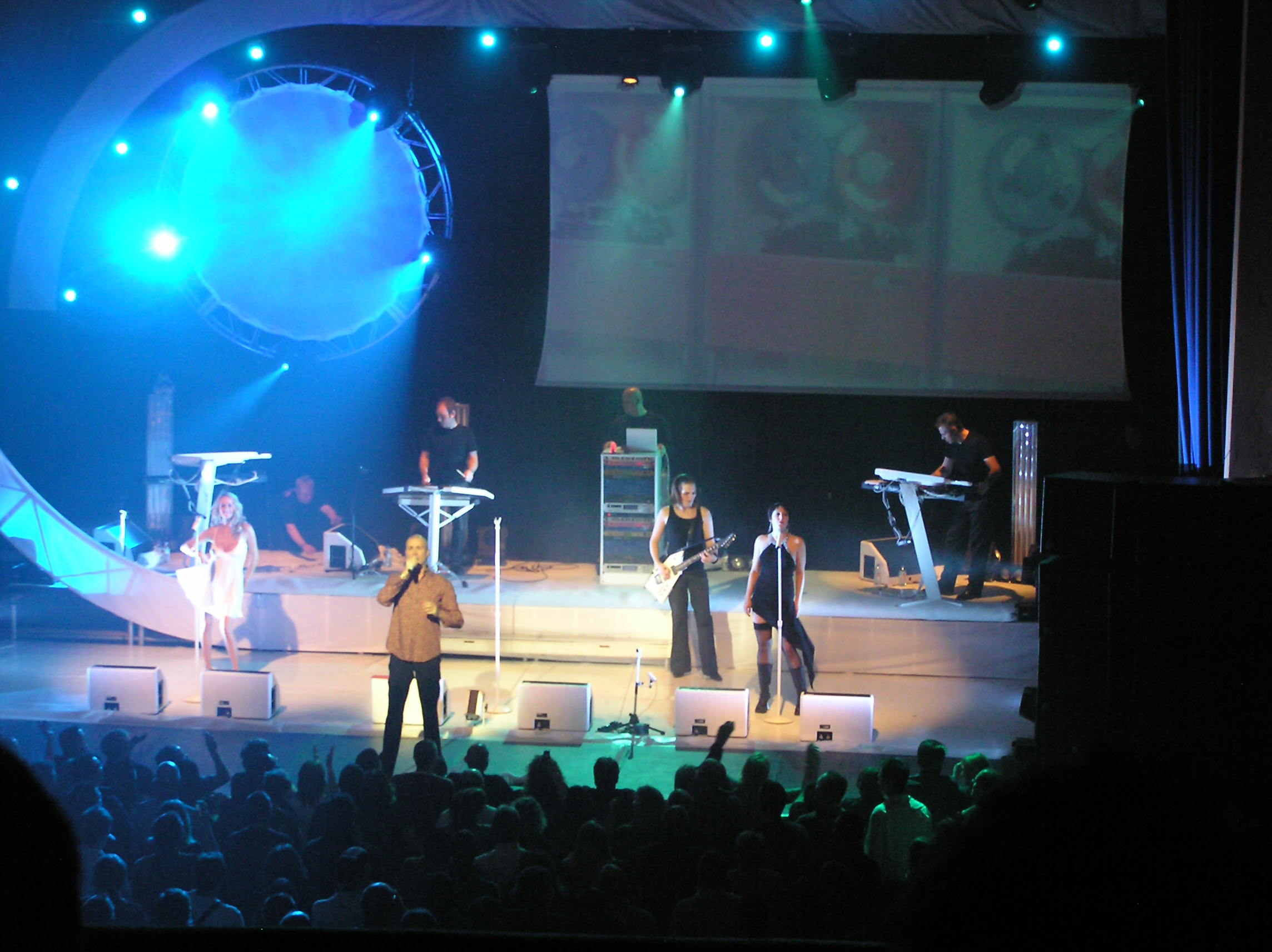
Synth City Tour 2005

In May 2000, the band signed to Papillon Records, a subsidiary of the Chrysalis Group, and began recording tracks for their new album due out the following year. The album, titled Secrets, was released August 2001, and received generally favourable reviews from critics. Commercially, the album flopped, entering the UK album chart at #44, falling off the chart the following week. This was not helped by the band's record label, Papillon, which developed financial problems. It was closed by the parent company shortly after the album's release, leading to poor promotion and sales. BBC Radio 1 also refused to playlist the single "All I Ever Wanted" because, now in their 40s, the band did not match the radio station's demographic target audience. Susan Sulley said that the rejection of Secrets was "the lowest the band had been since 1992" and, after putting in so much time and effort in to an album that then failed, nearly caused them to call it a day.

To accompany the then-stalled album, the band conducted the 2001 'Secrets Tour'. Long-time studio engineer David Beevers had become part of the on-stage line-up, controlling the sequencers from behind his deck of twin Apple Macs. Oakey further recruited multi-instrumentalist Nic Burke, then aged 21, who he had seen playing in Sheffield, to play electric guitar and keytar. To round off the line-up in 2002, percussionist Errol Rollins was added to play the electronic drum kit. Rollins was replaced by Rob Barton in 2004. As a point of honour, the band refuses to use playback; they always play live and rehearse before every appearance, ensuring that no two performances are the same. This was clearly demonstrated in 2002, when the band was booked to appear on UK national TV channel GMTV, where they were to play "Don't You Want Me" before being interviewed. The producer was astounded when the band arrived at 5 am (three hours early), expecting to set up and rehearse; it had been assumed they would just mime to playback. Joanne Catherall explained why on air during the interview: "We simply don't sound like we did 20 years ago; it would be wrong if we used tapes, so we do everything live."

In 2003, a second single from Secrets, "Love Me Madly?", was released independently as a private venture by Nukove, a small independent label especially set up to release Human League material, but it did not have funds for promotion and the single did not chart. Also in 2003, Virgin Records released The Very Best of The Human League, alongside a DVD of the same name which featured most of the band's music videos.

Throughout the following years, the band continued to tour frequently, enjoying success and popularity as a live act. In 2004, they released their first ever live album Live at the Dome, with an accompanying DVD of the same name, recorded at the Brighton Dome.

At the end of 2005, together with EMI, the band released a compilation album of remixes. Called The Human League Original Remixes and Rarities, it was aimed at the DJ/Dance market in the US and UK.

As well as dedicated Human League tours, the band has appeared at many independent concerts and festivals worldwide. They have played at the V Festival in 2004 and 2009, Homelands in 2005, Nokia Trends in Brazil 2005, and Festival Internacional de Benicàssim in 2007.

On 22 September 2006, the band performed on the US network television show Jimmy Kimmel Live!. The band's highlight of 2006 was a performance to an audience of 18,000 at the Hollywood Bowl, Los Angeles, on 24 October 2006, one of their largest concerts to date. This was followed up by an 11-venue tour of Europe in November and December 2006.

The band has been the subject of, and appeared in, various TV documentaries and features, including Channel 4's Made in Sheffield and the BBC's Young Guns: The Bands of the Early 1980s. In June 2007, Catherall and Sulley presented a documentary on Sheffield's pop music history entitled The Nation's Music Cities for VH1.

In November and December 2007, to mark their 30th anniversary (1977–2007), the band conducted their highest profile tour since the Secrets tour of 2001. The 'Dare! 2007' tour encompassed 20 European venues from London to Stockholm, most of which were sold out. Their set list included (for the first time ever) a performance of Dare, played sequentially and in its entirety. This included Philip Oakey playing The Human League's instrumental arrangement of the theme from "Get Carter" on an original Casio VL-Tone from 1981. The remainder of the concert was dedicated to songs from the band's other albums and also included the Oakey/Moroder song "Together in Electric Dreams". The band invested heavily in the stage set and lighting for the tour, including elaborate high definition video backgrounds provided by set designer Rob Sinclair.

A 12" single remix of "Things That Dreams Are Made Of" (originally from the Dare! album) was released in the UK in January 2008, by Hooj Choons. It peaked at #2 on the UK Dance chart.

In August and September 2008, the band headlined the US Regeneration Tour, supported by ABC, A Flock of Seagulls, Naked Eyes, and, at some venues, Belinda Carlisle.

In November and December 2008, the Human League got together with Heaven 17 and Martin Fry's ABC for 'The Steel City Tour' of the UK. This was Philip Oakey's concept of a joint tour of all three bands celebrating the original electronic music of early 1980s Sheffield (the titular Steel City). Much was made of The Human League and Heaven 17 working together, with Oakey and Martyn Ware saying that any acrimony from 1980 had long since been forgotten.

At Falkirk festival in May 2007. From left: Neil Sutton, Nic Burke, David Beevers, Catherall, Rob Barton, Sulley, Oakey.

The Human League were one of the headline acts in the line-up at Spillers Wharf on 30 May 2009, in the Newcastle/Gateshead Evolution festival, and were one of the headline bands for Dubai's first music festival, the 'Dubai Sound City' festival, between 5 and 7 November 2009.

On 11 December 2009, The Human League signed a new recording contract with UK based Wall of Sound. They also have their own studio in Sheffield and are managed by Sidewinder Management Ltd. The band continue to record and play live, with regular appearances at music festivals worldwide, at many of which they are among the headliners.

Although the subject of retirement is often brought up in interviews, Oakey, Catherall and Sulley have all stated that they still enjoy performing and intend to carry on for "as long as they are filling concerts and people want to see them". Sulley has joked that she "has to carry on because she doesn't know how to do anything else".

=== 2010–2019: Credo and further tours ===
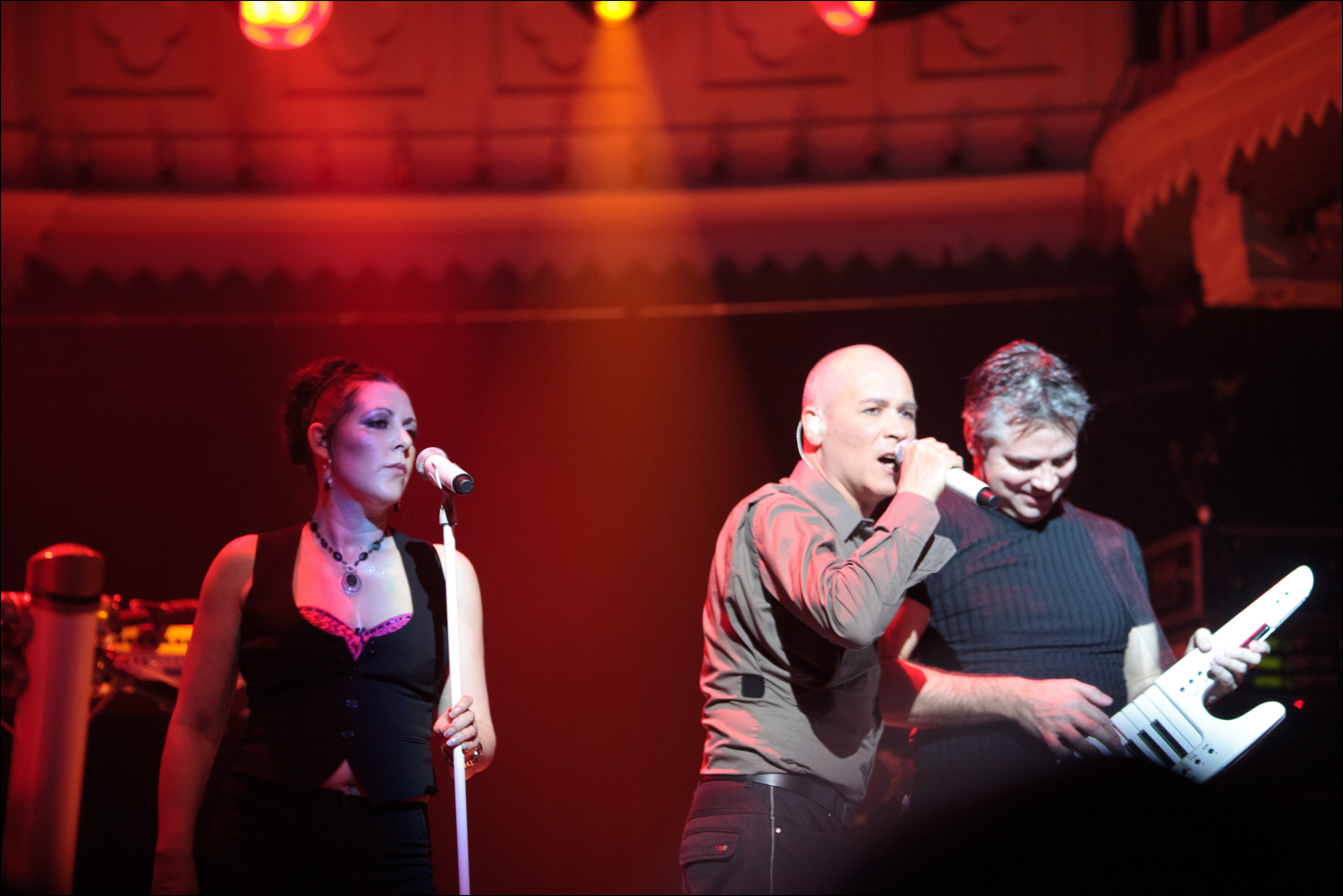
At Paradiso, Netherlands, in April 2011. From left to right: Catherall, Oakey and Sutton.

A new album, Credo, was released in March 2011. It peaked at #44 on the UK Albums Chart.

The first single from the album, "Night People" was released on 22 November 2010 but failed to enter the mainstream UK chart. It did, however, reach #25 in the UK Indie chart. The follow-up single, "Never Let Me Go", was released in the UK on 1 March 2011; however, in Germany, Switzerland and Austria, "Egomaniac" was chosen as the second single. A double vinyl edition of Credo was released on 25 July 2011, together with the download of "Sky", the third single from the album.

In 2012, to celebrate 35 years in existence, the band undertook the 'XXXV Tour' across Europe, playing in Amsterdam and Brussels followed by fifteen dates in the UK, from 20 November until 11 December. The shows were critically acclaimed. The British publication Daily Telegraph said "as good a night's entertainment as you are likely to find anywhere on the planet".

In March 2014, "Don't You Want Me" re-entered the Top 20 of the UK singles chart, thanks to a social media campaign from the fans of Aberdeen F.C., who won the Scottish League Cup the previous weekend. They have adopted the song as a terrace chant, citing their midfielder Peter Pawlett with the lyrics changed to "Peter Pawlett Baby".

In 2016, the band performed their 'A Very British Synthesizer Group' European and UK tour to accompany the release of the multi-disc anthology of the same name. It was the last tour with Neil Sutton, who left the band after 30 years in 2017. In late 2018, they undertook an extensive 'Red Tour' throughout Europe. The tour consisted of 28 dates, beginning in Brussels on 31 October and ending on 8 December in London.

In 2019, a 'deluxe' version of their 2001 Secrets album was released.

=== 2020–present: Further releases and anniversary tour ===
In 2020, similar 'deluxe' treatment was given to their 1995 Octopus album on its 25th anniversary. Also in 2020, a three-disc Essential collection from their Virgin Records years reached No. 13 in the UK Albums Chart. This compilation was unique in that the third disc, with the exception of the first two tracks, focused entirely on the band's pre-Dare material.

In 2021 the band embarked on the 'Dare 40' European and UK tour. They played the Dare album in full, as well as other songs from their back catalogue.

In 2023, they were one of the headliners at the Cruel World Festival in Pasadena, California; however, they had to cut short their performance owing to storms.

In March 2024 the group performed a nine-date tour of Australia, with further summer festival dates. Later that year they performed seventeen concerts as part of the Generations 2024 arena tour across Europe, beginning on 15 November in Stockholm and ending 14 December in London. They played shows including festival appearances in 2025 and have announced a full Generations tour covering America in 2026 and Australia and New Zealand in 2027.

== Musical style and legacy ==
The Human League were associated with the early synth-pop scene in the UK; Nightshift identified the group, along with fellow late 1970s debutants Gary Numan and Orchestral Manoeuvres in the Dark (OMD), as "the holy trinity of synth-pop". The Human League were also part of the new pop movement in the early 1980s, being described by Pitchfork as "the essence" of the scene: "Strikingly modern at the time, bright and tuneful beyond belief." Their song "Don't You Want Me" was the first song to exclusively use a drum machine to reach number one in the UK singles chart.

In 2000, the tribute album Reproductions: Songs of The Human League was released. It contains cover versions of 16 of the Human League's songs, including performances by Ladytron, Lali Puna, Momus, Future Bible Heroes, Stephin Merritt and the Aluminum Group. Elsewhere, Moby and Little Boots are longtime fans of the group.

The history of the band's Fast Product era is covered in the 2015 documentary, Big Gold Dream.

== Members ==
Current members

- Philip Oakey – lead vocals, keyboards (1977–present)
- Joanne Catherall – backing and lead vocals (1980–present)
- Susan Ann Sulley – backing and lead vocals (1980–present)

Current session / touring musicians

- David Beevers – studio engineer, synth programming, on-stage engineering (1988–present)
- Rob Barton – electronic percussion (2003–present)
- Ben Smith – keyboards, backing vocals (2017–present)
- Nick Banks – guitar, keyboards (2018–present)

Former members

- Ian Craig Marsh – keyboards, backing vocals (1977–1980)
- Martyn Ware – keyboards, backing vocals (1977–1980)
- Philip Adrian Wright – visuals (1977–1986), keyboards (1980–1986)
- Ian Burden – keyboards, bass, guitar (1980–1987)
- Jo Callis – guitar, keyboards, backing and occasional lead vocals (1981–1984)
- Jim Russell – drums, guitar, programming (1984–1987)
- Neil Sutton – keyboards (1987–2017)
- Russell Dennett – guitar, keyboards, backing vocals (1987–1995)

Former session / touring musicians

- Michael Douglas – keyboards (1981–1982)
- Meyrick Sainsbury – keyboards (1986–1987)
- Adam Everard – keyboards, guitar (1995–1998)
- Phil Edwards – keyboards (1995)
- Fergus Gerrand – drums, percussion (1995)
- Lyndon Connors – guitar (1998)
- Steve Williams – keyboards (1998)
- Nic Burke – guitar, keyboards (2001–2015)
- Errol Rollins – electronic percussion (2001–2004)
- Steve Vinter – drums (2001–2002)
- Josh Cana – guitar, keyboards (2016–2017)

== Line-ups ==
Period	Members	Releases
Early – Mid 1977 (The Future)	Ian Craig Marsh – synthesizer; Martyn Ware – synthesizer; Adi Newton – lead vocals	The Golden Hour of the Future (2002) – seven tracks
Mid 1977 – April 1978	Ian Craig Marsh – synthesizer; Martyn Ware – synthesizer; Philip Oakey – lead vocals, synthesizer	"Being Boiled" single (1978); Greatest Hits (1988) – one track; Greatest Hits (1995) – one track; The Golden Hour of the Future (2002) – twelve tracks; The Very Best of The Human League (2003) – one track
April 1978 – October 1980	Ian Craig Marsh – synthesizer; Martyn Ware – synthesizer; Philip Oakey – lead vocals, synthesizer; Philip Adrian Wright – visuals	The Dignity of Labour EP (1979); Reproduction (1979); Holiday '80 EP (1980); Travelogue (1980); The Very Best of The Human League (2003) – one track
October 1980 – April 1981	Philip Oakey – lead vocals, synthesizer; Philip Adrian Wright – visuals, synthesizer; Joanne Catherall – backing and lead vocals; Susan Ann Sulley – backing and lead vocals; Ian Burden – synthesizer, bass	"Boys and Girls" single (1981); Dare (1981) – one track; Greatest Hits (1988) – one track; Greatest Hits (1995) – one track; The Very Best of The Human League (2003) – one track
April 1981 – November 1984	Philip Oakey – lead vocals, synthesizer; Philip Adrian Wright – visuals, synthesizer; Joanne Catherall – backing and lead vocals; Susan Ann Sulley – backing and lead vocals; Ian Burden – synthesizer, bass; Jo Callis – synthesizer, guitar	Dare (1981); Love and Dancing (1982); Fascination! EP (1983); Hysteria (1984); Greatest Hits (1988) – eight tracks; Greatest Hits (1995) – eight tracks; The Very Best of The Human League (2003) – eight tracks
November 1984 – August 1986	Philip Oakey – lead vocals, synthesizer; Philip Adrian Wright – visuals, synthesizer; Joanne Catherall – backing and lead vocals; Susan Ann Sulley – backing and lead vocals; Ian Burden – synthesizer, bass; Jim Russell – drums	Crash (1986); Greatest Hits (1988) – two tracks; Greatest Hits (1995) – two tracks; The Very Best of The Human League (2003) – one track
August 1986 – May 1987	Philip Oakey – lead vocals, synthesizer; Joanne Catherall – backing and lead vocals; Susan Ann Sulley – backing and lead vocals; Ian Burden – synthesizer, bass; Jim Russell – drums	none – Crash tour only
May 1987 – December 1995	Philip Oakey – lead vocals, synthesizer; Joanne Catherall – backing and lead vocals; Susan Ann Sulley – backing and lead vocals; Neil Sutton – synthesizer; Russell Dennett – guitar	Romantic? (1990); YMO Versus The Human League EP (1993); Octopus (1995); Greatest Hits (1995) – two tracks including new track "Stay with Me Tonight"; The Very Best of The Human League (2003) – three tracks
December 1995 – May 2017	Philip Oakey – lead vocals, synthesizer; Joanne Catherall – backing and lead vocals; Susan Ann Sulley – backing and lead vocals; Neil Sutton – synthesizer	Secrets (2001); The Very Best of The Human League (2003) – one track; Live at the Dome (2005); Credo (2011)
May 2017 – present	Philip Oakey – lead vocals, synthesizer; Joanne Catherall – backing and lead vocals; Susan Ann Sulley – backing and lead vocals	none – touring only

== Discography ==
=== Studio albums ===
- Reproduction (1979)
- Travelogue (1980)
- Dare (1981)
- Hysteria (1984)
- Crash (1986)
- Romantic? (1990)
- Octopus (1995)
- Secrets (2001)
- Credo (2011)

== Awards and nominations ==
Award	Year	Nominee(s)	Category	Result	Ref.
Brit Awards	1982	Themselves	British Breakthrough Act	Won	
Brit Awards	1982	Dare	British Album of the Year	Nominated	
Grammy Awards	1983	Themselves	Best New Artist	Nominated	
Ivor Novello Awards	1982	"Don't You Want Me"	The Best Pop Song	Nominated	
Ivor Novello Awards	1982	"Don't You Want Me"	The Best Selling "A" Side	Nominated	
Ivor Novello Awards	1983	"Don't You Want Me"	International Hit of the Year	Nominated	
Q Awards	2004	Themselves	Innovation in Sound	Won	
UK Festival Awards	2010	GuilFest	Best Headline Performance	Nominated	
UK Festival Awards	2010	Themselves	Feel-Good Act of the Summer	Nominated	
