= Dare (album) =

1981 studio album by the Human League

Studio album by the Human League
- Released: 16 October 1981
- Recorded: March–September 1981
- Studio: Genetic Sound (Streatley, Berkshire)
- Genres: Synth-pop; electropop; new wave
- Length: 40:46
- Label: Virgin
- Producers: Martin Rushent; the Human League

The Human League chronology
Travelogue (1980)	Dare (1981)	Love and Dancing (1982)

Singles from Dare
- 1. "The Sound of the Crowd" Released: 24 April 1981; 2. "Love Action (I Believe in Love)" Released: 31 July 1981; 3. "Open Your Heart" Released: 2 October 1981; 4. "Don't You Want Me" Released: 27 November 1981

Dare (also released as Dare! in certain countries) is the third studio album by the English synth-pop band the Human League, first released in the United Kingdom in October 1981 and then subsequently in the US in mid-1982. The album was produced by Martin Rushent and recorded between March and September 1981, following the departure of founding members Martyn Ware and Ian Craig Marsh, and saw the band shift direction from their previous avant-garde electronic style toward a more pop-friendly, commercial sound led by frontman Philip Oakey.

Dare became critically acclaimed and proved to be a genre-defining album, its influence being felt in many areas of pop music. The album and its four singles were very successful, particularly "Don't You Want Me", which both Rolling Stone and The Village Voice credited with kickstarting the Second British Invasion. The album reached number one on the UK Albums Chart and has been certified triple platinum by the British Phonographic Industry (BPI).

A remix album based on Dare, named Love and Dancing, again produced by Rushent was released in 1982. This included remixes of tracks from the Dare album in a continuous mega mix style which was groundbreaking at the time and according to Rushent was very time-consuming to make.

== History ==
In January 1981, the Human League consisted of Philip Oakey and Philip Adrian Wright with newly-recruited teenage dancers/backing vocalists Joanne Catherall and Susan Ann Sulley. After the acrimonious split of the original band in October 1980 and the subsequent recruitment of Sulley and Catherall, the new band had only just survived a European tour by temporarily bringing in session keyboardist Ian Burden to assist them. As a result, the band was in substantial debt and only barely commercially viable. Under pressure from Virgin Records to produce results, original members Oakey and Wright returned to Monumental Studios in Sheffield to start recording demos. The track "Boys and Girls" from the 1980 tour, which Virgin released as a single, was more reminiscent of the band's earlier work. Sulley and Catherall, who were busy studying for their A-levels, appeared on the cover of the single but did not perform on the track itself. "Boys and Girls" peaked at number 47 on the UK Singles Chart. Afterwards, Oakey would bring in outside personnel to take the band in a more pop and commercial-sounding direction.

Oakey's first move was to invite guitarist and keyboard player Ian Burden from their 1980 tour to join the band full-time. Virgin had suggested that Oakey needed professional production and paired him with veteran producer Martin Rushent. He would move the band to his Genetic Sound Studios in rural Berkshire both due to the "unhealthy" atmosphere at Monumental Studios in Sheffield caused by the Human League sharing it with Heaven 17, and that Rushent's studios were better equipped for the type of music the band was making. A downside would be that the distance would cause problems for Sulley and Catherall who were taking their final school exams at the time and had to be regularly bussed down from Sheffield. In the studio, the songs were built up from a simple Linn LM-1 drum pattern, with the arrangements written out on a chart as they went along: each note was considered carefully at some point for the best emotional effect, as per Rushent's style. Each song took a week, with the final drum parts recorded last to tape with all the drum fills in place.

The first result of their recording sessions was released in April 1981 entitled "The Sound of the Crowd". The final addition to the band would be Jo Callis, the former guitarist and songwriter of the punk rock band the Rezillos.

The first release from the now-complete new team came in July 1981, "Love Action (I Believe in Love)", which peaked at number three in the UK. By September 1981, the album was finished and provisionally entitled Dare, after a Vogue magazine cover (U.K., April 1979, Gia Carangi). Oakey explained the story behind the album name at the time:

I like it because the Mekons used to have a song called "Dan Dare". In fact, it was ripped off from a cover of Vogue about two and a half years ago. They had a whole series of covers which featured just one word like "Success", "Red" and "Dare". I shouldn't say that, should I?

To prepare for the album's release (set for the end of October 1981), "Open Your Heart" was released - it went to number six in the UK. It was accompanied by a high-end promotional video. When the album was released, it was condemned by the Musicians' Union, who, among other concerns, felt that the new technology employed by the Human League would make traditional musicians redundant. They mounted a "Keep It Live" campaign, believing that bands like the Human League would be able to perform concerts at the touch of a button.

Virgin executive Simon Draper's next choice would be the track "Don't You Want Me", the duet that Oakey had recorded with teenage backing singer Susanne Sulley. Oakey was unhappy with the decision and originally fought it, believing it to be the weakest track on Dare; for that reason, it had been relegated to the last track on the second side of the vinyl album. Oakey was eventually overruled by Virgin. It would go on to become the band's most successful hit, selling millions of copies worldwide and becoming the 25th highest-selling single in the UK (as of 2007). It was also the Christmas number one for 1981.

== Release ==
The album was a massive commercial success, reaching number one on the UK Albums Chart in its second week of release. The album's release was expected to be the climax of an enormously successful year for the band, but Virgin Records' Simon Draper decided he wanted an additional single from the album before the end of the year. By Christmas 1981, Dare had gone platinum in the UK, and the Human League had a number-one album and number-one single concurrently on the UK charts. Dare would eventually remain on the UK Albums Chart for 71 weeks. A remix album, called Love and Dancing, was released in July 1982.

=== International releases ===
The single "Don't You Want Me" was released with an expensive and elaborate promotional video created by film-maker Steve Barron. Music videos were a relatively new phenomenon, and cable TV station MTV had only just started to capitalise on this new media, although having very little material to work with. Virgin Records syndicated the video to MTV, and it was played around the clock. Because of the interest the video generated in "Don't You Want Me", Virgin licensed the release in the US of the single and the album. The licensee for the US was A&M Records, which renamed the album Dare! The addition of the exclamation mark was because A&M wanted to differentiate their (US) release from Virgin's original release in the UK. The release of Dare! immediately mirrored the success of the UK; and in mid-1982 it reached number three on the US Billboard 200 and the single "Don't You Want Me" went to number one on the Billboard Hot 100. Although critics were not as universally applauding as in the UK, the commercial success of Dare! would set the scene for the band's return to the US charts several times in later years.

Dare earned considerable income for record labels Virgin and A&M; in Virgin's case, it gave the label its first chart-topping album since Mike Oldfield's Tubular Bells in 1973. "Don't You Want Me" was the label's first-ever chart-topping single. The success of Dare was responsible for saving the label from impending bankruptcy. A very grateful Richard Branson sent Philip Oakey a motorcycle as a thank-you present, but Oakey had to return it as he couldn't ride it.

As well as the commercial success in the US under A&M, in 1982 Dare was also highly successful in Australia, Japan, France and Germany. Dare has been re-released several times since its original creation. The 1997 U.S. CD release on Caroline Records included the additional B-side tracks "Hard Times" and "Non-Stop". In 2002 (UK)/2003 (U.S.), another re-release combined Dare and Love and Dancing on one CD. In 2012, a 2-CD box set compiled Dare, several bonus remixes and an expanded version of the Fascination! EP, which was released separately in Japan in 2015.

=== Packaging ===
Dare internal gatefold artwork 1981 – Sulley and Catherall

The cover art and other album artwork are based on a concept that Oakey wanted, that the album should look like an issue of Vogue. The final design was a joint effort between Philip Adrian Wright (also the band's director of visuals) and graphic designer Ken Ansell. Its typography and design closely resemble the cover of German Vogue's May 1981 issue, featuring Paulina Porizkova. Oakey is solo on the front cover with Sulley and Catherall on the internal gatefold, Wright on the back cover, and Callis and Burden on the inner sleeve. The artwork has been reproduced in numerous forms for various re-releases and sold as posters.

Explaining why the band's portraits are close-cropped and the girls with their hair tied back, Susan Ann Sulley explains, "We wanted people to still be able to buy the album in five years, we thought that hair styles would be the first thing to date. We had no idea people would still be buying it 25 years later."

== Critical reception ==
Dare was critically acclaimed in the UK. In Melody Maker, Steve Sutherland celebrated the fact the album would irritate guitar-rock traditionalists, saying, "All let's-pretend-pompous it's cornily consistent, cultured, crude, elegant, cheap ... anything you want it to be. Me? I think it's a masterpiece. Sure to upset some, sell to millions more and so it should, the way it tramps all over rock traditions. A trite sound, a retarded glam image and a mock respect. All the appeal in the world ... Dare should show up the pathetic farce of pop mythology once and for all." Smash Hits critic David Hepworth called it "chock-full of precise, memorable melodies delivered with style and humour". Noted music critic Paul Morley wrote in the NME, "Dare is the second intoxicating intervention to be produced out of the great split [referring to Ian Craig Marsh and Martyn Ware leaving the first incarnation of the Human League, and their album Penthouse and Pavement released with their new band Heaven 17], and already it's the first Human League greatest hits collection ... Much more than ABBA or whoever you like, the Human League signify that deliciously serious, sincerely disposable MOR music can possess style, quality and sophistication ... I think that Dare is one of the GREAT popular music LPs."

In the US, Rolling Stone rated Dare four out of five stars, with reviewer David Fricke commending the Human League for finding "an appealing balance between modern technique and tuneful charm" on an album of "artfully grabby" songs. Robert Christgau of The Village Voice was less impressed, giving it a "B−" grade and remarking that "Philip Oakey comes on like three kinds of pompous jerk."

According to the book Let It Blurt: The Life and Times of Lester Bangs, renowned music critic Lester Bangs died of an accidental drug overdose while listening to Dare.

=== Awards ===
Dare featured in multiple year-end polls for 1981. It was ranked the sixth best album of 1981 by the NME, and was voted Album of the Year in the 1981 Smash Hits readers' poll. Martin Rushent received the Brit Award for Best British Producer at the 1982 ceremony for his production on Dare, while the band won the award for Best British Newcomer.

== Legacy ==
Retrospective professional ratings
Review scores
Source	Rating
AllMusic	5/5 stars
BBC Online	5/5
Mojo	4/5 stars
Muzik	5/5 stars
Pitchfork	9.1/10
Q	5/5 stars
Record Collector	5/5 stars
The Rolling Stone Album Guide	3/5 stars
Spin Alternative Record Guide	9/10
Uncut	10/10

Dare has appeared on several lists of the greatest albums of all time. Sounds magazine ranked it the 81st-best album of all time in 1986 and the 44th-best album of the 1980s three years later. In 1990, Dare was listed by Rolling Stone as the 78th-best album of the previous decade. Q placed the record at number 69 on its 2000 list of the "100 Greatest British Albums Ever"; the same magazine, in 2006, ranked Dare the 19th-best album of the 1980s. In 2006, British Hit Singles & Albums and NME organised a poll in which 40,000 people worldwide voted for the 100 best albums ever, with Dare placing at number 77. Slant Magazine listed it in 2012 as the 86th-best album of the 1980s. In 2013, NME ranked the record 111th on its list of "The 500 Greatest Albums of All Time". Meanwhile, Uncut ranked Dare 132nd on its list of the 200 greatest albums of all time in 2015. Paste placed Dare at number 34 on its 2016 list of the best new wave albums.

The album was also included in the 2018 edition of Robert Dimery's book 1001 Albums You Must Hear Before You Die.

=== 25th anniversary ===
Dare Tour 2007 artwork – Sulley, Oakey, Catherall

To celebrate the 25th anniversary of the release of Dare (and the 30th anniversary of the formation of the band), the modern-day Human League (Oakey, Sulley and Catherall from the original 1981 band lineup) conducted a special Dare 2007 tour of the UK and Europe playing the original album live in full during November and December 2007. An updated version of the album's cover artwork, now with recent photographs of Sulley, Oakey and Catherall in the style of the original artwork, accompanied the advertising for the tour.

Martin Rushent, interviewed in the July 2010 issue of Sound on Sound magazine, said he was working on a remastered 30th anniversary edition of the album which would include new mixes of its tracks using real instruments rather than synthesisers. However, Rushent died in June 2011 with the project unreleased.

=== Virgin40 ===
Dare was one of the Virgin Records albums selected for special picture disc release to mark the 40th anniversary of the group's erstwhile record label.

== Track listing ==
Side 1
No.	Title	Writer(s)	Length
1.	"The Things That Dreams Are Made Of"	Oakey, Wright	4:14
2.	"Open Your Heart"	Callis, Oakey	3:53
3.	"The Sound of the Crowd"	Burden, Oakey	3:56
4.	"Darkness"	Callis, Wright	3:56
5.	"Do or Die"	Burden, Oakey	5:25

Side 2
No.	Title	Writer(s)	Length
6.	"Get Carter" (instrumental)	Roy Budd	1:02
7.	"I Am the Law"	Oakey, Wright	4:09
8.	"Seconds"	Callis, Oakey, Wright	4:58
9.	"Love Action (I Believe in Love)"	Burden, Oakey	4:58
10.	"Don't You Want Me"	Callis, Oakey, Wright	3:56

CD bonus tracks (Caroline Records, CAROL 1114-2, US, released 1997)
No.	Title	Writer(s)	Length
11.	"Hard Times"	Oakey, Wright, Callis	5:42
12.	"Non-Stop"	Callis, Wright	4:15

- Track 11 was the B-side of the "Love Action (I Believe in Love)" single. Track 12 was the B-side of the "Open Your Heart" single.

Dare/Fascination! 2CD box set bonus tracks (Virgin Records, CDVD 2192, UK, released 2012)
No.	Title	Writer(s)	Length
11.	"The Sound of the Crowd" (12" version)	Burden, Oakey	6:28
12.	"Don't You Want Me" (extended mix)	Callis, Oakey, Wright	7:31
13.	"The Sound of the Crowd" (instrumental)	Burden, Oakey	4:12
14.	"Open Your Heart/Non-Stop" (instrumentals)	Callis, Oakey/Callis, Wright	8:41
15.	"Don't You Want Me" (alternative version)	Callis, Oakey, Wright	3:57

- For the second CD, see Fascination!.

== Personnel ==
Credits are adapted from the album's liner notes.

The Human League

- Ian Burden – synthesizers
- Jo Callis – synthesizers
- Joanne Catherall – vocals
- Philip Oakey – vocals, synthesizers, cover design
- Susan Ann Sulley – vocals
- Philip Adrian Wright – slides, occasional synthesizer, cover design

Additional personnel

- Martin Rushent – programming
- Dave Allen – assistant programming and engineering
- Ken Ansell – cover layout and coordination
- Brian Aris – photography

== Studio equipment used ==
The following studio equipment was used in the recording of the album:

- Casio M10
- Casio VL-1
- Korg 770
- Korg Delta
- Linn LM-1
- Roland Jupiter-4
- Roland MC-8
- Roland System 700
- Yamaha CS-15

== Charts ==
=== Weekly charts ===
Weekly chart performance for Dare
Chart (1981–1982)	Peak position
Australian Albums (Kent Music Report)	3
Canada Top Albums/CDs (RPM)	1
Dutch Albums (Album Top 100)	11
Finnish Albums (Suomen virallinen lista)	2
German Albums (Offizielle Top 100)	19
Italian Albums (Musica e dischi)	15
Japanese Albums (Oricon)	75
New Zealand Albums (RMNZ)	1
Norwegian Albums (VG-lista)	6
Swedish Albums (Sverigetopplistan)	1
UK Albums (Official Charts)	1
US Billboard 200	3

=== Year-end charts ===
1981 year-end chart performance for Dare
Chart (1981)	Position
UK Albums (BMRB)	3

1982 year-end chart performance for Dare
Chart (1982)	Position
Australian Albums (Kent Music Report)	2
Canada Top Albums/CDs (RPM)	10
Dutch Albums (Album Top 100)	64
New Zealand Albums (RMNZ)	6
UK Albums (BMRB)	8
US Billboard 200	29

== Certifications ==
Certifications for Dare
Region	Certification	Certified units/sales
Australia (ARIA)	Platinum	50,000^{^}
Canada (Music Canada)	Platinum	100,000^{^}
Netherlands (NVPI)	Gold	50,000^{^}
New Zealand (RMNZ)	Platinum	15,000^{^}
United Kingdom (BPI)	3× Platinum	900,000^{^}
United States (RIAA)	Gold	500,000^{^}
^{^} Shipments figures based on certification alone.
