= Crazy Daisy Nightclub =

Former nightclub in Sheffield, South Yorkshire, England

Coordinates: 53.382823°N 1.467849°W

The Crazy Daisy Nightclub
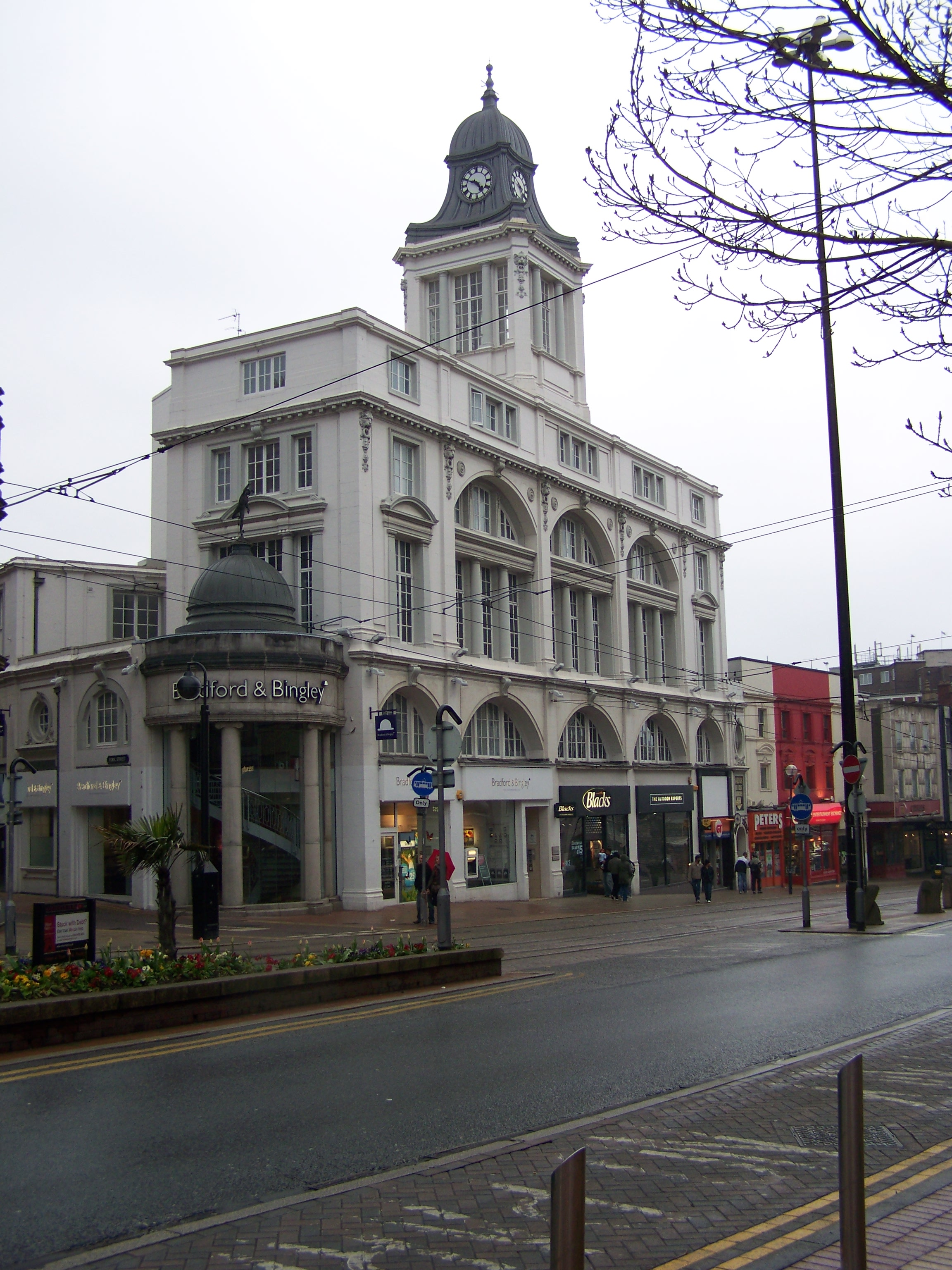
- The site of The Crazy Daisy Nightclub Today ('Blacks' is where the main entrance once stood)
- Interactive map of The Crazy Daisy Nightclub
- Former names: The Bier Keller, The Geisha Bar, Legends
- Location: 20 - 21 High Street, Sheffield, S1 1PU, England.
- Owner: Tetley
- Type: nightclub
- Event: New wave

Construction
- Built: 1920s
- Opened: 1973 (as Crazy DaiZy) 1978 (As Crazy DaiSy)
- Closed: 1988

The Crazy Daisy Nightclub was a discothèque and dance club in Sheffield, South Yorkshire, England in the mid-1970s to late 1980s, located originally on the corner of York Street and High Street, Sheffield. It was known as The Beer Keller in the early to mid-1970s. It was renamed the Crazy Daizy in 1973 and run by Mecca. Lunch-time discos and Bryan Ferry nights were popular in the mid-1970s. In 1978 it was taken over by the Tetley company. Situated in the basement of an art deco building, it featured numerous supporting pillars and a steep, sweeping staircase down from the entrance.

The Crazy Daiz(s)y club was in business from 1973 to the late 1980s. At the time it became synonymous with the avant-garde early 1980s music scene. During its tenure it was a central social focal point in Sheffield city centre and claims a key role in 1980s Sheffield culture and British pop music history.

It later became the Geisha Bar (in the 1980s), then Legends Nightclub, and subsequently closed in the mid-1990s when the Sheffield social scene shifted to the redeveloped West Street area. The building is now used as a bank and shops, next to a Sheffield Supertram stop.

== The Human League story ==
The club is principally known in UK/US pop history and worldwide as the 'birthplace' of the 'Mark Two' (commercially successful) version of the pop group The Human League.

In October 1980, Philip Oakey (lead singer of the group) spotted two teenage girls dancing together on the dance floor. Susan Ann Sulley (17) and Joanne Catherall (18) were two totally unknown schoolgirls and best friends on a night out together. Neither had any experience of singing or dancing professionally. With no preamble, Oakey asked both girls to join the tour as dancers and incidental vocalists. The Human League continues recording and touring internationally, over 40 years later, still complete with Sulley and Catherall.

== Other famous connections ==
Another regular patron of the Crazy Daisy in the early 1980s was stage and Hollywood film actor Sean Bean who recalls his nights in the club during an interview for Exposed magazine in January 2007.

== The building today ==
The last nightclub to occupy the building was Legends, which closed in the mid-1990s. Because the nighttime social scene had since moved on, the site was redeveloped into commercial units. Since its redevelopment, an outlet of Blacks outdoor pursuits store is now where the main entrance once stood and the bank Santander dominates the main building. Today there is no indication of the building's heritage or history. Because of its history, the site is mentioned on a number of Sheffield tour guides, Sheffield city web sites and almost every Human League website/book.

As of November 2021, the space is now occupied by a Sainsbury's Local whilst the bank portion has remained vacant for years.

== In the media ==
- In 2004, for its association with The Human League, the Crazy Daisy was nominated as one of Britain's top "Rock Landmarks" in a feature programme of the same name, although it did not eventually make the final top 10.
- In 2007, the VH1 UK documentary The Nation's Music Cities – (Sheffield) (first broadcast on 26 May 2007) featured a prominent section on The Crazy Daisy. The documentary included an interview with Susan Ann Sulley and Joanne Catherall which was filmed outside Blacks (the former club entrance), where they discussed the building's significance and its history in the 1980s.
- In 2008, artist Pete McKee produced a Pop Art painting entitled The Night Phil Oakey met Susan and Joanne which depicts Sulley and Catherall arriving at The Crazy Daisy on the night they were discovered in October 1980.
