= Joanne Catherall =

English singer (born 1962)

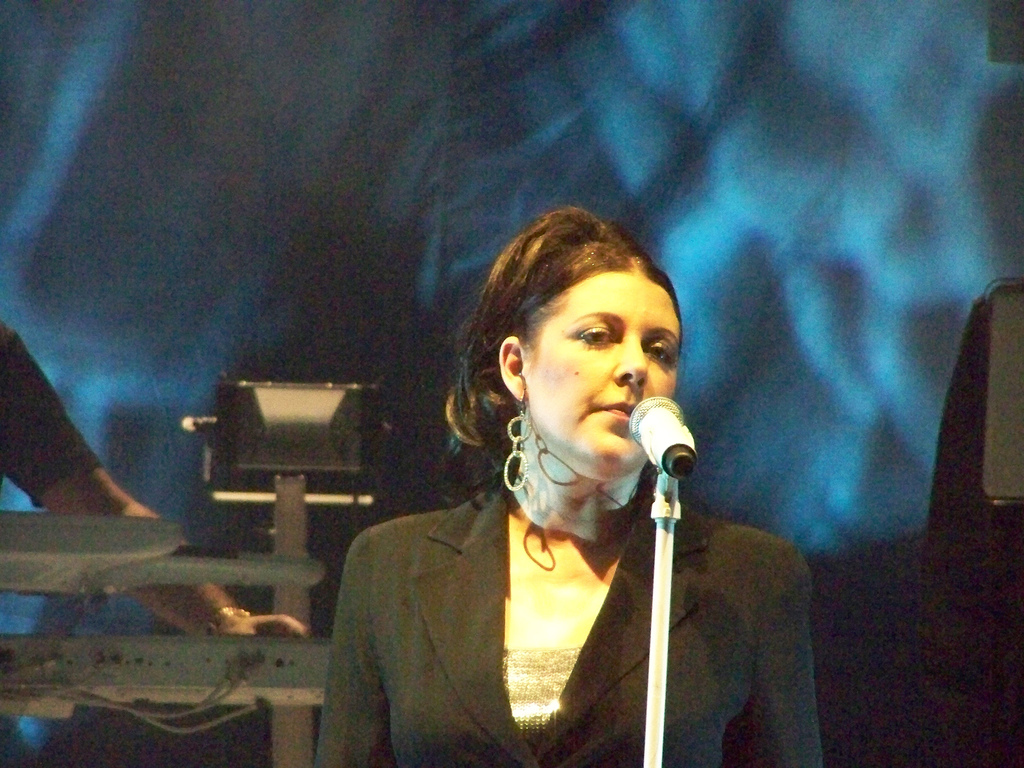
- Catherall performing in 2008

Background information
- Born: 18 September 1962 (age 64)
- Origin: Sheffield, South Yorkshire, England
- Genres: Synth-pop; new wave; electronic
- Occupation: Singer
- Years active: 1980–present
- Labels: Virgin; A&M; EastWest; Papillon; Wall of Sound
- Member of: The Human League

Joanne Catherall (born 18 September 1962) is an English singer who is one of two female vocalists in the English synth-pop band the Human League.

In 1980, when Catherall had just turned 18 and was still at school doing A levels, she and her best friend Susan Ann Sulley were discovered in Sheffield's Crazy Daisy Nightclub by Philip Oakey, the lead singer and a founding member of the Human League. At his invitation, the pair then joined Oakey as he formed a new and subsequently commercially successful line-up of the band, following the acrimonious departure of two other founding members of the band.

Catherall has remained in the band ever since, and is a joint business partner in the band (along with Oakey and Sulley), which continues to perform today.

== Sheffield 1980 and "The Crazy Daisy" ==
The Human League had recently split acrimoniously over creative differences, leaving only two of the original four members, Oakey and Adrian Wright, to continue. Crucially, The Human League was contracted to a European tour starting within a week. Already in debt to Virgin Records, Oakey had to recruit new band members in a matter of days for the tour or be sued by the tour's promoters, face bankruptcy, and see the end of the band. Oakey went into Sheffield one evening to recruit a single female backing singer for the tour, needed to replace the original high backing vocals of the now departed Martyn Ware. He noticed Catherall and Sulley dancing together in the Crazy Daisy and now states that they stood out from all the other girls in the club due to their unique dress sense, immaculate make-up, and idiosyncratic but sophisticated dance moves. Without preamble, Oakey asked both girls to join the tour as dancers and incidental vocalists.

Catherall now states that she knew it was a genuine offer, as Oakey was well known in Sheffield; she and Sulley already had tickets to see The Human League on the Doncaster leg of their tour. Catherall and Sulley agreed to the offer immediately, despite having no singing or professional dancing experience.

Because the girls were 17 and 18 years old, the final decision regarding going on the tour lay with their parents. The parents of both the girls were unhappy with the idea and initially refused to give their consent. This was overturned reluctantly when Oakey, complete with his then trademark lop-sided haircut, red lipstick and high heeled shoes, visited both sets of parents to convince them that the girls would come to no harm. Catherall and Sulley's school also agreed to the absence, as it was thought visiting Europe would be educational.

The first European tour of the Human League got underway with the two young recruits assigned to dancing and incidental vocal duties. The girls at this stage were just guests in the group on a salary of £30 a week. Although the tour was a success, the crowds were largely hostile to Catherall and Sulley, as fans had bought tickets for the original all male line-up. Catherall recalls dodging several beer cans thrown at her during the tour and was often heckled. During the tour, Oakey had experimented with the girls singing on a number of the original tracks and was impressed with the results; he was also impressed with the girls' professionalism and determination during the tour.

On return to Sheffield in December 1980, both girls were made full-time members of the Human League.

== 1981 and the release of Dare ==
After the tour, Catherall and Sulley returned to school full-time while Wright and Oakey set about composing and songwriting. The new Human League of Sulley, Oakey, Catherall and Wright started to gain ground in early 1981 with the release of the single "Boys and Girls". Although it charted only at number 48, it was the most successful single at that point. The girls were not used in the production, as the song was written without any female backing, and they were busy with school, however they were featured on the record sleeve and in promotional photo shoots.

Soon after "Boys and Girls" came the recruitment of professional musicians Ian Burden and Jo Callis, which sharpened the band's output considerably. Now working with a new producer, Martin Rushent, the band's next single, "Sound of the Crowd", was their commercial breakthrough, becoming a Top 20 hit. It was also the first single to include both Catherall's and Sulley's vocals. The band were invited to play on the UK's principal music programme BBC TV's Top of the Pops with only a few hours' notice. The first Catherall knew about her first appearance on TV was when Sulley's mother rushed to collect her and Sulley from school mid-lessons for the drive to the London studios.

By this time, music videos had become highly popular for broadcast TV. Spurred on by pre-filmed promos and live TV appearances, the band started to refine their personal appearance styles for a commercial audience. Catherall adopted the striking black kohl eye make-up and bright red lipstick, which became her trademark early-1980s style.

The band reached the Top Ten with their next two singles, "Love Action" and "Open Your Heart". In October 1981, the band released their next studio album Dare. By now, the Human League were in their ascendancy and were becoming extremely popular with the mainstream British public.

== Release of "Don't You Want Me" ==
In mid November 1981, with the Human League fully in the public eye, and sales of the album Dare soaring, Virgin records decided to release one more single from Dare. Oakey had always disliked the track "Don't You Want Me". Virgin Records had more faith; they commissioned an expensive and elaborate promo video to accompany the release of "Don't You Want Me".

Shot on 35mm film rather than videotape, the promo was filmed in late November 1981 in Slough, Berkshire. The scenario was "a movie shoot for a murder mystery film" and is lyrically a conflicting duet between Oakey and Sulley, with backing vocals from Catherall.

Premiering in December 1981, the video was played on British television frequently. The memorable opening scene of the video has Catherall in a fur coat, standing on a rural road corner. The night is freezing; she is surrounded by swirling mist and accompanied by the deep opening synth chords.

1981 also saw the start up of cable TV channel MTV in the US. However, the channel was limited, in that music videos were a new medium, and there were relatively few available. The syndication by Virgin Records of "Don't You Want Me"'s promo to MTV, and ensuing airplay, brought The Human League to US audiences. The subsequent interest prompted Virgin Records to release Dare in the US as "Don't You Want Me" rose in the US charts to number one, aided by the promo video.

== Remaining 1980s ==
In 1982, riding on the success of Dare, the Human League embarked on an international tour. On completion of the tour, the group returned to the recording studios to start on the follow-up to Dare. In November 1982, the Motown-inspired single "Mirror Man" hit the UK charts, peaking at number two. Six months later, the group released the single, "(Keep Feeling) Fascination". Aided by a promo video, this single also made number two in the UK and number eight in the US.

Following this, the recording sessions for their next album became fraught with tension, and producer Martin Rushent departed from the project, as did later producer Chris Thomas. They were replaced by producer Hugh Padgham, and the subsequent album Hysteria was released in mid-1984, three years after Dare. Although it entered the charts at number three, the album failed to match the success of Dare and quickly dropped out of the charts.

With Oakey working on side projects, rumours that the band had split were perpetuated in the press. In 1986, Virgin Records paired the Human League with US production team Jimmy Jam and Terry Lewis. The band decamped to the US to record. Creative tensions disturbed their time there, both in the band and with the production team. Sulley and Catherall, who had fortunately absolved themselves of any creative responsibility in 1981, were exempted from the bickering but were homesick and unhappy in the US. Creatively, the US recordings ended in acrimony but not complete disaster.

The single "Human" was released in August 1986. A ballad about separation and infidelity, it gave Catherall her most prominent vocals in any Human League single. The promo video was typical of mid-1980s gloss and the single peaked at number one in the US and number eight in the UK. The subsequent album, Crash, emerged from the Jam and Lewis sessions and reached number seven in the UK.

== 1990s ==
The Human League reconvened for their 1990 album Romantic?, which Catherall contributed vocals for, but the album was not well received, only charting barely and receiving little critical support. By now, the Human League consisted solely of Catherall, Philip Oakey and Susan Sulley with supporting musicians.

The Human League found a new record label in the form of EastWest records. Using material rejected by Virgin, and new material written by Oakey and Sutton, the band released a new studio album in 1995. Propelled by some radio friendly singles, Octopus returned the band to the UK top 10 for the first time since the 1980s. After the band performed on several UK TV music shows, various talk shows were keen to interview them. On one occasion, during an interview of ITV's This Morning, host Richard Madeley made the mistake of telling viewers that the band were making an "80s comeback", prompting an irritated Catherall to reply: "We've never stopped working, we've never been away!"

== Personal life ==
Catherall and Philip Oakey had a relationship. They split amicably after several years, remaining friends and colleagues. Catherall subsequently married.

== Film and television ==
- 1999 Hunting Venus (Buffalo Films, D. Martin Clunes) – Herself
- 2007 VH1 – Presenter

== Awards ==
- 1982 BRIT Awards – (as 'The Human League') – 'Best British Breakthrough Act'
- 2004 Q Awards – (as 'The Human League') – 'The Q Innovation in Sound Award'
- Nominated for Grammy Award in 1982 for Best International Act (as 'The Human League')
