= Holiday '80 =

- UK 2×7" and 12" cover

EP by The Human League
- Released: 18 April 1980
- Recorded: Devonshire Lane, Sheffield February 1980
- Genre: Synthpop, new wave
- Length: 23:23
- Label: Virgin
- Producer: John Leckie; The Human League

The Human League singles chronology
Empire State Human (1979)	Holiday '80 (1980)	Only After Dark (1980)

Holiday '80 is an EP released by the original line-up of the British synthpop band The Human League. The EP was issued in the UK by Virgin Records in April 1980, a month before the release of the band's second album Travelogue. The EP peaked at no. 56 in the UK Singles Chart in May 1980, but was later reissued and returned to the chart, peaking at no. 46 in February 1982.

The recordings were produced with John Leckie, who had also been working with new wave bands such as Simple Minds and XTC. The principal song on the EP was "Marianne", however Virgin felt the band's preferred version of the track was not strong enough and refused to release it. The EP also featured a new, more elaborate recording of the band's debut single "Being Boiled", which would subsequently be included on the Travelogue album. The last track was a medley consisting of a cover of Gary Glitter's "Rock and Roll" (titled "Rock 'n' Roll" in the track listings) seguéing into the Iggy Pop track "Nightclubbing". The Japanese release also features the song "Toyota City", which also appears on Travelogue.

The track "Dancevision" is a short instrumental track originally recorded by Ian Craig Marsh and Martyn Ware under the name of The Future, of which Adi Newton had also been a part. Newton released a longer version of "Dancevision" in 2015 as part of his career spanning Horology 2 compilation, which also included several other tracks recorded as The Future. The 2002 CD release The Golden Hour of the Future did not include "Dancevision".

The UK release of Holiday '80 was as a double 7" (containing four tracks) and two single 7" versions (both containing three tracks each), all with the same catalogue number, and a 12" EP (containing four tracks). The Japanese release was a 12" with different tracks to the UK 12".

The band performed "Rock 'n' Roll" on Top of the Pops on 8 May 1980, even though the EP had not entered the Top 40. Although the EP would chart no higher than 56 after their appearance, the band garnered mainstream attention and their album Travelogue would enter the UK Top 20, peaking at no. 16, following the performance. This would be the band's only Top of the Pops appearance featuring the original line-up of Oakey, Ware, Marsh and Wright. The performance was officially issued for the first time on the DVD of the 2016 anthology by The Human League, A Very British Synthesizer Band. The anthology CD also features "Nightclubbing" as a standalone song without being immediately preceded by "Rock 'n' Roll".

== Critical reception ==
Professional ratings
Review scores
Source	Rating
Allmusic	3/5 stars

On 26 April 1980 Tony Jasper, reviewer of British music newspaper Music Week, named "Rock 'n' Roll / Nightclubbing" medley an "infectious tongue-in-cheek mix", "best commercial cut" and predicted a debut chart entrance "for this clever Sheffield band".

== Track listing ==
UK 2×7" Gatefold (Virgin SV-105)

1. "Marianne" (Marsh/Oakey/Ware) 3:17
2. "Dancevision" (Marsh/Ware) 2:21 [performed by The Future]
3. "Being Boiled" (Album Version) (Marsh/Oakey/Ware) 4:22
4. "Rock 'n' Roll / Nightclubbing" (Gary Glitter, Mike Leander) (Jim Osterberg, David Bowie) 6:22

UK 12" (Virgin SV-105-12)

1. "Marianne" (Marsh/Oakey/Ware) 3:17
2. "Being Boiled" (Album Version) (Marsh/Oakey/Ware) 4:22
3. "Dancevision" (Marsh/Ware) 2:21 [performed by The Future]
4. "Rock 'n' Roll / Nightclubbing" (Glitter, Leander) (Osterberg, Bowie) 6:22

UK 7" Holiday '80: Being Boiled (Virgin SV-105)

1. Being Boiled (Oakey) 4:10
2. Marianne (Oakey) 3:14
3. Dancevision (Marsh/Ware) 2:15

UK 7" Holiday '80: Rock 'n' Roll (Virgin SV-105)

1. Rock 'n' Roll (Glitter, Leander) 3:15
2. Being Boiled (Oakey) 4:10
3. Dancevision (Marsh/Ware) 2:15

Japanese 12" (Virgin VIP-5906)

1. "Marianne" (Marsh/Oakey/Ware) 3:17
2. "Dancevision" (Marsh/Ware) 2:21 [performed by The Future]
3. "Toyota City" (Marsh/Ware) 5:33
4. "Rock 'n' Roll / Nightclubbing" (Glitter, Leander) (Osterberg, Bowie) 6:22
5. "Being Boiled" (Album Version) (Marsh/Oakey/Ware) 4:22

== Charts ==
Chart	Peak position
U.K. 1980	56
U.K. 1982	46
