= Open Your Heart (The Human League song) =

Single by the Human League

from the album Dare
- B-side: "Non-Stop"
- Released: 2 October 1981
- Recorded: Genetic Sound (Streatley, Berkshire)
- Genre: New wave; electropop
- Length: 3:56
- Label: Virgin
- Songwriters: Philip Oakey; Jo Callis
- Producer: Martin Rushent

The Human League singles chronology
"Love Action (I Believe in Love)" (1981)	"Open Your Heart" (1981)	"Don't You Want Me" (1981)

"Open Your Heart" is a song by the English synth-pop band the Human League. It was released as a single in the UK on 2 October 1981 by Virgin Records and peaked at number six in the UK singles chart. It was written jointly by lead vocalist Philip Oakey and keyboardist Jo Callis. The song features a lead vocal by Oakey and female backing vocals by Susan Ann Sulley and Joanne Catherall, analogue synthesizers by Jo Callis, Philip Adrian Wright and Ian Burden. Drum machines, sequencing and programming were provided by producer Martin Rushent.

== Background ==
"Open Your Heart" was the third song from the Human League's third studio album Dare (1981). It was chosen by Virgin Records executive Simon Draper to be Dare's taster single, deliberately issued just three weeks in advance of the album. It quickly reached number six on the UK singles chart and raised the band's profile to the highest it had been to that point, and acted as a powerful promotional vehicle for the album. The cover artwork and promotional video was deliberately coordinated with its parent album.
It was the first Human League record sleeve to feature new band member Jo Callis, who co-wrote the song with Philip Oakey and who also wrote the B-side "Non-Stop" with Adrian Wright. In a 2009 interview Callis said, "I had started to work out both those tunes on guitar, playing along to an early drum machine which had about six preset drum patterns, 'Open Your Heart' did translate better on the keyboard and I think we used the same drum machine with the same preset on the original demo which was done in the League's old 8 track studio in Sheffield".

== Release ==
At the time, as a short-lived marketing tactic, the Human League were labeling their singles "Red" or "Blue" to help buyers differentiate between the band's musical styles. "Open Your Heart" was the first to be designated "Blue". When they were asked why, Susan Ann Sulley explained that "Red is for posers, for Spandy (Spandau Ballet) types." Oakey added: "Blue is for ABBA fans."

Smash Hits magazine wrote at the time:

"You have to give the band their due. From being considered no-hopers, they're now Virgin's biggest (financial) hope. This is a number one. It's got everything – strong chorus, instant appeal and dreamboat topping."

The single entered the UK singles charts at no. 21 on 6 October 1981. The band appeared on Top of the Pops (TOTP) the same week to perform the song. The following week it reached its no. 6 peak staying there for two consecutive weeks. The promo video rather than a repeat of the studio appearance was shown on Top of the Pops on 22 October by which time the parent album Dare had been released, entering the UK Albums Chart at no. 2.

== B-side ==
"Non-Stop" is an upbeat instrumental track, written by Jo Callis and Philip Adrian Wright which was also remixed for the 12" release of "Open Your Heart". Unlike previous single B-side "Hard Times", it was not included on the remix album Love and Dancing (1982).

== Promotional video ==
The music video which accompanies the original version of "Open Your Heart" was the first video that the band recorded. Previous Human League (Mk1) releases had been promoted with footage of the band onstage, interspersed with Philip Adrian Wright's slides and visuals. The preceding single "Love Action (I Believe in Love)" had originally been released without a video, but one was later recorded for its US release in 1982.

Virgin Records and Oakey were keen to use the video to promote the future album as much as the current single, so video director Brian Grant borrowed heavily from the album's imagery. The opening scene is a video montage of the portraits of the six band members exactly as they appear on the cover of the album. The band are all dressed and made up in the same style as Dare's photography. The video was shot in a studio on videotape and was mixed and enhanced using then cutting edge analogue video effects. Imagery of Oakey dominated most scenes, cut in with Sulley and Joanne Catherall dancing in slow motion and static shots of Wright, Callis and Ian Burden. The video ends with a lingering shot on the actual cover of the then-unreleased Dare.

== Track listing ==
7" vinyl (Virgin VS453)

1. "Open Your Heart" – 3:53
2. "Non-Stop" – 4:15

12" vinyl (Virgin VS453-12)

1. "Open Your Heart/Non-Stop" – 8:15
2. "Open Your Heart/Non-Stop (Instrumentals)" – 8:41

== Charts ==
Weekly chart performance of "Open Your Heart"
Chart (1982)	Peak position
Belgium (Ultratop 50 Flanders)	12
Ireland (IRMA)	8
Netherlands (Single Top 100)	20
New Zealand (Recorded Music NZ)	43
UK Singles (Official Charts)	6
