= Love Action (I Believe in Love) =

Single by the Human League

from the album Dare
- B-side: "Hard Times"
- Released: 31 July 1981
- Recorded: Genetic Sound (Streatley, Berkshire)
- Genre: Electropop; synth-pop; electro-disco; new wave
- Length: 3:51 (single edit); 4:58 (album version)
- Label: Virgin
- Songwriters: Philip Oakey; Ian Burden
- Producer: Martin Rushent

The Human League singles chronology
"The Sound of the Crowd" (1981)	"Love Action (I Believe in Love)" (1981)	"Open Your Heart" (1981)

Music video
- "Love Action (I Believe in Love)" on YouTube

"Love Action (I Believe in Love)" is a song by the English synth-pop band the Human League, released on 31 July 1981 by Virgin Records as the second single from their third studio album, Dare. It became the band's first top 10 success, peaking at No. 3 on the UK singles chart.

The song was written jointly by lead vocalist Philip Oakey and keyboardist Ian Burden. It features lead vocal by Oakey and analogue synthesizers by Jo Callis, Philip Adrian Wright and Ian Burden. Drum machines, sequencing and programming were provided by producer Martin Rushent and his then engineer and programmer David M. Allen. One of the most notable synth sounds on the recording makes use of the pitch-to-voltage converter and envelope shaper on the Roland System 700 modular synth. Jo Callis' guitar strumming was fed into the synth and used to shape and trigger the sounds, producing an unusual choppy, strumming synth patch.

== Background ==
"Love Action (I Believe in Love)" was the second of three songs from the Human League's third studio album Dare to be released in advance of the album itself in 1981. It was released as a double A-side single with the non-album track "Hard Times". In the US, "Love Action (I Believe in Love)"/"Hard Times" made the dance charts twice: in 1981, the tracks first peaked at number thirty-seven, and one year later, re-entered the dance chart and peaked at number fifty-seven.

The song is a semi-autobiographical account of Philip Oakey's relationships. Oakey often refers to himself and at one point uses the lyric "this is Phil talking." The line was inspired by Iggy Pop's lyric "Jesus, this is Iggy" from his 1977 song "Turn Blue". The Human League had previously supported Iggy Pop live. Oakey borrows from another of his influences and the title "Love Action (I Believe in Love)" is named after the Lou Reed song "I Believe in Love" from his album Rock and Roll Heart (1976). The song contains another cryptic reference to Lou Reed in the lyric, "I believe what the old man said". Oakey, speaking in 1982 said, "no one ever asks me who the old man is... it's Lou (Reed)."

== Release ==
The release of the single was widely advertised in music press in early August 1981 with prominence given also to the B-side "Hard Times" as well as the A-side, and to the fact that a "limited" 12" single would also be made available as "Hard Times/Love Action" in "Disco Mix and Odd Mix" although these names were not used for the actual release. The single was designated 'Red' on the Human League's short-lived self-imposed labelling system of 'Blue' for pop songs and 'Red' for dance tracks.

The single made number 3 on the UK singles chart and placed the Human League in the forefront of media attention. It also renewed Virgin Records' faith in the band and guaranteed the release of the studio album that was to become Dare, just three months later.

"Love Action" was the 34th best-selling single in the UK in 1981. The song was ranked at number 5 among the top ten "Tracks of the Year" for 1981 by NME.

== Legacy ==
The song was sampled in the UK hit single "Believe in Me" from electronic music duo Utah Saints on their self-titled album in 1992 and by George Michael for his politically charged 2002 hit "Shoot the Dog" from his 2004 album Patience.

It was sampled again in 2022 by Betty Boo for her comeback track "Get Me to the Weekend" from her album Boomerang.

The song is featured on the 2006 video game Grand Theft Auto: Vice City Stories and in the series 1, episode 4 of the series Ashes to Ashes in 2008. The song was also used for an episode of Skins in 2009. The song was used in the 1982 teen film The Last American Virgin but has been excised from the DVD release.

The song was covered by Mark Thwaite and Ashton Nyte on the album Gemini Nyte, released in 2018.

== Promotional video ==
Screenshot of Joanne Catherall in promotional video for "Love Action" 1982

Originally the song was released without a promotional video; at the time promotional videos were still rare, very expensive and only very high-profile bands received them. At this point the Human League were not sufficiently marketable to warrant the expense of a video. Instead, video from the band's television appearances to promote the song (mainly an appearance on Top of the Pops) was used.

Following the huge success of "Don't You Want Me", a video for "Love Action" was shot retrospectively for the single's release in America on 11 August 1982. The storyline is loosely based on the 1967 film The Graduate. The opening scene is an exact copy of the church scene from the film with Oakey taking Dustin Hoffman's Benjamin Braddock role. The majority of the video was filmed on a derelict South London council estate while the church scenes were filmed at St Saviour's, Warwick Avenue. Most of the female camera time went to Joanne Catherall, in a wedding dress for the first half. Susan Ann Sulley's scenes mainly involved her having a tantrum and throwing objects around a flat. At one point in the scene, she accidentally managed to score a direct hit on the camera and a production crew member with a flying lamp. She momentarily broke character and cringed as she realizes she had just hit one of the crew.

== Formats and track listings ==
7" vinyl (Virgin VS435)

1. "Love Action (I Believe in Love)" – 3:50
2. "Hard Times" – 4:53

12" vinyl (Virgin VS435-12)

1. "Hard Times/Love Action (I Believe in Love)" – 10:09
2. "Hard Times/Love Action (I Believe in Love) (Instrumentals)" – 11:10

3" CD (Virgin CDT6)

1. "Hard Times" – 4:53
2. "Love Action (I Believe in Love)" – 5:06
3. "Hard Times" (Instrumental) – 5:44
4. "Love Action" (Instrumental) – 5:23

CD released in 1988.

== Charts ==
=== Weekly charts ===
Chart (1981–1982)	Peak position
Australia (Kent Music Report)	12
Ireland (IRMA)	11
New Zealand (Recorded Music NZ)	21
United Kingdom (The Official Charts Company)	3

=== Year-end charts ===
Chart (1982)	Peak position
Australia (Kent Music Report)	87
