= Susan Ann Sulley =

English singer (born 1963)

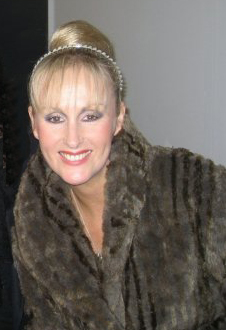
- Sulley in 2007

Background information
- Also known as: Susanne Sulley; Susan Ann Gayle
- Born: 22 March 1963 (age 63); Sheffield, South Yorkshire, England
- Genres: Synth-pop; new wave; electronic
- Occupation: Singer
- Years active: 1980–present
- Labels: Virgin; A&M; EastWest; Papillon
- Member of: The Human League

Susan Ann Sulley (born 22 March 1963), formerly known as Susanne Sulley and Susan Ann Gayle, is an English singer. She is one of the two female vocalists in the synth-pop band the Human League, contributing co-lead vocals on the conflicting duet "Don't You Want Me" with the band's founding member and lead singer Philip Oakey.

Born and raised in Sheffield, England, Sulley was, with friend Joanne Catherall, discovered while schoolgirls aged 17 as customers in the Crazy Daisy Nightclub in Sheffield by Oakey. He asked them to provide full vocals as an experiment.

Sulley is a joint business partner in the band, which still records and performs. Sulley has been a singer all her adult life and has never had any other full-time job. She explains: "Joanne and I weren't ambitious; we didn't want to be in a pop group. We were just two girls at school who wanted to go to university."

== Early life and education ==
Sulley was born in Sheffield, UK, on 22 March 1963. She spent all her early years in the Gleadless suburb of the city. For her final education, she attended the city's Frecheville Comprehensive School from the late 1970s until mid-1981. Her best friend from the age of 13 was fellow lifelong Sheffield resident and Frecheville student Joanne Catherall. By early 1981, she was calling herself 'Susanne Sulley', a familiar amalgamation of her two first names, a nickname by which she had been casually known at school. Whilst still at school in 1980, she had a part-time job in a Sheffield hairdressing salon and a casual summer job selling ice cream at a Sheffield cinema, the only jobs she has had in her life apart from music.

== Sheffield 1980 and "The Crazy Daisy" ==
The Human League had recently split acrimoniously over creative differences, leaving only two of the original four members, Oakey and Adrian Wright, to continue. Crucially, the Human League was contracted to a European tour starting within a week. Already in debt to Virgin Records, Oakey had to recruit new band members in a matter of days for the tour or be sued by the tour's promoters, face bankruptcy, and see the end of the band. Oakey went into Sheffield one evening to recruit a single female backing singer for the tour, needed to replace the original high backing vocals of the now departed Martyn Ware. He noticed Catherall and Sulley dancing together in the Crazy Daisy and now states that they stood out from all the other girls in the club due to their unique dress sense, immaculate make-up, and idiosyncratic but sophisticated dance moves. Without preamble, Oakey asked both girls to join the tour as dancers and incidental vocalists.

Catherall now states that she knew it was a genuine offer, as Oakey was well known in Sheffield; she and Sulley already had tickets to see the Human League on the Doncaster leg of their tour. Catherall and Sulley agreed to the offer immediately, despite having no singing or professional dancing experience.

Because the girls were 17 and 18 years old, the final decision regarding going on the tour lay with their parents. The parents of both the girls were unhappy with the idea and initially refused to give their consent. This was overturned reluctantly when Oakey, complete with his then trademark lop-sided haircut, red lipstick and high heeled shoes, visited both sets of parents to convince them that the girls would come to no harm. Catherall and Sulley's school also agreed to the absence, as it was thought visiting Europe would be educational.

The first European tour of the Human League got underway with the two young recruits assigned to dancing and incidental vocal duties. The girls at this stage were just guests in the group on a salary of £30 a week. Although the tour was a success, the crowds were largely hostile to Catherall and Sulley, as fans had bought tickets for the original all male line-up. Catherall recalls dodging several beer cans thrown at her during the tour and was often heckled. During the tour, Oakey had experimented with the girls singing on a number of the original tracks and was impressed with the results; he was also impressed with the girls' professionalism and determination during the tour.

== 1981: Dare and "Don't You Want Me" ==
The group recorded Dare, their most commercially successful album to date, in 1981. The release of the album also coincided with a steep rise in the use of music videos and the launch of MTV. In the video for "Don't You Want Me", released in November as the fourth single from the album, Sulley plays a successful actress walking out on her bitter Svengali lover (played by Oakey), who laments her success and departure. Set on a "film shoot" on a wet winter night, Sulley sings directly to the camera whilst walking through the atmospheric set, immaculately made up and wearing a distinctive trench coat. The single, aided by the classic video, was a commercial breakthrough for the group, going to number one in the charts in both the UK and the US. Sulley was still at school when Dare was recorded and often jokes that she "has never had a proper job in her life".

== The remaining 1980s ==
The international stardom that Dare brought was short-lived. The group took three years to release their next full album, 1984's Hysteria. A stop-gap EP, Fascination!, was issued in America in 1983. From these releases, the group had a number of top-ten singles in the UK and the US, including "(Keep Feeling) Fascination" and "Mirror Man", which both charted at number two in the UK. The single "Human" from Crash was the group's last real commercial success of the decade, charting at number one in the US and number eight in the UK. From then, the group's mainstream popularity plunged, with subsequent releases not even breaking the top forty. It also was about 1986 that she stopped calling herself Susanne, opting for the more formal Susan.

The mid-to-late 1980s were not a particularly happy time for Sulley, as she had to deal with the personal problems unexpected international fame brought her. Also, internal disputes and pressure to produce more hits caused conflict, and eventually splits, within the Human League. When asked in late 1995 to describe that period, Sulley said: "I hated the 1980s; it was horrible … absolutely all of it."

== The 1990s ==
In 1990, the band released their last album for Virgin Records, Romantic?, which included the minor hit single "Heart Like a Wheel". The Romantic? album did not re-capture the group's huge commercial success of 1981; with the album's second single "Soundtrack To A Generation" flopping, Virgin chose not to renew the band's recording contract. During the recording of Romantic?, Sulley suffered the first of two nervous breakdowns, exacerbated by a disastrous short-lived marriage. Although disheartened, the group remained together and persevered with new material. The Human League made a surprise comeback in 1994, now signed to East West Records, with the single "Tell Me When" giving them their first major hit since 1986's "Human" and the accompanying album Octopus going Gold.

Like Catherall before her, Sulley had a relationship with Oakey.

=== "One Man in My Heart" ===
In 1995, the Octopus contained single with "One Man in My Heart". It was a ballad sung by Sulley on lead vocals, with Oakey and Catherall providing supporting vocals. The accompanying video was set in a Parisian café. Although only moderately successful (it reached number thirteen in the UK charts), it was described years later in The Guardian as "one of the best love songs of the 1990s", and has been remixed and re-released a number of times since.

== 2000 to the present ==
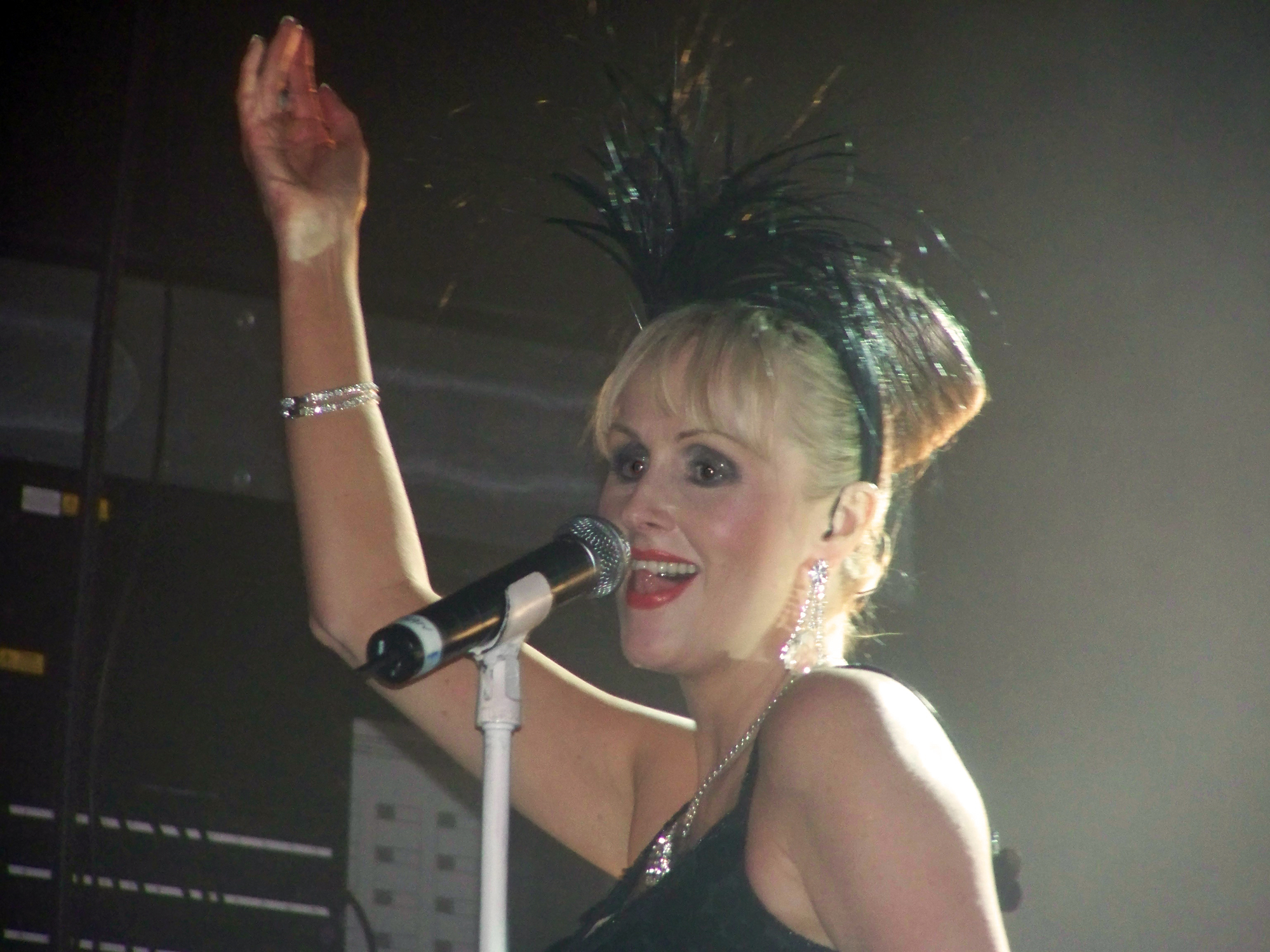
Sulley, Sheffield, April 2008

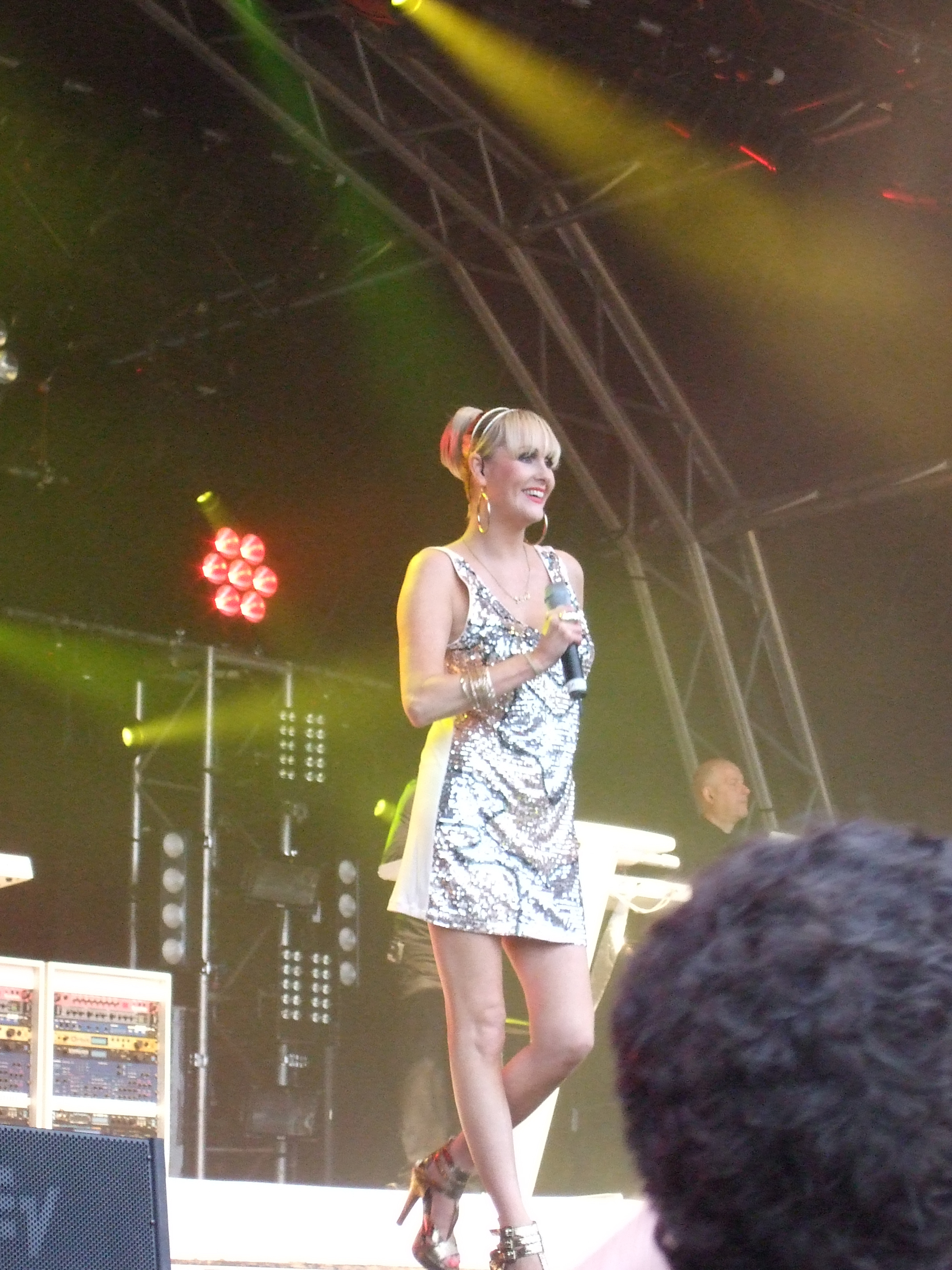
Sulley, 2010

The group regularly play to sell-out venues worldwide. In 2006, they played to an audience of 18,000 at the Hollywood Bowl, and appeared on the network US television show Jimmy Kimmel Live!. In late 2006, the Human League completed another tour of the UK and Europe, again with many venues sold out. In a 2007 interview, Sulley stated that the main effort of the Human League in the immediate future was the recording of new material, with the possibility of a new studio album, while continuing to play live at a variety of venues both in the UK and internationally.

Sulley, when asked (in 2004) to pick the highlight of her career, said: "I think it's still happening. I think the fact we're still doing it now. After all these years – I'm 41 now, and really, I shouldn't be in a pop group any more, but I am and it's still my job! I wake up in the morning and I haven't got to go to a nine-to-five. I've got this life and I'm very, very lucky!

== Influence ==
Victoria Beckham of the Spice Girls has stated that it was Sulley who inspired her to enter pop music.

== Film and television ==
- 1999 Hunting Venus (Buffalo Films, D. Martin Clunes) – Herself
- 2007 VH1 – Presenter

== Professional name chronology ==
Although her birth name is Susan Ann Sulley, she has been known professionally by a number of variants throughout her career; the table below shows the chronology. Because she rarely corrects journalists using an incorrect name, it is possible to find any of these currently in use in the media.

1963–1981	Susan Ann Sulley
1981–1986	Susanne Sulley
1986–2001	Susan Ann Sulley
2001–2007	Susan Ann Gayle
2007–present	Susan Ann Sulley

^{Note: Her middle name can be spelled either Ann or Anne by the media and is only used professionally}

== Awards ==
- 1982 BRIT Awards – (as 'the Human League') – 'Best British Breakthrough Act'
- 2004 Q Awards – (as 'the Human League') – 'The Q Innovation in Sound Award'
- Nominated for Grammy Award in 1982 for Best International Act (as 'the Human League')
