= Ian Burden =

English musician

- Born: Ian Charles Burden; 24 December 1957 (age 67)
- Origin: Newark-on-Trent, Nottinghamshire, England
- Genres: Synth-pop, new wave, electronic
- Occupation(s): Songwriter, musician
- Instrument(s): Keyboards, bass, guitar
- Years active: 1980–1987 (Human League); 1990–present (solo)
- Labels: Virgin, A&M
- Website: ianburden.uk

Ian Charles Burden (born 24 December 1957) is an English musician who played keyboards and bass guitar with the Human League, initially as a session musician, and later full-time, between 1981 and 1987.

== Early life ==
Burden attended The King's School in Peterborough as a boarding pupil, where he played in several amateur bands.

== Career ==
Formerly of Sheffield band Graph, Burden was employed as a session keyboard player for the Human League's October 1980 tour, covering for Martyn Ware and Ian Craig Marsh's keyboards after their departure. In March 1981 he returned to the band full-time, and would co-write much of their early 1980s material. He left the band in 1987.

Burden recorded a solo album, Loot, in 1990.

In 1995, Burden released a CD through Inertia Records entitled A Swim in the Ocean. This was a collaboration with Human League session player and contributor Russell Dennett. The band called themselves Deep Down Crazy, and consisted of Dan Boulton on vocals, Chris Broadhead on drums, Russell Dennett on guitar/keyboards/vocals and Burden on bass/keyboards. The recording took place at The Stockyard in Leicestershire.

Burden played bass guitar on the 2006 debut eponymous release for the Tenth Stage, a Melbourne-based band, and also on their second album, Grand Guignol. The bass guitar used on these recordings (a Fender Telecaster Bass) was the same one he used to record "I Love You Too Much" and "(Keep Feeling) Fascination" (although in the Fascination video he is playing its technical direct successor, the Fender Precision Bass). He played an Ibanez Musician Bass on "Mirror Man" and "The Lebanon", and in some live performances (including their Top of the Pops performance of "Fascination").

Burden also contributed bass guitar to Parralox's State of Decay album, released in Germany in 2009.

In 2018, Burden released the second solo album Hey Hey Ho Hum .

== Awards ==
- 1982 Brit Awards – (with the Human League) – 'Best British Breakthrough Act'
