= Alcazar discography =

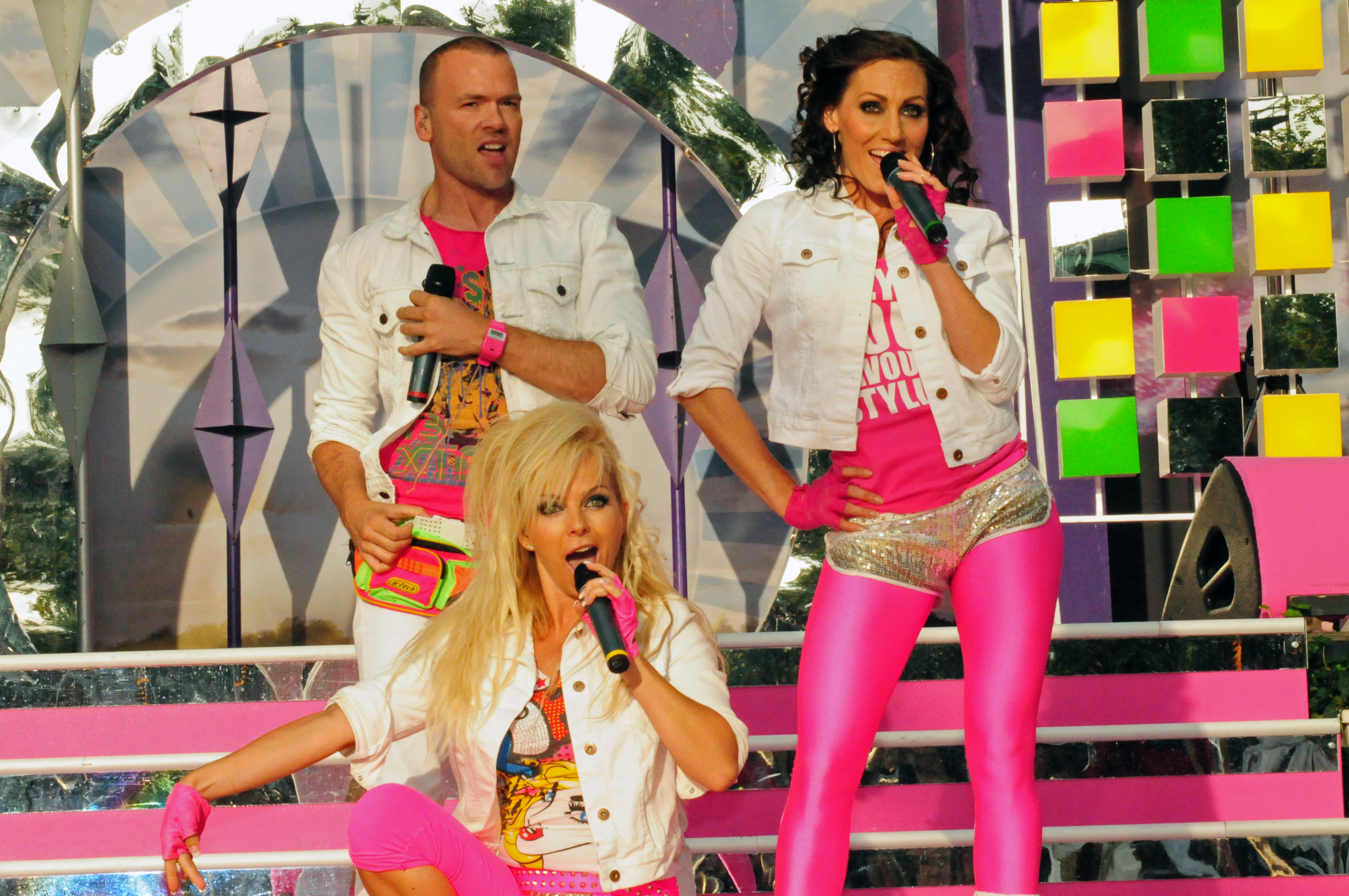
- Studio albums: 3
- Extended plays: 1
- Singles: 23
- B-sides: 5
- Music videos: 12
- Remix Albums: 1
- Tours: 2

This is the discography of Swedish dance/pop group Alcazar, who have released three studio albums on Sony BMG, one compilation and one EP album

Alcazar rose to fame with their debut album, Casino, and its third single, "Crying at the Discoteque". It produced a chain of singles including the internationally successful "Sexual Guarantee", and "Don't You Want Me". After Casino and an unsuccessful attempt to win Melodifestivalen 2003 with the song "Not a Sinner Nor a Saint", they released their second studio album, Alcazarized, which was commercially successful and produced a few international singles, such as "Not a Sinner Nor a Saint", "Ménage à Trois" and "This Is the World We Live In".

== Albums ==
=== Studio albums ===
Title	Details	Peak chart positions				
Title	Details	SWE	BEL (FL)	GER	NLD	SWI
Casino	Released: 18 October 2000; Label: RCA/Sony BMG; Format: CD, cassette	40	—	34	28	—
Alcazarized	Released: 6 May 2003; Label: RCA/Sony BMG; Format: CD, cassette	2	95	46	—	43
Disco Defenders	Released: 11 March 2009; Label: Universal Records; Format: CD, digital download	4	—	—	—	—
"—" denotes a recording that did not chart or was not released in that territory.

=== Compilation albums ===
Title	Details	Peak chart positions	Certifications
Title	Details	SWE	Certifications
Dancefloor Deluxe	Released: 25 August 2004; Label: Sony BMG; Format: CD, digital download	3	GLF: Gold
Disco Defenders: Greatest Hits	Released: 24 July 2015; Label: Universal Music; Format: CD, digital download	—	
"—" denotes a recording that did not chart or was not released in that territory.

=== Live albums ===
Title	Details
A Tribute to ABBA	Release date: 2005; Label: Sony BMG; Formats: CD, music download

== Singles ==
Title	Year	Peak chart positions										Certifications	Album
Title	Year	SWE	AUS	DEN	FRA	GER	ITA	NLD	NOR	SWI	UK	Certifications	Album
"Shine On"	1999	—	—	—	—	—	—	—	—	—	—		Casino
"Crying at the Discoteque"	2000	29	14	—	64	3	4	14	—	7	13	BPI: Silver; BVMI: Gold; IFPI SWI: Gold	Casino
"Ritmo Del Amor"	2000	—	—	—	—	—	—	—	—	—	—		Casino
"Sexual Guarantee"	2001	28	—	—	—	72	17	30	—	46	30		Casino
"Don't You Want Me"	2002	30	37	—	—	74	28	83	—	76	—		Casino
"Not a Sinner Nor a Saint"	2003	1	—	—	—	—	—	—	—	—	—	GLF: Gold	Alcazarized
"Ménage à Trois"	2003	19	—	—	—	—	24	—	—	—	—		Alcazarized
"Someday"	2003	31	—	—	—	—	—	—	—	—	—		Alcazarized
"Love Life"	2003	10	—	—	—	—	—	—	—	—	—		Alcazarized
"This Is the World We Live In"	2004	3	31	14	—	30	11	75	16	30	15	GLF: Gold	Alcazarized
"Physical"	2004	—	—	—	—	59	—	—	—	91	—		Alcazarized
"Here I Am"	2004	41	—	—	—	—	—	—	—	—	—	GLF: Gold	Dancefloor Deluxe
"Alcastar"	2005	1	—	—	—	—	—	—	—	—	—	GLF: Gold	Dancefloor Deluxe
"Start the Fire"	2005	10	—	—	—	62	—	—	—	87	—		Dancefloor Deluxe
"We Keep on Rockin'"	2008	4	—	—	—	—	—	—	—	—	—	GLF: Gold	Disco Defenders
"Inhibitions"	2008	10	—	—	—	—	—	—	—	—	—		Disco Defenders
"Stay the Night"	2009	2	—	—	—	—	—	—	—	—	—	GLF: Gold	Disco Defenders
"Burning"	2009	—	—	—	—	—	—	—	—	—	—		Disco Defenders
"From Brazil with Love"	2009	—	—	—	—	—	—	—	—	—	—		Disco Defenders
"Last Christmas"	2009	—	—	—	—	—	—	—	—	—	—		Disco Defenders: Special Edition
"Headlines"	2010	10	—	—	—	—	—	—	—	—	—		Non-album single
"Blame It on the Disco"	2014	10	—	—	—	—	—	—	—	—	—	GLF: Platinum	Disco Defenders: Greatest Hits
"Good Lovin'"	2014	—	—	—	—	—	—	—	—	—	—		Non-album single
"Young Guns (Go for It)"	2015	—	—	—	—	—	—	—	—	—	—		Disco Defenders: Greatest Hits
"In the Name of Love"	2018	—	—	—	—	—	—	—	—	—	—		Non-album single
"—" denotes a recording that did not chart or was not released in that territory.

== Music videos ==
Year	Title	Director(s)
1999	"Shine On"	
2001	"Crying at the Discoteque"	
2001	"Sexual Guarantee"	
2002	"Don't You Want Me"	
2003	"Ménage à Trois"	
2003	"Someday"	
2004	"This Is the World We Live In"	
2004	"Physical"	
2005	"Start the Fire"	
2008	"We Keep on Rockin'"	
2009	"Burning"	
2009	"Last Christmas"	
2011	"Feel 4 U" (Dream Beats featuring Alcazar)	Johannes Helje
2015	"Young Guns (Go for It)"	

== B-sides ==
Year	Song	A-side
2000	"Tears of a Clone"	"Ritmo Del Amor"
2005	"Glamourama"	"Start the Fire"
2005	"Nothing But the Video On"	"Start the Fire"
2009	"One Two Three Four"	"Last Christmas"
