= Disco Defenders =

Studio album by Alcazar
- Released: 11 March 2009
- Recorded: 2008–2009
- Genre: Europop; nu-disco
- Length: 93:00
- Label: Love No Limit; Universal
- Producer: Anders Hansson; Johan Fjellstrom; Joakim Udd; Felix Persson; Marta Grauers; OZGO; Johan Rohr; Thomas Thornholm; Figge

Alcazar chronology
A Tribute to ABBA (2005)	Disco Defenders (2009)	Disco Defenders: Greatest Hits (2015)

Singles from Disco Defenders
- 1. "We Keep on Rockin'" Released: 29 April 2008; 2. "Inhibitions" Released: 16 June 2008; 3. "Stay the Night" Released: 3 March 2009; 4. "Burning" Released: 16 April 2009; 5. "From Brazil with Love" Released: 24 July 2009; 6. "Last Christmas" Released: 20 November 2009

Professional ratings
Review scores
Source	Rating
Teentoday.co.uk	4/5 stars

Disco Defenders is Alcazar's third and final studio album. It was released on 11 March 2009 in Sweden, and internationally in May 2009. The album features two discs: "Now" (new Alcazar songs) and "Then" (featuring some of their older hits). The writers of the new songs include Anders Hansson, Pet Shop Boys, Danny Saucedo and Oscar Görres.

The album also includes a cover of the 1980 disco hit "Funkytown" by Lipps Inc.

== Track listings ==
=== Standard edition ===
CD 1 – Now
No.	Title	Writer(s)	Length
1.	"We Keep on Rockin'"	A. Hansson	3:50
2.	"Burning"	Joakim Udd, Karl Euren, Johan Fjellstrom	3:05
3.	"Stay the Night"	A. Hansson, M. Sanden, T. Merkel, A. Lundstedt, L. Hedlund	3:00
4.	"From Brazil with Love"	Oscar Görres, Danny Saucedo	3:41
5.	"Inhibitions"	A. Hansson, N. Chinn	3:03
6.	"Harlem Nights"	A. Hansson, S. Vaughn	4:06
7.	"Baby"	N. Tennant, C. Lowe	3:54
8.	"Jump Straight into the Fire"	A. Hansson, F. Persson, M. Grauers, Anton Malmberg Hard af Segerstad	3:18
9.	"My My Me and Mine"	A. Hansson, S. Vaughn, T. Merkel, A. Lundstedt, L. Hedlund	3:42
10.	"Funkytown"	Steven Greenberg	3:38
11.	"Put the Top Down"	Fredrik Figge Bostrom, Jackie Kavan	3:39
12.	"Thank You"	Thomas Thornholm, Danne Attlerud, Figge Bostrom	2:59
13.	"Stay the Night" (FL Club Mix)	A. Hansson, M. Sanden, T. Merkel, A. Lundstedt, L. Hedlund	3:59
Total length:			46:00

German and Polish edition
No.	Title	Writer(s)	Length
14.	"Burning" (music video)	Joakim Udd, Karl Euren, Johan Fjellstrom	3:09
15.	"We Keep on Rockin'" (music video)	A. Hansson	3:40

CD 2 – Then
No.	Title	Length
1.	"This Is the World We Live In"	3:33
2.	"Crying at the Discoteque"	3:49
3.	"Ménage à Trois"	3:47
4.	"Sexual Guarantee"	3:33
5.	"Don't You Want Me"	3:31
6.	"Start the Fire"	3:15
7.	"Shine On"	3:29
8.	"Not a Sinner Nor a Saint"	2:59
9.	"Physical"	3:27
10.	"Ritmo Del Amor"	3:17
11.	"Alcastar"	3:03
12.	"Love Life"	3:52
13.	"Someday"	4:03
Total length:		45:44

=== Special edition ===
This version is a re-release published the 18 November 2009 and includes two new tracks, "One Two Three Four" and "Last Christmas" instead of "Jump Straight into the Fire" and "Put the Top Down". This release has also a new cover.

CD 1 – Now
No.	Title	Writer(s)	Length
1.	"We Keep on Rockin'" (extended version)	A. Hansson	3:40
2.	"Burning"	Joakim Udd, Karl Euren, Johan Fjellstrom	3:05
3.	"Stay the Night"	A. Hansson, M. Sanden, T. Merkel, A. Lundstedt, L. Hedlund	3:00
4.	"From Brazil with Love"	Oscar Görres, Danny Saucedo	3:41
5.	"Inhibitions"	A. Hansson, N. Chinn	3:03
6.	"Harlem Nights"	A. Hansson, S. Vaughn	4:06
7.	"Baby"	N. Tennant, C. Lowe	3:54
8.	"One Two Three Four"		3:08
9.	"My My Me and Mine"	A. Hansson, S. Vaughn, T. Merkel, A. Lundstedt, L. Hedlund	3:42
10.	"Funkytown"	Steven Greenberg	3:38
11.	"Thank You"	Thomas Thornholm, Danne Attlerud, Figge Bostrom	2:59
12.	"Last Christmas"	George Michael	3:34
13.	"Stay the Night" (FL Club Mix)	A. Hansson, M. Sanden, T. Merkel, A. Lundstedt, L. Hedlund	3:59
Total length:			45:45

CD 2 – Then
No.	Title	Length
1.	"This Is the World We Live In"	3:33
2.	"Crying at the Discoteque"	3:49
3.	"Ménage à Trois"	3:47
4.	"Sexual Guarantee"	3:33
5.	"Don't You Want Me"	3:31
6.	"Start the Fire"	3:15
7.	"Shine On"	3:29
8.	"Not a Sinner Nor a Saint"	2:59
9.	"Physical"	3:27
10.	"Ritmo Del Amor"	3:17
11.	"Alcastar"	3:03
12.	"Love Life"	3:52
13.	"Someday"	4:03
Total length:		45:44

== Charts ==
Chart performance for Disco Defenders
Chart (2009)	Peak position
Swedish Albums (Sverigetopplistan)	4

== Release history ==
Release history for Disco Defenders
Region	Date	Edition	Label
Sweden	11 March 2009	First	Love No Limit; Universal
Germany	22 May 2009	First	Universal
Poland	4 September 2009	First	Magic; Universal
Sweden	18 November 2009	Second	Universal
Worldwide	27 July 2021	First, digital download, streaming	Universal
