= Dancefloor Deluxe =

Compilation album by Alcazar
- Released: August 25, 2004
- Recorded: 1999–2004
- Genre: Pop, dance, electronica
- Length: 60:40
- Label: BMG

Alcazar chronology
Alcazarized (2003)	Dancefloor Deluxe (2004)	A Tribute to ABBA (2005)

Singles from Dancefloor Deluxe
- 1. "Here I Am" Released: December 25, 2004; 2. "Start the Fire" Released: August 15, 2005

Dancefloor Deluxe is the third album and the first compilation album by Swedish eurodance group Alcazar. It was released in Sweden on August 25, 2004.

== Track list ==
=== Standard edition 2004 ===
CD1 - Deluxe
No.	Title	Writer(s)	Length
1.	"This Is the World We Live In"	A. Banks, A. Bhagavan, B.H. Edwards, M. Rutherford, Nile Rodgers, P. Collins, N. Von der Burg	3:35
2.	"Physical"	A. Bhagavan, G. Chandler, J. Chambers, J. Helms, L. Henshall, N. Von der Burg	3:29
3.	"Start the Fire"	Billy Joel, Ken Gold, Michael Denne	3:17
4.	"Love Life"	Chris Lowe, Neil Tennant	3:54
5.	"Someday" (Unreleased Single Mix)	J. Kinde, Orup, S. Olsson	4:27
6.	"Ménage à Trois"	G. Samuelsson, L. Robbins, M. Lundh, Q. Starkie	3:49
7.	"Not a Sinner Nor a Saint"	B. Ljunggren, L. Ahlin, T. Lydell	3:02
8.	"Don't You Want Me" (Almighty Radio Edit)	Francis wright, Jo Callis, Philip Oakey	3:28
9.	"Sexual Guarantee"	Alexander Bard, Anders Hansson, Bernard Edwards, Johan Strandkvist, Nile Rodgers	3:35
10.	"Ritmo Del Amor" (Radio Edit)	Alexander Bard, Anders Wollbeck	3:19
11.	"Crying at the Discoteque"	Alexander bard, Anders Hansson, Anders Wollbeck, Bernard Edwards, Michael Goulos, Nile Rodgers	3:52
12.	"Shine On"	Alexander Bard, Anders Hansson	3:32
Total length:			43:25

CD2 - Dancefloor (Mixed)
No.	Title	Writer(s)	Length
1.	"Intro / Dancefoor Deluxe"		0:49
2.	"This is the world we live in" (Soundfactory Club Anthem)	A. Banks, A. Bhagavan, B.H. Edwards, M. Rutherford, Nile Rodgers, P. Collins, N. Von der Burg	3:48
3.	"Start the Fire" (Original Version)	Billy Joel, Ken Gold, Michael Denne	3:37
4.	"Sexual Guarantee" (Almighty Remix)	Alexander Bard, Anders Hansson, Bernard Edwards, Johan Strandkvist, Nile Rodgers	3:30
5.	"Paradise" (FL's Reinvention Club Mix)	Alexander Bard, Anders Hansson, Clayton, Johan Strandkvist, Sigidi	3:14
6.	"Someday" (Studio 54 Revival Remix)	J. Kinde, Orup, S. Olsson	3:55
7.	"Mènage à trois" (J. Pipe Smooth Club Edit)	G. Samuelsson, L. Robbins, M. Lundh, Q. Starkie	3:56
8.	"Shine On" (Suezia Remix Radio Edit)	Alexander Bard, Anders Hansson	2:51
9.	"Don't You Want Me" (Wild Cowboys Blonde Radio Mix)	Francis wright, Jo Callis, Philip Oakey	4:23
10.	"Physical" (Original Version)	A. Bhagavan, G. Chandler, J. Chambers, J. Helms, L. Henshall, N. Von der Burg	3:26
11.	"Not a Sinner, Nor a Saint" (Disco Club Mix)	B. Ljunggren, L. Ahlin, T. Lydell	3:45
12.	"Save My Pride" (Original Edit)	Alexander Bard, Anders Hansson, Johan Strandkvist	3:51
13.	"Dance with the DJ" (Original Edit)	Anders Hansson, Zero Th!nk-ink	3:05
14.	"Love Life" (FL's Rebirth Club Mix)	Chris Lowe, Neil Tennant	4:01
15.	"Crying at the Discoteque" (Special Extended Show Version)	Alexander Bard, Anders Hansson, Anders Wollbeck, Bernard Edwards, Michael Goulos, Nile Rodgers	4:42
Total length:			53:01

=== Single disc edition 2005 ===
No.	Title	Writer(s)	Length
1.	"This Is the World We Live In"	A. Banks, A. Bhagavan, B.H. Edwards, M. Rutherford, Nile Rodgers, P. Collins, N. Von der Burg	03:35
2.	"Alcastar"	Johan Fransson, Anders Hansson, Tim Larsson, Tobias Lundgren, Niklas Edberger	3:06
3.	"Physical"	A. Bhagavan, G. Chandler, J. Chambers, J. Helms, L. Henshall, N. Von der Burg	3:30
4.	"Here I Am" (English Single Version)	J. Röhr, M. Sandén	4:40
5.	"Start the Fire" (Unreleased)	Billy Joel, Ken Gold, Michael Denne	3:17
6.	"Love Life"	Chris Lowe, Neil Tennant	3:54
7.	"Someday" (Unreleased Single Mix)	J. Kinde, Orup, S. Olsson	4:28
8.	"Ménage à Trois"	G. Samuelson, M. Lundh, Q. Starkie. L. Robbins	3:49
9.	"Not a Sinner Nor a Saint"	B. Ljunggren, L. Ahlin, T. Lydell	3:02
10.	"Don't You Want Me" (Almighty Radio Edit)	Francis wright, Jo Callis, Philip Oakey	3:28
11.	"Sexual Guarantee"	Alexander Bard, Anders Hansson, Bernard Edwards, Johan Strandkvist, Nile Rodgers	3:35
12.	"Ritmo Del Amor" (Radio edit)	Alexander Bard, Anders Wollbeck	3:19
13.	"Crying at the Discoteque"	Alexander bard, Anders Hansson, Anders Wollbeck, Bernard Edwards, Michael Goulos, Nile Rodgers	3:52
14.	"Shine On"	Alexander Bard, Anders Hansson	3:33
Total length:			51:16

== Charts ==
Chart (2004)	Peak position
Swedish Albums (Sverigetopplistan)	3
