= Andreas Lundstedt =

Swedish musician (born 1972)

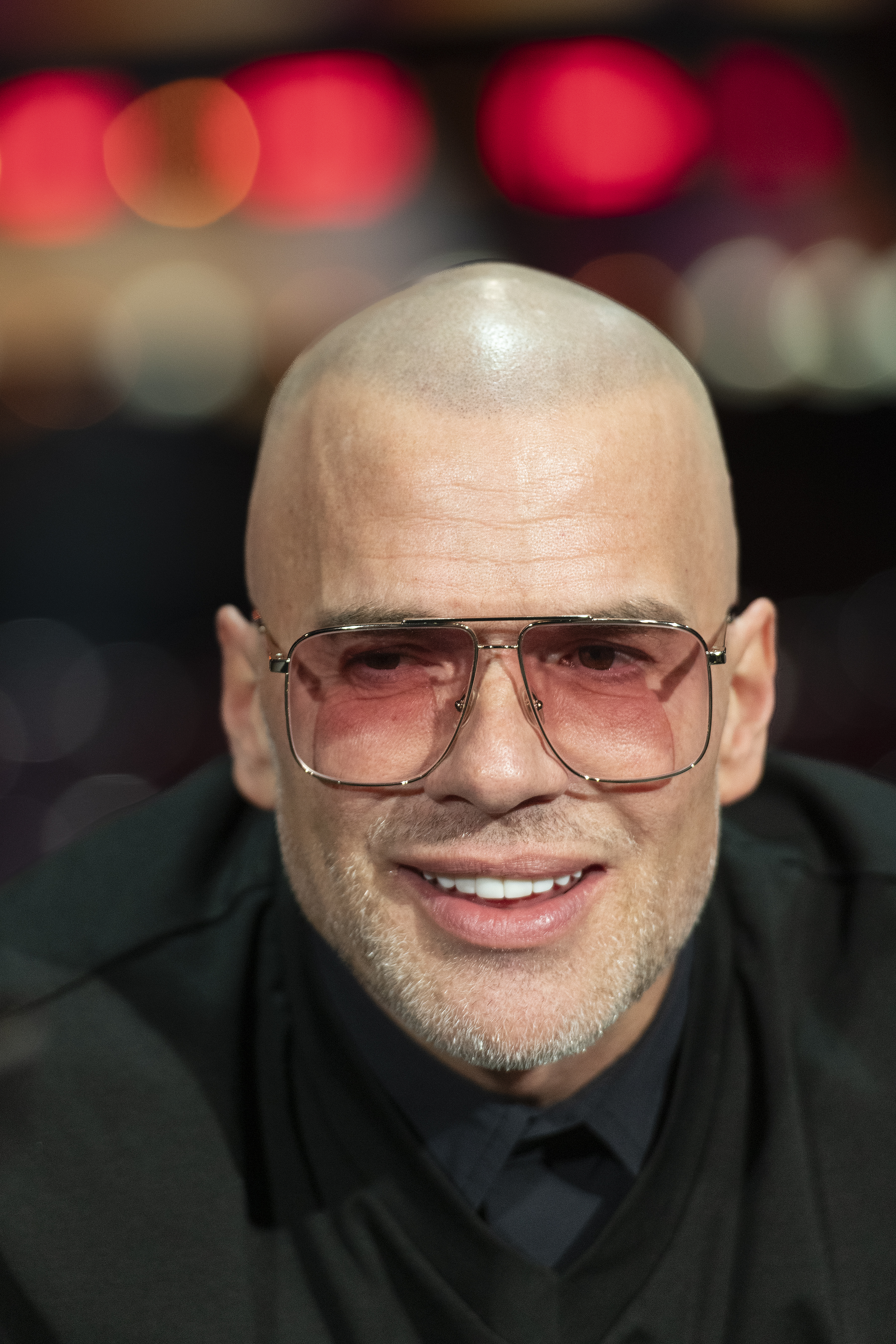

Background information
- Born: Björn Helge Andreas Lundstedt; 20 May 1972 (age 54); Uppsala, Sweden
- Genres: Europop, nu-disco
- Occupations: Singer, musician, choreographer, songwriter
- Instrument: Vocals
- Years active: 1996–present
- Website: Official web site (in Swedish); Official fan site

Björn Helge Andreas Lundstedt (born 20 May 1972) is a Swedish singer, best known as a member of the pop-dance group Alcazar.

== Biography ==
Born in Uppsala, Sweden, since childhood, Lundstedt had wanted to be a singer. At the age of five, he took part in a talent competition for children and achieved second place. By the age of fifteen, he appeared regularly on television and in shows as a member of the band Stage Four. The group consisted of four of the now most famous singers in Sweden; Lundstedt himself, Peter Jöback, Lisa Nilsson and Lizette Pålsson.

In 1998, Lundstedt was the founding member of Alcazar. They made their European breakthrough with the hit single "Crying at the Discoteque". After this success, Alcazar had several more hit singles. One of them was "This is The World We Live In" (2004). Alcazar reunited in 2007 after a two-year break and today consists of Tess Merkel, Lina Hedlund and Lundstedt.

Lundstedt released one album and four singles in the years 1996–1997, and in 2006 he released a new single, "Lovegun"/"Nightfever", which includes a new song as well as a cover of the Bee Gees hit song "Night Fever". He released two more singles, "Move" in 2007 and "Aldrig Aldrig" in 2012.

In addition to his pop music career, he has had roles in the musicals Grease and Chicago. In autumn 2005 and spring 2006 Lundstedt starred as Tony Manero in the musical Saturday Night Fever in Stockholm, Sweden, for which he received favourable press reviews. He also works as a choreographer and has choreographed many of Alcazar's dance moves.

Lundstedt is openly gay and was involved in a relationship with a former member of Alcazar, Magnus Carlsson.

In December 2007, Andreas confirmed the rumours that he is HIV positive.

== Eurovision Song Contest ==
Lundstedt has participated in Sweden's Melodifestivalen ten times. Five times as a solo artist with the song "Driver Dagg Faller Regn" in 1996, "Jag Saknar Dig, Jag Saknar Dig" in 1997, "Move" in 2007, "Aldrig Aldrig" in 2012 and "Vicious" in 2025; and five times as a member of Alcazar with the songs "Not a Sinner, Nor a Saint" in 2003, "Alcastar" in 2005, "Stay the Night" in 2009, "Headlines" in 2010 and "Blame It on the Disco" in 2014. He was also one of the members of Six4one, which represented Switzerland at the Eurovision Song Contest 2006 with the song "If We All Give a Little". Six4one released one album in 2006. In this album, the members sing two songs each, and five together.

Lundstedt and his song "Move" did not make it through from the semifinal of Melodifestivalen 2007.

Lundstedt with Alcazar won the first direct place to the final of Sweden's Melodifestivalen 2009 with the song "Stay the Night". On 8 January 2010 SVT announced that the group would perform at Melodifestivalen 2010 in Gothenburg with the new song "Headlines". They finished in fourth place in the third semi-final, advancing them to the 'Andra Chansen' Second Chance Round. There they were beaten by Jessica Andersson in the first round of voting. Lundstedt was a member of the Swedish jury in the Eurovision Song Contest 2010.

Andreas Lundstedt returned to Melodifestivalen in its 2012 edition with his song "Aldrig Aldrig"("Never Never"). He competed in the 2nd Semi-final reaching the 7th place with Sonja Alden receiving the 6th place and Mimi Oh coming last that evening. Consequently, he failed to reach the final at Globen, Stockholm.

Lundstedt was the male vocalist in Alcazar along with the female vocalists Merkel and Hedlund until they announced the band would go on indefinite hiatus during Stockholm Pride 2011.

For Eurovision 2014, Alcazar was competing again in Melodifestivalen to represent Sweden. With their song "Blame It on the Disco" they reached the third place in the Melodifestivalen final.

== Discography ==
=== Albums ===
List of albums, with selected details
Title	Details
Andreas Lundstedt	Released: 1996; Label: Stockholm Records (533 804-2); Format: CD

=== Extended plays ===
List of EPs, with selected details
Title	Details
Så Mycket Bättre 2024 - Tolkningarna	Released: November 2025; Label: Emperial AB

=== Charted singles ===
Title	Year	Peak chart positions	Album
Title	Year	SWE	Album
"Driver Dagg Faller Regn"	1996	11	Andreas Lundstedt
"Hey-Ya Hey-Ya"	1996	21	Andreas Lundstedt
"Jag Saknar Dig, Jag Saknar Dig"	1997	16	Non-album singles
"Lovegun" / "Nightfever"	2006	1	Non-album singles
"Move"	2007	34	Non-album singles
"Vicious"	2025	28	Non-album singles

Awards and achievements
Preceded by Vanilla Ninja with "Cool Vibes"	Switzerland in the Eurovision Song Contest (as part of six4one); 2006	Succeeded by DJ Bobo with "Vampires Are Alive"
