= Love Life (song) =

2003 single by Alcazar

Single by Alcazar

from the album Alcazarized
- Released: 9 October 2003
- Genre: Pop
- Length: 3:53
- Label: BMG; RCA Records
- Songwriter(s): Neil Tennant; Chris Lowe
- Producer(s): Anders Wollbeck; Mattias Lindblom

Alcazar singles chronology
| "Someday" (2003) | "Love Life" (2003) | "This Is the World We Live In" (2004) |

Audio video
- "Love Life" on YouTube

"Love Life" is a song written by English synth-pop duo Pet Shop Boys and first released by the Swedish band Alcazar, as the fourth single from their second album, Alcazarized (2003). The song reached the top 10 in Sweden. Pet Shop Boys released their own version for Record Store Day in 2010.

== Background and composition ==
Neil Tennant and Chris Lowe wrote and recorded "Love Life" in 2001 but did not release it at that time. The song was originally titled "Can I Be the One?", and the lyrics are written in the form of a personal advertisement from someone seeking companionship.

== Alcazar version ==
In 2002, Alcazar played a concert at the London Astoria and met Tennant and Lowe, who were fans of the song "Crying at the Discoteque" (2000). Andreas Lundstedt later contacted the duo about contributing a song to the next Alcazar album, and Pet Shop Boys sent him the demo of "Love Life". Alcazarized was released in May 2003.

"Love Life" was released as a single in Sweden in October 2003 to promote Alcazar's fall club tour. The band performed the song on several Swedish television shows, including Fame Factory. The single was produced by Mattias Lindblom and Anders Wollbeck and included an extended version and a club mix. It entered the Swedish record chart at number 20 on 24 October and peaked at number 10 the following week, spending 10 weeks in the top 100.

=== Track listing ===
CD single
| No. | Title | Length |
|---|---|---|
| 1. | "Love Life" | 3:54 |
| 2. | "Love Life" (extended version) | 6:35 |
| 3. | "Love Life" (FL Rebirth club mix) | 9:22 |

=== Personnel ===
Credits adapted from the liner notes of "Love Life".

Alcazar

- Andreas Lundstedt
- Annikafiore Kjærgaard
- Magnus Carlsson
- Tess Merkel

Additional musicians

- Anders Wollbeck – keyboards, programming, guitars

Technical personnel

- Anders Wollbeck – production, mixing
- Mattias Lindblom – production, mixing
- Bjorn Engelmann – mastering

Artwork

- Jon Bergsman/F.R.I. – sleeve design
- Mikeadelica (Mikael Gustafsson) – photography

=== Chart performance ===
Weekly chart performance for "Love Life"
| Chart (2003) | Peak position |
|---|---|
| Sweden (Sverigetopplistan) | 10 |

== Pet Shop Boys version ==
"Love Life"

Single by Pet Shop Boys
- B-side: "A Powerful Friend"
- Released: 17 April 2010
- Recorded: 2001
- Genre: Pop
- Length: 3:45
- Label: Parlophone
- Songwriter(s): Neil Tennant; Chris Lowe
- Producer(s): Pet Shop Boys

Pet Shop Boys singles chronology
| "Beautiful People" (2009) | "Love Life" (2010) | "Together" (2010) |

Pet Shop Boys released their own version of "Love Life" as a 7-inch single for Record Store Day on 17 April 2010. It was available only in the UK and limited to 1,000 copies. The B-side was another previously unreleased song, "A Powerful Friend", which the duo had written in 1983 and had revisited for a Peel Session in 2002. Bic Hayes and Mark Refoy played guitar on the B-side track. Both songs were later included on Release: Further Listening 2001–2004 in 2017.

=== Track listing ===
7-inch single
| No. | Title | Length |
|---|---|---|
| 1. | "Love Life" | 3:45 |
| 2. | "A Powerful Friend" | 3:23 |
