= Good Lovin' (disambiguation) =

"Good Lovin'" is a song popularized by the Young Rascals in 1966.

Good Lovin' may also refer to:

- Good Lovin' (album), by David Campbell, 2008
- "Good Lovin'" (Alcazar song), 2014
- "Good Lovin'" (Benjamin Ingrosso song), 2017
- "Good Lovin'" (Jess Moskaluke song), 2013
- "Good Lovin" (Ludacris song), 2014
- "Good Lovin'" (Slim song), 2008
- "Good Lovin' (Makes It Right)", a song by Tammy Wynette, 1971

== See also ==
- "Gimme Gimme Good Lovin'", a song by Crazy Elephant, 1969
