= Mandy (album) =

Studio album by Mandy Smith
- Released: April 1988
- Recorded: 1986–1988
- Genres: Pop, dance-pop
- Label: PWL
- Producers: Stock, Aitken and Waterman; Ian Curnow; Pete Hammond; Phil Harding; Roddy Matthews; Daize Washbourne

Mandy Smith chronology
| Mandy (1988) | The Mandy EP (1988) |

Singles from Mandy
- 1. "I Just Can't Wait" Released: 19 January 1987; 2. "Positive Reaction" Released: October 1987; 3. "Boys and Girls" Released: May 1988; 4. "Victim of Pleasure" Released: September 1988; 5. "Don't You Want Me Baby" Released: May 1989

Mandy is the only studio album by the English pop singer and model Mandy Smith. Smith, who was already well known in the British tabloids due to her relationship with Rolling Stones member Bill Wyman, which started when she was 13, became the very first artist signed to Pete Waterman's PWL Records in September 1986 when she was 16 years old, and began working with producers Stock, Aitken & Waterman for her first single, which was going to be a cover of the 1964 Twinkle hit "Terry". The recording however remained unreleased as a new song, "I Just Can't Wait" was eventually released as her debut single in January 1987. While the single was not a hit in her native UK, it became a sizeable hit around Europe and Japan. The same was true for her second single, "Positive Reaction", released in October 1987.

Her European and Japanese success with the singles prompted a full album deal, and Smith worked all through late 1987 to early 1988 with Stock Aitken and Waterman as well as with some of their associate producers, including Phil Harding and Ian Curnow, Pete Hammond, Daize Washbourn and Roddy Matthews. The record was released in April 1988 and two further singles, "Boys and Girls" and "Victim of Pleasure" were also released that year. Again, the album saw chart action in Europe and Japan but was a complete failure in her native UK, failing to chart at all. Smith's final recording was a cover of The Human League's "Don't You Want Me", titled "Don't You Want Me Baby" in 1989, released as a standalone single, which became her only single to enter the UK top 75, peaking at No. 59.

The album also includes a cover of Propaganda's "Duel" and "If It Makes You Feel Good", which was originally recorded by Princess and would be recorded a year later by Donna Summer. "Stay with Me Tonight" was co-written by British singer Rick Astley under the pseudonym Dick Spatsley. He also recorded the song at the time, but it was not released until it was included on the 2CD compilation Phil Harding Club Mixes of the 80s in 2011.

The album was reissued in Japan in 1993 adding a few remixes as bonus tracks. In 2009, the album was reissued by the Cherry Pop label adding eight bonus tracks, including "Don't You Want Me Baby", the unreleased "Terry", and Smith's version of Kylie Minogue's hit "Got to Be Certain" which she had originally recorded (with slightly different lyrics) but was then given to Minogue. Smith's version was first released in 2005 as a bonus track on a compilation of Stock, Aitken & Waterman's hits. Another song, titled "Charisma" and produced by Daize Washbourn, was slated for the album but left incomplete.

== Track listing ==
1. "Stay with Me Tonight" – 3:34 (Harding, Curnow, Spatsley)
2. "I Just Can't Wait" – 3:25 (Stock, Aitken, Waterman)
3. "Victim of Pleasure" – 3:31 (Briley, Trevisick)
4. "Duel" – 4:05 (Brucken, Dorper, Freytag, Mertens)
5. "Boys and Girls" – 3:45 (Washbourne)
6. "Mandy's Theme Part 1" – 4:24 (Stock, Aitken, Waterman)
7. "If It Makes You Feel Good" – 4:31 (Stock, Aitken, Waterman)
8. "Positive Reaction" – 3:27 (Stock, Aitken, Waterman)
9. "Say It's Love (Love House)" – 3:51 (Harding, Curnow, Rhatigan)
10. "He's My Boy " – 3:49 (Stock, Aitken, Waterman)
11. "You're Never Alone" – 3:34 (Stock, Aitken, Waterman)
12. "Mandy's Theme Part 2" – 4:13 (Stock, Aitken, Waterman)

=== Bonus tracks ===
CD album has a bonus track.

1. "Positive Reaction (Miami Mix) – 3:42 (as 12th track)

These bonus tracks are included on Japan 1993 re-issue.

1. "Say It's Love (Love House)" (Xtra Beat This Mix)
2. "If It Makes You Feel Good" (Extended Version)
3. "Don't You Want Me Baby" (Cocktail Mix)
4. "Positive Reaction" (Extended Instrumental)

These bonus tracks are included on the 2009 re-issue album.

1. "Don't You Want Me Baby" (Human League cover)
2. "Got to Be Certain"
3. "Terry" (12" Mix)
4. "Positive Reaction" (Our Mandys Extended Mix)
5. "Boys and Girls" (Acid Mix)
6. "Victim of Pleasure" (Daize on Nights Mix)
7. "Don't You Want Me Baby" (Original Mix)
8. "Mandy's Theme/I Just Can't Wait" (The Cool and Breezy Jazz Version)

== Chart performance ==
| Chart (1988) | Peak position |
|---|---|
| Australia (ARIA) | 144 |
| Germany (Media Control Charts) | 60 |
| Italy (FIMI) | 41 |
| Sweden (Sverigetopplistan) | 35 |
| Switzerland (Swiss Hitparade) | 14 |
