= Inhibitions (song) =

Single by Alcazar

from the album Disco Defenders
- Released: 16 June 2008
- Recorded: 2008
- Genre: Eurodance
- Length: 3:06
- Label: Universal
- Songwriter(s): A. Hansson; N. Chinn

Alcazar singles chronology
"We Keep on Rockin'" (2008)	"Inhibitions" (2008)	"Stay the Night" (2009)

Audio video
- "Inhibitions" on YouTube

"Inhibitions" is a Eurodance song by Swedish band Alcazar, released as the second single from their third album, Disco Defenders.

== Commercial performance ==
The song made its debut on the Swedish Singles Chart at number 50 on 26 June 2008 and then dropped off the chart. The song made its re-entry on the chart at number 10 on 18 September 2008, giving Alcazar their seventh top-10 hit and the second top-10 hit from the album. "Inhibitions" stayed on the chart for four weeks.

== Charts ==
Chart performance for "Inhibitions"
Chart (2008)	Peak position
Swedish Singles Chart	10
