= Alcastar =

Single by Alcazar
- Released: March 2005
- Recorded: 2004
- Genre: Eurodance; pop
- Length: 3:06
- Label: RCA; BMG
- Songwriter(s): Johan Fransson, Anders Hansson, Tim Larsson, Tobias Lundgren, Niklas Edberger

Alcazar singles chronology
| "Here I Am" (2004) | "Alcastar" (2005) | "Start the Fire" (2005) |

Alternative cover
- Alternate single cover

Audio video
- "Alcastar" on YouTube

"Alcastar" is a song by Swedish band Alcazar, released as a single in March 2005. It was their second attempt at Melodifestivalen success, making it to the final via Andra chansen (second chance), where it came third. Upon release, the single reached number one in Sweden, their second number one after "Not a Sinner nor a Saint", their first Melodifestivalen entry.

It contains mixes by The Attic, Club Junkies and Soundfactory.

== Formats and track listings ==
=== CD single ===
1. "Alcastar" (radio edit) – 3:06
2. "Not a Sinner nor a Saint" (Mikki Remix) – 3:45

=== Maxi single ===
1. Radio edit – 3:06
2. Soundfactory Starstruck Anthem – 9:33
3. The Attic Remix – 6:11
4. Club Junkies 12" Remix – 9:35
5. Soundfactory Connection Dub – 7:32
6. Acapella – 3:04
7. Club Junkies Radio Edit – 3:40

== Charts ==
Chart performance for "Alcastar"
| Chart (2005) | Peak position |
|---|---|
| European Hot 100 Singles | 87 |
| Swedish Singles Chart | 1 |

== See also ==
- Melodifestivalen 2005
