= Mandy Smith =

English pop singer and model

- Also known as: Mandy
- Born: Amanda Louise Smith; 17 July 1970 (age 56)
- Genre: Pop
- Occupations: Singer; model
- Instrument: Vocals
- Years active: 1986–1993
- Label: PWL
- Spouse(s): Bill Wyman (m. 1989; div. 1993) Pat Van Den Hauwe (m. 1993; div. 1997)

Amanda Louise Smith (born 17 July 1970) is an English-Irish former pop singer and model. She became known in the mid-1980s for her underage relationship with, and subsequent marriage to, the Rolling Stones' bassist Bill Wyman.

== Personal life ==
Mandy Smith lived in Tottenham as a child. She met Rolling Stones bassist Bill Wyman when she attended the BPI Awards with her older sister Nicola in 1984 when she was 13 years old. Wyman was 47, and wrote in his 1990 autobiography: "She took my breath away ... she was a woman at thirteen." The relationship only became public two-and-a-half years later, when she reached the age of 16 (the legal age of consent in the United Kingdom), and resulted in a firestorm of publicity.

In 1986, Smith was scheduled to be interviewed on the Irish television show Saturday Live, but cancelled when broadcaster Raidió Teilifís Éireann (RTÉ) said she would be interviewed from a seat in the audience rather than on the set. RTÉ said she was "not important enough" and that she might "give a bad example to young teenage girls".

Smith and Wyman married on 2 June 1989 in a civil ceremony on his Suffolk estate; she was 18 and he was 52. Smith had by this time developed health issues which she blamed on being on birth control pills since the age of 14, when she said her relationship with Wyman was illegally consummated; not long after the wedding, she weighed only 80 pounds (36 kg). Wyman reportedly grew impatient with her health problems and she moved out several weeks after the wedding. The marriage ended in divorce after 23 months. Smith won a settlement then worth a reported US$880,000.

In 1993, Wyman's 30-year-old son from his first marriage, Stephen, married Smith's mother, Patsy, then aged 46. As a result, Wyman—now Smith's ex-husband—became her step-grandfather. The couple separated two years later.

On 19 June 1993, Smith married footballer Pat Van Den Hauwe, but this marriage also lasted only two years. She published a best-selling autobiography, It's All Over Now, in 1993. In 2001, she was briefly engaged to fashion model Ian Mosby, with whom she had a son.

Smith later moved to Manchester to run a public-relations company with her sister Nicola. In 2005, she returned to the Catholicism of her childhood after one of her former schoolteachers, a nun, "told me Jesus does not look at the mistakes I have made or the times I have ignored him". She said in 2010 that she was celibate at the age of 40 and had begun working with and counselling troubled teenagers.

In 2010, Smith publicly called for the age of consent in the United Kingdom to be raised from 16 to 18, saying: "People will find that odd coming from me. But I think I do know what I'm talking about here. You are still a child—even at 16. You can never get that part of your life, your childhood, back. I never could." According to Companies House records, Smith was appointed director of Kiss PR Limited on 11 November 2013, alongside her sister Nicola; she resigned on 6 February 2015, and the company was dissolved on 22 September 2015.

== Music and modelling careers ==
During the late 1980s, Smith modelled for companies including Brutus Jeans, and also worked as a print and runway model for fashion designers including Katharine Hamnett.

While dating Wyman, Smith signed with songwriting/producing trio Stock Aitken Waterman (SAW), after Pete Burns from Dead or Alive recommended her to pop impresario Pete Waterman. Smith was the first artist signed to Waterman's PWL Records—which later became the UK home of Kylie Minogue and Jason Donovan—after the producer's hopes for a £500,000 deal with a major label failed to materialise.

Smith recorded a hi-NRG cover of Twinkle's 1964 hit "Terry", but the highly publicised project was scrapped at the last minute in favour of an original composition, "I Just Can't Wait". The song failed to make an impression on the UK pop charts, a result the producers blamed on the hostility of the British media, but it was a hit in several European countries. While the song was a commercial disappointment in her home country, the track's Balearic beat version, the "Cool and Breezy Jazz Mix", was critically well received, and has been called "one of the coolest records SAW ever made". Smash Hits Australia called the song "awful" and "mildly suggestive", though songwriter Mike Stock denied that the title was a reference to the scandal surrounding Smith's underage relationship with Wyman.

Smith's lead vocals were augmented by PWL backing singer Suzanne Rhatigan, who says she was contracted to be a ghost singer for the project after Smith struggled with the material. Smith is credited as the lead vocalist, but Rhatigan's vocals were layered over hers. An album, Mandy, was released in 1988 and spawned more hits in European countries with songs like "Positive Reaction" and "Boys and Girls". Success in the UK continued to elude Smith.

Promotion for her final single, a cover of the Human League hit "Don't You Want Me", was cut short just as the track became her highest-charting UK single, after Smith became seriously ill. Referring to the lingering trauma of Smith's underage sex scandal and the intense tabloid scrutiny of her, former PWL Records engineer Karen Hewitt said of her escalating health crisis, "She got really sick and couldn't continue; she just couldn't physically work".

== Discography ==
=== Studio albums ===
Year	Album details	Peak chart positions			
Year	Album details	AUS	GER	SWE	SWI
1988	Mandy: Released: 1988; Format: LP, MC, CD; Label: PWL	144	60	35	14

=== Singles/EPs ===
Year	Single	Peak chart positions										Album	Notes
Year	Single	UK	AUS	GER	IRE	ITA	NOR	NZ	SA	SWI	US Dance	Album	Notes
1987	"I Just Can't Wait"	91	91	14	—	6	9	37	—	16	—	Mandy	
1987	"Positive Reaction"	116	—	39	—	9	—	—	—	11	—	Mandy	UK Indie Chart #48
1988	"Boys and Girls"	108	—	23	—	12	—	—	7	4	—	Mandy	
1988	"Victim of Pleasure"	93	78	49	—	11	—	—	—	28	22	Mandy	
1988	The Mandy EP	—	—	—	—	—	—	—	—	—	—	Non-album releases	Released in Hong Kong only
1989	"Don't You Want Me Baby"	59	90	—	30	11	—	—	—	—	—	Non-album releases	
1992	"I Just Can't Wait" (1992 remix)	—	—	—	—	—	—	—	—	—	—	Non-album releases	Promo 12″ only
1995	"I Just Can't Wait" (1995 remix)	—	—	—	—	—	—	—	—	—	—	Non-album releases	Promo 12″ only
"—" denotes releases that did not chart or were not released in those countries.
