= Don't You Want Me =

1981 single by the Human League

Single by the Human League

from the album Dare
- B-side: "Seconds"
- Released: 27 November 1981
- Recorded: 1981
- Studio: Genetic Sound (Streatley, Berkshire)
- Genre: Synth-pop; new wave
- Length: 3:57 (album version); 3:27 (video version)
- Label: Virgin
- Songwriters: Jo Callis; Philip Oakey; Philip Adrian Wright
- Producer: Martin Rushent

The Human League singles chronology
"Open Your Heart" (1981)	"Don't You Want Me" (1981)	"Mirror Man" (1982)

Music video
- "Don't You Want Me" on YouTube

"Don't You Want Me" is a song by the English synth-pop band the Human League (credited on the cover as the Human League 100). It was released on 27 November 1981 by Virgin Records as the fourth single from their third studio album, Dare (1981). The band's best known and most commercially successful song, it was the best selling UK single of 1981, that year's Christmas number one, and has since sold over 1,560,000 copies in the UK, making it the 23rd-most successful single in UK singles chart history. It topped the Billboard Hot 100 in the US on 3 July 1982, where it stayed for three weeks.

In November 1983, Rolling Stone named it the "breakthrough song" of the Second British Invasion of the US. In 2015, the song was voted by the British public as the nation's seventh-favourite 1980s number one in a poll for ITV. And in 2022, Rolling Stone ranked it as one of the "200 Greatest Dance Songs of All Time".

== Background ==
The lyrics were inspired after the Human League's lead vocalist Philip Oakey read a photo-story in a teen-girl's magazine. Though the song had been conceived and recorded in the studio as a male solo, Oakey was inspired by the American musical romantic drama film A Star Is Born (1976), and decided to turn the song into a conflicting duet with one of the band's two teenage female vocalists. Susan Ann Sulley was then asked to take on the role. Until then, she and the other female vocalist, Joanne Catherall, had only been assigned backing vocals; Sulley says she was chosen only through "luck of the draw".

Musicians Jo Callis and Philip Adrian Wright created a synthesizer score to accompany the lyrics that was much harsher than the version that was actually released. Initial versions of the song were recorded but Virgin Records-appointed record producer Martin Rushent was unhappy with them. He and Callis remixed the track, giving it a softer, and in Oakey's opinion, "poppy" sound. Oakey hated the new version and thought it would be the weakest track on Dare, resulting in one of his infamous rows with Rushent. Oakey disliked it so much that it was relegated to the last track on side two of the album.

Before the release of the band's third studio album Dare (1981), three of its tracks—"The Sound of the Crowd", "Love Action (I Believe in Love)", and "Open Your Heart"—had already been released as successful singles. With a hit album and three hit singles in a row, Virgin's chief executive Simon Draper decided to release one more single from the album before the end of 1981. His choice, "Don't You Want Me", instantly caused a row with Oakey, who did not want another single to be released because he was convinced that "the public were now sick of hearing" the band and the choice of the "poor quality filler track" would almost certainly be a disaster, wrecking the group's new-found popularity. The band felt the track was "our sort of Des O'Connor song". Virgin were adamant that a fourth single would be released and Oakey finally agreed on the condition that a large colour poster accompany the 7" single, because he felt fans would "feel ripped off" by the "substandard" single alone.

The Human League often added cryptic references to their productions and the record sleeve of "Don't You Want Me" featured the suffix of "100". This was a reference to The 100 Club, a restaurant and bar in Sheffield.

== Critical reception ==
In a contemporary review, Record World praised its "throbbing synthesized beat and sharp hook".

Today, the song is widely considered a classic of its era. In a retrospective review, Stephen Thomas Erlewine, senior editor for AllMusic, described the song as "a devastating chronicle of a frayed romance wrapped in the greatest pop hooks and production of its year". Fellow English new wave musician Graham Parker praised the song, saying, "I just love that catchy chorus."

== Chart performance and sales ==
"Don't You Want Me" was released in the UK in 1981. The B-side was "Seconds", another track lifted straight from the Dare album. As with previous singles, a 12" version was also issued featuring the original version of "Don't You Want Me" and "Seconds" on the A-side, and an "extended dance mix" lasting seven-and-a-half minutes on the B-side. This mix is also featured on the remix album Love and Dancing that was released under the name of the League Unlimited Orchestra in 1982.

To the amazement of the band (and especially Oakey), the song entered the UK singles chart at number nine and rose to number one the following week, remaining there over the Christmas period for five weeks. It ultimately became the biggest-selling single to be released in 1981, and the fifth-biggest-selling single of the entire decade. Its success was repeated six months later in the US, with "Don't You Want Me" peaking at number one on the Billboard Hot 100 for three weeks. Billboard magazine ranked it as the sixth-biggest hit of 1982.

After the band scored a number of hits for Warner's East West label, the song was remixed and issued by Virgin as a CD, cassette and twelve-inch single on 16 October 1995. This version featured new remixes by Hooj Choons' Red Jerry and the German Eurodance group Snap!, and would peak at number 16 on the UK singles chart. The release coincided with the issue of the Human League's second Greatest Hits compilation album shortly afterwards (which featured the Snap! 7-inch remix).

As of November 2012, "Don't You Want Me" was the 23rd-best-selling single in the UK, with 1.55 million copies sold. On 23 March 2014, the song re-entered the UK singles chart at number 19 due to a social media campaign by fans of the Scottish football club Aberdeen. In 2017, it was reported to be the 43rd-most successful single in UK chart history with sales and streams combined.

In 2021, Viacom International Studios put into production a music chart programme titled The 80s Greatest Hits 1980–1989 for Channel 5 and asked the Official Charts Company (OCC) to provide the countdowns for the series, based on the best-selling singles for each year. When the 1981 episode was broadcast (now under the title of Britain's Favourite 80's Songs), "Don't You Want Me" was placed at number one, with the OCC now confirming it was the official best-selling song of 1981 with an estimated 1.15 million sales (previously the title had gone to "Tainted Love" by the British synth-pop duo Soft Cell, which now has been put in second place with 1.05 million sales).

== Music video ==
In 1981, the Human League's record label Virgin were becoming aware that the music video was evolving into an important marketing tool, with MTV being launched that year. Virgin commissioned a promotional video for "Don't You Want Me".

The video for the song was filmed near Slough, Berkshire, during November 1981. Its theme is the filming and editing of a crime fiction film, featuring the band members as characters and production staff. It is a "making-of" video, and so both crew and camera apparatus appear throughout. It has at its core the interaction between a successful actress (also an assistant editor), played by Susan Ann Sulley, walking out on "film director" Philip Oakey on a film set.

The video was said by Susan Ann Sulley to be "a take on The French Lieutenant's Woman, which was a film about making a film"; but the video's director, Irish-British filmmaker Steve Barron, who conceived the storyline, said he was influenced by the François Truffaut romantic comedy-drama film Day for Night (1973) and had "wanted to go one step further and try and make a film within a film within a film".

In a 1995 interview, Catherall mentioned that the car Jo Callis was driving had to be pushed into shot as he could not drive at the time, to which Sulley added: "he still can't!"

The video was released in December 1981 and utilises a special edit of the track, making the video 30 seconds shorter than the single version.

== Track listing ==
=== 1981 release ===
- 7-inch vinyl (Virgin VS466)
1. "Don't You Want Me" – 3:57
2. "Seconds" – 4:59
- 12-inch vinyl (Virgin VS466-12)
1. "Don't You Want Me" – 3:57
2. "Seconds" – 4:59
3. "Don't You Want Me (dance mix)" – 7:30

=== 1995 release ===
- CD (Virgin VSCDT1557)
1. "Don't You Want Me (Red Jerry 7" Remix)" – 3:43
2. "Don't You Want Me (Snap! 7" Remix)" – 3:58
3. "Don't You Want Me (Red Jerry 12" Remix)" – 6:11
4. "Don't You Want Me (Snap! 12" Extended Remix)" – 6:14
5. "Don't You Want Me (Red Jerry Dub Mix)" – 7:01
6. "Don't You Want Me (Original Version)" – 3:57
- 12-inch vinyl (Virgin VST1557)
1. "Don't You Want Me (Snap! 12" Extended Remix)" – 6:12
2. "Don't You Want Me (Red Jerry 12" Remix)" – 6:09
- Cassette (Virgin VSC 1557)
1. "Don't You Want Me (Red Jerry 7" Remix)" – 3:43
2. "Don't You Want Me (Snap! 7" Remix)" – 3:58
3. "Don't You Want Me (Red Jerry 12" Remix)" – 6:11
4. "Don't You Want Me (Original Version)" – 3:57

== Charts ==
=== Weekly charts ===
Chart (1981–1982)	Peak position
Australia (Kent Music Report)	4
Belgium (Ultratop 50 Flanders)	1
Canada Top Singles (RPM)	1
France (SNEP)	13
Ireland (IRMA)	1
Israel (Israeli Singles Chart)	1
Italy (Musica e dischi)	7
Netherlands (Dutch Top 40)	5
Netherlands (Single Top 100)	6
New Zealand (Recorded Music NZ)	1
Norway (VG-lista)	1
South Africa (Springbok Radio)	2
Spain (Promusicae)	4
Sweden (Sverigetopplistan)	3
Switzerland (Schweizer Hitparade)	4
UK Singles (Official Charts)	1
US Billboard Hot 100	1
US Hot Dance/Disco (Billboard)	3
US Mainstream Rock Tracks (Billboard)	4
West Germany (GfK)	5

1995 remixes

Chart (1995)	Peak position
Hungary (Mahasz)	10
Japan (Japanese Singles Chart) (Tokyo)	100
UK Singles (OCC)	16

2014 re-entry

Chart (2014)	Peak position
Scotland (OCC)	1
UK Singles (OCC)	19

=== Year-end charts ===
Chart (1981)	Rank
UK Singles (OCC)	1

Chart (1982)	Rank
Australia (Kent Music Report)	37
Canada Top Singles (RPM)	8
Netherlands (Dutch Top 40)	49
New Zealand (Recorded Music NZ)	8
South Africa (Springbok Chart)	16
US Billboard Hot 100	6

=== All-time charts ===
Chart	Position
UK Singles (OCC)	27
US Billboard Hot 100	179

== Certifications ==
Region	Certification	Certified units/sales
Canada (Music Canada)	Platinum	100,000^{^}
Denmark (IFPI Danmark)	Gold	45,000^{‡}
Italy (FIMI) since 2009 sales	Gold	50,000^{‡}
New Zealand (RMNZ)	2× Platinum	60,000^{‡}
Spain (Promusicae)	Gold	30,000^{‡}
United Kingdom (BPI)	3× Platinum	1,800,000^{‡}
United States (RIAA)	Gold	1,000,000^{^}
^{^} Shipments figures based on certification alone.^{‡} Sales+streaming figures based on certification alone.

== Mandy Smith version ==
"Don't You Want Me Baby"

Single by Mandy Smith

from the album Mandy
- B-side: "If It Makes You Feel Good"
- Released: May 1989
- Recorded: 1989
- Genre: Pop
- Length: 3:44
- Label: PWL
- Songwriters: Philip Oakey; Jo Callis; Philip Adrian Wright
- Producer: Pete Hammond

Mandy Smith singles chronology
"Victim of Pleasure" (1988)	"Don't You Want Me Baby" (1989)	"I Just Can't Wait (92' Remixes)" (1992)

In 1989, British pop singer and model Mandy covered this song under the title of "Don't You Want Me Baby". Released as a stand-alone single from her only studio album, Mandy (1988), it was also Smith's final single and became her only single to hit the UK top 75, peaking at number 59 on the UK Singles Chart.

=== Track listings ===
- CD single
1. "Don't You Want Me Baby"
2. "If It Makes You Feel Good"
3. "Don't You Want Me Baby" (Cocktail Mix)
4. "If It Makes You Feel Good" (Extended Version)
- 7-inch single
1. "Don't You Want Me Baby"
2. "If It Makes You Feel Good"
- 12-inch single
1. "Don't You Want Me Baby" (Cocktail Mix)
2. "If It Makes You Feel Good" (Extended Version)

=== Charts ===
Chart (1989)	Peak Position
Finland (Suomen virallinen lista)	10
Ireland (IRMA)	30
Italy (Musica e dischi)	11
UK Singles (OCC)	59

== The Farm version ==
"Don't You Want Me"

Single by the Farm

from the album Love See No Colour
- B-side: "Obviously"
- Released: 5 October 1992
- Genre: Dance-rock
- Length: 4:12
- Label: End Product
- Songwriters: Jo Callis; Philip Oakey; Philip Adrian Wright
- Producer: Mark Saunders

The Farm singles chronology
"Rising Sun" (1992)	"Don't You Want Me" (1992)	"Love See No Colour (re-mix)" (1992)

The British band the Farm released a cover version of "Don't You Want Me" in October 1992 by label End Product that reached number 18 on the UK singles charts making it their third-highest chart single after 1990's "All Together Now" and "Groovy Train". It was produced by Mark Saunders and originally recorded for the NME charity album Ruby Trax.

An uncredited female singer sings lead vocal on the second verse, as sung by Susan Ann Sulley in the original version. The accompanying music video features former Manchester United footballer George Best mouthing along to the chorus.

=== Track listings ===
- CD single
1. "Don't You Want Me"
2. "Don't You Want Me" (Premier mix)
3. "Obviously"
4. "Groovy Train" (alternative mix)
- 7-inch single
1. "Don't You Want Me"
2. "Obviously"
- 12-inch single
1. "Don't You Want Me" (Premier mix)
2. "Don't You Want Me" (20K mix)
3. "Don't You Want Me" (Pickles Keef mix)
4. "Groovy Train" (alternative mix)

=== Charts ===
Year (1992)	Peak position
Australia (ARIA)	115
Ireland (IRMA)	19
UK Singles (OCC)	18
UK Airplay (Music Week)	24
UK Dance (Music Week)	30

== Alcazar version ==
"Don't You Want Me"

Single by Alcazar

from the album Casino
- Released: May 2002
- Recorded: 2001
- Genre: Eurodance
- Length: 3:27
- Label: RCA; BMG
- Songwriters: Jo Callis; Philip Oakey; Philip Adrian Wright

Alcazar singles chronology
"Sexual Guarantee" (2001)	"Don't You Want Me" (2002)	"Not a Sinner nor a Saint" (2003)

Music video
- "Don't You Want Me" on YouTube

"Don't You Want Me" was recorded as a Eurodance song by the Swedish nu-disco group Alcazar, released internationally in 2002. The song was included in the European version of their debut studio album, Casino (2000) together with a few others. It was recorded in Stockholm at first, but when the band wanted it for a new pan-European single, a new version was made.

The single was released in Australia as a follow-up to the successful single "Crying at the Discoteque". The white 12-inch was released in Europe and distributed to DJs to get maximum airplay at the disco arenas.

"Don't You Want Me" is Alcazar's biggest hit in the United States with 15 weeks on the Billboard Hot Dance Club Play chart, peaking at #30.

=== Music video ===
The accompanying music video for "Don't You Want Me" was filmed at Filmhuset in Stockholm, and was directed by Jesper Ganslandt. The video takes place in "Circus Alcazar" and is filled with horses, ducks, an evil parrot, acrobats, the Alcazar ballet (including a dog in a pink ballerina dress) and Annika Kjærgaard's boyfriend juggling with fire in the background. The video shoot took almost 23 hours.

=== Track listing ===
- CD single
1. "Almighty Radio Edit" – 3:27
2. "Almighty Club Mix" – 7:25
3. "Project Eden Remix" – 7:34
4. "Earth Club Anthem" – 10:24
5. "Wild Cowboys Radio Mix" – 3:38

=== Charts ===
Chart (2002)	Peak position
Australia (ARIA)	37
Belgium (Ultratop 50 Flanders)	21
Finland (Suomen virallinen lista)	18
Hungary (Single Top 40)	13
Italy (Musica e dischi)	34
Japan (Japanese Singles Chart)	3
Netherlands (Single Top 100)	83
Sweden (Sverigetopplistan)	30
Switzerland (Schweizer Hitparade)	76
US Hot Dance Club Play (Billboard)	30

== See also ==
- List of Billboard Hot 100 number ones of 1982
- "Closer", 2016 song by The Chainsmokers featuring Halsey with a similar duet style and lyrical content
