= Positive Reaction (song) =

Single by Mandy Smith

from the album Mandy
- Released: October 1987
- Recorded: 1987
- Genre: Dance-pop
- Length: 3:27
- Label: PWL
- Songwriter: Stock Aitken Waterman
- Producer: Stock Aitken Waterman

Mandy Smith singles chronology
"I Just Can't Wait" (1987)	"Positive Reaction" (1987)	"Boys and Girls" (1988)

Music video
- "Positive Reaction" on YouTube

Professional ratings
Review scores
Source	Rating
Number One	2/5 stars

"Positive Reaction" is a song written and produced by Stock Aitken Waterman for Mandy Smith's debut studio album Mandy (1988). The song was released in October 1987 as the album's second single. The song failed to chart in the UK. It was however successful around Europe.

"Positive Reaction" is an upbeat and catchy pop song with a strong dance beat and synth-driven melody. The lyrics are about a woman who is feeling empowered and positive after a breakup, and are delivered with a confident and enthusiastic vocal performance from Smith.

== Critical reception ==
In review of 31 October 1987 Richard James of Number One called "Positive Reaction" "typical high energy crap". He wrote: "After Stock Aitken and Waterman did a classic like Sinitta's "Toy Boy", this in comparison sounds like they found it lying in a box said 'oi Mandy, sing that one luv'. All girls like this have similar voices." Jerry Smith of British magazine Music Week described the song as "stretching [SAW's] rapidly thinning credibility even further".

== Formats and track listings ==
- 7" single
1. "Positive Reaction" - 3:27
2. "Positive Reaction" (A Man Das Mix - Instrumental) - 3:49
- 12" single
1. "Positive Reaction" (Our Mandy's Extended Mix) - 6:24
2. "Positive Reaction" (A Man Das Mix - Instrumental) - 3:49
- 12" remix
1. "Positive Reaction" (Miami Mix) - 6:58
2. "Positive Reaction" (A Man Das Mix - Instrumental) - 3:49

== Charts ==
=== Weekly charts ===
Chart (1987)	Peak Position
Italy (Musica e dischi)	20
Italy Airplay (Music & Media)	15
Switzerland (Schweizer Hitparade)	11
West Germany (GfK)	39
