= Annika Kjærgaard =

Swedish singer (born 1971)

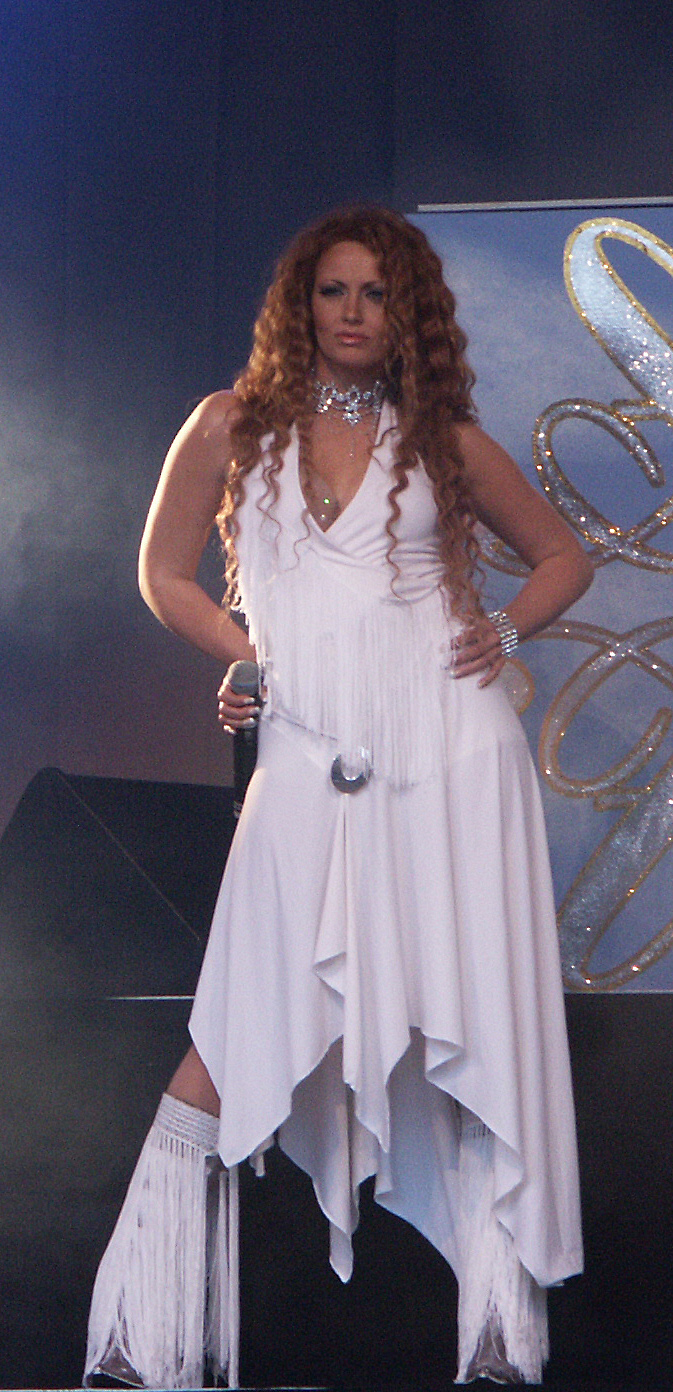
- Annika during an Alcazar concert in 2004

Background information
- Born: Annika Eva Ingegerd Johansson; 18 May 1971 (age 54)
- Origin: Hässleholm, Sweden
- Genres: Pop
- Occupation: Singer
- Instrument: Vocals
- Website: Glamourfiore.tripod.com

Annika Eva Ingegerd Kjærgaard (née Johansson; born 18 May 1971) is a Swedish singer and former member of the Swedish pop group Alcazar.

== Career ==
Kjærgaard was born in Hässleholm, Sweden. Mostly known as Annikafiore in Alcazar, she quit the group in 2007, leaving a spot open for Lina Hedlund. Magnus Carlsson also left during that time. However Therese Merkel and Andreas Lundstedt stayed and continued with the Alcazar project.

In 2009, Annikafiore formed a new group called Avatar versus Eve (A.v. E). Their first single "Party People" came with six different versions, including a remix by the internationally known SoundFactory.

== Personal life ==
In September 2004 Annika married her Danish boyfriend Jeppe Kjærgaard and they are currently residing in Höllviken. The couple has a son born in December 2007.

== Discography ==
Alcazar albums

- 1999–2002: Casino – Released in: Sweden, UK, Taiwan, Japan, Australia, USA & Europa.
- 2003–2004: Alcazarized – Released in: Sweden, Germany, Russia, Asia, South Korea, Japan, and Taiwan.
- 2004: Dancefloor Deluxe [2CD] – Released in: Sweden & Finland
- 2005: Dancefloor Deluxe – Released in: Sweden & Germany & Tyskland

Alcazar singles

- 2005: Start the Fire
- 2005: Alcastar
- 2004: Here I Am
- 2004: Physical
- 2004: This is the World We Live in
- 2003: Love Life
- 2003: Someday
- 2003: Ménage à trois
- 2003: Not a Sinner nor a Saint
- 2002: Don't You Want Me
- 2001: Sexual Guarantee
- 2001: Crying at the Discothèque
- 2000: Ritmo del Amor
- 1999: Shine On

A.v. E singles

- 2008: I´ve Still Got the Highest Heels in the Room
- 2009: Party People
- 2009: I'm On Fire (feat. Sophie Rimheden)

Annikafiore singles

- 2010: Forbidden Love (Official Copenhagen Pride 2010 song)
- 2011: Don't Wanna C U 2nite No. 16 Swedish Dance Charts
