= Start the Fire (Alcazar song) =

- One of cover arts

Single by Alcazar

from the album Dancefloor Deluxe
- B-side: "Glamourama", "Nothing But the Video On"
- Released: 15 August 2005
- Recorded: 2004
- Genre: Eurodance; pop
- Length: 3:34
- Label: RCA; BMG
- Songwriter(s): Billy Joel; Ken Gold; Michael Denne

Alcazar singles chronology
"Alcastar" (2005)	"Start the Fire" (2005)	"We Keep on Rockin'" (2008)

Music video
- "Alcazar - Start The Fire (Video)" on YouTube

"Start the Fire" is a song by Swedish band Alcazar, released as the second single from their compilation album Dancefloor Deluxe, before their three-year hiatus. The chorus is borrowed from Billy Joel's classic hit "We Didn't Start the Fire", though the verses are completely new. It also features samples from "Heartache # 9" by Delegation. The maxi single contains two previously unreleased tracks "Glamourama" and "Nothing But the Video On".

The track reached number 10 in Sweden, and number 87 in Switzerland.

== Music video ==
A music video was produced to promote the single. During the filming of the video, one of the lead singers, Annikafiore broke her foot. Therefore, she was only shown in certain scenes of the music video (the ones shot before the injury).

== Track listing ==
=== CD single ===
1. "Start the Fire" (original version)
2. "Nothing But the Video On" (previously unreleased)

=== Maxi single ===
1. "Start the Fire" (original version)
2. "Glamourama" (previously unreleased)
3. "Nothing But the Video On" (previously unreleased)
4. "Start the Fire" (extended version)
5. "Physical" (Poolbreeze Mix)
6. "Start the Fire" (a cappella)

== Chart performance ==
Chart performance for "Start the Fire"
Chart (2005)	Peak position
Swedish Singles Chart	10
Swiss Singles Chart	87
