= Blame It on the Disco =

Single by Alcazar
- Released: 23 February 2014
- Recorded: 2013
- Genre: Nu-disco; Europop
- Length: 3:04
- Label: Warner Music Sweden
- Songwriters: Fredrik Kempe; Victor Finke; David Kreuger; Hamid "K-One" Pirouzpanah

Alcazar singles chronology
"Feel 4 U" (2011)	"Blame It on the Disco" (2014)	"Good Lovin" (2014)

Audio video
- "Blame It on the Disco" on YouTube

"Blame It on the Disco" is a song by Swedish pop group Alcazar. The song was an entry in the Melodifestivalen 2014 for the Eurovision Song Contest 2014, where it reached the finale, subsequently placing in third place. The single was a success in Sweden, peaking at number 10 on the Swedish Singles Chart.

== Track listing ==
CD single

1. "Blame It on the Disco" (radio edit) – 3:04
2. "Blame It on the Disco" (live a cappella version) – 3:00

== Charts ==
Chart performance for "Blame It on the Disco"
Chart (2014)	Peak position
Sweden (Sverigetopplistan)	10

== See also ==
- Melodifestivalen 2014
