= Stay the Night (Alcazar song) =

Single by Alcazar

from the album Disco Defenders
- Released: 3 March 2009
- Recorded: 2008
- Genre: Eurodance
- Length: 3:02
- Label: Universal
- Songwriter(s): A. Hansson; M. Sanden; T. Merkel; A. Lundstedt; L. Hedlund

Alcazar singles chronology
"Inhibitions" (2008)	"Stay the Night" (2009)	"Headlines" (2010)

Audio video
- "Stay The Night" on YouTube

"Stay the Night" is a song by Swedish pop group Alcazar. The song was an entry in Melodifestivalen 2009 for the Eurovision Song Contest 2009, where it reached the 14 March final at Globen Arena after a public televote. Having placed third with the regional juries and 4th in the televote, the song finished fifth overall. "Stay the Night" is the third single on Alcazar's 2009 album Disco Defenders.

== Commercial performance ==
The song made its debut on the Swedish Singles Chart at number 33 on 6 March 2009 and peaked at number two the next week. The song charted for 17 weeks. The song also charted on the Swedish Airplay Chart, peaking at number one for four weeks.

== Track listing ==
CD single

1. Radio edit – 3:02
2. Karaoke version – 3:02

Digital download

1. "Stay the Night" (radio edit) – 3:02

== Charts ==
Chart performance for "Stay the Night"
Chart (2009)	Peak position
European Hot 100 Singles	45
Swedish Singles Chart	2

== See also ==
- Melodifestivalen 2009
