= Lina Hedlund =

Swedish singer

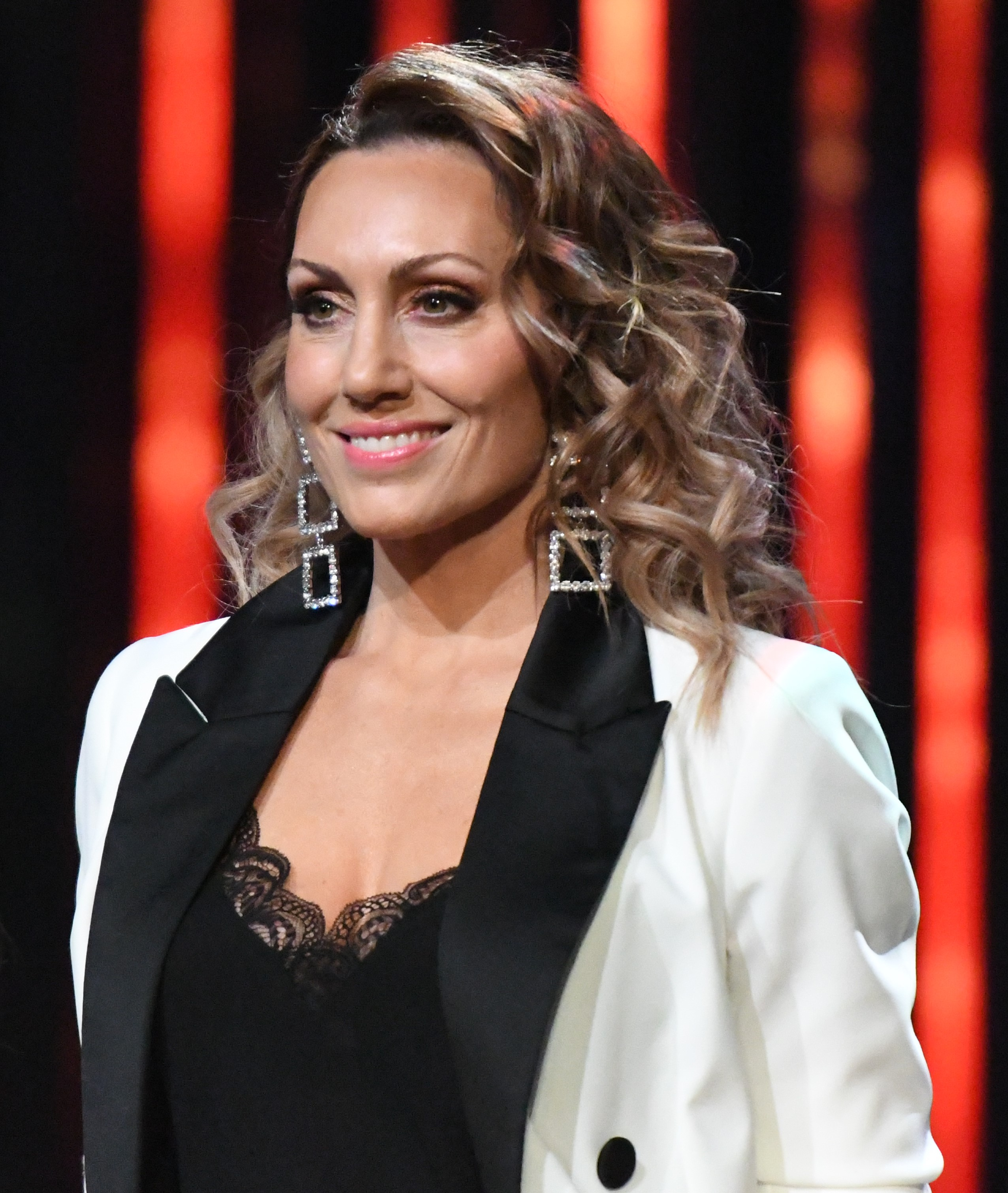
- Hedlund during Melodifestivalen 2020

Background information
- Born: Lina Maria Hedlund; 28 March 1978 (age 47); Bollnäs, Sweden
- Genres: Pop, Musical
- Occupations: Singer, actress
- Years active: 1996–present

Lina Maria Hedlund (born 28 March 1978) is a Swedish singer and member of the pop group Alcazar. She also has a solo career.

== Career ==
Hedlund was born in Bollnäs. She has participated in Melodifestivalen a number of times, in Melodifestivalen 2002 along with her sister, singer Hanna Hedlund with the song "Big Time Party", in Melodifestivalen 2003 as a solo singer, and in Melodifestivalen 2009, 2010 and 2014 as a member of the pop trio Alcazar. In late 2003 Lina released the single "Lady Bump".

In 2007, Hedlund joined the pop group Alcazar after the departure of Magnus Carlsson and Annika Kjærgaard; her first gig with the group was at the G-A-Y nightclub in London, UK. Her first music single with the group was "We Keep On Rockin". In 2011 Hedlund made her first appearance as a TV presenter in the musical gameshow Copycat Singers broadcast on TV3. She has also been the host of the web series Sweden's best music on digitallive.eu.

She participated in Melodifestivalen 2019 with the song "Victorious", in the semifinal she qualified to the final.

On 3 September 2019, Hedlund was announced as a presenter of Melodifestivalen 2020 along with David Sundin and Linnea Henriksson.

== Personal life ==
Lina and her boyfriend Nassim Al Fakir have two sons: Tilo, born 20 March 2012, and Eide, born 6 October 2016.

== Discography ==
=== Singles ===
| Title | Year | Peak chart positions | Album |
| Title | Year | SWE | Album |
|---|---|---|---|
| "Big Time Party" | 2002 | – | Non-album singles |
| "Lady Bump" | 2003 | – | Non-album singles |
| "Victorious" | 2019 | 28 | Non-album singles |
| "Breathe" | 2019 | – | Non-album singles |
| "Deeper Love" | 2019 | – | Non-album singles |
