= We Keep on Rockin' =

Single by Alcazar

from the album Disco Defenders
- Released: 29 April 2008
- Recorded: 2007
- Genre: Eurodance
- Length: 3:38
- Label: Universal
- Songwriter(s): Anders Hansson

Alcazar singles chronology
"Start the Fire" (2005)	"We Keep on Rockin'" (2008)	"Inhibitions" (2008)

Music video
- "Alcazar - We Keep On Rockin'" on YouTube

"We Keep on Rockin" is a Eurodance song written by Anders Hansson and performed by Swedish band Alcazar. The song is the first single from their third album, Disco Defenders, and it was released at the beginning of 2008.

== Commercial performance ==
The song made its debut on Swedish Singles Chart at number 31 on 7 February 2008, peaking at number 4 on 21 February 2008, giving Alcazar another top-10 hit. "We Keep on Rockin'" stayed on the Swedish Singles Chart for a total of eleven weeks.

== Music video ==
A music video was produced to promote the single.

== Track listing ==
CD single

1. Radio Edit – 3:36
2. Extended Mix – 6:36
3. FL Club Mix – 3:50
4. FL On the Rocks Version – 3:09
5. Belotto & Cabrera Club Mix – 4:28

== Charts ==
Chart performance for "We Keep on Rockin'"
Chart (2008)	Peak position
Hungary (Editors' Choice Top 40)	18
Swedish Singles Chart	4
