= I Just Can't Wait =

1987 single by Mandy Smith

- Artwork for most 7-inch vinyl releases

Single by Mandy Smith

from the album Mandy
- B-side: "You're Never Alone"
- Released: January 1987
- Studio: PWL (London)
- Genre: Synth-pop
- Length: 3:24
- Label: PWL
- Songwriter: Stock Aitken Waterman
- Producer: Stock Aitken Waterman

Mandy Smith singles chronology
"I Just Can't Wait" (1987)	"Positive Reaction" (1987)

Music video
- "I Just Can't Wait" on YouTube

"I Just Can't Wait" is the debut single by the English singer Mandy Smith, produced by Stock Aitken Waterman (SAW), and was the first release by Pete Waterman's new label, PWL in January 1987. Despite intense publicity in the wake of Smith's relationship with Bill Wyman, the song charted poorly in the UK, a result the producers blamed on the hostility of the British media. It proved, however, to be a substantial hit in a number of European countries. Remixed versions of the song were released in the UK in 1992 and 1995, but did not chart.

== Critical reception ==
While "I Just Can't Wait" missed the top 40 in her home country, the track's Balearic beat version, the "Cool and Breezy Jazz Mix", was critically well received, and has been called "one of the coolest records SAW ever made". Smash Hits Australia slated the song as "awful [and] mildly suggestive", though songwriter Mike Stock denied that the title was a reference to the scandal surrounding Smith's underage relationship with Wyman.

In 2023, Alexis Petridis of The Guardian listed the Cool and Breezy Jazz Version at number 15 in his "Stock Aitken Waterman's 20 greatest songs – ranked!", adding: "It expunges almost all of Smith's vocal in favour of an acoustic guitar solo, and sounds suitably sun-drenched and blissful".

== Chart performance ==
"I Just Can't Wait" was a commercial failure in the UK and Australia, where it peaked at number 91 in both countries, with three weeks of charting in the UK in February and March 1987. The song, however, did better in Continental Europe, particularly in Norway, the only nation in which it entered the top ten, attaining number nine. It was also a top 20 hit in Germany where it reached number 14 with a 12-week chart run, Switzerland where it culminated at number 16 and charted for eight weeks, and Italy where it peaked at number 19 and totaled 11 weeks on the chart. In addition, it spent two weeks in the top 50 of the New Zealand Singles Chart, with number 37 as highest position, and was present for two weeks on the Music & Media's Pan-Eurochart Hot 100 singles chart, peaking at number 90 in its first week.

== Track listings ==
- UK 7-inch single

A. "I Just Can't Wait" – 3:24
B. "You're Never Alone" – 3:40

- UK 12-inch single

A. "I Just Can't Wait" – 7:00
B1. "I Just Can't Wait" (Instrumental) – 4:25
B2. "You're Never Alone" – 3:40

- UK 12" single - 1992 mixes

A. "I Just Can't Wait" (Garage Discotech mix)
B1. "I Just Can't Wait" (the Vocal Loc mix)
B2. "I Just Can't Wait" (the Vocal Loc mix) (instrumental)

- UK 12" single - 1995 mixes

A1. "I Just Can't Wait" (Brandon Block/Alex P remix)
A2. "I Just Can't Wait" (Shades of Rhythm Dub mix)
B1. "I Just Can't Wait" (Keith Mac Project remix)
B2. "I Just Can't Wait" (the Cool and Breezy Jazz version)

== Credits and personnel ==
Credits and personnel adapted from the Mandy album and 7-inch single liner notes:

- Mandy Smith – vocals
- Stock Aitken Waterman – songwriter, producer
- Mark McGuire – engineering
- Brian Aris – cover art, photographer

== Charts ==
Weekly chart performance for "I Just Can't Wait"
Chart (1987)	Peak position
Australia (Kent Music Report)	91
Europe (Eurochart Hot 100)	90
Italy (Musica e dischi)	19
New Zealand (Recorded Music NZ)	37
Norway (VG-lista)	9
Switzerland (Schweizer Hitparade)	16
UK Singles (Official Charts)	91
West Germany (GfK)	14

Chart (1995)	Peak position
UK Pop Tip Club Chart (Music Week)	28
