= Ménage à Trois (song) =

Single by Alcazar

from the album Alcazarized
- Released: 30 June 2003
- Recorded: 2003
- Genre: Nu-disco, Europop
- Length: 3:51
- Label: BMG, RCA Records
- Songwriter(s): G. Samuelson, M. Lundh, Q. Starkie. L. Robbins

Alcazar singles chronology
"Not a Sinner Nor a Saint" (2003)	"Ménage à Trois" (2003)	"Someday" (2003)

Music video
- "Alcazar - Mènage A Trois (Video)" on YouTube

Ménage à Trois is a song performed by Swedish band Alcazar. The song is the second single from their second album, Alcazarized, and it was set to be the first released internationally.

== Music video ==
A music video was produced to promote the single.

== Formats and track listings ==
These are the formats and track listings of promotional single releases of "Ménage à Trois".

=== CD single ===
1. "Radio Edit" - 3:51
2. "The Mute8 Mix" - 6:09
3. "J Pipe Smooth Club" - 5:44
4. "Now in Stereo Edit" - 7:17
5. "Fls Darkroom Remix" - 7:43

== Chart performance ==
Chart (2003)	Peak position
Swedish Singles Chart	19
Romanian Top 100	52
Finnish Airplay Chart	6
Finnish Dance Chart	19
Eurochart Hot 100 Singles	54
UK Airplay Chart	48
UK Dance Chart	35
