= Casino (Alcazar album) =

Studio album by Alcazar
- Released: 18 October 2000
- Recorded: 1999–2000
- Genres: Eurodance; Europop; electropop
- Length: 53:50
- Labels: RCA; BMG
- Producer: Alexander Bard

Alcazar chronology
| Casino (2000) | Alcazarized (2003) |

Singles from Casino
- 1. "Shine On" Released: 1999; 2. "Crying at the Discoteque" Released: 10 April 2000; 3. "Ritmo Del Amor" Released: September 2000; 4. "Sexual Guarantee" Released: 19 November 2001; 5. "Don't You Want Me" Released: May 2002

Alternative cover
- Re-issued in 2002 and released internationally

Professional ratings
Review scores
| Source | Rating |
|---|---|
| Blender | 3/5 stars |
| MTV Asia | 5/10 |

Casino is the debut studio album by the Swedish group Alcazar, released on 18 October 2000 in Sweden and on 8 February 2002 worldwide. It was produced by Alexander Bard, who also managed the group, and is known for his work with the Swedish glam-pop band Army of Lovers. The album includes the number-one singles "Crying at the Discoteque" and "Sexual Guarantee."

== Track listing ==
Scandinavian edition
| No. | Title | Writer(s) | Length |
|---|---|---|---|
| 1. | "Don't Leave Me Alone" | Alexander Bard, Anders Hansson | 4:08 |
| 2. | "Crying at the Discoteque" | Alexander Bard, Anders Hansson, Anders Wollbeck, Bernard Edwards, Michael Goulos, Nile Rodgers | 3:50 |
| 3. | "Shine On" | Alexander Bard, Anders Hansson | 3:34 |
| 4. | "Transmetropolis" | Alexander Bard, Anders Hansson | 4:12 |
| 5. | "Stars Come Out at Night" | Alexander Bard, Anders Hansson, Anders Wollbeck | 3:36 |
| 6. | "Paris in the Rain" | Alexander Bard, Anders Hansson, Johan Strandkvist | 3:33 |
| 7. | "Baby Come Back" | Alexander Bard, Kirk Degiorgio, Ries | 3:29 |
| 8. | "Salome" | Alexander Bard, Anders Hansson, Anders Wollbeck | 4:11 |
| 9. | "Ritmo Del Amor" | Alexander Bard, Anders Wollbeck | 3:24 |
| 10. | "Seasons in the Sun" | Jacques Brel, Rod McKuen | 3:31 |
| 11. | "Tears of a Clone" | Alexander Bard, Anders Wollbeck | 4:15 |
| 12. | "The Bells of Alcazar" | Alexander Bard, Anders Wollbeck | 4:00 |
| 13. | "Blues in G-Minor" | Andreas Lundstedt, Micke Svahn, Mikael Agnepil, Alexander Bard | 3:26 |
| 14. | "Dub Leave Me Alone" | Alexander Bard, Anders Hansson | 4:30 |
| Total length: | | | 53:50 |

International edition
| No. | Title | Writer(s) | Length |
|---|---|---|---|
| 1. | "Sexual Guarantee" | Alexander Bard, Anders Hansson, Bernard Edwards, Johan Strandkvist, Nile Rodgers | 3:36 |
| 2. | "Crying at the Discoteque" | Alexander Bard, Anders Hansson, Anders Wollbeck, Bernard Edwards, Michael Goulos, Nile Rodgers | 3:53 |
| 3. | "Don't Leave Me Alone" | Alexander Bard, Anders Hansson | 4:09 |
| 4. | "Almost Famous" | Blomqvist, Röhr, Sahun | 3:59 |
| 5. | "Paradise" | Alexander Bard, Anders Hansson, Clayton, Johan Strandkvist, Sigidi | 3:48 |
| 6. | "Transmetropolis" | Alexander Bard, Anders Hansson | 4:12 |
| 7. | "Stars Come Out at Night" | Alexander Bard, Anders Hansson, Anders Wollbeck | 3:38 |
| 8. | "Paris in the Rain" | Alexander Bard, Anders Hansson, Johan Strandkvist | 3:43 |
| 9. | "Baby Come Back" | Alexander Bard, Kirk Degiorgio, Ries | 3:28 |
| 10. | "Breaking Free" | Gustave Lund, Peder Ernerot | 3:47 |
| 11. | "Don't You Want Me" (album version) | Philip Adrian Wright, Jo Callis, Philip Oakey | 3:35 |
| 12. | "Shine On" | Alexander Bard, Anders Hansson | 3:34 |
| 13. | "Ritmo Del Amor" | Alexander Bard, Anders Wollbeck | 3:20 |
| 14. | "Tears of a Clone" | Alexander Bard, Anders Wollbeck | 4:15 |
| 15. | "The Bells of Alcazar" | Alexander Bard, Anders Wollbeck | 3:58 |
| 16. | "Blues in G-Minor" (hidden track) | Andreas Lundstedt, Micke Svahn, Mikael Agnepil, Alexander Bard | 3:28 |
| Total length: | | | 60:31 |

Japan edition bonus track
| No. | Title | Length |
|---|---|---|
| 17. | "Click Your Heart" | 4:12 |
| Total length: | | 64:44 |

== Charts ==
Chart performance for Casino
| Chart (2000–2002) | Peak position |
|---|---|
| Dutch Albums (Album Top 100) | 28 |
| Swedish Albums (Sverigetopplistan) | 40 |
