= Tess Merkel =

Therese Merkel
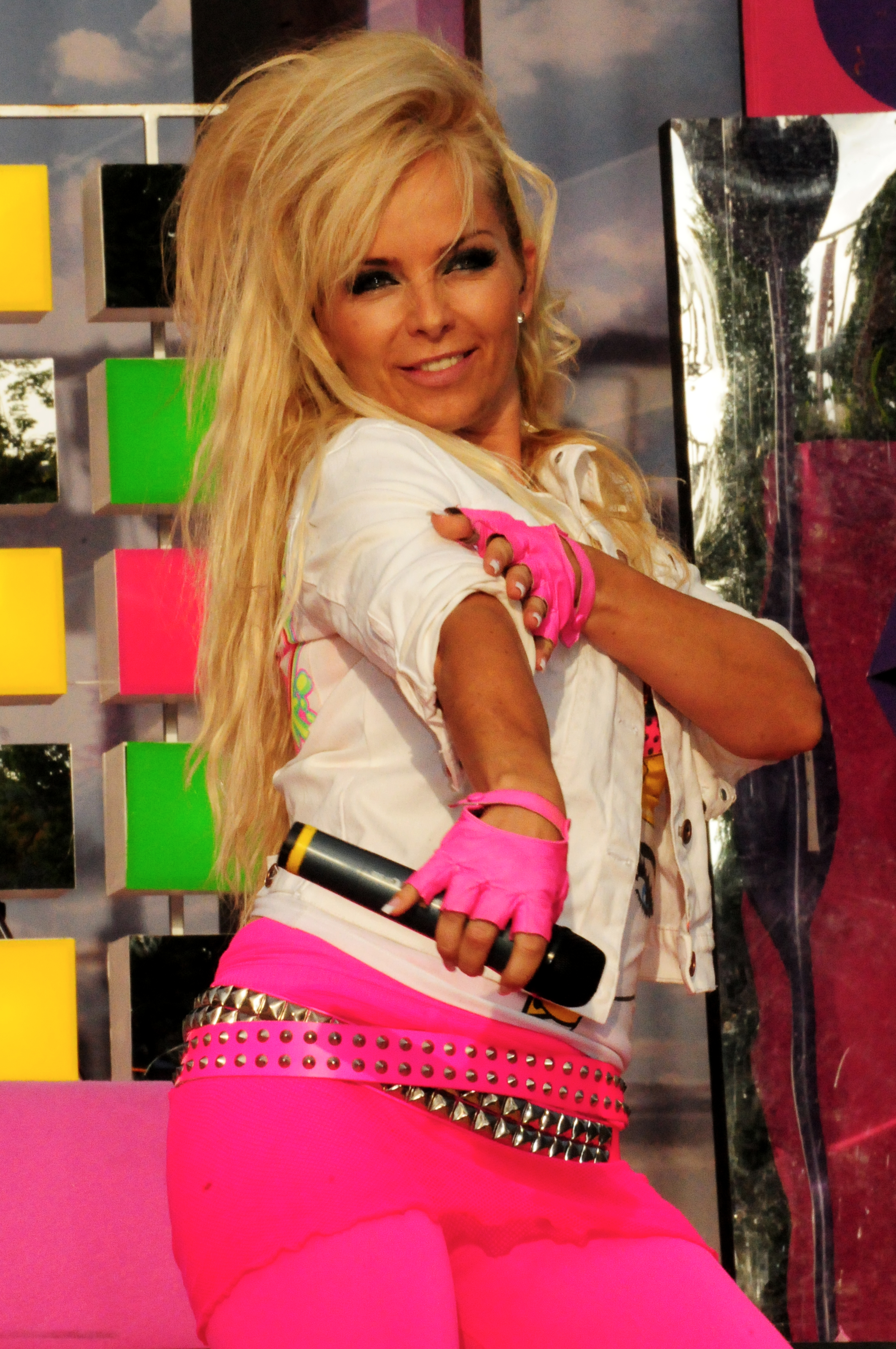
- Tess Merkel in 2009

Background information
- Born: Eva Therese Margaretha Merkel; 18 April 1970 (age 55)
- Origin: Nyköping, Sweden
- Genres: Pop
- Occupations: Singer, Actress

Eva Therese Margaretha Merkel also known as "Tess Merkel" (born 18 April 1970) is a Swedish singer and songwriter who is one of the original members of the pop group Alcazar.

== Career ==
Merkel was born in Nyköping, Sweden. She started her career in a number of musicals and soon landed the job as a showgirl at Wallmans salonger in 1991. She also did some choirgirl jobs for Melodifestivalen, in Melodifestivalen 1993 she did the choir behind Lena Pålsson, in Melodifestivalen 1997 she choired behind her later bandmate Andreas Lundstedt and in Melodifestivalen 2000 she choired behind Avengers during their performance. Merkel herself has participated in Melodifestivalen three times as of 2010: in Melodifestivalen 2003, Melodifestivalen 2005, Melodifestivalen 2009 and in Melodifestivalen 2010, all four times as a member of the popular pop group Alcazar. Merkel has also in 2006 hosted the final of MGP Nordic 2006 a Nordic music competition for kids. She also has an interest for Poker and has been a contestant at the European Poker Tour in Barcelona in 2006. Merkel has won 500.000 (SEK) at the Pokermiljonen in online Poker game. She participated in Melodifestivalen 2021 solo with the song "Good Life", but failed to qualify from the heats.

== Personal life ==
Merkel lives in Stockholm with her two children from her ex-boyfriend Greger Andersson: son Neo (born 2003) and daughter Minya (born 2007). Since 2013 Merkel has been dating British actor, model and businessman Kenny Solomons who is known from Bredbandsbolagets commercials. They married in 2017.

== Discography ==
=== Singles ===
Title	Year	Peak chart positions	Album
Title	Year	SWE	Album
"Good Life"	2021	76	Non-album single
