= Headlines (Alcazar song) =

Single by Alcazar
- Released: 3 March 2010
- Recorded: 2009
- Genre: Nu-disco; Europop
- Length: 3:03
- Label: Universal
- Songwriter(s): Peter Boström; Tony Nilsson

Alcazar singles chronology
"Last Christmas" (2009)	"Headlines" (2010)	"Feel 4 U" (2011)

Audio video
- "Headlines" on YouTube

"Headlines" is a song by Swedish pop group Alcazar. The song was an entry in Melodifestivalen 2010 for the Eurovision Song Contest 2010, where it reached the "Second Chance", which was held on 6 March 2010 at Conventum Arena in Örebro. Alcazar failed to qualify for the final after a public televote. No music video was shot to promote the single afterwards.

== Track listing ==
CD single

1. "Headlines" (radio edit) – 3:03
2. "Headlines" (karaoke version) – 2:59

== Chart performance ==
The song made its debut on the Swedish Singles Chart at number 24 on 5 March 2010. The next week, the song managed to climb to number 10, giving Alcazar another top-10 hit in Sweden.

Chart performance for "Headlines"
Chart (2010)	Peak position
Sweden (Sverigetopplistan)	10
Sweden (Svensktoppslistan)	7¨

== See also ==
- Melodifestivalen 2010
