= Sexual Guarantee =

2001 single by Alcazar

Single by Alcazar

from the album Casino
- Released: 19 November 2001
- Length: 3:34
- Label: RCA; BMG
- Songwriters: G. Nile; A. Bard; B. Edwards; A. Hansson

Alcazar singles chronology
"Ritmo Del Amor" (2000)	"Sexual Guarantee" (2001)	"Don't You Want Me" (2002)

Music video
- "Sexual Guarantee" on YouTube

"Sexual Guarantee" is a song by the Swedish band Alcazar. It was released as the fourth single from their debut studio album, Casino (2000), and samples Chic's 1979 hit "My Forbidden Lover". The song charted across Europe, reaching the top 20 in Belgium, Italy and the Netherlands.

== Chart performance ==
The single was released in Europe, but in different formats and sleeves. For instance, the UK once again made their own sleeves and used their own Alcazar logo. Alcazar's record company in the UK, BMG, heavily promoted "Sexual Guarantee", with promotional posters put up across London. One of the posters used the slogan "Bye Bye Steps, Welcome Alcazar", referring to the sudden disappearance of British pop band Steps.

The first country to release the single was Sweden, then Finland and the rest of Europe followed. Australia released the band's cover of the Human League's "Don't You Want Me" as a single instead.

== Track listing ==
CD single

1. Original version – 3:34
2. Johan S Vocal Club Mix – 5:25
3. Fu-Tourist Remix– 5:35
4. Johan S Dub Mix – 7:27

Cassette single

1. Original version – 3:34
2. Fu-Tourist Remix – 5:35

== Charts ==
Weekly chart performance for "Sexual Guarantee"
Chart (2001–2002)	Peak position
Belgium (Ultratop 50 Flanders)	16
Belgium (Ultratip Bubbling Under Wallonia)	1
Germany (GfK)	72
Italy (FIMI)	17
Netherlands (Dutch Top 40)	18
Netherlands (Single Top 100)	30
Scottish Singles Sales (Official Charts)	33
Sweden (Sverigetopplistan)	28
Switzerland (Schweizer Hitparade)	46
UK Singles (Official Charts)	30
UK Dance (Official Charts)	22

== Release history ==
Release dates and formats for "Sexual Guarantee"
Region	Date	Format(s)	Label(s)	Ref.
Finland	19 November 2001	CD	RCA; BMG	
Europe	26 November 2001	CD	RCA; BMG	
United Kingdom	4 March 2002	12-inch vinyl; CD; cassette	Arista; BMG	
