= Alcazarized =

Studio album by Alcazar
- Released: 6 May 2003
- Recorded: 2002–2003
- Genres: Eurodance; Europop
- Length: 62:32 (excluding pregap track)
- Labels: BMG; RCA

Alcazar chronology
Casino (2000)	Alcazarized (2003)	Dancefloor Deluxe (2004)

Singles from Alcazarized
- 1. "Not a Sinner Nor a Saint" Released: 10 March 2003; 2. "Ménage à Trois" Released: 30 June 2003; 3. "Someday" Released: July 2003; 4. "Love Life" Released: 9 October 2003; 5. "This Is the World We Live In" Released: 2 June 2004; 6. "Physical" Released: 18 October 2004

Alcazarized is the second studio album by Swedish dance group Alcazar. It was released on 6 May 2003 in Sweden, in Europe on 2 August 2004 and in Japan on 20 October 2004, in separate editions, each with a slightly different track listing.

== Release ==
The third single, "Someday", was made as an official song for the 2003 Stockholm Pride festival, which took place from 30 July to 3 August.

"Here I Am" had appeared on Alcazarized, and was used in the promotion of the greatest hits compilation Dancefloor Deluxe, and was released around Christmas 2004. The track failed to make a big impact on the charts, peaking at number 40 in Sweden. However, in neighbouring Finland, it proved much more popular, climbing to number 6 on the Finnish singles chart. The single contains French and Spanish versions of the track, as well as remixes from Groovetemplate, FL and Mark Jason among others.

== Track list ==
Swedish edition
No.	Title	Writer(s)	Length
1.	"Dance with the DJ" (Hidden track)	Anders Hansson, Zero Th!nk-ink	4:06
2.	"I Love the DJ"	G. Samuelson, M. Lundh, Q. Starkie	3:33
3.	"Celebrate the Night"	Andreas Lundstedt, Anders Wollbeck, M. Lindblom	3:51
4.	"Ménage à Trois"	G. Samuelson, M. Lundh, Q. Starkie. L. Robbins	3:50
5.	"Dancefloor Docusoap"	A. Bard, A. Hansson, B. Edwards, N. Rodgers, F. Jacobson, J. Strandkvist	3:28
6.	"Not a Sinner, Nor a Saint"	B. Ljunggren, L. Ahlin, T. Lydell	3:02
7.	"Funky Feet"	Benny Andersson, Björn Ulvaeus (Note: This song was originally recorded by ABBA in July 1976, but never released.)	3:34
8.	"I Go Shopping"	Alexander Bard/Anders Hansson/B.H. Edwards/F. Jacobson/Johan Strandkvist/Nile Rodgers	3:31
9.	"Last Days of Disco"	J. Kinde, Orup, S. Olsson	4:23
10.	"Chemistry"	Aleena Gibson, Anders Wollbeck, Mattias Lindbom	3:28
11.	"Love Life"	Chris Lowe, Neil Tennant	3:53
12.	"Wonderland"	Thomas "Orup" Ericsson	4:47
13.	"Singing to Heaven"	A. Bard, A. Hansson, J. Strandkvist	3:31
14.	"Here I Am"	J. Röhr, M. Sandén	4:48
15.	"Someday"	J. Kinde, Orup, S. Olsson	4:07
16.	"Save My Pride" (Hidden track)	Alexander Bard, Anders Hansson, Johan Strandkvist	4:30
Total length:			62:32

European edition
No.	Title	Writer(s)	Length
1.	"This Is the World We Live In"	A. Banks, A. Bhagavan, B.H. Edwards, M. Rutherford, Nile Rodgers, P. Collins, N. Von der Burg	3:36
2.	"I Love the DJ"	G. Samuelson, M. Lundh, Q. Starkie	3:33
3.	"Physical"	A. Bhagavan, G. Chandler, J. Chambers, J. Helms, L. Henshall, N. Von der Burg	3:31
4.	"Love Life"	Chris Lowe, Neil Tennant	3:55
5.	"Not a Sinner, Nor a Saint"	B. Ljunggren, L. Ahlin, T. Lydell	3:02
6.	"Funky Feet"	Benny Andersson, Björn Ulvaeus	3:34
7.	"I Go Shopping"	Alexander Bard, Anders Hansson, B.H. Edwards, F. Jacobson, Johan Strandkvist, Nile Rodgers	3:31
8.	"Last Days of Disco"	J. Kinde, Orup, S. Olsson	4:23
9.	"Celebrate the Night"	A. Lundstedt, A. Wollbeck, M. Lindblom	3:52
10.	"Singing to Heaven"	Alexander Bard, Anders Hansson, Johan Strandkvist	3:32
11.	"Someday"	J. Kinde, Orup, S. Olsson	4:07
12.	"Crying at the Discoteque" (Bonus track)	Alexander Bard, Anders Hansson, Anders Wollbeck, Bernard Edwards, Michael Goulos, Nile Rodgers	3:54
13.	"Here I am" (Hidden track)	J. Röhr, M. Sandén	4:49
Total length:			49:27

Japan edition
No.	Title	Writer(s)	Length
12.	"Start the Fire"	Billy Joel, Ken Gold, Michael Denne	3:18
13.	"Chemistry"	Aleena Gibson, Anders Wollbeck, Mattias Lindbom	3:28
14.	"Wonderland"	Thomas "Orup" Ericsson	4:47
15.	"Crying at the Discoteque" (Bonus track)	Alexander Bard, Anders Hansson, Anders Wollbeck, Bernard Edwards, Michael Goulos, Nile Rodgers	3:54
16.	"Here I Am" (Hidden track)	J. Röhr, M. Sandén	4:49
Total length:			61:02

== Charts ==
Chart performance for Alcazarized
Chart (2003–2004)	Peak position
Belgian Albums (Ultratop Flanders)	95
German Albums (Offizielle Top 100)	46
Swedish Albums (Sverigetopplistan)	2
Swiss Albums (Schweizer Hitparade)	43

Chart performance for "Someday"
Chart (2003)	Peak position
Swedish Singles Chart	31

Chart performance for "Here I Am"
Chart (2004)	Peak position
Finland (Suomen virallinen lista)	6
Sweden (Sverigetopplistan)	41
