= Physical (Alcazar song) =

Single by Alcazar

from the album Alcazarized and Dancefloor Deluxe
- B-side: "Let's Do the Bump"
- Released: 18 October 2004
- Recorded: 2004
- Genre: Eurodance, pop
- Length: 3:29
- Label: BMG, RCA Records
- Songwriters: Jonas von der Burg, Niclas von der Burg, Anoo Bhagavan, Jimmy Helms, Liam Henshall, Jimmy Chambers, George Chandler

Alcazar singles chronology
"This Is the World We Live In" (2004)	"Physical" (2004)	"Here I Am" (2004)

Music video
- "Alcazar - Physical (Video - Original Version)" on YouTube

"Physical" was released in late 2004 by the Swedish band Alcazar as part of the promotion of the Dancefloor Deluxe compilation. The song was based on a sample of Londonbeat's 1990 hit "I've Been Thinking About You".

The song failed to chart Official Singles Chart in Sweden, but managed a # 3 placing in Finland.

== Music video ==
The video was filmed in and around London's Soho area when the band were in the UK performing at G-A-Y Astoria.

== Formats and track listings ==
These are the formats and track listings of promotional single releases of "Physical".

=== Promo ===
1. Physical 3:30

=== CD single ===
1. Physical 3:30
2. Not A Sinner Nor A Saint (Mikki Remix) 3:35

=== Maxi single ===
1. "Original Version" – 3:30
2. "Soundfactory Club Anthem" – 9:11
3. "Extended Original" – 5:30
4. "Soundfactory Glamour Dub" – 10:12
5. "Mark Jason's Dancefloor Conqueror UK Remix" – 5:38

== Chart performance ==
=== Weekly charts ===
Weekly chart performance for "Physical"
Chart (2004–2005)	Peak position
Austria (Ö3 Austria Top 40)	64
Finland (Suomen virallinen lista)	3
Germany (GfK)	59
Hungary (Dance Top 40)	16
Hungary (Rádiós Top 40)	20
Russia Airplay (TopHit)	36
Switzerland (Schweizer Hitparade)	91

=== Year-end charts ===
Year-end chart performance for "Physical"
Chart (2004)	Position
Russia Airplay (TopHit)	167
