= This Is the World We Live In =

2003 single by Alcazar

Single by Alcazar

from the album Alcazarized
- Released: 2 June 2004
- Length: 3:35
- Label: RCA, BMG
- Songwriters: Bernard Edwards, Nile Rodgers, Phil Collins, Tony Banks, Mike Rutherford, Anoo Bhagavan, Jonas von der Burg
- Producer: Jonas von der Burg

Alcazar singles chronology
"Love Life" (2003)	"This Is the World We Live In" (2004)	"Physical" (2004)

Music video
- "This Is the World We Live In" on YouTube

"This Is the World We Live In" is a song by Swedish band Alcazar. It is the fifth single from their second album, Alcazarized (2003). The song contains an interpolation of Diana Ross's "Upside Down", and the chorus is adapted from the Genesis song "Land of Confusion". It was released in June 2004 and became a hit, peaking at number three in Sweden, topping the charts of Hungary and Ukraine, and entering the top 20 in the Czech Republic, Denmark, Flanders, Italy, Norway and the United Kingdom. In Ukraine, it was the most successful single of 2004.

== Music video ==
A music video was produced to promote the single.

== Track listings ==
- Swedish and European CD single
1. "This Is the World We Live In" (radio edit)
2. "This Is the World We Live In" (extended version)
- UK CD single
1. "This Is the World We Live In" (radio edit) – 3:34
2. "This Is the World We Live In" (extended mix) – 5:57
3. "This Is the World We Live In" (Soundfactory Club Anthem) – 9:06
4. "This Is the World We Live In" (Almighty Mix) – 7:44
5. "This Is the World We Live In" (Soundtrack Drama Dub) – 9:38
- Australian CD single
1. "This Is the World We Live In" (original)
2. "This Is the World We Live In" (extended version)
3. "This Is the World We Live In" (Soundfactory Club Anthem)
4. "This Is the World We Live In" (Almighty Mix)
5. "This Is the World We Live In" (Almighty radio edit)

== Charts ==
=== Weekly charts ===
Chart (2004)	Peak position
Australia (ARIA)	31
Austria (Ö3 Austria Top 40)	37
Belgium (Ultratop 50 Flanders)	17
Belgium (Ultratip Bubbling Under Wallonia)	3
CIS Airplay (TopHit)	3
Czech Republic (IFPI)	7
Denmark (Tracklisten)	14
Germany (GfK)	30
Hungary (Rádiós Top 40)	1
Hungary (Dance Top 40)	9
Ireland (IRMA)	28
Ireland Dance (IRMA)	4
Italy (FIMI)	11
Netherlands (Single Top 100)	75
Norway (VG-lista)	16
Romania (Romanian Top 100)	62
Russia Airplay (TopHit)	9
Scotland Singles (Official Charts)	14
Sweden (Sverigetopplistan)	3
Switzerland (Schweizer Hitparade)	30
Ukraine Airplay (TopHit)	1
UK Singles (Official Charts)	15
UK Dance (Official Charts)	21

Chart (2024)	Peak position
Poland (Polish Airplay Top 100)	79

=== Year-end charts ===
Chart (2004)	Position
CIS Airplay (TopHit)	4
Hungary (Rádiós Top 40)	16
Russia Airplay (TopHit)	19
Sweden (Hitlistan)	25
Ukraine Airplay (TopHit)	1

Chart (2005)	Position
Hungary (Rádiós Top 40)	31

== Certifications ==
Region	Certification	Certified units/sales
Sweden (GLF)	Gold	10,000^{^}
^{^} Shipments figures based on certification alone.

== Release history ==
Region	Date	Format(s)	Label(s)	Ref.
Sweden	2 June 2004	CD	RCA; BMG	
Germany	12 June 2004	CD	RCA; BMG	
Finland	16 June 2004	CD	RCA; BMG	
Denmark	21 June 2004	CD	RCA; BMG	
Australia	16 August 2004	CD	RCA; BMG	
United Kingdom	20 September 2004	CD	RCA; BMG	
