= Not a Sinner nor a Saint =

2003 single by Alcazar

Single by Alcazar

from the album Alcazarized
- Released: 10 March 2003
- Length: 3:01
- Label: BMG; RCA
- Composer(s): Tommy Lydell; Bobby Ljunggren
- Lyricist(s): Lotta Ahlin
- Producer(s): Anders Hansson; Johan S

Alcazar singles chronology
"Don't You Want Me" (2002)	"Not a Sinner nor a Saint" (2003)	"Ménage à Trois" (2003)

Audio video
- "Not A Sinner Nor A Saint" on YouTube

"Not a Sinner nor a Saint" is a Eurodance song performed by Swedish band Alcazar. This was the first single to give a preview of the then-forthcoming album Alcazarized, but was only released in Sweden. Nevertheless, the song was added at radio stations around Europe.

== Melodifestivalen 2003 ==
In early 2003, Alcazar entered the Swedish pre-selections for the Eurovision Song Contest. They ended up in third place. The single reached number one on the singles chart, the Swedish Airplay List, "Tracks", and was Alcazar's first number-one of two in their home country. The single was released in a cardboard sleeve with an ultra glossy coating. Due to high public demand, some of the pressings did not get the glossy finish.

== Track listings ==
CD single

1. Radio Edit – 3:01
2. Disco Club Mix – 4:45
3. FL's Heaven and Hell Remix – 4:22
4. Sing-a-Long Version – 3:00

== Charts ==
=== Weekly charts ===
Weekly chart performance for "Not a Sinner nor a Saint"
Chart (2003)	Peak position
Sweden (Sverigetopplistan)	1

=== Year-end charts ===
Year-end chart performance for "Not a Sinner nor a Saint"
Chart (2003)	Position
Sweden (Hitlistan)	17

== Certifications ==
Region	Certification	Certified units/sales
Sweden (GLF)	Gold	15,000^{^}
^{^} Shipments figures based on certification alone.

== See also ==
- Melodifestivalen 2003
