= Alcazar (group) =

Swedish disco group

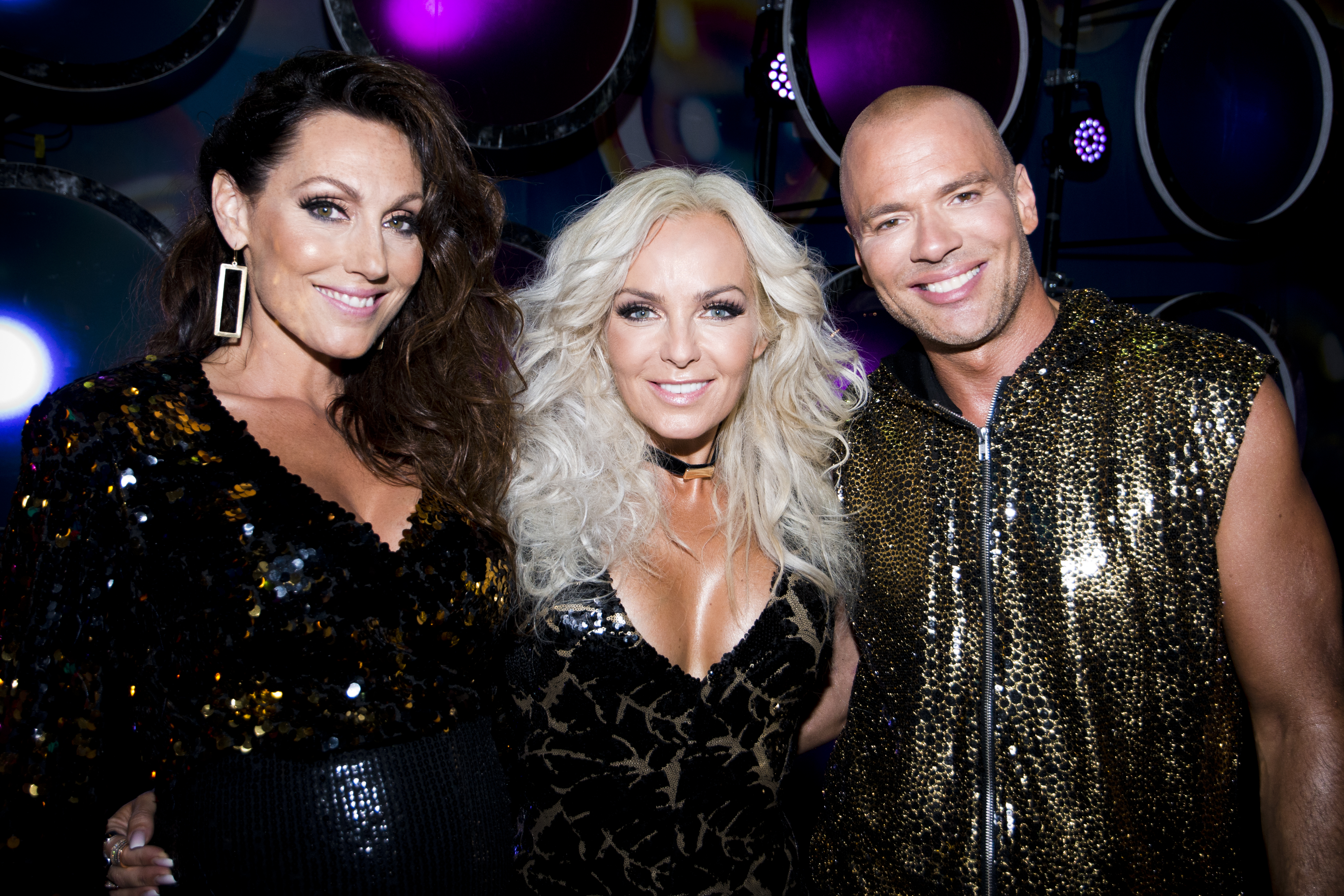
- Alcazar at Sommarkrysset 2016

Background information
- Origin: Stockholm, Sweden
- Genres: Nu-disco; dance-pop; Europop; schlager
- Years active: 1998–2005, 2007–2011, 2013–2018, 2024
- Labels: Universal; Sony; Edel
- Members: Andreas Lundstedt; Tess Merkel; Lina Hedlund
- Past members: Annika "Annikafiore" Kjærgaard; Magnus Carlsson
- Website: Alcazar booking webpage

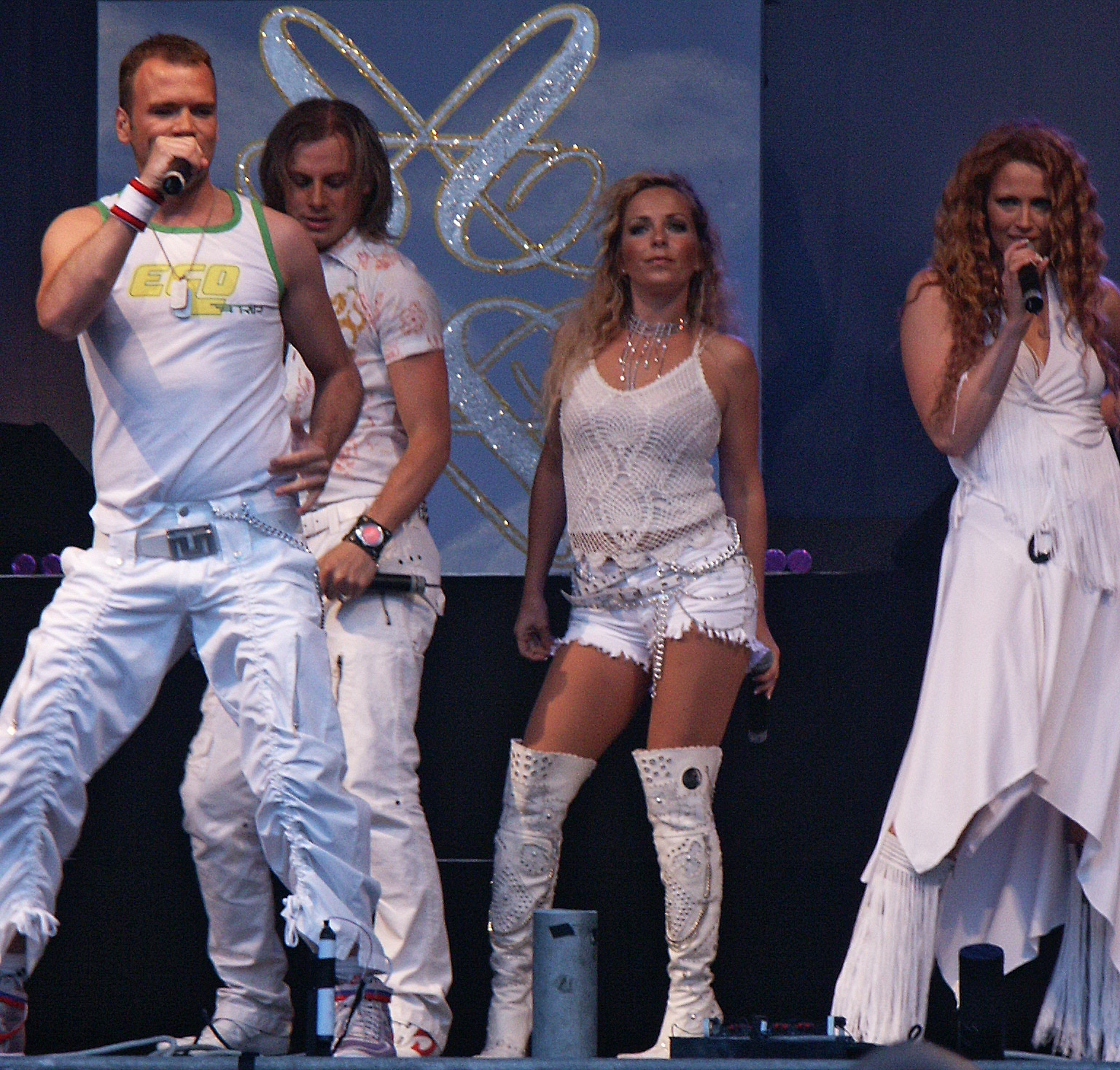
Alcazar during a concert in 2004

Alcazar is a Swedish nu-disco group formed in Stockholm. The group is one of Sweden's most successful music acts, both nationally and internationally, achieving a series of hits since their debut single in 1999. Globally, Alcazar sold over 12 million records between 2001 and 2004. The group gained international recognition in 2000 with their song "Crying at the Discoteque", which charted in the US, Brazil, Australia, Japan, and most European countries.

Alcazar disbanded in August 2011 after a concert at Stockholm Pride. They reunited in 2013 ahead of Melodifestivalen 2014 before disbanding again in 2018. Since then, they have only reunited on rare occasions.

== Band career ==
The group formed in 1998 with three members: Andreas Lundstedt, Tess Merkel, and Annika "Annikafiore" Kjærgaard (née Johansson). Their first single, "Shine On", was a hit in Sweden, but it was with their second release, "Crying at the Discoteque" (which heavily sampled Sheila and B. Devotion's 1979 hit "Spacer"), that they achieved success across Europe.

Both singles appeared on their album, Casino, which was written and produced by fellow Swedes Alexander Bard and Anders Hansson.

Later editions of Casino contain a cover of The Human League's hit "Don't You Want Me", which also served as the third single from the album. In the United States, Alcazar gained moderate success. "Crying at the Discoteque" peaked at No. 44, and "Don't You Want Me" reached No. 30 on the Hot Dance Music/Club Play.

In December 2002, Lundstedt's boyfriend at the time, Magnus Carlsson, joined the group. Their second album, Alcazarized, was released in Sweden in 2003 and became a big hit. It was released internationally in 2004 with new cover artwork and a slightly different track list. In September 2004, Alcazar released "This Is the World We Live In." The song samples Diana Ross's 1980 hit single "Upside Down" and reuses the lyrics and melody from Genesis' 1986 single "Land of Confusion".

Their follow-up single, "Physical", also sampled an older hit: Londonbeat's "I've Been Thinking About You". The singles were followed by the album Dancefloor Deluxe, which was released in Sweden in August 2004. In the winter of 2004/2005, they released the Christmas single "Here I Am". Alcazar enjoyed considerable success in 2004 in their home country, Sweden.

In 2005, the single "Start the Fire" was released. During the filming of its music video, Kjærgaard had an accident in which she broke her foot.

In the autumn of 2005, the band decided to take a break. Lundstedt pursued musicals and took on the lead role in Saturday Night Fever, while Tess became a professional poker player.

In May 2007, the band performed in London at the nightclub G-A-Y, alongside Swedish colleagues BWO and Army of Lovers, with their friend Lina Hedlund joining them on stage. This collaboration was highly successful, and a few months later, the "New Alcazar" was formed.

In January 2008, their comeback single "We Keep on Rockin'", written and produced by Anders Hansson, was released. The single quickly became a hit, and just a week after its release, it achieved gold status in sales. In March 2009, their new album, Disco Defenders, was released in Sweden. The album consists of two discs. Disc one features 12 brand new tracks, including "We Keep on Rockin'", "Burning", "Harlem Nights", and "Stay the Night". Disc two includes 11 of their greatest hits, such as "Crying at the Discoteque", "This Is the World We Live In", and "Don't You Want Me". Disco Defenders received positive reviews from Swedish critics.

In 2010, Alcazar recorded a duet with British pop group Same Difference, titled "Karma Karma". It was included on Same Difference's second album, The Rest Is History. Although not officially released as a single, the song charted on Swedish iTunes due to Alcazar's popularity in their home country.

In August 2014, they released the single, "Good Lovin".

The band reunited again to perform at the Eurovision Song Contest 2024 in Malmö as an interval act in the final.

== Melodifestivalen ==
Alcazar has participated in Melodifestivalen, the annual competition that selects Sweden's entries for the Eurovision Song Contest, on five occasions. In 2003, their song "Not a Sinner, Nor a Saint" initially failed to qualify for the final but received a wildcard in the second chance round, ultimately finishing 3rd overall. Despite not winning, the song became the biggest hit among all the participating entries in Melodifestivalen 2003. It was Alcazar's first number-one single in Sweden and was certified Gold.

In early 2005, Alcazar was offered a spot in the United Kingdom's national selection for the Eurovision Song Contest 2005 but declined the offer. Instead, they entered Melodifestivalen 2005 with the disco track "Alcastar". As in 2003, they initially failed to qualify for the final but advanced through the second chance semi-final. Once again, the group finished in 3rd place in the final, which was won by Martin Stenmarck's song "Las Vegas". Nevertheless, "Alcastar" became a hit, reaching number one in Sweden and marking Alcazar's second chart-topping single.

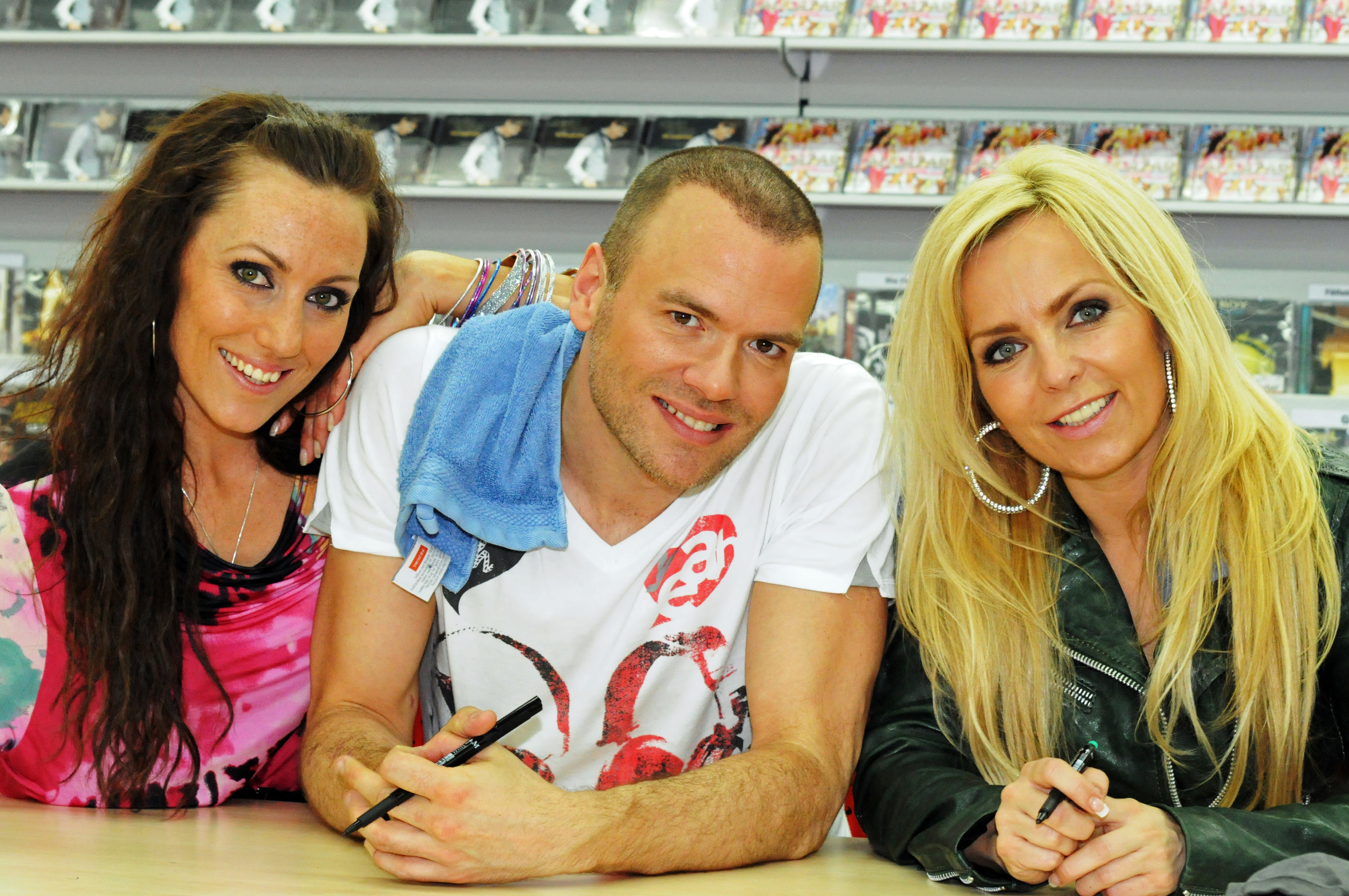
Alcazar in 2009

Alcazar participated in Melodifestivalen 2009 with the song "Stay the Night". After performing during the first semifinal at Scandinavium in Gothenburg, they finished in the top two for the first time, qualifying directly for the final. In the final held at Globen, Alcazar placed third with the regional juries and fourth in the televote, ultimately finishing fifth overall. The song peaked at number two on the Swedish Singles Chart, marking another Top 10 single for Alcazar in Sweden. The group also participated in Melodifestivalen 2010 with the song "Headlines", written and produced by Tony Nilsson and Peter Boström. They made it to the second chance round but failed to reach the final.

On 23 February 2013, Alcazar reunited for a "best of hits" performance in Melodifestivalen 2013 in Malmö, joined by Swedish singer Danny Saucedo.

On 28 November 2013, it was announced that the band would compete for a fifth time in Melodifestivalen 2014 with the song "Blame It on the Disco". They competed in the fourth semi-final and advanced to the final at Friends Arena on 8 March. They finished in third place once again.

On 1 May, it was revealed that Alcazar would serve as spokespersons, presenting the voting results for Sweden in the Eurovision 2014 final on 10 May.

== Break and line-up changes ==
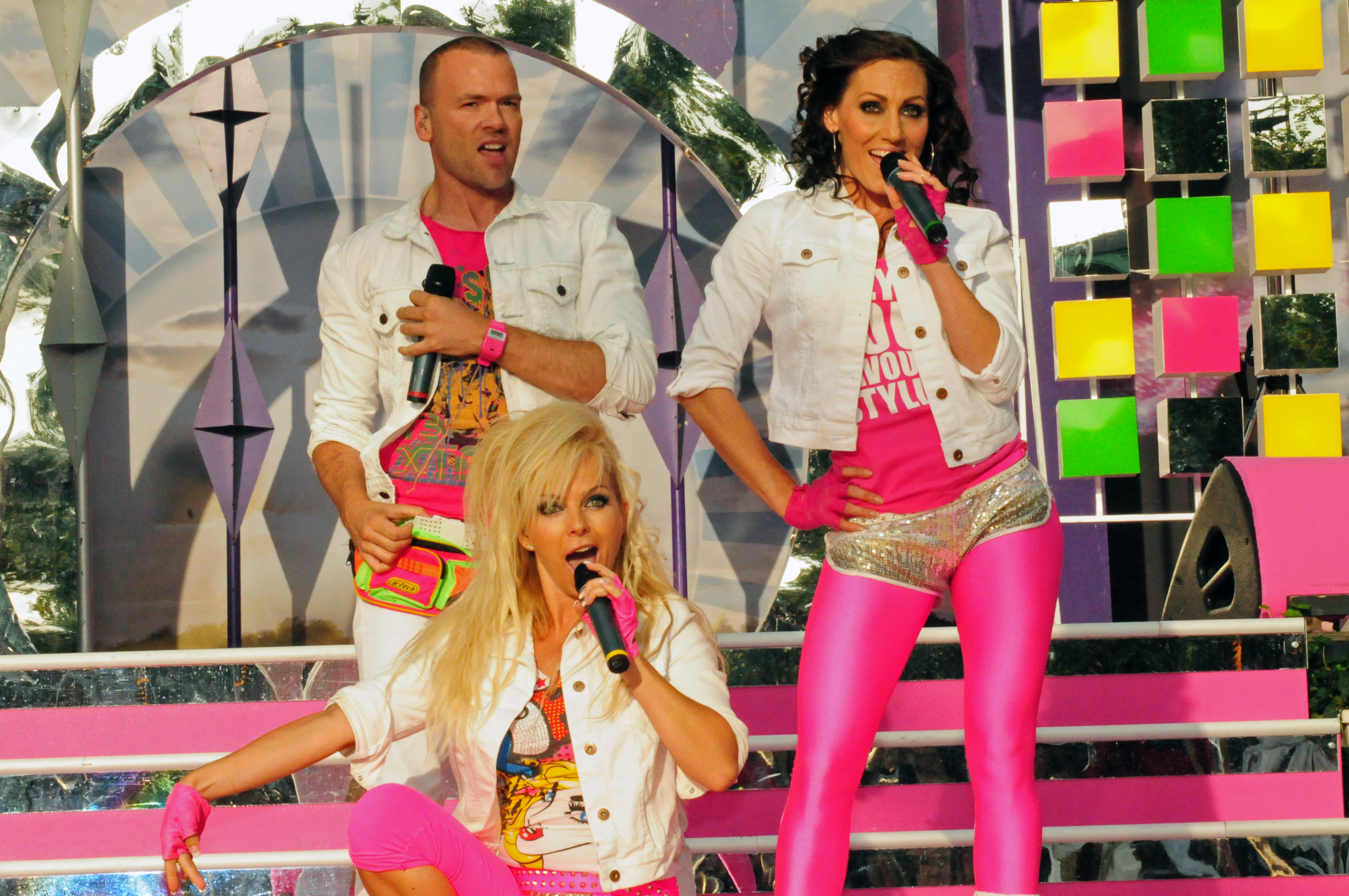
Alcazar's most recent line-up performing in 2009

The band announced that they needed a break in March 2005. Lundstedt stated that the band would return in the summer of 2007. In the meantime, the male members pursued solo careers. Lundstedt participated in the Eurovision Song Contest 2006 as a member of six4one, a multinational band formed specifically to represent Switzerland at the contest, while Carlsson took part individually in the Swedish Melodifestivalen on two occasions.

Lina Hedlund was announced as the replacement for Annikafiore. The band now includes Tess Merkel and Hedlund as female vocalists, with Lundstedt serving as the male vocalist.

== Performances ==
Alcazar reformed in July 2007 to perform at the London Astoria as part of a celebration of Swedish music organized by producer Alexander Bard, known for his work with Army of Lovers. During the G-A-Y event on 21 July 2007, they performed alongside BWO and a reformed cult band, Army of Lovers. The set included three songs: "This Is the World We Live In", "Start the Fire", and "Crying at the Discoteque". Despite the successful performance, Andreas Lundstedt did not confirm any plans for a full reunion, only suggesting future one-off appearances at G-A-Y events.

The band performed again on 5 July 2008 at G-A-Y Astoria for Pride London 2008, singing "This Is the World We Live In", "Sexual Guarantee/Don't You Want Me", and "Crying at the Discoteque" after BWO. They concluded the performance with a cover of "Funkytown" by Lipps Inc., featuring BWO on stage. Alcazar also made an appearance on 28 June 2008 in Bologna for the Italian national Gay Pride parade. On 31 December 2008, they returned to G-A-Y at its new venue, Heaven.

All five members of the band reunited at EuroPride 2018. In 2020, Alcazar briefly reformed to perform at the Melodifestivalen 2020 Hall of Fame, which Lina hosted. Additionally, they reunited to perform as an interval act during the final of the Eurovision Song Contest 2024.

== Discography ==
- Casino (2000)
- Alcazarized (2003)
- Disco Defenders (2009)

| Preceded by (Spain) David Bisbal (Spain) Davinia | OGAE Second Chance Contest winner 2003; 2005 | Succeeded by (Spain) Davinia (Slovenia) Saša Lendero |
