= Crying at the Discoteque =

2000 single by Alcazar

Single by Alcazar

from the album Casino
- Released: 10 April 2000
- Length: 3:50
- Label: BMG; Ariola
- Composers: Bernard Edwards; Nile Rodgers
- Lyricists: Alexander Bard; Anders Hansson; Anders Wollbeck; Michael Goulos
- Producers: Alexander Bard; Anders Hansson; Johan S

Alcazar singles chronology
"Shine On" (1999)	"Crying at the Discoteque" (2000)	"Ritmo Del Amor" (2000)

Music video
- "Crying at the Discoteque" on YouTube

"Crying at the Discoteque" is a song by the Swedish band Alcazar from their debut studio album, Casino (2000). The track samples Sheila and B. Devotion's 1979 hit "Spacer". Alexander Bard produced the song and can be heard in the middle of this song. Released in April 2000, "Crying at the Discoteque" became Alcazar's first international hit single the following year, reaching number one in Hungary and the top 10 in Flanders, Germany, Ireland, Italy, and Switzerland.

== Music video ==
A music video was produced to promote the single. It shows Alcazar as a 1970s retro band during the making of the video, against a setting that suggests either a deserted planet or a wasteland. They wear futuristic outfits with the backing dancers sporting animal masks (including a horse head mask). During the filming things go wrong with the set designers getting in the way, the band disagreeing with the director, having script changes and general other mishaps.

== Track listings ==
- Swedish CD single
1. "Crying at the Discoteque" (radio edit) – 3:50
2. "Crying at the Discoteque" (extended version) – 4:58
3. "Crying at the Discoteque" (DeTox dub) – 6:29
4. "Crying at the Discoteque" (Pinocchio Tesco Mix) – 4:47
- Swedish 12-inch single

A1. "Crying at the Discoteque" (extended version) – 4:58
A2. "Crying at the Discoteque" (Illicit remix) – 7:13
B1. "Crying at the Discoteque" (Pinocchio Tesco Mix) – 4:47
B2. "Crying at the Discoteque" (Mind Trap's disco dub) – 7:57

- European CD single
1. "Crying at the Discoteque" (radio edit) – 3:50
2. "Crying at the Discoteque" (extended version) – 4:58
- UK cassette single
1. "Crying at the Discoteque" (radio edit) – 3:50
2. "Crying at the Discoteque" (Pinocchio Tesco Mix) – 4:47
- UK CD single
1. "Crying at the Discoteque" (radio edit) – 3:50
2. "Crying at the Discoteque" (Illicit remix) – 7:13
3. "Crying at the Discoteque" (Ivan's X Mix) – 7:18
- UK 12-inch single

A1. "Crying at the Discoteque" (extended version) – 4:58
B1. "Crying at the Discoteque" (DeTox dub) – 6:29
B2. "Crying at the Discoteque" (Illicit remix) – 7:13

- Australian CD single
1. "Crying at the Discoteque" (radio edit) – 3:50
2. "Crying at the Discoteque" (extended version) – 4:58
3. "Crying at the Discoteque" (Illicit remix) – 7:13
4. "Crying at the Discoteque" (Mind Trap's disco dub) – 7:57

== Charts ==
=== Weekly charts ===
Weekly chart performance for "Crying at the Discoteque"
Chart (2000–2002)	Peak position
Australia (ARIA)	14
Australian Dance (ARIA)	1
Austria (Ö3 Austria Top 40)	14
Belgium (Ultratop 50 Flanders)	2
Belgium (Ultratop 50 Wallonia)	11
Europe (Eurochart Hot 100)	16
Finland (Suomen virallinen lista)	14
France (SNEP)	64
Germany (GfK)	3
Hungary (Mahasz)	1
Ireland (IRMA)	6
Ireland Dance (IRMA)	1
Italy (FIMI)	4
Netherlands (Dutch Top 40)	12
Netherlands (Single Top 100)	14
Scotland Singles (OCC)	19
Spain (Promusicae)	16
Sweden (Sverigetopplistan)	29
Switzerland (Schweizer Hitparade)	7
UK Singles (OCC)	13
US Dance Club Songs (Billboard)	44

=== Year-end charts ===
2001 year-end chart performance for "Crying at the Discoteque"
Chart (2001)	Position
Belgium (Ultratop 50 Flanders)	27
Belgium (Ultratop 50 Wallonia)	81
Brazil (Crowley)	32
Europe (Eurochart Hot 100)	65
Germany (Media Control)	25
Ireland (IRMA)	82
Netherlands (Dutch Top 40)	43
Netherlands (Single Top 100)	61
Switzerland (Schweizer Hitparade)	37

2002 year-end chart performance for "Crying at the Discoteque"
Chart (2002)	Position
Australia (ARIA)	83
Australian Dance (ARIA)	11

== Certifications ==
Certifications and sales for "Crying at the Discoteque"
Region	Certification	Certified units/sales
Belgium (BRMA)	Gold	25,000^{*}
Germany (BVMI)	Gold	250,000^{^}
Switzerland (IFPI Switzerland)	Gold	20,000^{^}
United Kingdom (BPI) Sales since 2004	Silver	200,000^{‡}
^{*} Sales figures based on certification alone.^{^} Shipments figures based on certification alone.^{‡} Sales+streaming figures based on certification alone.

== Release history ==
Release dates and formats for "Crying at the Discoteque"
Region	Date	Format(s)	Label(s)	Ref.
Sweden	10 April 2000	CD	Ariola; BMG	
Finland	2 May 2000	CD	Ariola; BMG	
Europe	16 July 2001	CD	BMG	
United Kingdom	26 November 2001	12-inch vinyl; CD; cassette	Arista; BMG	
Australia	28 January 2002	CD	BMG	

== Sophie Ellis-Bextor version ==
In September 2020, British singer Sophie Ellis-Bextor released a cover version as a single to promote her greatest hits album Songs from the Kitchen Disco.

=== Music video ===
The song's music video was directed by Sophie Muller and was filmed in a day in seven London music venues: Bush Hall, Apollo Theatre, St Moritz, Clapham Grand, Heaven, Omeara, and the O2. In the clip, Sophie performs the song on stage to empty rooms, raising awareness of the effect that the COVID-19 pandemic was having on the live events industry at the time.

=== Track listing ===
- Digital download/streaming
1. "Crying at the Discotheque" – 3:51

=== Charts ===
Weekly chart performance for "Crying at the Discotheque"
Chart (2020)	Peak position
Scotland Singles (OCC)	35
UK Singles Downloads (OCC)	13
