= Neveroddoreven =

Studio album by I Monster
- Released: 21 July 2003
- Recorded: 2003
- Label: Dharma
- Producer: Dean Honer; Jarrod Gosling

I Monster chronology
These Are Our Children (1999)	Neveroddoreven (2003)	A Dense Swarm of Ancient Stars (2009)

Neveroddoreven: Remodeled

Professional ratings
Review scores
Source	Rating
Muzik	3/5 stars

Neveroddoreven (sometimes stylised as NeveroddoreveN) is the second studio album by English electronic music duo I Monster. It was originally released on 21 July 2003 by Instant Karma sublabel Dharma Records during "a period of transition for the band's label". It was recorded in the home studio of band member Dean Honer. The title is a palindrome.

"The Blue Wrath" was used in the opening of the 2004 British comedy Shaun of the Dead and appeared on the movie's soundtrack. The I Monster version of "Daydream in Blue" was used as theme music for the 2002 French action movie Steal and appeared in a television commercial for the Ford Focus ST in 2005. The song was also used in the 2016 episode "eps2.0_unm4sk-pt1.tc" in season 2 of Mr. Robot, and the 2022 episode "Half Loop" in season 1 of Severance. In his review of the album for Jockey Slut, Ben Mortimer said that it contained "playful, twisted pop tunes."

== Neveroddoreven: Remodeled ==
The album was re-released in 2004 by Instant Karma with different album artwork and a revised track list appealing to the label's perception of popular demand. While the word Remodeled does not officially appear on the album, it is often used to help distinguish it from the original. "Hey Mrs." was replaced with a remix that gained popularity through use in advertisements, including commercials for Absolut Vodka and the television series Eureka. A small section of "A Scarecrow's Tale" was removed, a small section of "Stobart's Blues" was also removed, "The Backseat of My Car" was also remixed, and "The Blue Wrath" was expanded.

== Track listing ==
All tracks written, produced, and performed by Dean Honer and Jarrod Gosling unless otherwise noted.

Neveroddoreven track listing
No.	Title	Length
0.	"Dinner Jazz" (hidden pregap track, which is silent until 0:29)	2:51
1.	"Some Thing's Coming"	3:27
2.	"Daydream in Blue"	3:39
3.	"Hey Mrs."	4:16
4.	"Everyone's a Loser"	3:16
5.	"Heaven"	3:54
6.	"Who Is She?"	3:31
7.	"I Missed You So"	0:56
8.	"Stobart's Blues"	4:41
9.	"The Backseat of My Car"	4:14
10.	"A Scarecrow's Tale"	0:49
11.	"These Are Our Children"	4:08
12.	"The Blue Wrath"	1:33
13.	"Sunny Delights"	4:40
14.	"Cells"	4:29
15.	"Big End" (song ends at 1:40, includes hidden track "Lucifer You Are a Devil", which begins at 3:40)	6:30

2004 reissue
No.	Title	Length
0.	"Cells" (not included on the downloaded version or the 20th anniversary reissue)	6:00
1.	"Some Thing's Coming"	3:27
2.	"Daydream in Blue"	3:40
3.	"Hey Mrs. [Glamour Puss Mix]"	4:38
4.	"Everyone's a Loser"	3:15
5.	"Heaven"	3:54
6.	"Who Is She?"	3:30
7.	"A Scarecrow's Tale"	0:42
8.	"Stobart's Blues"	4:20
9.	"The Backseat of My Car [Sticky Black Vinyl Mix]"	3:01
10.	"These Are Our Children"	4:06
11.	"Sunny Delights"	4:50
12.	"The Blue Wrath [Extended Version]" (song ends at 2:29, includes hidden track "Lucifer You Are a Devil", which begins at 3:02)	5:54

20th anniversary reissue
No.	Title	Length
12.	"The Blue Wrath"	2:29
13.	"The Weather"	4:04
14.	"The Desert"	3:38
15.	"Won't Give Your Love"	2:44
16.	"Daydream in Blue (Acoustic)"	4:00

Genius version of the 20th anniversary reissue
No.	Title	Length
12.	"The Blue Wrath"	2:29
13.	"The Desert"	3:38
14.	"Won't You Give Your Love"	2:44
15.	"The Great Soul Destroyer"	4:40
16.	"The Weather"	3:37
17.	"I Spider"	2:38
18.	"Daydream In Blue (Acoustic)"	4:00
19.	"Heaven (Silicone Dream Mix)"	3:44
20.	"The Backseat of My Car (Original Mix)"	4:14
21.	"Electricalove"	4:07
22.	"I'm a Cowboy"	4:08
23.	"Cells" (Here instead of as the zeroth track)	4:29
24.	"Big End" (song ends at 1:40, may include hidden track "Lucifer You Are a Devil", which may begin at 3:40)	6:30

Notes

- "Daydream in Blue" samples "Daydream" as performed by the Gunter Kallmann Choir
- "Heaven" samples "When You Are Gone" by Jim Reeves
- "Who Is She?" samples "The Vengeance of She (Who Is She?)" composed by Mario Nascimbene, with vocals from Bob Fields, from the soundtrack of the 1968 film The Vengeance of She.
- The backing music of "The Blue Wrath" is taken from one of the rhythm soundbanks of the legendary British instrument the mellotron
- "Sunny Delights" samples "Sunny" (Bobby Hebb) performed by Val Doonican

== Personnel ==
=== I Monster ===
- Dean Honer
- Jarrod Gosling

=== Additional musicians ===
- Richard Hawley – guitar (track 3, 4, 8)
- Fred de Fred – additional guitar (track 3, 2004 reissue)
- Nesreen Shah – backing vocals (track 4)
- Duncan Wheat – guitar (track 4)
- Tiana Krahn – backing vocals (track 5)
- Marion Benoist – vocals (track 9, 13)
- Simon Stafford – trombone (track 9)
- Julia Roddison – vocals (track 11)
- Ruth Myczko – vocals (track 11)
- Pupils of the Yorkshire School of Performing Arts – backing vocals (track 11)
- Dave Williamson – bass guitar (track 14)
- Ross Orton – drums (track 15)
