= The Portraits (music duo) =

Music duo

- Genres: Acoustic Pop
- Years active: 2005–present
- Labels: Lifelines Music
- Members: Jeremy Millington; Lorraine Reilly Millington
- Website: www.theportraitsmusic.com

The Portraits are a musical duo based in Wells, Somerset, consisting of husband and wife songwriters Jeremy Millington and Lorraine Reilly Millington. They play as a two-piece outfit or accompanied primarily by orchestral musicians, and have a strong presence on the live music scene in the UK, including appearances at festivals such as Glastonbury Festival, and numerous radio and television appearances.

== History ==
Formed in 2005 by Anglo-Irish husband and wife song writing duo Jeremy and Lorraine Millington while they were living in La Rochelle, The Portraits spent a decade playing in small venues across the UK and in France, where they began to build a following and coverage in the press. Sud Ouest (newspaper) wrote of their fusion of "jazz with a folk accent". Their early self-released music was often favourably received by critics: Nancy Dunham of Folking.com wrote in her review of the duo's 2015 album, "'Lions And Butterflies' proves that music is not dead, as Sinead O'Connor and others lament. It just needs to be championed" and Ian Cripps of FATEA magazine described the same new release as "an album of sublime music and rock solid social commentary". Rock n Reel magazine gave the band's 2017 album 'Global Heartbeat' a positive review, stating "Their stature has grown, along with a deep sense of history and what activism means".

In 2016, their tribute song to Jo Cox MP, Nobody Can Ever Murder Love, led to an invitation to perform live on Clare Balding's Good Morning Sunday on BBC Radio 2 on 23 April 2017 and regular rotation of the song and other material by the duo on the station. In December 2020, The Portraits joined forces with a COVID-19 support group on Facebook, Shine A Light To Fight Coronavirus, to release a seasonal cover of Together In Electric Dreams by Philip Oakey and Giorgio Moroder. The song was produced by Jeremy and Lorraine Millington using contributions from members of a Somerset choir, The Skylarks, and a group of orchestral players who were friends of the Millingtons. Their 14-year-old daughter Ciara Mill sang the main vocal line. All musical performances were recorded on video in the performers' homes during the November 2020 lockdown, from a musical score by Jeremy Millington, who then compiled the parts to create the final single. The video, by filmmaker Harry Steele, featured the faces of 155 people, mostly from the UK, who had died during the 2020 pandemic.

The single reached no 27 on the Official Charts Company download singles chart on Christmas Day 2020 and no 2 on the iTunes chart in the days leading up to Christmas 2020 and received endorsements from celebrities Stephen Fry, who described the song as "immensely touching", Midge Ure and Matt Lucas amongst others. When playing it on his BBC Radio 2 show, Steve Wright (DJ) said "This is a fantastic version...I would give this, if I had to give 5 stars, I'd give 5 stars. 5 out of 5!" It also led to The Portraits being interviewed on ITV (TV network)'s This Morning (TV programme) on 15 December 2020 and Channel 5 (British TV channel)'s Jeremy Vine (TV programme) on 17 December 2020 and additionally, coverage in the Irish Independent and many local newspapers around the country. Despite a promising campaign to get the single to the coveted Christmas Number 1 spot which led several UK bookmakers to slash their odds on this outcome in the week before Christmas and BBC News to list Together In Electric Dreams as one of the main challengers, like many of its fellow contenders, the single lost out to LadBaby's third successive Christmas Number 1, Don't Stop Me Eating.

In 2021, Lola Young was chosen by retailer John Lewis Partnership to cover Together In Electric Dreams for their Christmas advertisement, with a slowed down arrangement which saw The Portraits accusing the retailer of copying them and their version of the song. Whilst John Lewis maintained their position that no copying of The Portraits' arrangement took place, in late November the retailer made a substantial, undisclosed, donation to two major charities to which The Portraits had donated all the proceeds from their version of the song in 2020, Mind and Cruse Bereavement Support.

== Discography ==
=== Albums ===
- Kin (2006)
- Timescape (2008)
- The Blushing Of A World In White (2010)
- Counterbalance (2012)
- Life In Sepia (2013)
- Lions And Butterflies (2015)
- Global Heartbeat (2017)
- For Our Times (2019)

=== Singles ===
- Daisy Chain (2012)
- The Rest Of Time (2014)
- Walls Of Silence (2015)
- Moon Song (2015)
- Nobody Can Ever Murder Love (2017)
- A Different Corner (2017)
- Harmonise (2019)
- Except For Me (2019)
- Together In Electric Dreams (2020)
- Photograph (2021)
