= Hiem =

- Origin: Sheffield, England
- Genres: Dance, electronica
- Years active: 1999–present
- Labels: Nang/Startalk International/Eskimo/Crosstown Rebel/Relish
- Members: David "Bozz" Boswell; Nick "Nico" Eastwood
- Website: www.hiemofficial.co.uk

Hiem are an electronic dance duo from Sheffield, England, consisting of Nick "Nico" Eastwood and David "Bozz" Boswell.

== Career ==
Hiem's music mixes dance, electronica, and pop. When the duo plays live, the full band includes Andrew Stenton on drums and Joe Milnes on guitar and keyboards. They have remixed for The Lovers, Pink Grease, and Norwegian duo Ost & Kjex, amongst others. Hiem have a sizeable following both from the underground dance music scene and also from the more mainstream indie kids. They have recorded live sessions for Xfm and for Steve Lamacq on BBC Radio 1.

As well as the singles listed below, Hiem have appeared on compilations including Adam Beyer's Fabric 22, Flexipop, Northern Electronic, The Electronic Bible 1 and 2, The Ministry of Sound Chill Out Sessions, and Time Out's The Other Side of London compilation, mixed by Damian Lazarus.

In 2011, the duo released their album Escape from Division Street which was inspired by a street of over-priced shops in Sheffield. It contained 12 tracks of disco-based music and took several years to create.

In 2009, Hiem released the 12" single "Niteflyte" on the Sheffield label Society. On 6 February 2012, Hiem released the single "2AM" featuring Philip Oakey. The 2013 release of Escape from Division Street featured collaborations with Roots Manuva and Philip Oakey.

On 27 October 2017, Hiem released their third album Hotspace on Nang Records.

== Members ==
Nick "Nicco" Eastwood was a former member of Sheffield band Venini.

David "Bozz" Boswell is from North Wales and moved to Sheffield via Liverpool. He was a collaborator with Sheffield collective All Seeing I. He is also a DJ and records under the alias of Bozzwell for different labels, including Suicide Recordings and Firm Records Koln.

Live shows feature Andy Stenton on drums and Joe Fernandez on guitar/synths.

== Discography ==
=== Albums ===
- Half (mini album, 2006)
- Escape from Division Street (2011, reissue on Nang, 2013)
- Hotspace (Nang 2017)

=== Singles ===
- "Chelsea" (Atlantis Audio, 2004)
- "She's the One" (Crosstown Rebels, 2004)
- "Friendz" (Atlantis Audio, 2005)
- "Zombie Party" (Crosstown Rebels, 2005)
- "Clubscene Popscene" (Eskimo, 2007)
- "NiteFlyte" (Society, 2009)
- "Crawlers" (split single with "Large Number" and "X-wife", White Label Music, 2005)
- "2AM" (with Philip Oakey) (Nang 2013)
- "DJ Culture" (with Roots Manuva) (Nang 2013)
- "Freaky Nights" (Nang Records 2016)
- "Moonwitch And Tarot" (Subfield) 2020
- "Im Just Watching" Featuring Dorian Cox (Doittessen) 2022
