= Pickled Eggs and Sherbet =

Studio album by All Seeing I
- Released: 1999
- Genres: Big beat; electronic; trip hop
- Producers: Dean Honer; Richard Barrett; Jason Buckle

Singles from Pickled Eggs and Sherbet
- 1. "I Walk" Released: 1997; 2. "The Beat Goes On" Released: 1998; 3. "Walk like a Panther" Released: 1999; 4. "1st Man in Space" Released: 1999

Pickled Eggs and Sherbet is the sole album by English electronic group All Seeing I. The album reached No. 45 on the UK Albums Chart.

== Background and release ==
The Pickled Eggs and Sherbet album was originally released in 1999 in the UK, Russia & Europe on vinyl, cassette & CD.

It was remastered in 2025 on vinyl and CD for the UK.

== Track listing ==
1. "Walk like a Panther" (featuring Tony Christie)
2. "No Return"
3. "Beat Goes On"
4. "Sweet Music"
5. "Mary"
6. "1st Man in Space" (featuring Philip Oakey)
7. "Drive Safely Darlin'"
8. "Stars on Sunday"
9. "Big Pecker"
10. "I Walk"
11. "I Pejulater"
12. "Nicola"
13. "Plastic Diamond"
14. "Dirty Girl"
15. "Airy Armpits"

== Personnel ==
=== All Seeing I ===
- Dean Honer - keyboards, programming, production
- Jason Buckle - guitars, bass, production
- Richard Barrett (DJ Parrot) - drums, programming, production

=== Vocalists ===
- Tony Christie ("Walk Like a Panther", "Nicola")
- Jarvis Cocker ("Drive Safely Darlin")
- Philip Oakey ("1st Man in Space")
- Stephen Jones ("Plastic Diamond")
