= Add Insult to Injury =

Studio album by Add N to (X)
- Released: 16 October 2000
- Genre: Electroclash
- Length: 63:21
- Label: Mute
- Producer: Add N to (X)

Add N to (X) chronology
Avant Hard (1999)	Add Insult to Injury (2000)	Loud Like Nature (2002)

Singles from Add Insult to Injury
- 1. "Plug Me In" Released: 2000; 2. "Poke 'er 'ole" Released: 2001

Professional ratings
Review scores
Source	Rating
AllMusic	4/5 stars
Pitchfork	5.9/10
Trouser Press	Mixed
Hot Press	Mixed

Add Insult to Injury is the fourth studio album by British electronic musicians Add N to (X). It was released on 16 October 2000 by Mute Records. The album is essentially two mini-albums fused together, as half was written and performed by Ann Shenton and Steve Claydon, while the other half was written and performed by Barry 7, with occasional help from Dean Honer from The All Seeing I.

Early prints of the album came with 'scratch and sniff' panels (it smelt of grass), and stickers.

== Track listing ==
1. "Adding N to X" (Claydon/Shenton) – 2:39
2. "Brothel Charge" (Allum/Claydon/Shenton) – 3:02
3. "You Must Create" (Allum/Claydon/Shenton) – 4:05
4. "Kingdom of Shades" (Allum/Claydon/Shenton) – 3:47
5. "Monster Bobby" (Barry/Honer/Smith) – 4:03
6. "Poke 'er 'ole" (Allum/Claydon/Shenton) – 4:25
7. "Plug Me In" (Barry/Honer/Smith) – 5:31
8. "Hit for Cheese" (Allum/Claydon/Shenton) – 3:05
9. "MDMH (Miami Dust Mite Harvest)" (Allum/Claydon/Shenton) – 4:24
10. "B.P. Perino" (Allum/Claydon/Honer/Shenton) – 6:51
11. "Incinerator No. 1" (Barry/Smith) – 5:33
12. "The Regent Is Dead" (Barry/Honer/Smith) – 15:56
13. "Violent Breath" (hidden track)

Adding N to X
Steve Claydon – Synthesizer, Bass, Cello, Keyboards, Vocals, Mellotron, Vocoder, Omnichord, Pedals
Ann Shenton – Synthesizer, Flute, Cello, Keyboards, Theremin, Vocals, Mellotron, Harmonica

Brothel Charge/You Must Create/Kingdom of Shades/Poke/Hit for Cheese/MDMH
Rob Allum – Synthesizer, Bass, Percussion, Drums, Pedals
Steve Claydon – Synthesizer, Bass, Cello, Keyboards, Vocals, Mellotron, Vocoder, Omnichord, Pedals
Ann Shenton – Synthesizer, Flute, Cello, Keyboards, Theremin, Vocals, Mellotron, Harmonica

Monster Bobby/Plug Me In/The Regent Is Dead
Barry Seven – Synthesizer, Celeste, Keyboards, Organ, Clavinet, Mellotron
Dean Honer – arranger

B.P. Perino
Rob Allum – Synthesizer, Bass, Percussion, Drums, Pedals
Steve Claydon – Synthesizer, Bass, Cello, Keyboards, Vocals, Mellotron, Vocoder, Omnichord, Pedals
Dean Honer – arranger
Ann Shenton – Synthesizer, Flute, Cello, Keyboards, Theremin, Vocals, Mellotron, Harmonica

Incinerator No. 1
Barry Seven – Synthesizer, Celeste, Keyboards, Organ, Clavinet, Mellotron

Violent Breath
Dean Honer – arranger
Rob Allum – Synthesizer, Bass, Percussion, Drums, Pedal
Barry Seven – Synthesizer, Celeste, Keyboards, Organ, Clavinet, Mellotron
Ann Shenton – Synthesizer, Flute, Cello, Keyboards, Theremin, Vocals, Mellotron, Harmonica
Steve Claydon – Synthesizer, Bass, Cello, Keyboards, Vocals, Mellotron, Vocoder, Omnichord, Pedals

== Personnel ==
- Dave Williamson – bass
- Joe Dilworth – drums, Photography
- Rob Allum – Synthesizer, Bass, Percussion, Drums, Bass Pedals, Machines
- David Titlow – Photography
- Add N to (X) – Artwork
- Ann Shenton – Synthesizer, Flute, Arranger, Cello, Keyboards, Theremin, Vocals, Choir, Chorus, Moog Synthesizer, Producer, Mellotron, Korg Synthesizer, Mixing, Accompaniment, Arp 2600, Harmonica (Electric)
- Barry Seven – Synthesizer, Arranger, Celeste, Keyboards, Organ (Hammond), Stick, Clavinet, Moog Synthesizer, Producer, Engineer, Mellotron, Korg Synthesizer, Guitar Synth, Roland Synthesizer, Chords
- Steve Claydon – Synthesizer, Bass, Arranger, Cello, Keyboards, Stick, Vocals, Moog Synthesizer, Producer, Mellotron, Korg Synthesizer, Vocoder, Omnichord, Bass Pedals, Mixing, Throat, Accompaniment, Micro Moog
- Richard Hermitage – Management
- Ben Rymer – vocals
- Dean Honer – arranger
- Ross Orton – drums
