= Fast and Cheap Mixes =

Remix album by HK119, HK119 vs. Bit-Phalanx
- Released: 4 January 2010
- Recorded: London
- Genres: electronica, IDM
- Labels: One Little Indian, Bit-Phalanx
- Producers: HK119, I Monster, Simon Duffy

HK119, HK119 vs. Bit-Phalanx chronology
Fast, Cheap And Out Of Control	Fast and Cheap Mixes

Professional ratings
Review scores
Source	Rating
Wears The Trousers	7/10 stars
Zap Bang! Magazine	3.5/5 stars

Fast And Cheap Mixes is the 2010 remix album project by HK119. The album is a collection of remixes of tracks from her 2008 album Fast, Cheap And Out Of Control, after all the tracks were made available in their individual parts via HK119's official website as part of a competition for anyone to submit their own remixes of the tracks to be considered for a later release.

London-based Electronica netlabel Bit-Phalanx commissioned its entire roster of artists to remix one of the tracks each and compiled their own remix album of the Fast, Cheap And Out Of Control tracks. The original intention was for Bit-Phalanx to release the album through their own netlabel, but the album quickly caught the attention of One Little Indian Records, who offered to give the album an official digital release in 2010.

The 11 remixes that feature on the album all cover very different areas of the Electronica genre. Including dubstep, acid, IDM, Electro, Drum and bass, abstract, ambient and Electro-acoustic.

On 4 December 2009, online music magazine Wears The Trousers gave away a free 6-minute megamix mp3 featuring selections from each remix on the album, as part of the magazine's weekly 'Free Music Friday.

On 7 December 2009, Bit-Phalanx released a free bonus 7-track EP of additional remixes of the track "C'est La Vie". The original track was issued as Fast, Cheap And Out Of Control's lead single, and was specifically omitted from Fast And Cheap Mixes to make more of a feature out of the EP, which included mixes from other guest artists as well as other remixes from acts featured on the album.

In January 2010, Fast And Cheap Mixes received an exclusive first digital release through the Bleep.com digital store. The album went on general release through all usual digital retail stores on 26 April 2010, in conjunction with Bit-Phalanx's final free EP of bonus remixes for the track "Space Pt.1".

== Track listing ==
1. "Mind (Martin Phone's Bad Tempered Klavier Rexim)" − 5:14
2. "Clone (Cloned by Niggle)" − 3:16
3. "Super Bug (Same Actor Remix)" − 4:06
4. "Tropikalia (T-toe's Claps And Bones Remix)" − 5:25
5. "Space Pt.1 (IJO's Bardak Remix)" – 4:53
6. "What Am I (Portmanteau Remix)" − 5:55
7. "Night (Mr O's RSI Remix)" − 2:50
8. "Space Pt.2 (Tulin-Fée's Tulin Seule Remix)" − 4:16
9. "Liberty (Odan's Isaiah Berlin Remix)" − 2:30
10. "Celeb (Hector Osbert's Smashing A Rock in Haris Pilton's Face Remix)" − 5:24
11. "Divine (Jilk's Elea Remix)" – 4:10

(Track 10 features backing vocals from cult British folk singer, Mara Carlyle.)

== Singles/EPs ==
In addition to the One Little Indian Records release of the Fast And Cheap Mixes album, Bit-Phalanx released two bonus remix EPs of new and exclusive remixes in addition to the album, as free downloads from their own website, and under the Bit-Phalanx label.

As well as new mixes from remixes already featured on the album, the C'est La Vie and Space Pt. 1 EPs featured especially invited artists, not on the Bit-Phalanx label.

- HK119 vs. Bit-Phalanx – "C'est La Vie" (Bit-Phalanx Music – BITPEP001DL) (Independently released free download EP, December 2009.)
1. "C'est La Vie (Jash's Mushroom Brew Remix)"
2. "C'est La Vie (Mr O's Tyrant Load Remix)"
3. "C'est La Vie (Douce Angoisse's Barbu Girl Remix)"
4. "C'est La Vie (Topher's Life And Everything Therein Remix)"
5. "C'est La Vie (Martin Phone's Ten Hertz Snare Remix)"
6. "C'est La Vie (T-toe's Dub)"
7. "C'est La Vie (K21's Masters of the World Remix)"
- HK119 vs. Bit-Phalanx – "Space Pt.1" (Bit-Phalanx Music – BITPEP004DL) (Independently released free download EP, April 2010.)
1. "Space Pt.1 (Timothy A.D. Remix)"
2. "Space Pt.1 (Martin Phone's European Antilobster Rexim)"
3. "Space Pt.1 (Jilk's Homeless Remix)"
4. "Space Pt.1 (Jash's Lysergic Summer Dream Remix)"
5. "Space Pt.1 (T-toe's 33 Lightyear Trip Remix)"
6. "Space Pt.1 (Niggle's Moonsteppa Remix)"
7. "Space Pt.1 (Microphyst's Tesco Shampoo Remix)"
