= Avant Hard =

Studio album by Add N to (X)
- Released: 20 April 1999
- Studio: Unit 20; The Instrument; Eastcote
- Genre: Electronica
- Length: 56:25
- Label: Mute
- Producer: Add N to (X); Barry 7; Dean Honer

Add N to (X) chronology
On the Wires of Our Nerves (1998)	Avant Hard (1999)	Add Insult to Injury (2000)

Singles from Avant Hard
- 1. "Metal Fingers in My Body" Released: 1999; 2. "Revenge of the Black Regent" Released: 1999

Professional ratings
Review scores
Source	Rating
AllMusic	4.5/5 stars
The Independent	4/5 stars
Melody Maker	3.5/5 stars
NME	9/10
Pitchfork	7.3/10
Q	3/5 stars
Select	4/5

Avant Hard is the third studio album by English electronic music band Add N to (X). It was released in 1999 on Mute Records.

The track "Metal Fingers in My Body" was used in an advertisement for a digital television service in the UK, played as the background music for skateboarder Danny Way for a montage of tricks. "Barry 7's Contraption" was used as the background music for a telecoms advert for Orange UK directed by Chris Cunningham, and was used regularly as backing music on the TV series Banzai.

== Track listing ==
All tracks are written by Add N to (X) (Steven Claydon, Ann Shenton and Barry Smith).

No.	Title	Length
1.	"Barry 7's Contraption"	4:09
2.	"Robot New York"	4:11
3.	"Skills"	3:51
4.	"Steve's Going to Teach Himself Who's Boss"	3:05
5.	"Fyuz"	4:32
6.	"Buckminster Fuller"	3:36
7.	"Revenge of the Black Regent"	6:12
8.	"Metal Fingers in My Body"	5:13
9.	"Ann's Eveready Equestrian"	4:07
10.	"Oh Yeah, Oh No"	7:00
11.	"Machine Is Bored with Love" (song ends at 3:54; includes hidden track "Are Streets Antiques" (5:55) after 0:33 of silence)	10:22

Sample credits

- "Machine Is Bored with Love" is based on samples from "Fugue in D Minor", written and performed by Egg (Dave Stewart, Dirk Campbell and Clive Brooks).

== Personnel ==
Production

- Add N to (X) – production, arrangement
- Barry 7 – production, arrangement
- Dean Honer – production, arrangement
- Ebby Acquah – engineering
- Steve D'Agostino – engineering
- Roger Johnson – engineering

Additional musicians

- Rob Allum
- Alison Goldfrapp

Artwork and design

- Add N to (X) – artwork
- Joe Dilworth – band photos

== Charts ==
Chart (1999)	Peak position
UK Albums (OCC)	100
UK Independent Albums (OCC)	18
