= Venini =

British band

- Origin: Sheffield, England
- Genres: Indie rock, art rock
- Years active: 1998–2001
- Label: Bikini Records
- Members: Debbie Lime; Russell Senior; Nick Eastwood; Rob Barton; Danny Hunt; Charlie Collins; Michael Ash; Nic Burke

Venini were a British artrock band, featuring members of Pulp and Ladytron, who were active between the years 1998 and 2001.

== History ==
Guitarist and violinist Russell Senior left Pulp in 1997 and began writing and demoing songs with vocalist/lyricist Debbie Lime (real name Debbie Russell-Williams) in the Spring of 1998. Through what Senior described as "bizarre coincidences", they were able to recruit Daniel Hunt on keyboards, Nick Eastwood on bass, and Rob Barton on drums over the following months. Charlie Collins of Clock DVA was also a part-time member on woodwind. The group took their name from a Venetian glass manufacturer. Their first public performance was supporting Rialto at a Warwick University Freshers’ Ball and they went on to play a number of other gigs around the UK, including Glastonbury and Reading & Leeds festivals.

Gaining a fair amount of attention in the media, the band's awkward, experimental brand of artpop was lauded by some, but received a mediocre or outright hostile reception in the music press. The group's image also drew a great deal of attention, with Lime fully dressed in leather on stage. They released just three singles during their lifetime - Mon Camion, (1999) Carnival Star (1999) (both on the band's own Bikini Records) – each of which entered the indie top 30 – and the Unshaker EP (2000), that was only available via mail order from the band's website. An album was recorded in 1999, but never released.

Hunt's involvement in the group ceased when his other band Ladytron began to release records, and he was replaced by Michael Ash. Senior himself left towards the end of the band's life, planning to take a more managerial role, and was replaced with guitarist Nic Burke, but this new line up never came to fruition and the band announced their split in 2001.

== After split ==
Lime and Ash formed a short-lived new band called Tokyo Lucky Hole after Venini's demise. Ash works as a sound engineer in Sheffield, and continues to be involved in experimental music. Lime is a sound healer and therapist living on the Welsh border. Nick Eastwood formed Hiem with former All Seeing I singer Bozz, and they have since released a number of well-received singles. Barton and Burke both play in The Human League's live band. Hunt continues to record with Ladytron, in addition to working as a DJ and a club owner.

Russell Senior announced before Venini's split that he was quitting music to open an antique shop, but in recent years, he has played guest violin with The Long Blondes and joined Pulp for several of their reunion shows in 2011.

== Discography ==
- Mon Camion / St. Tropez (21 June 1999), Bikini Records
- Carnival Star / Carnival Star (Version II) (1 November 1999), Bikini Records
- Postcard (free mp3 download, official website) (July 2000)
- Unshaker / Exotic Night / Hoboken (29 September 2000), Bikini Records
