= This Is for Real =

This Is for Real may refer to:

- "This Is for Real" (song), a song by Motion City Soundtrack
- This Is for Real (album), a 2004 album by Pink Grease
- This Is for Real, a 1965 novel by James Hadley Chase
