= Be My Lover Now =

Single by Giorgio Moroder and Philip Oakey

from the album Philip Oakey & Giorgio Moroder
- Released: 12 August 1985
- Recorded: 1985
- Length: 3:42
- Label: Virgin
- Songwriter(s): Moroder and Oakey
- Producer(s): Giorgio Moroder

Philip Oakey singles chronology
"Good-Bye Bad Times" (1985)	"Be My Lover Now" (1985)	"What Comes After Goodbye" (1990)

Giorgio Moroder singles chronology
"Good-Bye Bad Times" (1985)	"Be My Lover Now" (1985)	"To Be Number One" (1990)

Audio sample
- file; help

"Be My Lover Now" is a song by British singer and songwriter Philip Oakey and producer Giorgio Moroder. It was written by Oakey and Moroder and recorded for the album Philip Oakey & Giorgio Moroder. It was released as a single in the UK in August 1985 where it reached number 91 on the singles charts and remained on the charts for 1 week. It was the third and final single to be released from the brief Oakey/Moroder partnership which had started with the hit single "Together in Electric Dreams" (1984).

== Music video ==
Philip Oakey in music video for "Be My Lover Now"

The music video for "Be My Lover Now" was less extravagant than the high budget video for the previous single "Good-Bye Bad Times".

The video has a surreal theme and features Philip Oakey performing on stage in an ornate theatre, with three female backing singers/dancers and two female podium dancers either side of the stage who are dressed identically to an audience of identical blue dress wearing female 'clones' in their 30s/40s who are competing for Oakey's attention.

== Critical reception ==
Upon its release as a single, Don Watson of NME considered "Be My Lover Now" to be "catchy enough" and "definitely an improvement" on "Together in Electric Dreams". He also noted the "infuriatingly familiar, cloying perfect slide guitar refrain", but felt overall that the song did not "contain a spark of the irresistible tacky thrill that was 'Love Action'". Nancy Culp of Record Mirror remarked, "Phil, darling, you are wasting your awesome vocal talents endorsing this aural popcorn. Please go away at once and sing 15 choruses of 'Louise' to make up for it." Ro Newton of Number One noted the talents of Oakey and Moroder but felt "together they just don't seem to gel". She described the song as a "flat, repetitive disco dirge which establishes nothing except the fact Phillip is becoming rather desperate". John Harrison, writing for The Sydney Morning Herald, called it "strictly dance-floor material, with the inherent weakness (banal lyrics) and strengths (big beat) of that tag", but added that "it is a little classier than most of the ilk".
