= Philip Oakey & Giorgio Moroder =

Studio album by Philip Oakey & Giorgio Moroder
- Released: 29 July 1985
- Studios: Musicland Studios (Munich, West Germany); Powerplay Studios (Zurich, Switzerland)
- Genre: Synth-pop
- Length: 32:44
- Label: Virgin
- Producer: Giorgio Moroder

Giorgio Moroder chronology
Innovisions (1985)	Philip Oakey & Giorgio Moroder (1985)	Forever Dancing (1992)

Singles from Philip Oakey & Giorgio Moroder
- 1. "Together in Electric Dreams" Released: 1984; 2. "Good-Bye Bad Times" Released: 1985; 3. "Be My Lover Now" Released: 1985

Professional ratings
Review scores
Source	Rating
AllMusic	3/5 stars
Record Mirror	1/5 stars
Sounds	1/5 stars

Philip Oakey & Giorgio Moroder is a 1985 collaborative studio album by the English singer Philip Oakey, lead vocalist of the Human League, and Italian composer and record producer Giorgio Moroder. It peaked at number 52 on the UK Albums Chart.

The album includes "Together in Electric Dreams", which was written for the science fiction romantic comedy film Electric Dreams (1984). The track peaked at number 3 on the UK singles chart. "Good-Bye Bad Times" peaked at number 44 and "Be My Lover Now" peaked at number 91 on the UK singles chart.

== Production ==
In 2003, during an interview by the British music journalist and author Simon Price included on the DVD The Very Best of The Human League, Oakey was asked to comment on the experience of working with his idol Moroder on this project. He diplomatically characterises him as a "very quick worker", claiming they made the entire album within a few days.

== Track listing ==
All tracks are written by Philip Oakey and Giorgio Moroder, except "In Transit" written by Moroder.

No.	Title	Length
1.	"Why Must the Show Go On"	4:10
2.	"In Transit"	0:56
3.	"Good-Bye Bad Times"	3:51
4.	"Brand New Love (Take a Chance)"	3:59
5.	"Valerie"	3:24
6.	"Now"	4:26
7.	"Together in Electric Dreams"	3:52
8.	"Be My Lover Now"	3:51
9.	"Shake It Up"	4:16
Total length:		32:44

2003 reissue and digital download
No.	Title	Length
10.	"Together in Electric Dreams" (Extended)	6:26
11.	"Together in Electric Dreams" (Instrumental)	5:10
12.	"In Transit" (Extended)	0:50
13.	"Good-Bye Bad Times" (12" Remix)	5:40
14.	"Good-Bye Bad Times" (Instrumental)	5:20
15.	"Be My Lover Now" (12" Remix)	6:14
16.	"Be My Lover Now" (Instrumental)	4:58

== Personnel ==
Credits adapted from liner notes.

- Philip Oakey – vocals
- Giorgio Moroder – production, synthesizers
- Arthur Barrow – synthesizer, drum machine programming, bass guitar
- Richie Zito – guitar
- Joe Esposito – backing vocals
- Elizabeth Daily – backing vocals

== Charts ==
Chart (1985)	Peak position
Australia (Kent Music Report)	52
UK Albums (Official Charts)	52
