= On the Wires of Our Nerves =

1998 studio album by Add N to (X)

Studio album by Add N to (X)
- Released: 19 May 1998
- Genre: Electronica; noise rock
- Label: Satellite Records; Mute; Soul Jazz Records
- Producer: Add N to (X); Dean Honer

Add N to (X) chronology
Vero Electronics (1996)	On the Wires of Our Nerves (1998)	Avant Hard (1999)

Professional ratings
Review scores
Source	Rating
AllMusic	4/5 stars
The Guardian	4/5 stars
Muzik	7/10
NME	8/10
Pitchfork	9.0/10
Rolling Stone	3.5/5 stars
Spin	9/10

On the Wires of Our Nerves is the second studio album by English electronic music band Add N to (X), released in 1998 by Soul Jazz Records subsidiary label Satellite Records in the UK and Mute Records in North America. Soul Jazz reissued it as a limited edition silver vinyl double LP in 2021.

== Track listing ==
All tracks are written by Steven Claydon, Ann Shenton and Barry Smith, except where noted.

No.	Title	Writer(s)	Length
1.	"We Are Add N to X"		2:14
2.	"Murmur One"		7:06
3.	"Sound of Accelerating Concrete"		4:01
4.	"Gentle Germans"		2:30
5.	"The Black Regent"	Claydon; Shenton; Smith; Rob Allum	6:57
6.	"Planet Munich"		2:04
7.	"Nevermind"		6:27
8.	"King Wasp"	Claydon; Shenton; Smith; James Moore	3:35
9.	"Orgy of Bubastus"	Claydon; Shenton; Smith; Allum	5:15
10.	"Grey Body, Green Gun"		5:02
11.	"On the Wires of Our Nerves"		5:28
12.	"Hit Me"		6:00
13.	"Sir Ape"	Claydon; Shenton; Smith; Allum	4:45

"Nevermind" is a bonus track on the Satellite CD and the Soul Jazz reissue double LP.
Sample credits

- "King Wasp" contains elements from "I'm a King Bee", performed by Slim Harpo.

== Personnel ==
Add N to (X)

- Steven Claydon
- Ann Shenton
- Barry Smith

Additional musicians

- Rob Allum
- Dean Honer – additional keyboards

Production

- Add N to (X) – production, engineering
- Dean Honer – production, engineering

Artwork and design

- Simon Perriton – photography
- Adrian Self – design
- Sparky Hydrofoil – design
