= Walk like a Panther =

1999 single by All Seeing I

Single by All Seeing I and Tony Christie

from the album Pickled Eggs and Sherbet
- Released: 11 January 1999
- Length: 4:18
- Label: FFRR
- Songwriter(s): Jarvis Cocker, Dean Honer, Richard Barratt, Jason Buckle
- Producer(s): All Seeing I

All Seeing I singles chronology
| "Beat Goes On" (1998) | "Walk like a Panther" (1999) | "1st Man in Space" (1999) |

Tony Christie singles chronology
| "Solitaire" (1993) | "Walk like a Panther" (1999) | "(Is This the Way to) Amarillo" (2005) |

"Walk like a Panther" is a song by the All Seeing I with vocals from Tony Christie. It charted at number 10 on the UK Singles Chart.

== Background ==
"Walk like a Panther" was performed by All Seeing I with main vocals from Tony Christie and background vocals from Steve Edwards, and was written by Richard Barratt, Jason Buckle, Jarvis Cocker and Dean Honer, and was their third single from their album Pickled Eggs and Sherbet. It was written specifically for Christie to such an extent that it even mentions one of his past hits – "I Did What I Did for Maria" – and describes the hometown of the band members of the All Seeing I, Cocker and Christie: Sheffield. Cocker personally contacted Christie, who was living in Spain at the time as this was where he was most successful, asking if he would feature on the record. Christie had previously recorded a song of the same title for his debut album written by Mitch Murray & Peter Callander.

== Music video ==
A music video was produced for the song. it was shot in Castle Market, Sheffield, it features Christie singing his parts and culminates in others walking with their arms held high in time with the music, mimicking panthers.

== Chart performance ==
"Walk like a Panther" peaked in January 1999 at number 10 on the UK Singles Chart, becoming Christie's first hit in that country for twenty five years. It would be the band's only top ten single; "The Beat Goes On" and "1st Man in Space" would peak at numbers 11 and 28 respectively.

== Critical reception ==
NME said of the song "People just don't write songs like this any more!", said the song had "the vocal gravitas of a man, a common man, defiant in his invective against his lot, his shitty neighbourhood" and ended by describing it as "brave, impassioned and chuffin' catchy."

== Usage in popular culture ==
The band performed the song on Top of the Pops, once with Christie on vocals and the other with Cocker, and the song was featured on the album Top of the Pops 1999, Vol. 1. It was also featured on the compilation albums The Chillout Album, Vol. 2, Soundsystem Four and Now 42. Three years later, the Pretenders covered the song on their album Loose Screw.

The song was used in the third episode of BBC medical drama Bodies created by Jed Mercurio.

The title of the song was the inspiration for the 2018 British comedy Walk Like a Panther. Rick Astley covered the song as part of the film's soundtrack.
