= Vero Electronics =

Studio album by Add N to (X)
- Released: 1996
- Genre: Electronic
- Label: Blow Up Records

Add N to (X) chronology
Vero Electronics (1996)	On the Wires of Our Nerves (1999)

Professional ratings
Review scores
Source	Rating
AllMusic	3/5 stars

Vero Electronics is the debut album by British band Add N to (X), released in 1996 on Blow Up Records. Add N to (X) were later signed by Daniel Miller to Mute Records.

== Track listing ==
No.	Title	Length
1.	"Inevitable Fast Access"	6:16
2.	"A Silhouette of a Man and a Wasp"	7:04
3.	"Meeting In Compact Boxes"	5:45
4.	"A Very Uncomfortable Status (Wet Disco)"	7:34
5.	"Inevitable Fast Access (Sleeze)"	5:46
6.	"A Very Uncomfortable Status (Mathematical)"	8:00
7.	"Aphine Repetition"	8:47

== Personnel ==
- All songs by Add N To (X)
- Recorded at Neptune Studios, Sheffield
- Produced by Parrot
- Engineered by Dean
- Drumming by Ed on track 2
