= Loud Like Nature =

Studio album by Add N to (X)
- Released: October 21, 2002
- Length: 51:14
- Label: Mute
- Producer: Add N to (X)

Add N to (X) chronology
Add Insult to Injury (2000)	Loud Like Nature (2002)

Professional ratings
Aggregate scores
Source	Rating
Metacritic	76/100
Review scores
Source	Rating
AllMusic	4.5/5 stars
Pitchfork	6.8/10
The Guardian	3/5 stars
Trouser Press	Positive

Loud Like Nature is the fifth and final album by UK electronica group Add N to (X), released in 2002 through Mute Records.

== Track listing ==
1. "Total All Out Water" – 3:51
2. "Electric Village" – 3:36
3. "Sheez Mine" – 3:48
4. "Invasion of the Polaroid People" – 4:40
5. "Party Bag" – 4:56
6. "Quantum Leap" – 4:45
7. "Pink Light" – 5:42
8. "Up the Punks" – 3:48
9. "Take Me to Your Leader" – 3:35
10. "Lick a Battery (Tongues Across the Terminals)" – 3:07
11. ".-U Baby" – 1:41
12. "Large Number" – 3:18
13. "All Night Lazy" – 4:17
