= In Perpetuity =

- Severance episode
- Helly gets shown the Perpetuity Wing
- Episode no.: Season 1 Episode 3
- Directed by: Ben Stiller
- Written by: Andrew Colville
- Cinematography by: Jessica Lee Gagné
- Editing by: Erica Freed Marker; Geoffrey Richman
- Original release date: February 25, 2022
- Running time: 56 minutes

Guest appearances
- Yul Vazquez as Peter "Petey" Kilmer; Sydney Cole Alexander as Natalie; Michael Cumpsty as Doug Graner; Michael Siberry as Jame Eagan; Marc Geller as Kier Eagan (voice)

Episode chronology
← Previous "Half Loop"	Next → "The You You Are"

"In Perpetuity" is the third episode of the first season of the American science fiction psychological thriller television series Severance. The episode was written by executive producer Andrew Colville, and directed by executive producer Ben Stiller. It was released on Apple TV+ on February 25, 2022.

The series follows employees of Lumon Industries, a biotechnology corporation that uses a medical procedure called "severance" to separate the memories of their employees: at work, Lumon employees, called "innies", can't remember anything outside of work. Outside work, Lumon employees, called "outies", can't remember anything about work. As a result, innies and outies experience two different lives, with distinct personalities and agendas. In the episode, Helly tries to get her "outie" to accept her resignation request, while Petey struggles to differentiate the present from the past.

The episode received highly positive reviews from critics, who praised the performances, production design and intrigue.

== Plot ==
Mark (Adam Scott) checks on Petey (Yul Vazquez), whose memories have been affected as he struggles to differentiate the present from the past. He explains that benefactors who oppose the severance procedure helped him bypass the implant and merge his memories, a process known as "reintegration." He wants Mark to do the same, but Mark refuses, as he feels the severance procedure has helped him after his wife's death.

Helly (Britt Lower) submits a resignation request to her outie but is shocked when she finds that it has been denied. Desperate, she locks herself in a restroom to write a message on her body, but Mark warns that it will not work. Irving (John Turturro) suggests that they show her the Perpetuity Wing in hopes of giving her a sense of purpose at Lumon. Meanwhile, Devon (Jen Tullock) and Ricken (Michael Chernus) arrive at Mark's house, leaving a copy of Ricken's new self-help book on his porch. After they leave, Mrs. Selvig (Patricia Arquette) retrieves the book and sneaks into Mark's house. Petey hides and, recognizing Cobel, flees the house. She later returns to Lumon, having Milchick (Tramell Tillman) check the book for hidden messages.

Mark, Irving and Dylan (Zach Cherry) take Helly to the Perpetuity Wing, a museum-like area of the office detailing Lumon's history. The first exhibit contains wax figures of Lumon's founder Kier Eagan and his succeeding dynasty, with his descendant Jame as the current CEO. Irving, an ardent devotee of the Eagans' philosophy, explains various parts of the company's history to Helly, emphasizing that Lumon is making a positive difference in people's lives. The four continue into a life-sized replica of Kier's home; Helly sneaks out while the others are distracted. She breaks a window in a door with a fire extinguisher to attempt to sneak a note to her outie, alerting security. Graner (Michael Cumpsty) takes her to Milchick, who forces her to enter the break room. There, she must read a statement wherein she apologizes for her actions, with Milchick forcing her to repeat the statement until he deems her response sincere.

When the shift is over, Mark goes through old photos of the MDR team, which include Petey. As he replaces the photos in the frames with new ones, he finds a hand-drawn map of Lumon's hallways hidden inside one. (Note: Petey mentions he left a copy of the map for Mark in "Half Loop".) At a convenience store, Petey experiences a severe breakdown and collapses. After finding that Petey has left, Mark follows an ambulance to the convenience store and witnesses Petey drop to the ground before being carried away by paramedics. Shaken, Mark returns home and cleans the basement to hide Petey's presence. Suddenly, he finds Petey's cellphone ringing.

== Development ==
=== Production ===
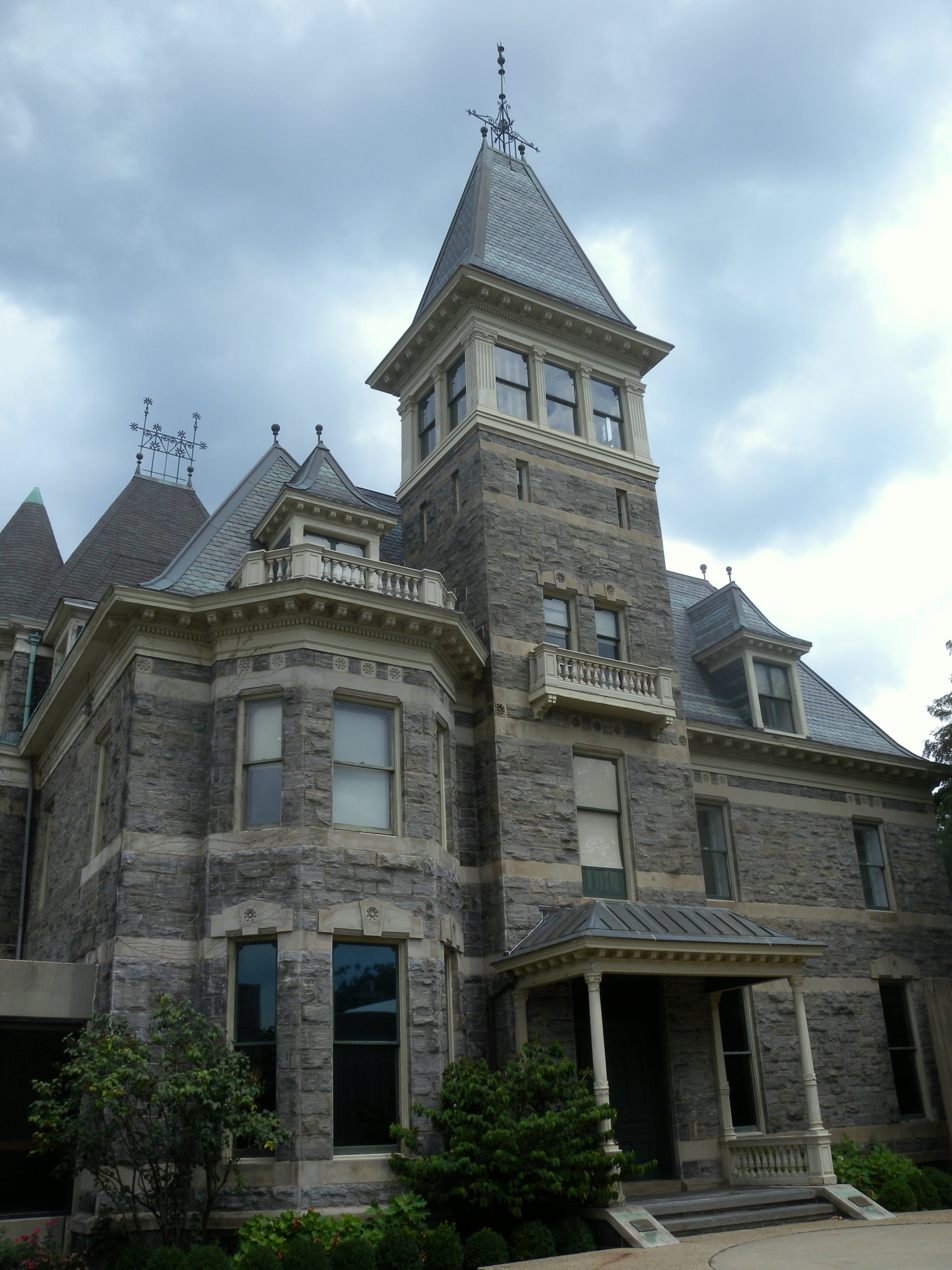
Glenview Mansion of the Hudson River Museum served as the replica of Kier Eagan's house in the Perpetuity Wing.

The episode was written by executive producer Andrew Colville, and directed by executive producer Ben Stiller. This marked Colville's first writing credit, and Stiller's third directing credit.

The scenes of Petey's flashback reintegrations were inspired by the memory scenes from Eternal Sunshine of the Spotless Mind. Director Ben Stiller sought to "use as few visual effects as possible." This was done by whipping the camera between the two versions of the scene.

The Perpetuity Wing scenes were filmed at the Hudson River Museum. Series creator Dan Erickson described the Innies' perception of the wax figures of the Eagans in the Perpetuity Wing as "to them it's like a church, because these are the people who created everything that they know, so they are deified in a way." Stiller was intrigued by the idea of a corporate museum. Disneyland's The Hall of Presidents served as his inspiration for the wax figures of the Eagans. His inspiration for the replica of Kier Eagan's house was the Temple of Dendur at the Metropolitan Museum of Art, an Egyptian temple that is rebuilt in an indoor museum.

The smile wall in the Perpetuity Wing contains photos of the faces of crew members who worked on Severance. Due to filming during the COVID pandemic, the photos were the first time many had seen each other's faces without a mask on.

== Critical reviews ==
"In Perpetuity" received highly positive reviews from critics. Matt Schimkowitz of The A.V. Club gave the episode a "B+" and wrote, "Consuming Severance's third episode is an intense albeit interesting history lesson. To give its suspense a solid foundation, 'In Perpetuity' relies heavily on exposition. This isn't a complaint by any means because a TV show as dense as this one needs it. Plus, Severance has already developed a potent visual language that communicates subtext along with the explanation. What I mean is that to cram it in this single hour can be a lot to handle so early on. At least everything we learn about Lumon Industries' cryptic origins sheds a little light on how this company came to be, the family that runs it, and what the ultimate goal might be."

Erin Qualey of Vulture gave the episode a perfect 5 star rating out of 5 and wrote, "It seems to be a combination of guilt-ridden prayer, the classic and agonizingly repetitive 'write it 100 times' chalkboard punishment, and downright torture. Milchick's steely presence and curt responses fill the scene with a sense of impending dread and an understanding that any refusal to do exactly as he says will be met with severe consequences."

Oliver VanDervoort of Game Rant wrote, "Directed by Ben Stiller, the overall tone of the third episode stayed very in tune with the first two episodes. However, when it came to the 'edge of the seat' approach that was prevalent through the end of the first episode and the entirety of the second, 'In Perpetuity' didn't quite hit the mark." Breeze Riley of Telltale TV gave the episode a 4 star rating out of 5 and wrote, "There is no lack of suspense on this show, and I can't wait to hear who is on the other end of the line."

Mary Littlejohn of TV Fanatic gave the episode a 4 star rating out of 5 and wrote, "This show continues to exude a sense of unease and low-grade terror. In that way, it does its job well." Caemeron Crain of TV Obsessive wrote, "I expect [Mark will] continue to investigate what's going on as best he can, which will mean continuing to go to work and the perpetuation of the split between the two versions of himself. Presumably he could quit, and it would just have to be the outie version of himself who did so, with work memories (and innie Mark) being forever lost to the void. But that wouldn't make a very good TV show. I wonder who is on the other end of that ringing phone Petey left behind."
