= HK119 =

- Born: Heidi Kilpeläinen
- Origin: Finland
- Genres: Electronica, lo-fi, pop
- Occupations: Visual Artist, Performer, Recording Artist, Designer
- Years active: 2003–present
- Label: One Little Indian Records
- Website: HK119.co.uk (now inactive)

HK119 is the alter ego of Finnish multimedia artist, singer and recording artist Heidi Kilpeläinen, who lives and works in London, England.

== Background ==
Having graduated from Central Saint Martins College of Art and Design in 2004 with an MA in Fine Art from combining her skills as a performance artist with stage design, video production and her budding music production, Kilpeläinen felt that the output of this mix of performance art and multimedia was best delivered through the fictitious character of HK119; a character born out of science fiction references and a fictitious barcode number.

The character of HK119 was a tongue-in-cheek critique at mass consumerism, and Kilpeläinen's theories regarding humanity's relationship with everything from socialism and capitalism, to technology and celebrity culture, all delivered in an underlying humorous tone.

Kilpeläinen's lo-fi, do-it-yourself approach to recording music (initially alone, on a digital 8-track (multitrack) recorder) and recording her own music videos dressed in everyday materials (such as tin foil and paper) for each track, provided Kilpeläinen with enough material to form the basis of her live stage shows, for which her videos would frequently provide a backdrop, while she sang over a backing track of her songs. HK119's live performances quickly gained her comparisons to artists such as David Bowie, Grace Jones and Nina Hagen due to Kilpeläinen's signature style of black catsuits, robotic dancing, giant cardboard headpieces and inflated black refuse bags.

== Music career ==
In 2004, her videos and performances around the London club scene caught the attention of Leila Arab, an Electronic musician signed to the influential Warp Records label. Leila passed Kilpeläinen's work on to Icelandic musician Björk, who announced HK119 as her favourite act of 2004 in Q Magazine, calling HK119 "The Perfect Blonde Woman".

HK119 was signed to Björk's parent label, One Little Indian Records, which released HK119's first single "Pick Me Up" in November 2005, followed by her eponymous debut album in February 2006. The HK119 album was a collection of the songs Kilpeläinen had produced as part of her degree, and was notable for its considerably lo-fi, electro sound.

In 2008, HK119 returned with her second album, Fast, Cheap and Out of Control. HK119's style—visually and musically—changed considerably as a result of Kilpeläinen's first collaboration with other producers. Sheffield based electronic dance producers I Monster were the main production force behind 'Fast, Cheap And Out of Control', bringing a glossier, smoother, and more-melodic style to Kilpeläinen's lyrics. She adopted a sports-themed attire for her visuals and live performances.

Around the time of Fast, Cheap and Out of Control release, HK119 and One Little Indian Records made each track on the album available in individual parts online as part of a remix challenge. Anyone's remixed single submitted to the label would be considered for a remixed version of the album. Bit-Phalanx, a London netlabel and music-manager specialising in electronic music, commissioned its entire roster of artists to remix one of HK119's tracks each and compiled an entire remix album, Fast And Cheap Mixes, which One Little Indian Records released as a digital download in early 2010.

Bit-Phalanx released also two free bonus EPs of remixes of "C'est La Vie" and "Space Pt.1" exclusively on the label's website. The former track was the lead single from Fast, Cheap and Out of Control.

From early 2012, HK119 was preparing for her third solo album and performing infrequent live shows. A song titled "Adailson" was available for free download from One Little Indian's SoundCloud on 6 November 2012. She released her third studio album Imaginature on 23 March 2013. The song "Snowblind" was picked as the first single. The album was produced by Christoffer Berg.

== Films ==
On 7 May 2016, Kilpeläinen's latest video, titled ":D", premiered at Camden Arts Centre in London. The video gives its own take on the modern era of digital culture and was said that "it mocks the promises of digital technology" by German filmmaker Hito Steyerl.

== Discography ==
=== Albums ===
- HK119 (One Little Indian Records) (2006)
- Fast, Cheap and Out of Control. (One Little Indian Records) (2008)
- Fast And Cheap Mixes (One Little Indian Records) (2010) (Credited to 'HK119 vs. Bit-Phalanx')
- Imaginature (One Little Indian Records) (2013)

=== Singles and EPs ===
- 2005 "Pick Me Up" (One Little Indian Records) (12", 7", CD, DVD)
- 2006 "Buy Me" (One Little Indian Records) (Promo single only, Promo CD)
- 2008 "Mind" (One Little Indian Records) (Promo single only, Promo 5" vinyl)
- 2008 "C'est La Vie" (One Little Indian Records) (Promo CD, Remix 12")
- 2009 "Mind" (Prolifica) (Independently released club remixes, digital EP)
- 2009 "C'est La Vie" (Bit-Phalanx) (Credited to 'HK119 vs. Bit-Phalanx' – Bonus digital EP of Electronica remixes, in conjunction with 'Fast and Cheap Mixes' album)
- 2010 "Space Pt. 1" (Bit-Phalanx) (Credited to 'HK119 vs. Bit-Phalanx' – Bonus digital EP of Electronica remixes, in conjunction with 'Fast and Cheap Mixes' album)

== Filmography ==
- 1986 Ursula
