= What Comes After Goodbye =

Single by Respect and Philip Oakey
- Released: December 1990
- Genre: Synth-pop
- Length: 3:34
- Label: Chrysalis Records
- Songwriter(s): Walmsley/Robson/Hartley and Philip Oakey
- Producer(s): Chris Heaton & Mark Stent

Philip Oakey singles chronology
"Be My Lover Now" (1985)	"What Comes After Goodbye" (1990)	"1st Man in Space" (1999)

"What Comes After Goodbye" is a song by the three piece Sheffield group Respect, written by Walmsley/Robson/Hartley and Philip Oakey. It was created for and released by Chrysalis Records

The song featured Oakey's baritone guest vocals with Respects' female vocalist, Josephine Robson, providing backing. It was the second of two single releases by Respect, the first being "Love Drives On". Their album was The Kissing Game (1991). Without any further contribution by Oakey, Respect did not exist beyond 1991.

== Maxi CD track listing ==
1. "What Comes After Goodbye" (7" Version)
2. "What Comes After Goodbye" (Remix - Phil Harding & Ian Curnow)
3. "The Girl Needs Respect"
4. "Ghost Dance"
