= Fast, Cheap and Out of Control (album) =

Album by HK119

Studio album by HK119
- Released: 28 September 2008
- Recorded: London
- Genres: Electro, pop, lo-fi, electronica
- Label: One Little Independent
- Producers: HK119, I Monster, Simon Duffy

HK119 chronology
HK119	Fast, Cheap and Out of Control	Fast and Cheap Mixes

Fast, Cheap and Out of Control is the 2008 follow-up album to HK119's 2006 eponymous debut. The album was released through One Little Independent Records on 28 September 2008 in the United Kingdom.

Unlike the artist’s low-fi first studio album, this song contains a more refined sound of electropop music, achieved by working with guest musicians, songwriters, and producers, including Mara Carlyle, who lends her voice as the chorus singer for the song “Divine”. The lyrics of the album deal with topics such as human cloning, pop culture, global warming, and civil rights.

The imagery of the album's artwork and HK119 herself had also changed considerably for this album. In bringing the album "Back down to earth" and "from a more personal place", HK119 used the imagery of sportswear and use of such related equipment as a dumbbell to highlight the competitive nature of humanity (while also seen smoking on the cover sleeve, to represent the conflict of "what does it mean to be human?"; a line featured in the album's lead single, "C'est La Vie".)

As with her previous album, HK119 produced a short series of home-made music videos to coincide with the album. As the tracks on 'Fast, Cheap and Out of Control' were longer and more finely produced than before, there were only five coinciding videos with the album (unlike 11 videos that were made for the debut album.) These videos featured HK119's humorous experiments with chroma key (also known as green screen) video production.

HK119 and One Little Independent Records made the album's tracks available in individual parts on HK119s official website as part of a remix challenge, for people to make alternative versions of the tracks to potentially be later releases as their own remix album.

The resulting release, Fast And Cheap Mixes, is a collection of electronica themed remixes by a collective of artists on the Bit-Phalanx netlabel based in London. Fast And Cheap Mixes was released digitally through One Little Independent Records in April 2010. Additionally, Bit-Phalanx have released two free bonus EPs of additional remixes of "C'est La Vie" and "Space Pt.1" through their official website.

== Track listing ==
1. "Mind" – 2:51
2. "Celeb" – 3:39
3. "C'est La Vie" – 3:35
4. "Clone" – 3:55
5. "Rules & Regulations (interval)" – 0:28
6. "Liberty" – 3:15
7. "Space Pt.1" – 4:15
8. "Divine (featuring Mara Carlyle)" – 3:17
9. "Cryonics" – 3:52
10. "Super Bug" – 3:40
11. "Tropikalia" – 3:23
12. "Health & Safety (interval)" – 0:19
13. "What Am I" – 3:00
14. "Space Pt.2" – 4:26
15. "Avaruusasema" – 3:48
16. "Night" – 2:58

== Singles ==
- "Mind" (One Little Independent Records) (2008) (Promo single only, CD-sized 5" vinyl)
1. "Mind"
2. "Night"
- "C'est La Vie" (One Little Independent Records) (2007) (Download single, 12" remix vinyl)
1. "C'est La Vie"
2. "C'est La Vie (Rusko Masher)"
3. "C'est La Vie (Rusko Dub Mix)"
4. "C'est La Vie (David E. Sugar Tyrell Corp Mix)"
5. "C'est La Vie (David E. Suger Radio Edit Mix)"
6. "C'est La Vie (Armageddon Turk Remix)"
- "Mind" (Prolifica) (2009) (Independently released club remixes, Download EP)
1. "Mind (JeKo Trip Mix)"
2. "Mind (JeKo Dub Mix)"
3. "Mind (R.O.D + Stefano B Remix)"
4. "Mind (Some DJ Remix)"
5. "Mind (JeKo Trip Edit)"
