= Walk like a Panther (film) =

Walk Like a Panther
- Film poster
- Directed by: Dan Cadan
- Written by: Dan Cadan
- Produced by: John Coyne, Dean O'Toole
- Starring: Stephen Graham; Christopher Fairbank; Neil Fitzmaurice; Dave Johns; Julian Sands; Jason Flemyng; Jill Halfpenny; Stephen Tompkinson; Lindsay Coulson; Sue Johnston
- Cinematography: Niels Reedtz Johansen
- Music by: Guy Chambers
- Production company: Fox International Productions
- Distributed by: 20th Century Fox
- Release date: 9 March 2018 (United Kingdom)
- Country: United Kingdom
- Language: English
- Box office: $280,108

Walk Like a Panther is a 2018 British comedy film directed by Dan Cadan and starring Stephen Graham, Jason Flemyng, Julian Sands, Jill Halfpenny, Robbie Gee, Stephen Tompkinson and Sue Johnston. Filming took place in Marsden, a large village in West Yorkshire.

== Premise ==
A group of 1980s wrestlers are forced to don the lycra one last time when their beloved local pub, The Half Nelson, is threatened with closure.

== Cast ==
- Stephen Graham as Mark Bolton
- Neil Fitzmaurice as Cliff 'Edge' Morris
- Jason Flemyng as Ginger Frost
- Julian Sands as Tony 'Sweet Cheeks' Smith
- Jill Halfpenny as Lara 'Liplock' Anderson
- Robbie Gee as Zulu Dawn
- Christopher Fairbank as Lesley Beck
- Stephen Tompkinson as Paul Peterson
- Sue Johnston as Gladys
- Stephen Marcus as 'Gladiator' Glenn Higgins
- Dave Johns as Trevor 'Bulldog' Bolton, Mark's father
- Lindsey Coulson as Margaret Bolton, Mark's mother
- Adam Fogerty as Danny 'Screwball' Dixon
- Rob Parker as Derek 'Corkscrew' Dixon
- Steve Furst as Popsy Wilson Jr.
- Michael Socha as Ricky Rickson
- Peter Martin as Harry
- Scroobius Pip as Terry
- Alan Rothwell as Douglas
- Ozzie Yue as Percy
- Hannah Walters as Gloria Giles
- Guz Khan as Terry Khan

== Music ==
- The Seekers - "We Shall Not Be Moved"
- Don Harper- "World Of Sport"
- Dexy's Midnight Runners - "Geno"
- Rick Astley - "Walk like a Panther"
- The Coral - "Pass It On"
- Temples - "The Golden Throne"
- Tim Wheeler - "All Star Throwdown"
- The Lightning Seeds - "Perfect"
- Miles Kane - "Don't Forget Who You Are"
- Peaches & Herb - "Reunited"
- Billy Ocean - "Red Light Spells Danger"
- The Housemartins - "The Mighty Ship"
- Rick Astley- "Empty Heart"
- Adam & The Ants - "Kings of the Wild Frontier"
- Jack Trombley - "Eye Level"
- Spandau Ballet - "Gold"
- Jake Bugg - "Kingpin"
- Kasabian - "Comeback Kid"
- Noel Gallagher's High Flying Birds - "If Love Is The Law"
- The Soft Tone Needles with The Atlantic Horns (featuring Lenny Beige) - "Back In The Game"

== Soundtrack ==
On 8 March 2018, Rick Astley released a song and music video for Walk like a Panther.

== Reception ==
The film holds an 8% approval rating at Rotten Tomatoes.
