= Good-Bye Bad Times =

Single by Giorgio Moroder and Philip Oakey

from the album Philip Oakey & Giorgio Moroder
- Released: 10 June 1985
- Recorded: 1985
- Length: 3:42
- Label: Virgin Records
- Songwriter(s): Oakey and Moroder
- Producer(s): Giorgio Moroder

Giorgio Moroder singles chronology
| "Shannon's Eyes" (1985) | "Good-Bye Bad Times" (1985) | "Be My Lover Now" (1985) |

Philip Oakey singles chronology
| "Together in Electric Dreams" (1984) | "Good-Bye Bad Times" (1985) | "Be My Lover Now" (1985) |

"Good-Bye Bad Times" is a song by British singer and songwriter Philip Oakey and Italian producer Giorgio Moroder. It was written by Oakey and Moroder and recorded for the album Philip Oakey & Giorgio Moroder. Released as a single in the UK in June 1985 as the follow-up to Oakey and Moroder's 1984 hit "Together in Electric Dreams", it reached number 44 on the singles charts and remained on the charts for 5 weeks. It was moderately successful in Australia, where it peaked at number 26.

Virgin Records had high expectations for the single but it failed to sell in the quantities forecast. After a final single, "Be My Lover Now", the short partnership between Oakey and Moroder effectively ended. Oakey then returned to work with his band the Human League full-time.

== Music video ==
The music video for "Good-Bye Bad Times" was quite a high budget production as Virgin Records had high expectations for the song after the huge international success of "Together in Electric Dreams". It was filmed in black and white, directed by Steve Barron and has a Victoriana theme. It is set in 19th century London and features unrequited love between a city gent and a pretty working-class girl. Oakey features inset in the early scenes and later as a singer in the background of a music hall dressed in Victorian attire. A paradox of the video is that the modern music is completely at odds with the scenery and story board.

== Critical reception ==
Upon its release as a single, Mike Gardner of Record Mirror praised "Good-Bye Bad Times" as "simple, energetic and none the less effective for all that" and added, "It's not far from the rip-roaring disposable pop the Human League could be releasing if they weren't so self-conscious after the success of Dare." Charles Shaar Murray of NME noted that Oakey and Moroder had "come up with something that could have fallen off the back of Dare" and added that "if you were seriously drunk you could get it confused with parts of 'Love Action'". Maureen Rice of Smash Hits commented, "The usual Moroder electro-beat and the usual Oakey monotone make this an oddly old-fashioned sounding disco record. The kind of record people used to do flashy twirls to about three years ago, in fact."

== Charts ==
| Chart (1985) | Peak position |
|---|---|
| Australia (Kent Music Report) | 26 |
| Luxembourg (Radio Luxembourg) | 28 |
| UK Singles (OCC) | 44 |
| US Hot Dance/Disco Club Play (Billboard) | 20 |
| US Hot Dance/Disco 12 Inch Singles Sales (Billboard) | 17 |
| US Top 75 12" Singles (Cash Box) | 37 |
