= The Lovers (band) =

- Origin: Sheffield, England / France Angelo
- Genres: Electronic
- Years active: 2001–present
- Labels: Voila Records
- Members: Fred de Fred; Marion Benoist
- Website: www.voilathelovers.com

The Lovers are a French electronic dance/neo-burlesque band based in Sheffield, England, consisting of couple Fred de Fred and Marion Benoist. Their music is usually upbeat and satirical of French stereotypes, with songs themed around food and sex.

== Career ==
Benoist is a former bunny girl, who has worked with producers such as Nellee Hooper, and wrote the song "Wonderland", a number two hit for Moloko's Róisín Murphy in the dance charts. Fred had previously worked for Sheffield studio FON. The couple started working on music after meeting Jarvis Cocker, who wrote for them the songs "La Degustation", "Fred de Fred" and "Basque Country", which were later included on their self-titled debut album, The Lovers, co-produced by Dean Honer and Parrot of All Seeing I, Kevin Bacon and Jon Quarmby (Finley Quaye, Pretenders etc...), Leigh Devlin and Robin Downe.

The Lovers have been at the forefront of the Neo-Burlesque/Gypsy Madness movement, often playing with Lost Vagueness. They have collaborated in the past with Richard Hawley, Kings Have Long Arms frontman Adrian Flanagan, Afterflife, and Budnubac, and have also formed part of I Monster's live show. They are accompanied on stage by guitar player Bryan Day and drummer Marc Hoad of Pink Grease.

Their second album Pardon My French was produced and mixed in Austin, Texas by Gabe Rhodes and Joe Gracey.

The band's recordings have been used in a number of advertisements; "La Le" was used in an advertisement for McDonald's, "Crik Crak" on a number of others including Robinsons Fruit Juice, and "French Kiss" on the soundtrack of BBC TV series Sugar Rush.

== Discography ==
- The Lovers (Vinyl 2002 UK)
- The Lovers (UK Limited Edition 2003)
- The Lovers (Special Edition black satin cushion 2005)
- The Lovers (Gut records 2007)
- Pardon My French (Voilà records 2008)
- C'est Euro Cha cha cha (Music House /KPM 2008)
- Ménage à 3 (2009)
