= 1st Man in Space =

Single by All Seeing I and Philip Oakey

from the album Pickled Eggs and Sherbet
- Released: September 1999
- Recorded: 1999
- Genre: R&B, electronic rock
- Length: 3:46
- Label: FFRR
- Songwriters: Jarvis Cocker, All Seeing I

All Seeing I singles chronology
"Walk like a Panther" (1999)	"1st Man in Space" (1999)

Philip Oakey singles chronology
"What Comes After Goodbye" (1990)	"1st Man in Space" (1999)	"Rock and Roll Is Dead" / "LA Today" (2003)

"1st Man in Space" is a song by the English electronic music group All Seeing I, based in Sheffield. It was the third single to be released from the album Pickled Eggs and Sherbet (1999).

It features vocals by Philip Oakey of the Human League on what is essentially an update of David Bowie's "Space Oddity" and Elton John's "Rocket Man". The lyrics were written by another Sheffield musician, Jarvis Cocker of Pulp.

The single reached number 28 on the UK Singles Chart when released in September 1999.

== Track listings ==
=== CD 1 ===
1. "1st Man in Space" (Radio Edit) (3:46)
2. "1st Man in Space" (Album Version) (5:00)
3. "Sweet Music" (7:21)

=== CD 2 ===
1. "1st Man in Space" (Long Version) (5:45)
2. "Dirty Slapper" (6:27)
3. "No Pop I" (3:14)

== Personnel ==
- Philip Oakey - vocals
- Jarvis Cocker - lyrics, guitars

=== The All Seeing I ===
- Dean Honer - keyboards
- Jason Buckle - guitars, bass
- Richard Barrett (DJ Parrot) - drums, programming
