= Kings Have Long Arms =

UK musical group

- Origin: Sheffield, England
- Genres: Electronic rock
- Years active: 2002–present
- Labels: Twins of Evil, Heart and Soul
- Members: Adrian Flanagan
- Website: kingshavelongarms.co.uk

Kings Have Long Arms are an English "rocktronica" act, formed in Sheffield and masterminded by Salford-born Adrian Flanagan (a.k.a. "Longy"). Kings Have Long Arms have collaborated with Philip Oakey from the Human League on the track "Rock and Roll Is Dead", Marion from the Lovers and Mira from Ladytron. They have achieved recognition from the UK media as well as in Europe, where they headlined the 2004 Feedback Festival in Paris. The band takes its title from the saying "Kings have long arms", which is synonymous with the term "the long arm of the law".

The band's debut album, I Rock Eye Pop was released in 2006. It featured former Smiths members Andy Rourke and Mike Joyce, Philip Oakey, vocalist Denise Johnson and Ray Dorset (Mungo Jerry).

Kings Have Long Arms released the single "Big Umbrella" in January 2008 on Domino Records. It featured guest vocals from Candie Payne.

== Discography ==
=== Albums ===
- I Rock Eye Pop (Heart and Soul, 2006)

=== Singles ===
- "Rock and Roll Is Dead" / "Prince Shops at Bardwells" (7" single, Twins of Evil)
- "Re-enter the Two Tone Deaf" / "Rambo's Bullworker" (7" single, Uncharted Audio)
- "Pigeons Carry My News" / "Hot Buttered Booty" (7" single, Chips Records)
- "Rock and Roll Is Dead" feat. Philip Oakey (7" and CD single, Twins Of Evil, 2003)
- "All Hail Satan" (7" and CD single, Heart and Soul, 2005. Produced by Ross Orton (Fat Truckers))
- "Lisa Riley" / "It Feels Like I'm in Love" (Heart and Soul, 2006)
- "Big Umbrella" / "Fishy" (Domino, 2008)
