= HK119 (album) =

Studio album by HK119
- Released: 20 February 2006
- Recorded: London
- Genres: Electro, lo-fi, electronica
- Label: One Little Indian
- Producer: HK119

HK119 chronology
HK119	Fast, Cheap And Out Of Control

HK119 is the debut, eponymous solo album from Finnish multimedia artist and singer-songwriter Heidi Kilpeläinen, performing under her alter ego HK119. The album was released through One Little Indian Records on 20 February 2006 in the United Kingdom.

The album was a collection of Kilpeläinen's home-made 8-track (multitrack) digital recordings, she composed especially for her MA degree course in Fine Art from 2003–2004, which she combined with individual home-made music videos for nearly every track on the album. (Each video's 'character' was portrayed with a unique costume, which collectively formed the "character" of HK119)

It was these videos that initially caught the attention of Icelandic singer Björk, who then featured HK119 in a Q Magazine article, citing her as her favourite artist of new 2004, and ultimately leading HK119 being signed to One Little Indian Records.

The album cover was shot by established fashion photographer Rachel Warner, while the rest of the artwork for the album (and single releases) featured screencaps from the albums relative videos.

== Reception ==
In a largely unfavourable review, Ondarock critic Antonio Ciarletta allowed, "There's a bit of everything in HK119, from freeze-dried Kraftwerk to the bleakest dance music and even a touch of existential ring-a-ring-o'-roses reminiscent of Orchestral Manoeuvres in the Dark."

== Track listing ==
1. "Intro" − 1:13
2. "Friend For Dinner" − 2:59
3. "Malfunction" − 2:39
4. "Pick Me Up" − 3:19
5. "Censor Me" - 2:31
6. "In-valid" − 1:24
7. "23:45" − 2:28
8. "Buy Me" − 2:33
9. "Uber Machine Interval" − 0:08
10. "Last Nation" − 2:48
11. "Candelabra" − 2:19
12. "Neurotica" − 2:35
13. "Power Cut" − 3:25
14. "Too Much Interval" − 0:12
15. "Excess" - 2:18
16. "Outro" - 2:50
17. "Taysikuu" - 2:53

(CD also included hidden bonus track "11th ID", an a cappella hidden in the pregap before track 1 of the disc, which can only be found by manually rewinding/scanning backwards the CD in a stereo system. The track was offered as a remix part for fans to submit a remixed version of the track for a potential future release.)

== Singles ==
- "Pick Me Up" (One Little Indian Records) (2005) (12", 7", CD, DVD)
1. "Pick Me Up"
2. "Pick Me Up (Dean Honer Remix)"
3. "Pick Me Up (HK / Honer Extended)"
4. "Last Nation"
- "Buy Me" (One Little Indian Records) (2006) (Promo single only, Promo CD)
1. "Buy Me (Radio Mix)"
2. "Buy Me (Niyi Mix)"
3. "Buy Me (HK119 Remix)"
