= Dharma Records =

British record label

Dharma Records is a British independent record label. Dharma Records was established in 2002 to run alongside its sister company Instant Karma. Dharma's first release was the top 5 hit single, "Mundian To Bach Ke”, by bhangra artist Panjabi MC.

== Artists ==
Dharma Records' artists include the Mercury-Prize-nominated Helicopter Girl as well as electronic acts I Monster (from Sheffield, best known for hit single Daydream in Blue) and Eberg (from Iceland) both of whose work has featured in many hit films, TV shows and TV ads, including the opening theme of Shaun of the Dead and the TV ad which launched the iPhone in the US, plus modern classical artists such as Ghostland, Caroline Dale, Donna McKevitt and OperaBabes.

Other artists include Amy Belle and the singer-songwriter, Alexander Wolfe, from London whose debut album Morning Brings A Flood garnered significant critical acclaim on both sides of the Atlantic following its release in 2009. The follow-up album by Wolfe, Skeletons, was released in 2012. In 2011, Dharma released BBC Young Folk Award winner Megan Henwood's debut album Making Waves. Her second album, Head Heart Hand, was released on Dharma in July 2015. Subsequent signings include Sheffield's one-off dreampop project Blossomer, whose debut self-titled album was released in 2016, South East London collective GentleFolk plus their spin-off ensemble Cunning Folk whose album Ritual Land, Uncommon Ground, was released in March 2017, and more recently Essex-based singer songwriter Kevin Pearce, whose first album for Dharma, So On, was released in December 2017.

The third album by Megan Henwood was released to widespread critical acclaim in October 2017 ahead of a sold-out UK tour.
