= This Is for Real (album) =

Studio album by Pink Grease
- Released: June 21, 2004
- Genre: Post-punk revival, new wave, glam punk, garage punk, indie rock
- Label: Mute
- Producer: Stephen Lironi

Pink Grease chronology
This Is for Real (2004)	Mechanical Heart (2007)

Professional ratings
Review scores
Source	Rating
Q	4/5 stars
Mojo	3/5 stars
Uncut	4/5 stars

This Is for Real is an album released in June 2004 by band Pink Grease.

== Track listing ==
1. "Remember Forever"
2. "Fever"
3. "The Pink G.R. Ease"
4. "Emotional Retard"
5. "Wind Up Bird"
6. "Peaches"
7. "Nasty Show, The"
8. "Superfool"
9. "Party Live"
10. "Serial Heartbreaker"
11. "High Strung Chironi"
12. "Into My Heart"
