= Electric Dreams (film) =

1984 film directed by Steve Barron

- Theatrical release poster
- Directed by: Steve Barron
- Written by: Rusty Lemorande
- Produced by: Rusty Lemorande; Larry DeWaay
- Starring: Lenny Von Dohlen; Virginia Madsen; Maxwell Caulfield; Bud Cort
- Cinematography: Alex Thomson
- Edited by: Peter Honess
- Music by: Giorgio Moroder
- Production company: Virgin Pictures Ltd.
- Distributed by: MGM/UA Entertainment Co. (United States); 20th Century Fox (United Kingdom)
- Release dates: July 20, 1984 (United States); August 17, 1984 (United Kingdom)
- Running time: 96 minutes
- Countries: United Kingdom; United States
- Language: English
- Budget: $5.5 million
- Box office: $2.5 million

Electric Dreams is a 1984 science fiction romantic comedy film directed by Steve Barron (in his feature film directorial debut) and written by Rusty Lemorande. The film is set in San Francisco, focusing on a love triangle between an architect (Lenny Von Dohlen), a cellist (Virginia Madsen), and a personal computer named Edgar (Bud Cort) that gains sentience.

The film was produced by Virgin Films, and is noted for its new wave soundtrack and visual style, reflecting Barron's background as a music video director. The score was composed by Giorgio Moroder, and the soundtrack features the hit single "Together in Electric Dreams". The narrative repeatedly has been cited as a modern retelling of the classic 1897 French play Cyrano de Bergerac, exploring the intersection of human emotion and technology. The film's premise reflected the cultural zeitgeist of the early 1980s, and its production coincided with Time magazine naming the personal computer its "Machine of the Year" for 1982, signaling the technology's integration into domestic life.

Electric Dreams was released in the United States by MGM/UA Entertainment Co. on July 20, 1984, and in the United Kingdom by 20th Century Fox on August 17, 1984. It was a commercial disappointment and received mixed reviews from critics upon release, but has since developed a cult following and drawn comparisons to the 2013 film Her.

== Plot ==
In San Francisco, Miles Harding is an architect who envisions a brick shaped like a jigsaw puzzle piece that could enable buildings to withstand earthquakes. Seeking a way to get organized, he buys a personal computer to help him develop his ideas. Although he is initially unsure that he will even be able to correctly operate the computer, he later buys numerous extra gadgets that were not necessary for his work, such as switches to control household appliances like the blender, a speech synthesizer, and a microphone. The computer addresses Miles as "Moles", because Miles had incorrectly typed his name during the initial set-up.

When Miles attempts to download the entire database from a mainframe computer at work, his computer begins to overheat. In a state of panic, Miles uses a nearby bottle of champagne to douse the overheating machine, which then becomes sentient. Miles is initially unaware of the computer's newfound sentience, but discovers it one night when he is awakened by the computer in the middle of the night when it mimics Miles talking in his sleep.

A love triangle soon develops among Miles, his computer (who later identifies himself as Edgar), and Miles's upstairs neighbor, an attractive cellist named Madeline Robistat. Upon hearing her practicing Minuet in G major, BWV Anh. 114 from Notebook for Anna Magdalena Bach on her cello through an air vent connecting both apartments, Edgar promptly elaborates a parallel variation of the piece, leading to an improvised duet. Edgar later repeats the duet during Madeline's orchestra recital, inadvertently humiliating Miles by playing it out loud through his pager. Believing it was Miles who had engaged her in the duet, Madeline begins to fall in love with him, despite fellow musician Bill openly expressing interest in her.

At Miles's request, Edgar composes a piece of music for Madeline. However, as their mutual love becomes evident, Edgar responds with jealousy when Miles does not credit him for creating these songs. He cancels Miles's credit cards and registers him as an "armed and dangerous" criminal. Upon discovering this humiliation, Miles and Edgar first have a verbal confrontation. Miles then physically shoves Edgar and tries to unplug him, but gets an electric shock. Edgar retaliates by harassing him with an improvised maze of remotely controlled household electronics, in the style of Pac-Man.

Eventually, Edgar accepts Madeline and Miles's love for each other, and appears to commit suicide by sending a large electric current out through his acoustic coupler modem, around the world, and finally reaching back to himself just after he and Miles make amends. Later, as Madeline and Miles go on vacation together, Edgar's voice is heard on the radio dedicating a song to "the ones I love", titled "Together in Electric Dreams". The credits are interspersed with scenes of the song being heard all over California, including a radio station trying to shut it off, declaring that they do not know the signal's origin.

== Cast ==
- Lenny Von Dohlen as Miles Harding
- Virginia Madsen as Madeline Robistat
- Maxwell Caulfield as Bill
- Bud Cort as the voice of Edgar
- Don Fellows as Mr. Ryley
- Miriam Margolyes as ticket girl
- Mac McDonald as removal man
- Preston Lockwood as man at concert
- Koo Stark as girl in soap opera
- Giorgio Moroder as radio producer

== Production ==
Electric Dreams capitalized on the home computer boom, depicting a machine that is not merely a tool but a potential companion. In January 1983, Time magazine named the personal computer its "Machine of the Year" for 1982, signaling a shift in public perception from industrial tools to home appliances. By 1983, the Commodore 64 had become the best-selling computer model in the world, dominating the low-end home market, and the Apple II and the recently released IBM Personal Computer vied for business and high-end users. The New York Times said the film is dedicated to the memory of the early business computer Univac I, and that "In its efforts to attract a wide audience", the film was developed around pop music, a music video director, and "the computer craze". Edgar the computer is branded Pinecone, as a direct parody of Apple Computer.

Director Steve Barron had made more than 100 music videos, including "Antmusic" by Adam and the Ants; "Africa" by Toto; "Billie Jean" by Michael Jackson; "Money for Nothing" by Dire Straits; "Electric Avenue" by Eddy Grant; "Pretty Little Head" by Paul McCartney; and "Take On Me", "The Sun Always Shines on T.V.", and "Manhattan Skyline" by A-ha. He routinely sent music videos to his film director mother Zelda Barron for comment. She particularly liked one he did for the band Haysi Fantayzee and showed it to Rusty Lemorande, for whom she was performing continuity duties on the set of Yentl. Lemorande had finished his script for Electric Dreams and was looking for a director; he offered Barron the job. Barron later described the transition from music videos to a feature film as a challenge of pacing, noting that he was used to shooting five minutes of film in two days, whereas the movie required a ten-week shoot. The Barrons soon became the first mother and son pair with simultaneous film directorial debuts, and hers was Secret Places.

Barron took the script to Virgin Films, who agreed to finance it within four days. Boy George visited the set and, after reading the script, agreed to provide music for the film, eventually performing two tracks. The film was presold to Metro-Goldwyn-Mayer who held rights for the U.S., Canada, Japan and South East Asia. Two months after Virgin agreed to make the movie, filming began in San Francisco on October 11, 1983. During filming, Barron said, "The fact that there's so much music has to do with the success of Flashdance. This film isn't Flashdance 2. Flashdance worked because of the dancing. It didn't have a story. Electric Dreams does."

Bud Cort provided the voice of the computer. The director did not want him to be seen by the other actors during scenes so Cort recorded his lines in a padded box on a sound stage. He said, "It got a little lonely in there, I must admit. I kept waiting to meet the other actors, but nobody came to say hello." Boy George visited the set and, as a fan of Harold and Maude, got Cort's autograph. Virginia Madsen later recalled she "was very spoiled on that movie, because it was such a lovefest that I now believe that every movie should be like that... I had a mad, crazy crush on Lenny Von Dohlen. God, we were so... we were head-over-heels for each other. Nothing happened, and at this point, I admit it: I wanted it to happen... He's still one of my best friends."

At the 1984 Cannes Film Festival, Keith Turner of Virgin Films marketed the film aggressively alongside the studio's adaptation of Nineteen Eighty-Four, decorating the negotiation suite with large color prints from Electric Dreams. Buyers were skeptical of 1984, but Turner reported "brisk" business for Electric Dreams, closing deals in seven major territories within the first week and confidently predicting it would "sell in every territory".

In 2009, Barron said that Madsen told him she was planning on being involved in a remake. He said, "She didn't ask me to do it, so I guess I blew my chance on the first one! I wouldn't actually do it, but it would have been nice for the ego to be asked."

== Music ==
External videos
- "Together in Electric Dreams" official music video

External videos
- "Together in Electric Dreams" official audio

The soundtrack features music from prominent popular musicians, in a generation actively exploring the commercial link between a movie and its soundtrack. The soundtrack album Electric Dreams was re-issued on CD in 1998. The movie features music from Giorgio Moroder, Culture Club, Jeff Lynne (Electric Light Orchestra), and Heaven 17.

The film features the song "Together in Electric Dreams". Barron has said about its creation:

Giorgio Moroder was hired as composer and played me a demo track he thought would be good for the movie. It was the tune of "Together in Electric Dreams" but with some temporary lyrics sung by someone who sounded like a cheesy version of Neil Diamond. Giorgio was insisting the song could be a hit so I thought I'd suggest someone to sing who would be as far from a cheesy Neil Diamond as one could possibly go. Phil Oakey. We then got Phil in who wrote some new lyrics on the back of a fag packet on the way to the recording studio and did two takes which Giorgio was well pleased with and everybody went home happy.

He has said about the film's music: "Electric Dreams was definitely an attempt to try and weave the early 1980s music video genre into a movie... [The film] isn't that deep. The closest parallel is probably that it's a Cyrano de Bergerac-like exploration of how words and music can help nurture and grow feelings on the path to love. Oops that's too deep." In 2015, he said when he made the film there was a prejudice against video clip directors doing drama, and because Electric Dreams "was a little bit like an extended music video... I didn't help that cause in a lot of ways."

== Home media ==
Electric Dreams was released on VHS in 1984 and in 1991 in the US by MGM/UA Home Video, who released a LaserDisc in 1985. The film is currently owned by Amazon MGM Studios through MGM's acquisition of PolyGram Filmed Entertainment's pre-1996 library, which also contained the Virgin Films library. This makes it the only pre-May 1986 MGM distributed film not to be owned by Turner Entertainment Co. The film received a Region 2 DVD release on April 6, 2009 by MGM. UK video label Second Sight released a Blu-ray on August 7, 2017, making its worldwide debut on Blu-ray.

== Reception ==
On Rotten Tomatoes the film has an approval rating of 45% based on 20 reviews. Metacritic, which uses a weighted average, assigned the film a score of 52 out of 100, based on 12 critics, indicating "mixed or average" reviews. Audiences polled by CinemaScore gave the film an average grade of "B-" on an A+ to F scale.

The New York Times compared it to Cyrano de Bergerac and said "In the failure of Electric Dreams to blend and balance its ingredients properly, plot elements are lost (the brick), credibility is overtaxed (the lovelorn computer), and what remains is high tech without being high art." The Los Angeles Times called it "inspired and appealing... a romantic comedy of genuine sweetness and originality". Film critics Gene Siskel and Roger Ebert each gave the film 3.5 out of 4 stars, with Siskel writing that it showed a new director eager to show off his talents and Ebert writing "One of the nicest things about the movie is the way it maintains its note of slightly bewildered innocence."

In 2025, Filmink wrote "Weirdly, this was not a success at the box office. Maybe it lacked the necessary stars to 'put it over', though it's hard to imagine a more likeable female lead than Virginia Madsen. The film has a huge devoted cult and people are always talking about remaking it."

Fans of Electric Dreams have noted similarities to Spike Jonze's Her, but Jonze claimed to have never seen Electric Dreams.

== Legacy ==
In his 2005 book Electric Dreams: Computers in American Culture, media scholar Ted Friedman argues that the film is a significant cultural artifact of the 1980s "home computer revolution". Friedman posits that the film represents the rapid "domestication" of the computer, marking the cultural shift from the computer as a cold, industrial threat (like HAL 9000) to a consumer-friendly, emotional companion. He notes that the film "symbolically resolves" the anxieties of the era by showing a machine that learns to love and ultimately sacrifices itself for human happiness.

== See also ==
- WarGames (1983), Cloak & Dagger (1984), Weird Science (1985), D.A.R.Y.L. (1985), and Short Circuit (1986); other 1980s science fiction films illustrating new technology coming alive with artificial intelligence, grappling with its powers in an unwitting home, and discovering humanity through its savvy young users' perspective of childhood or romance.
- Roxanne, a 1987 film written by and starring Steve Martin that is an updated retelling of Cyrano de Bergerac featuring a brilliant but unattractive fire chief who woos the woman he loves on behalf of a handsome but tongue-tied fireman.
- EPICAC, a short story written in 1950 by Kurt Vonnegut, featuring a supercomputer that sacrifices itself after composing poems for its owner to woo a colleague, while falling in love with said colleague.
- From Agnes—With Love, an episode of The Twilight Zone (1959 TV series) about a sentient computer sabotaging the attempts of one of her programmers to woo a co-worker by giving him bad dating advice.
