= Steven Claydon =

English sculptor and musician

Steven Claydon (born 1969) is a sculptor and musician based in London.

Claydon was born in London. He has performed and shown work internationally in exhibitions at Tate Modern in London, Art Basel in Switzerland, Kunstverein für die Rheinlande und Westfalen in Düsseldorf and Portikus in Frankfurt am Main.

Claydon was also a member of the now defunct electronica band Add N to (X). In 2005, Claydon had a cameo appearance in the film Harry Potter and the Goblet of Fire as a member of the band The Weird Sisters.
