= Half Loop =

- Severance episode
- The innies get ready for a group photo.
- Episode no.: Season 1 Episode 2
- Directed by: Ben Stiller
- Written by: Dan Erickson
- Cinematography by: Jessica Lee Gagné
- Editing by: Gershon Hinkson; Geoffrey Richman
- Original release date: February 18, 2022
- Running time: 53 minutes

Guest appearances
- Yul Vazquez as Peter "Petey" Kilmer; Michael Cumpsty as Doug Graner; Nikki M. James as Alexa

Episode chronology
← Previous "Good News About Hell"	Next → "In Perpetuity"

"Half Loop" is the second episode of the first season of the American science fiction psychological thriller television series Severance. The episode was written by series creator Dan Erickson, and directed by executive producer Ben Stiller. It was released on Apple TV+ on February 18, 2022.

The series follows employees of Lumon Industries, a biotechnology corporation that uses a medical procedure called "severance" to separate the memories of their employees: at work, Lumon employees, called "innies", can't remember anything outside of work. Outside work, Lumon employees, called "outies", can't remember anything about work. As a result, innies and outies experience two different lives, with distinct personalities and agendas. In the episode, Mark continues investigating Petey's whereabouts, while Helly starts her first day in Lumon.

The episode received highly positive reviews from critics, who praised the performances, directing and production values.

== Plot ==
In a flashback, Helly (Britt Lower) records her statement in which she agrees to subject herself to the severance procedure. Afterwards, Mr. Milchick (Tramell Tillman) takes her to a surgery room, where she gets a Lumon microchip implanted in her brain. Helly reawakens in a stairwell outside the severed floor hallway and realizes that her "other" self is attempting to leave the building; Milchick explains this is an ordinary part of the orientation process and simply has her re-enter the office. (Note: Helly's innie's perspective of this scene is shown in "Good News About Hell".) Helly then experiences a time jump, discovering she has already completed her first day.

In the present, Helly returns to Lumon, where Mark (Adam Scott) explains that her job is to sort encrypted numbers into digital bins as part of "macrodata refinement." She is told she will know which clusters of data to refine based on the emotional response they trigger in her, which she scoffs at; none of the "innies" are aware of what the data represents. Milchick gives her a welcome party, hoping that Mark, Irving (John Turturro) and Dylan (Zach Cherry) help her feel comfortable with her new job. During this, Mark expresses concern over Petey's status, but Milchick is dismissive. After taking a group photo, Helly writes a note to her "outie" and announces she is quitting. However, the elevator's code detectors prevent her from leaving, and she is escorted out by Graner (Michael Cumpsty), Lumon's head of security. Mark claims responsibility and is sent to the "break room" as punishment.

That night, Mark goes on a date with Devon's midwife Alexa (Nikki M. James) and discusses his work at Lumon. As they walk on the street, they run into anti-severance protestors, and a drunken Mark gets into an argument with them. The following day, Mark skips work by calling in sick and decides to go to the address that Petey (Yul Vazquez) gave him in the envelope. (Note: As depicted in "Good News About Hell".) He arrives at an abandoned greenhouse, where he finds Petey waiting for him. Petey shows him a map he has created of the severed floor, telling him he hid a copy in the office for Mark's innie to find, and that he is still unsure how many departments are operating at Lumon. Petey also explains the break room and plays a recording of Mark repeatedly reading out a stringent apology, with Milchick forcing him to repeat the lines.

As Helly and Dylan discuss the purpose of their job, Irving dozes off and begins to hallucinate a black liquid emerging from his cubicle. Instead of putting him in the break room, Cobel (Patricia Arquette) and Milchick send Irving for a "wellness check". As he waits, Irving meets Burt Goodman (Christopher Walken), the head of the Optics and Design (O&D) department, and they bond over their admiration for art. In his wellness session, counselor Ms. Casey (Dichen Lachman) recites various facts about Irving's outie, with Irving forced to react neutrally. Irving is allowed to return to work, where he and Dylan coach Helly through successfully refining her first piece of data. Outside, Mark takes Petey to his home, allowing him to stay in his basement. While taking a shower, Petey experiences severe hallucinations of being inside Lumon and collapses.

== Development ==
=== Production ===
The episode was written by series creator Dan Erickson, and directed by executive producer Ben Stiller. This marked Erickson's second writing credit, and Stiller's second directing credit.

== Critical reception ==
"Half Loop" received highly positive reviews from critics. Matt Schimkowitz of The A.V. Club gave the episode an "A–" and wrote, "Aside from MDR, 'Half Loop' reveals that Lumon's got O&D's apparent two-person team on the floor, led by Burt. Irving and Burt have a meet-cute outside Ms. Casey's office while admiring a painting of Kier. It's an extremely wack piece of art in which Kier is portrayed with a whip, controlling an old woman, a young one, a clown, and a half-human, half-goat. It's weird and given the amount of focus it gets, I'm sure there's a deeper meaning to it. In fact, Severance uses these two episodes to set up an insane number of mysteries. Will each one get a fulfilling answer by the time season one (or even the series) wraps? It's TBD, but I'm along for the joyride."

Erin Qualey of Vulture gave the episode a 4 star rating out of 5 and wrote, "by the end of the episode, Petey is having some sort of episode in Mark's basement shower where his brain can't seem to differentiate between his innie and his outie. His reality skips like a broken record, and it's definitely time to worry about this dude."

Oliver VanDervoort of Game Rant gave the episode a 4 star rating out of 5 and wrote, "The show relies quite a bit on being weird. That can become a bit grating if it's done over and over again, especially if it's done just to be weird. If Ben Stiller and the rest can continue the level of chemistry throughout the series, it will be one of the best on any streaming service this year." Breeze Riley of Telltale TV gave the episode a 4.5 star rating out of 5 and wrote, "Severance takes its time to build up to reveals, but it's time worth spending. The longer you spend in its world the more anxious you become, starting to crave answers like Mark and Helly."

Mary Littlejohn of TV Fanatic gave the episode a 3 star rating out of 5 and wrote, "Episode 1 is just the set-up. Episode 2 creates enough mystery to suggest deep mythology behind this Lumon-based world that is intriguing enough to want to push through." Caemeron Crain of TV Obsessive wrote, "Severance S1E2 leans into the show's premise by devoting a lot of its time to the versions of our characters while they are at work – or the 'innies' as Lumon would have us call them – and it really serves the series well, as the second episode opens a number of questions (both banal and existential) that will surely drive the narrative as it progresses. But it mostly does this by going over the same ground as Episode 1 did, simply inverting our perspective."
