= All Seeing I =

British electronic music group (1996–2002)

- Origin: Sheffield, England
- Genres: Big beat; electronic; trip hop; R&B; house
- Years active: 1996–2002
- Label: London Records
- Past members: Dean Honer; Jason Buckle; DJ Parrot

The All Seeing I were a British electronic music group from Sheffield, England, comprising Dean Honer, Jason Buckle and DJ Parrot (real name Richard Barratt).

== Biography ==
The band released their first single "I Walk" in 1997, but it was not until the year after that they gained mainstream commercial success with the song "Beat Goes On", a remixed cover of the Sonny Bono song, using the vocals from Buddy Rich's version, which were sung by his daughter Cathy.

Their works were something of a Sheffield collective, and the trio worked with artists from the city including Tony Christie, Jarvis Cocker, Philip Oakey, Babybird and many others.Their regular live vocalist was Bozz, who later went on to form electronica duo Hiem.

All Seeing I were asked in November 1998 to produce a cover of "Beat Goes On" for Britney Spears' debut album ...Baby One More Time. They have also remixed a variety of artists, including Pulp.

Dean Honer also fronts the similarly styled group, I Monster.

Buckle went on to be a part-time member of Fat Truckers and formed Relaxed Muscle with Jarvis Cocker. He also has a brief cameo as one of the Weird Sisters rock band in Harry Potter and the Goblet of Fire, along with Cocker, Pulp's Steve Mackey, Steven Claydon of Add N to (X), and Phil Selway and Jonny Greenwood of Radiohead.

Barratt was part of the duo Sweet Exorcist with Richard H. Kirk.

== Discography ==
=== Studio albums ===
Title	Album details	Peak chart positions	
Title	Album details	UK	SCO
Pickled Eggs and Sherbet	Released: September 1999; Label: FFRR (#3984 29241); Formats: CD, CS	45	81

=== EPs ===
- 1999: The All Seeing I – free 5-track promo CD with Jockey Slut magazine (London Records)

=== Singles ===
Year	Title	Peak chart positions				Album
Year	Title	UK	UK Dance	NZ	SCO	Album
1997	"I Walk"	—	—	—	—	Pickled Eggs and Sherbet
1998	"Beat Goes On"	11	1	40	23	Pickled Eggs and Sherbet
1999	"Walk like a Panther" (featuring Tony Christie)	10	—	—	10	Pickled Eggs and Sherbet
1999	"1st Man in Space" (featuring Philip Oakey)	28	—	—	33	Pickled Eggs and Sherbet
"—" denotes items that did not chart or were not released in that territory.

=== Promotional singles ===
- "Megabeat" (1998)
- "Disco Pussy" (1999)
