= Add N to (X) =

English electronic music band

Background information
- Origin: London, England
- Genres: Electronic, experimental, electroclash
- Years active: 1994–2003
- Labels: Blow Up, Satellite, Mute, Rocket Girl
- Past members: Barry Smith (1994–2003); Ann Shenton (1994–2002); Andrew Aveling (1994–1996); Steven Claydon (1997–2003)

Add N to (X) were an English electronic music band formed in London in 1994. The original members were Andrew Aveling, Barry Smith (a.k.a. Barry 7) and Ann Shenton. Steven Claydon replaced Aveling in 1997.

After several releases on small labels, they signed to the independent label Mute Records in 1998, and achieved modest commercial success before splitting in 2003.

Several of their songs and music videos are adult/sex-related: the video for "Metal Fingers in My Body" is an animated short featuring a woman having sex with a robot, and their video for "Plug Me In" features porn actresses playing with sex toys.

== Biography ==
In 1994, Andrew Aveling met Justin Anderson from Freaky Realistic, and together they started a band named Radix Couplment. Andrew was dating Ann Shenton at this time, and got her involved on the project. Andrew then asked his friend Barry Smith (a former Radio Prague DJ) if he too would be interested in joining. They then spent some time gigging under this name before a fall out which led to Anderson's departure from the band. There being only three remaining Andrew then renamed the group Add N to X, based upon a mathematical formula. They kept the name but placed brackets around the X for legal reasons. They then enlisted Steven Claydon, who remained with the group until its dissolution. The band released Vero Electronics (1996) on the Blow Up label.

1997 saw the band twice awarded 'Single of the Week' by the NME (for "The Black Regent" and "King Wasp").

Second album On the Wires of Our Nerves was released in 1998, and was described as "like Stereolab/Suicide with a rocket shoved up their rectum". The album was played heavily by BBC Radio 1 DJ Mary Anne Hobbs on her show, The Breezeblock.

The group performed live regularly, often augmenting their core three-piece line up with either one or two acoustic drummers, and sometimes additional musicians playing extra synths and/or electric guitar. Equipment used live included EMS Synthi AKS (usually thrown around by Barry 7), Korg MS-20, Moog Rogue, EDP Wasp, Omnichord, and ARP 2600.

They often utilized distinctive artwork for the videos and record sleeves, a fetishistic collage of sexual imagery with analogue electronic equipment, based in part on the movie and book Demon Seed.

The band signed to Mute Records and released three more albums, Avant Hard, Add Insult to Injury and Loud Like Nature. They also released the single "Little Black Rocks in the Sun", which was issued on 10 inch hexagonal vinyl. Shenton was reportedly overwhelmed by the pressures of the Loud Like Nature tour, and either left the group or was fired. In 2003, Smith and Claydon continued touring the United States without Shenton. The band broke up shortly thereafter. Barry Smith runs the Horseglue Records store and label with his partner Ethan Reid. Ann Shenton has formed a new group, Large Number, and record label, White Label Music. Steven Claydon is now known for his artwork and in 2006 was included in a group show at Tate Modern. Aveling now plays in Littl'ans.

== Discography ==
=== Albums ===
- Vero Electronics (1996)
- On the Wires of Our Nerves (1998)
- Avant Hard (1999)
- Add Insult to Injury (2000)
- Loud Like Nature (2002)

=== Singles ===
- "The Black Regent" (1997) Satellite
- "King Wasp" (1997) Satellite
- "Demon Seed" (1997) Piao! (split with Fridge)
- "Little Black Rocks in the Sun" (1998) Mute
- "Metal Fingers in My Body" (1999) Mute
- "Revenge of the Black Regent" (1999) Mute
- "Live 1940" (1999) Slut Smalls
- "Plug Me In" (2000) Mute
- "The Poke 'Er 'Ole" (2001) Mute
- "And Another Thing" (2001) Rocket Girl (as ADD N TO FUXA)
- "Take Me to Your Leader" (2002) Mute
