= Together in Electric Dreams =

1984 single by Giorgio Moroder and Philip Oakey

Single by Giorgio Moroder and Philip Oakey

from the album Philip Oakey & Giorgio Moroder and Electric Dreams
- Released: September 1984
- Studio: Musicland (Munich, Germany); Powerplay (Maur, Switzerland)
- Genre: Eurodisco; synth-pop; new wave
- Length: 3:52; 6:26 (extended)
- Label: Virgin
- Songwriters: Philip Oakey; Giorgio Moroder
- Producer: Giorgio Moroder

Philip Oakey singles chronology
"Together in Electric Dreams" (1984)	"Good-Bye Bad Times" (1985)

Giorgio Moroder singles chronology
"Solitary Men" (1983)	"Together in Electric Dreams" (1984)	"The Duel" (1984)

Music video
- "Together in Electric Dreams" on YouTube

"Together in Electric Dreams" is a song by the English singer and composer Philip Oakey and Italian composer and producer Giorgio Moroder. It was written by Oakey and Moroder and recorded for the original soundtrack of the film Electric Dreams (1984). It later formed part of the joint album Philip Oakey & Giorgio Moroder (1985). Released as a single in the United Kingdom in September 1984, "Together in Electric Dreams" reached No. 3 in the UK Singles Chart, staying on the chart for 13 weeks. The single also reached the top five in Australia and had moderate chart success in New Zealand and the Netherlands.

The film Electric Dreams was director Steve Barron's first full feature film. Barron's prior work included conceiving and directing a number of innovative music videos during the beginning of the 1980s. His biggest success up to that point had been as director of the music video for the Human League's "Don't You Want Me" in 1981, which helped the single become number one in the United Kingdom and United States.

== Background ==
For the film, Barron wanted to emulate the huge success of Flashdance a year earlier. Flashdance had used the electronic music of Giorgio Moroder, so Barron enlisted Moroder as director of music, who wrote most of the score. Barron wanted the end credits to roll to "an emotional" song in the same way as Flashdance had done. Moroder wrote "Together in Electric Dreams" as a male solo vocal, and Barron suggested his former associate Philip Oakey for the part. After the initial full recording of the song was completed, Moroder told Oakey that the first take was "good enough, as first time is always best". Oakey, who thought he was just rehearsing, insisted on doing another take. Moroder agreed, though Oakey believes that Moroder still used the first take on the final production.

Speaking of his involvement with the song, Oakey told Smash Hits in 1985,

"It was just a quick thing to do in a robot-like fashion. They sent me a tape, I wrote the words and popped down to London for two hours one afternoon and did it. I never liked that song. I thought it was just an old-fashioned synth record, sub-romantic and a bit sentimental, but my words were good."

"Together in Electric Dreams" was released to advertise the film, quickly overshadowed the film, and became a success in its own right. Oakey stated that it is ironic that a track that took literally ten minutes to record would become a worldwide hit, while some of his Human League material that took over a year to record did not.

"Together in Electric Dreams" is set in the key of E♭ major in common time with a tempo of 130 beats per minute. Instruments used on the track included a Roland Jupiter-8, a triangle and a LinnDrum.

== Critical reception ==
Upon its release as a single, Dave Ling of Number One noted that "Giorgio supplies the dazzling synthwork and Oakey lends his voice to a surprisingly catchy song" and added that the guitar solo "adds a touch of variation and originality". Denis Kilcommons of the Huddersfield Daily Examiner praised it as "very electric, very good" with a "high-powered metronomic rhythm emcompass[ing] a tightly controlled song". Brian Chin, writing for Billboard's "Dance Trax" column, praised the song as "almost too perfect a pop-disco record and a natural for the Eurodisco crowd".

Pedro of Record Mirror felt the collaboration was disappointing and called the song "not the titanic musical equivalent of King Kong vs. Godzilla but rather the chance to get in on the Hollywood film bonanza". Gavin Martin, writing for the NME, was also critical, describing it as "a mess" from two musicians "well past their peak". He added that it's "workaday Moroder with Hysteria-era Oakey, the latter painfully straddling the allure of the synth singles bar and a new love for the pasty dynamics of idiot rock guitar blarge".

== Music video ==
The promotional video was designed to promote the film Electric Dreams rather than the song, and this was how most viewers in the United States would see it. In the United Kingdom, where the film was a flop, the promotional video was perceived to be a music video first, and often erroneously a Human League video.

Like many film soundtrack promos, the video splices key scenes from the film with footage of Oakey. In addition, other promotional scenes were created especially for the video: an Electric Dreams signboard is seen behind Oakey twice, the actual poster is seen behind him on the freeway and the computer from the film is seen relaxing on the beach. Oakey is seen being driven around what is purportedly San Francisco (actually Los Angeles) singing the lyrics. The video concludes with a sock puppet parody of the MGM Lion on a television screen, on a beach. Moroder makes a cameo appearance, as the boss of the radio station taken over by the computer.

== Charts ==
=== Weekly charts ===
Chart (1984–1985)	Peak position
Australia (Kent Music Report)	5
Europe (European Top 100 Singles)	28
Ireland (IRMA)	3
Luxembourg (Radio Luxembourg)	3
Netherlands (Dutch Top 40)	15
Netherlands (Single Top 100)	35
New Zealand (Recorded Music NZ)	29
UK Singles (Official Charts)	3
US Dance Club Songs (Billboard)	20

Chart (2012)	Peak position
Scotland Singles (Official Charts)	36
UK Singles (Official Charts)	46

=== Year-end charts ===
Chart (1984)	Position
UK Singles (OCC)	27
Chart (1985)	Position
Australia (Kent Music Report)	41

== Certifications ==
Region	Certification	Certified units/sales
United Kingdom (BPI)	Platinum	600,000^{‡}
^{‡} Sales+streaming figures based on certification alone.

== In the media ==
- It was used as the theme tune of 2009 BBC Television documentary series Electric Dreams.
- It was used in an advert by EDF Energy in April 2012. This contributed to the song re-entering the charts that year.
- It was the last video played on MTV 80s before the broadcast channel shut down globally on 31 December 2025.

== Association with the Human League ==
Philip Oakey is the lead singer of the British synthpop band the Human League. As "Together in Electric Dreams" was released at the height of the band's international fame and success, it is often erroneously credited as a Human League single. Its popularity has led to it being included in the band's various Greatest Hits compilation albums.

Although the Human League has never recorded their own version, due to the song's popularity the band frequently play their own version when they perform live, often as an encore. The Human League version differs considerably from the Giorgio Moroder produced original in that it has a longer, more dramatic intro and female backing vocals by Susan Ann Sulley and Joanne Catherall, which are as prominent as Oakey's lead.

== Cover versions ==
=== Together in Electric Dreams (EP) ===
Together in Electric Dreams

EP by various artists
- Released: November 2007
- Recorded: 2007
- Length: 23:23
- Label: Sunday Best Recordings
- Producer: Rob da Bank

Together in Electric Dreams is an EP, released in the United Kingdom in November 2007. It was produced by Rob da Bank, and released by Sunday Best Recordings.

The album features five very different interpretations of "Together in Electric Dreams". The only track not especially commissioned for the album was the version by Lali Puna, which had previously been released on the tribute album Reproductions: Songs of The Human League (2000).

==== Track listing ====
1. "Together in Electric Dreams" – Kish Mauve
2. "Together in Electric Dreams" – Le Vicarious Bliss Pop Experience featuring Headbangirl
3. "Together in Electric Dreams" – Daisy Daisy
4. "Together in Electric Dreams" – Subway
5. "Together in Electric Dreams" – Lali Puna

=== Seasonal versions ===
During Christmas 2020, a seasonal version of the song was released by Somerset duo the Portraits and their daughter. In 2021, a similar cover of the song by Lola Young was used in the John Lewis Christmas advert. The John Lewis advert marked the second time in two years that a cover of "Together in Electric Dreams" was used in a major advertising campaign, as an upbeat acoustic guitar-based version by the duo Waters/Kinley was used for a Strongbow commercial in 2019.

=== The Portraits: Release history ===
Region	Date	Format	Label
United Kingdom	18 December 2020	digital download	Sensorypulse; Lifelines Records

=== Lola Young: Release history ===
Region	Date	Format	Label
United Kingdom	4 November 2021	digital download	A Day One; Island
