= Pink Grease =

English rock band

- Origin: Sheffield, England
- Genres: Post-punk revival, glam punk, new wave, indie rock, garage rock, garage punk
- Years active: 2002–2007
- Past members: Rory Lewarne (vocals); Nicholas Collier (synthesizer); Steven SantaCruz (guitar, vocals); John Joseph Lynch (guitar, saxophone); Marc Hoad (drums); Stuart Faulkner (bass guitar, vocals)

Pink Grease were a six-piece rock group from Sheffield, England. Drawing from prominent early influences like David Bowie, Iggy Pop, T.Rex and even Kiss, the band's sound and style was often seen as glam rock while also being heavily influenced by such new wave artists like Duran Duran and punk rock artists like The Damned.

Pink Grease released their debut EP, All Over You, in May 2003 to some minor critical praise. In June 2004, they released the full-length This Is For Real, which saw similar praise and moderate commercial success. Their second album, titled Mechanical Heart, was planned for a release sometime in 2006 or 2007, but after the band split from the record label Mute Records, it is still unreleased and just a few promotional copies exist.

Rory Lewarne now sings with White Witches, who describe themselves as "foppish Celts with glitter in their veins". They released their debut album, Heironymus Anonymous, in 2018.

Joseph John Lynch is now a DT and art teacher in a secondary school.

== Discography ==
=== Albums ===
- All Over You – (mini-album, 5 May 2003)
- This is for Real – (21 June 2004)
- Mechanical Heart – (unreleased, promotional only)

=== Singles ===
- "Working All Day / Manhattan on Fire" – (2002)
- "Waiting So Long / Soul Paco" – (1 May 2003)
- "The Nasty Show" – (27 October 2003)
- "Fever" – (22 March 2004)
- "The Pink G. R. Ease" – (14 June 2004) Chart Position: #75 (UK)
- "This is for Real" – (21 June 2004)
- "Strip" – (10 January 2005) Chart Position: #36 (UK)
- "Peaches" – (28 March 2005) Chart Position: #44 (UK)
- "Ordinary Girl" – (5 June 2006)
- "Alien" – (25 September 2006)
- "Carlights" (29 January 2007) Chart Position: #34 (UK)
