= Philip Oakey =

British singer (born 1955)

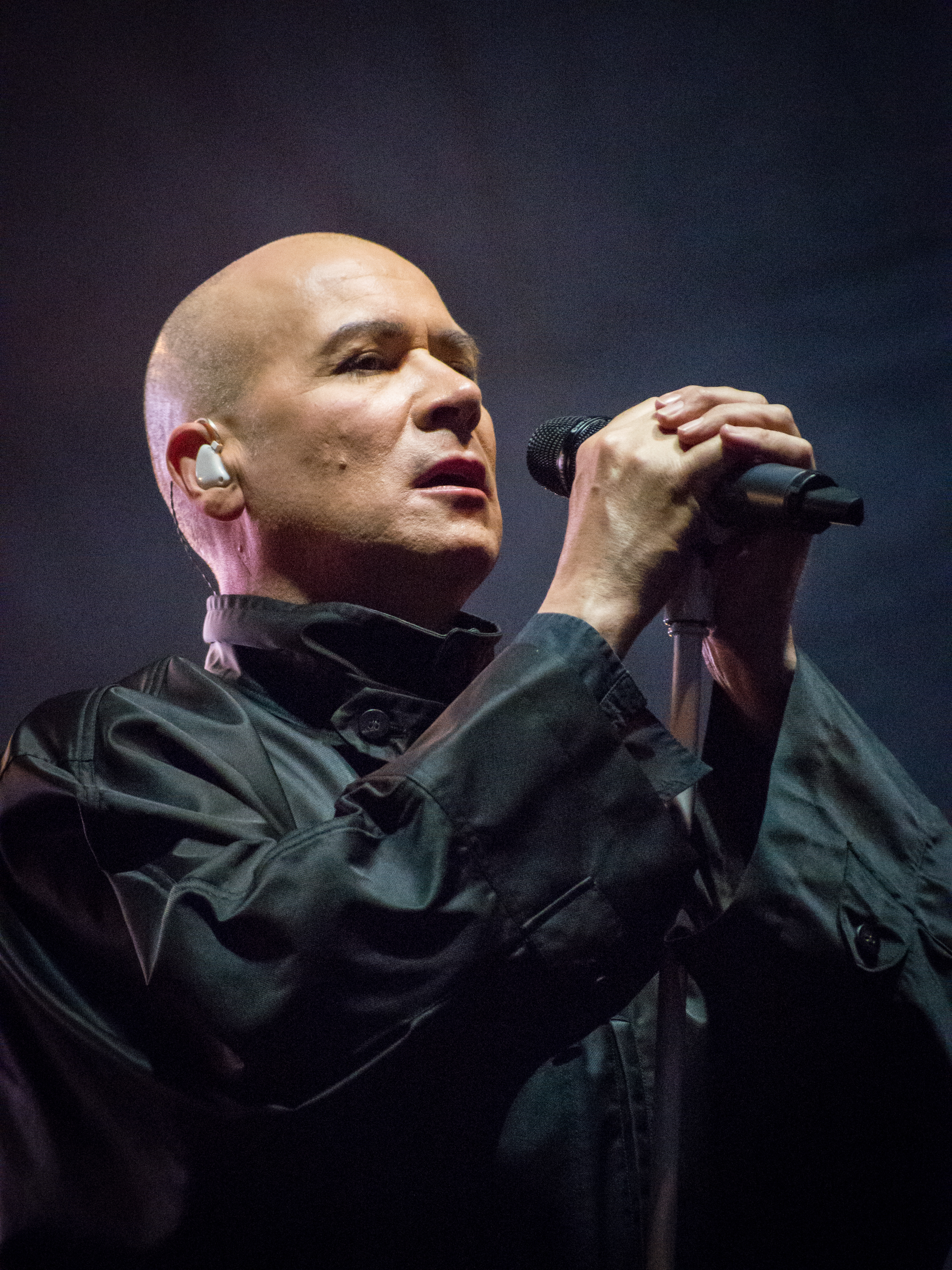
- Oakey performing with the Human League in 2014
- Born: 2 October 1955 (age 71); Hinckley, Leicestershire, England
- Occupations: Singer; songwriter; producer
- Years active: 1977–present
- Spouse: Anthea Helliwell (m. 1978; div. 1980)
- Musical career
- Also known as: Phil Oakey
- Origin: Sheffield, South Yorkshire, England
- Genres: Synth-pop; new wave; electronic
- Instruments: Vocals; keyboards; keytar
- Labels: Fast Product; Virgin; EMI; EastWest; Papillon; Wall of Sound
- Member of: The Human League

Philip Oakey (born 2 October 1955) is an English singer-songwriter who is the frontman and co-founder of the synth-pop band the Human League. Aside from the Human League, he has enjoyed an extensive solo music career and has collaborated with numerous other artists and producers.

Oakey was among the most visually distinctive music artists of the early 1980s. At the height of their success, the Human League released the triple platinum-certified studio album Dare (1981) and Oakey co-wrote and sang the multimillion-selling single "Don't You Want Me", a #1 single in both the US and UK, where it remains the 28th-highest-selling single of all time. Oakey has been lead vocalist of the Human League for more than 40 years. With the band, he has sold more than 20 million records worldwide. He continues recording and performing internationally.

== Early life ==
Oakey was born on 2 October 1955 in Hinckley, Leicestershire. He is of English and Irish descent. Oakey's father worked for the General Post Office and moved jobs regularly: the family moved to Coventry when Oakey was an infant, to Leeds when he was five and to Birmingham when he was nine, attending Catherine-de-Barnes primary school near Solihull and gaining a scholarship to the independent Solihull School. He settled in Sheffield when he was 14. He was educated at King Edward VII School in Sheffield. He left school at 18 without finishing his exams and worked in a number of casual jobs, including one in a university bookshop and as a hospital orderly at Thornbury Annex Hospital in Sheffield in 1977. In 1978, Oakey married his girlfriend Anthea Helliwell, whom he had met at school, but the marriage ended in divorce in 1980.

== Entry into music ==
Oakey's entry into music in 1977 was unintentional. He purchased a saxophone but abandoned efforts to learn how to play it, and he had no aspiration to be in a pop group.

In Sheffield in 1977, Oakey's former schoolmate Martyn Ware, along with Ian Craig Marsh and Adi Newton, had formed a band called the Future. They were part of an emerging genre of music that used analogue synthesisers instead of traditional instruments, a style later termed synth-pop. Although they had recorded a number of demo tapes, the Future remained unsigned. Newton was fired by the band after they were rejected by record companies. Ware decided that the Future needed a dedicated lead singer to replace Newton. His first choice, Glenn Gregory, was unavailable, so Ware suggested Oakey to Marsh. Although Oakey had little music experience, he was well known in the Sheffield social scene for his eclectic dress sense and classic motorcycle. Ware invited Oakey to join the Future by leaving a note on Oakey's front door. Oakey joined the band in mid-1977.

== Human League career ==
In late 1977, the Future changed its name to the Human League, named after an element of a science-fiction board game. The new band played their first live gig at Psalter Lane Arts College in June 1978 (a blue plaque now marks the spot) and signed to Fast Records. The early Human League had a reputation for being arty and enjoyed very little commercial success, releasing two singles, "Being Boiled" and "Empire State Human," with lyrics written by Oakey. They would eventually release two albums, Reproduction (1979) and Travelogue (1980), both recorded at the band's Monumental Pictures studio. Reproduction failed to chart, but after an impromptu appearance on Top of the Pops in May 1980, Travelogue entered the UK Album Chart and peaked at #16. Despite this, the band still had no hit singles and, dogged by the lack of commercial success, Oakey and Ware's working relationship became increasingly strained. During the autumn of 1980, on the eve of a European tour, the tension reached a breaking point and Ware departed, taking Marsh along. Oakey and director of visuals Adrian Wright were permitted to retain the band name but would be responsible for all band debts and the tour commitment. Ware and Marsh soon recruited Glenn Gregory and became Heaven 17.

Facing financial ruin with the tour promoters threatening to sue him, Oakey had less than a week to assemble a new band. In an unplanned move, Oakey visited a Sheffield city-centre discothèque called the Crazy Daisy and recruited two teenage girls whom he saw dancing there, Susan Ann Sulley and Joanne Catherall, to join the band. Oakey had noticed them for their dance moves, dress style and makeup. They were already fans of The Human League and recognised Oakey. He now calls this the best decision of his career, as the girls would be critical in the band's further success, and Sulley and Catherall became Oakey's business partners in the present-day band.

After the tour, the band had their first UK Top 20 hit, "The Sound of the Crowd," in April 1981. Now with the addition of Jo Callis and Ian Burden, the band became a six-piece and went on to release the single "Love Action (I Believe In Love)," which became a #3 hit in the UK. This was followed by "Open Your Heart," which also reached the top 10. Soon afterward they released a full album, Dare, mostly written by Oakey. Dare would soon become a #1 album in the UK and achieve multi-platinum status. At the end of 1981, the fourth and final single from the album, "Don't You Want Me," provided the band with their first #1 single and would sell more than 1.5 million units in the UK, remaining at #1 for five weeks. It also topped the chart in the U.S. the following year, selling another million copies there. By 1982 the Human League were famous worldwide.

Oakey had a relationship with Catherall which lasted several years; the pair remain friends.

The remainder of the 1980s saw the band's success peak and dip, with the follow-up release of the album Hysteria in 1984 underachieving. In 1986, Oakey accepted an offer to work with American producers Jimmy Jam and Terry Lewis, which resulted in the release of the album Crash and the single "Human," which became another international hit and reached #1 in the U.S. However, by 1987, the band had lost most of its members, leaving only Oakey, Sulley and Catherall. In 1989, Oakey persuaded Sheffield City Council to grant a business development loan for the building of Human League Studios in Sheffield, Oakey's dedicated studio for the band and a commercial venture.

After the 1990 album Romantic? underperformed commercially, peaking at #24 in the UK and in 1992, Virgin Records cancelled the band's recording contract. This had a devastating effect on the band, causing Oakey to seek counselling for depression and Sulley to have a breakdown. Oakey recalled in 1995: "We watched Romantic disappear without a trace. Gone, gone into the past with all you've hoped for. […] About that time, I think, I had a low-grade nervous breakdown." Oakey's and Sulley's emotional problems nearly caused the band to dissolve. Thanks mainly to the efforts of Catherall, by 1993 Oakey and Sulley had recovered and the band signed to East West Records, followed by the release of the gold-selling album Octopus in 1995 and the hit singles "Tell Me When" and "One Man in My Heart."

Another change of record label saw the release of the critically acclaimed Secrets album in 2001. Secrets failed to sell because the record label went into receivership, curtailing promotion. After the failure of the project, Oakey lost faith in the record industry and changed the band's focus to more lucrative live work. Since 2002, they have toured regularly and played at festivals such as V Festival and Festival Internacional de Benicàssim, as well as in front of 18,000 fans at the Hollywood Bowl in Los Angeles in 2006.

In 2011, the band released a new album, Credo. Although the album was commercially unsuccessful, the band continues to tour regularly.

== Solo and collaborative career ==
Oakey has worked solo and also with other artists and producers. His first collaboration was producing the Spanish-released single "Amor Secreto" by Nick Fury in 1983 for which he also played synthesiser, together with Jo Callis.

His most commercially successful collaboration was with producer Giorgio Moroder. In 1984 for the film Electric Dreams, he and Moroder provided the film theme song, "Together in Electric Dreams." When later released as a single, it became an international hit, more successful than some of Oakey's Human League singles of the same period.

In 1985, Oakey and Moroder released the joint album Philip Oakey & Giorgio Moroder, which generated two further single releases, "Be My Lover Now" and "Good-Bye Bad Times." Released in both the UK and US, these singles were not as successful as "Together in Electric Dreams" and the Oakey/Moroder partnership effectively ended.

In 1990, Oakey provided guest vocals on "What Comes After Goodbye," the one-off release by the short-lived Sheffield dance band Respect.

In 1991, Oakey collaborated with Vic Reeves on the track "Black Night," a Deep Purple cover.

In 1999, Oakey provided vocals for the single "1st Man in Space" by the Sheffield band All Seeing I. The song was written by Jarvis Cocker.

In 2003, Oakey provided vocals for Sheffield band Kings Have Long Arms on the single "Rock and Roll Is Dead" and worked with producer/DJ Alex Gold for the trance single "LA Today."

In 2008, Oakey worked with Hiem, a band fronted by former All Seeing I lead singer David "Bozz" Boswell, for the song "2 am."

In early 2009, Oakey collaborated with Pet Shop Boys on their tenth studio album Yes, supplying vocals for the intended bonus-disc song "This Used to Be the Future." Also in 2009, Oakey collaborated with British female synthpop artist Little Boots on her first album, Hands, recording the duet track "Symmetry."

== Fashion style ==
Oakey has been considered a flamboyant dresser and fashion trendsetter throughout his career. His commonly referred to as "outrageous" dress sense and original hairstyle would make him an iconic figure of the early 1980s music scene.

Before 1977, during the era of punk rock, Oakey adopted various styles; at one time having a crew cut, he later had collar-length hair and once appeared in a club wearing a household power lead with a plug as a necklace. He also often wore bike leathers and rode a classic Norton motorcycle around Sheffield.

Soon after the Future transformed into the Human League, Oakey wanted a look that would make him stand out from other lead singers. After spotting a girl on a Sheffield bus with a Veronica Lake hairstyle, he was inspired to adopt a lopsided geometric hairstyle, shoulder length on one side and short on the other. Between 1978 and 1980 with his unique hairstyle, he maintained a masculine dress style and at one time wore a full beard.

In 1979, inspired by the 1970s glam rock style of Brian Eno, Oakey began wearing makeup. His style became increasingly more feminine, including the use of bright red lipstick.

By 1981, after the formation of the new Human League, Oakey's trademark style of the early 1980s was complete. Along with full makeup, Oakey had begun wearing androgynous clothing. The 1980 addition of teenage schoolgirls Susan Ann Sulley and Joanne Catherall to the band complemented his look. At times, all three would wear the same eyeliner and lipstick. Oakey and Catherall, who were to enter into a romantic relationship, often looked and dressed almost identically.

The media regularly commented and joked about Oakey's style. He pushed his style further and began wearing high-heeled shoes. He already had both his ears pierced and wore dangling women's diamante earrings. On a 1981 poster, Oakey posed shirtless with pierced nipples linked by a gold chain. Oakey says of his early-1980s style: "I deliberately wore clothes that either men or women could wear. But I don't think I ever really looked like a woman. And I never wore very masculine clothes."

Oakey also appeared in public in full makeup, dressed in his eclectic style. He states that "Sheffield was so accepting that no one ever blinked an eyelid."

At the time of the 1986 Crash album, Oakey wore designer clothes and a manicured look that was inspired by Sean Young's character in the film Blade Runner.

By 1990, the band's popularity had declined. For the Romantic? album, Oakey wore denim and leather and readopted his lopsided hairstyle from 1981 in a rebellion against "the male model look of Crash." The band went through dark times and the style was quickly abandoned.

When the band reunited in 1995, Oakey, approaching the age of 40, appeared with designer clothes and a suave, short, neat haircut. He generally wears a simple Armani suit on the stage.

Oakey has a Prince Albert piercing. In 2007, he said, "Yes, I have a Prince Albert ring. I had it done about six years ago. It didn't hurt too much ... when I pierced my ear it hurt more!"

== Discography ==
=== Studio albums ===
- Philip Oakey & Giorgio Moroder (1985)

=== With The Human League ===
- Reproduction (1979)
- Travelogue (1980)
- Dare (1981)
- Hysteria (1984)
- Crash (1986)
- Romantic? (1990)
- Octopus (1995)
- Secrets (2001)
- Credo (2011)

=== Singles ===
- "Together in Electric Dreams" with Giorgio Moroder (1984)
- "Good-Bye Bad Times" with Giorgio Moroder (1985)
- "Be My Lover Now" with Giorgio Moroder (1985)
- "What Comes After Goodbye" with Respect (1990)
- "1st Man in Space" with All Seeing I (1999)
- "Rock and Roll Is Dead" with Kings Have Long Arms (2003)
- "LA Today" with Alex Gold (2003) It reached number 68 on the UK Singles Chart in April 2003.

=== Guest appearances ===
- "This Used to Be the Future" (from Pet Shop Boys album Yes) (2009)
- "Symmetry" (from the Little Boots album, Hands) (2009)

== Film and television ==
- 1990: Bunch of Five: The Weekenders (TV) (D. Vic Reeves) – played himself
- 1999: Hunting Venus (Buffalo Films, D. Martin Clunes) – played himself
- 2010: Top Gear 15x01 – guest appearance (Jeremy Clarkson's 'Three-Wheeler Report')

== Awards ==
- 1982: BRIT Awards – (as the Human League) 'Best British Breakthrough Act'
- 2004: Q Awards – (as the Human League) 'The Q Innovation in Sound Award'
- Nominated for Grammy Award in 1982 for Best New Artist (as the Human League)
