= I Monster =

British electronic music group

- Origin: Sheffield, England
- Genres: Electronic; trip hop; psychedelic pop; electropop
- Years active: 1998–present
- Labels: Cercle; Instant Karma; Twins of Evil; Dharma
- Members: Dean Honer; Jarrod Gosling
- Website: imonstermusic.com

I Monster are an English electronic music duo, composed of the Sheffield-based record producers Dean Thomas Honer and Jarrod Nicholas Gosling. Best known for their songs "Who Is She?" and "Daydream in Blue", both of which appeared on their 2003 album Neveroddoreven, they have also produced records for acts such as The Human League and HK119, and worked on a documentary about the origins of electronic music.

I Monster and its label Twins of Evil are both named after horror films starring Peter Cushing (I, Monster and Twins of Evil).

== Early life ==
Gosling played in a rock band called Candy Paige as a teenager. Honer left school at 16 and moved to Sheffield shortly after, began producing music and joined numerous bands. In 1990, he opened Neptune studio, a recording studio, together with Duncan Wheat.

== Career ==
=== Formation and Daydream In Blue (1996–2002) ===
Dean Thomas Honer and Jarrod Nicholas Gosling first met in 1991, when a mutual friend introduced them to each other. Honer was setting up his studio and invited Gosling to make music together. Early influences included early Warp Records releases, Fad Gadget and Blancmange. They were already making techno music akin of Aphex Twin, Autechre and Black Dog together for years when they founded I Monster in 1998. Drawing inspiration from the psychedelic rock, progressive rock and easy listening of the '60s as well as Ennio Morricone, they would go buy vinyl records and start to chop them into songs. This was the process that resulted in an early version of Daydream in Blue, which sampled The Gunter Kallmann Choir's version of "Daydream". After finishing their first album These Are Our Children in 1999, the two musicians received an Arts Council grant to press 500 CDs which they had to give away for free, due to sample clearance issues. After being evicted from Neptune studio in 2001, Honer set up Bowling Green studio, where he has been situated since.

Daydream in Blue, which already featured on their first album, was reworked and released as a single in 2001 on Cercle Records, a record label founded by Honer and frequent collaborator Barry Smith of Add N To (X) along with singles from Smith's band and All Seeing I members. Honer describes this era of creative cooperation as "quite a bit of cross-pollination between Add N To (X), the All Seeing I, and I Monster". After British radio host Nemone picked up the song and played it on her show, interest grew in the duo and they signed to Instant Karma shortly thereafter. Daydream peaked at number 20 in the UK charts.

=== Neveroddoreven (2003–2008) ===
In 2003, I Monster returned with their second album Neveroddoreven. The original artwork featuring a skull was created by Gosling under the pseudonym of Varrod Goblink. The duo embarked on a tour after the release, joined by Marion Benoist and Fred de Fred of The Lovers. According to the group, the label mishandled some of the release strategy, leading to them leaving. In 2005, the album was re-released with a new sleeve by Dharma Records.

In 2006, Chicago rapper Lupe Fiasco heavily sampled "Daydream in Blue" on his hit song "Daydreamin'" featuring Jill Scott, popularizing the song even more.

I Monster began collaborating with Finnish pop artist, HK119, for her second album in 2007. The resulting project, Fast, Cheap and Out of Control was released in September 2008 on One Little Indian Records, and saw I Monster co-write and co-produce over three quarters of the album. This collaboration came from Dean Honer's previous role as a remixer for HK119's debut single, "Pick Me Up", from her eponymous debut album in 2006.

=== A Dense Swarm and People Soup (2009–2013) ===
I Monster released their third studio album A Dense Swarm of Ancient Stars in 2009. The cover art was once again designed by Gosling, as well as the artwork for every I Monster release thereafter.

In 2011, the band produced The Human League's ninth album, Credo, their first in 10 years. Joseph Stannard, writing for The Quietus, called the album a "terrific synthpop record" and better than 1981's Dare.

October 2012 saw the duo releasing two albums, Rare and Remixed, both composed of bonus tracks and rarities from "Neveroddoreven".

In 2013, they released a collection of songs that didn't make it onto A Dense Swarm of Ancient Stars under the name of Swarf. 2013 also saw the release of I Monster Presents People Soup, an album heavily featuring a fictional band entirely consisting of female singers over more pop-oriented instrumentation.

=== Bright Sparks documentary (2015–2016) ===
Bright Sparks, a two hour-long documentary, produced by I Monster and Dave Spiers of GForce, about the origins and pioneers of electronic music, was released in 2015, joined later by an accompanying album of the same title in 2016. The feature documentary contains numerous interviews with instrument designers and musicians. The first half of the movie, called "A Side", focuses on US inventors, while the "B Side" features British innovators. Interviewees include Adrian Utley, Daniel Miller, Billy Currie, Karl Hyde, Alessandro Cortini, Will Gregory and many more.

The album Bright Sparks consists of eight songs paying tribute to different innovators of electronic music, including but not limited to Robert Moog, Herbert Deutsch, Ken Freeman, Don Buchla, Harry Chamberlin and Alan R. Pearlman among many others.

Bright Sparks Instrumental, an instrumental version of the album, was released on 19 July 2016 on the group's Bandcamp site. Included on this album is a preview track for Bright Sparks Volume Two.

=== Comeback (2022–present) ===
I Monster didn't release any music in over 5 years, but after the sixth track of Neveroddoreven called "Who Is She ?" gained overnight virality on TikTok in 2022, the duo started work on an expanded version of that album. This resulted in the release of Neveroddoreven (Redux) in March 2024. This version added three new songs and an acoustic version of Daydream in Blue to the end of the album.

The newfound attention on their music also allowed them to tour Europe for the 20th Anniversary of Neveroddoreven, called the Who Are They Tour. They were joined by two vocalists, Jenny Green and Hannah Hu, with visuals created by Katie Mason.

In June 2024, I Monster confirmed they were working on a new album.

== Other musical projects ==
=== Honer ===
Honer, alongside DJ Parrot and Jason Buckle, was a founding member of electronic music group All Seeing I, whose 1998 hit record "The Beat Goes On" was most notably covered by Britney Spears on her debut album ...Baby One More Time. Honer recounts the aftermath of the success as "a flood of work", remixing a lot of songs and even turning a Madonna remix down.

Honer plays in multiple other bands together with long-time collaborator Adam Flanagan, such as The Eccentronic Research Department, The Moonlandingz (together with Lias Kaci Saoudi and Saul Adamczewski of Fat White Family) and The International Teachers of Pop (together with Leonore Wheatley from The Soundcarriers). In 2018, he started a new project with Will Goddard, called Frogman. Their entire output was exclusively released on cassette tapes. The music was created as a soundtrack to a fictional TV series, featuring spoken word written by Goddard and recorded by HK119, Russell Senior, Richard Speight and Terry O'Connor.

In 2020, Honer formed yet another group, Another New Thing, with Don Himlin and Paul Nagle, releasing their debut album XYZZY in 2021 via Dipped In Gold.

=== Gosling ===
Gosling too is part of multiple music projects besides I Monster. The acid folk band Cobalt Chapel consists of him (exclusively on organ) and Cecilia Fage, a London based singer and clarinettist. Creative influences include horror films Valerie and Her Week of Wonders and The Stepford Wives. They released their selftitled debut in 2017. This was followed by Mountain in 2018 and Orange Synthetic in 2021.

Gosling has released multiple progressive rock albums under the alias of Regal Worm. Regal Worm released their first album Use and Ornament in 2013. Gosling was planning his sophomore effort Klara Till Slutet while still finishing Use and Ornament. "It was going to be a concept album" Gosling told in an interview, but it got scrapped. Some of the songs written for Klara Till Slutet were released as part of Dissecting The Worm and Sausages, two EPs which came out later in 2013. 2015 saw the release of Neither Use Nor Ornament, the sophomore studio album by Regal Worm. Pig Views, the final installment of his initial trilogy, came out in 2018. Regal Worm's fourth album The Hideous Goblink was released in 2021. Their sound has been described as a mix of "Canterbury, Psychedelia, Space Rock, Zeuhl and the Rock in Opposition movement". Gosling himself called the Regal Worm output "a continuation of [I Monster], but channeled through a more progressive rock and psychedelic style rather than electronic pop".

== Discography ==
=== Studio albums ===
- 1999 — These Are Our Children
- 2003 — Neveroddoreven
- 2009 — A Dense Swarm of Ancient Stars
- 2013 — People Soup
- 2016 — Bright Sparks
- 2017 — A Dollop Of HP

=== EPs ===
- 2009 — Dear John EP
- 2021 — Monsters of the Deep (Inspired by 'The Outlaw Ocean' a book by Ian Urbina)
- 2026 — Revamped

=== Instrumental albums ===
- 2016 — Bright Sparks Instrumental

=== Compilation albums ===
- 2012 — Rare
- 2012 — Remixed
- 2013 — Swarf
- 2024 — Neveroddoreven Redux

=== Singles ===
- 2001 — "Daydream in Blue"
- 2006 — "As Long as There Is You and Me"
- 2009 — "Lust for a Vampyr Part 1"
- 2009 — "Lust for a Vampyr Part 2"
- 2010 — "Only A Show"
- 2021 — "A Short Song About Snow"
- 2022 — "The Living Dead"
- 2023 — "The Weather"
- 2024 — "The Desert"
- 2024 — "Won't Give Your Love"
- 2024 — "Return of the Blue Wrath"

=== Production Credits ===
Production by I Monster, noted if otherwise.

Release	Year	Artist(s)	Notes
...Baby One More Time	1999	Britney Spears	Production on Track 12 "The Beat Goes On" by Honer as part of The All Seeing I
Overpowered	2007	Róisín Murphy	Co-production on Track 5 and Track 9 by Honer (together with DJ Parrot)
Fast, Cheap and Out of Control	2008	HK119	Co-production
The Art Of Chill 6	2009	Various Artists	DJ mix
Credo	2011	The Human League	
Pocket Handkerchief Lane	2011	Kevin Pearce	Production by Honer
Matthew Hopkins and the Wormhole	2013	Kevin Pearce	Co-production by Honer

== In popular culture ==
The duo's music has featured in movies such as Shaun of the Dead, Riders (Steal) and Endorphine.

Daydream in Blue featured on the soundtrack of Mr. Robot Season 2 Episode 1 called "eps2.0_unm4sk-pt1.tc" and on the soundtrack of Severance Season 1 Episode 2 called "Half Loop".
