= Aztec Camera discography =

- Studio albums: 6
- EPs: 2
- Compilation albums: 5
- Singles: 19
- Box sets: 2

This is a discography for the Scottish new wave band Aztec Camera.

Aztec Camera had success during the 1980s and 1990s with six hit studio albums. They are most recognised internationally for their hit single "Somewhere in My Heart".

== Albums ==
=== Studio albums ===
Title	Album details	Peak chart positions									Certifications
Title	Album details	UK	UK Indie	AUS	CAN	NL	NZ	SCO	SWE	US	Certifications
High Land, Hard Rain	Released: April 1983; Label: Rough Trade, Sire; Formats: LP, MC	22	1	—	97	—	47	—	—	129	
Knife	Released: 21 September 1984; Label: WEA, Sire; Formats: CD, LP, MC	14	—	—	—	44	—	—	29	175	UK: Silver
Love	Released: 9 November 1987; Label: WEA, Sire; Formats: CD, LP, MC	10	—	71	—	—	—	—	—	193	UK: Platinum
Stray	Released: 4 June 1990; Label: WEA, Sire; Formats: CD, LP, MC	22	—	107	—	—	—	—	50	—	UK: Silver
Dreamland	Released: 17 May 1993; Label: WEA, Sire; Formats: CD, LP, MC	21	—	146	—	—	—	—	—	—	
Frestonia	Released: 6 November 1995; Label: WEA, Reprise; Formats: CD, MC	100	—	187	—	—	—	77	—	—	
"—" denotes releases that did not chart or were not released in that territory.

=== Compilation albums ===
Title	Album details	Peak chart positions		Certifications
Title	Album details	UK	SCO	Certifications
New Live and Rare	Released: 25 September 1988; Label: WEA; Formats: CD, LP; Japan-only release	—	—	
Covers & Rare	Released: 25 January 1994; Label: WEA; Formats: CD; Japan-only release	—	—	
The Best of Aztec Camera	Released: 26 July 1999; Label: Warner; Formats: CD, MC	36	26	UK: Silver
Deep and Wide and Tall	Released: 12 September 2005; Label: Warner; Formats: CD	—	—	
Walk Out to Winter: The Best of Aztec Camera	Released: 21 March 2011; Label: Music Club Deluxe/Rhino; Formats: 2xCD	—	—	
"—" denotes releases that did not chart or were not released in that territory.

=== Box sets ===
Title	Album details	Peak chart positions
Title	Album details	UK Indie
Original Album Series	Released: 26 February 2010; Label: WEA/Rhino; Formats: 5xCD	—
Backwards and Forwards: The WEA Recordings 1984–1995	Released: 27 August 2021; Label: Cherry Red; Formats: 9xCD, digital download	27
"—" denotes releases that did not chart.

== EPs ==
Title	EP details	Peak chart positions
Title	EP details	US
Backwards and Forwards	Released: March 1985; Label: Sire; Formats: 10", 12", MC; North America, Australasia and Japan-only release	181
AED EP	Released: 2013; Label: AED; Formats: 7"; Bonus release with the vinyl reissue of Hard Land, Hard Rain	—
"—" denotes releases that did not chart.

== Singles ==
Title	Year	Peak chart positions						Album
Title	Year	UK	UK Indie	AUS	GER	IRE	US Alt	Album
"Just Like Gold"	1981	—	10	—	—	—	—	Non-album singles
"Mattress of Wire"	1981	—	8	—	—	—	—	Non-album singles
"Pillar to Post"	1982	—	4	—	—	—	—	High Land, Hard Rain
"Oblivious"	1983	47	1	—	—	—	—	High Land, Hard Rain
"Walk Out to Winter"	1983	64	3	—	—	—	—	High Land, Hard Rain
"Oblivious" (re-release)	1983	18	—	—	—	25	—	High Land, Hard Rain
"All I Need Is Everything"	1984	36	—	—	—	24	—	Knife
"Still on Fire"	1984	83	—	—	—	—	—	Knife
"Deep & Wide & Tall"	1987	79	—	—	—	—	—	Love
"How Men Are"	1988	25	—	—	—	24	—	Love
"Somewhere in My Heart"	1988	3	—	34	45	6	—	Love
"Working in a Goldmine"	1988	31	—	—	—	30	—	Love
"Deep & Wide & Tall" (re-release)	1988	55	—	—	—	—	—	Love
"The Crying Scene"	1990	70	—	123	—	—	3	Stray
"Good Morning Britain" (with Mick Jones)	1990	19	—	65	—	—	12	Stray
"Spanish Horses"	1992	52	—	143	—	—	—	Dreamland
"Dream Sweet Dreams"	1993	67	—	—	—	—	—	Dreamland
"Birds"	1993	—	—	—	—	—	—	Dreamland
"Sun"	1995	—	—	—	—	—	—	Frestonia
"—" denotes releases that did not chart or were not released in that territory.

== Cover versions ==
- Van Halen: "Jump" (released in 1985)
- Blue Orchids: "Bad Education" (released in 1987)
- "The Red Flag" (traditional song released in 1988)
- Orange Juice: "Consolation Prize" (released in 1990)
- Cyndi Lauper: "True Colors" (released in 1990)
- Cole Porter: "Do I Love You?" (released in 1990)
- Amen Corner: "(If Paradise Is) Half as Nice" (released in 1992)
