= The Best of Aztec Camera =

Greatest hits album by Aztec Camera
- Released: 1999
- Label: Warner
- Producer: Aztec Camera; Roddy Frame; Mark Knopfler; Ryuichi Sakamoto; Michael Jonzun; Rob Mounsey; John Brand; Bernie Clarke; Eric Calvi; Tommy LiPuma; David Frank; Simon Dawson; Russ Titelman

Aztec Camera chronology
Frestonia (1995)	The Best of Aztec Camera (1999)	Deep and Wide and Tall (2005)

Professional ratings
Review scores
Source	Rating
AllMusic	4/5 stars

The Best of Aztec Camera is the first greatest hits album by Scottish pop/new wave band Aztec Camera, released in 1999. Containing singles from the band's first five studio albums High Land, Hard Rain (1983), Knife (1984), Love (1987), Stray (1990) and Dreamland (1993), the compilation also includes selected album tracks, and one solo single by lead singer Roddy Frame, from the album The North Star (1998). No tracks are included from Frestonia (1995), Aztec Camera's final studio album.

== Track listing ==
All tracks written by Roddy Frame, except where noted.

No.	Title	Origin	Length
1.	"Somewhere in My Heart"	Love	4:02
2.	"Oblivious"	High Land, Hard Rain	3:12
3.	"Good Morning Britain"	Stray	4:03
4.	"Working in a Goldmine"	Love	5:43
5.	"How Men Are"	Love	3:41
6.	"Birth of the True"	Knife	2:42
7.	"Pillar to Post"	High Land, Hard Rain	4:02
8.	"Walk Out to Winter"	High Land, Hard Rain	3:25
9.	"All I Need Is Everything"	Knife	5:50
10.	"Deep & Wide & Tall"	Love	4:05
11.	"Jump" (writers: Eddie Van Halen, Alex Van Halen, David Lee Roth, Michael Anthony)	B-side to "All I Need Is Everything"	2:51
12.	"Killermont Street"	Love	3:19
13.	"The Crying Scene"	Stray	3:36
14.	"Spanish Horses"	Dreamland	4:37
15.	"Reason for Living"	The North Star (Roddy Frame solo album)	3:17
16.	"We Could Send Letters"	High Land, Hard Rain	5:45

== Charts ==
Chart performance for The Best of Aztec Camera
Chart (1999)	Peak position
Scottish Albums (OCC)	26
UK Albums (OCC)	36

== Certifications ==
Region	Certification	Certified units/sales
United Kingdom (BPI)	Silver	60,000^{^}
^{^} Shipments figures based on certification alone.
