= Dreamland (Aztec Camera album) =

Studio album by Aztec Camera
- Released: 17 May 1993
- Recorded: 1991, August 1992 – February 1993
- Studios: Right Track, New York
- Genres: Alternative rock, synthpop
- Length: 51:17
- Label: WEA
- Producers: Ryuichi Sakamoto, Roddy Frame

Aztec Camera chronology
Stray (1990)	Dreamland (1993)	Frestonia (1995)

Singles from Dreamland
- 1. "Spanish Horses" Released: 6 July 1992; 2. "Dream Sweet Dreams" Released: April 1993; 3. "Birds" Released: July 1993

Dreamland is the fifth studio album by the alternative rock band Aztec Camera, released in 1993. Roddy Frame collaborated with Japanese maestro Ryuichi Sakamoto for this album.

The album peaked at No. 21 on the UK Albums Chart and at number 146 on the Australian ARIA Charts.

== Background ==
Unlike the previous Aztec Camera albums', for 'Dreamland', Roddy largely retained the core from the previous album 'Stray', retaining Paul Powell on Bass and Gary Sanctuary on keyboards, however there were still a host of collaborators, the most prominent being Japanese legend Ryuichi Sakamoto's introduction as the producer on the album, which gave the album a sound unlike any other Aztec Camera album before.

The pair first met in Ibiza, and decided to work together after Roddy saw Sakamoto play in 1991's 'Festival of Japan' at the Hammersmith Odeon, although Roddy was skeptical if Ryuichi would work with him or even know of Aztec Camera at all.

Roddy was inspired by Ryuichi's work on film-scores (Merry Christmas Mr. Lawrence, The Last Emperor) and in the 'Yellow Magic Orchestra'. Talking about their first encounter in Ibiza, about how he was surprised at Ryuichi's knowledge of previous Aztec Camera records:

I liked what he did when he was in the Yellow Magic Orchestra, and I also liked that album where he plays the music from 'Merry Christmas, Mr. Lawrence' on piano. That's where you realise that the atmosphere around his compositions is actually in the writing - it's got nothing to do with synthesizers. Eventually we met in a club in Ibiza, at the height of that Balearic beat, E-culture business. And he knew about Aztec Camera, which surprised me.

— Roddy Frame, in Giles Smith, The Roddy and Ryuichi roadshow, The Independent (5 May 1993)

Roddy expected Ryuichi's approach to be more 'academic' due to his reputation as "The Professor", but was surprised to find much of Ryuichi's ideas and compositions came from improvisation and intuition. Furthermore, Roddy was inspired by Sakamoto's 'beautiful piano playing' which heavily influenced the textures and mood of the record, stating that 'Ryuichi tends not to fully state each chord, so that the songs became more airy, less grounded.'

According to Roddy, the collaboration with Ryuichi resulted in some of the simplest songs he'd ever written ('Let Your Love Decide') and that the record sounded like 'High Land Hard Rain' but with "money spent on it". However he also stated that he understood why the band's audience and wider public might have a difficult time coming to terms with the record due to the proliferation of rap and rock records at the time, in contrast to the mellow textures of Dreamland.

Three of the album's tracks were debuted live in an acoustic setting before its release: "Spanish Horses", "Sister Ann" and "Let Your Love Decide", at Ronnie Scott's in 1991.

== Recording and Composition ==
Roddy talked about the process of working with Ryuichi, and how his unconventional production style lent the songs a 'suppleness':

Ryuichi's unlike a lot of producers in that he doesn't work from the drums upwards. Often he would set up a little percussive loop and you would build the entire song around that. So that everything you played was in response to that percussive lick. And more often than not, he would take that percussive loop out altogether in the end, or it would just become a tiny feature of the track, when in fact it was the backbone. [...]

Halfway through the day in the studio, he will stop and play some hip hop or some house for 10 minutes, and then go back to what he was doing. He's always trying to trip himself up like that, and to discover new things. Just before we worked together he'd been out in Borneo, I think, with a DAT machine, looking for new sounds.

— Roddy Frame, in Giles Smith, The Roddy and Ryuichi roadshow, The Independent (5 May 1993)

Roddy experimented with lowering the key of his voice, at Ryuichi's suggestion:

[I found myself] dropping my voice, so I could sit real close on the mic and get a real intimacy that you don't ordinarily get [on the vocals].

— Roddy Frame, in Giles Smith, The Roddy and Ryuichi roadshow, The Independent (5 May 1993)

Some of the songs were inspired by different cities:

'Black Lucia' was inspired by Stockholm, where Roddy spent time around Christmas and saw the 'St. Lucia' festival. Conventionally, the 'Lucia' chosen to lead the parade is a native, however during Roddy's visit, he saw a Black South African girl undertake the role of Lucia.

'Vertigo' was inspired by Zurich as well as New York, where Roddy first realized that he suffered from the condition, when he attempted to climb the Williamsburg Bridge with friends of his who were a couple. Later, when he visited them in Zurich, they attempted to climb the observation towers near a mountain range, where Roddy observed many couples reach the top, whilst he couldn't due to vertigo. This set the tone for the track lyrically, which serves as a metaphor for being unable to reach a height only lovers can reach. The track also references the Captain Beefheart song 'Frownland', with Frame adding:

I was writing that song and trying to think of a second verse while I was listening to Captain Beefheart and that line seemed to fit, some people sample, I just kind of steal as a homage.

— Roddy Frame, in Craig Rosen, Sire/Reprise Focusing on New Aztec Camera Set, Billboard Magazine (19 June 1993)

'Spanish Horses' was inspired by the Spanish band 'Ketama', who were pioneers of the 'Nuevo Flamenco' movement. Furthermore Roddy's trip through Spain inspired him, specifically Barcelona, calling it a 'spiritual home' and how the similarity between the Catalan culture in comparison to Scottish culture moved him.

'Safe in Sorrow' was inspired by Roddy playing with Al Green whilst he was in Boston, explaining that "'Safe in Sorrow' is that Al Green feel, a kind of Al Green shuffle" 'Let Your Love Decide' is about being in love with someone who you can't be with, as Roddy explained:

I was just playing the guitar. And I really wanted to go out with this girl, and ... I couldn't really. I embellished it when we got to the studio with violins and trumpet solos, and all that yearning.

— Roddy Frame, in Alistair McKay, The Candid Camera Views, Scotland on Sunday (5 September 1993)

'Sister Ann' is a song about and inspired by, Ann Adams, a friend of Roddy's, who was a nun that later went onto work as a clinical therapist. Ann wrote a book called 'The Silver Boat', a metaphorical story with the aim of helping children who developed disorders due to suffering abuse in their childhood.

In a retrospective interview of the band's catalogue in 1999, Roddy stated the following about the album:

More than any other record, I think that was a true collaboration. That's when I consciously tried to hand over the reins a bit. It kind of backfired in a way, I suppose, because he wanted to make a record that sounded like High Land, Hard Rain and I wanted to make one that sounded like Merry Christmas, Mr Lawrence. We worked it out somehow, but he took a lot of persuading to plug the keyboards in and I took a lot of persuading to bang on the acoustic guitar again. For me, the tracks where it works best are things like Spanish Horses, which was completely experimental, just sampling hand-claps and flamenco records and layering my guitar on top of it.

— Roddy Frame, in Alistair Mabbott, Aztec Relics, The Scotsman (17 July 1999)

As a result of Roddy and Ryuichi's collaboration, Roddy appeared on Ryuichi's solo album the following year, 1994's 'Sweet Revenge' providing lyrics and vocals on the track "Same Dream, Same Destination".

== Release and Critical reception ==
Professional ratings
Review scores
Source	Rating
AllMusic	3/5 stars
MusicHound Rock: The Essential Album Guide	3/5 stars
NME	6/10
Rolling Stone	2/5 stars
Uncut	8/10

The album was released on 17 May 1993, however the album came with significant delays, much of the album was mixed as early as August of 1992, however at the behest of the record label, Roddy added another song to the album for the purposes of a single, which turned out to be "Dreams Sweet Dreams".

What also factored into the delay was producer Ryuichi Sakamoto's haphazard schedule, as Dreamland was primarily put to tape in a period of heavy activity for the Japanese composer, within a month.

The Independent praised the album and Ryuichi's role as producer, calling it "the most consistent album Roddy has made" and "a summer record, thanks to the touch of Ryuichi Sakamoto, whose methods seem to thicken the air in which the songs travel".

NME's John Dee wrote that "the album sounds too much like his [Roddy] ideal for "proper" music" however adding that "there are sweet moments", and that "those who harbour visions of Roddy as a romantic troubadour, will be truly delighted".

While reviewing the 2012 reissues of the band's catalogue, Uncut's Alastair McKay called it a "sweet, soulful album".

Trouser Press wrote that Roddy Frame "approaches a nirvana of cerebral passion on 'Valium Summer', 'Let Your Love Decide' and other ethereal treats."

In a 2021 retrospective review of Aztec Camera's catalogue, Rob Arcand of Pitchfork remarked that "Frame remains an intrepid lyricist unafraid to take his ballads into uncharted territory" and "Dreamland isn’t completely devoid of the arrangements that characterized earlier Aztec Camera releases, and even its most experimental tendencies feel firmly at home within the band’s extended catalog."

The album also restored Aztec Camera and Roddy Frame's popularity in Japan, which took a hit after the Love album, which much of the band's audience in Japan saw as "selling out".. The major factor was the involvement of Ryuichi Sakamoto, who had a large following in Japan. Additionally, the song "The Belle of the Ball" was used as one of the main theme songs in the reality TV show Gachinko!

== Track listing ==
All songs produced by Ryuichi Sakamoto except "Dream Sweet Dreams" produced by Roddy Frame.

All lyrics are written by Roddy Frame; all music is composed by Roddy Frame.

No.	Title	Length
1.	"Birds"	4:56
2.	"Safe in Sorrow"	4:56
3.	"Black Lucia"	4:00
4.	"Let Your Love Decide"	5:03
5.	"Spanish Horses"	4:34
6.	"Dream Sweet Dreams"	3:26
7.	"Pianos and Clocks"	4:53
8.	"Sister Ann"	5:13
9.	"Vertigo"	4:54
10.	"Valium Summer"	5:53
11.	"The Belle of the Ball"	3:24

== Personnel ==
Musicians

- Roddy Frame – Vocals, Acoustic guitars, Electric guitars, Keyboards, Programming, Production (track 6)
- Ryuichi Sakamoto - Production (tracks 1-5, 7-11), Sampling, Keyboards, Piano, Percussion, Synthesizers, Programming
- Paul Powell - Bass Guitar
- Garry Tibbs - Bass Guitar
- Victor Bailey - Bass Guitar
- Gary Sanctuary - Keyboards
- David Palmer - Drums
- Steve Sidelnyk - Drums
- Nana Vasconcelos - Percussion
- Romero Lubambo - Additional Guitar
- Steve Bernstein - Trumpets (track 4)
- Barry Finclair - Violins (track 4)
- Sylvia Mason James - Backing Vocals
- Vivian Saunders - Backing Vocals
- Rosia Ania - Backing Vocals

Engineers

- Julian Mendelsohn - Mixing
- David Anderson
- Patrick Dillett
- Paul Gomersall
- Lolly Grodner

Assistant engineers

- Jim Caruana
- Hoover Le
- Tim Leitner
- Danton Supple
