= All I Need Is Everything =

Single by Aztec Camera

from the album Knife
- Released: September 1984
- Length: 4:00
- Label: WEA/Sire
- Songwriter(s): Roddy Frame
- Producer(s): Mark Knopfler

Aztec Camera singles chronology
"Oblivious" (1983)	"All I Need Is Everything" (1984)	"Still on Fire" (1984)

"All I Need Is Everything" was the first single off the album Knife by Scottish new wave band Aztec Camera. The single was released in September 1984 and reached number 34 on the UK Singles Chart, remaining on the chart for six weeks. The single version is two minutes shorter than the album version, which has an extended fadeout. According to a 1984 interview with Roddy Frame, the song was written in March 1984 while he was touring the United States. Frame called it an "unusual choice for a single, because unlike our previous singles (and most pop singles) it doesn't have a recurrent chorus at all." The song's music video was in light rotation on MTV in autumn 1984.

The unusual B-side of the single, a downbeat acoustic cover of "Jump" by Van Halen, drew positive attention.
