= Stray (album) =

Studio album by Aztec Camera
- Released: 4 June 1990
- Recorded: December 1989 – April 1990
- Studios: Rockfield, Wales
- Genre: Rock
- Length: 41:11
- Labels: WEA, Sire
- Producers: Roddy Frame, Eric Calvi

Aztec Camera chronology
Love (1987)	Stray (1990)	Dreamland (1993)

Stray is the fourth album by Scottish group Aztec Camera, released in June 1990 on WEA in the UK and on Sire Records in the US.

Stray was praised for its diversity of songs and styles, and for the assured nature of Roddy Frame's lyrics (which had been considered the weak-point of some of his earlier material). Its understated production was also received positively, particularly coming after the group's previous album Love, which sold well in the United Kingdom however, alienated part of the band's audience, who didn't respond well to the 'American' and 'sleek' production and soft soul leanings of many of the songs.

Stray peaked at No. 22 in the UK Albums Chart. With the single "Good Morning Britain", a collaboration with Mick Jones formerly of The Clash, reaching No. 19 in the UK Singles Chart.

== Background ==
For Stray, Roddy returned Aztec Camera to a conventional band line-up. Longtime drummer Dave Ruffy left the band prior to the sessions for Stray - to work with Sinead O'Connor - who according to Roddy was a 'backbone' for the band. The new lineup assembled consisted of bassist Paul Powell, drummer Frank Tontoh, and keyboardist Gary Sanctuary.

Around the 'Love' tour, Madchester and House music took off, Roddy admitted to liking the music, however denied any influence of acts such as Happy Mondays or The Stone Roses on the album, saying:

"With the Happy Mondays... I went to see them play Wembley recently, and they were just fantastic. They really reminded me of a band from Manchester called 'The Fall' that I grew up with, I think its the same kind of music because its really hypnotic to the point of being sort of moronic and demented. I like that aspect of their music."

He added that he had written and recorded House music himself, and considered looking for a female vocalists to do the songs, before deciding against it, as it didn't suit his 'natural style'. He insinuated that it was closer to Chicago House rather than the active British or Deep House at the time in 1990.

As he'd spent 18 months playing Keyboards and Programming while preparing for Love, he found himself in the position of being a guitarist again while on tour. Hence, he found there less of a need to use programming on Stray, but defied any notion that he was going "back-to-basics", insisting that "you just choose whatever is right for the songs'".

Roddy commented on outside opinions influencing his music, admitting that "on the first album, I was quite precious with the songs",

"When I'm in the studio, I'll drag in the receptionist and ask her what she thinks of the bass [...] I've asked for everyone's opinion - from the guy who's second engineer to whoever's in the room at the time."

Asked to sum up the influences on Stray, he commented:

"Johnny Thunders, The Byrds, Wes Montgomery, Django Reindhart, Vini Reilly, and I think the guitar's the most expressive instrument, I feel really at home with it again. But all that might change, I might end up making ambient music next year!"

== Writing and composition ==
The songs on Stray began to take shape while Aztec Camera toured in support of 'Love' during 1988. At the end of the sessions, he concluded the album shaped up his listening habits, stating "I really wear my influences on my sleeve, this time around":

"You would have Wes Montgomery followed by Anita Baker and the Clash, I fell in love with the guitar again."

Furthermore, he described the evolution of writing albums leading up to 'Stray' as "less precious, more careless", adding:

"With 'Stray' I let a lot of things go. I used to go through albums with a fine-tooth comb. On the 'Love' album I was a bit Scritti Politti, know what I mean? ..."

The title track 'Stray' samples the World Saxophone Quartet album 'Live at Brooklyn Academy of Music' , who are also referenced to in the lyrics:

"And these are the notes from the overground. The World Saxophone Quartet, the smell of violets..."

Roddy declared the song "Over My Head" as his tribute to Wes Montgomery, and admitted the 'Clash' leanings on "Good Morning Britain", a duet with Mick Jones, which Roddy wrote for Mick while he was ill:

"I found out afterward I'd stolen half of the melody line from 'Rudie Can't Fail'. I hope Strummer never hears it!"

He declared the song as one of his best, and recalled the time he approached Mick to do the track:

"I went round to his house and he opened the door and I said, 'Mick, here's a rough tape. This is my new song. I've written these words and you're either gonna sue me or you'll want to sing with me'..."

The origins of the track "How It Is" lay in Roddy visiting co-producer Eric Calvi in New York:

"It was around the time of the Central Park rape and the way it was reported really got my back up. I don't care so much about meaning and meaningless any more. I've been from Sartre to Baudrilliard and, in between, I've found Andy Warhol so I don't care so much. But there's a couple of things I hate about this world - racism and sexism. And the fact that someone was raped and the media made a racist issue out of it screwed me up a bit. Instead of looking at it as an issue of sex or violence, they looked at it as an issue of racism - the black man and the white woman and all that. It freaked me out and that's why I wrote the song. The racism and sexism in New York really fucking stinks so badly it's almost as bad as London..."

Additionally, it was also influenced by "corporate culture" and Roddy admitted the sound of the song was deliberately "very American" and "very Stones-y", likening it to "Honky Tonk Women"

"Get Outta London", while its lyrics indicate an "anti-London" leaning, Roddy insisted otherwise, stating that it came from a few bewildering experiences in London and Brussels, the first of which was being pulled out by cops in London and asked to check his pockets'.

Feeling that London has gone "right downhill" and that working-class people are being pit against each other, he went to visit a friend in Brussels. Once in Brussels, he went out to a "beat" club where the song "In the Air Tonight" by Phil Collins played, further dismayed, Roddy went back to London the next day. He concluded by saying the song could've been titled 'Get Outta Brussels', and that it followed on from the Bob Seger song "Get out of Denver".

"Song for a Friend" was originally titled "Song for K.J. Adams", and was written for Kathy, Roddy's wife at the time. It was introduced with the original title at a live performance in 1988, before the title was changed on the album release.

Roddy expanded on the album's various styles and themes on Stray:

"When I looked at the lyrics to this album, it occurred to me it was all about Britain but I didn't want to call it 'Good Morning Britain' because that's a stupid name. So I just decided to call it 'Stray' because that's what it is really, just a kind stray through all kinds of musical territories and different vibes..."

However, he worried that the diversity of the album would be a flaw in the eyes of the public:

"It's really confused and unfocused. [...] Sometimes I put it on and I think, 'Maybe it could've been a rock album or a jazz album'."

Talking retrospectively of the band's catalogue in 1999 to The Scotsman, Roddy expanded upon his vision for the album as a reflection of his record collection:

"At the time, all I really wanted to do was reflect my record collection on one album. It's quite easy to hear where each song comes from. [...] 'Good Morning Britain' is obviously from listening to The Clash and hanging out with Mick Jones, that was a big dream come true for me, because I went to see them at The Apollo when I was 13, and 'The Crying Scene' has got that Johnny Thunders guitar solo on it. It's an album about my favourite guitarists, really, if you think about it. A little nod of the head to all those guys."

== Equipment ==
In a rarity for Roddy, he talked about the equipment and guitars used during the making of the album: Akai S900, Yamaha DX7, Roland D-550, Korg Piano, Yamaha NS-10, Tascam 388, Boss Distortion Pedal, Vox AC30, Marshall-100, Power Soak.

For Guitars, he used a 1959 Cream Stratocaster, a Scheter Telecaster with 'three Seymour Duncan strat pickups', a small Takamine, and a Masano (a Japanese copy of Martin's).

On the title track, he plays an Ovation Six-String. He uses a Red Gibson-355 on 'Over My Head'.

== Release ==
To promote Stray, the band embarked on a brief tour of the United States in late 1990, followed by an acoustic tour of the UK in mid-1991.

== Reception ==
Professional ratings
Review scores
Source	Rating
AllMusic	4/5 stars
Alternative Rock	8/10
Robert Christgau	B+
New Musical Express	7/10
The Rolling Stone Album Guide	3.5/5 stars

In a 2013 review of Aztec Camera reissues, Uncut called Stray "the most inventive and durable Aztec Camera LP. Diverse, yes, but it’s exhilarating to hear Frame switching-up from plaintive balladry ('Over My Head') to the BAD-influenced 'Good Morning Britain.'"

The Rolling Stone Album Guide called the album "leaner and more melodic" and praised the "fine jazz-inflected numbers."

Author Dave Thompson wrote in his book Alternative Rock (2000) that "The Crying Scene" and "Notting Hill Blues" "alone repair the damage of Love's big sheen over-production," going on to highlight "Good Morning Britain" for its charm.

Rob Arcand, writing for Pitchfork, in a review of Aztec Camera's back catalogue on Warner in 2021, stated that "the album feels uniquely nostalgic for the rock and jazz records that informed Aztec Camera from the start."

== Track listing ==
All songs written by Roddy Frame.

No.	Title	Length
1.	"Stray"	5:33
2.	"The Crying Scene"	3:34
3.	"Get Outta London"	3:41
4.	"Over My Head"	5:53
5.	"Good Morning Britain"	4:02
6.	"How It Is"	4:00
7.	"The Gentle Kind"	5:32
8.	"Notting Hill Blues"	6:41
9.	"Song for a Friend"	2:27
Total length:		41:27

== Personnel ==
- Roddy Frame – Vocals, Guitars, Sampling
- Gary Sanctuary – Keyboards
- Paul Powell – Bass guitar
- Frank Tontoh – Drums and Backing Vocals

Additional Musicians:

- Paul Carrack
- Edwyn Collins
- Mickey Gallagher - Keyboards
- Steve Sidelnyk - Drums
- Mick Jones - Vocals (on 'Good Morning Britain')

Production:

- Roddy Frame, Eric Calvi - Production
- Eric Calvi, Simon Dawson - Engineering
- Cameron Jenkins - Assistant Engineer
- Nick Davies - Mixing
- Chris Blair - Mastering
