= Norfolk Arms =

Listed pub in Marple Bridge, Greater Manchester, England

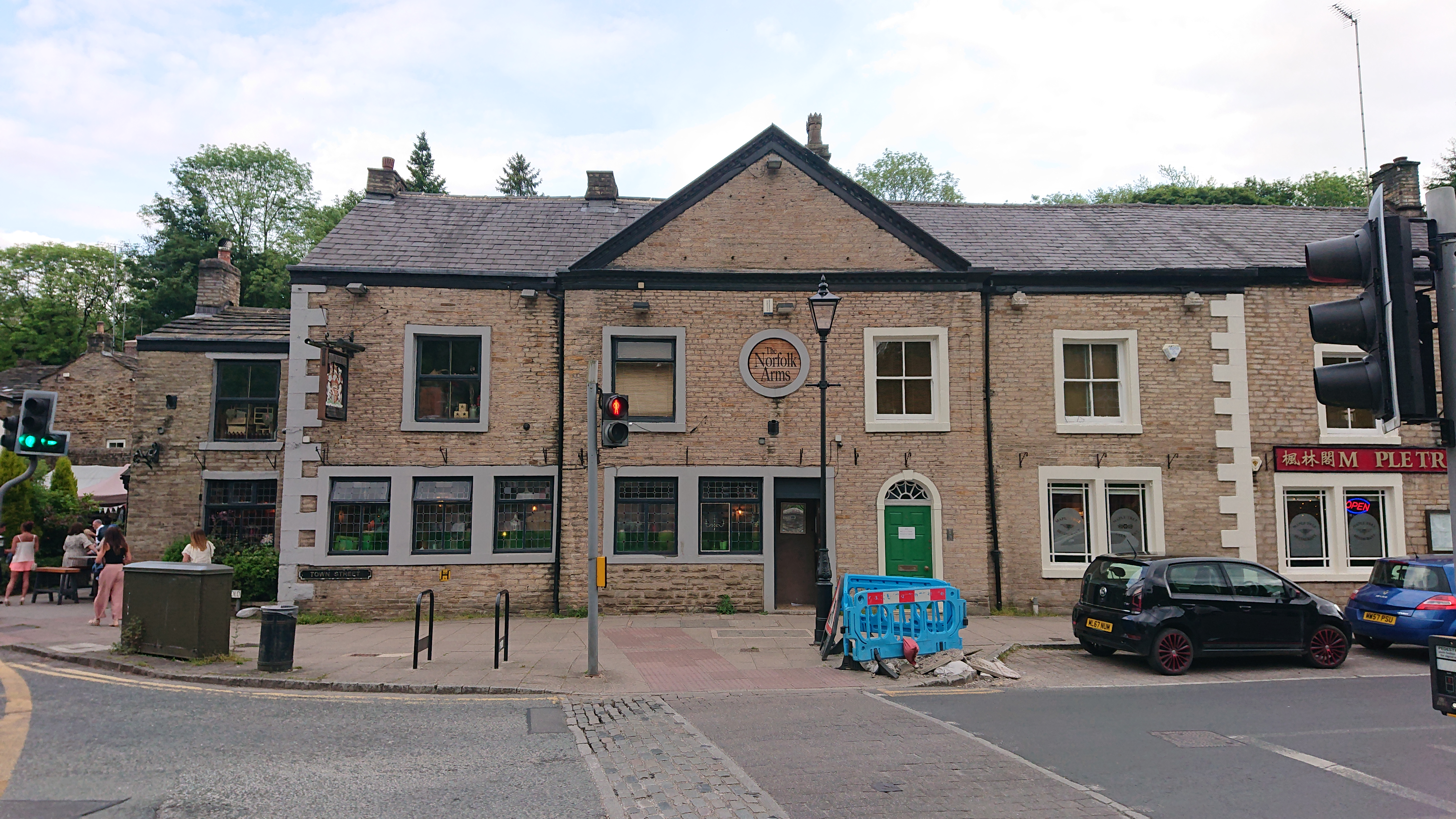
- The pub in 2021

- Location within Greater Manchester

General information
- Type: Public house with adjoining restaurant (formerly bank)
- Location: 2 Town Street, Marple Bridge, Greater Manchester, England
- Coordinates: 53.4017°N 2.0536°W
- Year built: Early 19th century

Design and construction
- Designations

Listed Building – Grade II
- Official name: Norfolk Arms and former National Westminster Bank
- Designated: 20 December 1967
- Reference no.: 1259997

Website
- thenorfolkarms.co.uk

The Norfolk Arms (officially listed as Norfolk Arms and former National Westminster Bank) is a Grade II listed public house on Town Street in Marple Bridge, a district of Marple within the Metropolitan Borough of Stockport, Greater Manchester, England. Dating from the early 19th century, it appears on late 19th and early 20th‑century Ordnance Survey maps as an unnamed pub. The building was listed in 1967 and included in the Marple Bridge conservation area in 1974. The adjoining former bank premises were already in restaurant use by 2012 and remain so. The pub stands facing Marple Bridge, the Grade II-listed bridge that gives the settlement its name.

== History ==
The building was constructed in the early 19th century, according to its official listing. (Note: Another source gives a construction date of 1792.) The 1898 and 1935 Ordnance Survey maps mark the building as a public house without attributing a name.

On 20 December 1967, the Norfolk Arms and National Westminster Bank was designated a Grade II listed building, and in 1974 the site was included within the newly designated Marple Bridge conservation area. The conservation area's character appraisal, published by Stockport Metropolitan Borough Council in 2012, noted that the adjoining former bank premises were already in restaurant use, and Google Street View imagery from 2023 shows that they continue to operate as one. The building's official listing received a minor amendment in 2017, changing the name from "Norfolk Arms and National Westminster Bank, Marple Bridge Branch" to "Norfolk Arms and former National Westminster Bank". In December 2016, it was reported that National Westminster Bank, commonly known as NatWest, was to close its branch in Marple; this notice did not relate to the former branch in Marple Bridge.

The Norfolk Arms stands facing Marple Bridge, the Grade II-listed bridge that gives the settlement its name.

== Architecture ==
The building is constructed of stone with a slate roof. It has six bays over two storeys, with additional sections to the left and at the rear. The front includes prominent corner stones, a decorative eaves line, and a pediment above bays two and three, which project slightly forward. Bays one and two have stone‑framed windows of three and two lights. Bay three contains two doorways, one likely added later and fitted with a fanlight. Bays four and five have two‑light windows, and bay six has another doorway. Each upper bay has a sash window, though bays one and two now have casements, all set within plain stone surrounds. A round panel sits beneath the pediment. There are four chimney stacks along the roof. Bays five and six, the left-hand wing, and a later 20th‑century rear extension were added after the main structure.

== See also ==
- Listed buildings in Marple, Greater Manchester
- Listed pubs in Greater Manchester
