= Surf (Roddy Frame album) =

Studio album by Roddy Frame
- Released: 5 August 2002
- Recorded: Home recorded Mixed at Funny Bunny Studios; Mastered at Abbey Road
- Genre: Acoustic
- Length: 35:42
- Label: Redemption
- Producer: Roddy Frame

Roddy Frame chronology
The North Star (1998)	Surf (2002)	Western Skies (2006)

Surf is the second solo album by the Scottish singer–songwriter Roddy Frame, first released in the UK on 5 August 2002 via Redemption Records, and in the US on 8 October 2002 via Cooking Vinyl. Surf is notable in that every song on the album was recorded in Roddy Frame's "own front room".

== Critical reception ==
Surf received generally positive reviews upon release. Burhan Wazir, writing for The Observer, likened the album to Steve Earle's Train a Comin', declaring it "wonderfully understated", and noting a distinct departure from Frame's previous material; "There are few signatures here that have come to mark the work of Roddy Frame, the Pride of East Kilbride, with his previous band Aztec Camera. That said, Surf is one of his best records since 1987's breakthrough, Love. It's a break-up album and the sparse acoustic songs lend Frame a maturity he previously struggled to express." Q magazine's Jon Horsley also noted the difference in sound between Surf and "all of Frame's previous work". Singling out "Over You" and "Mixed Up Love" as two of the album's best tracks, he went on to praise Frame's vocals, lyrics, and songwriting ability; "Simplicity is the key, displaying Frame's deft hand with a lyric and mastery of direct songwriting. Best of all is Frame's now beautifully mature voice." Noting the record's "bare-bones" sound, Gary Glauber of PopMatters thought that the album comprised "a pleasant voice, competent musicianship and most important, strong songs". Drawing comparison with Ron Sexsmith's "best compositions", he surmised that Frame manages to succeed "where lesser talents would fall."

Professional ratings
Review scores
Source	Rating
AllMusic	3.5/5 stars
PopMatters	Positive
Q	3/5 stars
The Guardian	3/5 stars
The Independent	Mixed
The Observer	Positive
The Scotsman	Positive

AllMusic's Matt Fink also remarked upon Surf's "undiluted format", highlighting Frame's "clever and consistent" songwriting ability as two of the album's most positive aspects. Yet, despite claiming that Frame's "knack for subtlety and nuance makes for near perfect acoustic balladry", he found fault with both the vocal delivery—which he described as "indistinctive and overwhelmingly mellow"—and the record's "lack of both sonic and conceptual variation". Reviewing the album for The Guardian, Adam Sweeting also bemoaned the album's lack of diversity in which he felt that "Frame tends to stick to a fairly narrow palette of musical shapes and chord patterns", but also declared there to be "some treats if sampled sparingly", most notably "Over You", "I Can't Start Now" and "Big Ben". The Independent' Andy Gill highlighted "Frame's slightly sour vocals"—which he described as having "a desolate purity that recalls the draft-dodging Seventies troubadour Jesse Winchester"—but ultimately found Surf to be "too personal to afford much pleasure to the casual listener".

=== Accolades ===
Publication	Country	Accolade	Year	Rank
Mojo	United Kingdom	Best 40 Albums of the Year	2002	20
The Scotsman	United Kingdom	100 Best Scottish Albums	—	34
Uncut	United Kingdom	Best Albums of the Year	2002	*

* denotes an unranked list.

== Album cover ==
The album cover shows a night-time skyline of London, in particular the tower of Guy's Hospital and is taken from the tower block Burwash House on Weston Street, London SE1 by photographer Hannah Grace Deller (Roddy's then girlfriend) inspired by the photo Nightview by Berenice Abbott made in 1932 in New York City. The photo was a memory from Hannah Grace Deller's childhood as she had lived in Burwash House and grew up in Bermondsey and was born in Guy's Hospital.

== Track listing ==
All tracks written by Roddy Frame.

1. "Over You" – 3:04
2. "Surf" – 4:14
3. "Small World" – 3:51
4. "I Can't Start Now" – 3:41
5. "Abloom" – 2:17
6. "Tough" – 2:17
7. "Big Ben" – 3:37
8. "High Class Music" – 3:09
9. "Turning the World Around" – 3:16
10. "Mixed Up Love" – 3:13
11. "For What It Was" – 3:03

Japanese Bonus Tracks

12. "Crossing Newbury Street" – 4:27
13. "Your Smile Stops the Hands of Time" – 2:32

== Personnel ==
- Roddy Frame – acoustic guitar, vocals

Technical personnel

- Hannah Grace Deller – recording, photography
- Jeremy Stacey – mixing
- Chris Blair – mastering
- Greg Jakobek – design

== Chart performance ==
Surf spent a total of two weeks in the UK Albums Chart, peaking at number 91 on 17 August 2002.

Chart (2002)	Peak position
UK Albums Chart	91
