= Marple Bridge =

District in Greater Manchester, England

Coordinates: 53.402°N 2.044°W

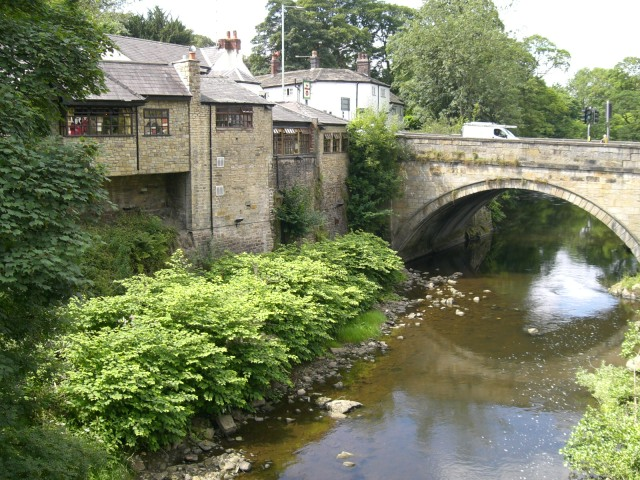
- Looking downstream to Marple Bridge over the Goyt

- Location within Greater Manchester
- OS grid reference: SJ971893
- Metropolitan borough: Stockport
- Metropolitan county: Greater Manchester
- Region: North West
- Country: England
- Sovereign state: United Kingdom
- Post town: STOCKPORT
- Postcode district: SK6
- Dialling code: 0161
- Police: Greater Manchester
- Fire: Greater Manchester
- Ambulance: North West
- UK Parliament: Hazel Grove

Marple Bridge is a district of Marple in the Metropolitan Borough of Stockport, Greater Manchester, England. The River Goyt runs through the centre of the village. Marple Bridge shares borders with Mellor, Marple, Compstall, New Mills, Strines, Mill Brow and Chisworth. It is in the ecclesiastical parish of Mellor; the parish church of St. Thomas stands several hundred feet higher than the village, overlooking Greater Manchester and Cheshire.

== History ==
Historically part of the civil parish of Glossop in Derbyshire, it was included in the new parish of Ludworth and Chisworth in 1866. Ludworth became a separate parish in 1896 and was abolished in 1936, when the former parish was transferred to Cheshire and amalgamated into Marple Urban District. In 1974, the urban district was abolished and Marple Bridge became part of the Metropolitan Borough of Stockport in the county of Greater Manchester.

== Transport ==
The village is served by Marple railway station on the Hope Valley Line. There are two services generally per hour in each direction: westbound trains reach Manchester Piccadilly; eastbound services alternate between New Mills Central and Sheffield. On Sundays, there is an hourly service between Manchester Piccadilly and Sheffield.

Local bus routes include:

- A Stockport circular route to Romiley and Bredbury (383 anticlockwise) and to Marple and Offerton (384 clockwise); this is operated by Stagecoach Manchester
- Diamond Bus North West operates the 385 route between Stockport and Mellor
- High Peak Buses runs the 394 service between Glossop, Hazel Grove and Stepping Hill Hospital.

== Conservation area ==
Marple Bridge village centre has been designated as a conservation area; it was established originally in 1974 and was extended in 2006 to incorporate Brabyns Park.

Stockport Metropolitan Borough Council has produced a Conservation Area Character Appraisal document, outlining the reasons that the conservation area has been designated as such; in justifying this, the document states of the town: “Marple Bridge is a predominantly stone-built village situated on the banks of the River Goyt, just to the north-east of Marple... Historically the location had significance as a bridging point on the route between Stockport and Derbyshire and where water power was available initially for a forge and corn mill. Marple Bridge developed from the 18th century as a small urban centre. Of special importance is the landscape setting of Marple Bridge formed by the steep-sided valley of the [River] Goyt...”

The bridge itself was built in the 19th century and was widened in the 1930s; it is a Grade II listed building.

== Education ==
Marple Bridge has two schools: Ludworth Primary School and St Mary's Catholic Voluntary Academy.

== Amenities ==
Marple Bridge has various amenities. It has three pubs, the Norfolk Arms, the Royal Scot, and the Midland. The village also has a Chinese restaurant, chip shop, café, deli, and a bistro. There is also a post office, which sells food and drink, a pharmacy, a hairdressers, two barbers shops, and two estate agents. There is also a clothing shop, and two churches.

== Notable people ==
- Pete Mitchell, radio presenter, lived in Marple Bridge.
- Johnny Marr, musician, guitarist in the Smiths and the Cribs, among others, lived in Marple Bridge in 1983.
- Roddy Frame, Scottish musician and lead singer of Aztec Camera, lived in a wooden shack in Marple Bridge between 1984 and 1987.
- Band Delphic are residents of Marple Bridge.
- Andy Votel, musician and DJ, grew up in Marple Bridge.
- Matilda Simon, 3rd Baroness Simon of Wythenshawe, lived in Marple Bridge.

== See also ==
- Listed buildings in Marple, Greater Manchester
