= The North Star (Roddy Frame album) =

Studio album by Roddy Frame
- Released: 21 September 1998
- Studio: Mayfair, London; Metropolis, London
- Length: 37:32
- Label: Independiente
- Producer: Roddy Frame; Simon Dawson

Roddy Frame chronology
The North Star (1998)	Surf (2002)

Singles from The North Star
- 1. "Reason for Living" Released: September 1998

The North Star is the debut album by Scottish singer-songwriter Roddy Frame, released in September 1998 by Independiente. It features the single "Reason for Living", which peaked at number 45 on the UK Singles Chart.

== Background ==
Aztec Camera released their sixth studio album Frestonia in November 1995, marking the end of their contract with WEA. It became the band's least commercially successful release; frontman Roddy Frame opted to go solo and signed with Go! Discs. After a year of no activity, the label had been purchased by PolyGram, and its label head Andy McDonald formed a new label, Independiente. Frame subsequently transferred over to his new home.

== Critical reception ==
Professional ratings
Review scores
Source	Rating
AllMusic	4/5 stars

The Guardian wrote that Frame has "painted an autumnal landscape of ballads and guitar rockers (if rockers is the right word for these scaled-down little bruschettas of songs) whose attention to detail could be mistaken for blandness."

== Track listing ==
All tracks are written by Roddy Frame

No.	Title	Length
1.	"Back to the One"	4:01
2.	"The North Star"	4:04
3.	"Here Comes the Ocean"	3:23
4.	"River of Brightness"	4:22
5.	"Strings"	4:10
6.	"Bigger Brighter Better"	3:27
7.	"Autumn Flower"	4:17
8.	"Reason for Living"	3:16
9.	"Sister Shadow"	3:38
10.	"Hymn to Grace"	2:54

== Personnel ==
- Roddy Frame – vocals, guitar, bass, mandolin
- Andy Claine – backing vocals
- Yolanda Charles – bass
- Claire Kenny – bass
- Jeremy Stacey – drums
- Mark Edwards – keyboards, piano, organ
- Luis Jardim – percussion
- Barriemore Barlow – percussion

Technical

- Simon Dawson – engineer, record producer
- Matt Lawrence – assistant engineer
- Gerard Navarro – assistant engineer
- Jon Kelly – mixer
- Andy Green – assistant mixer
- Ellen Nolan – photography

== Chart performance ==
The North Star spent a total of two weeks in the UK Albums Chart, peaking at number 55 on 3 October 1998.

Chart (1998)	Peak position
UK Albums Chart	55
