= Lost in Space (Jonzun Crew album) =

Studio album by Jonzun Crew
- Released: April 26, 1983
- Studios: Unique Recording; Boston International Recorders
- Genre: Synth-Funk
- Length: 36:22
- Label: Tommy Boy
- Producer: Michael Jonzun

Jonzun Crew chronology
Lost in Space (1983)	Down to Earth (1984)

Lost in Space is the debut album by the Jonzun Crew. It was released by Tommy Boy Records, and was the label’s first full-length release. It was recorded in Boston at Boston International Recorders with some additional recording done at Unique Recording in New York.

On its release, some music critics complimented the music's groove and danceability while others found it lacking the power of the group's original singles.

== Production ==
Maurice Starr and his brother Michael Jonzun worked together on music, developing tracks such as "Pac-Man," which received local radio play. After releasing "Pac Man" on his own label, Boston International Records, Jonzun was contacted by Tommy Boy Records as the group’s own label did not really have international distribution. "Pac Man" was later re-made as "Pack Jam".

The album was recorded at Unique Recording in New York and Boston International Recorders in Boston. Some tracks had added material in New York, such as the laughter and other small elements on "We Are the Jonzun Crew" were added in New York, which Michael Jonzun described as being "upgraded and mixed" in New York. The song "Pack Jam" was remixed by John "Jellybean" Benitez.

== Music ==
The music on Lost in Space was described as electro-funk. The music on the album is dance-oriented with synthesized vocals. Jonzun did not feel that they were a hip-hop group, feeling they were labeled as a hip-hop group because of the word "crew" in the group’s name, which he stated he called them that as a "flight crew"-sounding kind of name.

== Release ==
Lost in Space was released in 1983 on Tommy Boy Records. The album was the first full-length album by Tommy Boy, which previously had only released singles. Lost In Space peaked on The Billboard 200 at number 66.

A music video was made for their song "Space Cowboy" that was shot along New York's West Side Highway and the Hudson River by British director Michael Hoppen.

Tom Silverman of Tommy Boy stated that "We're continually changing [...] We could keep making "Planet Rock" [...] But we're really not interested in that. We want to accelerate the evolution of popular music." In a 1984 interview, the Vice President of Tommy Boy, Monica Lynch, stated that there was no way Tommy Boy could Just "put out rap and electro-funk records alone", leading to Michael Jonzun's next album having more of an orientation toward love songs and ballads than the electro-based debut.

To celebrate 20 years in the business, Tommy Boy Records re-released Lost in Space on January 16, 2001, including its debut on the compact disc format. The 2001 release added a remix of "Pack Jam (Look Out for the OVC)" by Grooverider.

== Reception ==
Professional ratings
Review scores
Source	Rating
AllMusic	3/5 stars
The Baltimore Sun	3/5 stars
The Columbian	2/4 stars
Omaha World-Herald	4/5 stars
The Philadelphia Inquirer	4/5 stars
The Village Voice	C+

From contemporary reviews, Fred Seegmuller referred to the album as "six lengthy dance-oriented tracks" noting "We Are the Jonzun Crew", "Space is the Place", "Space Cowboy" and "Pack Jam" as highlights. J. D. Considine wrote in The Baltimore Sun found that "for all their ability to get the most mileage from a handful of musical tricks, the Jonzun Crew "still manages to wear thin after a while." and that "there's no sense of discovery here beyond the idea that made "Pack Jam" a smash." Robert Christgau wrote in the Village Voice praised "Space Cowboy" but stated that the record as a whole was too silly.

Ken Tucker of The Philadelphia Inquirer praised the album, stating that "Pack Jam" is the most arresting cut on the group's album and found that the album "demonstrates decisively that synthesizer music doesn't have to be chilly, distancing stuff. Jonzun's music ripples with humor and ingratiating energy." Roger Catlin of Omaha World-Herald found that the album was "just short of a having a full record's worth of ideas. With this kind of beat, though, few will notice."

From retrospective reviews, John Bush of AllMusic says that despite the album including the group's best tracks, it was not a successful studio album, stating that group were "lousy songwriters" who "insisted on writing songs" finding the non-singles as "stiff" and "formulaic".

== Track listing ==
Track listing and credits are adapted from the back cover of Lost in Space.

=== Side A ===
1. "We Are The Jonzun Crew" (Michael Jonzun, Maurice Starr) - 6:23
2. "Space is the Place" (Jonzun) - 6:27
3. "Electro Boogie Encounter" (Jonzun) - 6:49

=== Side B ===
1. "Ground Control" (Jonzun, Starr) - 5:40
2. "Space Cowboy" (Jonzun) - 5:36
3. "Pack Jam (Remix)" (Jonzun, Starr) - 5:09

== Credits ==
Credits are adapted from the sleeve and vinyl sticker of Lost in Space.

- Thomas Silverman - executive producer, co-producer
- Michael Jonzun - producer, engineer, lead vocals, computer programming, electro drums, space bass, space vocals, sound effects, synthesized keyboards, background vocals, string and brass synthesizers
- Maurice Starr - co-producer, pre-production engineer
- Steve "Stevo" Thorpe - electro drumming, syncussion, background vocals
- Frank Heller - engineer
- Oscar Gerardo - pre-production engineer
- Soni Jonzun - pre-production engineer, string synthesizers, sound effects, background vocals
- Sidney Burton - pre-production engineer
- Fred Torchio - pre-production engineer
- Jimmy Mace - pre-production engineer
- Jose "Animal" Diaz - mixing on "We Are the Jonzun Crew"
- John "Jellybean" Benitez - mixing on "Space is the Place" and "Pack Jam"
- Rapahel DeJesus - Latin percussion (on "We Are the Jonzun Crew", "Electro Boogie Encounter")
- Ken Goldbeck - additional arrangements on "Space Cowboy"
- Gordon Worthy - additional arrangements on "Space Cowboy", brass synthesizers, space-bass, electro drums, background vocals
- Geoffrey Chandler - cover art
- Herb Powers Jr. - mastering
