= Brabyns Park =

Park in Greater Manchester, England

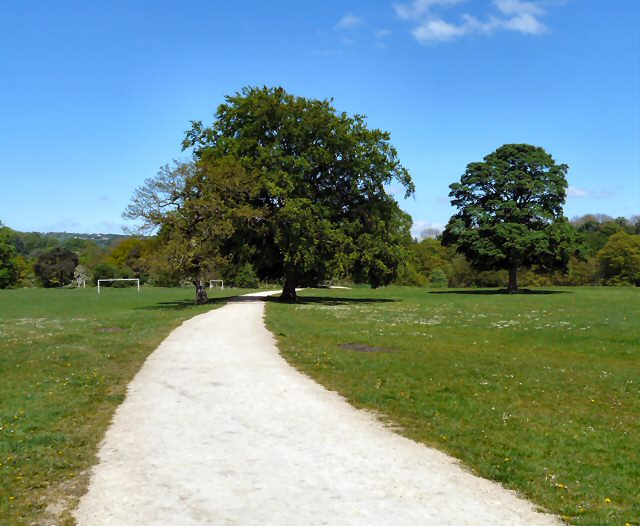
- Brabyns Park
- Interactive map of Brabyns Park
- Type: Park
- Coordinates: 53.406°N 2.058°W
- Operator: Stockport Borough Council
- Open: All year

Brabyns Park is a public park in Marple Bridge, Stockport, Greater Manchester, England.

== History ==
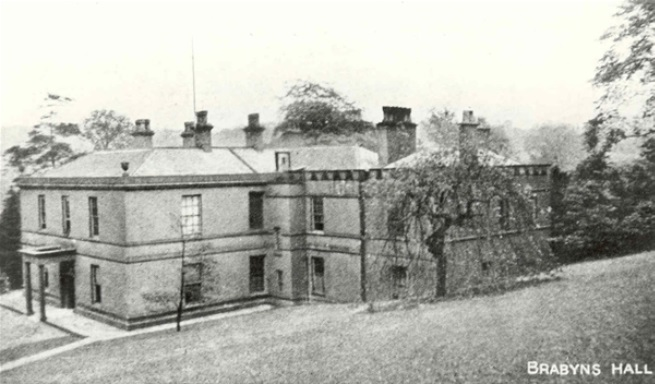
Brabyns Hall as a military hospital c. 1918; it was demolished in 1953

Brabyns Park was formerly the grounds of Brabyns Hall, a mansion house. The estate was originally owned by the Lowe family of Lower Marple. Elizabeth Brabin owned the estate in 1749 and, with her husband Henry, built the Georgian Brabyns Hall and began the landscaping of the grounds. The house faced down the valley to take advantage of the views and lodges controlled access into the park.

In 1800, the estate was purchased by Nathaniel Wright and, in 1811, the house was extended with a lake added and chestnuts, poplars and cypress trees planted. Ann Hudson inherited the estate in 1866 and it continued in the female line until Fanny Hudson died in 1941.

The estate was subsequently purchased by Cheshire County Council and was opened for public recreation. The hall was demolished in 1953 and, subsequently, the farmhouse in the 1970s.

== Landmarks ==
The park is part of the Marple conservation area, due to its historic planned landscape. The iron bridge at the park is Grade II listed with Historic England. It is one of the few remaining iron bridges from the early 1800s and was awarded a Heritage Lottery Fund grant in 2007 to assist with its restoration.

The weir over the River Goyt in the park is Grade II listed with Historic England, as is the lodge at the entrance to the park which is owned privately.

== Facilities ==
The park has the following facilities: parkland, woodland, playing fields, football pitches, a children's play area, a pond, picnic areas, horse riding and car parking. The Peak Forest Canal and the River Goyt pass through the park.

Marple Parkrun takes place in the park every Saturday morning.
