= Love (Aztec Camera album) =

Studio album by Aztec Camera
- Released: 9 November 1987
- Recorded: 1986, April–August 1987
- Genres: Sophisti-pop; dance-pop; R&B; synth-pop; Philly soul
- Length: 38:37
- Labels: WEA, Sire
- Producers: Russ Titelman; Tommy LiPuma; David Frank; Roddy Frame; Michael Jonzun; Rob Mounsey

Aztec Camera chronology
Knife (1984)	Love (1987)	Stray (1990)

Singles from Love
- 1. "Deep & Wide & Tall" Released: October 1987; 2. "How Men Are" Released: January 1988; 3. "Somewhere in My Heart" Released: April 1988; 4. "Working in a Goldmine" Released: July 1988

Love is the third studio album by Scottish pop group Aztec Camera, released in November 1987 on Sire. While it was released under the Aztec Camera name, Roddy Frame was the only remaining permanent member of the group and he recorded the album alongside a group of session musicians. Departing from the indie and folk-rock approach of earlier records, Love incorporated R&B influences, seemingly to break the American market. It failed to do so but did achieve commercial success in the UK, reaching No. 10 on the albums chart, following the success of its third single "Somewhere in My Heart", which reached No. 3 on the UK Singles Chart. As a result, it became the band's most commercially successful album.

== Background and Writing ==
After the band's previous album 'Knife', the band went through a line-up shift, losing founding bassist Campbell Owens, however retaining drummer David Ruffy, and adding guitarist Steve Jordan, bassist Marcus Miller and keyboardist David Frank of the System. However, Roddy would later state that 'the sessions for the album marked the first time, that he made up his mind to "willfully experiment with lots of different people" including drumming legend Steve Gadd and Miles Davis collaborator Marcus Miller.'

Roddy felt that he was 'unsure' of what direction to take after Knife's under-performance compared to the success of High Land, Hard Rain and felt he was 'lucky' to get out of the 3 year period following Knife:

Basically, I made a second album that didn’t do that great. And how did I react to that? I spent three years sitting around smoking dope and listening to soul music thinking, ‘I’m not going to write any songs this week — I’m not feeling it. Then, ‘Let’s go to the record company and get some more money. We seem to be running out.’ So off my manager goes to the label, and they’re like, ‘Can we hear anything? It’s been a couple of years.’ And we’re going, ‘Not quite yet. Have you got any money?’ Looking back at that period, I think, ‘Jesus, I was lucky to get away with that.’

Roddy talked about his time in New York, recording Love, as "spending a lot of time listening to WBLS, and playing keyboards and programming machines". He elaborated on his influences around this time period, calling the album his 'Young Americans' due to its 'White-Soul' nature :

I went to America and wanted to make a Jimmy Jam and Terry Lewis kinda record. I was listening to ‘Sugar Free’ by Juicy, Anita Baker and ‘Tender Love’ by the Force MDs. Green from Scritti Politti had just been to America and I wanted to marry that New York R&B electro thing with my kind of lyrics and style and that British thing.

He went onto reveal that the album's hit single, which earned Aztec Camera's biggest hit, 'Somewhere in My Heart' almost didn't make the cut:

When it came to putting Love together I tried everything to keep it off the album. [...] We had nine tracks plus ‘Somewhere In My Heart’. We made that with the Jonzun Crew up in Boston. I thought its a brilliant song but it doesn’t fit on the record. I was trying to write a new song but time was running out. Eventually we just had to stick it on the end. [...] It was my biggest hit but it was the runt of the litter. That’s been the song that’s survived. My little baby, the orphan that no one wanted!

Lyrically, the album is more direct and draws less from poetry but maintains the introspective element of previous albums such as on 'How Men Are', which Roddy described as: "I'm not sure about opening myself up like this, but I'm trying to look inside and find out why men are so screwed up." . He also went on to say:

All the women around me were always saying things like, 'all the bad things that have happened to me have been because of men' .. Women are denied chances and abused by men all the time. It's so obvious what inspired me to write it, you can see these things around you all the time. It seems to me sometimes that if you want to get on in business or whatever that it's quite important to have a dick and if you haven't got one you've got to try a lot harder.

On the whole however, Roddy mentioned that he consciously worked on making his lyrics less ambiguous:

I deliberately wanted to make some statements on this record, and you can understand 60 to 70% of them, which for an Aztec Camera album is pretty incredible! It was deliberate. I wanted to avoid that confusion. It was a challenge because I ended up putting poetry type stuff into the bin because, as a good songwriter, you should be able to articulate what you feel. With 'High Land, Hard Rain', a lot of my writing was up in the air.

== Reception ==
Professional ratings
Review scores
Source	Rating
AllMusic	2.5/5 stars
Alternative Rock	5/10
Christgau's Record Guide	A−
New Musical Express	9/10
Record Mirror	3/5 stars

The album was released to mixed reception from critics and fans alike, some who didn't take to the new R&B and Soul-Funk direction of the new music, as Ron Rom of Sounds Magazine put it:

There's no denying that the cream of New York's dance musicians like The Jonzun Crew have added a professional texture to Roddy's condensed and vastly simplified lyrics. But at the same time they have extracted some of the unblemished, warming purity that was one of Aztec Camera's best qualities in the past...

Author Dave Thompson wrote in his book Alternative Rock (2000) that the album was a "backward step into pop cliché, an attempt to make a record which would work on American radio."

Upon release, the initially peaked at number 49 on the UK Albums Chart. After the success of its singles (in particular "Somewhere in My Heart") it rose to number 10.

Among the band's audience there were some who felt the band had 'sold out' with Love, particularly in Japan, where an interviewer mentioned this to Roddy in 1990 while promoting Stray, and that the band's audience in Japan depleted after Love. To this, Roddy responded:

I think what happened is that on the 3rd album, I went on this program and we talked about Luther Vandross.. maybe some people saw that as being too commercial, but they didn't understand that's exactly what I wanted to do, to make that kind of album. So if that's the case, that's probably why. [...] If people don't like your records then they just shouldn't buy them! I don't really expect people to like everything that I'm doing.

== Track listing ==
All songs written by Roddy Frame.

Side one
No.	Title	Producer	Length
1.	"Deep & Wide & Tall"	Russ Titelman	4:02
2.	"How Men Are"	Tommy LiPuma; David Frank	3:38
3.	"Everybody Is a Number One"	Titelman	3:25
4.	"More Than a Law"	Frame	4:39
5.	"Somewhere in My Heart"	Michael Jonzun	4:00

Side two
No.	Title	Producer	Length
6.	"Working in a Goldmine"	Rob Mounsey; Frame	5:36
7.	"One and One"	Mounsey; Frame	4:10
8.	"Paradise"	LiPuma; Frank	4:29
9.	"Killermont Street"	Mounsey; Frame	3:16

== Personnel ==
Personnel per booklet.

Musicians

- Roddy Frame – vocals, guitars, background vocals (track 1 and 3)
- Rob Mounsey – bass (track 1), keyboard programming (tracks 1 and 7), keyboards (tracks 3, 6 and 9), programming (tracks 6 and 9), drums (track 7)
- Jimmy Bralower – drum programming (tracks 1, 3 and 4)
- Carol Steele – percussion (tracks 1, 6 and 7)
- Dave Weckl – drums (tracks 1–3)
- Tawatha Agee – background vocals (tracks 1 and 3)
- Jill Dellabates – background vocals (tracks 1 and 3)
- Lani Groves – background vocals (tracks 1, 2 and 6–8)
- Dan Hartman – background vocals (tracks 1 and 3)
- David Frank – keyboards (tracks 2 and 8), programming (tracks 2 and 8)
- Marcus Miller – bass guitar (tracks 2 and 8)
- Robin Clark – background vocals (tracks 2 and 6–8)
- Gordon Grody – background vocals (tracks 2 and 6–8)
- Peter Beckett – keyboards (track 3)
- Robby Kilgore – bass synthesizer (track 3)
- Jeff Bova – bass guitar (track 4), keyboard programming (track 4)
- Scott Parker – background vocals (track 4)
- Michael Jonzun – drums (track 5), keyboard programming (track 5), background vocals (track 5)
- Kent Wagner – bass guitar (track 5)
- Soni Jonzun – saxophone (track 5)
- Gloria Jonzun – background vocals (track 5)
- Steve Jordan – drums (tracks 6 and 9)
- Will Lee – bass guitar (tracks 6 and 9)
- Carroll Thompson – lead vocals (track 7)
- Steve Gadd – drums (track 8)

Production and artwork

- Russ Titelman – producer (tracks 1 and 3)
- Josh Abbey – engineer (tracks 1, 3 and 4)
- Tommy LiPuma – producer (tracks 2 and 8)
- David Frank – producer (tracks 2 and 8)
- Eric Calvi – engineer (tracks 2, 3 and 8)
- Roddy Frame – producer (tracks 4, 6, 7 and 9)
- Michael Jonzun – producer (track 5)
- Sidney H. Burton Jr. – engineer (track 5)
- Nigel Walker – engineer (track 5)
- Rob Mounsey – producer (tracks 6, 7 and 9)
- Richard Alderson – engineer (track 6, 7 and 9)
- Kevin Halpin – engineer (track 6, 7 and 9)
- Jim Groatley – assistant engineer
- Richard Novak – assistant engineer
- Barbara Milne – assistant engineer
- Matt Hathaway – assistant engineer
- Angela Piva – assistant engineer
- Jeff Cox – assistant engineer
- Joel Martin – assistant engineer
- Arun Chakraverty – mastering
- Nick Knight – photography
- The Control Room – artwork, additional design
- Peter Saville Associates – original material

== Singles ==
- "How Men Are" (UK No. 25)
- "Somewhere in My Heart" (UK No. 3)
- "Working in a Goldmine" (UK No. 31)
- "Deep & Wide & Tall" (UK No. 55)
