= Western Skies =

Studio album by Roddy Frame
- Released: 1 May 2006
- Genre: Rock
- Label: Redemption
- Producer: Roddy Frame, Jeremy Stacey

Roddy Frame chronology
Surf (2002)	Western Skies (2006)	Seven Dials (2014)

Western Skies is Roddy Frame's third solo album. It was released on 1 May 2006 on Redemption Records.

== Track listing ==
All tracks composed by Roddy Frame; except where indicated

1. "Western Skies" (Frame, Dan Carey, Robert Gorham)
2. "The Coast"
3. "Marble Arch"
4. "She Wolf"
5. "Tell the Truth"
6. "Rock God"
7. "Day of Reckoning"
8. "Shore Song"
9. "Dry Land"
10. "Worlds in Worlds"
11. "Portastudio"

== Personnel ==
- Roddy Frame - vocals, guitar; bass on "Days of Reckoning" and "Worlds in Worlds"
- Mark Neary - double bass
- Jeremy Stacey - drums, percussion, marxophone, melodica, celesta
- Mark Smith - bass on "Portastudio"
