= Avi Buffalo =

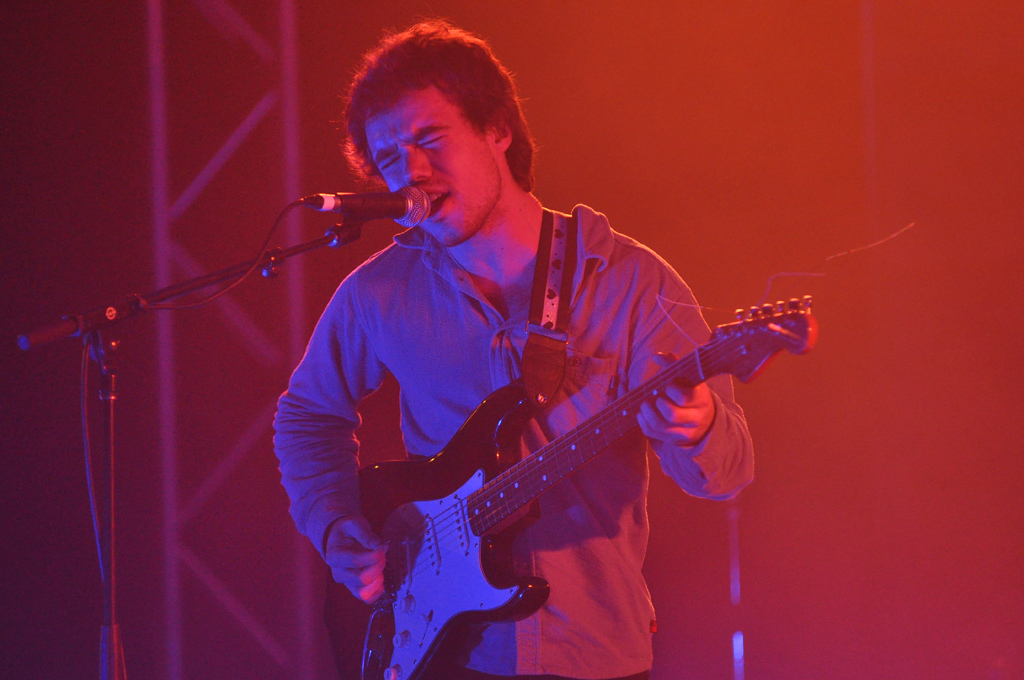
- Avi Buffalo performing at All Tomorrow's Parties New York in 2010

Background information
- Born: Avigdor Benyamin Zahner-Isenberg
- Origin: Long Beach, California
- Genre: Indie
- Occupation: Musician
- Instruments: Guitar, Piano, Voice
- Years active: 2006-Present
- Label: Sub Pop

Avigdor Benyamin Zahner-Isenberg, known as Avi Buffalo, is an American musician, songwriter, and producer.

== Career ==
Avi Buffalo's self-titled debut album was released on April 27, 2010, and was given positive reviews by The A.V. Club, NME, Filter, Drowned in Sound and numerous other music review sites. The album's first single was "What's In It For" with "Jessica" on the B-side. His band performed at SXSW the same year, and opened for Modest Mouse in July. In 2010, the band toured Europe and North America. In June 2011 a second single was released on Sub Pop, "How Come? and Good I'm Wishing", and he had already begun writing for a second album.

Avi began recording a follow-up to his self-titled album in 2012, and in 2013 began producing other artists and side projects in addition to his own material. Avi Buffalo's second album At Best Cuckold was released on 8 September 2014 in Europe, and on 9 September in the US. Avi and a live band toured the US and Europe in support of this album in Autumn of 2014 for a brief amount of time before Avi decided to return to performing, writing and producing new music.

In 2015, he said he was putting an end to the band Avi Buffalo. In 2019, he released the electronic album Glow Cast on Eternal Sound with Ari Prado.

On July 27, 2020, Avi Buffalo was accused of raping a former bandmate. In response to the accusations, Sub Pop stopped selling his albums from stores and digital services.

== Discography ==
=== Albums ===
- 2007: Avi Buffalo - Home Recording era begins and varying CD-R bootlegs circulated by Avi Buffalo
- 2010: Avi Buffalo - Avi Buffalo (Sub Pop Records)
- 2014: Avi Buffalo - At Best Cuckold (Sub Pop Records)
- 2019: Ari Prado & Avi Buffalo - Glow Cast on Eternal Sound (Ari Prado Music)

=== EPs and singles ===
- 2010: "What's In It For/Jessica" (7" release)
- 2011: "How Come/Good I'm Wishing" (7" release)
- 2018: "Panegyric"
- 2019: "Skeleton Painting"

=== Other credits ===
- 2010: Sevendys - Guitarist
- 2015: Bobby Rae - The Now and Then Clubhouse (as producer, mixer and masterer)
- 2015: Litronix - Pump The Gas (as producer, engineer and musician)
