= Frestonia (album) =

Studio album by Aztec Camera
- Released: 6 November 1995
- Recorded: April–August 1995
- Length: 48:33
- Label: Reprise
- Producers: Clive Langer, Alan Winstanley

Aztec Camera chronology
Dreamland (1993)	Frestonia (1995)	The Best of Aztec Camera (1999)

Frestonia is the sixth and final studio album by the Scottish band Aztec Camera, released in 1995. Roddy Frame's subsequent releases would be under his own name. The title of the album refers to the community of Frestonia, in the Notting Hill district of London.

Frestonia was the lowest-charting Aztec Camera album in the United Kingdom, reaching No. 100 and at number 187 on the Australian ARIA Charts.

== Critical reception ==
Professional ratings
Review scores
Source	Rating
AllMusic	3/5 stars
Alternative Rock	7/10
Robert Christgau	(dud)
New Straits Times	3/5 stars
Martin C. Strong	5/10
The Virgin Encyclopedia of Eighties Music	3/5 stars
Wall of Sound	80/100

The Independent determined that "apart from one or two highlights ... it's pretty dull fare, with desultory, predictable arrangements doing their best to avoid trampling over the lyrics." The Record deemed the album "a repulsive bit of narcissism that can't even make a claim for tragic portent; instead, it just sounds like the work of a poser." Author Dave Thompson wrote in his book Alternative Rock that Frame comes across as "bruised, battered, and a bit disillusioned by time, but he's still a hopeless romantic at heart." He added that the album "perfectly captures that state as the vividly emotional lyrics and delivery take centrestage and the evocative melodies complete the perfect tableaus."

In 2021, Pitchfork wrote: "Less musically adventurous than its predecessor, Aztec’s 1995 album Frestonia is strongest in its softest moments, trading the sonic ambition of Dreamland for a classic approach to solo songwriting."

== Track listing ==
All tracks written by Roddy Frame.

1. "Rainy Season" 5:41
2. "Sun" 4:28
3. "Crazy" 5:19
4. "On the Avenue" 3:43
5. "Imperfectly" 4:22
6. "Debutante" 7:10
7. "Beautiful Girl" 4:50
8. "Phenomenal World" 4:09
9. "Method of Love" 4:23
10. "Sunset" 4:21

== Personnel ==
- Roddy Frame – guitar, vocals
- Yolanda Charles – bass, background vocals
- Mark Edwards – keyboards
- Jeremy Stacey – drums
- Luís Jardim – percussion
- Claudia Fontaine – background vocals
- Audrey Riley, Chris Tombling, Leo Payne, Sue Dench – strings

== See also ==
- The North Star – Frame's next release after the end of Aztec Camera
