= Duncanrig Secondary School =

Coordinates: 55.758705°N 4.204229°W

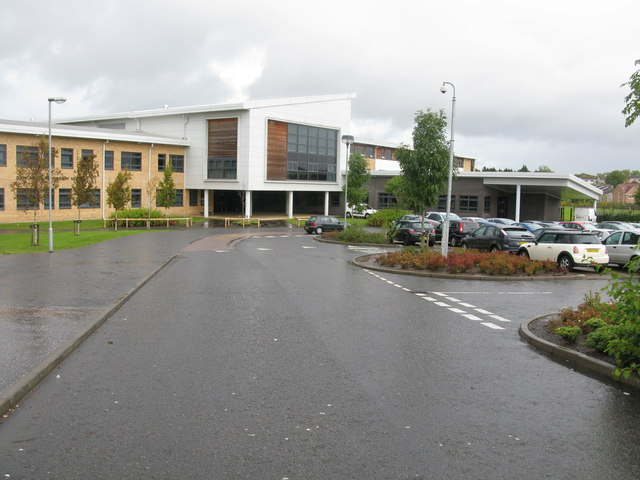
- Duncanrig Secondary School in 2013

Location
- Winnipeg Drive; Westwood; East Kilbride, South Lanarkshire, G75 8ZT; Scotland

Information
- School type: Public
- Motto: Together We Are Duncanrig
- Established: 1960
- Head teacher: Annette Alexander
- Age: 12 to 18
- Enrollment: 1768 (August 2023)
- Language: English
- Campus: Main building with outside football, hockey & rugby fields
- Houses: Avondale, Blantyre, Cathkin and Drumclog
- Colours: Black, grey and Light Blue
- Accreditation: Scottish Qualification Authority
- Website: Official website

Duncanrig Secondary School is a secondary school within the town of East Kilbride in the South Lanarkshire council area in Scotland. The original building was designed in 1953 by the Scottish architect Basil Spence.

== History ==
Spence is perhaps better known for his design of Coventry Cathedral, the "Beehive" building in New Zealand, or the British Embassy in Rome amongst many others. Although Spence was to design in the modern Brutalist mould, the school he designed at East Kilbride was playful and theatrical.

A feature of the school building was a large mural by William Crosbie representing the history of the Clyde. This was located at the main entrance, visible through a floor to roof line, two storey glass wall. Crosbie's paintings hang in all the major museums and galleries in Scotland as well as the Royal Collection and the British Museum in London, and in private collections throughout the United Kingdom and abroad.

The building was demolished in 2007. A new school was built on the original playing fields, replacing the original building as part of South Lanarkshire's Schools modernization programme. It officially opened in 2008. The new building was designed to be available to the community, incorporating indoor and outdoor sports facilities including a floodlit all-weather synthetic pitch, the home of the Friday Football Project.

The modernisation programme included the merger of Duncanrig Secondary School with Ballerup High School, retaining the name Duncanrig Secondary School, which was temporarily housed in the existing building until the new school was built. The four other mainstream secondary schools in East Kilbride at that time also went through a process of mergers.

Duncanrig holds an annual concert, Rig Rock, which is a multi-band based 'Battle of the Bands'.

Previous headteacher George Wynne retired on 22 December 2017 and was replaced by Lynsday McRoberts on 14 February 2018; for the duration of time between these dates Anna Widdowson was acting Headteacher.

== Transport to school ==
Most pupils walk to and from school or get their parents to drive them to school. Communication Support Base Pupils are given free taxi rides, offered and funded by South Lanarkshire Council.

Transport buses operate for free to and from the school. Pupils who live three miles or more away from the school are allowed to be transported to and from school on the buses.

Public transport buses from First Glasgow operate in the area: services 6, 18A, 201, and M1.

== Notable alumni ==
=== Pupils ===
- Lisa Cameron — clinical psychologist and Conservative Party MP for East Kilbride, Strathaven and Lesmahagow since 2015 (SNP until October 2023)
- Cammy Ballantyne — football player currently playing for Airdrieonians F.C. and formerly of Dumbarton Dundee United and Montrose
- Roddy Frame — singer-songwriter and musician
