= Good Morning Britain (song) =

Single by Aztec Camera and Mick Jones

from the album Stray
- Released: October 1990
- Recorded: London, England
- Length: 4:02
- Label: WEA
- Songwriter: Roddy Frame

Aztec Camera and Mick Jones singles chronology
"The Crying Scene" (1990)	"Good Morning Britain" (1990)	"Spanish Horses" (1992)

"Good Morning Britain" is a song by Scottish band Aztec Camera featuring special guest Mick Jones (of Big Audio Dynamite and the Clash). It was released as the second single from their 1990 studio album Stray. The song was written by Aztec Camera frontman Roddy Frame. It reached number 19 on the UK Singles Chart, and number 12 on the U.S. Alternative Songs chart.

== Background and release ==
"Good Morning Britain" was released as the second single from the band's fourth studio album Stray (1990), released in October 1990. Fourteen various versions of the song were released ranging from CD promos, radio edits, vinyl singles and cassette tapes. "Good Morning Britain" was released in Europe by WEA Records and in the United States by Sire Records and Reprise Records.

== Recording ==
Aztec Camera teamed up with the Clash guitarist Mick Jones for the recording of "Good Morning Britain". In an interview, lead singer Roddy Frame said that by the time "Good Morning Britain" was released, the acid house genre movement had swept Britain, leading to the release charting at number 19 in the United Kingdom, somewhat of a disappointment for the band.

Frame said that he wrote "Good Morning Britain" with Mick Jones within 45 minutes following a "two to three hour conversation" with Jones in the canteen of a London recording studio. Frame stated that when he had approached Jones to record the track with the band, he told Jones "you will either want to sing on it, or sue me", as Frame believed that "Good Morning Britain" was very similar in sound to some of Jones' previous work.

== Lyrics ==
The song is a protest song, listing in its first four verses problems and marginalisation affecting Scotland, Northern Ireland, Wales and England, before ending with the hopeful message that standing up to injustice will make the country a better place.

Two contemporary politicians are referenced in the lyrics, with "ten long years and we've still got her" referring to Margaret Thatcher, and the verse about Wales mentioning Neil Kinnock.

== Music video ==
Mick Jones and Roddy Frame in the music video for "Good Morning Britain" with an image of Margaret Thatcher in the background

The music video for "Good Morning Britain" was shot in the style of a television breakfast programme (presumably Good Morning Britain), with the band and Mick Jones singing the song in front of a large screen featuring various images representing England, Scotland, Wales and Northern Ireland. A clock, common on British breakfast shows, and similar to that which was featured on Good Morning Britain television broadcasts, is seen moving backwards at the bottom right of the music video. The clock on Good Morning Britain television broadcasts is white, whereas in the music video for "Good Morning Britain", the clock is yellow.

The video shows significant aspects and people from the history of the United Kingdom both prior to and up to the release of "Good Morning Britain". Margaret Thatcher, Neil Kinnock, The Troubles, the Falklands War and the UK Miners' Strike of 1984 and 1985 feature throughout the video to name a few defining moments. The closure and destruction of important British industries such as coal mining and steel feature throughout the video, as does the demolition of tenement housing. Scottish, English, Welsh and Irish sporting moments from football and rugby also appear, as well as other national symbolic sports like polo.

In September 2013, Rhino uploaded the official music video to their YouTube channel and as of July 2023, the video has gained over 740,000 views.

== Chart performance ==
"Good Morning Britain" spent a total of eight weeks on the UK Singles Chart, debuting at number 52 for the week of 6 October 1990.

In Europe, "Good Morning Britain" reached a peak of number 22 on the Eurochart Hot 100 in its second week. In its first week of release, it debuted at number 24 on that listing.

In the United States, "Good Morning Britain" did not enter the Billboard Hot 100 chart, but did reach a peak of number 12 on the US Billboard Alternative Songs chart. It is estimated to have spent a total of five weeks in the top 30 of the Billboard Alternative Songs chart.

== Charts ==
Chart (1990)	Peak position
Europe (Eurochart Hot 100)	60
UK Singles (OCC)	19
US Alternative Songs (Billboard)	12
