= Somewhere in My Heart =

1988 single by Aztec Camera

Single by Aztec Camera

from the album Love
- B-side: "Everybody Is a Number One" (Boston '86 version); "Down the Dip"; "Jump"
- Released: 11 April 1988
- Genre: Sophisti-pop
- Length: 3:52
- Label: WEA
- Songwriter: Roddy Frame
- Producer: Michael Jonzun

Aztec Camera singles chronology
"How Men Are" (1988)	"Somewhere in My Heart" (1988)	"Working in a Goldmine" (1988)

Music video
- "Somewhere in My Heart on YouTube

"Somewhere in My Heart" is a song by Scottish band Aztec Camera. It was released as the third single from their third studio album, Love (1987). The song was produced by Michael Jonzun and written by Roddy Frame. Released as a single in 1988, the track peaked at number three on the UK Singles Chart and became a top-40 hit in Australia and Ireland. The music video was directed by John Scarlett-Davis and produced by Nick Verden for Radar Films.

== Background ==
Frame said in 2014 that the song has been "great" for him, but at the time of creating the album, the song was not "in keeping" with the rest of Love. Frame revealed in a radio interview with the "Soho Social" programme, presented by Dan Gray, that he considered "Somewhere in My Heart" an odd song and initially thought it would be best as a B-side.

Around this time, Frame had become somewhat of a recluse, living in a remote wooden shack in Hollywood, Marple Bridge, in the hills above Manchester, "going through periods of good and bad mental health," while continuing to write music, including the lyric "from Westwood to Hollywood" in the song.

== Critical reaction ==
Cash Box wrote that Frame had "pull[ed] a rabbit out of his lens cap" with "Somewhere in My Heart", saying that it was "a pop song that sounds like a hit." In their album review of Love, In the 80s mentioned that, "It is anchored by the song Somewhere in My Heart, which, of course, is the ultimate pop song", while AllMusic stated that Love "belatedly took off after its second [sic] single, Somewhere in My Heart".

== Track listings ==
7-inch single

A. "Somewhere in My Heart"
B. "Everybody Is a Number One" (Boston '86 version)

12-inch single

A1. "Somewhere in My Heart" (remix)
B1. "Everybody Is a Number One" (Boston '86 version)
B2. "Down the Dip"
B3. "Jump"

Mini-CD single

1. "Somewhere in My Heart" – 4:00
2. "Walk Out to Winter" – 3:49
3. "Still on Fire" – 3:43
4. "Everybody Is a Number One" (Boston '86 version) – 3:16

== Chart performance ==
The song reached number three on the UK Singles Chart. It also reached number 34 on the Australian Singles Chart.

=== Weekly charts ===
Chart (1988)	Peak position
Australia (ARIA)	34
Europe (Eurochart Hot 100)	11
Ireland (IRMA)	6
UK Singles (Official Charts)	3
West Germany (GfK)	45

=== Year-end charts ===
Chart (1988)	Position
UK Singles (OCC)	81

== Certifications ==
Region	Certification	Certified units/sales
United Kingdom (BPI)	Silver	200,000^{‡}
^{‡} Sales+streaming figures based on certification alone.
