= Jonzun Crew =

American electro and early funk–hip hop group

- Origin: Boston, Massachusetts, United States
- Genres: Electro, funk, hip hop
- Years active: 1981–1990
- Labels: Tommy Boy/Warner Bros. Records; A&M Records; Critique Records
- Past members: Maurice Starr; Soni Jonzun; Michael Jonzun; Gordon Worthy; Steve Thorpe

Jonzun Crew was an American electro and early funk–hip hop group that was active in the 1980s. The group was led by Michael Jonzun, his brothers Maurice Starr and Soni Jonzun, and Carl (Captain Fingers).

== Overview ==
The Jonzun Crew was formed by Florida-born brothers Michael, Soni, and Larry Johnson (also known as Maurice Starr) in Boston in 1981, with Gordy Worthy and Steve Thorpe filling out the lineup. The group carried its spin on Parliament-Funkadelic's loopy sci-fi themes of Afro-futurism throughout the 1980s and early 1990s for several albums.

The group's most famous tracks, "Pack Jam (Look out for the OVC)", "Space Is the Place", and "Space Cowboy" were featured on the group's debut album, Lost in Space (1983). Other notable tracks included "We Are the Jonzun Crew" and "Ground Control". All of the synthesizer parts were played live as opposed to sequenced, and despite using drum-machine hits in its tracks, most of the group's songs used a live drummer as the main drum track, giving its songs a unique groove and swing compared with most electro music of the era.

In 1986, Michael Jonzun left the group.

== Cultural impact ==
“Pack Jam (Look out for the OVC)” was often played in the background while the rundown of top hits in Germany were counted on the German-language Top Hits show Formel Eins during the 1980s.

By 1987, the Berlin Wall featured a block-long graffiti mural immortalizing the Jonzun Crew.

In 1998, Tommy Boy Records issued a remix of "Pack Jam" by Grooverider as part of its Greatest Beats Remix series.

== Discography ==
=== Albums ===
Year	Album	Peak chart positions	
Year	Album	US	US R&B
1983	Lost in Space	66	17
1984	Down to Earth	—	—
1990	Cosmic Love	—	—
"—" denotes releases that did not chart.

=== Singles ===
Year	Single	Peak chart positions				
Year	Single	US Dance	US R&B	US Pop	UK	GER
1982	"Pack Jam"	36	13	108	―	19
1983	"Space Cowboy"	—	12	―	88	―
1983	"Space Is the Place"	63	31	―	―	—
1983	"We Are the Jonzun Crew"	―	37	―	―	―
1984	"Time Is Running Out"	—	66	―	―	—
1985	"Lovin'"	—	40	―	―	—
1985	"Tonight's the Night"	—	—	―	―	—
1991	"Cosmic Love"	—	62	―	―	—
"—" denotes releases that did not chart or were not released in that territory.
