= Oblivious (Aztec Camera song) =

Single by Aztec Camera

from the album High Land, Hard Rain
- Released: 1983
- Genre: Alternative rock; new wave
- Length: 3:05
- Label: Rough Trade/Sire
- Songwriter: Roddy Frame
- Producers: Bernie Clarke, John Brand

Aztec Camera singles chronology
"Pillar to Post" (1982)	"Oblivious" (1983)	"Walk Out to Winter" (1983)

"Oblivious" is a song written by Roddy Frame and originally performed by Scottish new wave band Aztec Camera. It was released as the second single from their 1983 debut album High Land, Hard Rain.

== Release ==
The song managed a moderate charting of No. 47 on the UK Singles Chart in February 1983. WEA re-released the song on 28 October 1983, with a special edition of the single including an additional two songs. WEA promoted this single with press ads, posters, and displays. This reissue proved more successful, entering the top twenty and peaking at No. 18.

Upon its original release Record Mirror said that Frame's "writing oozes personality and his guitar playing is simply dreamy." Discussing the re-release, the same publication said that "with the might of Warner behind them, the former Rough Trade reprobates should lap up the cream". They also highlighted the song's acoustic guitar and "languid vocals".

== Music video ==
A music video was filmed for Oblivious at the Madewood Plantation House in Napoleonville, LA.

== Charts ==
Chart (1983)	Peak position
Ireland (IRMA)	25
UK Singles (Official Charts)	18
