= Gary Sanctuary =

British musician

Gary Sanctuary is a British musician. Since 2023 he has been the keyboardist of Simply Red.

== Career ==
He has recorded and toured with a number of musicians, including Michael McDonald, George Benson, Chaka Khan, Maxi Priest, Aztec Camera, Beverley Craven, Terence Trent D'Arby, Jaki Graham, and Terry Callier. He has also been a long-term collaborator with Jean-Paul 'Bluey' Maunick and Incognito. Between 2010 and 2013, he toured with the Three Friends band, formed by guitarist Gary Green and drummer Malcolm Mortimore, former members of the progressive rock band, Gentle Giant.
