= Knife (album) =

Studio album by Aztec Camera
- Released: 21 September 1984
- Recorded: February–June 1984
- Studio: Air Studios
- Genre: Indie pop
- Labels: Sire (LP), WEA (CD)
- Producer: Mark Knopfler

Aztec Camera chronology
| High Land, Hard Rain (1983) | Knife (1984) | Love (1987) |

Singles from Knife
- 1. "All I Need Is Everything" Released: 1984; 2. "Still on Fire" Released: 1984

Knife is the second album by Scottish indie pop group Aztec Camera, released on 21 September 1984. It reached number 14 on the UK Albums Chart – their highest showing at that time. It also charted at No. 29 on the Swedish Albums Chart.

An expanded version of the album was released on CD in 2012, which included remixes, b-sides and live tracks from the associated singles from the album.

== Background and Writing ==
Shortly after New Years Day 1984, Aztec Camera went through a significant line-up change that saw Roddy Frame retaining bassist Campbell Owens, adding drummer David Ruffy, guitarist Malcolm Ross of Orange Juice and keyboardist Guy Fletcher of Dire Straits.

In an interview with the NME in 1984, Roddy stated that "The LP is basically about division, division in the brain even between the mad or intuitive side. It's generally the first side that is more rewarding for me. I see that in relationships..."

Talking about the composition of the lead single 'All I Need is Everything', to Jamming! Magazine: "I wrote the single back in March when I was in America. Firstly I had the tune and three chords, and then after a long struggle I managed to get the lyrics to it. It is an unusual choice for a single, because unlike our previous singles (and most pop singles) it doesn't have a recurrent chorus at all. Most of the album was written in America in the early part of the year after we'd finished the Costello tour.."

Further stating that "the opening chords of "All I Need is Everything" are from Jimmy Cliff's "Many Rivers To Cross". I think it is a kind of nod of the head, or tap of the hat, to the writer rather than stealing it on the quiet. I'm a great fan of Love and have used some of their stuff as well.." He also expanded on the album's themes: "The themes are basically musical themes, rather than being philosophical, or pseudo- philosophical.."

Roddy defended the choice of producer Mark Knopfler, which was slightly ill-received by the press and when questioned:

"Mark was totally my choice - doesn't it seem like my choice!?" [laughs]"

He then added:

"I think he gets very good guitar sounds, and has done some particularly good arrangements in the past, particularly for films... I liked the idea of him producing because I wanted to do longer songs, with musical themes. The title track, "Knife", is over nine minutes long, and it was good to have someone of his experience there to help work things out. The album also contains a version of the single [All I Need is Everything] with an instrumental conversation between a classic guitar and a synthesizer..."

Roddy later reflected on working with Knopfler in 1993, whilst promoting the album 'Dreamland':

"When I was working on it, I remember it was quite hard, because Mark was such a taskmaster at the time. I think he's relaxed now, but at the time he was a workaholic, and we really spent a lot of time getting that record right. He took a lot of control in terms of arrangements, and at the time it was a little bit of a struggle, but I knew that what he was going for was really, really ace. It's quite a sophisticated record for its time, actually."

In another interview, he talked about the meaning of the title-track:

"Its about being on the other side of the ocean from your lover...and a relationship being endangered by outside influences.",

He also added that its about "fake relationships, no matter how much you try and make it work with them...it takes 2 people.."

And, when in 1999 about the band's catalogue to The Scotsman, Roddy spoke on the writing process for the album and the common threads with the band's debut and later albums:

"When we were out with Elvis Costello, I met a nice woman and stayed in New Orleans and wrote the Knife album mostly there on a four-track with a borrowed guitar. It was a nice way to write, believe me.. 'The Birth of the True' followed on from 'Down the Dip' on the first album, and it set the tone for pretty much always having an acoustic song ending the album ... 'All I Need is Everything' is when we stepped up and started working in proper studios, with proper arrangements. It's a pretty good indication of what's on that album. It is about arrangements, about getting into using effects and stuff like that."

== Release & Reception ==
Professional ratings
Review scores
| Source | Rating |
|---|---|
| AllMusic | 4/5 stars |
| Alternative Rock | 8/10 |
| Christgau's Record Guide | B+ |
| Rolling Stone | 2/5 stars |

Aztec Camera changed labels from Rough Trade to WEA after 'High Land, Hard Rain', at the album's release, Roddy defended his decision to move to a major label:

"Basically to do what I have done with this album. Financially we did not have the facilities we have now." (Modesty forbade him to mention that the deal also gave Rough Trade a slice of their WEA royalties and helped them out of considerable financial straits.) "I don't see what you gain on a small label. You only make life more difficult for yourself. The independent idea is very strange. What exactly are you independent of? You are competing with the big labels and often using their distribution networks, but miss out on not having the money to back it up. We are really happy with our deal, we have plenty of freedom and total artistic control, and being on a big label means there are people to organise things for you so that you can concentrate on more important things like writing."

During 1984, Aztec Camera's profile had been outmatched by the popularity of the Smiths, who Thompson said had borrowed from Frame's musical intent and made it more accessible.

"All I Need Is Everything" was released as a single in September 1984, while 'Still on Fire' followed. The album was released to mostly positive reviews, but often with skepticism aimed at the choice of producer Mark Knopfler of Dire Straits, Peter Anderson of the NME called the LP "all too smooth, too polished" due to Knopfler's involvement.

Author Dave Thompson wrote in his book Alternative Rock (2000) that this shift altered Frame's vision for the band; taking cues from Elvis Costello, Frame set about making what Thompson said was the "far wordier, if no less obsessively introspective canvas" which became Knife. It was produced by Mark Knopfler, also of Dire Straits. Thompson said Frame and Knopfler was "a marriage which guaranteed musical standards to match Frame's aspirations." He further commented that the "dubious recruitment" of Knopfler became a "godsend as Frame's earlier fragility starts turning towards darker, earthen energies.

== Track listing ==
All songs written by Roddy Frame.

Side one

1. "Still on Fire" – 3:56
2. "Just Like the USA" – 4:03
3. "Head Is Happy (Heart's Insane)" – 4:16
4. "The Back Door to Heaven" – 5:22

Side two

1. "All I Need Is Everything" – 5:44
2. "Backwards and Forwards" – 4:13
3. "The Birth of the True" – 2:42
4. "Knife" – 9:05

== Personnel ==
- Roddy Frame – vocals, guitar
- David Ruffy – drums, backing vocals
- Campbell Owens – bass, backing vocals
- Malcolm Ross – guitar, backing vocals
- Guy Fletcher – piano, keyboards, backing vocals
- Frank Ricotti – percussion
- Chris White – saxophone
- Martin Drover – trumpet
