= Michael Jonzun =

American musician and producer

Michael Jonzun is a musician and music producer. His specialty genres are electro, electronic dance, and electrofunk.

Born in Florida, he formed the Jonzun Crew in Boston with Steve Thorpe and Gordy Worthy. In the early 1980s, the group recorded electro dance tracks including "Pack Jam (Look Out for the OVC)" and "Space Cowboy". The former was inspired by Michael Jonzun's distaste toward the popular Pac-Man video game.

He made several more LPs in the 1980s, but with less commercial success. He also produced many recordings by other artists. He collaborated with his brother, Soni Jonzun, and with collaborator Maurice Starr, contributed to early tracks by both groups. He also worked on Peter Wolf's Lights Out and Tom Browne's Rockin' Radio. In 1986, he left the band to pursue a solo career and released an album on A&M Records.

In 2012, Jonzun sued the estate of Michael Jackson for $24 million, claiming co-writing credit on "This is It," a song Jackson recorded in 2009 with Paul Anka. In March 2014, a federal judge dismissed the suit.

== Discography ==
Albums

- Lost in Space (1983)—Jonzun Crew—songs written and produced by Michael Jonzun (Tommy Boy/Warner Bros. Records)
- Down to Earth (1984)—Jonzun Crew Featuring Michael Jonzun (Tommy Boy/Warner Bros. Records) (rereleased by A&M/PolyGram Records with a completely different track listing)
- Money Isn't Everything (1986)—Michael Jonzun (A&M/PolyGram Records)

Singles & EPs

- Time Is Running Out (1984)—Jonzun Crew Featuring Michael Jonzun (Tommy Boy/Warner Bros. Records)
- Lovin'/Mechanism (1984)—Jonzun Crew Featuring Michael Jonzun (Tommy Boy/Warner Bros. Records)
- Redd Hott Mama (1985)—Jonzun Crew Featuring Michael Jonzun (A&M/PolyGram Records)
- Games People Play (1986)—Michael Jonzun (A&M/PolyGram Records)
- Burnin' Up (1986)—Michael Jonzun (A&M/PolyGram Records)

Production work

- Lights Out (1984)—Peter Wolf—primary producer and songwriter (EMI America)

== See also ==
- Jonzun Crew
- Maurice Starr
- Aztec Camera (Somewhere in My Heart (song))
