= Aztec Camera =

British musical group

- Aztec Camera line–up, c. late 1980s

Background information
- Origin: East Kilbride, Lanarkshire, Scotland
- Genres: Pop; jangle pop; indie pop; post-punk
- Years active: 1980–1995
- Labels: Postcard; Rough Trade; Sire; Warner Bros.
- Past members: Roddy Frame; See Musicians

Aztec Camera were a Scottish jangle pop band founded in 1980 by Roddy Frame, the group's singer, songwriter and only consistent member. The band released a total of six studio albums: High Land, Hard Rain (1983), Knife (1984), Love (1987), Stray (1990), Dreamland (1993) and Frestonia (1995); and found commercial success with the songs "Oblivious", "Somewhere in My Heart" and "Good Morning Britain" (a duet with former Clash guitarist Mick Jones).

== History ==
=== Early years (1980–1983) ===
Aztec Camera were formed in East Kilbride in 1980 by Roddy Frame and drummer David Mulholland after they had left the punk-inspired band Neutral Blue. Aztec Camera first appeared on a Glasgow cassette-only compilation of local unsigned bands on the Pungent Records label, affiliated with the Fumes fanzine run by Danny Easson and John Gilhooly. The band's first United Kingdom (UK) single release was sold in a 7" format by Postcard Records—a Glasgow-based independent record label cofounded by Edwyn Collins and Alan Horne—in 1981. The single featured the song "Just Like Gold" and a B-side entitled "We Could Send Letters"; an acoustic version of the latter song appeared on a compilation album, entitled C81, that was released on cassette in 1981 through a partnership between NME magazine and Rough Trade Records. Frame, aged 16 years, met Collins for the first time during the Postcard period when the latter was 21 years old.

A second single, also released in 1981, featured the songs "Mattress of Wire" and "Lost Outside the Tunnel". Following the two 7" releases with Postcard, the group signed with Rough Trade Records in the UK and Sire Records in the United States (US) for their debut album. At this point, the band were officially a quartet: Roddy Frame (vocals, guitar, harmonica), Bernie Clark (piano, organ), Campbell Owens (bass) and Dave Ruffy (drums, percussion).

=== High Land, Hard Rain and breakthrough (1983–1984) ===
Aztec Camera's debut album, High Land, Hard Rain was produced by John Brand and Bernie Clarke for the Rough Trade record label. The album was released in April 1983 and was distributed in different formats on Domino Recording Co. Ltd. in the US (in addition to Sire); WEA and Celluloid in France; Nuevos Medios in Spain; Powderworks in Australia; MVM Records in Portugal; and WEA for a general European release. The album was successful, garnering significant critical acclaim, and peaked at number 129 on the Billboard 200. Frame later revealed that the song "Oblivious" was consciously written as a Top of the Pops-type pop song and received a corresponding degree of popularity.

During the recording process for the album, Frame used a different guitar for every song. For the song "Orchid Girl", Frame explained in 2013—during the 30th anniversary tour—that he was attempting to merge the influences of his favorite guitarist at the time, Wes Montgomery, and punk rock icon Joe Strummer. In a late 1990s television interview, Frame explained that a "boy" image was associated with him during this era, and that he was annoyed by it at the time. He was taking his music very seriously—"you don't want to be called 'boy'; especially when you're listening to Joy Division"—but he eventually stopped caring about it.

=== WEA Records and Knife (1984–1987) ===
After High Land Hard Rain, Bernie Clarke left the band, and was replaced by Malcolm Ross on second guitar and backing vocals. Aztec Camera changed record labels once again for the release of their second album, Knife, which was released through WEA (Warner Music Group). Frame revealed in a May 2014 BBC radio interview that he was not informed of the ownership arrangements of the record deal, stating that he was unaware as an 18-year-old that the record company would own the rights to all of his corresponding recordings. After High Land, Hard Rain, Frame spent a significant amount of time living in New Orleans, United States (US), listening to Bob Dylan's album Infidels. Upon reading that Dire Straits' guitarist and singer Mark Knopfler produced the album, Frame began writing songs based on a sound that he thought Knopfler could work with.

Frame signed the band to the WEA record label—at the time his manager was Rob Johnson—and secured Knopfler as the producer for Aztec Camera's second album, Knife, which was released in 1984; Frame explained in 1988 that Knopfler was "professional" and efficient during the recording process. Frame's experimental mindset in relation to music emerged on Knife, as the duration of the titular song is nearly nine minutes and synthesizers appear throughout the album. Prior to the album's release, the band previewed a selection of songs as part of a performance for the BBC television show Rock Around the Clock and the song "All I Need is Everything" received radio airplay subsequent to release. In a 2007 interview alongside Collins, Frame explained further:

He's [Knopfler] a great guitarist. Mark Knopfler's recording techniques were great—you [Collins] would have liked him, 'cos that was ... then, it was quite a thing. 'Cos everyone was going digital, and going MIDI and all that, and his thing was all about using the right microphone. If you use the right microphone, then you don't have to use too much EQ and all that stuff, and it was all about that. Yeah, I kinda liked that—the right mic[rophone], the right amp[lifier], the right kind of board and stuff.

=== Love and line–up changes (1987–1990) ===
At the time that the band's third album Love (1987) was created, Frame was the only original member of the band involved with the project; Love and future Aztec Camera albums were written and recorded by Frame under the "Aztec Camera" moniker, and session musicians recorded with Frame on a track-by-track basis. Frame explained in August 2014 that he contemplated the conception of Love during a three-year hiatus following the release of Knife. Frame said that he moved even further away from the British "indie ethic" and was listening to the "pop end of hip hop", including artists such as Jimmy Jam & Terry Lewis, Cherrelle, the Force MDs and Alexander O'Neal. Frame wanted to make a record based on such influences and "Working in a Goldmine" was the first song to achieve this aspiration.

Frame relocated to the US to record the album—"pretty much against the wishes of Warner Brothers", who were unsure of his decision-making at the time—and was primarily based in Boston, Massachusetts, and New York. Frame recorded with American session musicians, such as Marcus Miller and David Frank, and explained that his audience was "mystified" by the transformation of the band, but he was "too far gone" to care and just wanted to do his "own thing" by that stage. Due to the significant change of musical direction, the album's first three singles did not make a strong impression in the marketplace.

The Love album produced the popular song "Somewhere in My Heart", recorded by Frame with dance, R&B and pop producer Michael Jonzun in Boston. Frame said in 2014 that the song has been "great" for him, but at the time of creating the album, the song was not "in keeping" with the rest of Love. Frame revealed in a radio interview with the "Soho Social" program, presented by Dan Gray, that he considered "Somewhere in My Heart" an odd song and initially thought it would be best as a B-side. Frame concluded, "I can't pick them [the successful songs]."

Frame was asked during a television interview, following the release of Love, about the new sound of the album, and he referenced artists like Anita Baker and Luther Vandross. When asked if the album could be labelled "Middle of the road (MOR)", Frame replied: "Call it what you like. I don't really mind."

=== Stray and "Good Morning Britain" (1990–1993) ===
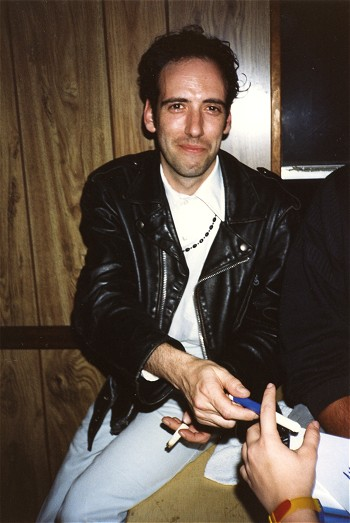
Mick Jones from The Clash collaborated with the band on their 1990 single "Good Morning Britain"

For the band's fourth album, Stray, Frame collaborated with the Clash's Mick Jones on the song "Good Morning Britain", and Jones also toured with the band following the album's release. Jones performed with Aztec Camera at the Glasgow Barrowlands and the Ibiza Festival in 1990. In a 1990 interview, recorded during a tour of Japan, Frame explained that he wrote "Good Morning Britain" in 45 minutes after a two- to three-hour conversation with Jones in the canteen of a London rehearsal studio that both Big Audio Dynamite and Aztec Camera were using. In an August 2014 radio interview, Frame elaborated further, stating that at the time he wrote the song, Jones lived near his London home; Frame visited Jones after recording the song and said to the Clash guitarist, "You'll either sing on it, or you'll want to sue me", as Frame believed the song was so similar to Jones' previous work.

=== Dreamland, Frestonia and split (1993–1995) ===
Frame then recorded the next Aztec Camera album, Dreamland, with Japanese composer Ryuichi Sakamoto. Released in 1993, the album was mixed by Julian Mendelsohn, who had previously worked with the band. While mixing the album at Hook End Manor, an 18th-century red-brick building that had been converted into a studio in the Berkshire countryside of England, UK, Frame explained that he waited for a lengthy period of time to work with Sakamoto, due to the latter's busy schedule. Frame finally met with Sakamoto in Ibiza and both eventually recorded the album in New York City, US over a four-week period. Frame's interest in Sakamoto was elaborated upon in the same interview:

I liked what he did when he was in the Yellow Magic Orchestra, and I also liked that album where he plays the music from Merry Christmas Mr Lawrence on piano. That's where you realise that the atmosphere around his compositions is actually in the writing – it's got nothing to do with synthesisers.

Frame's decision to ask Sakamoto was finalised after he saw his performance at the Japan Festival that was held in London, UK. During the recording process, Frame's routine consisted of: working in the studio from the early afternoon until around 2 am; a turkey sandwich at a deli off Times Square ("because it was possible to get one at two in the morning, and for no other reason"); a cab-ride back to the Mayflower Hotel, where he was staying; an hour of listening to Shabba Ranks; and then bed.

For Frame's final album under the Aztec Camera moniker, and the last original studio recording for the WEA label, Frame worked with renowned production team Langer-Winstanley, who had previously worked with Madness and Elvis Costello. Frestonia was released in 1995 and the Reprise Records label issued it in the US. "Sun" (1996) was the only one song from the album that was released as a single.

== Post break–up activities ==
After the release of Frestonia, Frame finally decided to record under his own name and was no longer a Warner artist. Three Aztec Camera "Best of" compilations were eventually released: The Best of Aztec Camera was released in 1999 by Warner.ESP, a division of the Warner corporation that specialised in compilations; in 2005, Deep and Wide and Tall was released by the Warner Strategic Marketing United Kingdom label as part of the Warner Platinum series; and Walk Out To Winter: The Best of Aztec Camera, a two-disc collection that was released by the Music Club Deluxe label in 2011.

Since the Stray Tour in 1990, Frame has merged a segment of the Bob Dylan song "It's Alright, Ma (I'm Only Bleeding)" into "Down the Dip", from High Land, Hard Rain, and this version of the song was played by Frame at subsequent shows, up until October 2012. Around 2012, Frame included a segment of the Curtis Mayfield song "People Get Ready" in live solo versions of the song "How Men Are", from the Love album. In October 2013, a book entitled The Lyrics: Roddy Frame—containing the entirety of Frame's lyrical work with Aztec Camera—and a High Land, Hard Rain T-shirt were released as part of a "Roddy Frame" collection.

All six Aztec Camera studio albums were reissued in August 2012 by the Edsel Records label, which had previously completed the same process for the studio albums of Everything but the Girl. The reissued editions included bonus tracks and live recordings. In a 1 August 2012 post on his Twitter profile, Frame explained that he was not involved with the Edsel Records reissue and was negotiating with a "supercool US label about releasing the definitive set (w/ rarities, home demos etc.)" in 2013. Domino Recording Company is the label that Frame referred to, but only High Land, Hard Rain was reissued, rather than the entire Aztec Camera catalog. In August 2013, the Domino reissue of High Land, Hard Rain was released in Europe to commemorate the album's 30th anniversary. The reissue was remastered from the original analogue tapes and was physically produced only as a vinyl pressing, but was sold with a digital download of the album.

Domino released an expanded second version of the 30th anniversary reissue of High Land, Hard Rain in 2014 for North America that consisted of two compact discs, 16 additional rarities and liner notes from American music journalist David Fricke (a vinyl version was also released and was sold with a digital download card that provided the additional songs). To accompany the North American version, AED (Analogue Enhanced Digital) Records—a label cofounded by Collins and James Endeacott, the latter a former employee of Rough Trade—also offered a 7" EP to the first 400 buyers.

Following the August 2013 reissue of High Land, Hard Rain, Frame announced three corresponding live performances, at which the album was played in its entirety with a full band. The December 2013 shows occurred in London, Manchester and Glasgow, UK. To replicate the sound of the original recording, Frame switched guitars at the start of each song during the anniversary shows, to match the instrument used in the studio. Original Aztec Camera bassist Campbell Owens attended the Glasgow performance as an audience member—Frame later explained on the Clyde 2 radio station that Owens thanked him backstage after the show and the gesture made the experience worthwhile. At the Glasgow show, Frame and his band also played songs, such as "Green Jacket Grey", that were recorded for High Land, Hard Rain, but did not appear on the final track listing.

When asked in April 2014 about reconnecting with a record that he wrote as a teenager while around the age of 50 years, Frame replied:

The songs that you write when you're young are just a part of you—they stay with you. The interesting thing was how far I kind of strayed from the original versions over the years—I mean acoustically and everything. So, coming back and stripping them down and trying to revisit them in a kind of honest, genuine fashion was actually—even for an old cynic like me—it turned to be a very moving thing ... It [30th anniversary tour] was a very moving experience. It was like we were all revisiting our teenage years together, and it was nostalgic, but in a nice, happy, positive way.

Frame explained in May 2014 that the tour was arranged after he had reconnected with his former Aztec Camera manager, Johnson, who received a call from a prominent UK promoter who asked Frame if he was interested in the concept—Frame agreed to the tour at the time he was first asked.

== Artistry ==
=== Musical style and influences ===
Aztec Camera were primarily a pop group centred on Frame's acoustic guitar work, which featured prominently on their first album High Land, High Rain. Their folk- and jazz-inflected style of pop became more polished on their second album, Knife, with the introduction of electronic synthesizers and R&B elements. R&B grew more prominent on the third album, Love, a dance-pop outing that proved less popular. This development was throttled back for the group's fourth album Stray, which featured more streamlined rock singles and was described by AllMusic as a "loosely connected cycle mingling folk, soul, and pop in varying proportions".

Over the group's career, their music has been described as new wave, sophisti-pop, jangle pop, indie pop, and post-punk.

Frame cited guitarist John McGeoch as influential. "He chose very simple lines over anything bombastic [...] the song came first and he tried to complement that".

=== Causes ===
On 21 January 1985, alongside Orange Juice, the Woodentops and Everything but the Girl, Aztec Camera raised an estimated £18,000 for the striking miners of the National Union of Mineworkers (NUM) through a fundraising event at the Brixton Academy—the year-long strike concluded six weeks later.

Following the release of the Love album, the band were invited to perform at a benefit concert for the Campaign for Nuclear Disarmament (CND) organisation in the late 1980s. Frame explained in a television interview prior to the concert that he was merely the entertainment and would not deliver any speeches.

In 1990, Aztec Camera contributed the song "Do I Love You?" to the Cole Porter tribute album Red Hot + Blue that was produced by the Red Hot Organization. The proceeds from the album benefited HIV/AIDS research.

== Awards and accolades ==
The band's album Love was among the nominations for "Best British Album" at the 1989 Brit Awards. "Somewhere in My Heart", the third single from Love, was the band's biggest hit, reaching No. 3 on the UK Singles Chart. Following the release of the Stray album, "Good Morning Britain" was considered to be a comeback for Frame, as the preceding single "The Crying Scene" had only reached No. 70 in the UK.

== Musicians ==
Roddy Frame – guitar, harmonica, vocals (1981–1995)

Bass

- Campbell Owens (1981–1985, 1990)
- Will Lee (1987)
- Paul Powell (1990–1993)
- Clare Kenny (1990–1993)
- Gary Tibbs (1993)
- Yolanda Charles (1995)

Guitar

- Craig Gannon (1983–1984)
- Malcolm Ross (1984)
- Gary Sanford (1987–1991)

Keyboards

- Bernie Clarke (1981–1983)
- Miffy Smith (1982)
- Tony Mansfield (1983)
- Eddie Kulak (1984–1990)
- Rob Mounsey (1987)
- Gary Sanctuary (1990–1993)
- Mark Edwards (1995)

Drums

- Dave Mulholland (1981)
- John Hendry (1982)
- Patrick David Hunt (1982)
- Dave Ruffy (1983–1988)
- Dave Weckl (1987)
- Kevin Smith (1988)
- Frank Tontoh (1989–1990)
- David Palmer (1993)

Frame changed the band's line-up numerous times over the course of its existence and, in a 1988 interview, Frame explained that the changes were underpinned by a desire to continually improve the quality of their music; however, he differentiated this desire from "blind ambition", whereby popular success is constantly sought after. Early members included Owens (bass) and Mulholland (drums). Gannon was a member from 1983 to 1984 before joining the Smiths, while guitarist Malcolm Ross (formerly of Josef K and Orange Juice) joined the band in 1984 and played on the Knife album.

=== Other musicians ===
- Guy Fletcher of Dire Straits – Keyboards (1984)
- Paul Carrack – keyboards (1990)
- Edwyn Collins – guitar, vocals (1990)
- Mick Jones – guitar, vocals (1990)
- Steve Sidelnyk – percussion (1990–1993)
- Ryūichi Sakamoto – keyboards (1993)
- Victor Bailey – bass (1993)
- Barry Finclair – violin (1993)
- Marcus Miller – bass (1987)
- Steve Gadd - drums (1987)
- Sylvia Mason-James – vocals (1993)
- Romero Lubambo – guitar (1993)
- Vivian Sessoms – vocals (1993)
- Naná Vasconcelos – percussion (1993)
- Sue Dench – strings (1995)
- Claudia Fontaine – vocals (1995)
- Leo Payne – strings (1995)
- Audrey Riley – strings (1995)
- Chris Tombling – strings (1995)

== Discography ==
- High Land, Hard Rain (1983)
- Knife (1984)
- Love (1987)
- Stray (1990)
- Dreamland (1993)
- Frestonia (1995)

== See also ==
- List of new wave artists
- List of Scottish musicians
