= High Land, Hard Rain =

Studio album by Aztec Camera
- Released: February 1983
- Recorded: September 1982 – January 1983
- Studios: ICC, Eastbourne
- Genres: Jangle pop; pop; alternative pop; new wave; folk rock; folk-pop; post-punk; indie pop; sophisti-pop
- Length: 36:44
- Label: Rough Trade
- Producers: John Brand, Bernie Clarke

Aztec Camera chronology
High Land, Hard Rain (1983)	Knife (1984)

Singles from High Land, Hard Rain
- 1. "Just Like Gold" / "We Could Send Letters" Released: 17 April 1981; 2. "Pillar to Post" / "The Queen's Tattoos" Released: 27 August 1982; 3. "Oblivious" / "Orchid Girl" Released: 21 January 1983; 4. "Walk Out to Winter" / "Set the Killing Free" Released: May 1983

High Land, Hard Rain is the debut album by the jangle pop band Aztec Camera. It was released in February 1983 through Rough Trade Records. It reached number 22 on the UK Albums Chart in April 1983.

== Background and recording ==
Following the demise of the Forensics, vocalist and guitarist Roddy Frame formed Aztec Camera in 1980 with bassist Alan Welsh and drummer Dave Mulholland. By the end of the year, Welsh was replaced by Campbell Owens. The band supported the Rezillos at the Bungalow Bar in Paisley, Renfrewshire, in December 1980; they were witnessed by Alan Horne of Postcard Records, who signed them days afterwards. Preceded by press attention in Sounds, "Just Like Gold" was released as a single, reaching number 10 in the UK Independent Singles Chart. "Mattress of Wire" followed as the next single, reaching number eight on the same chart. A planned album for Postcard, titled Green Jacket Grey, was scrapped, and around this time, Mulholland left the band. The band relocated to London and temporarily drafted in Blair Cunningham of Haircut One Hundred, before the role was permanently taken by Dave Ruffy of the Ruts. Keyboardist Bernie Clarke joined soon afterwards.

Aztec Camera recorded their debut studio album at the International Christian Communication studio in Eastbourne in three weeks. Frame said they were "rush[ed], but that was good because sometimes you can hear a bit of pressure in the album." He mentioned that they doubled-tracked his Masano-branded acoustic guitar, which he acquired two months before the recording sessions. He used the "slightly percussive thing where you can hear the plectrum scraping each string", which became more percussive when they doubled-tracked it, "because the two guitars end up slightly out of time."

== Composition ==
Frame said the album's acoustic sound was not intentional; he was using an acoustic guitar "trying to be contrary when everyone else was getting more into [guitar] effects again. Acoustic sounded refreshing to me ..." The album included two early songs by Frame, "We Could Send Letters" written in 1979 and "Lost Outside the Tunnel" which was performed by Frame's pre-Aztec Camera band Neutral Blue. The single "Oblivious" was a conscious attempt to write a pop hit. He intentionally borrowed the guitar part from "Maybe the People Would Be the Times or Between Clark and Hilldale" (1967) by Love for it. Frame said "Pillar to Post" was purposely trying to emulate the work of the Clash and bands on the Tamla-Motown label. "Down the Dip" was the last track written for the album; Frame came up with it during a period where he was experimenting with chords, only to return to basic chord progressions. It is inspired by a local East Kilbride pub located close to Duncanrig Secondary School, Roddy Frame's high school. Originally called "The Diplomat" ("The Dip" for short), it is now called Gardenhall Inn.

== Release ==
High Land, Hard Rain was released through Rough Trade Records in February 1983. It was produced by John Brand and Bernie Clarke. The album was distributed on Domino Recording Co. Ltd. in the US (in addition to Sire), WEA and Celluloid in France, Nuevos Medios in Spain, Powderworks in Australia, MVM Records in Portugal, and WEA for a general European release.

== Critical reception ==
Professional ratings
Review scores
Source	Rating
AllMusic	5/5 stars
American Songwriter	4/5 stars
Christgau's Record Guide	A−
Paste	8.7/10
Pitchfork	8.3/10
PopMatters	9/10
Rolling Stone	4/5 stars
Select	5/5
Spin Alternative Record Guide	9/10
Uncut	9/10

The album was successful, garnering significant critical acclaim. It peaked at number 22 on the Albums Chart and at number 129 on the US Billboard 200. Frame later revealed that the song "Oblivious" was consciously written as a Top of the Pops-type pop song and received a corresponding degree of popularity. Writing for The New York Times in 1983, music critic Jon Pareles wrote that Aztec Camera "traffic in the sounds of folk-rock" and that "If not for the firmness of the rhythm section and the clever use of echoes, Aztec Camera's High Land, Hard Rain (Sire) might almost have been made 15 years ago."

Author Dave Thompson wrote in his book Alternative Rock (2000) that the album was "haunting, hopeful, and howling. Pop this brittle should be treated like fine crystal."

== Track listing ==
All tracks are written by Roddy Frame.

Side one
No.	Title	Length
1.	"Oblivious"	3:09
2.	"The Boy Wonders"	3:13
3.	"Walk Out to Winter"	3:23
4.	"The Bugle Sounds Again"	2:56
5.	"We Could Send Letters"	5:43

Side two
No.	Title	Length
1.	"Pillar to Post"	3:59
2.	"Release"	3:41
3.	"Lost Outside the Tunnel"	3:40
4.	"Back on Board"	4:50
5.	"Down the Dip"	2:10
Total length:		36:44

1991 CD reissue bonus tracks
No.	Title	Original release	Length
11.	"Haywire"	'Oblivious' EP	3:57
12.	"Orchid Girl"	'Oblivious' EP	2:33
13.	"Queen's Tattoos"	"Pillar to Post" b-side	2:09

2012 CD reissue bonus tracks
No.	Title	Length
11.	"Queen's Tattoos"	2:09
12.	"Haywire"	3:56
13.	"Orchid Girl"	2:32
14.	"Set the Killing Free"	3:45
15.	"Oblivious [12" mix]"	3:49
16.	"Walk Out to Winter [12" extended version]"	7:46
17.	"Oblivious [12" extended remix]"	4:36

2013 reissue bonus 7"
No.	Title	Length
1.	"Boy Wonders (Capitol Radio session)"
2.	"Release (Capitol Radio session)"
3.	"We Could Send Letters (C81 Version)"
4.	"The Bugle Sounds Again (Bedroom Demo)"

2014 30th Anniversary Edition reissue bonus tracks
No.	Title	Length
1.	"Pillar to Post (original single version)"	3:43
2.	"Queen's Tattoos"	2:12
3.	"Orchid Girl"	2:35
4.	"Haywire"	3:59
5.	"Walk Out to Winter (7") (Tony Mansfield version)"	3:48
6.	"Set the Killing Free"	3:47
7.	"Back on Board (live on CFNY)"	4:22
8.	"We Could Send Letters (live on CFNY)"	6:55
9.	"Walk Out to Winter (Kid Jensen session)"	3:34
10.	"Down the Dip (Kid Jensen session)"	2:25
11.	"Back on Board (Kid Jensen session)"	4:17
12.	"Release (Kid Jensen session)"	3:49
13.	"Walk Out to Winter (John Brand unreleased single mix)"	3:25
14.	"Walk Out to Winter (12") (Tony Mansfield version)"	7:48
15.	"Oblivious (Colin Fairley remix)"	3:51
16.	"Oblivious (Langer/Winstanley remix)"	4:37

== Personnel ==
- Roddy Frame – vocals, guitar, harmonica
- Bernie Clarke – piano, organ
- Campbell Owens – bass
- Dave Ruffy – drums, percussion
