= Roddy Frame =

Scottish musician

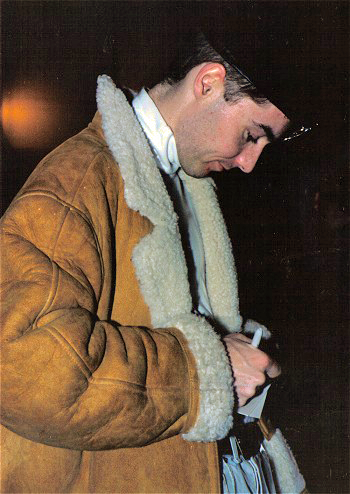
- Frame in 1987

Background information
- Born: 29 January 1964 (age 62); East Kilbride, Lanarkshire, Scotland, United Kingdom
- Genres: Indie pop; new wave; rock; pop; folk; post-punk
- Occupations: Musician, singer-songwriter
- Instruments: Vocals; guitar; harmonica
- Years active: 1980–present
- Label: Independiente
- Formerly of: Aztec Camera
- Website: roddyframe.com

Roddy Frame (born 29 January 1964) is a Scottish singer-songwriter and musician. He was the founder of the 1980s new wave band Aztec Camera and has undertaken a solo career since the group's dissolution. In November 2013, journalist Brian Donaldson described Frame as: "Aztec Camera wunderkind-turned-elder statesman of intelligent, melodic, wistful Scotpop".

Since the end of the Aztec Camera project, Frame has released four solo albums, the most recent of which is 2014's Seven Dials.

== Early life ==
Frame grew up in East Kilbride, South Lanarkshire, Scotland, and went to Canberra Primary School and Duncanrig Secondary School. Frame was surrounded by music from a very young age, as his elder sisters were music fans and listened to a great number of artists, such as the Beatles and the Rolling Stones.

He started to learn guitar playing at a very early age. During his early years playing guitar, Frame frequently listened to Wilko Johnson and was able to play many of Johnson's songs as a result.

As a child and adolescent, Frame was inspired by a variety of musical influences, including David Bowie, the Velvet Underground, the Byrds and Love. Following the advent of the punk subculture, Frame states that he was drawn to it, as "it said, 'Anyone can do it. You can form a band.' ... It was liberating." He cited John McGeoch's guitar playing with Magazine and Siouxsie and the Banshees as one of his main influences.

Frame was attracted to the fashion sense of punk bands like the New York Dolls and the Sex Pistols, but was subsequently inspired by the look of the Fall's Mark E. Smith.

Frame isolated Bowie as a seminal influence, revealing that he would play the song "Space Oddity" to his mother repeatedly.

== Music career ==
=== Aztec Camera ===
Frame's first band was called Neutral Blue. Then, at the age of 16, Frame joined the Postcard Records roster—alongside Orange Juice and Josef K—and his next band, Aztec Camera, began to record a series of low-budget singles, such as "Just Like Gold" and "Mattress of Wire". The music of Aztec Camera drew attention from both John Peel, a presenter on BBC Radio 1, and the New Musical Express (NME).

In 1983 Aztec Camera released High Land, Hard Rain, their first album on Rough Trade Records, which did not include the first two Postcard singles, aside from a re-recording of "We Could Send Letters", which had been the B-side of "Just Like Gold". The album's opening song, "Oblivious", was a hit single, and Aztec Camera were consequently recognised as one of the key acts on the Rough Trade label. On tracks such as "Walk Out to Winter" and "Back on Board", Frame sang poetic lyrics about love lost and love found, themes that he would revisit on subsequent Aztec Camera albums. The album also garnered attention for the band in the United States, and American magazine Creem published a review following its initial release that proclaimed: "The world ain't perfect. But High Land, Hard Rain comes close."

After High Land, Hard Rain, Frame spent a significant amount of time living in New Orleans, US, listening to Bob Dylan's album Infidels. Upon reading that Dire Straits' guitarist and singer Mark Knopfler produced the album, Frame began writing songs based on a sound that he thought Knopfler could work with. Frame then signed the band to the WEA record label and managed to hire Knopfler to produce Aztec Camera's second album, Knife, which was released in 1984. The duration of the titular song is nearly nine minutes, while "All I Need is Everything" received radio airplay.

Around this time, Frame became somewhat of a recluse, living in a remote wooden shack in Hollywood, Marple Bridge, in the hills above Manchester, "going through periods of good and bad mental health," while continuing to write music for Aztec Camera's next album, including the lyric "From Westwood to Hollywood" in the song "Somewhere in My Heart".

Aztec Camera's third album, 1987's Love, was recorded in the US with soul, R&B and pop producers such as Michael Jonzun, Tommy LiPuma and Rob Mounsey. By this stage of the band's history, Frame represented its single driving force and he explained in 2014: "... I was young and I wanted to do things like go to America and make a sort of Jimmy Jam & Terry Lewis record". The album was engineered by Eric Calvi, who had previously worked with Afrika Bambaataa and Al Jarreau, and featured the backing vocals of soul and R&B singers such as Dan Hartman and Tawatha Agee. One of the radio singles from Love, "Somewhere in My Heart", was Aztec Camera's first "top 10" chart hit and Frame later explained that his inspiration at the time of writing the song was Bruce Springsteen.

The diversity of Frame's musical influences was further exhibited in 1990's Stray, for which he performed a duet with musical hero Mick Jones of the Clash on the song "Good Morning Britain". The single release of the song featured a live performance at the Glasgow Barrowland venue, where Jones also performed, and a cover photograph by Bleddyn Butcher.

Frame then recorded the next Aztec Camera album, Dreamland, with Japanese composer Ryuichi Sakamoto. Released in 1993, the album was mixed by Julian Mendelsohn, who had previously worked with the band. For Frame's final album under the Aztec Camera moniker, and the last original studio recording for the WEA label, Frame worked with renowned production team Langer-Winstanley, who had previously worked with Madness and Elvis Costello. Frestonia was released in 1995 and the Reprise Records label issued it in the US.

All six Aztec Camera studio albums were reissued in August 2012 by the Edsel Records label, which had previously completed the same process for the studio albums of Everything But The Girl. The reissued editions included bonus tracks and live recordings. The following year, the Domino Recording Company reissued High Land, Hard Rain to commemorate the album's 30th anniversary, including a vinyl pressing of the album that was released in the second half of 2013. A white cotton T-shirt with the album's cover art was produced by and sold on Frame's website. Frame performed a series of live shows in the UK, at which High Land, Hard Rain was played in its entirety with the support of a backing band. According to a media report on 28 August 2013, none of the original band members was involved with the shows and the anniversary event was not an Aztec Camera reunion.

=== Solo career ===
Following Frestonia, Frame pursued a solo career under his own name from 1995 onwards. His first solo album, The North Star, was released in 1998 on the Independiente label and featured the single "Reason For Living". Frame appeared on Jools Holland's Later television show in 1998 to play "Bigger, Brighter, Better", from North Star. In 1999 Frame appeared alongside Neil Finn and Graham Gouldman as part of the BBC Four's Songwriters' Circle series, and played both Aztec Camera and solo songs.

Frame's second solo album, Surf (2002), is a collection of acoustic songs. In a 2002 Guardian interview, Frame explained that he had "written an album about day-to-day life in London; about being 38 and wondering what you're going to do next." The album's cover image is a photograph taken from atop Burwash House in London, UK, by Hannah Grace Deller, Frame's girlfriend at the time, and depicts the city's skyline. Following the album's April 2014 reissue, arts journalist Philip Cummins wrote:

Not since Paul Simon’s Hearts and Bones nor Bruce Springsteen’s Tunnel of Love has there been an album by a singer-songwriter that has explored themes of love, heartbreak and identity as skilfully and masterfully as Roddy Frame has on Surf. It is hard to think of an LP from the last 10 – 15 years that is so masterfully crafted, so fully realised, so enviably achieved ... Surf is, quite simply, one of the most moving, spellbinding and memorable collection of songs I have heard in recent years.

The song "Small World" was used as the theme music for the BBC Television comedy series Early Doors (2003–2004). Frame explained at a 2012 live performance in the UK that "Crossing Newbury Street" is about the time that he spent with Jonzun in Boston, Massachusetts, US, while writing and recording "Somewhere in My Heart". Frame performed his first ever show at the Glastonbury Festival in 2003.

His next solo album, Western Skies, was released in May 2006. Later in 2006, he released a live album called Live at Ronnie Scott's, a recording of a performance that was completed on 29 May 2005, and this was followed in 2007 by Live at The Blue Note, Osaka, another live recording of a show of 21 September 2006 in Japan. Video footage of Frame performing live solo concerts in the UK in both 2005 (Cardiff) and 2008 (Birmingham) was published on the YouTube online video-sharing platform.

In preparation for Frame's next studio album, he signed to AED Records, a record label founded by musician Edwyn Collins—a close friend and collaborator of Frame—and James Endeacott. In a 2011 live performance at London's Bush Hall venue, Frame played the song "White Pony", which would later appear on his fourth solo album, and explained that it was inspired by the death of filmmaker John Hughes and the "coming-of-age" notion.

Frame recorded his next album at Collins's West Heath Yard studio with producer Sebastian Lewsley (Frame stated in a 2013 radio interview that Collins had been "incredibly generous".) and, in June 2013, AED Records announced an "early 2014" release date for Frame's fourth solo album. Frame explained prior to the release of his AED album that he was "spurred" on to record another full-length solo release by a series of live performances with Collins that was followed by a tour with a couple of members of Collins's band. Frame thought the touring band sounded so good that he decided to create a "band record again" and subsequently wrote songs with the touring band in mind.

Prior to the release of Frame's fourth solo album, two songs from the album, "Forty Days of Rain" and "Postcard", appeared on Frame's website in mid-April for listeners to stream. Additionally, AED reissued a vinyl version of the Surf album for Record Store Day on 19 April 2014.

On 4 May 2014, Frame's fourth solo studio album, titled Seven Dials, was released on iTunes. In its review of the album, released eight years after Western Skies, the Scotsman newspaper stated that the "goodwill and energy" generated by the 30th anniversary High Land, Hard Rain tour "informed the completion of this new album", and describes a work filled with "impressionistic snapshots" and "the theme of pulling away ... and moving on elsewhere." The Scotsman reviews concludes:

The entire album is suffused with a non-angsty restlessness. “Bury me at Seven Dials so my soul can never find its way back to where I kissed you” Frame sings on the bittersweet Into The Sun. That sense of valediction is strongest on the poignant English Garden, which could give Damon Albarn a run for his melancholy money and then Elvis Costello with its final, emotional hit. Frame may be a man of few words but he makes them all count.

Frame performed an in-store live show at London, UK's Rough Trade East record store on 8 May 2014—the store offered an album and wristband bundle package that could be purchased and collected on the evening of the performance. Frame also participated in a series of radio interviews for the promotion of the album and appeared on Billy Sloan's Clyde 2 radio programme, which broadcasts throughout Glasgow and West Scotland; Tom Robinson's BBC Radio 6 show; the radio show of Terry Wogan, The Weekend Wogan, on BBC Radio 2; the Monocle 24 radio programme "Culture with Robert Bound"; and BBC Radio 6 with Liz Kershaw.

In a review for the Observer publication, Phil Mongredien awarded Seven Dials three-out-of-five stars, explaining: "his knack for a memorable, soaring chorus is undiminished by time." Mongredien concedes that he finds the slower-tempo songs, such as "Rear View Mirror", as "less compelling", but concludes that "this is a welcome return nonetheless." Q magazine awarded the album four stars, stating, "Melodies unfold, lyrics reveal their meaning and the wait is revealed as having been worth it", while The Scotsman wrote: "Frame may be a man of few words but he makes them all count". The Line of Best Fit website, in support of its 8.5/10 rating, published the following statement as part of its review: "A wonderfully understated record... approaching the restrained, heart-tugging perfection of his eighties peaks".

Frame completed an interview with the French website Le Gorille in July 2014 and stated that his manager had informed him of a live performance in France at the end of 2014. Four German dates were announced in July 2014, whereby Frame will play solo shows during October 2014.

Frame appeared on the "Soho Social" programme of the Soho Radio online media outlet on 19 August 2014, presented by Dan Gray. As of September 2014, Frame is listed as one of the "Artists & Writers" of the UK arm of the Universal Music Publishing Group company.

=== Collaborations ===
Frame has maintained a long-term friendship with Edwyn Collins, who was also signed to Postcard Records in the 1980s with his band Orange Juice. Collins and Frame collaborated on the Aztec Camera album Stray, including a live performance of the song "Consolation Prize". Following Sakamoto's production work on Aztec Camera's Dreamland album, Frame's vocals appeared on the song "Same Dream, Same Destination", from Sakamoto's 1994 album, Sweet Revenge.

Frame performed with Collins in November 2007 during Collins's first concert after his recovery from a serious illness, and the pair played again at the Glastonbury Festival in June 2008, on the Park Stage, and at the Purcell Rooms in London, UK, in September 2008. In 2012 Collins sang "A Girl Like You"—with Frame on guitar and Tim Burgess on backing vocals—and a rendition of the Orange Juice song "Falling and Laughing"—with Frame on guitar—at Burgess's "Tim Peaks Diner" café, as part of the Kendal Calling festival.

Dan Carey and Rob Da Bank, whose band name is Lazyboy, collaborated with Frame on the song "Western Skies"; Frame then re-recorded the song for a solo album of the same name and has performed an acoustic rendition of the song in live settings, with the inclusion of a harmonica solo. At a 2011 Glasgow performance, Frame explained that he had been listening to reggae-influenced music at the time of writing the lyrics and recorded the song at Da Bank's personal home.

=== Cover versions ===
Frame recorded cover versions of "In My Life", by The Beatles; "Bad Education", by Blue Orchids; Cyndi Lauper's "True Colors"; and a slowed-down version of "Jump", originally recorded by Van Halen.

In regard to the Van Halen cover version, Frame explained in a 1990 interview that he had seen the band in concert in the US for his birthday and started experimenting with the song afterwards. Frame found that the lyrical content of the song conveyed sadness, in contrast to the upbeat music of "Jump", and ended up with a version that sounded like "Sweet Jane", by The Velvet Underground.

During an October 2012 solo performance at the Paisley Abbey venue in Paisley, Scotland, Frame performed a rendition of the Jesse Rae song "Inside Out", which was written for the dance band Odyssey. Frame explained that during his time as a WEA artist, he was asked about Rae, who was conveyed as a Scottish musician who always wore a kilt and helmet. Frame expressed "love" for the song and explained that he enjoyed playing the song while at home. Frame played "Inside Out" during a live performance on BBC 6 Radio in early September 2014. Frame explained that, like "Jump", when "Inside Out" is slowed down, additional meanings become apparent, such as the notion of infidelity in the case of the latter.

=== Touring ===
Frame has performed a total of 58 live shows under his own name, including a UK tour throughout October 2011 with a small backing band.

The 30th anniversary High Land, Hard Rain tour of December 2013 was performed at the following UK venues: London's Theatre Royal, Manchester's Bridgewater Hall and Glasgow's Royal Concert Hall. The official European tour dates following the release of Seven Dials were announced in late August 2014. Frame is scheduled to play in cities such as Munich, Germany; Paris, France; Amsterdam, the Netherlands; and Vienna, Austria, in addition to Aberdeen, Glasgow and London. Frame stated during an August 2014 interview that he was interested in completing most of the tour by train.

== Influences ==
In a 1988 interview, Frame spoke of the significant influence of the "punk revolution" during his early adolescence, when he began writing songs around the age of 13. He spoke of subsequently discovering Alternative TV (ATV), which led to an exploration of earlier music influences, as ATV's co-founder Mark Perry was himself influenced by Frank Zappa and Arthur Lee's band Love.

Following the release of the Aztec Camera album Dreamland, Frame explained in a 1993 Scottish television interview that the highlight of his career up until that point was meeting one of his musical heroes, American soul artist Al Green, while recording "Somewhere in My Heart" with Jonzun and Maurice Starr. Frame said that he did not know if he could ever "feel that good about music again" and then played the Dreamland song "Safe in Sorrow", which he explains is based on the "Al Green feel".

In another television interview following the release of Dreamland, Frame explained that politics were not a significant influence upon his songwriting up until that point. Frame mentioned Billy Bragg and explained that while Bragg "toils" away politically, he believed that people really want to listen to personal songs:

I feel more comfortable writing, kind of, personal, one-to-one songs. I think politics is tricky, and when it comes down to it, man, my favourite records are, like, uh, you know: three chords and a prayer, you know? ... but when it comes down to it, you wanna hear The Elgins, singing "Put Yourself In My Place"; preferably from a jukebox, so it's got a nice kick to it, you know?

As a promotional prelude to the release of Seven Dials, Frame appeared in music magazine Q, and also selected a playlist "of favourite songs which evoke a sense of place", as a reference to the London landmark that the album is named after. Frame's playlist included songs by Joe Strummer, Calle Sanlucar, The Clash, Grace Jones, Louis Armstrong and the Cocteau Twins.

== Personal life ==
Frame married in 1990. In 1993, Frame had been residing in London for 11 years, but still considered Scotland his "spiritual" home. However, Frame said that he was not a "patriot" and considered himself a "global citizen".

In an August 2014 radio interview, Frame said that following the recording of Knife, he embarked on an extended hiatus in which he "didn't really know what I was doing, to be honest." Frame said that he disappeared for three years after signing to the Warner label, while his manager communicated with Warner's representatives, who were keen to hear the next Aztec Camera album. Frame was not musically productive during this period, "lying around" smoking cannabis:

[I was] contemplating the record [Love], you know, absorbing influences ... did really what you should do at that age, I think, and just wasted a lot of time, reading and listening to stuff, and travelling a bit ...

As of August 2002, Frame lived in a "Notting Hill mansion-block flat" in London. He stated in March 2014 that, while he does not play the guitar every day, his songwriting activity has increased since the recording of Seven Dials. He owns a collection of guitars, including a 1974 Fender Telecaster and a series of "nice, big, fat" semi-acoustic guitars.

== Solo discography ==
- The North Star (Independiente, 1998) (UK No. 51)
- Surf (Redemption, 2002) (UK No. 91)
- Western Skies (Redemption, 2006)
- Seven Dials (AED, 2014) (UK No. 50)

=== Live albums ===
- Live at Ronnie Scott's (2006)
- Live at The Blue Note, Osaka (2007)

== See also ==
- List of Scottish musicians
- Music of Scotland
