= Orange Juice discography =

- Studio albums: 3
- Live albums: 2
- Compilation albums: 7
- Singles: 15
- Video albums: 1
- Mini albums: 1
- Box sets: 1

The discography of the Scottish new wave/jangle pop band Orange Juice consists of three studio albums, one mini-album, two limited release live albums, seven compilations, one box set, one video album, and fifteen singles (including an unreleased "Wan Light" single and a re-release of "Blue Boy").

== Albums ==
=== Studio albums ===
Title	Album details	Peak chart positions	
Title	Album details	UK	NZ
You Can't Hide Your Love Forever	Released: 19 February 1982; Label: Polydor; Formats: LP, MC	21	—
Rip It Up	Released: November 1982; Label: Polydor; Formats: LP, MC	39	—
The Orange Juice	Released: November 1984; Label: Polydor; Formats: LP, MC	—	28
"—" denotes releases that did not chart.

=== Mini albums ===
Title	Album details	Peak chart positions
Title	Album details	UK
Texas Fever	Released: March 1984; Label: Polydor; Formats: LP, MC	34

=== Live albums ===
Title	Album details
Thrillingly Live at Stirling OJ '81	Released: 2013; Label: AED; Formats: MC; Limited release
Live at Valentinos	Released: December 2015; Label: AED; Formats: MC; Limited release

=== Compilation albums ===
Title	Album details	Peak chart positions
Title	Album details	UK
In a Nutshell	Released: July 1985; Label: Polydor; Formats: LP, MC	—
Orange Juice / Can't Hide Your Love Forever	Released: 28 January 1991; Label: Polydor; Formats: CD, MC	—
The Esteemed – The Very Best of Orange Juice	Released: 27 July 1992; Label: Polydor; Formats: CD, MC	—
Ostrich Churchyard	Released: 14 September 1992; Label: Postcard; Formats: CD, LP, MC; Release of the previously unreleased debut Orange Juice album for Postcard Records along with a John Peel Session	—
The Heather's on Fire	Released: 1993; Label: Postcard; Formats: CD, LP; Collection brings the first four singles together along with some more radio sessions	—
A Casual Introduction 1981/2001	Released: 28 October 2002; Label: Setanta; Formats: CD; Compilation of Edwyn Collins' solo work and Orange Juice	—
The Glasgow School	Released: 25 July 2005; Label: Domino; Formats: CD; Compilation of Postcard-era tracks, including a previously unheard Nu-Sonics demo of the Ramones "I Don't Care".	150
"—" denotes releases that did not chart.

=== Box sets ===
Title	Album details
Coals to Newcastle	Released: 8 November 2010; Label: Domino; Formats: 6xCD+DVD, digital download; Anthology of all Orange Juice's previously released and unreleased output

=== Video albums ===
Title	Album details
dAdA with Juice	Released: May 1985; Label: PolyGram Music Video; Formats: VHS, LaserDisc

== Singles ==
Title	Year	Peak chart positions				Album
Title	Year	UK	UK Indie	IRE	NZ	Album
"Falling and Laughing"	1980	—	48	—	—	Non-album singles
"Blue Boy"	1980	—	15	—	—	Non-album singles
"Simply Thrilled Honey"	1980	—	5	—	—	Non-album singles
"Poor Old Soul"	1981	—	5	—	—	Non-album singles
"Wan Light" (scheduled but never released)	1981	—	—	—	—	Non-album singles
"L.O.V.E... Love"	1981	65	—	—	—	You Can't Hide Your Love Forever
"Felicity"	1982	63	—	—	—	You Can't Hide Your Love Forever
"Two Hearts Together"/"Hokoyo"	1982	60	—	—	—	Non-album single
"I Can't Help Myself"	1982	42	—	—	—	Rip It Up
"Rip It Up"	1983	8	—	23	42	Rip It Up
"Flesh of My Flesh"	1983	41	—	—	—	Rip It Up
"Bridge"	1984	67	—	—	—	Texas Fever
"What Presence?!"	1984	47	—	—	—	The Orange Juice
"Lean Period"	1984	74	—	—	—	The Orange Juice
"Blue Boy" (re-release)	1993	—	—	—	—	The Heather's on Fire
"—" denotes releases that did not chart or were not released in that territory.
