= The Glasgow School =

Compilation album by Orange Juice
- Released: 25 July 2005
- Recorded: 1978–1981
- Genre: Post-punk, indie pop
- Length: 62:43
- Label: Domino

Orange Juice chronology
| The Heather's on Fire (1993) | The Glasgow School (2005) |

Professional ratings
Review scores
| Source | Rating |
|---|---|
| AllMusic | 4.5/5 stars |
| Blender | 4/5 stars |
| Pitchfork Media | (9.3/10) |

The Glasgow School is a compilation album by the Scottish band Orange Juice, released in 2005. It contains the band's four singles for Postcard Records, the greater part of the 1992 compilation album Ostrich Churchyard (which contains early versions of tracks that later appeared on the 1982 album You Can't Hide Your Love Forever), an alternate version of "Simply Thrilled Honey", and a cover of "I Don't Care" by the Ramones, recorded when the band were still known as The Nu-Sonics. This material was all recorded between 1978 and 1981, prior to the band signing with Polydor Records.

== Track listing ==
All tracks were composed by Edwyn Collins; except where indicated

1. "Falling and Laughing" – 4:00
2. "Moscow" (James Kirk) – 2:01
3. "Moscow Olympics" (James Kirk) – 2:07
4. "Blue Boy" – 2:53
5. "Love Sick" – 2:27
6. "Simply Thrilled Honey" – 2:43
7. "Breakfast Time" – 1:56
8. "Poor Old Soul (Part 1)" – 2:29
9. "Poor Old Soul (Part 2)" – 2:36
10. "Louise Louise" – 2:50
11. "Three Cheers For Our Side" (James Kirk) – 2:52
12. "In A Nutshell" – 4:06
13. "Satellite City" – 2:42
14. "Consolation Prize" – 3:10
15. "Holiday Hymn" (Vic Goddard) – 3:00
16. "Intuition Told Me (Part 1)" – 1:13
17. "Intuition Told Me (Part 2)" – 3:22
18. "Wan Light" (James Kirk) – 2:30
19. "Dying Day" – 3:09
20. "Texas Fever" – 1:44
21. "Tender Object" – 4:40
22. "Blokes on 45" (James Kirk) – 4:13
23. "I Don't Care" (Douglas Colvin, Jeffrey Hyman, John Cummings, Tom Erdelyi) – 3:08

== Personnel ==
Orange Juice

- Edwyn Collins
- James Kirk
- David McClymont
- Steven Daly
