= The Secret Goldfish =

Scottish band

- Origin: Glasgow, Scotland
- Genres: Alternative rock
- Years active: 1994–1999
- Label: Creeping Bent
- Past members: Katy McCullars; John Morose; Graham Lironi; Paul Turnbull; Steven McSeveney

The Secret Goldfish are a band from Glasgow, Scotland. The group was formed by ex-Fizzbombs singer Katy McCullars, guitarist John Morose, and the rhythm section from the Mackenzies, Graham Lironi and Paul Turnbull.

== History ==
The band took their name from an imaginary book mentioned in the novel The Catcher in the Rye. They released three albums and several singles in the 1990s, on the Glasgow-based Creeping Bent record label. Their first album, 1996's Aqua Pet...You Make Me, was produced by Stephen Lironi. Their sound has been described as "sounding much like The Jesus and Mary Chain locked in a public toilet with Jefferson Airplane and The New York Dolls". An album of B-sides and outtakes, Jet Streams, was released in 1997, and in 1999 they issued the Somewhere in the World EP, the lead track of which was co-written by Vic Godard and featured Francis MacDonald and Stevie Jackson. A second album, Mink Riots followed in 1999. After a lengthy hiatus, the Secret Goldfish returned to live performance in 2016 with a second guitarist (former Orange Juice guitarist James Kirk), with a third album (Petal Split) being released on Creeping Bent in April 2017.

Final line-up:

- Katy McCullars: vocals
- John Morose: guitar
- Steven McSeveney: bass
- Paul Turnbull: drums

== Releases ==
=== Albums ===
- Aqua Pet... You Make Me (BENT 012) (1996)
- Jet Streams (MACD 44712) (April 1997)
- Mink Riots (BENT 044) (1999)

=== E.P.'s and singles ===
- "Seasick" (BENT004) (1995)
- "Come Undone" (BENT008) (1996)
- Dandelion Milk Summer e.k.o.k. e.p. (BENT016) (1996)
- Venus Bonding E.P. (BENT018) (1996)
- "Tartan Envy" (BENT020) (1997)
- "Give Him a Great Big Kiss" (BENT024) (1997) (split single with Policecat)
- "Punk Drone" (BENT032) (1998) (split single with Scientific Support Dept.)
- "Somewhere In China" (ER-193) (1998)
- Somewhere in the World E.P. (November 1998)
- "You're Funny 'Bout That Aren't You" (BENT042) (1999) (split single with Nectarine No. 9)
- "4 Excited People" (BENT048) (1999) (split single with Vic Godard)

== Album track listings ==
=== Aqua Pet... You Make Me ===
1. "Come Undone" (3:01)
2. "Tartan Envy" (3:09)
3. "The Boy Who Left Home To Learn Fear" (5:52)
4. "Pet Thang" (1:56)
5. "Dandelion Milk Summer" (3:43)
6. "Venus Bonding : Erotic Mars" (2:08)
7. "I Will See You Through" (4:52)
8. "I Left One Out, Where Did It Go" (2:23)
9. "Seasick" (2:51)
10. "Glass Mountain" (2:09)
11. "The Catalyst" (2:20)
12. "Strawberry St." (2:35)
13. "Another Short Song About Love And Loss" (2:35)
14. "Bandovian Curve" (2:43)
- Produced by Stephen Lironi & engineered by Larry Primrose, except "The Catalyst" and "I Left One Out, Where Did It Go", produced by the Secret Goldfish & engineered by Johnny Cameron
- Mastered by John Davis at Whitfield Street Studios, London
- All songs by McCullars / Morose, except "The Catalyst" written by G Lironex

=== Jet Streams ===
The album includes covers of The Fire Engines, Shangri-Las, Orange Juice, The Velvet Underground and Nirvana songs.

1. "This Arsehole's Been Burned Too Many Times Before" (2:42)
2. "Casanova Killer" (4:40)
3. "Ambulance" (0:43)
4. "Give Him A Great Big Kiss" (2:45)
5. "Wasted In Carluke" (1:53)
6. "Blue Sky Yesterday" (1:23)
7. "Sunless" (3:36)
8. "Tartan Envy (Luv n Haight Version)" (3:23)
9. "Allegro" (0:42)
10. "Come as You Are" (3:12)
11. "Rude Awakening" (3:51)
12. "Everywhere That You Go" (3:49)
13. "Pink Drone" (5:07)
14. "Afterhours/Intuition Told Me" (3:02)
- Produced by the Secret Goldfish, except 3, 7 & 12 - produced by Stephen Lironi
- Recorded by Johnny Cameron, Paul McGeechan & Larry Primrose
- Design - Stefan Kassel
- Photography - Colin Dunsmuir
- Released on Marina Records

=== Mink Riots ===
1. "You're Funny 'Bout That, Aren't You?" (4:37)
2. "Somewhere in the World" (3:45)
3. "Laughing Inside" (6:13)
4. "Scenecruiser" (4:09)
5. "Honestly, It Was Nothing" (3:16)
6. "4 Excited People" (2:41)
7. "Take My Hand" (2:39)
8. "Hey! Mr. Fox" (2:48)
9. "Elevate #2" (3:10)
10. "Pink Drone" (9:18)
- Douglas MacIntyre — producer
- Katy McCullars — vocals
- John Morose — guitar, vocals (background)
- Steven McSeveney - bass, vocals (background)
- Paul Turnbull - drums
- Stevie Jackson — vocals (background)
- Francis MacDonald — organ (hammond), wurlitzer, vocals (background)
- Gregor Reid — engineer, mixing, producer, vibraphone, tape manipulation
- Paul McGeechan — mastering

=== Petal Split ===
1. "O. Pioneers" (3:14)
2. "Amelia Star" (3:48)
3. "Phonecall" (2:52)
4. "X" (3:00)
5. "Winter Tears # 2" (1:49)
6. "Outrageous Things" (3:56)
7. "Good Kissers" (2:49)
8. "El Capitan Y Mi" (3:01)
9. "A Different Game" (2:14)
10. "Ain't That Always The Way" (3:00)
- Artwork – Victoria Braithwaite
- Bass – Steven McSeveney
- Co-producer – David Scott (tracks: 1, 2, 5, 6, 8, 10)
- Drums – Paul Turnbull
- Guitar, Keyboards, Written By – John Morose
- Keyboards – David Scott (tracks: 1, 2, 6, 10)
- Lead Vocals, Written By – Katy McCullars
- Producer – Douglas MacIntyre (tracks: All)
- Written By – David Henderson (tracks: A1), Edwyn Collins (tracks: 10), M. Ashman (tracks: 6), Simon Smeeton (tracks: 1), Vic Godard (tracks: 6)
- All tracks written / co-written by McCullars & Morose, except 6 & 10.
