= The Phantoms & the Archetypes =

Studio album by Paul Quinn and the Independent Group
- Released: 1992
- Length: 45:55
- Label: Postcard
- Producer: Edwyn Collins

Paul Quinn and the Independent Group chronology
The Phantoms & the Archetypes (1992)	Will I Ever Be Inside of You (1994)

The Phantoms & the Archetypes is the debut studio album by Scottish band Paul Quinn and the Independent Group, released by Postcard Records in 1992.

== Background ==
After releasing a handful of singles in the mid-1980s, Paul Quinn was left unable to record and release further material due to legal wranglings between his label Swamplands, run by Alan Horne, and its parent label, London Records. Once resolved, Quinn returned to the music scene by forming the Independent Group and recording the album The Phantoms & the Archetypes, with Edwyn Collins as producer. Horne, who was a member of the new group, resurrected his Postcard Records label, which had been defunct since 1981, and the album was the first new release on the label in 1992.

Speaking to Daily Record in 1993 about the legal problems and The Phantoms & the Archetypes, Quinn stated, "I wasn't allowed to do anything, and it was very frustrating. I was constantly coming up with ideas, but there didn't seem any point in writing new songs. But I've no regrets. I was happy with my album – I thought it was a record of quality. I know I make music which is uncompromising and low key. I prefer music that's not too accessible."

== Critical reception ==
Professional ratings
Review scores
Source	Rating
NME	7/10

Upon its release, John Mulvey of NME described The Phantoms & the Archetypes as "the album Quinn always threatened to make" and continued, "[It's] a cool, moody collection of torch and twanging, of songs that aren't quite the classics they brazenly aspire to be, and with an acute understanding of soul that puts the final nail in the coffin of all the style charlatans and arch-wankers like Hue and Cry. It's all very late-night, low-key, knowing stuff, of course. But the sheer panache and audacity of Quinn's voice coupled with slick songs ensure the album's style never cripples its content." He concluded, "There's no doubt the whole package is something of a hangover from another time, but when it's from a time so maverick, exciting and too often forgotten, and when it gives talent like Quinn's a belated showcase, then living in the past can be wholeheartedly forgiven." Paul Lester of Melody Maker praised it as "a soulful country album (or countrified soul album) of superb quality and distinction", with "every track worthy of weepy investigation and every title speak[ing] volumes about the exquisite misery contained within". He added, "If anything, the album recalls the tearful slow (e)-motion balladry of the eponymous LP Orange Juice left before they split, Quinn's half-ironic croon evoking blissful memories of Collins' three-quarters-ironic croon note for pathos-drenched note."

In 2010, Uncut included the album at number 14 on their "The 50 Greatest Lost Albums" list. Reviewer Damien Love praised Quinn as "one of the most extraordinary singers out of Scotland" and noted that, on this "film noir of a record", his voice "wander[s] through dark shadows of soul, pop and country on ballads like 'Punk Rock Hotel' and exquisitely desolate covers including the Carpenters' 'Superstar'". Love, writing in a 2003 issue of Uncut, had also called the album "a haunted masterpiece where bone-weary echoes of soul, pop and country comforted each other as Quinn's voice described regret".

== Track listing ==
No.	Title	Writer(s)	Length
1.	"The Phantoms & the Archetypes"	Robert Hodgens, Paul Quinn, Alan Horne	4:50
2.	"Born on the Wrong Side of Town"	Hodgens, Quinn	4:14
3.	"What Can You Do to Me Now?"	Willie Nelson, Hank Cochran	3:21
4.	"Should've Known by Now"	Hodgens, Quinn, James Kirk	4:26
5.	"Punk Rock Hotel"	Hodgens, Quinn, Horne	5:48
6.	"Superstar"	Leon Russell, Bonnie Bramlett	3:17
7.	"Call My Name"	Hodgens, Quinn	4:27
8.	"The Damage Is Done"	Hodgens, Quinn, Horne	4:00
9.	"Darling I Can't Fight"	Hodgens, Quinn, Horne	6:15
10.	"Hangin' On"	Buddy Mize, Ira Allen	5:14

== Personnel ==
Paul Quinn and the Independent Group

- Paul Quinn – vocals
- James Kirk – guitar
- Robert Hodgens – guitar
- Campbell Owens – bass
- Blair Cowan – keyboards
- Tony Soave – drums
- Alan Horne

Production

- Edwyn Collins – production
- Kevin Key – engineering

Other

- Alan Horne – sleeve design, photography
