= Music for Stowaways =

Music for Stowaways / Music for Listening to

Studio album by British Electric Foundation
- Released: 13 March 1981 (cassette)
- Genre: Electronic; ambient; synthpop; experimental
- Length: 32:11 (cassette); 20:25 (LP)
- Label: Virgin
- Producer: Ian Craig Marsh; Martyn Ware

British Electric Foundation chronology
Music for Stowaways / Music for Listening to (1981)	Music of Quality and Distinction Volume One (1982)

Music for Stowaways is the debut studio album by the English electronic act British Electric Foundation (B.E.F.), formed by musicians Martyn Ware and Ian Craig Marsh. The album released in the United Kingdom as a limited edition cassette on 13 March 1981 by Virgin Records, who also released an LP version of the album titled Music for Listening To later in the year with a different track list and cover art, aiming its release for export markets. The Stowaways version was originally released concurrently with Ware and Marsh's first single with Heaven 17, "(We Don't Need This) Fascist Groove Thang", itself a developed version of the Music for Stowaways track "Groove Thang".

As B.E.F.'s first 'minor project', Music for Stowaways was inspired by the Sony Walkman (at the time known in the UK as the Sony Stowaway). Fascinated with how the portable cassette player made users feel like what they described as film characters, they conceived Music for Stowaways as a "soundtrack for your life" designed specifically for play on the Sony Stowaway, and incorporated portable recording equipment into the album's production to maximise the effect. The album is instrumental and electronic, incorporating styles of synth-pop, ambient, funk, avant-garde and minimalist music. Largely ignored upon release, the music has been praised in retrospect, with critics crediting both the cassette and LP versions of the album as being prophetic of later musical styles.

== Background ==
Sheffield musicians Martyn Ware and Ian Craig Marsh had formed the synthesiser-only band The Human League (originally named The Future) in 1977, originally as a duo before gradually adding further members and signing to Virgin Records. After recording several singles and the albums Reproduction (1979) and Travelogue (1980), Ware and Marsh left the band, frustrated with bandmate Philip Oakey and the group's musical direction. Hoping to avoid the mistakes they felt their former group were making, Marsh and Ware formed British Electric Foundation (B.E.F.) as both a company and a production team. Simon Reynolds cites B.E.F. as the first example of a new pop group "[talking] about rejecting the staid structures of the band in favour of the dynamic and flexible 'production company'," and noted it fashioned itself as "a mini-corporation that negotiated with record companies as their equal." The company had one non-musical partner, Bob Last.

As a 'production company', the group could hire and fire vocalists session musicians while on a no-royalty, flat-fee basis and work with unpaid machines. Though still in debt from their Human League days, Ware and Marsh signed a new contract with Virgin for British Electric Foundation. Ware recalled: "It was really an unusual deal. We had to deliver one major act to Virgin every year, and each year we had to provide albums for every act signed in previous years." The first 'major act' signed as part of the deal was Heaven 17, a group featuring Ware and Marsh with their friend Glenn Gregory as vocalist, though B.E.F. were allowed to deliver as many as twelve minor album projects to Virgin each year, which the label was then obliged to distribute. Marsh described these projects as "essentially art projects – instrumental works, like Eno's Ambient series." The act conceived Music for Stowaways, a project for the cassette format, as the first of these minor projects.

== Production ==
=== Concept and influences ===
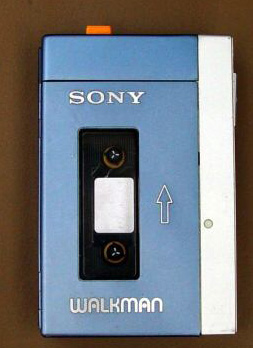
The album was inspired by and written to be played on the Sony Walkman.

Music for Stowaways was inspired by the band's love for the then-new Sony Walkman, at the time called the Sony Stowaway in the United Kingdom, and was intended to be played on the device. The group's concept behind the album, described by Ware as the album's "theory," was based on part of their fascination with the Stowaway, as they found that the device allowed owners to "design a soundtrack for your everyday life for the first time and have it playing while you walked around or whatever." Ware later explained: "[That] became the theory behind [Music for Stowaways]. It was about how you could play your music and change your mood wherever you were. Basically, the Walkman liberated music. And there we were at the sharp end with this cassette-only release."

Speaking in 2005, Marsh more broadly described "moving around London on the tube, going to meetings, working all over the place, and listening to music on these Stowaways" as inspiring the album. He described the album's concept as "the soundtrack for your life" and said that listening to music on Stowaways "made you feel like you were in a film all the time. Everyone takes that for granted now, but you can't imagine the big impact it had – almost on the level of something like virtual reality." The album was also inspired in part by Brian Eno's Music for Films (1978). Ware explained that he always enjoyed the idea of "music written for a purpose – for a film soundtrack, a theatre piece... I’ve always thought narrative was important."

=== Recording ===
Music for Stowaways was recorded in a single spurt in the weeks following Ware and Marsh leaving the Human League, and was produced by the pair together, except for "The Optimum Chant" which was produced by their Heaven 17 bandmate Glenn Gregory. Both Music for Stowaways and Heaven 17's Penthouse and Pavement (1981) were recorded on a simplistic Ampex 8-track machine with only six of its tracks functioning normally. Writer Mark Cunningham writes that "[s]ynchronisation between the machine and synthesisers was achieved not with a SMPTE generator but an unpredictable pilot tone, and the hardware sequencing was purely monophonic. Ware also purchased a Roland Jupiter 4 synth around this time." The launch of the Sony Walkman had also coincided with music recording equipment becoming smaller and more portable, and although Ware and Marsh had "a studio, of sorts," they were more intrigued in visiting people's houses, recording ideas on portable recording equipment and then "feeding those back in." Ware later recalled: "It's like we were interested in the popular technology as much as the popular music, so that first BEF album was like a holy triumvirate of art, music and technology." To ensure the album's audio quality was suitable for portable cassette players, the album was mixed using headphones instead of speakers.

As their only prior musical experience was recording together as the Future and with the Human League, the duo were unused to working with session musicians. Ware asked Gregory, who was concurrently working as a stagehand for The Crucible, Sheffield, to recommend a bass player for "Groove Thang", as they hoped to incorporate a bass solo during a middle break instead of a Roland System 100 pattern. Gregory recommended 17-year old amateur John Wilson. Ware said: "John was a really quiet guy... He came down to the studio with his bass, but he was left-handed so he was playing it the wrong way round, like Hendrix. We said, 'We’re gonna to count you in… One-two-three-four…' and when he started playing the solo, we were all looking at each other going, 'this is fucking awesome'. Or words to that effect." They asked him to play bass on the rest of the track too, and pleased with the results, also pressed him to add guitar, which he claimed was his main instrument, although he later admitted his main instrument was actually the violin, which B.E.F. did not hear him play.

== Composition ==
The music on Music for Stowaways is electronic and mostly instrumental, with a stark, filmic feel according to Vel Ilic of The Quietus. Stephen Grant of Trouser Press described the album as a release of "moody instrumentals" that range from "funk-rock to icy Germanic synth-garde to electro-bop and sound experiments," while Uncut referred to the album's musical style as "icy instrumental electronica." In his post-punk history book Rip It Up and Start Again, writer Simon Reynolds describes the album's style as "peppy synthmuzik" and "a more animated version of ambient," and writes that the album bore the explicit imprint of B.E.F.'s non-musical partner Bob Last, finding it to be "essentially an electronic remake" of The Fire Engines' album Lubricate Your Living Room (1980), an album of "music to go out to" produced by Last, who also conceived its concept. The release is split into two sides: the "Uptown" side features what the writer Red Starr calls "melodic, funky, inventive, energetic, danceable [and] optimistic" music, while the "Downtown" side contains what they described as a "stab at impressionism and atmospherics."

The Music for Listening To LP version of the album, featuring a slightly different track list, was described by John Bush of AllMusic as a synth-pop record which spans "percussion-heavy sequencer trance, free-floating ambience and minimalist proto-techno as well as more recognisable synth-funk," citing "Groove Thang" as an example of the latter genre being incorporated on the album. "Groove Thang," with vocals from Glenn Gregory, is the only track on either version of the album with vocals, though they are brief and lowly mixed. "Wipe the Board Clean" originally dates from the duo's days in 1977 as The Future, and an alternate version of the track was recorded at the time with the name "Titled U.N.". This version was later released on Dance Like a Star (2003), a vinyl EP containing several of The Future's 1977 recordings. Both "Wipe the Board Clean" and "Title U.N." re-appeared on the 2006 Virgin remaster of Penthouse and Pavement alongside Heaven 17's B-side "The Height of the Fighting", which has been described as similar in musical style to Music for Stowaways.

== Release and reception ==
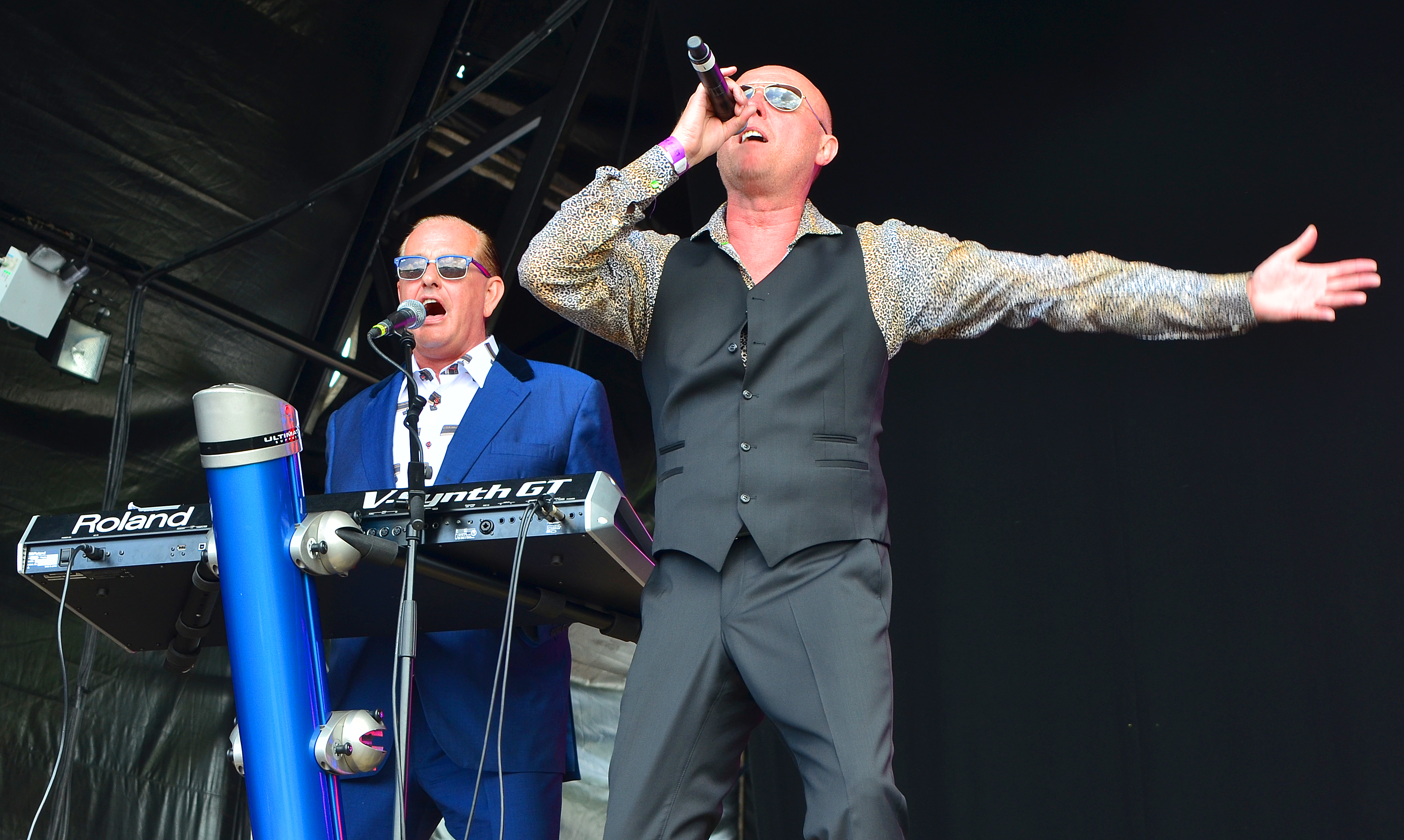
Music for Stowaways was released concurrently with the debut single by Heaven 17 (pictured).

Music for Stowaways was released by Virgin Records in the United Kingdom on 13 March 1981 as a limited edition of 10,000 cassette copies, each copy being numbered and retailed at a price of £3.99. It was released concurrently with Heaven 17's first single, "(We Don't Need This) Fascist Groove Thang", a vocal version of the Stowaways track "Groove Thang". The single was originally issued as a seven-inch and twelve-inch single and later re-released as a three-inch CD, all formats featuring the Music for Stowaways track "Decline of the West" as a B-side. At the time of the album's release, cassette-only releases in the UK were becoming popular, another example being Bow Wow Wow's Your Cassette Pet (1980). Clinton Walker of Rolling Stone Australia felt that both releases were indications of a "cassette revolution." With an estimated second-hand price of £20, Fact magazine refer to Music for Stowaways as a "highly sought after cassette." Virgin also issued a promotional LP version of Music for Stowaways, renamed Dinsongs for Films (Music for Stowaways), for film producers and television companies to potentially use as soundtrack music.

An alternate version of the album with several different tracks, Music for Listening To, was released as an LP later on in 1981, pressed by Virgin in the UK mostly for export sales, although it was also sold in the UK. Bob Last is credited as executive producer and packaging designer on this version. Despite originally being a limited edition, Virgin re-released Music for Stowaways on cassette in 1988, while on 9 September 1997, Virgin's sub-label Caroline Records released a remastered CD of Music for Listening To in the United States, which contained the remaining tracks from Music for Stowaways as bonus tracks. It was announced in October 2013 that the music on both Music for Stowaways and Music for Listening to, as well as an extra track, had been remastered by Seattle-based Medical Records from the original Virgin master tapes for a 180g vinyl LP release titled Music for Turntables in January 2014. Medical founder Troy Wadsworth described reissuing the material as a "dream come true," due to the similarity between some of the music and Travelogue, the final Human League album to feature Ware and Marsh, which he said he was an "addict" for. The album was remastered for re-release in April 2023 by Cold Spring.

In a contemporary review for Smash Hits, Red Starr hailed Music for Stowaways as a "fine debut" that demonstrates the "enjoyable side of electronics." They felt the "Uptown" side was the superior side, while finding the "Downtown" side to be "less essential" but "[occupying] the time very nicely," and rated the release 9/10. In 2015, Uncut magazine included Music for Stowaways on their list of the "50 Greatest Lost Albums of All Time," describing it as "uncompromising, experimental stuff, on one hand harking back to the Human League’s stark Dignity of Labour EP, and yet somehow foreshadowing much of Warp Records' output 15 years later." Meanwhile, although the Music for Listening To version was released to moderate sales, John Bush of AllMusic retrospectively rated it four and a half stars out of five and named it an "Album Pick". He called it "[o]ne of the few synth-pop records of the era -- instrumental or otherwise -- that attempted to develop the universe of possibilities inherent in the form," and felt the music was groundbreaking, saying: "It's not even a matter of sounding dated; Music for Listening To sounds decades ahead of its time and could easily be taken for music produced 20 years later." He credited parts of the album with anticipating techno music. In a 2013 list for The Quietus, Moby ranked Music for Stowaways among his thirteen favourite albums and described "The Decline of the West" as one of his motivations for starting a musical career. Musician Ralf Dörper of Propaganda compared the album to Kraftwerk.

== Track listing ==
=== Music for Stowaways (cassette) ===
==== Side one (Uptown) ====
1. "The Optimum Chant" – 4:10
2. "Uptown Apocalypse" – 3:12
3. "Wipe the Board Clean" – 3:46
4. "Groove Thang" – 4:06

==== Side two (Downtown) ====
1. "Music to Kill Your Parents By" – 1:26
2. "The Old at Rest" – 5:37
3. "Rise of the East" – 2:50
4. "Decline of the West" – 7:05

=== Music for Listening to (LP) ===
==== Side one (Penthouse Side) ====
1. "Groove Thang" – 4:06
2. "Optimum Chant" – 4:12
3. "Uptown Apocalypse" – 3:12
4. "B.E.F. Ident" – 0:37

==== Side two (Pavement Side) ====
1. "A Baby Called Billy" – 4:00
2. "Rise of the East" – 2:50
3. "Music To Kill Your Parents By" – 1:27

=== Music for Listening to (remastered CD) ===
1. "Groove Thang" – 4:06
2. "Optimum Chant" – 4:12
3. "Uptown Apocalypse" – 3:12
4. "B.E.F. Ident" – 0:37
5. "A Baby Called Billy" – 4:00
6. "Rise of the East" – 2:50
7. "Music To Kill Your Parents By" – 1:24

==== Bonus tracks ====
8. "Wipe the Board Clean" – 3:46
9. "The Old at Rest" – 5:37
10. "Decline of the West" – 7:15

== See also ==
- Walkman
