= Rip It Up =

Rip It Up may refer to:

== Music ==
=== Albums ===
- Rip It Up (Dead or Alive album), 1987
- Rip It Up (Orange Juice album), 1982
- Rip It Up (Thunder album), 2017

=== Songs ===
- "Rip it Up" (James Reyne song), 1987
- "Rip It Up" (Little Richard song), 1956, also recorded by Bill Haley & His Comets
- "Rip It Up" (Jet song), 2006
- "Rip It Up" (Razorlight song), 2003
- "Rip It Up" (Orange Juice song), 1983
- "Rip It Up", a 1981 song by Adolescents from the eponymous album
- "Rip It Up", a 2000 song by 28 Days from the album Upstyledown

== Magazines ==
- Rip It Up (New Zealand), a New Zealand-based music magazine
- Rip It Up (Adelaide), a weekly Adelaide street press magazine

== See also ==
- Rip It Up and Start Again, a 2005 book on post-punk music by Simon Reynolds
- Rip It
- Rip (disambiguation)
