= I'm Your Money =

1981 song by Heaven 17

Single by Heaven 17
- B-side: "Are Everything"
- Released: 15 May 1981
- Genre: Synth-pop
- Length: 5:42 (extended version); 5:12 (album version); 3:26 (single version)
- Label: Virgin
- Songwriters: Ian Craig Marsh; Martyn Ware; Glenn Gregory
- Producer: B.E.F.

Heaven 17 singles chronology
"(We Don't Need This) Fascist Groove Thang" (1981)	"I'm Your Money" (1981)	"Play to Win" (1981)

Official audio
- "I'm Your Money" on YouTube

"I'm Your Money" is a song by the English synth-pop band Heaven 17, released on 15 May 1981 by Virgin Records as a non-album single. The song was written by band members Ian Craig Marsh, Martyn Ware and Glenn Gregory, and was produced by B.E.F. (Ware and Marsh).

== Background ==
"I'm Your Money" was released as the band's second single on 15 May 1981. Despite their debut single "(We Don't Need This) Fascist Groove Thang" peaking at number 45 on the UK singles chart earlier in the year, "I'm Your Money" failed to replicate the success and failed to chart, although it did reach number 59 on the Record Business Top 100 Singles Chart.

Speaking of the song's lyrics, Ware recalled to The Quietus in 2010, "I still think that's funny now. It's a very good analogy."

== Critical reception ==
Upon its release as a single, Peter Silverton of Smash Hits described "I'm Your Money" as sounding "just like Kraftwerk once sounded – conscious humour and all". He added that although it is "not as obviously funny" as the band's debut single "(We Don't Need This) Fascist Groove Thang", it is "stronger and harder". Simon Tebbutt of Record Mirror was less enthusiastic, writing, "Seems like I'm one of the few not attracted to the cool sounds and automaton rhythms of Heaven 17. I prefer this to their last single but it all gets a bit relentless and monotonous really." Adrian Thrills of the NME was critical, calling it a "vapid and disposable synthesiser workout" that "lack[s] even the redeeming lyrical virtues of the overrated 'Fascist Groove Thang'".

During his time DJ-ing in the 2000s, Philip Oakey of the Human League would always include "I'm Your Money" in his set. He told This Is Not Retro in 2008 that he thought it is one of Heaven 17's "best and most interesting tracks". In his 2009 book Rip It Up and Start Again: Postpunk 1978–1984, Simon Reynolds described the song as "brilliant" and noted that, like its predecessor "(We Don't Need This) Fascist Groove Thang", it was "also something of a consciousness-raiser, transposing the language of business on to love and marriage à la Gang of Four's 'Contract'."

== Track listing ==
7–inch single (UK)

1. "I'm Your Money" – 3:26
2. "Are Everything" (Pete Shelley) – 2:59

12–inch single (UK, 'Special fortified dance mixes!')

1. "I'm Your Money" – 5:42
2. "Are Everything" (Shelley) – 4:25

== Personnel ==
Heaven 17

- Glenn Gregory – vocals
- Martyn Ware – synthesizers, backing vocals
- Ian Craig Marsh – synthesizers

Additional musicians

- Huanita Rana Martinez – backing vocals
- Christopher Umfreville Wilkinson – backing vocals
- Kurt von Rauchitz – backing vocals
- Elzunia Kardasinska – backing vocals
- David Lockwood – acoustic guitar on "Are Everything"

Production

- B.E.F. – producers, engineers
- Denis Blackham – lacquer cut

Other

- Bob Last – sleeve design
- B.E.F. – sleeve design
- Virginia Turbett – photography

== Charts ==
Chart (1981)	Peak position
UK Top 100 Singles Chart (Record Business)	59
