= I Need Two Heads =

Single by The Go-Betweens
- A-side: "I Need Two Heads"
- B-side: "Stop Before You Say It"
- Released: June 1980
- Recorded: 28 April 1980
- Studio: Castle Sound Studios, Pencaitland, Scotland
- Genre: Post-punk
- Length: 2:29
- Label: Postcard
- Songwriters: Robert Forster, Grant McLennan
- Producer: Alex Ferguson

The Go-Betweens singles chronology
| "People Say" (1979) | "I Need Two Heads" (1980) | "Your Turn, My Turn" (1983) |

"I Need Two Heads" is a stand-alone single by Australian indie group The Go-Betweens. It was released as a 7" vinyl record on the Postcard Records label in the United Kingdom in June 1980 and by Missing Link Records in Australia, with "Stop Before You Say It" as the B-side.

In November 1979 Forster and McLennan travelled to England. It was during this time that their music was influenced by English post-punk bands, such as the Pop Group, the Raincoats and Gang of Four. In February 1980 they were approached by Alan Horne and Edwyn Collins, who had recently established a Glasgow-based independent record label, Postcard Records. In March that year Forster and McLennan went to Glasgow and signed with Postcard Records. During their eight-week stay in Glasgow they played three shows, with label stable mates Orange Juice and Josef K. Postcard Records engaged Alex Ferguson (Alternative TV) to produce a number of the label's releases, including The Go-Betweens. On 29 April Forster and McLennan recorded two songs at Castle Sounds Studios, with Ferguson. They were "I Need Two Heads", a song written after they arrived in England, for which Forster described "I was being confronted with so much information over there, my head was just spinning, and I remember walking down the street thinking: 'I need another head to take this all in'" and "Stop Before You Say It", an older pre-Europe song about irritation. The songs were both recorded using Steven Daly, Orange Juice's drummer.

The single was released in June 1980 after Forster and McLennan had left the UK, where NME named it 'Single of the Week' and it reached No. 6 on the independent charts. In Australia, Melbourne-based independent record label, Missing Link, acquired the rights from Postcard Records to release "I Need Two Heads" in Australia.

== Reception ==
Jonathan Greer, in his review of The Go-Betweens - G Stands for Go-Betweens Volume 1 1978-1984, believes the song is "a wonderfully original piece of post-punk-pop – by turns enigmatic, exciting and unpredictable."

In his book, Simply Thrilled: The Preposterous Story of Postcard Records, Simon Goddard describes the song as a tune which betrays "a susceptibility to 'doomeh' shadows of Joy Division in its ho-humming bass, if not in its frisky handclaps and peculiar lyrics about bank books and child detectives".

PopMatters states that the song sounds "a little like the Velvet Underground covering some obscure Monkees or Mersey-beat songs."

== Track listing ==
=== Original 7" Vinyl release ===
All tracks are written by R. Forster, G. McLennan

| No. | Title | Length |
|---|---|---|
| 1. | "I Need Two Heads" | 2:29 |
| 2. | "Stop Before You Say It" | 2:54 |
| Total length: | | 5:23 |

== Release history ==
| Date | Region | Label | Format | Catalogue |
|---|---|---|---|---|
| June 1980 | United Kingdom | Postcard | 7" vinyl | Postcard 80 4 |
| November 1980 | Australia | Missing Link | 7" vinyl | MISS 23 |

== Credits ==
The Go-Betweens

- Robert Forster — vocals, rhythm guitar
- Grant McLennan — vocals, bass guitar, lead guitar

Additional musicians

- Steven Daly — drums

Production

- Engineer — Calum Malcolm
- Producer — Alex Ferguson
