= Malcolm Ross (musician) =

Scottish guitarist

Malcolm Ross (born 31 July 1960 in Blantyre, Malawi) is a Scottish guitarist. His career started when he played guitar in the Scottish band Josef K. They released a string of singles and an album, The Only Fun in Town, on Postcard Records in the early 1980s.

After the demise of Josef K, Ross joined Edwyn Collins in the group Orange Juice, playing and writing songs for both the Rip it Up and Texas Fever albums. After Orange Juice, Ross joined Roddy Frame in Aztec Camera as the second guitarist, and recorded and toured the Mark Knopfler-produced Knife album. Next, Ross embarked on other projects such as the High Bees with his wife, Syuzen Buckley, and Dave Ruffy (formerly with The Ruts).

In the mid-1980s and throughout the 1990s, Ross worked with many artists such as former Josef K bandmate Paul Haig, Momus, Edwyn Collins, Dave Graney and The Coral Snakes, Blancmange and Barry Adamson (ex-Magazine and The Bad Seeds). He was also hired as musical consultant on The Beatles biographical film Backbeat (1993), and contributed to the original musical score of the film Chocolat (2000), playing guitar alongside Johnny Depp.

Ross appeared on ex-Fire Engine Davy Henderson's band The Nectarine No. 9's last album, I Love Total Destruction (2004), and is currently working with another ex-Fire Engine, Russell Burn, in their new band Stac Lee. Ross continues to play with wife Syuzen in the group Buckley's Chance, mostly around Edinburgh. He has also worked in various one-off projects including The Lonely Crowd with bassist Billy Buckley (his brother-in-law), drummer Chris McArthur and New York songwriter Spike Priggen.

Ross' solo career includes two solo albums on the German label Marina Records, Low Shot (1995) and Happy Boy (1998). A compilation of Ross' work was released on Re-Action Recordings in 2006, and he recently was performing as a member of Barry Adamson's live band.

Ross appeared prominently in the 2015 history of Scotland's post-punk scene, Big Gold Dream.

== Solo discography ==
- "Another Year, Another Town" / "Big Woman" – 7" single – The Bus Stop Label (BUS045) 1994
- Lowshot – CD album – Marina Records (MA14) 1995
- Happy Boy – CD album – Marina Records (MA33) 1998
