= Win (band) =

- Origin: Scotland
- Genres: Pop; avant-pop
- Years active: 1983–1990
- Past members: Davy Henderson; Ian Stoddart (deceased); Russell Burn; Emmanuel Shoniwa; Simon Smeeton; Willie Perry; Karl Mariner

Win were a Scottish pop band from the 1980s, who were best known for the single "You've Got the Power".

== Win ==
After the dissolution of The Fire Engines, Davy Henderson formed Win with Ian Stoddart (drums, keyboards), plus ex-Fire Engine member Russell Burn (keyboards). They were joined by Emmanuel "Mani" Shoniwa (guitar/bass/backing vox), Simon Smeeton (guitar/backing vox), Karl Mariner (keyboards/backing vox), then Willie Perry (keyboards). A more determinedly pop act than The Fire Engines, they were commercially successful in Scotland, partly due to their single "You've Got the Power" being used in a lager advertising campaign for Scottish brewers McEwan's. "You've Got the Power" appeared in the UK Singles Chart at number 95, but reportedly sold enough copies to be a hit, with Henderson stating that many copies of the record sold had been excluded from the chart data, as they (Gallup) thought the single was being illegally hyped in stores around Scotland, rather than recognising that McEwan's was a local firm advertising in the region, with a song by a local band. However, they had another couple of hits in the UK chart with the single "Super Popoid Groove" reaching number 63 and album Uh! Tears Baby (a Trash Icon) getting to number 51 in 1987.

Win were unable to translate these small hits into more widespread success, and did not break through further afield. They released two albums and disbanded in 1990.

== Post-Win careers ==
After Win, Henderson went to working with his new band The Nectarine No. 9, releasing material on Postcard Records, Creeping Bent and Beggars' Banquet Records, and later worked with The Sexual Objects. Willie Perry and Ian Stoddart went on to form The Apples with Samantha Swanson from Hey! Elastica and Callum McNair. Mani Shoniwa formed Yoyo Honey, releasing the album Voodoo Soul in 1992. Ian Stoddart went on to help form Aberfeldy and released the album Young Forever on Rough Trade.

Ian Stoddart died in June 2020, by which time he was a member of Glasgow-based band MONICA, with Lloyd Herriott, Ariane Jackson, Andrea Marini and Simon Shaw.

== Discography ==
=== Albums ===
- Uh! Tears Baby (A Trash Icon) (London, 1987) (number 51 in the UK Albums Chart)
- Freaky Trigger (Virgin, 1989)

=== Singles ===
- "Unamerican Broadcasting" (Swamplands, 1985)
- "You've Got the Power" (Swamplands, 1985/1986; released three times) (number 95 in 1986)
- "Shampoo Tears" (Swamplands/London, 1986)
- "Super Popoid Groove" (Swamplands/London, 1987) (number 63 in the UK Singles Chart)
- "What'll You Do til' Sunday Baby?" (Virgin, 1988)
- "Love Units" (Virgin, 1988)
- "Dusty Heartfelt" (Virgin, 1988)
