= Texas Fever =

EP by Orange Juice
- Released: March 1984
- Genre: Post-punk
- Length: 20:40
- Label: Polydor
- Producer: Dennis Bovell (except "A Sad Lament" produced by Martin Hayles)

Orange Juice chronology
Rip It Up (1982)	Texas Fever (1984)	The Orange Juice (1984)

Singles from Texas Fever
- 1. "The Day I Went Down to Texas" Released: 1983 (UK); 2. "Bridge" Released: 1984 (UK, IE & FR)

Professional ratings
Review scores
Source	Rating
AllMusic	4/5 stars
Sounds	5/5 stars

Texas Fever is a 1984 EP released by the Scottish post-punk band Orange Juice. It was re-issued on CD in 1998 and again in 2014.

== Track listing ==
All tracks composed by Edwyn Collins; except where indicated

1. "Bridge" – 3:38
2. "Craziest Feeling" (Edwyn Collins, Frank Want) – 3:02
3. "Punch Drunk" (Malcolm Ross) – 3:34
4. "The Day I Went Down to Texas" – 2:42
5. "A Place in My Heart" – 3:01
6. "A Sad Lament" – 4:43

CD Reissue Bonus Tracks

1. "Leaner Period"
2. "Out for the Count"
3. "Move Yourself"

== Personnel ==
Orange Juice

- Edwyn Collins – guitar, vocals
- Malcolm Ross – guitar, vocals, keyboards
- David McClymont – bass guitar, keyboards
- Zeke Manyika – drums, vocals, percussion

Technical

- Will Gosling - engineer
- Robert Sharp - sleeve photography
