= Creeping Bent =

Creeping Bent may refer to:

- Agrostis stolonifera, a species of perennial grass
- Creeping Bent (record label), a Scottish record label
