= (We Don't Need This) Fascist Groove Thang =

Single by Heaven 17

from the album Penthouse and Pavement
- B-side: "The Decline of the West"
- Released: 13 March 1981
- Studio: B.E.F.–Maison Rouge (Sheffield)
- Genre: Synth-pop; funk; electro-funk; disco; new wave
- Length: 4:20
- Label: Virgin
- Songwriters: Glenn Gregory; Ian Craig Marsh; Martyn Ware
- Producer: British Electric Foundation

Heaven 17 singles chronology
"(We Don't Need This) Fascist Groove Thang" (1981)	"I'm Your Money" (1981)

Official audio
- "(We Don't Need This) Fascist Groove Thang" on YouTube

"(We Don't Need This) Fascist Groove Thang" is a song by the English synth-pop band Heaven 17. It was their debut single, released on 13 March 1981 by Virgin Records, and the lead single from their debut studio album, Penthouse and Pavement (1981). It was a minor hit in the UK in 1981, despite being banned by the BBC. It was also a minor dance hit in the US. It developed from an instrumental, "Groove Thang", that Martyn Ware and Ian Craig Marsh created earlier that year for Music for Stowaways, an album they released as British Electric Foundation.

== Details and ban by the BBC ==
"(We Don't Need This) Fascist Groove Thang" was written by Heaven 17 members Martyn Ware, Ian Craig Marsh and Glenn Gregory and included on their debut studio album Penthouse and Pavement (1981). It was the first single released by the band.

AllMusic reviewer Stewart Mason describes the song as "clattering and jangled", with multiple electronic rhythm tracks played simultaneously making the song seem faster than its nominal tempo.

In the lyrics fascism and racism are described in an ironic fashion, using the lexicon of funk music. The lyrics of the song also reference the recent election of Ronald Reagan as President of the United States. The song suffered reluctance from UK radio stations to play it and it was banned by the BBC due to concerns by Radio 1's legal department that it libelled Reagan by describing him as a "fascist god in motion". The BBC also informed Heaven 17 that the Reagan reference would need to be changed if they wished to appear on Top of the Pops. To promote the single, Virgin commissioned radio advertisements at a cost of £3,000, but these were initially banned by the Independent Broadcasting Authority (IBA) for breaching its guidelines that no advert "may show partiality regarding political, religious or industrial controversy". The band responded by recording an altered set of lyrics for it, which changed "Reagan, fascist guard" to "Stateside cowboy guard".

== Reception and chart performance ==
Despite the BBC ban, "(We Don't Need This) Fascist Groove Thang" reached number 45 on the UK singles chart. It debuted on that chart on 21 March 1981 and peaked one week later. The single peaked at number 72 in Australia, and was a minor dance hit in the US, reaching number 29 on the Billboard Dance Music/Club Play Singles chart in 1981. The song was ranked at number 4 among the top 10 "Tracks of the Year" for 1981 by NME.

== Personnel ==
Heaven 17

- Glenn Gregory – vocals
- Ian Craig Marsh – synthesisers
- Martyn Ware – synthesisers, Linn LM-1 and backing vocals

Additional musicians

- Josie James – vocals
- John Wilson – bass guitar, rhythm guitar

== Remix ==
A Rapino Brothers remix of "(We Don't Need This) Fascist Groove Thang" was released as a single in 1993, reaching number 40 on the UK singles chart. The remix and original version of the song were included on the compilation album Higher and Higher: The Best of Heaven 17, released in the same year.

== Cover versions ==
- Scottish post-punk band the Fire Engines covered the song for a 23 February 1981 Peel Session on BBC Radio 1.
- German dark wave project Deine Lakaien featured a cover on the 1999 CD Maxi "Into My Arms" (as "(We Don't Need This) Fascist Groove Thing").
- American indie rock band Poster Children covered the song on their 2004 EP On the Offensive.
- American synth-pop band Information Society covered the song in 2016 for their album Orders of Magnitude. It was remixed by Inertia and the Crusher for the DEF CON 24 music compilation that same year, featuring multiple voice samples of American president elect Donald Trump.
- American post-punk band 100 Flowers covered the song in 2017 for release as a digital single and released a 7" vinyl in 2019.
- American rock band LCD Soundsystem released a cover of the song on 2 November 2018, with the lyrics altered to reference Donald Trump instead of Reagan, and included it on their live album Electric Lady Sessions (2019).
- Philadelphia punk rock band the Dead Milkmen released a cover 21 August 2020 on a limited-release 7", with proceeds to benefit the charity Girls Rock Philly.

== See also ==
- Ronald Reagan in music
