= Jazzateers =

Scottish band

- Origin: Glasgow, Scotland
- Years active: 1980–1983, 1985–1986
- Labels: Postcard; Rough Trade; Marina
- Past members: Ian Burgoyne; Keith Band; Alison Gourlay; Colin Auld; Grahame Skinner; Paul Quinn; Dee Rutkowski; Louise Rutkowski; Mick Slaven; Matthew Wilcox; Douglas MacIntyre; Stephen Lironi; Barry Aitchison
- Website: jazzateers.com

Jazzateers were a Scottish underground pop/post-punk group, active for the first half of the 1980s. They recorded for Postcard Records and Rough Trade Records. They have also recently had their original material released by Marina Records, Cherry Red Records and Creeping Bent. The group was formed by members Ian Burgoyne and Keith Band.

== History ==
The band's first line-up consisted of Ian Burgoyne, Keith Band, singer Alison Gourlay and drummer Colin Auld. One of the early Jazzateers recordings with Gourlay on vocals, "Blue Moon Over Hawaii", was later included on the Messthetics series of compilations.

This line-up of Jazzateers was managed by Postcard Records label boss Alan Horne, and an Edwyn Collins-produced cover of a Donna Summer song, "Wasted" was tentatively scheduled for release on Postcard allocated as Catalog Number 81-14. However, as it would become typical of Jazzateers’ inconsistent career, the single was never released.

Paul Quinn was then added to the band as lead vocalist and Alan Horne produced a full-length album called 'Lee,' which also remains unreleased in full.

After the demise of Postcard Records, Paul Quinn and Alan Horne split from the band and Jazzateers followed labelmates The Go-Betweens and Aztec Camera by signing to Rough Trade Records, releasing their first single ('Show Me The Door') and an eponymously-titled LP in 1983 with Graham Skinner, who replaced Quinn as the lead vocalist (although Quinn did stay long enough to contribute some backing vocals to the album sessions).

The album received mostly positive reviews in the UK music press, but yet another line-up change occurred when Skinner left to form the band White Savages with roadie Douglas MacIntyre. Following an aborted attempt to launch his solo career, Paul Quinn returned as the lead vocalist along with Mick Slaven who joined as the lead guitarist. The band had been booked to appear on UK television show, The Switch to promote their Rough Trade album, but instead dropped the Jazzateers moniker and renamed the new line-up as Bourgie Bourgie (performing "Show Me the Door" and "16 Reasons"). This resulted in the band being courted by several major labels in the UK, eventually seeing them sign to MCA (with Kenny MacDonald replacing Colin Auld on drums). They released two singles, "Breaking Point" and "Careless", neither of which made the UK Top 40. An album was also recorded, but, unhappy with the results, Paul Quinn left the band before it could be completed. These album sessions remain unreleased.

The Jazzateers name was revived after the Bourgie Bourgie split, with Matt Willcock joining on lead vocals to replace Quinn, and former roadie Douglas MacIntyre being promoted to third guitarist.

This line-up (along with various session drummers) began recording an album of all new material to be known as ' Blood is Sweeter Than Honey' with a single on the Stampede label ("Pressing On") being released to generally positive reviews in the UK music press. This coincided with Jazzateers promoting the release by touring the UK as special guests of Lloyd Cole and the Commotions. However, history repeated itself when the album release was shelved, and the group split once more shortly thereafter.

Blood Is Sweeter Than Honey was finally released for the first time on Marina Records in 1997 as part of the 'I Shot the President' anthology (coupled with the Rough Trade LP). It later got a limited stand-alone vinyl release on Creeping Bent in 2019.

Much of the band's unreleased Postcard-era recordings were released on CD in August 2014 by Cherry Red Records on the album Don't Let Your Son Grow Up to Be a Cowboy: Unreleased Recordings (which also later got a limited stand-alone vinyl release on Creeping Bent in 2016). The only tracks omitted were the 'Lee' recordings featuring Paul Quinn on lead vocals, as Quinn did not feel they were worthy of release.

== Lineups ==
The band has gone through several lineup changes from 1980 to 1986:

Jazzateers v1 (1980–1981)

Alison Gourlay (vocals)
Ian Burgoyne (guitar)
Keith Band (bass)
Colin Auld (drums)

Jazzateers v2 (1982)

Dee Rutkowski (vocals)
Louise Rutkowski (vocals)

Paul Quinn (vocals)
Ian Burgoyne (guitar, vocals)
Keith Band (bass)
Colin Auld (drums)

Jazzateers v3 (1983)

Grahame Skinner (vocals)
Ian Burgoyne (guitar)
Keith Band (bass)
Colin Auld (drums)

Paul Quinn (backing vocals)

as Bourgie Bourgie (1984)

Paul Quinn (vocals)

Ian Burgoyne (guitar)
Keith Band (bass)
Kenny MacDonald (drums)

Jazzateers v4 (1985-1986)

Matt Willcock (vocals)
Ian Burgoyne (guitar, keyboards)
Keith Band (bass)
Mick Slaven (guitar)
Douglas MacIntyre (guitar)

Stephen Lironi (drums, keyboards)

Andy Harrold (drums)

Skip Reid (drums)
Barry Aitchison (drums)

== Discography ==
=== Albums ===
- Jazzateers a.k.a. Rough 46 (1983), Rough Trade - UK Indie No. 14, reissued in 2013 by Creeping Bent
- I Shot the President (1997), Marina - a compilation of the Rough46 and Blood Is Sweeter Than Honey LPs
- Don't Let Your Son Grow Up to Be a Cowboy: Unreleased Recordings 1981-82 CD - Cherry Red (2014) and Vinyl - Creeping Bent (2016)
- Blood Is Sweeter Than Honey (2019), Creeping Bent

=== Singles ===
- "Show Me the Door" (1983), Rough Trade - UK Indie No. 35
- "Pressing On" (1985), Stampede
- "Here Comes That Feeling" (1997), Marina

=== Compilation appearances ===
- Clear Cut 5 (1983), Japan/Rough Trade: "Once More with Feeling"
- Clear Cut Final (1986), Japan Record: "Sixteen Reasons"
- Fruitcakes and Furry Collars (1986), Record Mirror: "Pressing On"
- New Voices Vol. 14 (1997), Rolling Stone: "Here Comes That Feeling"
- Bentboutique: Chasing the Chimera (2000), Creeping Bent: "Heartbeat"
- Ave Marina (2004), Marina: "Here Comes That Feeling"
- Messthetics #105 (2008), Hyped 2 Death: "Blue Moon Over Hawaii"
- Park Lane Archives (2009), Jungle: "Sixteen Reasons"
