= One Day (Vince Clarke and Paul Quinn song) =

Single by Vince Clarke and Paul Quinn
- B-side: "Song For"
- Released: 10 June 1985
- Length: 3:15
- Label: Mute
- Songwriters: Vince Clarke; Jamie Morgan; Cameron McVey
- Producers: Flood; Daniel Miller

"One Day" is a song by British musician Vince Clarke and Scottish singer Paul Quinn, released as a one-off collaboration single in 1985. The song was written by Clarke, Jamie Morgan and Cameron McVey, and produced by Flood with assistance from Daniel Miller. "One Day" reached No. 99 on the UK Singles Chart and No. 7 on the UK Independent Singles Chart. A music video was filmed to promote the single.

== Background ==
Following the disbanding of Yazoo, Clarke went on to form the music project the Assembly with Eric Radcliffe. Hiring Feargal Sharkey as guest vocalist for their 1983 debut single, "Never Never" reached No. 4 in the UK. The duo intended to record a full album using a variety of different singers, however no further collaborations were negotiated, and Clarke and Radcliffe eventually agreed to pursue their own projects. During 1984, Clarke approached two singers for a possible collaboration, but nothing materialised, while a session with Jamie Morgan and Cameron McVey resulted in the writing of "One Day".

Clarke recorded the backing track of "One Day" with producer Flood in 1985. An unnamed reggae singer was then hired to record the vocals, however when he proved unable to comfortably match his vocals to the style of the song, Quinn was hired instead. Flood, who had previously worked with Quinn's band Bourgie Bourgie, had suggested to Clarke that the singer's voice would be a better match. Released in June 1985, "One Day" reached No. 99 in the UK. By the time of its release, Clarke had already auditioned singer Andy Bell and formed Erasure together, with work on their debut album Wonderland beginning soon after the release of the single.

Speaking to New Musical Express in 1985, Quinn said of the song: "At first I thought the song was a bit too low-key, but the more I hear it the better it sounds. Even after I'd gone in and sung it for the first time, I didn't think too much of it. But it worked out well, so I decided to do the single." Clarke told Number One: "The main reason I wanted to do this was 'cause I'd done nothing for so long and I was starting to get bored. Last year was a miserable year."

== Critical reception ==
Upon release, Chris Heath of Smash Hits described the single as "very good" and commented: "Paul Quinn tries very hard to sing like David Bowie over the same 'ker-plunk ker-plunk' synth backing that Clarke has used since his Depeche Mode and Yazoo days. I just wish we hadn't had to wait for so long." Adrian Thrills of New Musical Express described the song as a "slow, reflective ballad". He noted the "crisp backing track [of] electronic embroidery tinged with a human warmth" and Quinn's "powerful but plaintive" voice.

Anne Lambert of Number One stated: "Paul teamed up with Edwin from Orange Juice last year for the lovely "Pale Blue Eyes" which didn't get anywhere. This song is certainly more commercial and gives Paul a chance to stretch his beautiful voice to the full. Romantic and flowing, it could just be a surprise summer hit." Stuart Husband of Number One described the song as a "slow, stately number". Graham K. Smith of Record Mirror considered the song the "first flop" of Clarke's "brilliant career" and commented: ""One Day" has all the ingredients that made "Never Never" a mega but has suffered serious problems in the preparation and cooking."

== Track listing ==
7" single

1. "One Day" (Clarke/Morgan/McVey) – 3:15
2. "Song For" (Clarke) – 3:21

12" single

1. "One Day (Extension)" – 4:18
2. "Song For (Extension)" – 5:09

CD single (1996 UK release)

1. "One Day" – 3:15
2. "Song For" – 3:21
3. "One Day (Extension)" – 4:18
4. "Song For (Extension)" – 5:09

== Chart performance ==
Chart (1985)	Peak position
UK Independent Singles Chart	7
UK Singles Chart	99

== Personnel ==
- Paul Quinn - vocals
- Vince Clarke - synthesisers
- Flood - producer
- Daniel Miller - assistant producer on "One Day"
- T+CP - sleeve design
