= Paul Quinn (singer) =

Scottish singer

- Birth name: Paul Walter Quinn
- Born: 1959 (age 65–66); Dundee, Scotland
- Genres: Post-punk; pop; new wave
- Occupations: Singer; songwriter
- Years active: 1980–present
- Labels: Postcard; Swamplands; Thirsty Ear
- Formerly of: Jazzateers

Paul Walter Quinn (born 1959) is a Scottish musician who was the lead singer of cult 1980s band Bourgie Bourgie, and also released records with Jazzateers, Vince Clarke and Edwyn Collins and sang on an early track by the French Impressionists.

== Biography ==
Quinn was a classmate of Edwyn Collins between the ages of 11 and 15, and sang backing vocals on "Rip It Up" by Collins' band Orange Juice. After singing with Postcard Records band Jazzateers (contemporaries of Josef K, The French Impressionists and Aztec Camera) he formed Bourgie Bourgie in May 1983 along with former members of his previous band. Bourgie Bourgie were signed by MCA Records and released two singles in 1984, both of which charted in the UK, "Breaking Point" peaking at number 48 and "Careless" at number 96. The group began recording an album with producer Mike Hedges but it remained unreleased when they split up. Quinn then collaborated with Edwyn Collins on a version of The Velvet Underground's "Pale Blue Eyes", released on Postcard Records boss Alan Horne's new Swamplands label, which reached number 72 in the UK in August 1984. In early 1985, Quinn released his first solo single, "Ain't That Always the Way", which again featured Collins but was credited solely to Quinn for contractual reasons, which was also a minor hit, reaching number 98 in the UK. He then collaborated with Vince Clarke on the "One Day" single, which fared similarly.

Quinn returned in 1992 with a new band, The Independent Group, a supergroup containing former members of Orange Juice, Aztec Camera, Lloyd Cole & the Commotions, and The Bluebells. Signed to a revived Postcard Records, they released two albums in 1992 and 1994.

In 1995, Quinn collaborated with Nectarine No. 9 on the Pregnant with Possibilities EP.

Quinn has neither recorded nor made any public appearances for many years. In December 2020, it was announced that a boxset anthology of Quinn's work was to be released in 2021 on a reactivated Postcard Records

== Bourgie Bourgie ==
Bourgie Bourgie comprised Quinn and the following:

- Mick Slaven – guitar
- Keith Band – bass
- Ian Burgoyne – guitar
- Ken McDonald – drums

All were former members of Jazzateers. They released two singles in 1984, both minor hits, and recorded a session for John Peel's BBC Radio 1 show the same year.

== Paul Quinn & the Independent Group ==
The Independent Group featured James Kirk (guitar, of Orange Juice), Blair Cowan (keyboards, from Lloyd Cole and The Commotions), Tony Soave, (drums, of The Silencers) Campbell Owens (bass, of Aztec Camera), Robert Hodgens (guitar, of The Bluebells), and Postcard Records founder Alan Horne. The group's first album The Phantoms & the Archetypes was released in 1992. After a further single, "Stupid Thing", Hodgens was replaced by Mick Slaven (formerly of Jazzeaters and Del Amitri), Steve "Skip" Reid (formerly of Associates), Andy Alston, and Jane Marie O'Brien. A second album, Will I Ever Be Inside of You, was released in 1994. The band performed at the Glasgow Film Theatre, playing songs from the album while clips of films including Midnight Cowboy, The Loveless, Taxi Driver, and Un Chien Andalou played behind them.

== Discography ==
=== with Bourgie Bourgie ===
- "Breaking Point" / "Apres-Ski" (1984), MCA, Cat No: BOU1 – UK #48
- "Careless" / "Change of Attitude" (1984), MCA, Cat No: BOU2 – UK #96

=== with Edwyn Collins ===
- "Pale Blue Eyes" / "Burro" (1984), Swamplands – UK #72
- "Ain't That Always the Way" / "Corrina Corrina" / "Punk Rock Hotel" (1985), Swamplands – UK #98, credited to Paul Quinn

=== with Vince Clarke ===
- "One Day" / "Song For" (1985), Mute, Cat No: TAG1 – UK #99, UK Indie #7

=== as Paul Quinn & The Independent Group ===
==== Albums ====
- The Phantoms & the Archetypes (1992), Postcard – produced by Edwyn Collins, Cat No: DUBH 921
- Will I Ever Be Inside of You (1994), Postcard – Cat No: DUBH 945

==== Singles ====
- "Stupid Thing" / "A Passing Thought" / "Superstar" (1993), Postcard, Cat No: DUBH 933

=== as Paul Quinn & The Nectarine No. 9 ===
- Pregnant with Possibilities EP (1995), Postcard, Cat No: DUBH 952: "Tiger Tiger", "Will I Ever Be Inside of You"

== In popular culture ==
In the satirical 2010 novel Gabriel's Angel by Mark A. Radcliffe, Quinn's "Will I Ever Be Inside Of You" is the song that is playing when one of the characters wakes from a coma.
