= Will I Ever Be Inside of You =

Studio album by Paul Quinn and the Independent Group
- Released: 1994
- Length: 52:30
- Label: Postcard
- Producer: Blair Cowan; Alan Horne

Paul Quinn and the Independent Group chronology
The Phantoms & the Archetypes (1992)	Will I Ever Be Inside of You (1994)

Will I Ever Be Inside of You is the second and final studio album by Scottish band Paul Quinn and the Independent Group, released by Postcard Records in 1994. It was released in the US by Thirsty Ear on 5 August 1996.

== Critical reception ==
Professional ratings
Review scores
Source	Rating
AllMusic	4/5 stars
The Guardian	4/4 stars
NME	8/10

Upon its release, Lawrence Donegan of The Guardian praised the album as "faultless" and considered it "a real renaissance" in comparison to the band's "moderate" 1992 debut The Phantoms & the Archetypes. Inviting readers to "imagine Bowie's Young Americans coloured by Teenie Hodges's guitar work on Al Green's best records", he added, "The star is Quinn, whose deep, rich voice dominates the album, but a special mention should be reserved for guitar player, James Kirk. Truly, a man fit to tend the feet of kings." Mark Luffman of Melody Maker was positive in his review, commenting that it is Quinn's "faith in the power of pop to communicate that enables him to transend the oppressive despair at the heart of this record". He concluded, "If Phantoms was the sound of the Independent Group learning to fly, Will I Ever Be Inside of You is the soud of them looping the loop." Keith Cameron of NME considered the album to be made up of "immaculately consumptive laments for which buddies like Roddy and Edwyn would simply die" and was particularly favourable towards the title track, which he called "the most portentous expression of unrequited love ever conceived" and a "mini-symphony of lovesick madness". He concluded, "If professional misfortune can help inspire such brilliance then perhaps the eternal bridesmaid ain't such a bad thing to be."

Amy Hanson of AllMusic noted how Quinn's "distinctive voice [and] rich deep tones spins out in front of what amounts to a series of interesting, but unobtrusive, backing melodies" and felt that, while the mood is kept "fairly somber", Quinn "often loads [the album] with unexpected dips and twists, ensuring that anyone taking the chance can't settle in and kick back too easily". She concluded, "Sweet and just slightly sinister, this set can't be ignored – it's gorgeous fodder for the older doom and gloom set." In 2003, Uncut published a feature on the album as part of their "All-time Classics: Great albums that have fallen off the critical radar" series. Reviewer Damien Love called it "Quinn's swooning, vampire-soul magnum opus" and added that with the "recklessly ambitious second album, the group scaled Olympus". He also described the title track as "a yearning, languorous but urgent nine-minute symphony" and "an astonishing opening".

== Track listing ==
No.	Title	Writer(s)	Length
1.	"Will I Ever Be Inside of You"	Paul Quinn, Alan Horne, Blair Cowan, Edwyn Collins, Mick Slaven	9:09
2.	"You Have Been Seen"	Quinn, Horne, Andy Alston, Cowan, James Kirk, Slaven, Campbell Owens, Skip Reid	5:37
3.	"Lover, That's You All Over"	Quinn, Horne, Kirk, Slaven, Owens, Reid	7:50
4.	"Mooreeffoc (Misty Blue)"	Bob Montgomery	2:02
5.	"Passing Thought"	Quinn, Collins, Kirk, Horne, Cowan	7:30
6.	"Outre"	Quinn, Horne, Cowan, Kirk, Slaven, Owens, Reid	6:30
7.	"Misty Blue"	Montgomery	2:40
8.	"Stupid Thing"	Quinn, Horne, Kirk, Owens, Cowan, Tony Soave, Robert Hodgens	7:18
9.	"At the End of the Night"	Quinn, Kirk, Horne, Cowan, Owens	4:02
Total length:			52:38

== Personnel ==
Paul Quinn and the Independent Group

- Paul Quinn – vocals
- James Kirk – guitar
- Alan Horne
- Campbell Owens – bass
- Blair Cowan – keyboards
- Mick Slaven – guitar
- Skip Reid – drummer
- Andy Alston – keyboards
- Jane Marie O'Brien – vocals

Production

- Blair Cowan – production
- Alan Horne – production
- Kenny MacDonald – engineering
- Duncan Cowall – mastering

Other

- Alan Horne – sleeve design
- John Main – art director
- Paul Sorley – lighting director
- Kevin Low – photography
- Marion Thomson – costume design
- Geraldine Hanley – production manager
- Jane Carroll – graphics
- Alistair McCallum – graphics
