= Music of Quality and Distinction Volume Three =

2013 compilation album by the British Electric Foundation

Music of Quality and Distinction Volume Three is by now the final album released by the British Electric Foundation, released in 2013. The album took 22 years to complete.

No.	Title	Artist	length
1.	"Every Time I See You I Go Wild"	Kim Wilde	3.52
2.	"Didn't I Blow Your Mind This Time"	Green Gartside	3.57
3.	"Don't Want to Know"	Sarah Jane Morris	4.13
4.	"Picture This"	Kate Jackson	6.38
5.	"Breathing"	Andy Bell	5.25
6.	"It Was a Very Good Year"	Glenn Gregory	4.09
7.	"I Wanna Be Your Dog"	Boy George	3.07
8.	"The Same Love That Made Me Laugh"	David J Roch	5.06
9.	"God Only Knows"	Shingai Shoniwa	2.40
10.	"Make Up"	Boy George	2.54
11.	"Just Walk in My Shoes"	Sandie Shaw	3.02
12.	"The Look of Love"	Polly Scattergood	4.22
13.	"Party Fears Two"	Glenn Gregory	6.33
14.	"Smalltown Boy"	Billie Godfrey	7.40
