= Rip It Up (Orange Juice song) =

Single by Orange Juice

from the album Rip It Up
- B-side: "Snake Charmer"; "A Sad Lament"
- Released: 7 February 1983
- Recorded: Berwick Street Studios, London
- Genre: Funk; jangle pop; synth-pop
- Label: Polydor
- Songwriter: Edwyn Collins
- Producer: Martin Hayles

Orange Juice singles chronology
"I Can't Help Myself" (1982)	"Rip It Up" (1983)	"Flesh of My Flesh" (1983)

"Rip It Up" is a song by Scottish indie pop band Orange Juice, released in 1983 as the second single from their 1982 album of the same name. The song became the band's only UK top 40 success, reaching No. 8 on the chart. "Rip It Up" signalled a departure from the sound of the band's earlier singles, with Chic-influenced guitars and using a synthesiser to create a more disco-oriented sound.

== Recording and influences ==
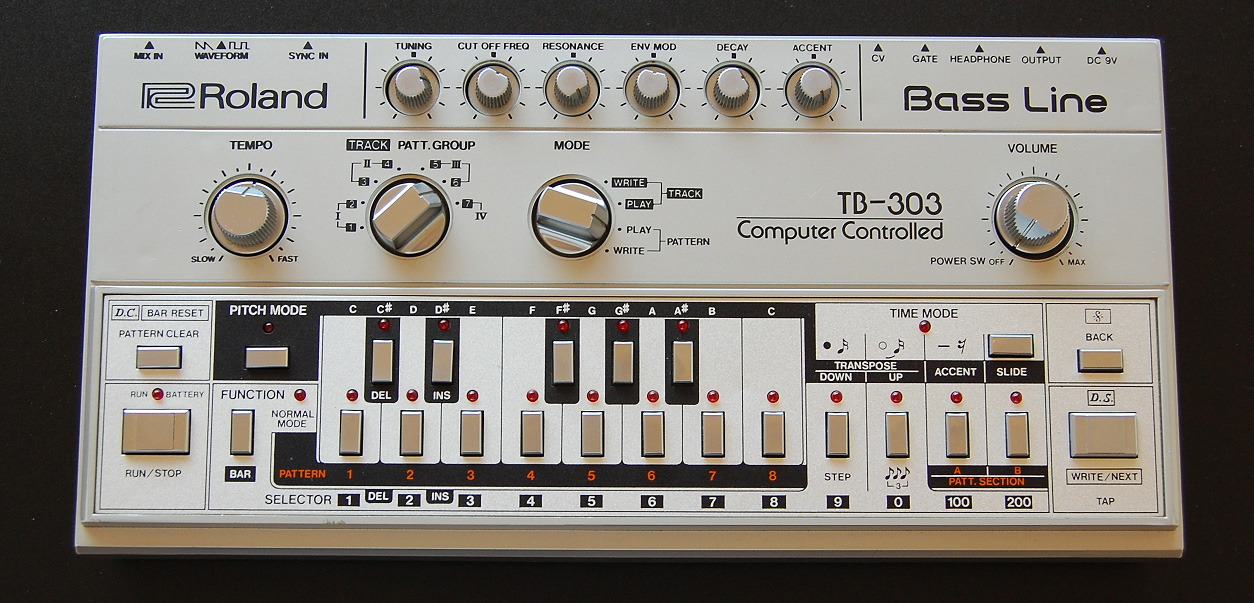
Roland TB-303

The song was recorded as part of the sessions for Orange Juice's second studio album and would go on to become the title track of said album. It marked a departure from their previous guitar-pop based material, instead utilising Chic style guitar-funk and a bubbling Roland TB-303 synthesiser bassline, becoming the first chart single to feature the instrument. The song also quotes two lines of lyrics ("You know me, I'm acting dumb-dumb / You know this scene is very humdrum") and a snatch of the guitar riff from "Boredom", a song by Buzzcocks that featured on their debut Spiral Scratch EP. The riff chimes briefly in, just as Collins namechecks the song in the lyrics claiming that "...and my favourite song is entitled 'Boredom'." Backing vocals on the song were provided by Paul Quinn, the lead singer of fellow Scottish band Bourgie Bourgie, with whom Collins would later record a single in 1984, a cover of the Velvet Underground song "Pale Blue Eyes."

Malcolm Ross said that "Rip It Up" was originally written as "a really throwaway song" that was initially going to be a b-side. Edwyn Collins “By the time we rerecorded "Rip It Up" as a single the said the group had "regained some of the old Postcardian positivism." Collins continued that "We were quite blasé about having a hit when it eventually came. Going on Top Of The Pops, after hankering after it for years, was something that we took in our stride."

== Music video ==
The video opens with the band in a futuristic, but cheaply constructed, control room as they sing, dance and operate various controls. The band then watch themselves on a monitor screen as they walk down a rainy British high street dressed in incongruous, brightly coloured summer clothes. The video then cuts back to the control room, this time with the band playing their instruments superimposed over it, before returning to more scenes of a British city in torrential rain as the band walk around in scuba diving gear. The video finally cuts back to the band playing in a silver foil covered room, before superimposing them over a pile of random photographs.

== Reception ==
Lloyd Bradley reviewed the single for "Rip It Up" in the NME found that Orange Juice had avoided "all known cliches in both music and words" while finding the song "ultimately goes nowhere, it's a bright, refreshing journey."

In 2014, NME ranked it at number 216 in its list of "The 500 Greatest Songs of All Time". It was also included by Pitchfork at number 157 in their list of "The Best 200 Songs of the 1980s".

== UK single release ==
"Rip It Up" was released as a single in the UK in February 1983. The seven inch vinyl version of the single was available in three versions, a double pack including a second seven-inch and a fold out poster, along with two versions of the standard release, initially with a silver injection moulded labels, and then subsequently with paper printed labels. The song was also released on twelve inch vinyl, with extended versions of the title track and B-side. All versions were housed in a paper sleeve depicting a US P-40 Warhawk fighter plane (decorated with eyes and teeth) partially submerged, tail first, in the sea, drawn by Edwyn Collins.

=== Track listing ===
Single 7"
No.	Title	Writer(s)	Length
1.	"Rip It Up"	Edwyn Collins	3:51
2.	"Snake Charmer"	Malcolm Ross	4:43

Double 7"
No.	Title	Writer(s)	Length
1.	"Rip It Up"	Edwyn Collins
2.	"Snake Charmer"	Malcolm Ross
3.	"Love Sick" (Live)	Edwyn Collins
4.	"A Sad Lament"	Edwyn Collins

12"
No.	Title	Writer(s)	Length
1.	"Rip It Up" (Long Version)	Edwyn Collins
2.	"A Sad Lament" (Long Version)	Edwyn Collins

== Chart positions ==
Chart (1983)	Peak position
Ireland (IRMA)	23
UK Singles Chart	8
New Zealand Singles Chart	42
