= The Apples (Scottish band) =

Scottish indie-dance band

The Apples were a Scottish indie-dance band from Edinburgh, Scotland, which formed in the early 1990s. They were signed to Epic Records and consisted of former Win members Ian Stoddart and Willie Perry, with Callum McNair and Samantha Swanson (from the 1980s band, Hey! Elastica). Their only hit single in the United Kingdom was the number 75 chart entry "Eye Wonder", which made the band join the list of 'Least successful chart acts' in The Guinness Book of British Hit Singles (as it stayed on the chart for one week).

== Post-Apples career ==
McNair later went on to join The Bathers, while Stoddart went on to be a member of Aberfeldy, appearing on their 2004 Rough Trade album Young Forever. Ian Stoddart died in June 2020, by which time he was a member of Glasgow-based band MONICA, with Lloyd Herriott, Ariane Jackson, Andrea Marini and former Trembling Bells man, Simon Shaw.

=== MONICA ===
MONICA's debut album, Celebration, was released a couple of months before Stoddart died, on 24 April 2020. It received a 4 star review in The Scotsman newspaper.

== Singles ==
- "Beautiful People" (1991)
- "Eye Wonder" (No. 75 UK – 1991)
- "Stay People Child" (1991)

== Albums ==
- Here is Tomorrow (1991)
