= Rip It Up (Orange Juice album) =

Studio album by Orange Juice
- Released: November 1982
- Studios: Berwick Street, London
- Genres: Post-punk, new wave
- Length: 42:16
- Label: Polydor
- Producer: Martin Hayles

Orange Juice chronology
You Can't Hide Your Love Forever (1982)	Rip It Up (1982)	Texas Fever (1984)

Singles from Rip It Up
- 1. "I Can't Help Myself" Released: 1982 (UK & JP); 2. "A Million Pleading Faces" Released: 1982 (UK Promo); 3. "Rip It Up" Released: 1983; 4. "Flesh of My Flesh" Released: 1983 (UK & IE)

Rip It Up is the second album by Scottish post-punk band Orange Juice, released in 1982. It contains their hit song of the same name, which reached the Top 10.

== Music ==
Rip It Up is considered to be a post-punk release. The title track is described as "one of [the band's] most keyboard-driven new wave-y tunes." The album as a whole is marked by "funk rhythms, angular guitars and catchy melodies." According to Josh Jackson of Paste: "It was New Romanticism with all the softness and glamour removed."

== Critical reception ==
Professional ratings
Review scores
Source	Rating
AllMusic	3.5/5 stars
The Encyclopedia of Popular Music	4/5 stars
The Great Rock Discography	6/10
The Line of Best Fit	8/10
MusicHound Lounge	3/5 stars
Record Mirror	3/5 stars
Smash Hits	8/10
Sounds	1.5/5 stars

In his overview of the bands career in 1983, Adrian Thrills of the NME said the album was "badly received all round." with Thrills himself describing it as a "rather patchy set." Neil Tennant of Smash Hits gave the album an 8 out of 10 and wrote that "no one can accuse them of being twee anymore ... a big step forward which they can be proud of and you can enjoy." Jim Reid of Record Mirror called it "a pleasing patchwork" saying that Collins "simply lacks the power and range to embroider his songs with anything approaching the feeling of sincerity of a real soul singer."

Trouser Press wrote that the album "explores the first album's ingenuousness in greater depth with thought-provoking results... Though young love remains the theme, tension has replaced cuteness." In 2016, Josh Jackson of Paste wrote: "For most people, Scottish band Orange Juice was a one-hit wonder known for the UK Top 10 song ["Rip It Up"] which was one of their most keyboard-driven New Wave-y tunes. But for those who bothered to listen beyond the opening title track, Rip It Up was an overlooked post-punk gem."

== Track listing ==
1. "Rip It Up" – 5:19 (Edwyn Collins)
2. "A Million Pleading Faces" – 3:14 (Zeke Manyika)
3. "Mud in Your Eye" – 3:56 (Collins)
4. "Turn Away" – 3:19 (Malcolm Ross)
5. "Breakfast Time" – 5:10 (Collins)
6. "I Can't Help Myself" – 5:05 (Collins, David McClymont)
7. "Flesh of My Flesh" – 3:15 (Collins)
8. "Louise Louise" – 2:51 (Collins)
9. "Hokoyo" – 5:06 (Collins, McClymont, Ross, Manyika, Zop Cormorant)
10. "Tenterhook" – 5:01 (Collins)

1998 reissue bonus tracks

1. "Tongues Begin to Wag" - 4:14 (Collins, McClymont, Ross, Manyika)
2. "Barbecue" - 4:48 (Collins, McClymont, Ross, Manyika)
3. "Flesh of My Flesh" (7" version) - 3:16 (Collins)

== Personnel ==
Orange Juice

- Edwyn Collins – vocals, guitar, violin
- Malcolm Ross – guitar, vocals, synthesizer, piano, organ
- David McClymont – bass, synthesizer, backing vocals
- Zeke Manyika – drums, vocals, percussion, synthesizer

with:

- Dick Morrissey - saxophone
- Martin Drover - flugelhorn
- Martin Hayles - piano, synthesizer
- Mel Gaynor - percussion
- Louise Waddle - handclaps
- Gavyn Wright - violin
- Paul Quinn - vocals
- Danny Cummings - percussion on "Flesh of My Flesh"

Technical

- Gwyn Mathias - additional engineering
- Orange Juice - sleeve design
- Eric Watson - photography
