= Creeping Bent (record label) =

Record label based in Glasgow, Scotland

Creeping Bent, a.k.a. The Creeping Bent Organisation, is an independent record label set up by Douglas MacIntyre in 1994, based in Glasgow, Scotland. The label has been described as a successor to earlier Scottish indie labels Postcard Records and Fast Product. Creeping Bent was officially launched with an event at Glasgow's Tramway theatre on 12 December 1994 called "A Leap into The Void" in homage to Yves Klein, and featuring film, theatre and pop music. "Frankie Teardrop", a 1995 collaboration between Suicide vocalist Alan Vega and Altered Images drummer Stephen Lironi, was an NME single of the week in 1995. Creeping Bent was chosen by John Peel as the featured label when he curated the 1998 Meltdown Festival at the Royal Festival Hall. Creeping Bent artists recorded 20 sessions for Peel's BBC Radio 1 show. The label celebrated its 20th anniversary in January 2014 with shows featuring Sexual Objects, and the Pop Group playing at Celtic Connections.

Recent years have seen further releases by Port Sulphur, Jazzateers, Transelement, Gareth Sager.

== Artists ==
- Adventures in Stereo
- Appendix Out a.k.a. Alasdair Roberts
- The Fire Engines
- Future Pilot A.K.A., a.k.a. Sushil K. Dade, who has released collaborations with Runaways producer Kim Fowley and writer Alasdair Gray among others
- Vic Godard, formerly of the punk group Subway Sect
- The Nectarine No. 9, featuring former Fire Engines frontman Davy Henderson
- Monica Queen
- Gareth Sager, formerly of The Pop Group
- The Secret Goldfish
- Alan Vega, formerly of the electronic duo Suicide
- Bill Wells & Isobel Campbell's 2002 album Ghost of Yesterday

== See also ==
- List of record labels
- List of independent UK record labels
