= Ostrich Churchyard =

Compilation album by Orange Juice
- Released: 14 September 1992
- Recorded: October 1980, May 1981
- Venue: Hellfire Club, Glasgow, Scotland
- Studio: BBC Maida Vale, London, England
- Genre: Post-punk
- Length: 48:36
- Label: Postcard (Polydor Japan)
- Producer: Davy Henderson, Dave Anderson, Edwyn Collins, John Sparrow

Orange Juice chronology
The Orange Juice (1984)	Ostrich Churchyard (1992)	The Heather's on Fire (1993)

Ostrich Churchyard is an album by Orange Juice, released on CD in 1992. Tracks 1 to 12 were recorded at the Hellfire Club (a Glasgow studio and rehearsal room) over a few days in May 1981. The remaining tracks were from a John Peel session recording of October 1980.

== Track listing ==
All tracks composed by Edwyn Collins; except where indicated

1. "Louise Louise" – 2:50
2. "Three Cheers for Our Side" (James Kirk) – 2:52
3. "In a Nutshell" – 4:06
4. "Satellite City" – 2:42
5. "Consolation Prize" – 3:10
6. "Holiday Hymn" (Vic Godard) – 3:00
7. "Intuition Told Me (Part 1)" – 1:14
8. "Intuition Told Me (Part 2)" – 3:22
9. "Wan Light" (James Kirk) – 2:30
10. "Dying Day" – 3:09
11. "Texas Fever" – 1:44
12. "Tender Object" – 4:40
13. "Falling and Laughing" – 3:23 (23-10-80 Peel Session)
14. "Love Sick" – 2:23 (23-10-80 Peel Session)
15. "Poor Old Soul" – 2:34 (23-10-80 Peel Session)
16. "You Old Eccentric" (James Kirk) – 2:21 (23-10-80 Peel Session)
17. "Wan Light" (James Kirk) (19-1-81 Radio 1 Session, Japanese release only) – 2:29
