= Lubricate Your Living Room =

Studio album by The Fire Engines
- Released: January 1981
- Recorded: 5 October 1980
- Genre: Post-punk
- Label: Pop Aural
- Producer: Bob Last

The Fire Engines chronology
Lubricate Your Living Room (1981)	Aufgeladen und Bereit fur Action und Spass (1981)

Lubricate Your Living Room (subtitled on some editions as Background Music for Now People) is the debut studio album by Scottish post-punk band the Fire Engines. It was released in 1981, through record label Pop Aural.

== Background ==
The album was conceived by Bob Last, with the Fire Enginers "playing the role of willing accomplice" in the words of Innes Reekie of Louder Than War, who describe the album's concept as "music to go out to, to put you in the mood for 'action and fun'." Indeed, the album's subtitle is Background Music for Action People.

Several members of the band, their manager Angus Whyte and several of their art school friends (including Paul Steen, who helped the band issue their first single), regularly visited Last's Edinburgh flat and became regulars at the nearby Tap o'Lauriston pub. It was in the pub and at Last's flat that the gathered people exchanged ideas which ultimately provided the impetus for a chain of Fire Engines releases which were released in sleeves featuring household objects and titled in parody to the langue of modern advertising, namely Lubricate Your Living Room and "Get Up and Use Me" and "New Things in Cartoons" singles.

== Music ==
Containing eight tracks, Lubricate Your Living Room is a discordant, un-melodic, harsh and rhythmic album, combining angular funk guitar riffs and funk rhythms with manic repetition. The album is almost entirely instrumental, with most tracks containing no vocals, and those that do, such as "Discord", only featuring Henderson's yelps and screams buried under a "barbed-wire tangle" of guitar, bass and drums. James Robert of Rough Guides described the album's musical style as "noise-funk," while Reekie described the music as "improvised pieces of music/muzak. Speaking to the NME in 1981, Davy Henderson said:

"It’s not actual songs, it's just something else to do, it's not some big important thing. It's just a record, it's to be fucking played. It's not like this is our first LP and we mean this kind of thing. It's none of that. It's not our LP. It's an amalgamation between Pop:Aural and Codex Communication using the Fire Engines, and it's just that, and it's brilliant."

James felt that the album combined the "manic repetition, angularity and speed drive" of the New York City scene from several years earlier, as opposed to the British punk scene. Reekie, meanwhile, felt the album had more in common with contemporaneous, instrumental dub albums from Kingston, Jamaica, and the instrumental, extended disco remixes that were emerging from nightclubs including Danceteria in Downtown Manhattan, than it did any other music at the time.

Opening track "Plastic Gift" features an intro of guitar notes which phase in and out of conventional guitar tunings, a sound which breaks the track's bass and drums foundation.

"Discord", the longest track on the album, is based around a riff which progresses through the unusual combination of B-natural, E-flat and F-sharp notes, which are repeatedly played in a rigidly defined cadence that makes them danceable.

"Hungry Beat" was described by Kelly as "mostly an extended argument between drums and bass," with snapping snare drums, thundering bass and screeching, wailing guitars.

== Reception ==
Professional ratings
Review scores
Source	Rating
AllMusic	4/5 stars
Encyclopedia of Popular Music	3/5 stars

Colin Larkin called the album a "barrage of awkward, angular funk guitar riffs."

Reekie felt that, upon release, the album "sounded like nothing else; Fire Engines were then occupying a completely different hemisphere to that of their contemporaries." Robert James of Rough Guides wrote that the album "was discordant, harsh, rhythmic noise-funk" and "against the grain."

== Track listing ==
Side A
No.	Title	Length
1.	"Plastic Gift"	1:02
2.	"Get Up & Use Me"	2:56
3.	"Sympathetic Anaesthetic"	3:12
4.	"Discord"	6:51

Side B
No.	Title	Length
1.	"New Thing in Cartons"	2:55
2.	"Hungry Beat"	4:31
3.	"Lubricate Your Living Room Pt.1"	4:34
4.	"Lubricate Your Living Room Pt.2"	2:32

== Personnel ==
Fire Engines

- Graham Main – bass guitar
- Russell Burn – drums
- Murray Slade – guitar
- David Henderson – guitar, vocals

Technical

- Bob Last – production
