= Davy Henderson =

Scottish singer and guitarist

- Birth name: David Henderson
- Born: 1962
- Origin: Edinburgh, Scotland
- Genres: Post-punk, pop, indie rock
- Instrument(s): Guitar, vocals
- Years active: Late 1970s–present
- Labels: Pop:Aural, Postcard, Creeping Bent

David Alexander "Davy" Henderson (born 1962) is a Scottish singer and guitarist whose career began in the 1970s. He is best known for his work with The Fire Engines, Win, The Nectarine No. 9, and more recently The Sexual Objects and Port Sulphur.

== Biography ==
Henderson was a member of The Dirty Reds in the late 1970s, and formed The Fire Engines in 1979. The band released an album and three singles before splitting up at the end of 1981.

Henderson then formed Heartbeat with Hillary Morrison and in the mid-1980s reunited with Fire Engines drummer Russell Burn in Win, whose profile was raised by "You've Got the Power", which featured in a McEwan's lager television advertisement. "You've Got the Power" charted in the UK Singles Chart (in the 'next 25' section) at number 95, but reportedly sold enough copies to be a hit. Henderson claimed that many copies of the record sold were excluded by Gallup from their chart data, as they thought the single was being illegally hyped in stores around Scotland. However they charted with a couple of hits in the UK charts with the single "Super Popoid Groove" reaching number 63 and album Uh! Tears Baby (a Trash Icon) peaking at number 51 in 1987. After a second album in 1989, Win split up. Henderson worked with Burn again on A Dali Surprise, an album by Burn's Pie Finger project, before forming The Nectarine No. 9, the band releasing eight albums between 1992 and 2004.

In 2004 The Fire Engines reunited for a few live shows. Henderson went on to form The Sexual Objects.

Featured in the 2015 documentary Big Gold Dream directed by Grant McPhee and the 2022 book Hungry Beat by Douglas MacIntyre and Grant McPhee with Neil Cooper
