= The Orange Juice =

Studio album by Orange Juice
- Released: November 1984
- Genre: Post-punk
- Label: Polydor
- Producer: Dennis Bovell, Will Gosling, Phil Thornalley

Orange Juice chronology
Texas Fever (1984)	The Orange Juice (1984)	Ostrich Churchyard (1992)

Professional ratings
Review scores
Source	Rating
AllMusic	4/5 stars
Smash Hits	9/10

The Orange Juice is the third and final studio album by Scottish post-punk band Orange Juice. It was released in 1984. The title was a tribute to the Velvet Underground's eponymous third album.

The album was released with free 12" single versions of several tracks on the cassette version, and it sold mostly in this format. The album was re-released on CD in 1998 and again in 2014.

Edwyn Collins used to dedicate the song "I Guess I'm Just a Little Too Sensitive" to Morrissey on the tour promoting this album.

== Track listing ==
All tracks composed by Edwyn Collins

1. "Lean Period"
2. "I Guess I'm Just a Little Too Sensitive"
3. "Burning Desire"
4. "Scaremonger"
5. "The Artisans"
6. "What Presence?!"
7. "Out for the Count"
8. "Get While the Gettings Good"
9. "All That Ever Mattered"
10. "Salmon Fishing in New York"

Cassette bonus tracks

1. "I Can't Help Myself (12" Mix)" (aka 'Long Version' from "I Can't Help Myself" 12")
2. "Rip It Up (12" Mix)" (aka 'Punk Club Version' from "Rip It Up" 12")
3. "Love Sick (12" Mix)" (aka 'Live' version from "Rip It Up" 2x7", which is not actually a live performance)
4. "Flesh of My Flesh (12" Mix)" (aka 'Long Version' from "Flesh of My Flesh" 12")
5. "Out for the Count (12" Mix)" (from "Bridge" 12")
6. "What Presence?! (12" Mix)" (from "What Presence?!" 12")
7. "Lean Period (12" Mix)" (aka 'Extended Version' from "Lean Period" 12")

== Personnel ==
Orange Juice

- Edwyn Collins — lead vocals; guitar (tracks 3–9), synthesizer (track 1), rhythm guitar (track 2), lead guitar (track 10)
- Zeke Manyika – drums; backing vocals (tracks 3, 8)

with:

- Dennis Bovell – keyboards (track 1), vocals (track 1), piano (tracks 2, 4, 7, 9), organ (tracks 2, 5, 7), rhythm guitar (track 2), synthesizer (track 4), Emulator (track 4), lead guitar (track 9)
- Johnny Britton – guitar (tracks 3, 8), backing vocals (track 3), rhythm guitar (track 10)
- Delipse — organ (track 8)
- Frank Want — piano (track 10)
- Clare Kenny – bass (tracks 1–8, 10), backing vocals (track 3)
- Paul Heard — bass (track 9)
