= The Heather's on Fire =

Compilation album by Orange Juice
- Released: 1993
- Recorded: Scotland
- Genre: Post-punk
- Length: 38:15
- Label: Postcard
- Producer: Various

Orange Juice chronology
Ostrich Churchyard (1992)	The Heather's on Fire (1993)	The Glasgow School (2005)

The Heather's on Fire is a singles compilation by Orange Juice, released in 1993.

== Track listing ==
1. "Falling and Laughing" – 4:00
2. "Moscow" – 2:01
3. "Moscow Olympics" – 2:07
4. "Blue Boy" – 2:53
5. "Love Sick" – 2:27
6. "Simply Thrilled Honey" – 2:43
7. "Breakfast Time" – 1:56
8. "Poor Old Soul" – 2:29
9. "Poor Old Soul Pt 2" – 2:36
10. "Felicity" (09-01-81 Radio 1 Mike Read Session) – 2:33
11. "Upwards and Onwards" (09-01-81 Radio 1 Mike Read Session) – 2:22
12. "Dying Day" (04-08-81 Peel Session) – 3:10
13. "Holiday Hymn" (04-08-81 Peel Session) – 3:17
14. "Who Are the Mystery Girls?" by the NuSonics (February 1977) – 3:34

[Note: Japanese Version has "Three Cheers" (04-08-81 Peel Session) as track 14 instead.]
