= British Electric Foundation =

British band and music production company

B.E.F. (British Electric Foundation) is a band/production company formed by former Human League members Martyn Ware and Ian Craig Marsh which became largely eclipsed by its best-known project, Heaven 17 (with lead vocalist Glenn Gregory).

== History ==
Ware and Marsh's first release as B.E.F. in 1981, a collection of instrumentals entitled Music for Stowaways, was initially available only on cassette and was inspired by the appearance of the first Sony Walkman (at first marketed in the UK as the Sony Stowaway). There was also a vinyl release, Music for Listening To, mainly targeted for export sales, which was slightly truncated (though with the addition of a track not found on the cassette). In the late 1990s, a CD release with this title contained the complete contents from both versions.

In 1982, with Heaven 17 already established with Glenn Gregory as the lead vocalist, B.E.F. released an album entitled Music of Quality and Distinction Volume One on Virgin Records, which involved other artists covering classic songs. However, as this album came out before the 'age of the featured artist', the record was classed as a 'Various Artists' compilation, similar to albums released at the time by Ronco or K-Tel, and not a record by the British Electric Foundation, (so its number 25 placing in the UK top 100 albums chart is seen as a hit for Virgin Records and not the B.E.F. or BEF).

The album's production was mainly in the Heaven 17/ B.E.F. style (i.e. synthesisers and LinnDrums) and featured Glenn Gregory covering Jimmy Webb's "Wichita Lineman" (made famous in a version recorded by country star Glen Campbell) and Lou Reed's "Perfect Day". This B.E.F.'s album also featured covers by Billy Mackenzie ("The Secret Life of Arabia" and "It's Over"), Paul Jones ("There's a Ghost in My House"), Paula Yates ("These Boots Are Made for Walkin'"), Gary Glitter ("Suspicious Minds"), Bernie Nolan ("You Keep Me Hangin' On"), as well as "Anyone Who Had a Heart" by Sandie Shaw (a recording which was released as a single that charted at number 71 in Australia), and "Ball of Confusion" (a recording of the Whitfield and Strong song by Tina Turner that drew the attention of Capitol Records, resulting in Turner being signed by the label. Her next single "Let's Stay Together" would be co-produced by Ware, and peaked at number six on the UK Singles Chart, making the US top 20 also).

It was not until 1991 that a second volume appeared, with the album this time being handled by Ten Records through AVL (Associated Virgin Labels Limited) rather than by the main unit of Virgin Records. Music of Quality and Distinction Volume Two again featured Tina Turner (singing "A Change Is Gonna Come") and Billy Mackenzie (singing "Free"), whilst B.E.F.'s version of "Family Affair" gave them and singer Lalah Hathaway a top 40 hit on the UK Singles Chart (this time credited to 'BEF featuring Lalah Hathaway'). Scritti Politti's Green Gartside was another guest on the album, performing "I Don't Know Why I Love You", a track recorded in the same set of sessions that included Scritti Politti's pop-reggae version of "She's a Woman" (featuring Shabba Ranks), a recording which became a top 20 chart hit early in 1991.

Dark was released 27 May 2013, with Ware explaining the album would consist of

"Very dark versions of tunes that have to be of a certain type. Basically it's dark reinterpretations, primarily looking at things differently from a lyrical point of view. It's almost like soundscape stuff, in much the same way as "You've Lost That Loving Feeling" on "Reproduction" was kind of like a soundscape."

At a Sheffield DocFest screening of the documentary Heaven 17: The Last Temptation on 12 June 2026, Ware announced the upcoming Music of Quality and Distinction Volume Four. He said there are 24 artists performing 27 songs, including a new song with Philip Oakey called “Find Her” which is their first collaboration since Ware left The Human League in October 1980.

== First live performance ==
In March 2007, B.E.F. made their first live performance, as part of the line-up for the Tribute to Billy MacKenzie Concert held at Shepherds Bush Empire, London, in memory of their three-time guest vocalist, and in aid of Sound Seekers. The B.E.F. line-up consisted of Martyn Ware on keyboards, a guitarist/keyboardist and a bassist, with Glenn Gregory and Billie Godfrey, Heaven 17's female vocalist.

Setlist:

- The aforementioned "Free"
- Heaven 17's "Let Me Go" (Gregory revealing that it was MacKenzie's favourite Heaven 17 track)
- A version of "Temptation" similar to the original demo, with guest vocalist Claudia Brücken (who was present with two other acts: Onetwo and Claudia Brücken/Andrew Poppy)
- David Bowie's "Drive-In Saturday" (another MacKenzie favourite)
- The Associates' "Party Fears Two" in a slower/stripped-down version.

Following this concert, the stripped-down cover of "Party Fears Two" was recorded in studio and was featured on Heaven 17's 2008 album Naked as Advertised.

== Discography ==
Year	Album	UK	Catalogue	Label	Notes
1981	Music for Listening To	-	BEF 1	B.E.F./Virgin Records	Vinyl L.P. album released by Virgin UK mainly for export to other countries, featuring selected tracks from the Music for Stowaways cassette (TCV 2888) plus exclusive track "A Baby Called Billy"
1981	Music for Stowaways	-	TCV 2888	B.E.F./Virgin Records	Cassette only release (limited number edition of 10,000 copies)
1982	B.E.F.* Presents Sandie Shaw - Anyone Who Had a Heart	-	VS 487	-	Vinyl 7"
1982	B.E.F.* featuring Tina Turner - Ball of Confusion	-	VS 500	-	Vinyl 7"
1982	Music of Quality and Distinction Volume One	25	V 2219	B.E.F./Virgin Records	listed as a 'Various Artists' compilation album on the UK Top 100 albums chart
1982	Music of Quality and Distinction Volume One	-	VV 2219	-	Vinyl 5 x 7" singles
1991	BEF featuring Lalah Hathaway - Family Affair	37	TENX 369	Ten Records/AVL	Vinyl 12"
1991	Music of Quality and Distinction Volume Two	-	-	B.E.F./Ten Records/AVL	-
1991	BEF Featuring Billy MacKenzie – Free	-	TEN 369	Ten Records/AVL	Vinyl 7"
2011	British Electric Foundation: 1981-2011	-	-	B.E.F./Virgin Records	Box set including Vols 1 & 2, Music For Stowaways, "A Baby Called Billy" and tracks from Dark
2013	Music of Quality and Distinction Volume Three: Dark	-	-	-	Standard CD and iTunes releases, plus 2-disc limited edition CD release autographed by Ware
