= The Fire Engines =

Scottish post-punk band

Fire Engines
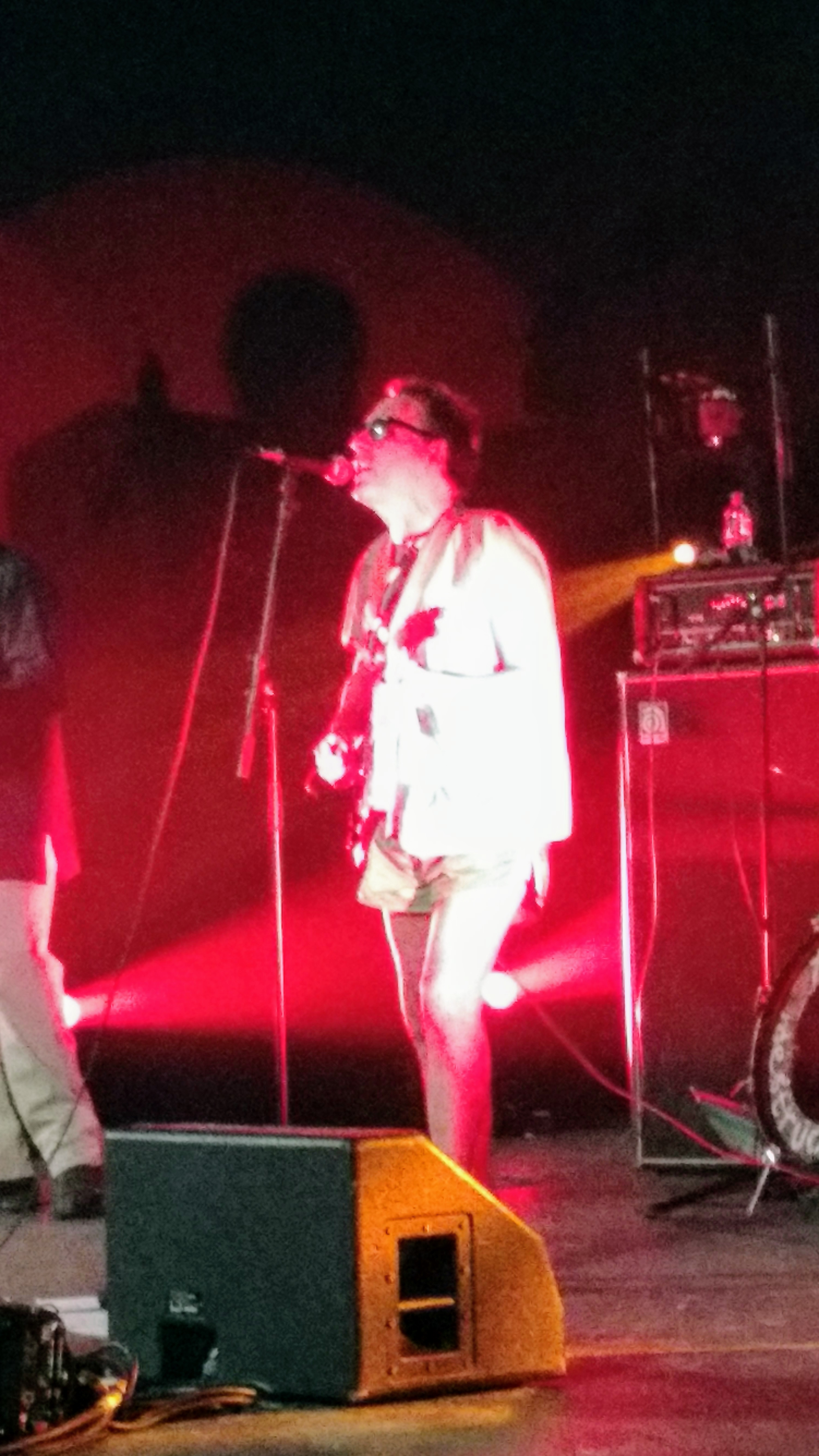
- Fire Engines Leith Theatre August 2017

Background information
- Origin: Edinburgh, Scotland
- Genres: Post-punk
- Years active: 1979–1981, 2004–2006
- Label: Pop:Aural
- Members: Davy Henderson; Murray Slade; Graham Main; Russell Burn

The Fire Engines were a post-punk band from Edinburgh, Scotland. They were initially active between 1979 and 1981. Their first single was the "Get Up And Use Me" / "Everything's Roses", released on the Codex Communications label in 1980, which was given 'Single of the Week' in both NME and Sounds. The band signed to Fast Product and issued further singles and a largely instrumental album, Lubricate Your Living Room (1981) on Fast subsidiary Pop:Aural.

They reformed for concerts between 2004 and 2006, and again in 2017. The Fire Engines were an influence on many bands that followed, including Franz Ferdinand and The Rapture, with Meat Whiplash and The Candyskins both taking their names from Fire Engines songs.

== History ==
The Fire Engines comprise David (Davy) Henderson (vocals/guitar), Murray Slade (guitar), Graham Main (bass), and Russell Burn (drums). The band name was inspired by a 13th Floor Elevators song. Henderson, Main, and Burn had previously been members of The Dirty Reds, along with Russell Burn's brother Tam Dean Burn, while Slade had played in Station Six. The Fire Engines' debut release was the "Get Up And Use Me" / "Everything's Roses" single, released on manager Angus Groovy's Codex Communications label in 1980; The band had recorded their entire set twice in a Fife bungalow with producer Wilf Smarties, at a cost of £46, with these two tracks selected for release.

"Get Up and Use Me" was given 'Single of the Week' in both NME and Sounds. The band's live shows rarely lasted longer than twenty minutes – Henderson said of the early live shows: "We played to our strengths which were minimal, but somehow, as a band, it worked. We never played chords and Russell didn’t use cymbals or hi-hats. It was very violent although no-one got hurt. Pure aggression, attitude and hate was what it was." The band were offered a deal by Postcard Records, but opted for Bob Last's Fast Product label. Further singles followed and a largely instrumental album, Lubricate Your Living Room (subtitled 'Background Music for Action People!'), in 1981, released on Fast subsidiary Pop:Aural. The band recorded two sessions for John Peel's BBC Radio 1 show, the first in February 1981 featuring a cover version of Heaven 17's "(We Don't Need This) Fascist Groove Thang", and a second in November that year. Their most successful single was "Candy Skin", released in 1981, but after the follow-up, "Big Gold Dream" failed to repeat its success, the band split up on 31 December 1981.

Henderson formed the short-lived Heartbeat with Bob Last's partner Hillary Morrison, the band's only release a track on an NME compilation cassette. Burn rejoined The Dirty Reds. Henderson and Burn went on to form Win with Ian Stoddart (formerly of Everest the Hard Way) in the mid-1980s, the band continuing until 1989. Henderson and Burn then worked together on Burn's Pie Finger project, releasing an album on Creation Records in 1992. Henderson then formed The Nectarine No. 9, which continued from the early 1990s until 2004.

== Reformation ==
In 2004, the Fire Engines reformed to support The Magic Band at The Liquid Room in Edinburgh, and released a limited edition collaboration single with Franz Ferdinand; The seven-inch single contained a Franz Ferdinand cover of the Fire Engines song "Get Up and Use Me" with Fire Engines covering Franz Ferdinand's "Jacqueline". The band continued to play occasional concerts until 2006. On 2 October 2007, the Acute label issued Hungry Beat, a collection of the band's original studio recordings, making them available for the first time on CD in the US.

In the late 2000s, Henderson formed The Sexual Objects, featuring Ian Holford (drums), Simon Smeeton (guitar) and Douglas McIntyre (bass). Graham Wann later joined as guitarist. The band released a single on the Creeping Bent label in 2007, two singles through a German label in 2008 and one more in 2009. Their debut album, Cucumber, was released in 2010, partially produced by Boards of Canada (who produced the third single). It was released on vinyl in 2011.

In August 2017 the band reformed again to play a benefit for Leith Theatre along with Irvine Welsh and Ewen Bremner.

== Discography ==
=== Albums ===
Lubricate Your Living Room (1981) - UK Indie #4

=== Compilations ===
- Aufgeladen und Bereit fur Action und Spass (1981)
- Fond (1992)
- Codex Teenage Premonition (2005)
- Hungry Beat (2007)
- Chrome Dawns (2024)

=== Singles ===
- "Get Up and Use Me" / "Everythings Roses" (1980), Codex Communications - UK Indie #9
- "Candyskin" / "Meat Whiplash" (1981), Pop:Aural - UK Indie #7
- "Big Gold Dream" / "New Thing in Cartons" / "Sympathetic Anaesthetic" (1981), Pop:Aural - UK Indie #15
- "Discord" (2006), Domino ¹

¹ from John Peel session tracks "Discord" and "Candyskin"

== Legacy and influence ==
The history of The Fire Engines from 1979 to 1981 is covered in 2015 documentary film Big Gold Dream, which takes its name from the band's final release on the Pop:Aural label.

The Fire Engines were an influence on many bands that followed, including Franz Ferdinand and The Rapture, with Meat Whiplash and The Candyskins both taking their names from Fire Engines songs.
