= Zeke Manyika =

Zimbabwean musician

Zeke Manyika (born 23 February 1955 in the Federation of Rhodesia and Nyasaland) is a drummer, vocalist and songwriter.

== Career ==
Manyika was born in Zimbabwe, but has lived in Britain for most of his life. From 1982 to 1984, he was a member of the Scottish jangle pop band Orange Juice, and contributed to their biggest hit single, "Rip It Up". He can also be heard playing drums on singles by the Style Council such as "Speak Like a Child" and "A Solid Bond in Your Heart". He also contributed to several albums by The The including Soul Mining (1983), Infected (1986) and Dusk (1993).

He was enlisted by Kate Bush in 1984 to play drums on "Running Up That Hill", but his percussion track was not included on the final version.

Manyika's solo albums to date include Call and Response released by Polydor and Mastercrime, released in 1989. The music video for his single "Bible Belt" was filmed in Mozambique and won the Golden Circle Award.

Manyika is mentioned several times in The Guinness Who's Who of Indie and New Wave, edited by Colin Larkin, and published in 1992: Manyika is described as providing "organic backing" to live extravaganzas organised by the UK band Botany 500. The book also mentioned that he plays drums on Hope and Despair, the debut solo studio album by Edwyn Collins (released in 1989 on Demon Records). Manyika also did backing vocals, percussion, and toured with Paul Weller (released on Go! Discs in 1992).

Zeke also worked with Faze Action. He supplied vocals for "Kariba", "Got to Find a Away" and "To Love Is to Grow" on their 1999 LP Moving Cities, "Echoes of Your Mind" taken from their 2014 LP Body of One.
