= You Can't Hide Your Love Forever =

Studio album by Orange Juice
- Released: February 1982
- Studios: Regents Park, London
- Genres: Post-punk, indie pop
- Length: 38:30
- Label: Polydor
- Producer: Adam Kidron

Orange Juice chronology
You Can't Hide Your Love Forever (1982)	Rip It Up (1982)

Singles from You Can't Hide Your Love Forever
- 1. "L.O.V.E. Love" Released: 1981 (UK, NL & NZ); 2. "Felicity" Released: 1982 (UK & ES)

Professional ratings
Review scores
Source	Rating
AllMusic	4/5 stars
The Encyclopedia of Popular Music	4/5 stars
Smash Hits	8/10
Sounds	2/5 stars

You Can't Hide Your Love Forever is the debut album by Scottish post-punk band Orange Juice, released in 1982 by Polydor. The title was derived from a line in the song "Hi Dear," by Jonathan Richman & the Modern Lovers. It was re-released by Domino in 2014.

== Track listing ==
All tracks composed by Edwyn Collins, except where indicated.

1. "Falling and Laughing" – 3:51
2. "Untitled Melody" – 2:04
3. "Wan Light" (James Kirk) – 2:23
4. "Tender Object" – 4:25
5. "Dying Day" – 3:00
6. "L.O.V.E. Love" (Al Green, Mabon "Teenie" Hodges, Willie Mitchell) – 3:32
7. "Intuition Told Me (Part 1)" – 1:09
8. "Upwards and Onwards" – 2:27
9. "Satellite City" – 2:43
10. "Three Cheers for Our Side" (James Kirk) – 2:50
11. "Consolation Prize" – 2:50
12. "Felicity" (James Kirk) – 2:34
13. "In a Nutshell" – 4:15

== Personnel ==
Orange Juice

- Edwyn Collins – guitar, vocals
- James Kirk – guitar, vocals
- David McClymont – bass guitar
- Steven Daly – drums, percussion

with:

- Michael McEvoy – keyboards
- Esther Byrd, Jackie Challenor, Lorenza Johnson – background vocals

Technical

- Adam Kidron – producer; assisted by Orange Juice
- Phil Bodger – engineer
- Steve Bush – sleeve design
- Jill Furmanovsky – cover photography
