= Falling and Laughing =

Single by Orange Juice
- A-side: "Falling and Laughing"
- B-side: "Moscow Olympics/Moscow"
- Released: February 1980
- Recorded: December 1979
- Genre: Post-punk
- Label: Postcard Records
- Songwriter(s): Edwyn Collins
- Producer(s): Orange Juice

Orange Juice singles chronology
"Falling and Laughing" (1980)	"Blue Boy" (1980)

"Falling and Laughing" is the debut single by Scottish post-punk band Orange Juice. It was the first single released by the independent rock label Postcard Records. "Falling and Laughing" marked a new shift of the post-punk sound in general by using themes that were not normally used in the genre, such as love and innocence. It also had a brighter sound, contrasting with the music that their contemporaries (including Joy Division and Echo & the Bunnymen) were making at the time, while maintaining its roots in the experimentalism of the genre.

A re-recording of the song appears on the band's 1982 debut album You Can't Hide Your Love Forever.

The first 963 copies came with a free flexi-disc, containing an early version of "Felicity", a song written by James Kirk and later covered by the Wedding Present.

== Track listing ==
1. "Falling and Laughing" – (4:00)
2. "Moscow" – (2:01)
3. "Moscow Olympics" – (2:07)
