= Orange Juice (band) =

Scottish jangle pop band

- Origin: Bearsden, Dunbartonshire, Scotland
- Genres: Post-punk; new wave; jangle pop; indie pop
- Years active: 1979–1985; 2008
- Labels: Postcard; Polydor; Domino; AED
- Past members: Edwyn Collins; James Kirk; David McClymont; Steven Daly; Chris Gordon; Malcolm Ross; Zeke Manyika; Clare Kenny; Johnny Britten; Paul Heard; Steve Skinner

Orange Juice were a Scottish jangle pop band founded in the Glasgow suburb of Bearsden in 1976. Initially known as the Nu-Sonics, they changed their name to Orange Juice in 1979, and took inspiration from contemporary punk bands including Subway Sect, Television, and Buzzcocks and 1960s acts such as the Byrds and the Velvet Underground. Musically, the band brought together styles and genres that often appeared incongruous, for example, country, disco and punk. Though their line-up changed numerous times, lead singer and guitarist Edwyn Collins was a constant presence and the 'face' of the band.

The band released their first singles in the early 1980s on the independent Postcard Records label founded by Collins and Alan Horne. Along with labelmates Josef K and Aztec Camera, Orange Juice's 'neo acoustic', jangly guitar sound (as evident in singles including "Blue Boy" and "Simply Thrilled Honey") came to define the "Postcard Sound" that would directly influence acts as diverse as the Bluebells, Haircut One Hundred and the Smiths.

== History ==
=== Origins: The Nu Sonics ===
Orange Juice had their origin in the Nu Sonics, formed by Edwyn Collins with college friend Alan Duncan (on bass) in 1976: the band was named after the affordable Burns nu-sonic guitar used by Collins, who later recalled buying the instrument for £20 at age 16 and practising it for years.

Two students in the year below Collins – Steven Daly and James Kirk, previously in punk band, The Machetes – were drafted into the band in 1977, with a fifth member, Jeff Taylor, playing drums. A first gig was held in the Silver Thread in Paisley in November 1977, with Daly on lead vocals. Daly subsequently shifted to drums, and further local gigs followed as a four-piece. One gig supporting Steel Pulse at Satellite City in January 1978, alongside Johnny and the Self-Abusers, later to be known as Simple Minds was attended by Alan Horne who would soon become strongly involved in the group's career. Duncan left the band after a gig at Hardgate Town Hall, leaving the remaining members to search for a new bass player.

=== The Postcard years ===
Shortly after Duncan's departure, one of Collins' colleagues in the Glasgow Parks Department, David McClymont, joined the band on bass, and the band was rechristened as Orange Juice. By this stage, the band had moved into the orbit of Alan Horne and the crowd that dropped in and out of his second floor flat (2/R) on 185 West Princes Street, Glasgow. Collins recalls meeting Horne mocked his appearance when they first met at a Bowie gig.

Collins, Kirk, McClymont and Daly's first gig as Orange Juice occurred in April 1979 in the Glasgow School of Art refectory. At another early gig at Teviot Row House at the University of Edinburgh was recorded by Malcolm Ross of Josef K, and one track from this (Kirk's "Felicity") was pressed as a flexi-disc to be distributed with a planned fanzine to be called 'Strawberry Switchblade', a name that later inspired and was adopted for a band formed by friends of the group. Horne planned the fanzine with Collins in 1979 primarily as a conduit to release Orange Juice's music. The fanzine never appeared, though some copies of the flexi were given away in the Ten Commandments fanzine run by Robert Hodgens (of the Bluebells).

Daly left shortly after the Teviot Row gig, joining local punk act Fun 4. Daly was replaced in Orange Juice by Chris Gordon on drums, but was persuaded back to record the band's debut single "Falling and Laughing" for what became christened Postcard Records after Gordon suffered from stage fright at a number of gigs. The debut single was recorded in December 1979 in Strathaven, with Malcolm Ross co-producing and adding guitar to both the A-side and the playful and instrumental B-side "Moscow", the latter recorded as a tentative 'theme tune' for the coming 1980 Moscow Olympics. Collins recalls that the single was recorded in eight hours in a small 8-track studio in Paisley and attributed its slightly out of tune sound to the band's inability to afford a guitar tuner.

Fewer than 1,000 copies of "Falling and Laughing" were pressed, and most included copies of the "Felicity" flexi: 200 also included a postcard by the band. The wrap-round cover and amateur packaging established Postcard's home-spun aesthetic, with the label's "Sound of Young Scotland" tagline marking it out as something of a reaction to much of the seriousness and angst of post-punk. Yet despite modest beginnings, the label was intended to be a commercial proposition. Horne suggest that the aim was to cut out the majors labels while reaching the charts. Collins concurred and stated that the label wanted a young, popular audience rather than remaining a trendy independent label.

Released in February 1980, "Falling and Laughing" was Postcard's signature tune: lyrically and musically, it celebrated the innocence of youth and was very much at odds with much contemporary independent music, combining a disco bass-line purloined from an ELO song with jangly guitars reminiscent of the Velvet Underground. Gaining appreciative reviews in the music press, the single was never re-issued, making it among the most sought after seven-inches of the post-punk era, copies with postcard and flexi selling for well in excess of £500.

"Falling and Laughing" immediately marked out Postcard Records as a label to watch, and subsequent releases by Josef K and Aztec Camera consolidated its reputation as being at the cutting-edge of a new wave of Scottish pop. But it was Orange Juice that came to embody the "Sound of Young Scotland", with Collins' on-stage behaviour, charity-shop chic and occasional self-parody combining camp aesthetics with a subversive rejection of macho rock and roll cliché. Live, performances could be shambolic, with guitars often out of tune, and songs often aborted as drums, bass and guitar raced away from each other. Occasionally, crowds were hostile towards the band, seeing them as effeminate and anti-rock. Nonetheless, gigs in Glasgow and then Edinburgh began to attract a sizable fan-base: gigs with Josef K and The Go Betweens were sold as 'Postcard' nights, including the 'Funky Glasgow Now' show at Glasgow Technical College in April 1980.

The band's debut single was followed by a series of well-received Postcard 7" releases: "Blue Boy", "Simply Thrilled Honey" and "Poor Old Soul" in 1980–81. Selling sufficiently to appear prominently in the independent charts, these garnered considerable interest from the London-based music press, much of which appeared charmed by the band's on-stage antics, particularly the self-depreciating humour of Collins and the oddball-antics of occasional vocalist James Kirk. However, Radio One DJ's John Peel was initially unimpressed, describing their music as 'curious'. Peel's introduction to the band came when he was accosted outside the BBC by Alan Horne and Edwyn Collins, brandishing a copy of the debut 45, 'Falling and Laughing'. Horne criticized Peels's focus on Manchester and Liverpool bands and stated that Orange Juice represented the future.

Peel confirmed the story a few days later, on 21 February 1980, when he gave airtime to the record for the first time on his BFBS show. Later, the show's producer John Walters nonetheless picked up on the band's popularity and invited them to record two Radio One sessions for Peel and, in the autumn of 1980, the band was invited on a national tour by Peel-favourites The Undertones, gaining further exposure south of the border. One of these gigs was at a new venue, Rock City in Nottingham: coming on as support band, Orange Juice became the first band to play this venue (on 11 Dec 1980). Collins recalls that during the tour with The Undertones, skinheads shout homophobic slurs at the band, and the band intentionally exaggerated that flamboyant, "effeminate" image.

Demos for an album on Postcard were completed in a single day at Hellfire Studios in Glasgow in 1981, with the working title Ostrich Churchyard. Seeking better distribution to get the debut album to a larger audience, Postcard approached Rough Trade Records with these demos, with Rough Trade agreeing to fund recording sessions in London in the summer of 1981, promising to distribute the debut album whilst allowing Postcard to retain artistic freedom. The album was recorded in Regent's Park Studios in London in August 1981, under the auspices of Scritti Politti producer Adam Kidron, who sought to augment the band's guitar-based sound with backing singers, horns and keyboards, emulating the sound that had made Scritti Politti's "The "Sweetest Girl"" a modest crossover hit. Kidron believed the album could reach a wider pop audience and said his production added horns, strings and other elements without obsucring the band's existing sound.

Afterwards, Orange Juice took the tapes from the sessions with Kidron and signed to Polydor, hastening the demise of Postcard. A scheduled final Orange Juice single on Postcard, "Wan Light", failed to ever see the light of day. Collins later described the move to Polydor as a mistake and said the band had been naive about leaving the independent sector.

The Postcard Records-era history of Orange Juice is featured in the 2015 documentary film Big Gold Dream and the 2014 book by Simon Reynolds 'Simply Thrilled Honey: the preposterous tale of Postcard Records'.

=== Debut album and the search for a hit ===
Debut album You Can't Hide Your Love Forever was not released by Polydor until February 1982, and received mixed reviews, with the use of backing singers and synthesizers anathema to some of the band's long-term fans. Retrospectively, however, the album is often cited as a classic of the era and a key influence on the C86 generation and beyond. By the stage the album was released, the band in any case had a new line-up: in August 1981, Josef K split up, with Collins asking guitarist Malcolm Ross to join the band, making it a five-piece. This caused some ructions, with Daly and Kirk reportedly feeling the band was losing its original sound (Daly in particularly having publicly objected to the first Polydor single "L.O.V.E... Love", a cover of the Al Green classic, released in October 1981). Collins was reported in the press as siding with Kirk and Daly before deciding to leave with Malcolm Ross and bass player David McClymont who wanted to pursue the more commercial sound Kidron and others had promoted.

Collins, Ross and McClymont performed as a three-piece, with stand-in drummers, on a couple of shambolic Autumn 1981 gigs, and also auditioned drummers including Ian Stoddart, later of Win, before Zimbabwean political refugee Zeke Manyika made his live debut in January 1982 at The Venue (Victoria Street, London). As such, the line-up that promoted You Can't Hide Your Love Forever on tour in early 1982 was not the line-up that recorded it: ignoring older material penned by James Kirk (e.g. "Felicity", "Wan Light", "You Old Eccentric", "Three Cheers for Our Side") the band often used dates to debut new songs overtly more pop in style, including a cover of The Staple Singers' "I'll Take You There", future single "I Can't Help Myself" (with its telling reference to The Four Tops), and "In Spite of It All", the later also recorded for a David Jensen radio session before being renamed as "Two Hearts Together" in the summer of 1982. This single was released in 1982 as a double A-side with "Hokoyo", a song co-written by Zeke Manyika featuring lyrics in Shona, showing the band moving away from its original guitar-based sound and towards a more varied and eclectic musical palette in keeping with the wider shifts in the independent music scene away from angular post-punk to sophisti-pop and New Pop. Yet despite straining for a hit single, 'Two Hearts Together'/'Hokoyo' stalled at number 60. Collins later described the release as a mistake, stating that the band had tried too consciously to follow New Pop trends and that 'I Can't Help Myself' felt contrived.

By late 1982 it appeared Orange Juice's moment had passed, with one journalist noting the band appeared to be stalking the 'barren and friendless terrain between a cold critical shoulder and yet-to-come mass public admiration'.

=== Rip It Up and chart success ===
The second OJ album Rip It Up, issued in November 1982, was preceded by another overtly poppy single 'I Cant Help Myself', which nearly made the Top 40 peaking at 42. As well as this single, the album including songs that had been part of the Orange Juice live set since 1980 ('Louise Louise') alongside the energetic Afro-pop of 'Million Pleading Faces' and Malcolm Ross' reworking of an earlier Josef K song 'Heaven Sent' as 'Turn Away'. This eclectic but well produced album received some poor reviews from those who had previously championed the band, with the NME suggesting their "Postcard singles served them better than any fetchingly polished album ever will", describing the album as "faceless pop music". Nonetheless, by this stage the band was regularly feted in the more mainstream music press, including Smash Hits, whose editor Ian Cranna became the band's manager.

Despite mixed reviews, the album Rip It Up was to spawn the single of the same name, which ultimately reached number 8 on the UK Singles Chart in February 1983. Referencing both Chic and the Buzzcocks, the single propelled Orange Juice to the higher echelons of the 'new pop' scene. The single was promoted through two memorable Top of the Pops performances, including one where bass player David McClymont appeared to fall into the crowd, apparently inebriated, gaining them a ban from the programme. DJ Janice Long championed the band, commissioning two further Radio One Sessions in March 1983 (neither commercially released, and assumed missing from the BBC archive). However, the follow-up single to "Rip It Up", "Flesh of My Flesh", failed to build on its success, peaking at number 41 in the spring of 1983 despite being issued in multiple formats including a 7-inch picture disc and a 12-inch with a Dennis Bovell dub remix.

=== Later years ===
New single "Place in my Heart" was scheduled for October 1983 as a teaser for an album to follow the following month. In interviews Collins said the new material would have more tension and excitement and would be recorded more directly in studio.

However, both the single and album were pulled following Ross and McClymont's decision to leave the group, citing 'musical differences'. Collins recalled MyClymont returned from recording in Barbados with greater confidence in the studio, which led to clashes in their approaches and contributed to the group's dissolution.

The last appearance of the four-piece Orange Juice was their open-air festival appearance at Victoria Park, Hackney, on 6 August 1983, as part of the GLC Hiroshima Peace Festival - their first outdoor gig.

Salvaged from the album sessions, the six-track EP Texas Fever, appeared belatedly in March 1984, containing one Ross-penned tune ('Punch Drunk') and five Collins originals, many seemingly inspired by the iconography of Americana. Less chart-friendly than the previous album, the collection seemed to signal Collins' desire to cement the band's cult status by positioning it as a political art-pop outfit. Collins explained Texas Fever as a metaphor for the decline of the West and capitalism and presented Orange Juice as a "morally sound" group despite its reputation for frivolity.

The album was critically feted for its playful pastiche of classic rock and roll, soul, and punk, with plentiful nods towards The Velvet Underground, Stax Records and US country, but failed to spawn a hit with its only single, "Bridge", which peaked at number 67 in the UK chart.

From this point Orange Juice had a core line-up of Collins and Manyika, the former becoming more outspoken about political issues such as UK miners' strike, Scottish nationalism and Thatcherism, as well as those bands who were inspired by the Postcard Records sound but were beginning to eclipse Orange Juice in the charts - the Smiths and also Polydor labelmates Lloyd Cole and the Commotions and Newcastle-based Kitchenware Records. Collins claimed Kitchenware Records as derivative of Postcard's image and said he disliked the music of bands associated with it.

The duo of Collins and Manyika proceeded to record Orange Juice's final album, The Orange Juice, with Clare Kenny on bass. Produced by Dennis Bovell, the album was named with reference to the third album by The Velvet Underground. Again critically acclaimed, the album's blue-eyed soul influences presaged other 1980s Scottish acts taking inspiration from this genre, including Wet Wet Wet and Hue and Cry. The album's lead single "What Presence?!" had a video by Derek Jarman but also failed to break into the top 40, peaking at 47, while single "Lean Period" just crept into the top 75 in October 1984. Johnny Britten on guitar and Paul Herd on bass played with the group live. The album was promoted via an appearance on The Old Grey Whistle Test as well as 'The Artisans' tour in late 1984, with Steve Skinner replacing Britten on guitar, but by this stage venues and crowds were becoming smaller (and a final London Lyceum date in December 1984 was cancelled because of poor sales). Relations with Polydor became strained by the fact Orange Juice could not tour internationally because of Zeke Manyika's immigration status, and the release of a third single from the album was vetoed as the record label focused on other acts, such as Lloyd Cole and the Commotions to Collins' vocal disapproval. At the same time, Collins' decision to release material with former schoolfriend Paul Quinn on Alan Horne's new Swampland Records label further soured the relationship with Polydor.

The band's final show was in January 1985 at a gig for the UK miners' strike, where they came on as the first act (before Aztec Camera and Everything but the Girl), announcing it was their last gig to a half-empty venue. Their final song was "Rock and Roll (I Gave You the Best Years of My Life)", a cover of a Kevin Johnson song. Collins later recall the band had reached a natural end because Polydor was dropping him and Manyika was occupied with his solo career; he also recalled audience members crying at the final show.

Following the split, Manyika recorded a solo album for Polydor, who also released an Orange Juice 'greatest hits' album In a Nutshell in 1985. Collins, managed by Grace Maxwell, who was later to become his wife, signed for Creation Records the same year, with his solo debut single "Don't Shilly Shally" released on the Creation-offshoot Elevation Records in 1986. In 1994, his track "A Girl Like You" became a global hit, spending seven weeks inside the UK Top 10.

=== Legacy ===
Media interest in Orange Juice, alongside The Associates and Simple Minds, arguably fuelled an interest in Scottish pop that paved the way for the chart success of contemporaries including Altered Images, The Bluebells, and fellow Postcard Records artists Aztec Camera. Another band, Strawberry Switchblade, accompanied Orange Juice on tour in 1982 before their major commercial success, emerging alongside The Pastels from the coterie found at 185 West Princes Gardens during the Postcard years.

It is reputed that the band James were encouraged to change their name after supporting Orange Juice in Sheffield in 1982, with James Kirk suggesting their previous name Model Team International was poorly chosen and they should name their band after him. Details of this particular gig are not clear although Paul Gilbertson, the co-founder of James is on record as a major Orange Juice fan. Haircut 100 were also professed Orange Juice fans, and displayed the clear influence of Postcard Records. China Crisis, Marine Girls, The Farmer's Boys and The Pale Fountains also supported Orange Juice on tour, as did Australian band The Go Betweens, the latter having signed to Postcard for a one-off single in 1980.

While never enjoying prolonged commercial success, Orange Juice were to exercise considerable influence over the indie pop and indie rock scenes in the mid and late 1980s in the UK. Commentators often noted the debt that The Smiths owed to Collins' lyrics, while a number of other later 1980s bands were to cite Orange Juice and other Postcard Records acts as an influence, with the C86 scene featuring numerous acts who either covered Orange Juice songs (such as The Wedding Present) or who borrowed elements of their early sound (such as Mighty Mighty, The Chesterf!elds, The June Brides, The Bodines). Aesthetically, Orange Juice's early look - floppy fringes and checked shirts - became the de facto uniform of the late 1980s indie scene, to the indifference of Collins who sometimes mocked these acts in his live shows.

Internationally, Orange Juice also inspired the neo-acoustic movement in Japan, with the band Flipper's Guitar naming their 1989 debut album after one of James Kirk's compositions, "Three Cheers for Our Side".

In the 1990s, the rejuvenated Postcard Records issued a collection of the band's early singles ('The Heather's on Fire') on cassette, CD and vinyl, and in 1993 finally released the demos for the first album Ostrich Churchyard alongside a reissue of "Blue Boy" on 7-inch and CD single. Around the same time, Polydor collected the best of their major releases on a new 'best of' compilation, The Esteemed – The Very Best of Orange Juice.

In the 2000s, a new wave of indie bands including Franz Ferdinand, Belle and Sebastian, Hatcham Social, The Drums, and The Cribs proclaimed Orange Juice as an influence, triggering renewed interest in the band. Franz Ferdinand's label, the Domino Recording Company, responded by issuing a collection of the Postcard singles in 2005, entitled 'The Glasgow School', given a 5* review in The Guardian. Alexis Petridis praised the recordings' musical distinctiveness and their subversion of macho rock conventions.

Domino also re-released of all Orange Juice's Polydor albums on vinyl and CD, with a major 6 CD/DVD collection Coals to Newcastle released in 2010 (many copies were destroyed in a warehouse fire]. Later, Collins' own AED records reissued the Polydor albums on vinyl, as well as the Coals to Newcastle box set.

Edwyn Collins continued to perform Orange Juice songs at his solo live shows when he began touring again in 1986, often including later Orange Juice material "Bridge", "What Presence!?" and "Place in my Heart" in his set. Though Malcolm Ross was initially part of Collins's live band in the 1980s, alongside sometime Orange Juice producer Dennis Bovell, and Kirk, Manyika, and McClymont continue to record and perform intermittently, the band has never reformed. To date, the original line-up of the band has reunited publicly just once, in 2008, when they were honoured for their influence on Scottish music by the Nordoff Robbins musical trust. Two of the band's original line-up, Daly and Kirk, joined Collins on stage during the encore of his performance at the Theatre Royal, Glasgow on 27 September and at The Royal Festival Hall in London on 4 October 2025, both part of Collins' "testimonial" tour.

UK Prime Minister Keir Starmer chose "Falling and Laughing" as one of his Desert Island Discs in 2020.

== Discography ==
=== Albums ===
- You Can't Hide Your Love Forever (1982)
- Rip It Up (1982)
- The Orange Juice (1984)

=== Mini-album/EP ===
- Texas Fever (1984)

=== Compilation albums ===
- In a Nutshell (1985)
- Ostrich Churchyard (1992)
- The Heather's on Fire (1993)
- The Glasgow School (2005)
- Coals to Newcastle (2010)

=== Video ===
- dAda with Juice (1985) (recorded live at Hammersmith Palais, July 1984)
