= The Nectarine No. 9 =

- Origin: Edinburgh, Scotland
- Genres: Indie
- Years active: 1991–2004
- Labels: Postcard Records; Creeping Bent; Beggars Banquet
- Past members: Davy Henderson; Simon Smeeton; Iain Holford; John Thompson

The Nectarine No. 9 were an indie band from Edinburgh, Scotland. Formed by former Fire Engines frontman Davy Henderson in 1991, the band's music has been described as "dark, moody and brilliant" "noisy guitar rock" with "quirky rhythms". The Nectarine No. 9 released several albums throughout the 1990s and 2000s, and recorded seven John Peel sessions.

== Discography ==
=== Albums ===
- A Sea with Three Stars (Postcard, 1992)
- Niagara Falls (Shake, 1994)
- Guitar Thieves (Nighttracks/Postcard, 1995)
- Saint Jack (Postcard, 1995)
- Fried for Blue Material (Creeping Bent, 1998)
- Its Just the Way Things Are Joe, Its Just the Way Things Are (Creeping Bent, 1999)
- Received, Transgressed and Transmitted (Beggars Banquet, 2001)
- Society Is a Carnivorous Flower (Beggars Banquet, 2003)
- I Love Total Destruction (Beggars Banquet, 2004)
