= Postcard Records =

British independent record label

Postcard Records is a Scottish, Glasgow-based independent record label founded by Alan Horne in 1979, as a vehicle for releases by Orange Juice and Josef K. The label's motto was "The Sound of Young Scotland", a parody/tribute to the Motown motto; its logo featured a cartoon cat beating a drum. Although short-lived, Postcard was a key influence on the C81 and the later C86 indie-pop movements.

The label's first release, in spring 1980, was Orange Juice's, "Falling and Laughing", which was jointly financed by Horne and band members Edwyn Collins and bass guitarist David McClymont. The label went on to sign such bands as Aztec Camera and The Go-Betweens, before winding down in 1981 shortly after Orange Juice left to sign a major deal with Polydor. In 1984 Horne then started a new label as part of a deal with London Records, called Swamplands, releasing a handful of singles before folding. He then resuscitated Postcard in 1992, releasing various new albums and retrospectives until 1997.

The label was profiled in depth in 2015 documentary film, Big Gold Dream, and the 2014 book by Simon Goddard, Simply Thrilled: The Preposterous Story of Postcard Records, although both concentrate largely on the original 1980-81 era of the label, and Alan Horne declined to be involved in either endeavour.

In March 2020, Postcard Records appeared to be showing signs of activity again, via a Twitter account @Dubh18.5. Tweets referencing "some kind of reboot", and various archival footage in a series of GIFs hinting at further releases.

In December 2020, it was announced that the label was being reactivated as "Postcard Recordings Of Scotland Extra Terrestrial" to release a deluxe anthology vinyl boxset of recordings by Paul Quinn & The Independent Group, including a 144 page hard backed book.

== Postcard Records discography (1980–1981) ==
Date	Artist	Title	Type	UK Indie Chart position	Catalogue ref
February 1980	Orange Juice	"Falling and Laughing"	Single	No. 48	80 1
August 1980	Orange Juice	"Blue Boy"	Single	No. 15	80 2
August 1980	Josef K	"Radio Drill Time"	Single	No. 15	80 3
November 1980	The Go-Betweens	"I Need Two Heads"	Single	No. 6	80 4
December 1980	Josef K	"It's Kinda Funny"	Single	No. 12	80 5
December 1980	Orange Juice	"Simply Thrilled Honey"	Single	No. 5	80 6
March 1981	Orange Juice	"Poor Old Soul"	Single	No. 5	81 2
March 1981	Aztec Camera	"Just Like Gold"	Single	No. 10	81 3
March 1981	Josef K	"Sorry For Laughing"	Single	–	81 4
May 1981	Josef K	"Chance Meeting"	Single	No. 5	81 5
1981	Orange Juice	"Wan Light" (assigned serial number but never issued)	Single	–	81 6
July 1981	Josef K	"The Only Fun in Town"	Album	No. 3	81 7
August 1981	Aztec Camera	"Mattress Of Wire"	Single	No. 8	81 8

== Swamplands discography (1984–1985) ==
- SWP 1 Paul Quinn and Edwyn Collins – "Pale Blue Eyes" 7" (1984)
- SWP 2 Patti Palladin and Johnny Thunders – "Crawfish" 7" (1984) (unreleased)
- SWP 3 James King and The Lonewolves - "The Angels Know" 7" (1985)
- SWP 4 Memphis – "You Supply The Roses" 7" (1985)
- SWP 5 Win – "Unamerican Broadcasting" 7" (1985)
- SWP 6 Paul Quinn – "Ain't That Always The Way" 7" (1985)
- SWP 7 James King and The Lonewolves – "Flyaway" 7" (1985) (unreleased)
- SWP 8 Win – "You've Got The Power" 7" (1985)

== Postcard Records discography (1992–1997) ==
- DUBH 921 Paul Quinn And The Independent Group – "The Phantoms & the Archetypes" LP (1992)
- DUBH 922 Orange Juice – "Ostrich Churchyard" LP (1992)
- DUBH 931 The Nectarine No. 9 – "A Sea With Three Stars" LP (1993)
- DUBH 932 Orange Juice – "The Heather's on Fire" LP (1993)
- DUBH 933 Paul Quinn And The Independent Group – "Stupid Thing" EP (1993)
- DUBH 934 Orange Juice – "Blue Boy" EP (1993)
- DUBH 935 Paul Quinn And The Independent Group – "Road Song, Road Movie, Road Song" EP (1993) (Unreleased)
- DUBH 936 Vic Godard – "End Of The Surrey People" LP (1993)
- DUBH 937 Vic Godard – "Won't Turn Back" EP (1993)
- DUBH 939 The Nectarine No. 9 – "Un-Loaded For You" EP (1993)
- DUBH 9315 Various – "D'Un Échantillon De Marchandises" EP (1993)
- DUBH 941 The Nectarine No. 9 – "Guitar Thieves" LP (1994)
- DUBH 942 The Nectarine No. 9 – "This Arsehole's Been Burned Too Many Times Before" 7" (1994)
- DUBH 945 Paul Quinn And The Independent Group – "Will I Ever Be Inside of You" LP (1994)
- DUBH 951 The Nectarine No. 9 – "Saint Jack" LP (1995)
- DUBH 952 Paul Quinn, The Nectarine No 9, Jock Scot – "Pregnant With Possibilities (Volume One)" EP (1995)
- DUBH 972 Jock Scot – "My Personal Culloden" LP (1997)

== Postcard Records discography (2021) ==
- DUBH 18.5 Paul Quinn And The Independent Group – "Unadulterated/Unincorporated" Vinyl Boxset (2021)

== Postcard Records miscellaneous ==
- POSP 357 Orange Juice – "L.O.V.E. Love" 7" (1981)
- POLS 1057 Orange Juice – "You Can't Hide Your Love Forever" LP (1982)
- POSP 386 Orange Juice – "Felicity" 7" (1982)

The above releases all had the Postcard drumming kitten logo on sleeve and label. The 7" catalogue numbers were prefixed POS(tcard)P(olydor)

== See also ==
- List of record labels
- List of independent UK record labels
