= List of UK top-ten singles in 1983 =

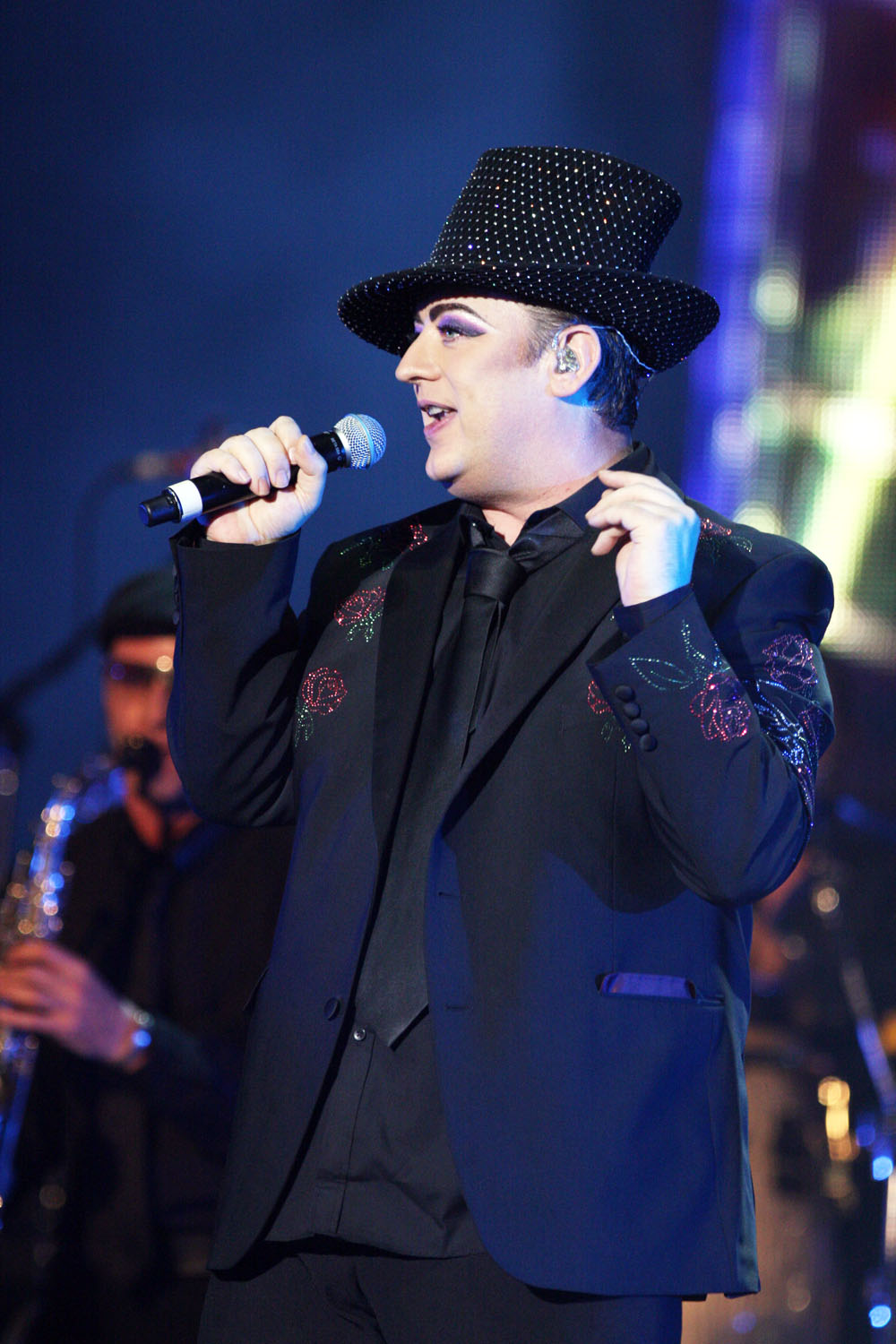
Boy George (pictured in 2011) and his band Culture Club had the best-selling single of 1983 with "Karma Chameleon", which topped the chart for six weeks. The group had a total of four top 10 singles this year, all peaking in the top three.

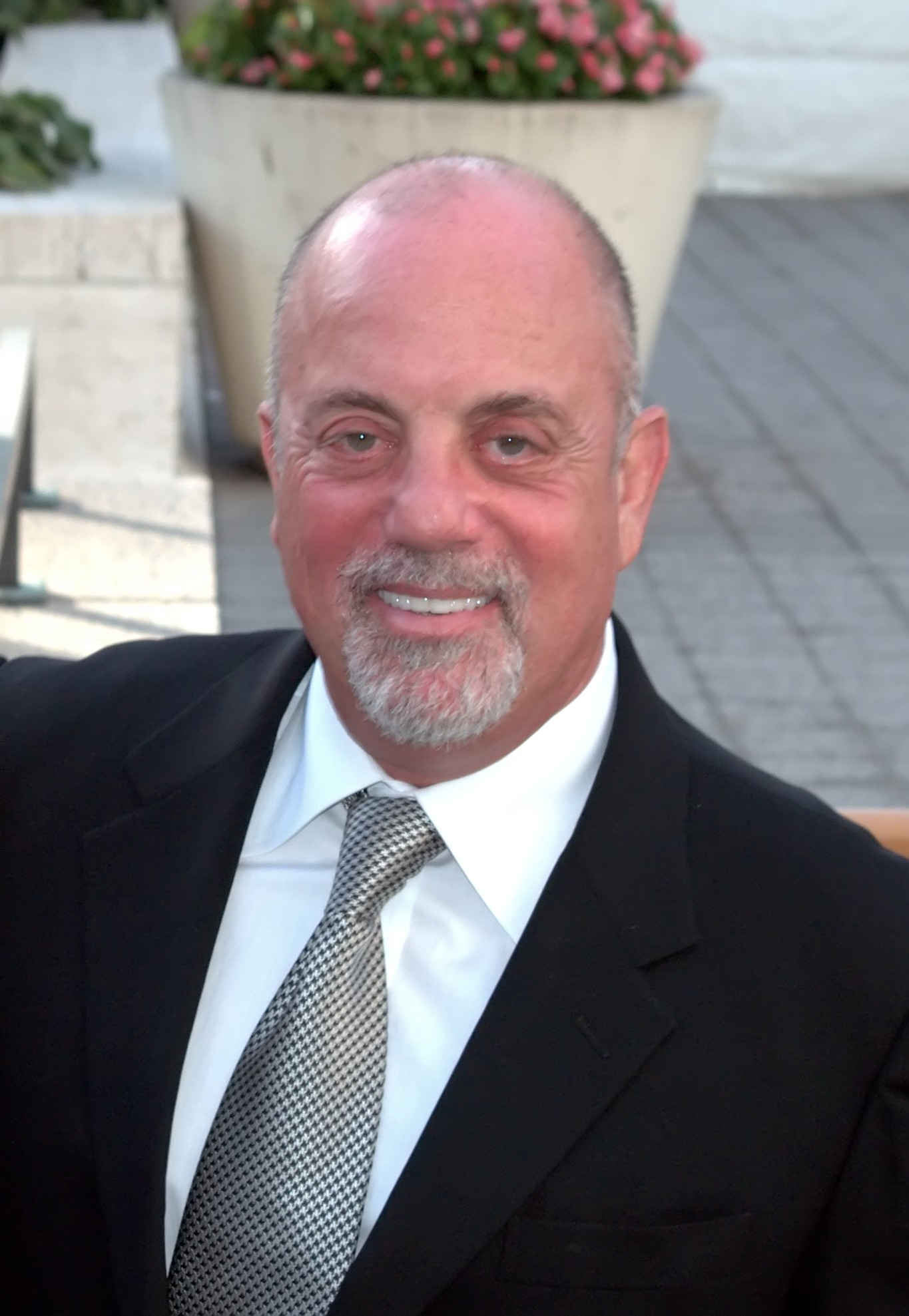
Billy Joel (pictured in 2009) scored two top 10 singles this year, including his only UK number-one hit, "Uptown Girl", which became the year's second best selling single.

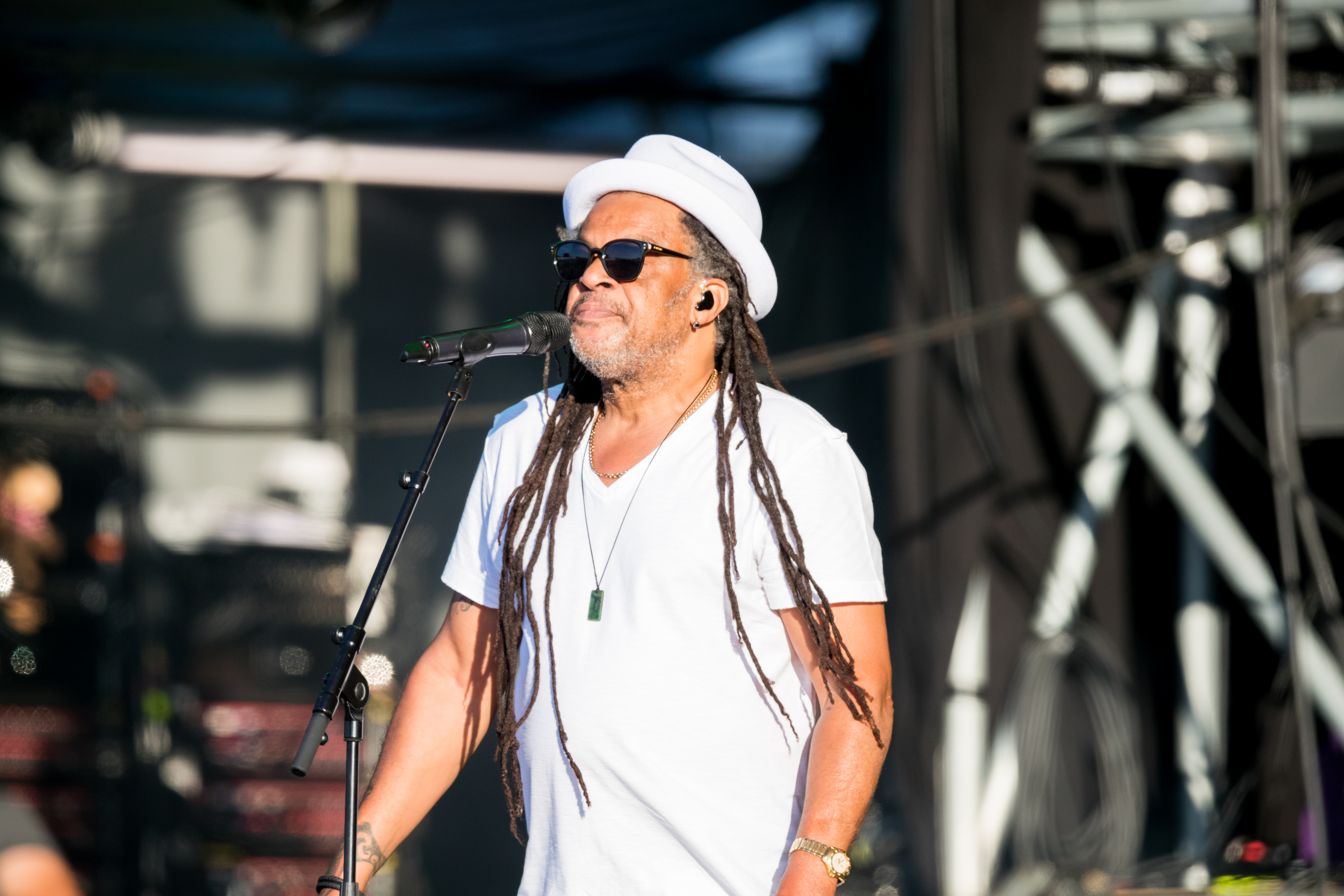
UB40 (band member Astro pictured in 2018) had two top 10 hits in 1983, including "Red Red Wine", which topped the chart for three weeks and went on to become the third best selling single of the year.

The UK Singles Chart is one of many music charts compiled by the Official Charts Company that calculates the best-selling singles of the week in the United Kingdom. Before 2004, the chart was only based on the sales of physical singles. This list shows singles that peaked in the Top 10 of the UK Singles Chart during 1983, as well as singles which peaked in 1982 and 1984 but were in the top 10 in 1983. The entry date is when the single appeared in the top 10 for the first time (week ending, as published by the Official Charts Company, which is six days after the chart is announced).

One-hundred and forty-nine singles were in the top ten in 1983. Ten singles from 1982 remained in the top 10 for several weeks at the beginning of the year, while "Islands in the Stream" by Kenny Rogers & Dolly Parton, "Marguerita Time" by Status Quo and "Tell Her About It" by Billy Joel were all released in 1983 but did not reach their peak until 1984. "A Winter's Tale" by David Essex, "Best Years of Our Lives" by Modern Romance and "You Can't Hurry Love" by Phil Collins were the singles from 1982 to reach their peak in 1983. Thirty-three artists scored multiple entries in the top 10 in 1983. Billy Joel, The Cure, Eurythmics, Paul Young and U2 were among the many artists who achieved their first UK charting top 10 single in 1983.

The 1982 Christmas number-one, "Save Your Love" by Renée and Renato, remained at number-one for the first two weeks of 1983. The first new number-one single of the year was "You Can't Hurry Love" by Phil Collins of Genesis. Overall, eighteen different singles peaked at number-one in 1983, with eighteen unique artists having singles hitting that position.

== Background ==
=== Multiple entries ===
One-hundred and forty-nine singles charted in the top 10 in 1983, with one-hundred and thirty-nine singles reaching their peak this year.

Thirty-three artists scored multiple entries in the top 10 in 1983. Michael Jackson secured the record for most top 10 hits in 1983 with five hit singles.

Billy Joel was one of a number of artists with two top-ten entries, including the number-one single "Uptown Girl". Bananarama, David Essex, Heaven 17, Lionel Richie and The Police were among the other artists who had multiple top 10 entries in 1983.

=== Chart debuts ===
Forty-nine artists achieved their first top 10 single in 1983, either as a lead or featured artist. Of these, seven went on to record another hit single that year: Big Country, Billy Joel, Heaven 17, JoBoxers, Malcolm McLaren, The Style Council and Thompson Twins. Three artists achieved two more chart hits in 1983: Kajagoogoo, Paul Young and Tracey Ullman. Eurythmics had three other entries in their breakthrough year.

The following table (collapsed on desktop site) does not include acts who had previously charted as part of a group and secured their first top 10 solo single.

Artist	Number of top 10s	First entry	Chart position	Other entries
Keith Harris and Orville	1	"Orville's Song"	4	—
Men at Work	1	"Down Under"	1	—
Wah!	1	"The Story of the Blues"	3	—
Malcolm McLaren	2	"Buffalo Gals"	9	"Double Dutch" (3)
The World's Famous Supreme Team	1	"Buffalo Gals"	9	—
The Maisonettes	1	"Heartache Avenue"	7	—
Kajagoogoo	3	"Too Shy"	1	"Ooh to Be Ah" (7), "Big Apple" (8)
The Belle Stars	1	"Sing of the Times"	3	—
Laura Branigan	1	"Gloria"	6	—
Echo & the Bunnymen	1	"The Cutter"	8	—
U2	1	"New Year's Day"	10	—
Jennifer Warnes	1	"Up Where We Belong"	7	—
Toto	1	"Africa"	3	—
Eurythmics	4	"Sweet Dreams (Are Made of This)"	2	"Love Is a Stranger" (6), "Who's That Girl?" (3), "Right by Your Side" (10)
Thompson Twins	2	"Love On Your Side"	9	"We Are Detective" (7)
Forrest	1	"Rock the Boat"	4	—
The Style Council	2	"Speak Like a Child"	4	"Long Hot Summer"/"The Paris Match" (3)
Orange Juice	1	"Rip It Up"	8	—
JoBoxers	2	"Boxerbeat"	3	"Just Got Lucky" (7)
Tracey Ullman	3	"Breakaway"	4	"They Don't Know" (2), "Move Over Darling" (8)
Kenny Everett	1	"Snot Rap"	9	—
F.R. David	1	"Words"	2	—
Big Country	2	"Fields of Fire"	10	"Chance" (9)
Tracie	1	"The House That Jack Built"	9	—
London Philharmonic Orchestra	1	"True Love Ways"	8	—
Heaven 17	2	"Temptation"	2	"Come Live with Me" (5)
Galaxy	1	"Dancing Tight"	4	—
Phil Fearon	1	"Dancing Tight"	4	—
New Edition	1	"Candy Girl"	1	—
Booker Newberry III	1	"Love Town"	6	—
Flash and the Pan	1	"Waiting for a Train"	7	—
Paul Young	3	"Wherever I Lay My Hat (That's My Home)"	1	"Come Back and Stay" (4), "Love of the Common People" (2)
Funk Masters	1	"It's Over"	8	—
Gary Byrd and the GB Experience	1	"The Crown"	6	—
Herbie Hancock	1	"Rockit"	8	—
David Grant	1	"Watching You, Watching Me"	10	—
Peabo Bryson	1	"Tonight, I Celebrate My Love"	2	—
Level 42	1	"The Sun Goes Down (Living It Up)"	10	—
Ryan Paris	1	"Dolce Vita"	5	—
New Order	1	"Blue Monday"	9	—
Howard Jones	1	"New Song"	3	—
Rock Steady Crew	1	"(Hey You) The Rock Steady Crew"	6	—
Black Lace	1	"Superman"	9	—
Billy Joel	2	"Uptown Girl"	1	"Tell Her About It" (4) ^{[A]}
Men Without Hats	1	"The Safety Dance"	6	—
The Cure	1	"The Love Cats"	7	—
The Assembly	1	"Never Never"	4	—
Marilyn	1	"Calling Your Name"	4	—
The Flying Pickets	1	"Only You"	1	—

Notes

Phil Everly achieved his first solo top ten single in 1983, his collaboration with Cliff Richard, "She Means Nothing to Me", landing at number nine. With his brother Don, the Everly Brothers had 13 top ten hits between 1957 and 1965. Tom Robinson fronted the Tom Robinson Band from 1976 to 1979, with their biggest hit "2-4-6-8 Motorway" reaching number 5. "War Baby" became his first and only solo top 10 single. Tina Turner's previous recordings were all with her husband Ike under the name Ike & Tina Turner, debuting with the number 3 hit "River Deep Mountain High" in 1966. "Let's Stay Together" marked her first time in the top ten by herself.

=== Songs from films ===
Original songs from various films entered the top 10 throughout the year. These included "Up Where We Belong" (An Officer and a Gentleman) and "Flashdance... What a Feeling" (Flashdance).

=== Best-selling singles ===
Culture Club had the best-selling single of the year with "Karma Chameleon". The single spent ten weeks in the top 10 (including six weeks at number one) and sold over 1.39 million copies and was certified platinum by the BPI. "Uptown Girl" by Billy Joel came in second place, selling more than 949,000 copies and losing out by around 390,000 sales. UB40's "Red Red Wine", "Let's Dance" from David Bowie and "Total Eclipse of the Heart" by Bonnie Tyler made up the top five. Singles by Spandau Ballet, Men at Work, Michael Jackson, The Flying Pickets and Lionel Richie were also in the top ten best-selling singles of the year.

== Top-ten singles ==
Symbol	Meaning
‡	Single peaked in 1982 but still in chart in 1983.
♦	Single released in 1983 but peaked in 1984.
(#)	Year-end top-ten single position and rank
Entered	The date that the single first appeared in the chart.
Peak	Highest position that the single reached in the UK Singles Chart.

Entered (week ending)	Weeks in top 10	Single	Artist	Peak	Peak reached (week ending)	Weeks at peak
Singles in 1982
27 November 1982	8	"Save Your Love" ‡	Renée and Renato	1	18 December 1982	4
4 December 1982	5	"Beat Surrender" ‡	The Jam	1	4 December 1982	2
4 December 1982	5	"Truly" ‡	Lionel Richie	6	4 December 1982	3
4 December 1982	7	"Time (Clock of the Heart)" ‡	Culture Club	3	18 December 1982	1
18 December 1982	4	"The Shakin' Stevens EP" ‡	Shakin' Stevens	2	25 December 1982	2
18 December 1982	5	"Our House" ‡	Madness	5	18 December 1982	4
18 December 1982	5	"Best Years of Our Lives"	Modern Romance	4	8 January 1983	1
18 December 1982	4	"Peace on Earth"/"Little Drummer Boy" ‡	David Bowie & Bing Crosby	3	25 December 1982	2
25 December 1982	8	"You Can't Hurry Love"	Phil Collins	1	15 January 1983	2
25 December 1982	5	"A Winter's Tale"	David Essex	2	15 January 1983	1
Singles in 1983
8 January 1983	4	"Orville's Song"	Keith Harris & Orville	4	15 January 1983	1
8 January 1983	1	"All the Love in the World"	Dionne Warwick	10	8 January 1983	1
15 January 1983	4	"The Story of the Blues"	Wah!	3	22 January 1983	1
15 January 1983	7	"Down Under" (#7)	Men at Work	1	29 January 1983	3
15 January 1983	1	"Buffalo Gals"	Malcolm McLaren & The World's Famous Supreme Team	9	15 January 1983	1
15 January 1983	1	"If You Can't Stand the Heat"	Bucks Fizz	10	15 January 1983	1
22 January 1983	5	"Electric Avenue"	Eddy Grant	2	5 February 1983	1
22 January 1983	2	"Heartache Avenue"	The Maisonettes	7	22 January 1983	2
22 January 1983	3	"Steppin' Out"	Joe Jackson	6	29 January 1983	1
22 January 1983	1	"European Female"	The Stranglers	9	22 January 1983	1
29 January 1983	5	"Sign of the Times"	The Belle Stars	3	19 February 1983	1
29 January 1983	3	"Gloria"	Laura Branigan	6	5 February 1983	2
29 January 1983	7	"Too Shy"	Kajagoogoo	1	19 February 1983	2
5 February 1983	1	"The Cutter"	Echo & the Bunnymen	8	5 February 1983	1
5 February 1983	1	"New Year's Day"	U2	10	5 February 1983	1
12 February 1983	4	"Change"	Tears for Fears	4	19 February 1983	2
12 February 1983	3	"Up Where We Belong"	Joe Cocker & Jennifer Warnes	7	12 February 1983	3
12 February 1983	3	"Wham Rap! (Enjoy What You Do)"	Wham!	8	19 February 1983	1
12 February 1983	2	"Oh Diane"	Fleetwood Mac	9	19 February 1983	1
19 February 1983	6	"Billie Jean" (#8)	Michael Jackson	1	5 March 1983	1
19 February 1983	5	"Africa"	Toto	3	26 February 1983	1
26 February 1983	3	"Never Gonna Give You Up"	Musical Youth	6	5 March 1983	1
26 February 1983	3	"Tomorrow's (Just Another Day)"/"Madness (Is All in the Mind)"	Madness	8	5 March 1983	2
5 March 1983	6	"Total Eclipse of the Heart" (#5)	Bonnie Tyler	1	12 March 1983	2
5 March 1983	6	"Sweet Dreams (Are Made of This)"	Eurythmics	2	19 March 1983	1
5 March 1983	2	"Love On Your Side"	Thompson Twins	9	5 March 1983	2
5 March 1983	1	"The Tunnel Of Love"	Fun Boy Three	10	5 March 1983	1
12 March 1983	4	"Rock the Boat"	Forrest	4	12 March 1983	2
12 March 1983	4	"Na Na Hey Hey Kiss Him Goodbye"	Bananarama	5	19 March 1983	1
19 March 1983	4	"Speak Like a Child"	The Style Council	4	26 March 1983	3
19 March 1983	2	"High Life"	Modern Romance	8	19 March 1983	1
19 March 1983	1	"She Means Nothing to Me"	Phil Everly & Cliff Richard	9	19 March 1983	1
19 March 1983	3	"Rip It Up"	Orange Juice	8	2 April 1983	1
26 March 1983	4	"Is There Something I Should Know?"	Duran Duran	1	26 March 1983	2
26 March 1983	7	"Let's Dance" (#4)	David Bowie	1	9 April 1983	3
2 April 1983	4	"Boxerbeat"	JoBoxers	3	9 April 1983	1
2 April 1983	1	"Don't Talk to Me About Love"	Altered Images	7	2 April 1983	1
9 April 1983	4	"Breakaway"	Tracey Ullman	4	16 April 1983	1
9 April 1983	3	"Ooh to Be Ah"	Kajagoogoo	7	9 April 1983	2
9 April 1983	5	"Church of the Poison Mind"	Culture Club	2	16 April 1983	2
9 April 1983	2	"Snot Rap"	Kenny Everett	9	16 April 1983	1
16 April 1983	4	"Beat It"	Michael Jackson	3	23 April 1983	2
16 April 1983	6	"Words"	F. R. David	2	30 April 1983	2
16 April 1983	1	"Fields of Fire"	Big Country	10	16 April 1983	1
23 April 1983	2	"Love Is a Stranger"	Eurythmics	6	23 April 1983	1
23 April 1983	1	"The House That Jack Built"	Tracie	9	23 April 1983	1
23 April 1983	7	"True" (#6)	Spandau Ballet	1	30 April 1983	4
30 April 1983	4	"(Keep Feeling) Fascination"	The Human League	2	14 May 1983	1
30 April 1983	1	"True Love Ways"	Cliff Richard with the London Philharmonic Orchestra	8	30 April 1983	1
30 April 1983	3	"We Are Detective"	Thompson Twins	7	7 May 1983	1
7 May 1983	3	"Pale Shelter"	Tears for Fears	5	7 May 1983	1
7 May 1983	4	"Dancing Tight"	Galaxy featuring Phil Fearon	4	21 May 1983	1
7 May 1983	5	"Temptation"	Heaven 17	2	21 May 1983	1
14 May 1983	5	"Candy Girl"	New Edition	1	28 May 1983	1
14 May 1983	3	"Our Lips Are Sealed"	Fun Boy Three	7	21 May 1983	1
14 May 1983	5	"Can't Get Used to Losing You"	The Beat	3	28 May 1983	1
21 May 1983	1	"Blind Vision"	Blancmange	10	21 May 1983	1
28 May 1983	7	"Every Breath You Take"	The Police	1	4 June 1983	4
28 May 1983	6	"Bad Boys"	Wham!	2	4 June 1983	2
28 May 1983	5	"Nobody's Diary"	Yazoo	3	11 June 1983	1
28 May 1983	1	"What Kinda Boy You're Looking For (Girl)"	Hot Chocolate	10	28 May 1983	1
4 June 1983	3	"Buffalo Soldier"	Bob Marley and the Wailers	4	11 June 1983	1
4 June 1983	2	"Just Got Lucky"	JoBoxers	7	4 June 1983	2
4 June 1983	3	"Love Town"	Booker Newberry III	6	11 June 1983	1
11 June 1983	4	"China Girl"	David Bowie	2	18 June 1983	1
11 June 1983	7	"Flashdance... What a Feeling"	Irene Cara	2	9 July 1983	1
18 June 1983	7	"Baby Jane"	Rod Stewart	1	2 July 1983	3
18 June 1983	4	"I Guess That's Why They Call It the Blues"	Elton John	5	2 July 1983	1
18 June 1983	2	"Waiting for a Train"	Flash and the Pan	7	25 June 1983	1
25 June 1983	1	"Wanna Be Startin' Somethin'"	Michael Jackson	8	25 June 1983	1
25 June 1983	2	"When We Were Young"	Bucks Fizz	10	25 June 1983	2
2 July 1983	5	"Moonlight Shadow"	Mike Oldfield	4	2 July 1983	3
2 July 1983	8	"I.O.U."	Freeez	2	23 July 1983	3
2 July 1983	2	"Dead Giveaway"	Shalamar	8	2 July 1983	2
9 July 1983	7	"Wherever I Lay My Hat (That's My Home)"	Paul Young	1	23 July 1983	3
9 July 1983	3	"War Baby"	Tom Robinson	6	9 July 1983	1
9 July 1983	5	"Come Live with Me"	Heaven 17	5	30 July 1983	1
16 July 1983	2	"It's Over"	Funk Masters	8	16 July 1983	1
16 July 1983	5	"Who's That Girl?"	Eurythmics	3	30 July 1983	1
16 July 1983	6	"Double Dutch"	Malcolm McLaren	3	6 August 1983	1
30 July 1983	3	"The Crown" ^{[B]}	Gary Byrd and the GB Experience	6	30 July 1983	3
30 July 1983	2	"Wrapped Around Your Finger"	The Police	7	6 August 1983	1
30 July 1983	2	"Cruel Summer"	Bananarama	8	6 August 1983	1
6 August 1983	6	"Give It Up"	KC and the Sunshine Band	1	13 August 1983	3
6 August 1983	5	"Club Tropicana"	Wham!	4	20 August 1983	1
13 August 1983	4	"Long Hot Summer"/"The Paris Match"	The Style Council	3	20 August 1983	2
13 August 1983	5	"I'm Still Standing"	Elton John	4	27 August 1983	1
13 August 1983	3	"Everything Counts"	Depeche Mode	6	20 August 1983	1
20 August 1983	4	"Gold"	Spandau Ballet	2	20 August 1983	2
20 August 1983	2	"Rockit"	Herbie Hancock	8	20 August 1983	2
27 August 1983	4	"Wings of a Dove"	Madness	2	10 September 1983	1
27 August 1983	8	"Red Red Wine" (#3)	UB40	1	3 September 1983	3
27 August 1983	2	"Watching You, Watching Me"	David Grant	10	27 August 1983	2
3 September 1983	4	"What Am I Gonna Do (I'm So in Love with You)"	Rod Stewart	3	10 September 1983	1
3 September 1983	4	"Walking in the Rain"	Modern Romance	7	24 September 1983	1
10 September 1983	4	"Mama"	Genesis	4	17 September 1983	1
10 September 1983	5	"Tonight, I Celebrate My Love"	Peabo Bryson & Roberta Flack	2	17 September 1983	1
10 September 1983	2	"The Sun Goes Down (Living It Up)"	Level 42	10	10 September 1983	2
17 September 1983	10	"Karma Chameleon" (#1)	Culture Club	1	24 September 1983	6
17 September 1983	3	"Dolce Vita"	Ryan Paris	5	17 September 1983	1
17 September 1983	4	"Come Back and Stay"	Paul Young	4	24 September 1983	1
24 September 1983	5	"Modern Love"	David Bowie	2	8 October 1983	1
24 September 1983	2	"Ol' Rag Blues"	Status Quo	9	24 September 1983	1
1 October 1983	1	"Big Apple"	Kajagoogoo	8	1 October 1983	1
1 October 1983	1	"Chance"	Big Country	9	1 October 1983	1
8 October 1983	3	"Dear Prudence"	Siouxsie and the Banshees	3	15 October 1983	1
8 October 1983	2	"This Is Not a Love Song"	Public Image Ltd	5	8 October 1983	1
8 October 1983	2	"Tahiti"	David Essex	8	8 October 1983	1
8 October 1983	5	"They Don't Know"	Tracey Ullman	2	15 October 1983	2
8 October 1983	2	"Blue Monday"	New Order	9	15 October 1983	1
15 October 1983	4	"New Song"	Howard Jones	3	22 October 1983	1
15 October 1983	3	"In Your Eyes"	George Benson	7	15 October 1983	2
22 October 1983	6	"All Night Long (All Night)" (#10)	Lionel Richie	2	29 October 1983	3
22 October 1983	3	"(Hey You) The Rock Steady Crew"	Rock Steady Crew	6	22 October 1983	2
22 October 1983	2	"Superman"	Black Lace	9	22 October 1983	1
22 October 1983	5	"Say Say Say" ^{[C]}	Paul McCartney & Michael Jackson	2	19 November 1983	2
29 October 1983	3	"Union of the Snake"	Duran Duran	3	5 November 1983	1
29 October 1983	8	"Uptown Girl" (#2)	Billy Joel	1	5 November 1983	5
29 October 1983	4	"The Safety Dance"	Men Without Hats	6	5 November 1983	1
5 November 1983	3	"Puss 'n Boots"	Adam Ant	5	12 November 1983	1
5 November 1983	1	"Please Don't Make Me Cry"	UB40	10	5 November 1983	1
12 November 1983	4	"Cry Just a Little Bit"	Shakin' Stevens	3	19 November 1983	2
12 November 1983	3	"The Sun and the Rain"	Madness	5	19 November 1983	1
12 November 1983	3	"The Love Cats"	The Cure	7	19 November 1983	1
19 November 1983	4	"Never Never"	The Assembly	4	26 November 1983	1
26 November 1983	8	"Love of the Common People"	Paul Young	2	3 December 1983	3
26 November 1983	3	"Calling Your Name"	Marilyn	4	3 December 1983	1
26 November 1983	1	"Thriller"	Michael Jackson	10	26 November 1983	1
3 December 1983	7	"Hold Me Now"	Thompson Twins	4	10 December 1983	1
3 December 1983	5	"Let's Stay Together"	Tina Turner	6	10 December 1983	2
3 December 1983	7	"Only You" (#9)	The Flying Pickets	1	10 December 1983	5
3 December 1983	1	"Right by Your Side"	Eurythmics	10	3 December 1983	1
10 December 1983	5	"My Oh My"	Slade	2	24 December 1983	3
10 December 1983	2	"Move Over Darling"	Tracey Ullman	8	10 December 1983	1
10 December 1983	4	"Please Don't Fall in Love"	Cliff Richard	7	17 December 1983	1
17 December 1983	5	"Victims"	Culture Club	3	24 December 1983	2
17 December 1983	6	"Tell Her About It" ♦	Billy Joel	4	14 January 1984	1
24 December 1983	5	"Marguerita Time" ♦	Status Quo	3	14 January 1984	1
24 December 1983	5	"Islands in the Stream" ♦	Kenny Rogers & Dolly Parton	7	7 January 1984	1

== Entries by artist ==
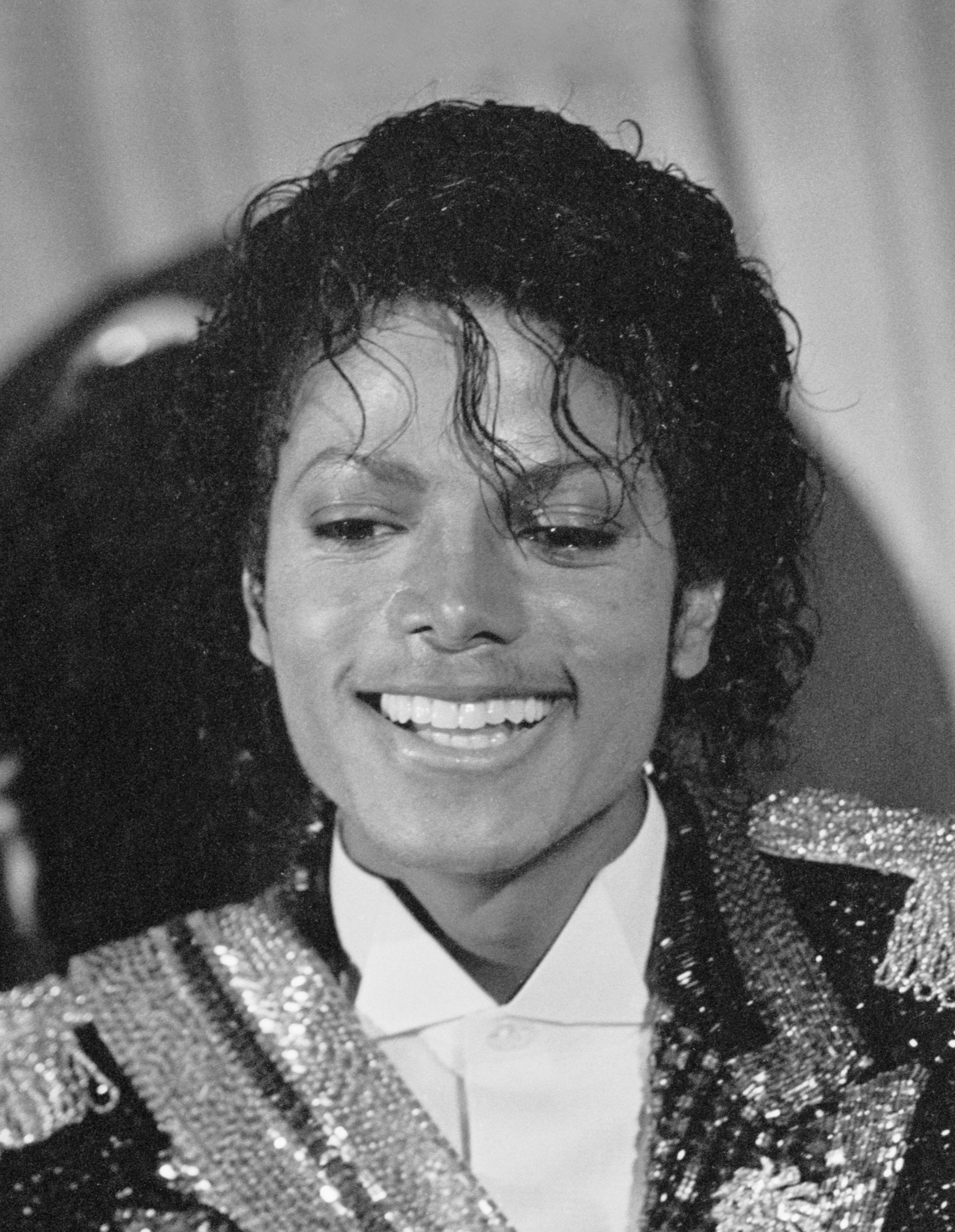
Michael Jackson had five UK top 10 entries this year, the most of any artist. The most successful of these was the number-one hit "Billie Jean", which became the year's eighth best selling single.

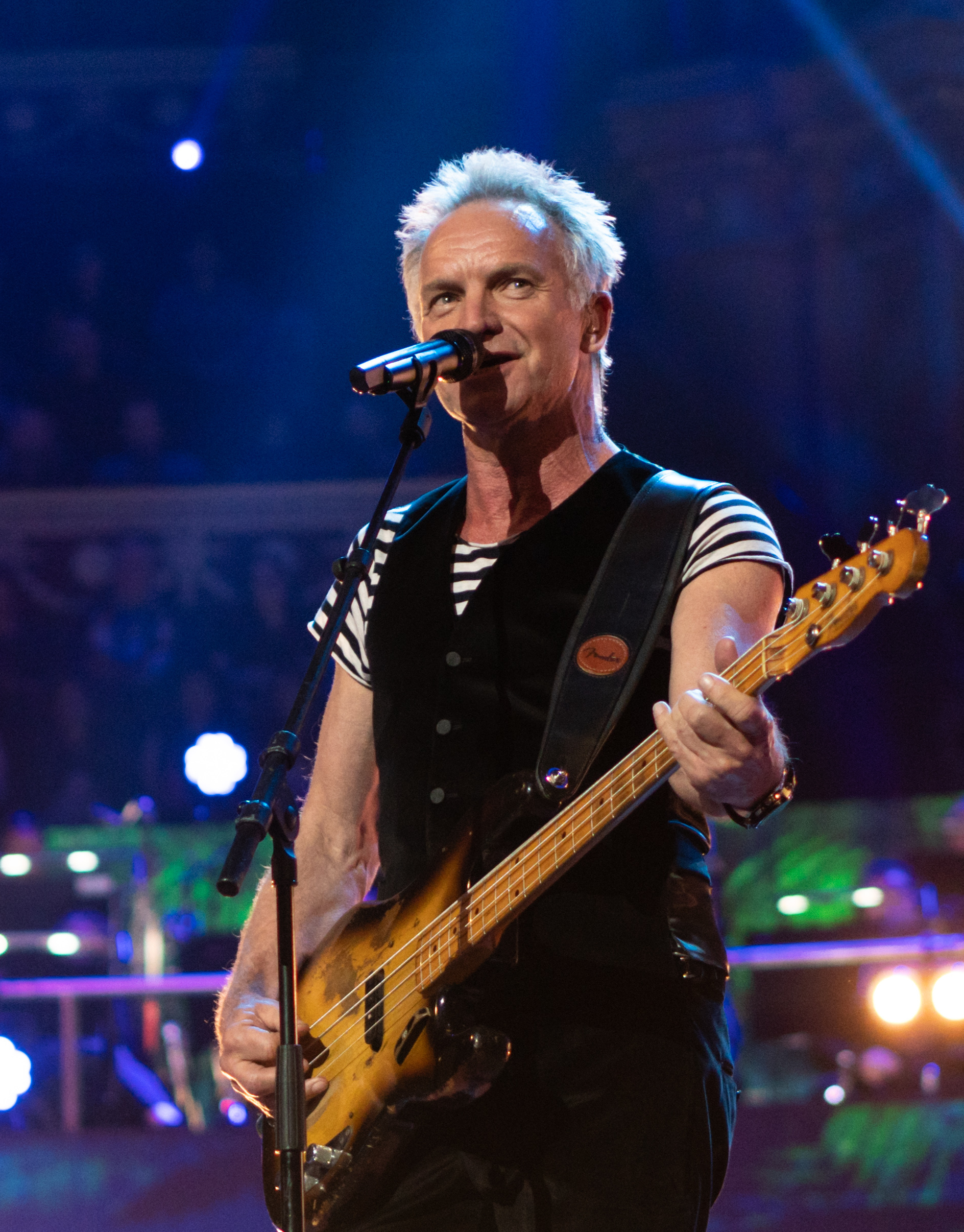
Sting (pictured in 2018) and his band The Police scored two top 10 singles in 1983, including their best-known and most successful song, "Every Breath You Take", which topped the chart for four weeks.

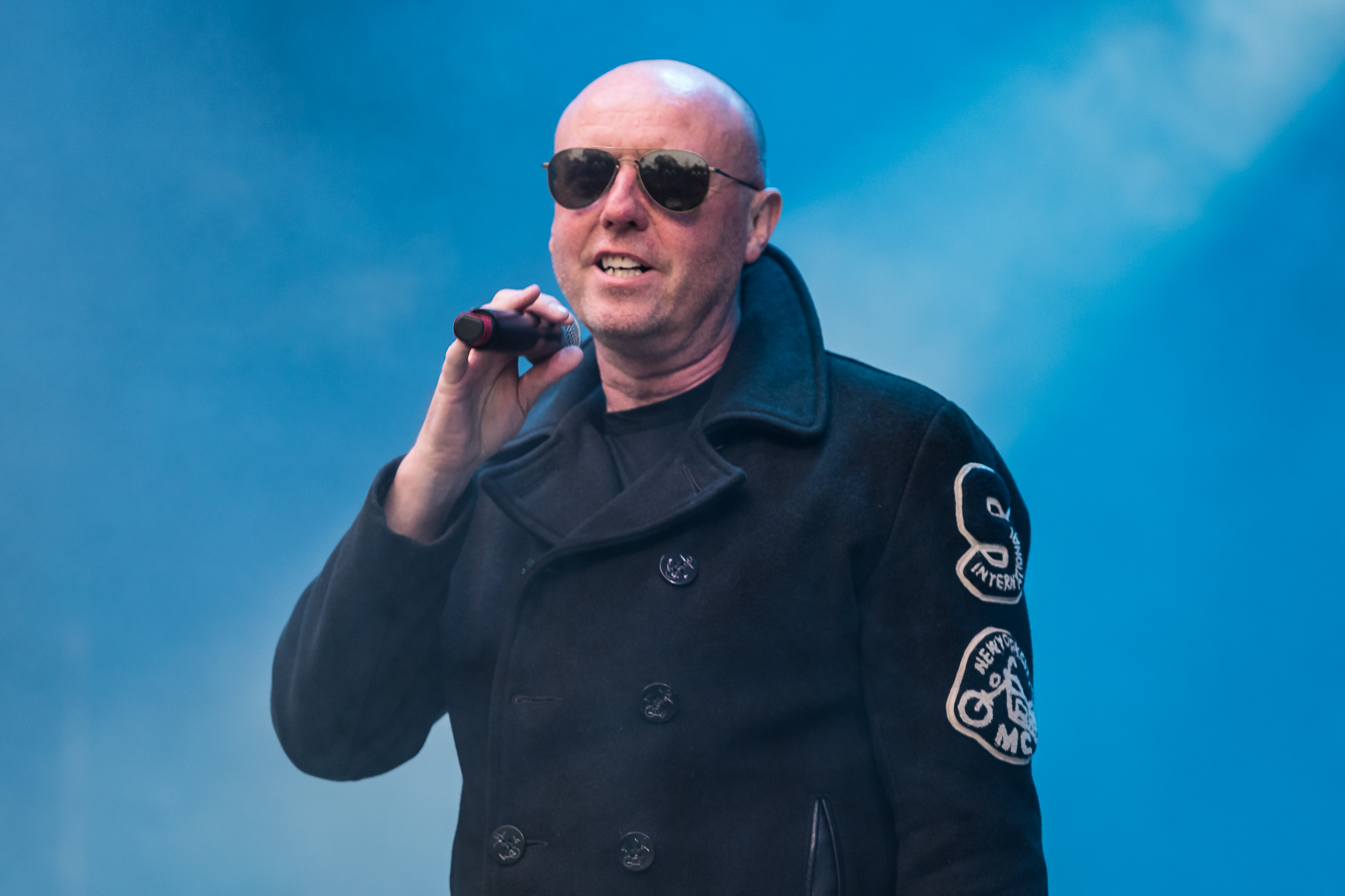
Heaven 17 (band member Glenn Gregory pictured in 2019) achieved two top entries this year, including their biggest hit, "Temptation", which reached number two in May.

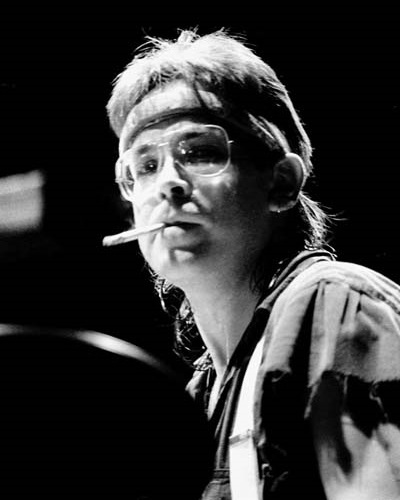
Toto (band member Jeff Porcaro pictured) secured their only UK top 10 hit in 1983 with "Africa", which peaked at number three in February.

The following table shows artists who achieved two or more top 10 entries in 1983, including singles that reached their peak in 1982 or 1984. The figures include both main artists and featured artists, while appearances on ensemble charity records are also counted for each artist. The total number of weeks an artist spent in the top ten in 1983 is also shown.

Entries	Artist	Weeks	Singles
5	Michael Jackson	17	"Beat It", "Billie Jean", "Say Say Say", "Thriller", "Wanna Be Startin' Somethin'"
4	Culture Club ^{[D]}	21	"Church of the Poison Mind", "Karma Chameleon", "Time (Clock of the Heart)", "Victims"
4	David Bowie ^{[D]}	18	"China Girl", "Let's Dance", "Modern Love", "Peace on Earth"/"Little Drummer Boy"
4	Eurythmics	14	"Love Is a Stranger", "Right by Your Side", "Sweet Dreams (Are Made of This)", "Who's That Girl?"
4	Madness ^{[D]}	13	"Our House", "The Sun and the Rain", "Tomorrow's Just Another Day"/"Madness (Is All in the Mind)", "Wings of a Dove"
3	Cliff Richard	6	"Please Don't Fall in Love", "She Means Nothing to Me", "True Love Ways"
3	Kajagoogoo	11	"Big Apple", "Ooh to Be Ah", "Too Shy"
3	Modern Romance ^{[E]}	9	"Best Years of Our Lives", "High Life", "Walking in the Rain"
3	Paul Young	17	"Come Back and Stay", "Love of the Common People", "Wherever I Lay My Hat (That's My Home)"
3	Thompson Twins	10	"Hold Me Now", "Love On Your Side", "We Are Detective"
3	Tracey Ullman	11	"Breakaway", "Move Over Darling", "They Don't Know"
3	Wham!	14	"Bad Boys", "Club Tropicana", "Wham Rap! (Enjoy What You Do)"
2
2	Bananarama	6	"Cruel Summer", "Na Na Hey Hey Kiss Him Goodbye"
2	Big Country	6	"Chance", "Fields of Fire"
2	Billy Joel ^{[F]}	11	"Tell Her About It", "Uptown Girl"
2	Bucks Fizz	3	"If You Can't Stand the Heat", "When We Were Young"
2	David Essex ^{[E]}	6	"A Winter's Tale", "Tahiti"
2	Duran Duran	7	"Is There Something I Should Know?", "Union of the Snake"
2	Elton John	9	"I Guess That's Why They Call It the Blues", "I'm Still Standing"
2	Fun Boy Three	4	"Our Lips Are Sealed", "The Tunnel of Love"
2	Heaven 17	10	"Come Live with Me", "Temptation"
2	JoBoxers	6	"Boxerbeat", "Just Got Lucky"
2	Lionel Richie ^{[D]}	7	"All Night Long (All Night)", "Truly"
2	Malcolm McLaren	7	"Buffalo Gals", "Double Dutch"
2	Phil Collins ^{[E]}^{[G]}	11	"Mama", "You Can't Hurry Love"
2	The Police	9	"Every Breath You Take", "Wrapped Around Your Finger"
2	Rod Stewart	11	"Baby Jane", "What Am I Gonna Do (I'm So in Love with You)"
2	Shakin' Stevens ^{[D]}	6	"Cry Just a Little Bit", "The Shakin' Stevens EP"
2	Spandau Ballet	11	"Gold", "True"
2	Status Quo ^{[F]}	4	"Marguerita Time", "Ol' Rag Blues"
2	The Style Council	8	"Long Hot Summer"/"The Paris Match", "Speak Like a Child"
2	Tears for Fears	7	"Change", "Pale Shelter"
2	UB40	9	"Please Don't Make Me Cry", "Red Red Wine"

== Notes ==
- ^{a} "Tell Her About It" reached its peak of number four on 14 January 1984 (week ending).
- ^{b} "The Crown" is one of the longest songs to ever chart on the UK Singles Chart, with the 12" version having a running time of 10 minutes 35 seconds.
- ^{c} "Say Say Say" re-entered the top 10 at number 3 on 12 November 1983 (week ending) for four weeks.
- ^{d} Figure includes single that peaked in 1982.
- ^{e} Figure includes single that first charted in 1982 but peaked in 1983.
- ^{f} Figure includes single that peaked in 1984.
- ^{g} Figure includes a top 10 hit with the group Genesis.

== See also ==
- 1983 in British music
- List of number-one singles from the 1980s (UK)
