= You Caught Me Out =

Studio album by Tracey Ullman
- Released: November 1984
- Recorded: January – May 1984
- Genre: Pop/Rock
- Length: 43:19
- Label: Stiff
- Producer: Peter Collins

Tracey Ullman chronology
You Broke My Heart in 17 Places (1983)	You Caught Me Out (1984)

Professional ratings
Review scores
Source	Rating
Smash Hits	1/10

You Caught Me Out is the second and final studio album by Tracey Ullman. It was released on Stiff Records in November 1984 throughout Europe. Unlike her 1983 debut album, this album was never released commercially in the United States.

== Background ==
The album contained covers of two Kirsty MacColl songs (who had written and originally recorded Ullman's 1983 smash "They Don't Know"), including the title track and "Terry". MacColl had originally written "Terry" specifically for Ullman to record, but first recorded it herself in 1983 at the behest of the record company (both singers were signed to Stiff Records at the time). Ullman's version, the following year used the same backing track as MacColl's original but simply swapped MacColl's vocals for Ullman's. MacColl also provided backing vocals on the album.

Four singles were taken from the album in the UK. "My Guy's Mad at Me" (a cover of Madness's 1980 hit "My Girl's Mad at Me") peaked at No. 23 in March 1984, while "Sunglasses" (a cover of the 1965 Skeeter Davis hit) peaked at no.18 in August. However, "Helpless" and "Terry" (one of Ullman's two Kirsty MacColl covers on the album) failed to prolong her brief run of Top 40 hits, peaking at No. 61 and No. 81 respectively. "You Caught Me Out" was also released as a single in Japan.

== Reception ==
The album was a critical and commercial failure, peaking at No. 92 on the UK Albums Chart. In a scathing review in Smash Hits magazine, Lisa Anthony gave the album a rare score of 1 out of 10 and opined: "Tracey Ullman has a unique talent for picking the most obscure 1960s B-side and ruining it. Here she trudges through old Dusty Springfield and Tamla Motown songs, amongst others, in a Pinky and Perky voice that isn't a patch on the originals. Frankly, it all seems like a big waste of time."

== Track listing ==
No.	Title	Writer(s)	Length
1.	"You Caught Me Out"	Kirsty MacColl; Pete Briquette; Simon Crowe	3:24
2.	"Little By Little"	Buddy Kaye; Beatrice Verdi	2:26
3.	"Baby I Lied"	Deborah Allen; Rory Michael Bourke; Rafe Van Hoy	4:12
4.	"Terry"	MacColl, Gavin Povey	3:46
5.	"Bad Motorcycle"	Al Brown; Fedrick Williams	2:06
6.	"Loving You Is Easy"	Doug Taylor	3:54
7.	"My Guy"	Mike Barson	2:54
8.	"Sunglasses"	John D. Loudermilk	2:59
9.	"If I Had You"	Andy Davis; Rachmaninoff Quartet	3:31
10.	"Helpless"	Holland-Dozier-Holland	2:39
11.	"Where The Boys Are"	Neil Sedaka; Howard Greenfield	3:28
12.	"Give Him a Great Big Kiss"	George "Shadow" Morton	2:25
13.	"I Know What Boys Like"	Chris Butler	3:30
14.	"I Don't Want Our Loving to Die"	Howard; Blaikley	3:03

German Re-issue on Repertoire Records (1992)
No.	Title	Writer(s)	Length
15.	"Thinking of Running Away"	Tracey Ullman; Collins; Chapman
16.	"Sunglasses - Extended Version"	Loudermilk
17.	"Candy"	Miss Scarlet; Collins; Ullman
18.	"Alone"	Morty Craft; Selma Craft
19.	"Falling In and Out of Love"	Don Snow; Mark Kjeldson
20.	"Helpless (Instrumental)"	Holland-Dozier-Holland

Japanese Re-issue on JVC Victor Records (2006)
No.	Title	Writer(s)	Length
13.	"Candy"	Miss Scarlet; Collins; Ullman
14.	"Sunglasses - Extended Version"	Loudermilk
15.	"Falling In and Out of Love"	Don Snow; Mark Kjeldson
16.	"Helpless - Extended Version"	Holland-Dozier-Holland
17.	"Instrumentally Helpless"	Holland-Dozier-Holland
18.	"I Don't Want Our Loving to Die"	Howard; Blaikley	3:03

== Personnel ==
Musicians

- Andy Richards – keyboards
- B.J. Cole – pedal steel guitar
- Charlie Morgan – drums
- Chris Wyles
- Dave Land
- Deon Estus – bass
- Don Snow – keyboards
- Doug Taylor
- Fred Percer
- Gavin Povey – keyboards
- Geraint Watkins – keyboards, accordion
- Graham Edwards – bass
- Jakko M. Jakszyk – guitar, backing vocals
- Joe Partridge – guitar

Musicians (cont.)

- John Canham
- Judd Lander – harmonica
- Mark Nevin – guitar
- Pandit Dinesh – percussion
- Paul Westwood – bass
- Paul "Wix" Wickens – keyboards
- Richard Edwards – trombone
- Robin Bolt – guitar
- Roger McKew – guitar
- Simon Edwards – bass
- Steve Bloomfield – guitar
- Stewart Curtis
- Terry Williams – drums

Backing vocalists

- Alison Thomas
- Joy Yates
- Katie Kissoon
- Kay Garner
- Kirsty MacColl
- Mandy Dickinson
- Margot Buchanan
- Peter Collins
- Ruby James
- Shirley Lewis

== Chart performance ==
Chart (1984)	Peak position
Norwegian Albums Chart	11
Swedish Albums Chart	13
UK Albums Chart	92
