= Like Gangbusters =

Studio album by JoBoxers
- Released: 1983
- Genres: New wave; pop rock
- Length: 41:59
- Label: RCA
- Producer: Alan Shacklock

JoBoxers chronology
Like Gangbusters (1983)	Skin and Bone (1985)

Singles from Like Gangbusters
- 1. "Boxerbeat" Released: March 1983; 2. "Just Got Lucky" Released: May 1983; 3. "Johnny Friendly" Released: August 1983; 4. "Jealous Love/She's Got Sex" Released: October 1983

Professional ratings
Review scores
Source	Rating
Smash Hits	8/10

Like Gangbusters is the first studio album by British new wave band JoBoxers, first released in 1983 and featuring five chart singles.

The first single "Boxerbeat", the group's anthem, worked its way up the UK charts while the group were the opening act on the Madness 'Rise and Fall' tour, reaching number three. It was kept off the top slot by David Bowie's "Let's Dance" and Duran Duran's "Is There Something I Should Know?".

Their next single, "Just Got Lucky", became an international hit. This single sold over 250,000 copies, made the UK top 10, and cracked the U.S. top 40, reaching No. 36 during November 1983, and has been featured in a number of films including Just My Luck and The 40-Year-Old Virgin.

The third single "Johnny Friendly" is a homage to the Marlon Brando film On The Waterfront. British boxer Frank Bruno appeared in the promotional video for the song.

"Jealous Love"/"She's Got Sex" was released as a double A-side. "Jealous Love" was performed on the UK TV show Loose Talk introduced by the actress Diana Dors in one of her last TV appearances, while "She's Got Sex" was covered on Samantha Fox's double platinum selling album Touch Me (as "He's Got Sex").

== Track listing ==
No.	Title	Writer(s)	Length
1.	"Boxerbeat"	Dave Collard, Dig Wayne, Rob Marche	3:03
2.	"Crosstown Walk Up"	Dave Collard, Dig Wayne	3:02
3.	"Fully Booked"	Clive Powell, Jeffrey Alexander Ryan	3:22
4.	"Not My Night"	Dave Collard, Chris Bostock, Dig Wayne	2:28
5.	"Just Got Lucky"	Chris Bostock, Dig Wayne	4:45
6.	"She's Got Sex"	Dig Wayne, Sean McLusky	2:59
7.	"Curious George"	Dave Collard, Dig Wayne	3:22
8.	"Hide Nor Hair"	Dig Wayne, Sean McLusky	3:13
9.	"Crime of Passion"	Chris Bostock, Dig Wayne	2:46
10.	"Johnny Friendly"	Chris Bostock, Dave Collard, Dig Wayne	5:05

2012 Special edition bonus tracks (Hot Shot Records release)
No.	Title	Writer(s)	Length
11.	"Jealous Love" (12" version)	Bobby Womack, King Curtis	4:11
12.	"Boxerbeat" (single version)	Dave Collard, Dig Wayne, Rob Marche	2:55
13.	"Just Got Lucky" (single version)	Chris Bostock, Dig Wayne	3:44
14.	"Johnny Friendly" (single version)	Chris Bostock, Dave Collard, Dig Wayne	3:56
15.	"Let's Talk About Love"	Dave Collard, Dig Wayne, Sean McLusky	2:50
16.	"Forget Me Love"	Dig Wayne, Vic Godard	2:23
17.	"Why Don't You Do Right (Get Me Some Money Too)"	Joe McCoy	2:29
18.	"She's Got Sex" (12" remix)	Dig Wayne, Sean McLusky	6:55
19.	"Just Got Lucky" (12" remix)	Chris Bostock, Dig Wayne	4:42
20.	"Johnny Friendly" (12" remix)	Chris Bostock, Dave Collard, Dig Wayne	10:02

== Personnel ==
- Dig Wayne – vocals
- Chris Bostock – bass, vocals
- Rob Marche – guitar, vocals
- Dave Collard – keyboards, vocals
- Sean McLusky – drums, vocals

=== Additional personnel ===
- John Wallace – saxophone
- Nick Pentelow – saxophone
