= The Rhythm Sisters =

English acoustic/pop duo

- Origin: Leeds, England
- Genres: Pop, English folk
- Years active: 1987–present
- Labels: Red Rhino, Imaginary, Radio Geronimo
- Members: Mandi Laek, Debi Laek
- Website: rhythmsisters.co.uk

The Rhythm Sisters is an English acoustic/pop duo from Leeds which formed in 1987. The same year, they released the album Road to Roundhay Pier. Sisters Mandi and Debi Laek released their first single, "American Boys", which reached number seven on the UK Independent Chart, alongside guitarists Bill Byford and Chris Halliwell, while touring extensively in the UK and Europe with The Proclaimers. They have used various session musicians and their lineups have included Bruce Foxton from The Jam, Bill Nelson from Be-Bop Deluxe, Chris Bostock from JoBoxers and drummer Steve J Jones, who had worked with a number of artists, including the UK Subs. In 1990, they worked with Nelson on the album Willerby, released the following year. In 2007, they released their final album ‘Tell Me How Long the Boat’s Been Gone’, with Bill Byford, Chris Halliwell, Bruce Foxton, Steve Jones, Chris Bostock and keyboardist Ian Livingstone.

== Discography ==
=== Albums ===
- Road to Roundhay Pier (1987, Red Rhino) - UK Indie #19
- Willerby (1991, Imaginary)
- Tell Me How Long the Boat's Been Gone (2007, Radio Geronimo)

=== Singles ===
- "American Boys" (1987, Oval Records) - UK Indie #7
- "Infotainment" (1991, Imaginary)
