= Chris Bostock =

Englist musician (born 1962)

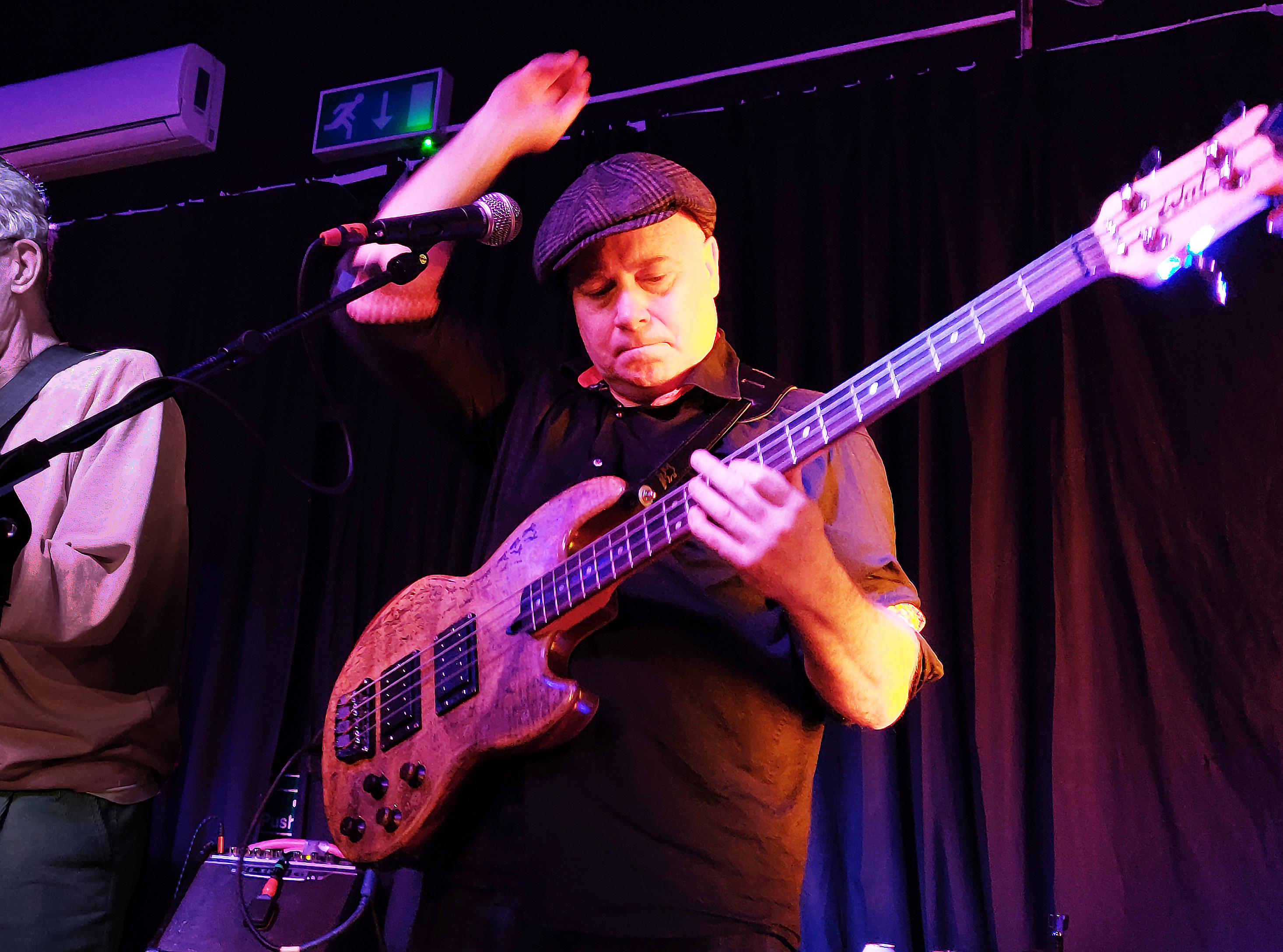

Background information
- Origin: London, England
- Genres: New wave
- Instruments: Bass, keyboards
- Labels: Sony, BMG, RCA, Sanctuary, Heartbeat
- Website: chrisbostock.com

Chris Bostock is an English musician, songwriter and music producer, known for his work with JoBoxers, Subway Sect, Dave Stewart and the Spiritual Cowboys, the Style Council, Spear of Destiny, the X-Certs and the Stingrays.

Bostock has also guested on albums and singles by Shakespears Sister and the Rhythm Sisters, plus live shows and TV appearances with Sandie Shaw, and Daryl Hall & John Oates.

== Career ==
Starting out in Bristol, UK, Bostock studied classical piano from the age of six, taking up the guitar aged 12 and formed his first band the Stingrays in 1978 as bassist and backing vocalist, appearing on the Bristol compilation album Avon Calling before releasing their first single "Countdown", having played numerous shows opening for acts such as the UK Subs and the Undertones. Bostock then joined Bristol band the X-Certs, playing Clash-influenced songs fused with reggae and appearing on The Bristol Recorder 2 compilation album before releasing their own single "Together" while opening for acts such as the Clash and the Associates.

In 1980, Clash/Specials/Dexys/Subway Sect manager Bernard Rhodes, recruited Bostock along with Sean McLusky, Rob Marche and DC Collard to form a group with fellow Bristol musician Johnny Britton. The new band then started touring with Vic Godard in 1981 as the second incarnation of Subway Sect before recording an album Songs for Sale for London Records in 1982. They also ran their weekly Club Left in association with Rhodes at the Whiskey-A-Go-Go in Wardour Street, enabling the band to showcase singers such as New Yorker Dig Wayne, Lady Blue and Bananarama while Johnny Britton set the scene as the house DJ playing his brand of Cool Bop & Swing.

Working with Dig Wayne, the band worked up a set incorporating funk, northern soul, rhythm & blues and ska and became JoBoxers, signing to RCA Records and embarking on a UK tour opening for Madness in 1983. JoBoxers' debut single "Boxerbeat" reached No 3 on the charts while "Just Got Lucky" reached No. 7 in the UK and No. 31 in the US and their album Like Gangbusters went top 20 (UK). Bostock co-wrote the songs "Just Got Lucky", "Johnny Friendly", "Not My Night", "Crime of Passion" and "Is This Really the First Time", among others. The group toured in the UK, US and Australasia. Two more albums were written and recorded: Skin & Bone and Missing Link but the band ran into business obstacles prior to the release of Skin & Bone resulting in some of the Skin & Bone tracks being released but none from Missing Link. All previously unreleased tracks are now available on Just Got Lucky - The Complete Works 1983-1986, released in 2025.

At this time, Paul Weller asked Bostock to play electric and double bass on the Style Council's debut album Café Bleu. In 1986, as admirers of UK singer Sandie Shaw, Bostock, with Marche and McLusky performed as her band on her UK tour plus TV and recording sessions. In 1988, Bostock played on the Spear of Destiny The Price You Pay album and subsequent UK tour. In 1989, Bostock played in The Flame with Roxy Music's Paul Thompson and Supertramp's Dave Winthrop and were signed to Dave Stewart's Anxious Records, opening for Eurythmics and the Beach Boys.

In 1990, after Eurythmics, Dave Stewart invited Bostock to form the Spiritual Cowboys with him, adding members including Martin Chambers from the Pretenders and John Turnbull of the Blockheads. They toured extensively in Europe with the resulting two albums: the self-titled Dave Stewart & the Spiritual Cowboys and Honest, both achieving gold status in France.

In 1992, Bostock produced music for and appeared in the BBC screenplay Bad Girl with actress Jane Horrocks in which she played the singer in his band and this became the forerunner to the film Little Voice in which Horrocks played the singer and focal point of the story. In 1993, Bostock produced the album Savage World for EMI Electrola's Frankfurt signing Savage World. In 1997, he co-produced the album This Hour for country singer Clint Bradley on BMG/M&G Records. In 2012, Bostock was executive producer for the re-released JoBoxers album Like Gangbusters.

Between 1995 and 1997, Bostock was A&R manager for Michael Levy's M&G Records and Wired Recordings. In 2005, the JoBoxers song "Just Got Lucky" featured in the films The 40-Year-Old Virgin and Just My Luck. Bostock worked on the re-release of the JoBoxers albums Essential Boxerbeat (2006) on Sony and Like Gangbusters (2012).

Bostock currently performs in Subway Sect with Vic Godard and former members Sean McLusky and Johnny Britton and JoBoxers, who completed a successful UK tour in summer 2022.

In 2025, Bostock was executive producer for the JoBoxers box set Just Got Lucky - The Complete Works 1983-1986 on Cherry Red Records and for the promotional video for new single "A Thorn in My Side" which reached No. 11 on the Heritage Chart.

== Selected discography ==
=== Subway Sect ===
==== Album ====
- Songs For Sale. (London Records, 1982)
- Moments Like These. (Texte und Töne, 2021)

==== Singles ====
- "Stamp of a Vamp" (Club Left, 1981)
- "Hey Now I’m in Love" (London - 1981)
- "How High The Walls?" (GNU Inc - 2019)
- "Gypsy Woman" (GNU Inc - 2020)

=== JoBoxers ===
==== Albums ====
- Like Gangbusters (RCA, 1983) UK No. 18 (re-released in 2023)
- Skin and Bone (RCA, 1985)
- Essential Boxerbeat (BMG, 1996)
- Doing The Boxerbeat - The Anthology (Sanctuary, 2003)
- Essential Boxerbeat (Reissue, Sony BMG, 2006)
- Like Gangbusters (Expanded Edition) Hot Shot Records, (2012)
- Just Got Lucky - The Complete Works 1983-1986 (Cherry Red Records 2025)

==== Singles ====
- "Boxerbeat" (RCA, 1983) UK No. 3
- "Just Got Lucky" (RCA, 1983) UK No. 7, US No. 36
- "Johnny Friendly" (RCA, 1983) UK No. 31
- "Jealous Love"/"She's Got Sex"" (RCA, 1983) UK No. 72
- "Is This Really the First Time" (RCA, 1985)
- "A Thorn in My Side" (Cherry Red, 2025)

=== Spear of Destiny ===
==== Album ====
- The Price You Pay (Virgin, 1988)
- Best of - Live at The Forum (Rough Trade, 2023)

==== Singles ====
- "So in Love With You" (Virgin, 1989)
- "Radio Radio" (Virgin, 1988)

=== Albums ===
- Dave Stewart and the Spiritual Cowboys (BMG, 1990) – UK #38, AUS #51, NED #50, NOR #20, SWE #9
- Honest (BMG, 1991) – NED #86, SWE #49

==== Singles ====
- "Jack Talking" (BMG, 1990)
- "Love Shines" (BMG, 1991)

=== Shakespears Sister ===
==== Single ====
- "Goodbye Cruel World" (London, 1992). Also appears on the album: Hormonally Yours.

=== Savage World ===
==== Album ====
- Savage World (EMI Electrola, 1993)

==== Single ====
- "Everybody" (EMI Electrola, 1993)

=== Clint Bradley ===
==== Album ====
- This Hour (BMG Germany, 1997)

=== Amina ===
==== Album ====
- Annabi (Mercury, 1999)

=== The Rhythm Sisters ===
==== Album ====
- Tell Me How long The Boat's Been Gone (Radio Geronimo, 2007)

=== Johnny Britton ===
==== Album ====
- Johnny Britton (Exhilaration, 2018)
