= The Bitter Springs =

English rock band

- Also known as: Last Party
- Origin: Teddington, London, England
- Genre: Alternative rock
- Years active: 1985–present
- Labels: Harvey, Dishy, Idol
- Members: Simon Rivers; Andrew Deevey; Paul Baker; Paul McGrath; Phil Martin; Nick Brown
- Past members: Kim Ashford; Daniel Ashkenazy; Neil Palmer; Steve Infield; Andy Gwatkin; Ollie Cherer; Jack Hayter
- Website: bittersprings.com

The Bitter Springs are an English rock group from the London suburb of Teddington. The band evolved from Last Party, who had formed in 1985, with the name changing in 1996. The band have released two albums as Last Party, and six as The Bitter Springs and also played with Vic Godard as Subway Sect, on and off for nine years.

== History ==
Last Party formed in 1985, although their history stretches back to the band No Trains At The Bay, which the members formed at school in 1978, and who had a song called "The Last Party". One of their earliest gigs was in support of The Sound, their original drummer Steve Infield being a housemate of The Sound's bass player Graham Bailey. They released their debut album on their own Harvey label the following year. They were the support act at The Stone Roses' first London gig, at the Greyhound in Fulham, and were favourites with John Peel, recording two sessions for his BBC Radio 1 show, one in 1987 and a second in 1989. In 1995, the band members at the time (singer Simon Rivers, bass player Daniel Ashkenazy, Kim Ashford, and Neil Palmer) decided on a new name, The Bitter Springs, changing their name "in the hope that journalists who had ignored the Last Party would give us another listen". The debut release under this new name, the Addison Brothers EP, featured Vic Godard, and the Bitter Springs enjoyed a long association with Godard, acting as his backing band, the Subway Sect, for nine years, also contributing to studio recordings including Godard's Blackpool album, where Godard and the Bitter Springs provide musical backing to lyrics by Irvine Welsh. The Bitter Springs themselves have released six studio albums, including Benny Hill's Wardrobe, which was "album of the month" in MOJO and rated at 4.5 out of 5 by Melody Maker, the latest being That Sentimental Slush in 2006, described as "an exhilirating [sic], exuberant bomb blast of an album". Allmusic's Stewart Mason described the album as "entirely typical of the band's output, showing both their strengths and weaknesses", and noted Rivers' "wry sense of humor and an eye for romantic futility". Lyricist and singer Simon Rivers has also performed solo, the first time in 2007 supporting The Band of Holy Joy.

== Discography ==
=== Singles ===
==== As Last Party ====
- "Mr. Hurst" (1987) Harvey
- "Tree Shada" (1987) Idol
- "Damp" (1998) Idol
- "Die In a Spy Ring" (1989) Idol
- "Black Leather Sheets" (1992) Bilberry
- "Creature Lake" (1993) Harvey
- "UCIT" (1994) Dishy
- Contrast Split Single Club Vol.2 (1994) Contrast (track: "Fix Me")
- "Selective Memory" (1995) Dishy

==== As The Bitter Springs ====
- Addison Brothers EP (1996) Vespertine
- "Absence Makes the Hair Grow Blonder" (1997) Trade 2
- "It's Business" (1997) Wurlitzer Jukebox
- Barbara EP (1998) Dishy
- "A Good Provider" (1998) Debut - joint single with Esposito
- "Manners, Pianos, Mouthorgans" (1998) Amberley
- Stop The World EP (2001) Acuarela
- Poor Trace EP (2006) Harvey
- Firm Family Favourites EP (2006) Harvey
- "And Even Now" (2009) - digital download
- "My Life as a Dog in a Pigsty" (2010) - digital download
- "TV Tears" (2010) - digital download
- "Gary Glitter Fan Convention" (2011) - digital download
- "Snowflakes in June" (2011) - digital download
- "Something Good Together/Portrait Of A Marriage" (2015) - 7" Acuarela Records
- "The Hounslow Solicitors" (2015) - digital download

=== Albums ===
==== As Last Party ====
- Porky's Range (1986) Harvey
- Love Handles (1990) Harvey
- Cacophony on Port Hampton - Singles and Rarities 1985 - 1995 (2008) (digital download only)

==== As The Bitter Springs ====
- From The Parish of Arthritis (1997) Dishy
- Five Die Filming This Lazy Lark (1998) Vespertine
- Benny Hill's Wardrobe (1999) Vespertine
- The Best Bakers on the Island - El Grande Espanol (2000) Acuarela (compilation of Last Party and Bitter Springs tracks)
- The Suburban Crimes of Every Happiness (2001) Dishy
- That Sentimental Slush (2006) Harvey
- Everyone's Cup of Tea (2013) Harvey
- Cuttlefish And Love's Remains (2015) Harvey

=== Compilation appearances ===
- Les Inrockuptibles - French Magazine CD - "Hell's Angel"
- Les Inrockuptibles - French Magazine CD - "Christmas #1"
