= Manta Ray (album) =

Studio album by Nan Vernon
- Released: 1994
- Recorded: 1992–1993
- Genre: Alternative rock
- Length: 53:05
- Label: Anxious
- Producer: Dave Stewart, Phill Brown, Chris Sheehan, Clive Martin, Olle Romo, Ian Stanley, Lawrence Dunmore, Nan Vernon

Professional ratings
Review scores
Source	Rating
AllMusic	4.5/5 stars

Manta Ray is the debut album by Canadian singer-songwriter Nan Vernon, released in 1994. It is her only full-length album released by Anxious Records.

== Track listing ==
No.	Title	Writer(s)	Length
1.	"Motorcycle"	Matthew Seligman, Nan Vernon	4:26
2.	"Tattoo Tears"	Vernon	5:13
3.	"Elvis Waits"	James Hallawell, Vernon	4:23
4.	"No More Lullabyes"	Vernon	4:10
5.	"Big Picture"	Vernon	6:00
6.	"Lay Down Joe"	Chris Sheehan, Vernon	3:04
7.	"While My Guitar Gently Weeps"	George Harrison	4:55
8.	"Iron John"	Jonathan Perkins, Vernon	4:22
9.	"Treasure"	Vernon	4:03
10.	"Fisherman"	Vernon	4:03
11.	"Johnny's Birthday"	Vernon	2:51
12.	"Manta Ray"	Perkins, Vernon	5:35
Total length:			53:05

Notes

- All the tracks were produced by Dave Stewart who was credited as 'B.B. Watkins'.
- "Johnny's Birthday" is sung in German.
- "Manta Ray" includes a hidden part of sinister children's laughter near the end.

== Personnel ==
- Nan Vernon

with:

- Chris Sheehan - guitar on "Lay Down Joe" and "Manta Ray"
- Alex Gifford - saxophone on "Motorcycle"

== Promotion ==
A single "No More Lullabyes" and its music video were released in 1992. A cover version of "While My Guitar Gently Weeps" was released in 1993, and music videos for singles "Motorcycle" and "Elvis Waits" were released in 1994.
