= Honest (Dave Stewart and the Spiritual Cowboys album) =

Studio album by Dave Stewart and the Spiritual Cowboys
- Released: 1991
- Label: BMG Records
- Producer: David A. Stewart

Dave Stewart and the Spiritual Cowboys chronology
Dave Stewart and the Spiritual Cowboys (1990)	Honest (1991)

Professional ratings
Review scores
Source	Rating
AllMusic	4/5 stars
NME	2/10

Honest is a 1991 album by Dave Stewart and the Spiritual Cowboys. It was Stewart's second and final album with the Pretenders' Martin Chambers after Annie Lennox left the Eurythmics to start a family.

== Track listing ==
All tracks composed by Dave Stewart; except where indicated

1. "Honest"
2. "Whole Wide World"
3. "Crown of Madness"
4. "Out of Reach" (music: Nan Vernon)
5. "You're Lost"
6. "Fools Paradise"
7. "Motorcycle Mystics"
8. "Impossible"
9. "Here We Go Again"
10. "Here She Comes"
11. "Fade Away" (music and lyrics: Jonathan Perkins)
12. "Cat with a Tale"
13. "R.U. Satisfied"

== Personnel ==
- Dave Stewart — lead vocals, guitar
- Nan Vernon — backing vocals, guitar
- John Turnbull — guitar, backing vocals
- Jonathan Perkins — keyboards, backing vocals
- Chris Bostock — bass, backing vocals
- Martin Chambers — drums, backing vocals
- Olle Romo — drums, drum programming

with:

- Shankar — violin on "You're Lost"
- Ruby Zimmermoon — harmonica on "Here She Comes"
- Beverlei Brown, Carol Kenyon, Pamela Beckford, Valerie Chalmers — backing vocals on "R.U. Satisfied"

Technical

- Manu Guiot — engineer, mixing
- Alan Moulder — mixing on "Fools Paradise"
