= Douglas Taylor =

Douglas Taylor or Doug Taylor may refer to:

- Douglas D. Taylor, entrepreneur and academic researcher in the field of extracellular vesicles
- Douglas Graham Taylor (1936–2009), educator, farmer and political figure in Saskatchewan
- Doug Taylor (historian) (1938–2020), Canadian historian, professor and author
