= Vic Godard =

- Born: Victor John Napper; Mortlake, London, England
- Genres: Punk rock
- Occupation: Singer-songwriter
- Years active: 1976–1985, 1990–present
- Labels: Rough Trade, London, Postcard
- Formerly of: Subway Sect
- Website: The official web site of Vic Godard & Subway Sect

Vic Godard (born Victor John Napper) is an English singer-songwriter formerly of the punk group Subway Sect. He is now also a solo performer, while continuing to appear with various incarnations of Subway Sect.

== Biography ==
Born Victor John Napper in Mortlake, Surrey, Godard was raised in nearby Barnes, London.

In 1976, Godard formed Subway Sect with three other fans of the Sex Pistols at the suggestion of Sex Pistols manager Malcolm McLaren, who wanted another band for the line-up of the 100 Club Punk Festival. Despite their inexperience, Subway Sect made a successful debut at the festival and were taken on by Clash manager Bernie Rhodes. They appeared with The Clash on the White Riot Tour in 1977 and released their debut single, "Nobody's Scared"/"Don't Split It", in March 1978. While recording their debut album at Gooseberry Studios, Rhodes suddenly fired the entire band except for Godard. Two tracks from the album's recording sessions, "Ambition"/"Different Story", were released by Rough Trade Records; the single was a major hit on the alternative charts.

Godard re-formed Subway Sect in 1980 with new musicians and signed to MCA Records sublabel Oddball, releasing the album What's The Matter Boy? Following a summer tour with Buzzcocks, Subway Sect disbanded again. Guitarist Johnny Britten formed a rockabilly band with Chris Bostock, Sean McLusky, Rob Marche and DC Collard, but was soon forced to leave the group, at which point Godard stepped in to take his place. They recorded the album Songs For Sale in 1981, but were disappointed with the results and disbanded soon after; members of the band, without Godard, went on to form JoBoxers. Godard also recorded an LP at Olympic Studios, called T.R.O.U.B.L.E., with a group of London jazz musicians known as Working Week, which was eventually released two years later by Rough Trade Records.

In the mid-1980s, Godard retired from music and became a postman.

In 1990, Godard wrote the song "Johnny Thunders", a tribute inspired by reading an obituary of the New York Dolls guitarist. It was recorded at the home of Paul Baker, a fellow postman. Godard also recorded ten other tracks and the recordings, with Paul Cook on drums, eventually became the album The End of the Surrey People. Produced by Edwyn Collins, it was released on the Postcard Records label. Collins' group Orange Juice had made the Subway Sect song "Holiday Hymn" a feature of their set in the early 1980s.

Later in the 1990s, Godard formed the band The Long Decline with Kenny Wisdom and Mark Perry. The band released an album on the Overground label before disbanding in 1998, but re-formed in 2000 with Godard, Wisdom, Lee McFadden, and Mina Sassoon, among others. Godard contributed guitar and some songwriting, but not lead vocals,

In 1998, Godard released the album Long Term side-Effect on Tugboat Records.

A 2002 album recorded by Godard, Sansend, was released under the name Subway Sect, rather than his own.

Godard's label Motion Records released Singles Anthology in 2005, compiling all the A-sides and B-sides from Godard's career.

In 2007, as Subway Sect, Godard recorded the songs that had been intended for the debut LP back in 1978, and released them as 1978 Now. The line-up includes original drummer Mark Laff as well as original bass player Paul Myers on some tracks.

Godard has also contributed to tracks by The Bitter Springs, who acted as his backing band (as Subway Sect) for nine years.

In 2009, Godard recorded We Come As Aliens for Overground records (with a vinyl edition on GNU Inc) with Subway Sect, as well as an EP with Trainspotting author Irvine Welsh called Blackpool.

2012 saw Godard & Subway Sect touring the UK & Europe extensively, while also recording 1979 Now with Edwyn Collins. 2013 included a collaborative tour with the Sexual Objects (featuring Davy Henderson of The Fire Engines) and two BBC sessions with Marc Riley. He released the 7" only single "Caught in Midstream" / "(You Bring Out) The Demon in Me".

2014 began with the release of 30 Odd Years a 45-track box-set on Godard's own GNU Inc records. Godard remains a busy artist, but no more popular than he was 40 years ago.

== Discography ==
=== Vic Godard and Subway Sect ===
==== Albums ====
- What's the Matter Boy? (1980), Oddball/MCA
- Songs For Sale (1982), London
- We Come As Aliens (2010), Overground
- 1979 Now! (2014), Gnu

Compilations

- A Retrospective (1977–81) (1985), Rough Trade
- Twenty Odd Years – The Story of... (1999), Motion
- Singles Anthology (2005), Motion
- Live in Stereo (2009), GNU Inc
- Peel Sessions (2011), GNU Inc
- Live + Rare Vol 2 (2012) GNU Inc
- 30 Odd Years (2014), GNU Inc

==== Singles ====
- "Split Up the Money" (1980), Oddball/MCA
- "Stop That Girl" (1981), Rough Trade
- "Stamp of a Vamp" (1981), Club Left
- "Hey Now (I'm in Love)" (1982), London
- "Johnny Thunders" (1992), Rough Trade
- "Won't Turn Back" (1993), Postcard
- "No Love Now" (1996), Garcia [as 'Spirit of the Sect']
- "Place We Used to Love" (1999), Creeping Bent
- "Caught in Midstream" (2013), AED

=== Vic Godard ===
==== Albums ====
- T.R.O.U.B.L.E. (1986), Rough Trade
- End of the Surrey People (1993), Postcard
- Long Term side-Effect (1998), Tugboat
- In T.R.O.U.B.L.E. Again (2002), Tugboat

==== Singles ====
- "Holiday Hymn" (1985), El
- "Blackpool" (2010), GNU Inc [as 'Vic Godard & Irvine Welsh']
- "Better Not Turn On", download (2012) [with Georgio Valentino]
- "Vic to Vic" (2013), Famelic [with Mates Mates]
