= Dave Stewart and the Spiritual Cowboys =

English pop-rock band

- Origin: London, England; based in Paris, France
- Genres: Pop, rock
- Years active: 1990–91
- Labels: BMG, Arista

Dave Stewart and the Spiritual Cowboys was an English rock and pop band, formed in 1990 after frontman David A. Stewart's departure from Eurythmics. Chris Bostock from JoBoxers, Jonathan Perkins, Olle Romo and Nan Vernon were later joined by Martin Chambers from The Pretenders and John Turnbull from Ian Dury and The Blockheads. They made two albums: the self-titled Dave Stewart and the Spiritual Cowboys and Honest. Their live stage act is characterized by spiritual icons and a unique double drum kit played by two drummers.

== Discography ==
=== Albums ===
- Dave Stewart and the Spiritual Cowboys (BMG, 1990) – UK #38, AUS #51, NED #50, NOR #20, SWE #9
- Honest (BMG, 1991) – AUS #187, NED #86, SWE #49
- Live at Rockpalast - Köln 1990 (2016; 1 DVD + 2 CD)

=== Singles ===
Year	Single	Peak positions						Album
Year	Single	UK	AUS	BEL (FL)	FRA	GER	NED	Album
1990	"Jack Talking"	69	57	44	29	49	33	Dave Stewart and the Spiritual Cowboys
1990	"Party Town" (US only)	—	—	—	—	—	—	Dave Stewart and the Spiritual Cowboys
1990	"Love Shines"	88	144	49	—	—	—	Dave Stewart and the Spiritual Cowboys
1991	"On Fire"	—	—	—	—	—	—	Dave Stewart and the Spiritual Cowboys
1991	"Crown of Madness"	—	192	—	—	—	—	Honest
1991	"Out of Reach"	—	—	—	—	—	—	Honest
"—" denotes releases that did not chart or were not released.
