= You Broke My Heart in 17 Places =

Studio album by Tracey Ullman
- Released: 25 November 1983
- Recorded: 1982 – 1983
- Genres: New wave; pop
- Length: 31:35
- Labels: Stiff (United Kingdom); MCA (United States)
- Producer: Peter Collins

Tracey Ullman chronology
You Broke My Heart in 17 Places (1983)	You Caught Me Out (1984)

Professional ratings
Review scores
Source	Rating
AllMusic	4.5/5 stars
Smash Hits	8/10

You Broke My Heart in 17 Places is the debut studio album by the British-American actress Tracey Ullman, released in 1983. It peaked at No. 14 on the UK Albums chart and No. 34 in the spring of 1984 on the Billboard 200 in the United States. It was certified Silver by the BPI for sales in excess of 60,000 copies. The album contained three UK Top Ten hit singles, including Ullman's first hit, "Breakaway".

The album consists of cover versions, such as Doris Day's "Move Over Darling" (UK No. #8) and Blondie's "(I'm Always Touched by Your) Presence, Dear". "They Don't Know"—originally written, recorded, and released by singer Kirsty MacColl—became Ullman's biggest hit, reaching No. 2 in the UK and No. 8 on the U.S. Billboard Hot 100. The song's music video included a cameo appearance by Paul McCartney, with whom Ullman would appear with in McCartney's film Give My Regards to Broad Street (1984).

== Track listing ==
=== UK Stiff Records LP ===
Side one
No.	Title	Writer(s)	Length
1.	"Breakaway"	Jackie DeShannon; Sharon Sheeley	2:36
2.	"Long Live Love"	Chris Andrews	2:48
3.	"Shattered"	Wayne Carson Thompson	2:44
4.	"Oh, What a Night"	Marvin Junior; Johnny Funches	2:33
5.	"Life Is a Rock (But the Radio Rolled Me)"	Norman Dolph	3:18

Side two
No.	Title	Writer(s)	Length
1.	"Move Over Darling"	Joe Lubin; Terry Melcher; Hal Kanter	2:32
2.	"Bobby's Girl"	Henry Hoffman; Gary Klein	2:58
3.	"They Don't Know"	Kirsty MacColl	2:59
4.	"(I'm Always Touched by Your) Presence, Dear"	Gary Valentine	2:45
5.	"You Broke My Heart in 17 Places"	MacColl	2:52
6.	"I Close My Eyes and Count to Ten"	Clive Westlake	3:30

=== US MCA Records LP ===
Side one
No.	Title	Writer(s)	Length
1.	"Breakaway"	Jackie DeShannon; Sharon Sheeley	2:36
2.	"They Don't Know"	Kirsty MacColl	2:59
3.	"Bobby's Girl"	Henry Hoffman; Gary Klein	2:58
4.	"Oh, What a Night"	Marvin Junior; Johnny Funches	2:33
5.	"Move Over Darling"	Joe Lubin; Terry Melcher; Hal Kanter	2:32

Side two
No.	Title	Writer(s)	Length
1.	"I Close My Eyes and Count to Ten"	Clive Westlake	3:30
2.	"Long Live Love"	Chris Andrews	2:48
3.	"(I'm Always Touched by Your) Presence Dear"	Gary Valentine	2:45
4.	"Shattered"	Wayne Carson Thompson	2:44
5.	"You Broke My Heart in 17 Places"	MacColl	2:52
6.	"Life Is a Rock (But the Radio Rolled Me)"	Norman Dolph	3:18

==== 1991 Repertoire Records CD bonus tracks ====
No.	Title	Writer(s)	Length
12.	"Dancing in the Dark"	Peter Collins; Phil Chapman	2:54
13.	"Breakaway (Monitor Mix)"	Jackie DeShannon; Shari Sheeley	4:58
14.	"Bobby's Girl (Remix)"	Gary Klein; Henry Hoffman	2:58
15.	"Move Over Darling (Extended)"	Hal Kantner; Joe Lubin; Terry Melcher	4:22
16.	"The B-Side"	Kim Fuller; Tracey Ullman	4:36

==== 1992 Rhino Records CD bonus tracks ====
In 1992, the album was included in its entirety on the Rhino Records compilation The Best of Tracey Ullman: You Broke My Heart in 17 Places, along with nine additional tracks, seven of which were from her second studio album You Caught Me Out along with two B-sides.

No.	Title	Writer(s)	Length
12.	"You Caught Me Out"	MacColl; Pete Briquette; Simon Crowe	3:27
13.	"Baby I Lied"	Deborah Allen; Rory Michael Bourke; Rafe Van Hoy	4:15
14.	"Terry"	MacColl; Gavin Povey	3:49
15.	"Sunglasses"	John D. Loudermilk	3:03
16.	"Helpless"	Holland-Dozier-Holland	2:44
17.	"My Guy"	Mike Barson	3:00
18.	"Falling In and Out of Love"	Mark Kjeldsen; Don Snow	3:17
19.	"I Don't Want Our Loving to Die"	Howard; Blaikley	3:03
20.	"Dancing in the Dark"	Peter Collins; Phil Chapman	2:53

==== 2006 Stiff/Victor CD bonus tracks ====
No.	Title	Writer(s)	Length
12.	"Dancing in the Dark"	Peter Collins; Phil Chapman	2:54
13.	"The B-Side"	Kim Fuller; Tracey Ullman	4:36
14.	"Move Over Darling (Extended)"	Hal Kantner; Joe Lubin; Terry Melcher	4:22
15.	"My Guy"	Mike Barson	3:00
16.	"Thinking of Running Away"	Peter Collins; Phil Chapman; Tracey Ullman	2:03

== Personnel ==
- Tracey Ullman – vocals
- Kirsty MacColl – backing vocals, producer ("You Broke My Heart in 17 Places")
- The Sapphires – backing vocals
- Flying Pickets – backing vocals
- Rosemary Robinson – backing vocals
- Miriam Stockley – backing vocals
- Clare Torry – backing vocals
- Wealthy Tarts – backing vocals
- Hank Marvin – guitar ("Move Over Darling" and "You Broke My Heart in 17 Places")
- Peter Collins – producer (except "You Broke My Heart in 17 Places" and "Bobby's Girl") for Loose End Productions
- Steve O'Donnell – producer ("Bobby's Girl") for Malpas Productions
- Gavin Povey – producer ("You Broke My Heart in 17 Places")
- Barry Farmer, Gavin Povey, John Burns, Julian Mendelsohn, MD-Wix, Phil Chapman, Phil Harding – engineer

== Certifications ==
Certifications for You Broke My Heart in 17 Places
Region	Certification	Certified units/sales
United Kingdom (BPI)	Silver	60,000^{^}
^{^} Shipments figures based on certification alone.
