= Just Got Lucky =

Single by JoBoxers

from the album Like Gangbusters
- B-side: "Crosstown Walkup"
- Released: 9 May 1983
- Recorded: 1982
- Genre: New wave; blue-eyed soul
- Length: 4:42 (12"); 3:44 (single version)
- Label: RCA
- Songwriters: Chris Bostock; Dig Wayne
- Producer: Alan Shacklock

JoBoxers singles chronology
"Boxerbeat" (1983)	"Just Got Lucky" (1983)	"Johnny Friendly" (1983)

Music videos
- "Just Got Lucky" on YouTube

"Just Got Lucky" is a song recorded by the British band JoBoxers, released in May 1983, through RCA Records. The track was initially released on the band's debut album, Like Gangbusters (1983). The song reached the top ten in the UK, and the top 40 in the United States that autumn. It was later included on the band's compilation albums, Essential Boxerbeat (1996, later re-released in 2006) and Doing the Boxerbeat - The Anthology (2003).

== Chart history ==
Chart (1982–1983)	Peak position
Australia (Kent Music Report)	25
Canada RPM Top Singles	30
Ireland (IRMA)	13
UK Singles Chart	7
US Billboard Hot 100	36
US Cash Box Top 100	40
