= Breakaway (Irma Thomas song) =

Single by Tracey Ullman

from the album You Broke My Heart In 17 Places
- Released: 21 February 1983
- Recorded: August 1982
- Genre: Pop
- Label: Stiff Records
- Songwriters: Jackie DeShannon, Sharon Sheeley
- Producer: Peter Collins

Tracey Ullman singles chronology
"Breakaway" (1983)	"They Don't Know" (1983)

"Breakaway" is a song written by Jackie DeShannon and Sharon Sheeley. It was originally recorded by Irma Thomas in 1964 (stylised as Break-A-Way) and released as the B-side of her biggest hit, the US No. 17 single "Wish Someone Would Care". The song was later a huge success for the British singer Tracey Ullman, who had a UK Top 5 hit with it in 1983. A demo version performed by DeShannon was also recorded but remained unreleased until a 1994 compilation.

"Breakaway" is today generally a better-remembered song than the A-side of Thomas' record, largely due to Ullman's 1983 hit cover of the song. It has become a staple in Thomas' live performances and appears on several later Irma Thomas and "New Orleans music" compilations.

"Breakaway" was Tracey Ullman's debut single, released in the UK in February 1983. By April, it had reached No. 4 on the UK Singles Chart. The track then appeared on Ullman's UK Top 20 album You Broke My Heart in 17 Places, which was released in November 1983.

In North America, "Breakaway" was actually Ullman's second single, being released after her Top 10 hit "They Don't Know" (which was Ullman's second single in the UK). "Breakaway" charted at No. 70 in the US in 1984, although the video for Ullman's version received significant play on the then-fledgling MTV and Canada's MuchMusic.

The song's lyrics speak of the singer's inability to find the strength to leave a relationship, and describe a situation where the song's first person protagonist is repeatedly on the verge of running away from the bad situation, only to find at the last moment she does not have the strength of will to follow through.

== Other versions ==
Italian pre-teen pop-singer Piccola Pupa performed a cover of the song for her debut self-titled album in 1964, and performed the song on variety shows such as Hollywood a Go-Go and Shindig! in 1965.

British singer Beryl Marsden recorded a cover version of this song in 1965, for Columbia Records.

In 2010, a version of the song by the Detroit Cobras was used in commercials for the NFL RedZone channel.
