= Douglas D. Taylor =

Douglas D. Taylor is an entrepreneur and former academic researcher in the field of extracellular vesicles.

Taylor attained a bachelor's degree from the University of Richmond and a Ph.D. from Wake Forest University. He was a post-doctoral fellow at Boston University. Taylor was a professor and Vice Chair for Research in the Department of Obstetrics, Gynecology, and Women's Healthheld at the University of Louisville in Kentucky. He was also on the faculty of the University of California, Davis. From 2013 to 2015, he was the Chief Scientific Officer of Aethlon Medical's wholly owned subsidiary, Exosome Sciences.

Taylor first described exosomes in the 1980s, originally believing them to be cell fragments. He later wrote in a now retracted paper that exosomes could potentially be used as biomarkers for profiling in ovarian cancer biopsies, and could extend their utility to screening other asymptomatic areas. What constitutes exosomes has not been defined; specifically, markers of exosomes do not exist.

In 2015, the Journal of Immunology retracted a paper it published in 2006 and which Taylor had co-written after an "institutional research misconduct investigation committee determined that multiple figures in the...paper were falsified". Taylor responded to the retraction on the blog Retraction Watch, disputing various aspects of the retraction, and stating that he sent "copies of the original data so that the [journal's] editor could independently verify that no falsification or fabrication occurred".
