= Subway Sect =

British punk band

- Origin: London, England
- Genres: Punk rock, post-punk
- Years active: 1976–1982, 2002–present
- Members: Vic Godard; Chris Bostock; Sean McLusky; Johnny Britton
- Past members: Rob Symmons; Paul Packham; Mark Laff; Bob Ward; Rob Marche; Dave Collard; Paul Myers; Kevin Younger; Mark Braby; Paul Cook
- Website: www.vicgodard.co.uk

Subway Sect were one of the first British punk bands. Although their commercial success was limited by the small amount of recorded material they released, they have been credited as highly influential on the Postcard Records scene and the indie pop genre which followed.

== Career ==
=== Early days ===
The core of the band was singer-songwriter, Vic Godard, plus assorted soul fans, who congregated around early gigs by the Sex Pistols until Malcolm McLaren suggested they form their own band. Subway Sect were among the performers at the 100 Club Punk Festival on Monday, 21 September 1976 – sharing the bill with Siouxsie and the Banshees, The Clash and the Sex Pistols. The first line-up of Godard on vocals, Paul Packham on drums, Paul Myers on bass and Rob Symmons on guitar lasted for four gigs before Mark Laff replaced Packham. Laff himself then left for fellow punk group Generation X after the White Riot tour. A third drummer, Bob Ward, was recruited, and it is this line-up that can be heard on the band's first John Peel session and also on the single "Nobody's Scared". This was the first and only release on Braik Records, a label owned by Bernie Rhodes, who managed both Subway Sect and The Clash. Rhodes subsequently supervised the recording of their debut album at Gooseberry Studios in London, with Clash sound man and producer Mickey Foote at the production helm. At that time the band toured extensively with The Clash and others.

Number One for me at the moment are the Subway Sect. They've got some good ideas. The Slits are good, too. Palmolive on drums! She's the female Jerry Nolan. But like everyone, they need to do thirty gigs in thirty days and they would be a different group. Then they'd be great. The same with us.

— Joe Strummer

However, just as their first album was ready for release, for reasons that remain obscure, Rhodes sacked all the band (except Godard) and Subway Sect mark 1 ceased to exist. The album was never released, although a single from the sessions "Ambition" was remixed and released on Rough Trade Records, with the B-side "Different Story (Rock and Roll Even)" also taken from the same sessions. "Ambition" was ranked at No. 15 among the top "Tracks of the Year" for 1978 by NME. A further track "Parallel Lines" was released as a track on the C81 cassette produced by NME magazine. Since then, some monitor copies of tracks from the lost album have come to light on various Subway Sect compilations, including a Motion Records' 20 Odd Years double album anthology, and a CD and CD/EP set We Oppose All Rock And Roll on Overground Records. Any copies of the actual album tapes appear to no longer exist.

As a result of 1977 appearances at The Roxy club in London, live recordings were made of Subway Sect performances by Don Letts, the club's disc jockey. Subway Sect appears in Letts' Punk Rock Movie (1978).

=== Middle years ===
Godard reformed the band and as 'Vic Godard and Subway Sect' finally released their debut album What's the Matter, Boy? in 1980, following a period of shifting group personnel. The album features many songs written during the previous incarnation of the band, but performed with radically altered arrangements.

By this time, Godard had become increasingly influenced by early rockabilly, and the "first wave" of rock and roll (Sun Records session era Elvis Presley, Eddie Cochran etc.). This was just before the rockabilly revival, and the album was ignored as being 'retro'. Ignoring this, Godard then went further back in time, teaming up with guitarist Rob Marche, keyboardist Dave Collard, bassist Chris Bostock and drummer Sean McLusky with subsequent releases (inc. Songs for Sale – credited to Vic Godard and The Subway Sect), showing the influence of the "rat pack" (Dean Martin, Frank Sinatra), and 1940s swing, many years before these sounds became fashionable again. Faced by dwindling sales and following a solo album (T.R.O.U.B.L.E.) backed by Working Week, Godard left the music business and became a postman.

In 1982, former Subway Sect members – Rob Marche, Dave Collard, Chris Bostock and Sean McLusky – teamed up with American singer Dig Wayne and formed the band Jo Boxers.

=== Revival ===
In the 1990s a slow Godard revival began. Backed by the re-release of his work on CD and numerous compilation albums, Godard returned to recording, initially under his own name. In 2002, a CD was issued credited purely to Subway Sect, thus reviving the name, if not the original band. Named Sansend, it was a sample and beats heavy collection of new songs, and it was followed three years later by Motion's Singles Anthology, which collected single A and B sides.

Original Subway Sect guitarist and bass player, Rob Symmons and Paul Myers resurfaced as The Fallen Leaves in 2004, although Myers has since quit the band. Rob Symmons still performs and records with the band.

In 2007, a new Subway Sect (featuring on some recordings original members Mark Laff and Paul Myers, as well as former Sex Pistols drummer Paul Cook) released 1978 Now, a re-make of the original 1978 album as, Godard indicated, it had originally sounded. In 2011, Myers rejoined Vic Godard and Subway Sect permanently; his first official gig back was at Nambucca in London on 28 October 2011. Further vintage material was recorded in 2012 – again with Paul Cook on drums – and released in 2014 as 1979 Now.

As of 2019, the current Subway Sect line-up of Godard and Johnny Britton with a returned Chris Bostock and Sean McLusky has a new album Moments Like These due for release in 2020, produced by Mick Jones and previewed by single "How High The Walls" out on 25 December that year.

== Selected discography ==
=== Albums ===
- What's the Matter Boy? (1980), Oddball/MCA (as Vic Godard and Subway Sect)
- Songs For Sale (1982), London
- The End of the Surrey People (1993), Postcard
- Sansend (2002), Motion
- 1978 Now (2007), Overground
- Long Term side Effect (2009) Rough Trade
- We Come As Aliens (2010), Overground
- 1979 Now (2014), AED
- Moments Like These (2020), GNU

=== Compilations ===
- A Retrospective (1977–1981) (1984), Rough Trade (as Vic Godard and the Subway Sect)
- We Oppose All Rock 'n' Roll (1976–1980) (1996), Overground
- Twenty Odd Years – The Story Of (1999), Motion (as Vic Godard and the Subway Sect)
- Singles Anthology (2005), Motion (as Vic Godard and Subway Sect)
- Live and Rare, Vol 1 (2011), Gnu Inc
- 30 Odd Years (2014), Gnu Inc

=== Singles ===
- "Nobody's Scared" b/w "Don't Split It" (1978), Braik
- "Ambition" b/w "A Different Story" (1978), Rough Trade
- "Split Up the Money" b/w "Out of Touch" (1980), Oddball/MCA (as Vic Godard and Subway Sect)
- "Stamp of a Vamp" (1981), Club Left (as Vic Godard and The Subway Sect)
- "Hey Now (I'm in Love)" b/w "Just in Time", "Mr Bennett" (1981), London (as Vic Godard and The Subway Sect)
- "Ambition EP" (1996), Overground
- "Caught In Midstream" b/w "You Bring Out The Demon In Me" (2013) UK Physical Singles #57
- "Find Out All The Time" b/w "Dead Dreamy" (2016), GNU
- "How High The Walls" (2019), GNU

== See also ==
- "Is Vic There?"
- List of punk bands from the United Kingdom
- List of Peel Sessions
- List of 1970s punk rock musicians
