= JoBoxers =

British new wave group formed in 1982

- Origin: London, England
- Genres: New wave; progressive soul
- Years active: 1982–1985, 2020–present
- Labels: RCA, Sanctuary, Sony BMG
- Members: Rob Marche; Dave Collard; Chris Bostock; Sean McLusky; Dig Wayne
- Website: Joboxers.net

JoBoxers are a British new wave band formed in London, England in 1982 when former Subway Sect members Rob Marche (guitarist), Dave Collard (keyboardist), Chris Bostock (bassist), and Sean McLusky (drummer) teamed up with England-based American singer Dig Wayne (born Timothy Wayne Ball, 20 July 1958, Cambridge, Ohio). Wayne, under the name Buzz Wayne, had previously fronted the New York–based rockabilly band Buzz and the Flyers.

== Career ==
The band's debut single, "Boxerbeat", peaked at number three on the UK Singles Chart while the group were the opening act on the Madness Rise and Fall tour. At numbers one and two at the time were David Bowie's "Let's Dance" and Duran Duran's "Is There Something I Should Know?", respectively.

However, it was their next hit, "Just Got Lucky", that broke the band internationally. This single sold over 250,000 copies, made the UK top 10, and cracked the US top 40, reaching number 36 during November 1983. The song has been featured in a number of films including Just My Luck and The 40-Year-Old Virgin.

The third UK hit, "Johnny Friendly", is a homage to the Marlon Brando film On the Waterfront. British boxer Frank Bruno appeared in the promotional video for the song.

"Jealous Love"/"She's Got Sex" was released as a double A-side. "Jealous Love" was performed on the UK TV show Loose Talk introduced by the actress Diana Dors in one of her last TV appearances, while "She's Got Sex" was covered on Samantha Fox's double platinum-selling album Touch Me (as "He's Got Sex").

JoBoxers' debut album, Like Gangbusters, featuring all of the abovementioned hits, reached the top 20 of the UK Albums Chart.

The band released another single, "Is This Really the First Time", and a second album Skin and Bone in 1985, but then split up during the making of a third album, with Sean McLusky joining Rob Marche in the indie-dance band called If? and Chris Bostock joining David A. Stewart to form his post-Eurythmics group the Spiritual Cowboys, achieving two gold albums in France.

Meanwhile, Dig Wayne remained in London and briefly attempted a solo career, releasing the album Square Business in 1987, featuring fellow former JoBoxer Dave Collard on keyboards. One single, "Mastermind" was released from this album. After his solo efforts proved unsuccessful, Wayne began pursuing an acting career. He appeared in several stage productions (including a starring role in the successful West End musical Five Guys Named Moe) in the UK. In 1995, he returned to the US, settling in Los Angeles, California, to continue pursuing his acting/television career.

In November 2020, they announced a reunion show at London's 100 Club, after 35 years of inactivity. Other dates in Brighton, Leeds, Guildford and Bristol were also added, plus some festivals. The dates went ahead in summer 2022.

In 2025, the JoBoxers box set Just Got Lucky - The Complete Works 1983-1986 was released on Cherry Red Records and including all recorded works, released and unreleased, plus Live at the Phoenix Theatre.

In June 2025, new single "A Thorn in My Side" reached No. 11 on the Heritage Chart.

== Later activities ==
Chris Bostock performed bass on the Style Council's debut album Cafe Bleu, Dave Stewart and the Spiritual Cowboys albums, the self-titled Dave Stewart and the Spiritual Cowboys and Honest with extensive touring, Spear of Destiny's The Price You Pay album and tour, Sandie Shaw tours with Sean McLusky and Rob Marche, the Shakespears Sister single and album track "Goodbye Cruel World" and produced albums for EMI and BMG. Bostock currently records and tours as a member of Subway Sect.

Rob Marche went on to form Earl Brutus in 1993.

In 2012, JoBoxers' debut album Like Gangbusters was re-released.

Wayne returned to his music roots and fronted the band Dig Wayne and the Chisellers. Also a guitarist and drummer, Wayne has toured both America and Europe with his band. Wayne also appeared in the sixth episode of season 8 of CSI, "Who and What", playing a pawn shop owner.

Dave Collard joined the The and performed on Mind Bomb (1989) and Dusk (1993) as well as in 'The The Versus the World' world tour. Following Matt Johnson's decision to re-form the band and tour in 2019, Dave (or "DC") Collard toured globally with the The, opening three nights in London (the Royal Albert Hall, Brixton Academy and then Troxy) and finishing the world tour in Australia, playing two nights in the main auditorium at the Sydney Opera House followed immediately by another two nights at the Arts Centre Melbourne. Under the name DC Collard, he continues to write and record.

== Discography ==
=== Albums ===
Year	Album	Label	Peak chart positions		
Year	Album	Label	UK	US	NZ
1983	Like Gangbusters (re-released in 2012)	RCA	18	70	37
1985	Skin and Bone (unreleased)	RCA	—	—	—
1986	Missing Link (unreleased)	N/A	—	—	—
"—" denotes releases that did not chart.

=== Compilation albums ===
- Doing the Boxerbeat – The Anthology (Sanctuary, 2003)
- Essential Boxerbeat (Sony BMG, 2006, Cooking Vinyl, 2022) (originally released in 1996)
- Just Got Lucky - The Complete Works 1983-1986 (Cherry Red Records, 2025)

=== Singles ===
Year	Single	Peak chart positions					
Year	Single	AUS	GER	IRE	NZ	UK	US
1983	"Boxerbeat"	—	23	4	—	3	—
1983	"Just Got Lucky"	25	54	13	50	7	36
1983	"Johnny Friendly"	—	—	—	—	31	—
1983	"Jealous Love" / "She's Got Sex"	—	—	—	— 50	72	—
1985	"Is This Really the First Time"	—	—	—	—	—	—
"—" denotes releases that did not chart or were not released

== Song uses ==
- "Just Got Lucky" was featured in the films Bagets, The 40-Year-Old Virgin starring Steve Carell, and Just My Luck starring Lindsay Lohan.
- "Boxerbeat" is the subject of a Stewart Lee stand-up comedy routine, "Dog and Kittens Postcard".
