= Booker Newberry III =

American singer and keyboardist (1956–2023)

- Born: January 19, 1956; Youngstown, Ohio, U.S.
- Died: April 5, 2023 (aged 67)
- Genres: Soul
- Occupation(s): Singer, keyboardist
- Instrument: Keyboard
- Years active: 1971–1996
- Labels: Casablanca, Boardwalk, Malaco, Omni Records

Booker Newberry III (January 19, 1956 – April 5, 2023) was an American singer and keyboardist, who was a member of the mid-1970s soul groups Sweet Thunder ("Baby I Need Your Love Today"), and Impact, before pursuing a solo career. He is probably best remembered for his 1983 hit "Love Town".

== Life and career ==
Newberry was born in Youngstown, Ohio, on January 19, 1956. He began his professional singing career in the group Mystic Nights around 1971. Moving to Philadelphia he became the lead singer of Sweet Thunder, which also included drummer John Aaron, bassist Rudell Alexander, and guitarist Charles Buie. Signing with the Philly-based record label WMOT Records, the group's single, "Baby I Need Your Love Today" b/w "I Don't Care What You Say", stirred interest and was picked up for distribution by Berkeley, California based Fantasy Records.

The group recorded three albums, Above the Clouds (1976), Sweet Thunder (1978), and Horizons (1979), the latter of which saw the single "I Leave You Stronger," go to #63 Billboard R&B chart in late 1979. Newberry joined another WMOT Records group, Impact, who was best known for the dance hits "Give a Broken Heart a Break" and "Rainy Days Stormy Nights".

Newberry signed with Neil Bogart's Casablanca Records in 1983, and his solo single "Love Town" originally released on the Boardwalk label, was a Top 10 UK hit. The Love Town album was issued the same year. He has also recorded for Malaco Records and Omni Records. In 1986 he released the single "Take a Piece of Me".

In 1991 he released "Bad Luck", his last single to date. He later recorded his second studio album entitled Power People in 1996. In 2005 Unidisc Music released the Love Town compilation album. It contained many previously unreleased songs recorded by Newberry in the 1980s.

Newberry died on April 5, 2023, at the age of 67.

== Discography ==
=== Albums ===
- Love Town (1983)
- Power People (1996)

=== Singles ===
Year	Single	Peak chart positions		
Year	Single	US Dance	US R&B	UK
1982	"I Get Romantic"	—	—	—
1983	"Love Town"	66	46	6
1983	"Teddy Bear"	—	—	44
1983	"Boom Boom"	—	—	—
1984	"Shadows"	—	—	—
1986	"Take a Piece of Me"	—	61	—
1991	"Bad Luck"	—	—	—
"—" denotes releases that did not chart.

=== Compilations ===
- Love Town (2005)
