= They Don't Know (Kirsty MacColl song) =

1979 single by Kirsty MacColl

Single by Kirsty MacColl
- B-side: "Motor On"
- Released: 1 June 1979
- Recorded: Early 1979
- Genre: Power pop; jangle pop
- Label: Stiff
- Songwriter: Kirsty MacColl
- Producer: Liam Sternberg

Kirsty MacColl singles chronology
"They Don't Know" (1979)	"Keep Your Hands off My Baby" (1981)

"They Don't Know" is a song composed and first recorded in 1979 by Kirsty MacColl. It was released as a single by Stiff Records on 1 June 1979. Though unsuccessful, the song was later recorded by Tracey Ullman in 1983. Ullman's version reached No. 2 in the UK and No. 8 in the US.

== Original version ==
=== Composition and release ===
When I was with the R&B outfit Drug Addix, Stiff Records paid for some demos to be done with the band, but they didn't really like them. When they heard that I'd eventually left [Drug Addix] they called me & said: "We'd like you to come & play us anything you’ve got." I said: "I thought you didn't like the demos", and they said: "We hate the band, but we quite like you". When they asked if I had any songs, I said: "Oh yeah, loads!", even though I didn't at all. Then I thought: "Oh God, I'd better write something before I go in to see them." And that's when I wrote "They Don't Know". I went round with a cassette, singing to an acoustic guitar. They liked it and signed me.

— Kirsty MacColl on the genesis of "They Don't Know"

Recorded in Stiff Records' mobile studio, The China Shop, in the early 1979, Kirsty MacColl's original recording of "They Don't Know" "emphasized layered harmonies in which MacColl turns her own voice into a chorus of over-dubbed parts" – an evocation of a long-standing admiration for the Beach Boys engendered at age 7 by hearing her brother's copy of the "Good Vibrations" single:

I played it so much he just said: "have it" ... I played it incessantly for about twelve hours a day, working out all the different parts and harmonies.

Besides the regular vinyl single release of 1 June 1979 a picture disc edition was issued 6 July 1979. The B-side to "They Don't Know" was MacColl's recording of her composition "Turn My Motor On" – some copies read "Motor On" – a setlist staple of Drug Addix, the band MacColl had recently left (consideration had been given to making "Turn My Motor On" the A-side). MacColl's "They Don't Know" reached number two on the Music Week airplay chart without generating sufficient sales to reach the UK Singles Chart – a shortfall blamed on a strike at the distributors for Stiff Records keeping the single out of stores, although its producer Liam Sternberg attributes the failure of "They Don't Know" to ill feeling which developed between MacColl and Stiff Records president Dave Robinson:

Kirsty and Dave didn’t get along ... She didn’t want to sign a longer deal, so Dave didn’t promote the record. [Despite] airplay ... they didn’t press any more [so] no records [were] sold because there were no records out there.

Promo copies of a followup single: "You Caught Me Out", were pressed in October 1979 but Stiff opted to shelve the single, with MacColl's first release subsequent to "They Don't Know" being her remake of "Keep Your Hands Off My Baby" released in 1981 on Polydor.

MacColl's version of "They Don't Know" would not make its album debut until 1995 on the singer's retrospective album Galore.

=== Critical reception ===
Upon its release, Cliff White, writing for Smash Hits, praised the single as an "impressive, self-composed debut by the 19 year-old daughter of folk singer Ewan MacColl". He called "They Don't Know" a "neat, '60s-style, beat-ballad" that he believed was "reminiscent" of Lesley Gore's 1963 hit "It's My Party", and the "better" B-side, "Turn My Motor On", a "raunchy, rudely rocking, Blondie-ish track". David Hepworth of Sounds said that the song was producer Liam Sternberg's "stab at Twinkle territory, all thwarted puppy love and unfeeling adults, courtesy of MacColl". He noted how the "arrangement and melancholic, swirling production are the work of a man in love with the idea of pure pop, if not necessarily its substance", and commented on how MacColl "sings in a manner that moves from a child-like stiltedness to a more adult facility and hits some kind of zenith with a solo interjection of 'baby!' dragged over five syllables".

Nick Kehoe of the Telegraph & Argus described it as a "pleasant Sixties-style singalong number" and Lenny Juviski of the Northern Echo noted how "clever double-tracking lifts this slow-burning Sixties-ish teen-love drama". Adrian Thrills of the NME wrote that MacColl "seems a well-voiced singer" who "could easily stand on the merits of her own talent alone", but felt it was a "shame about the song and Liam Sternberg's unsympathetic, gushing production". Rosalind Russell of Record Mirror was critical, remarking that MacColl "sounds like Twinkle with the Silvikrin hairspray in her throat instead of gluing her head on".

=== Track listing ===
1. "They Don't Know" (MacColl)
2. "[Turn My] Motor On" (MacColl)

=== Charts ===
Chart (1979)	Peak position
UK The Singles Chart (Record Business)	62
UK Airplay Guide (Record Business)	14

== Tracey Ullman version ==
"They Don't Know"

Single by Tracey Ullman

from the album You Broke My Heart in 17 Places
- B-side: "The B-Side"
- Released: 16 September 1983
- Genre: Pop; new wave
- Length: 3:00
- Label: MCA; Stiff
- Songwriter: Kirsty MacColl
- Producer: Peter Collins

Tracey Ullman singles chronology
"Breakaway" (1983)	"They Don't Know" (1983)	"Move Over Darling" (1983)

Audio sample
- "They Don't Know": file; help

Music video
- Video on YouTube

I wish I'd got to #1—but "Karma Chameleon" hung on ... When Kid Jensen announced I still hadn't made #1, I was really pissed off. I mean, I wore that pink lurex miniskirt for weeks, with all the dry ice on flipping Top of the Pops, & I still didn't make it. It still hurts.

— Tracey Ullman in 2016 on the number-two UK chart peak of "They Don't Know"

In October 1983, Tracey Ullman reached number two on the UK Singles Chart with her recording of "They Don't Know" for Stiff Records; the track was included on Ullman's debut album You Broke My Heart in 17 Places. "They Don't Know" was ranked at number 23 on the year-end tally of UK chart singles and afforded Ullman a number-one hit in Ireland for two weeks, and it spent nine weeks at number one in Norway.

Well known in the UK as an actress/comedienne, Ullman had had a top-10 hit with her debut single "Breakaway". Pete Waterman, whose Loose End Productions had recently provided Stiff hit singles with the Belle Stars, suggested to his friend Kirsty MacColl that she pitch her composition "They Don't Know" for Ullman to record as her second single.

The production of Ullman's "They Don't Know" was credited to Peter Collins, Waterman's Loose Ends partner. Waterman honed the track, including having MacColl and Rosemary Robinson (the wife of Stiff Records president Dave Robinson) "add Shangri-La-type backing vocals", in Waterman's words, and having MacColl reprise her original "bay-bee” to intro the third verse (as Ullman had a limited high-end range).

MTV cofounder Robert Pittman saw the video made to promote Ullman's "They Don't Know", and despite Ullman having nil exposure in the US, Pittman invited her to be a guest MTV VJ for the week of 13–18 February 1984. The resultant positive response caused MCA Records to rush-release "They Don't Know" as Ullman's debut US single, which eventually reached number eight on the Billboard Hot 100 and number 11 on the Adult Contemporary.

"They Don't Know" was Ullman's only Top 40 hit in the US. Although she had three more entries in the UK Top 30 – including the top-10 hit "Move Over Darling" – Ullman, when asked in a 2017 Guardian interview "If you could edit your past, what would you change?", said: "I would have stopped making records after 'They Don’t Know'."

In 1997, "They Don't Know" became the theme song for the final three seasons of Ullman's HBO television series Tracey Takes On.... The Ullman version was used as the theme for the opening credits of Our Nixon, a 2013 documentary about US President Richard Nixon.

Ullman sang the song in 2002 at a memorial tribute concert for MacColl, who was killed in a boating accident in December 2000. It was Ullman's first public singing performance in nearly 20 years.

=== Comparison with Kirsty MacColl's original version ===
In September 2021, Tracey Ullman confirmed on the BBC's Desert Island Discs radio programme that her version of "They Don't Know" contains the high note on the word "Baby" from Kirsty MacColl's original version.

Comparing the two versions, Ken Tucker of The Philadelphia Inquirer wrote "Ullman's rendition ... makes [the song] palatable to American audiences by [replacing] McColl's fervent intensity with a bouncy cheerfulness & layers of ... synthesizers ... It's a cheerful throwback to the innocent hits of 1960s girl-group rock".

=== Video ===
A video was filmed to promote Ullman's version of "They Don't Know" in which Paul McCartney made a cameo (McCartney had just completed filming Give My Regards to Broad Street in which Ullman had a cameo). Directed by Stiff Records president Dave Robinson, the video for "They Don't Know" had a storyline devised by Ullman herself in which she played a young woman in a blossoming romantic relationship with her working class, ne'er-do-well boyfriend in the 1960s. The video concludes with Ullman portraying the song's protagonist as a dowdy council estate (public housing) type mother (not unlike her character Betty Tomlinson from the comedy sketch show Three of a Kind), unkempt, heavily pregnant and shopping for groceries in her slippers, her life of domestic drudgery sustained only by her fantasy of being in a relationship with her idol Paul McCartney.

The comical video was voted the second best video of 1983 by readers of Smash Hits magazine (beaten only by Duran Duran's "Union of the Snake" video), Ullman was voted Best Female Singer, and the song was voted fourth Best Single of 1983.

=== Charts ===
Weekly charts
Chart (1983–1984)	Peak position
Australia (Kent Music Report)	56
Belgium (Ultratop 50 Flanders)	6
Canada Top Singles (RPM)	5
Canada Adult Contemporary (RPM)	9
Finland (Suomen virallinen lista)	19
Ireland (IRMA)	1
Netherlands (Dutch Top 40)	8
Netherlands (Single Top 100)	10
New Zealand (Recorded Music NZ)	15
Norway (VG-lista)	1
UK Singles (Official Charts)	2
US Billboard Hot 100	8
West Germany (GfK)	35

Year-end 1983
Chart	Position
Belgium (Ultratop)	97
Netherlands (Dutch Top 40)	75
UK Singles (OCC)	23

Year-end 1984
Chart	Position
US Billboard Hot 100	71

=== Certifications ===
Region	Certification	Certified units/sales
United Kingdom (BPI)	Silver	250,000^{^}
^{^} Shipments figures based on certification alone.

== Other cover versions ==
- In 2006, Katrina Leskanich recorded an acoustic version of the song for her self-titled album. Leskanich said, "I kept saying to [her mid-1980s bandmates in Katrina & the Waves]: 'Let's do a [stripped-down] version of "They Don't Know" ... There's another song in there that Tracey Ullman and [even its writer] Kirsty MacColl ... didn't touch. It could be really, really tender.' When the Waves split up, I thought: 'Good, now I can do it!'" In 2008, a dance-pop remix of the Katrina's remake was released promotionally, produced by Sleaze Sisters using a newly re-recorded vocal session.
- In 2013, Matthew Sweet and Susanna Hoffs covered the song for their album Under the Covers, Vol. 3.
- In 2014, country singer Lydia Loveless recorded a version for her album Somewhere Else released by Bloodshot Records.
