= Love Town =

Single by Booker Newberry III

from the album Love Town
- B-side: "Doin' What Comes Naturally"
- Released: April 1983
- Recorded: 1982
- Genre: Soul
- Length: 5:18 (Long Version)
- Label: The Boardwalk Entertainment Co (US)
- Songwriter(s): Len Barry, Bobby Eli
- Producer(s): Eli & Park Place Productions

Booker Newberry III singles chronology
"Love Town" (1983)	"Teddy Bear" (1983)

"Love Town" is a solo single co-written by Len Barry and Bobby Eli and released by the former Sweet Thunder and Impact member, Booker Newberry III in 1983. It was taken from the same-titled album released later that year.

While the single and album had limited success in his home country of the U.S., Newberry's single was popular enough across the Atlantic to reach #6 on the UK Singles Chart, his only significant chart hit in either country. It remained his signature song.

== Chart performance ==
Chart (1983)	Peak position
UK Singles Chart	6
US Billboard Dance	66
US Billboard R&B	46
