= Nan Vernon =

Canadian singer

- Genres: Alternative rock
- Occupation: Singer
- Instruments: Vocals; guitar
- Years active: 1987–present
- Labels: Eastwest
- Formerly of: Dave Stewart and The Spiritual Cowboys

Nan Vernon is a Canadian singer. She is notable for providing the end credit music of both of Rob Zombie's Halloween films and for being part of the "singer-songwriter trend" of women nurturing folk music's rebirth.

== Biography ==
=== Early life ===
Vernon is the daughter of Nancy West and actor John Vernon, and the sister of actress Kate Vernon. She was raised in Toronto, Ontario, Canada until age 8, when she moved with her family to Los Angeles, California.

In the late 1980s she recorded and toured with Andy Summers appearing on the XYZ album.

=== Early career ===
The Eurythmics' Dave Stewart discovered Vernon. As she explains, "the story we used to tell was that I found Dave and Bob Dylan drunk and lost at a train station in Tijuana and that I gave them a ride home, but that wasn't how I met him. It was a call out of the blue from Wardrobe Stylist, Genny Schorr, who suggested that I might be someone Dave would like as a member of his band. Dave is the kind of person who encourages people." She joined Dave Stewart & The Spiritual Cowboys as Izzy Mae Doorite and contributed backing vocals and rhythm guitar parts on the band's two albums and on tour. Vernon parlayed "her high-profile acquaintance with Stewart into a record deal and released Manta Ray in 1994, through Stewart's Anxious Records."

=== Recordings and reception ===
Tom Demalon praises her debut album, lauding the singer for "her keen sense of melody, articulate writing, and pristine vocals" that "make it more memorable than many other such releases. 'Motorcycle' kicks things off with a percolating road tale driven by grinding guitar, but most of the material is of a more introspective nature such as the dreamy 'Tattoo Tears,' 'No More Lullabies,' and the gorgeous afterlife ballad 'The Big Picture,' all delivered in a breathy fashion....Manta Ray is a better than average debut." John Koenig similarly describes her CD Manta Ray as "a collection of songs brimming with creative music and imagery." Koenig goes on to write that her "exquisite live reworkings of songs from the '60's, like John Lennon's "Nowhere Man" and Jim Morrison's "Crystal Ship" give insight into her appreciation for rock music's classic poet/lyricists."

Vernon has provided covers of songs for the reboot of the Halloween series of horror films. A new version of the song, "Mr. Sandman", recorded by Nan Vernon, is featured in Rob Zombie's Halloween. She also performs "Love Hurts" for the film's sequel.

=== Influences ===
In an interview, Vernon said, "I really like theatrical music, like Brecht and that era. I love Eastern European music, the music of the Twenties and Thirties, Cole Porter. I love Elvis Presley. I love lyrical storytelling....I love Tom Waits and Billie Holiday. Velvet Underground. Of the newer bands, I like Belly and Bettie Serveert. I guess my favourite songwriters are John Lennon, Leonard Cohen, Tom Waits".

== Solo discography ==
- "My Love" (1990)
- "No More Lullabyes" (1992)
- "While My Guitar Gently Weeps" (1993)
- "Motorcycle" (1994)
- Manta Ray (1994)
- "Elvis Waits" (1994)

== Compilation and soundtrack appearances ==
- "Moon River" on Shots in the Dark (1996)
- "A New Shade of Blue" on Delphonic Sounds Today! (1999)
- "The Hangman's Song" on Dawn of the Dead score (2004) – with Tyler Bates, Joey Waronker, Rusty Logsdon and Soda
- "Tiger and Dragon" on Re-enter the Dragon: A Black Belt Graffiti of the Grandmaster Dragon by His Li'l Dragons of Sound and Vision (2004)
- "We'll Come Back for You" in The Devil's Rejects (2005)
- "Mr. Sandman" on Rob Zombie's Halloween soundtrack (2007)
- "Somebody Loves You" on Lumberjack Shirts Night: Dedicated to Mala Noche (2007) – by Floy Mae, her latest band
- "Winter in Parodis" in Werewolf Women of the SS (2007)
- "(undetermined song) in The Day the Earth Stood Still (2008)
- "Love Hurts" on Rob Zombie's Halloween II soundtrack (2009) and on some advertisements for the Australian horror film The Loved Ones (2009)
