= Boxerbeat =

Single by JoBoxers

from the album Like Gangbusters
- A-side: "Boxerbeat"
- B-side: "Let's Talk About Love"
- Released: 1983
- Genre: New wave
- Label: RCA Victor
- Songwriter(s): David Collard/Dig Wayne (both); Rob Marche ("Boxerbeat"); Sean McLusky ("Let's Talk About Love")

JoBoxers singles chronology
"Boxerbeat" (1983)	"Just Got Lucky" (1983)

"Boxerbeat" is the debut single by JoBoxers from their album Like Gangbusters. It peaked at number three on the UK Singles Chart in 1983.
