= Loose Talk (British TV series) =

1983 British television series

Loose Talk is a British chat show that ran for two series on Channel 4 in 1983. It was presented by Steve Taylor, along with a different guest presenter each week. It featured bands including Grace Jones, Robert Wyatt, Squeeze, Jools Holland, Tenpole Tudor, the Cocteau Twins on 11 October 1983 and the first TV appearance for Sade. The news section was written by Marek Kohn who was a features writer for The Face. The producers Madeleine French and Don Coutts also produced the 1970s Community Programmes series 'Something Else'.

It was notable for giving Ian Hislop his first break in television. Jonathan Ross worked as a researcher for the show.
