= Move Over Darling (song) =

Single by Doris Day
- B-side: "Twinkle Lullaby"
- Released: 1963
- Genre: Pop
- Length: 2:35
- Label: CBS
- Songwriters: Terry Melcher, Hal Kanter & Joe Lubin
- Producers: Terry Melcher; Arranged and Conducted by Jack Nitzsche

"Move Over Darling" is a song originally recorded by Doris Day, which was the theme from the 1963 movie Move Over, Darling, starring Doris Day, James Garner and Polly Bergen, and was released as a single the same year. The song was written by Doris Day's son, Terry Melcher, along with Hal Kanter and Joe Lubin.

In 1964, Doris Day's version of the song spent 16 weeks on the United Kingdom's Record Retailer chart, peaking at No. 8, while reaching No. 1 in Hong Kong, and No. 4 on New Zealand's "Lever Hit Parade". In 1987, the song was re-released as a single and it re-charted on the UK Singles Chart, reaching No. 45.

In 1983, Tracey Ullman released a version of the song as a single and on the album You Broke My Heart in 17 Places. Ullman's version spent 9 weeks on the UK Singles Chart, peaking at No. 8, while reaching No. 5 on the Irish Singles Chart, No. 15 in Flanders No. 13 on the Dutch Top 40, and No. 20 on the Dutch Nationale Hitparade.
