= Edwyn Collins discography =

- Studio albums: 10
- EPs: 4
- Soundtrack albums: 2
- Live albums: 2
- Compilation albums: 5
- Singles: 29
- Video albums: 1

This is the solo discography of Scottish musician Edwyn Collins. For his work with Orange Juice, see Orange Juice discography.

== Albums ==
=== Studio albums ===
Title	Album details	Peak chart positions									
Title	Album details	SCO	UK	UK Indie	AUS	AUT	CAN	GER	NL	SWE	US
Hope and Despair	Released: 29 May 1989; Label: Demon; Formats: CD, LP, MC	—	—	4	—	—	—	—	—	—	—
Hellbent on Compromise	Released: October 1990; Label: Demon; Formats: CD, LP, MC	—	—	—	—	—	—	—	—	—	—
Gorgeous George	Released: 5 September 1994; Label: Setanta; Formats: CD, LP, MC	18	8	2	37	24	60	7	58	16	183
I'm Not Following You	Released: 1 September 1997; Label: Setanta; Formats: CD, LP, MC	55	55	12	—	—	—	—	—	—	—
Doctor Syntax	Released: 29 April 2002; Label: Setanta; Formats: CD	—	—	40	—	—	—	—	—	—	—
Home Again	Released: 17 September 2007; Label: Heavenly; Formats: CD, LP	39	90	—	—	—	—	—	—	—	—
Losing Sleep	Released: 20 September 2010; Label: Heavenly; Formats: CD, 2x12", digital download	34	54	—	—	—	—	—	—	—	—
Understated	Released: 25 March 2013; Label: AED; Formats: CD, LP, digital download	37	66	14	—	—	—	—	—	—	—
Badbea	Released: 29 March 2019; Label: AED; Formats: CD, LP, digital download	19	—	13	—	—	—	—	—	—	—
Nation Shall Speak Unto Nation	Released: 14 March 2025; Label: AED; Formats: CD, LP, digital download	8	—	7	—	—	—	—	—	—	—
"—" denotes releases that did not chart or were not released in that territory.

=== Live albums ===
Title	Album details
Studio Live Session Liechtenstein	Released: 19 May 2014; Label: Society of Sound Music/Real World; Formats: digital download
Live at Bloomsbury Ballroom	Released: 30 November 2014; Label: AED; Formats: MC

=== Soundtrack albums ===
Title	Album details
The Possibilities Are Endless (with Carwyn Ellis and Sebastian Lewsley)	Released: 9 November 2014; Label: AED; Formats: CD, LP, digital download; Soundtrack to the Edwyn Collins documentary film of the same name
Sometimes Always Never (with Sean Read)	Released: 14 June 2019; Label: AED; Formats: LP, digital download; Soundtrack to the 2018 film of the same name

=== Compilation albums ===
Title	Album details
Hope and Despair / Hellbent on Compromise	Released: 1990; Label: Demon; Formats: 2xCD
Elevation Days	Released: 10 April 1995; Label: WEA; Formats: CD; Japan-only mini-album
A Casual Introduction 1981/2001	Released: 28 October 2002; Label: Setanta; Formats: CD; Compilation of Collins' solo work along with Orange Juice
Down the Line – 12 Songs from 1989–2011	Released: 11 December 2011; Label: AED; Formats: digital download
Tape Box	Released: 21 April 2012; Label: AED; Formats: 6x7" box set

=== Video albums ===
Title	Album details
Phantasmagoria – Reading Festival 1991	Released: 1991; Label: Alternative Image; Formats: VHS

== EPs ==
Title	Album details	Peak chart positions	
Title	Album details	SCO	UK
My Beloved Girl	Released: October 1987; Label: Elevation; Formats: 7"; Limited release	—	—
Expressly	Released: October 1994; Label: Setanta; Formats: CD, 12"	26	42
I Hear a New World	Released: November 1997; Label: Setanta; Formats: 2x12"	—	—
Daytrotter Session	Released: 20 June 2011; Label: Daytrotter; Formats: digital download	—	—
"—" denotes releases that did not chart.

== Singles ==
Title	Year	Peak chart positions										Album
Title	Year	SCO	UK	UK Indie	AUS	AUT	CAN	GER	NL	SWE	US	Album
"Pale Blue Eyes" (with Paul Quinn)	1984	—	72	—	—	—	—	—	—	—	—	Non-album singles
"Don't Shilly Shally"	1987	—	93	—	—	—	—	—	—	—	—	Non-album singles
"My Beloved Girl"	1987	—	84	—	—	—	—	—	—	—	—	Non-album singles
"Coffee Table Song"	1989	—	—	—	—	—	—	—	—	—	—	Hope and Despair
"50 Shades of Blue"	1989	—	—	—	—	—	—	—	—	—	—	Hope and Despair
"A Girl Like You"	1994	5	4	1	6	7	16	3	18	4	32	Gorgeous George
"Low Expectations" (Belgium-only release)	1995	—	—	—	—	—	—	—	—	—	—	Gorgeous George
"If You Could Love Me"	1995	85	98	12	—	—	—	87	—	—	—	Gorgeous George
"Make Me Feel Again"	1995	—	—	—	—	—	—	—	—	—	—	Gorgeous George
"Keep On Burning"	1996	36	45	8	—	—	—	—	—	—	—	I'm Not Following You
"The Magic Piper (Of Love)"	1997	20	32	6	—	—	—	—	—	—	—	I'm Not Following You
"Adidas World"	1997	63	71	14	—	—	—	—	—	—	—	I'm Not Following You
"No One Waved Goodbye"	1998	—	—	—	—	—	—	—	—	—	—	I'm Not Following You
"Message for Jojo" (with Bernard Butler)	2001	—	113	20	—	—	—	—	—	—	—	Doctor Syntax
"The Beatle$"	2001	—	—	—	—	—	—	—	—	—	—	Doctor Syntax
"Johnny Teardrop"	2002	—	192	—	—	—	—	—	—	—	—	Doctor Syntax
"Mr. Freedom" (Gabin featuring Edwyn Collins; Italy-only release)	2004	—	—	—	—	—	—	—	—	—	—	Mr. Freedom (by Gabin)
"You'll Never Know (My Love)"	2007	—	139	—	—	—	—	—	—	—	—	Home Again
"Home Again"	2008	—	—	—	—	—	—	—	—	—	—	Home Again
"Losing Sleep"	2010	—	—	—	—	—	—	—	—	—	—	Losing Sleep
"Do It Again"	2010	—	—	—	—	—	—	—	—	—	—	Losing Sleep
"In Your Eyes" (with the Drums)	2011	—	—	—	—	—	—	—	—	—	—	Losing Sleep
"What Are You Doing, Fool?" (with the Heartbreaks)	2013	—	—	—	—	—	—	—	—	—	—	Non-album single
"Dilemma"	2013	—	—	—	—	—	—	—	—	—	—	Understated
"Too Bad (That's Sad)"	2013	—	—	—	—	—	—	—	—	—	—	Understated
"Dilemma" (The Ship-Tones featuring Edwyn Collins)	2014	—	—	—	—	—	—	—	—	—	—	Indie Reggae Revolution (by the Ship-Tones)
"(Too Right) It's Christmas" (Frankie & the Heartstrings featuring Edwyn Collins)	2015	—	—	—	—	—	—	—	—	—	—	Non-album single
"Outside"	2019	—	—	—	—	—	—	—	—	—	—	Badbea
"It's All About You"/"Sometimes Always Never"	2019	—	—	—	—	—	—	—	—	—	—	Badbea
"—" denotes releases that did not chart or were not released in that territory.

== Contributions ==
Year	Album	Artist	Contribution
1985	Call and Response	Zeke Manyika	Guitar on "Lay Them Down"
1990	Stray	Aztec Camera	
1991	I Am the Greatest	A House	Backing vocals and production
1993	The End of the Surrey People	Vic Godard	Vocals, guitar, piano, organ, engineer, production
1994	Wide-Eyed and Ignorant	A House	Backing vocals, guitar, harmonica, keyboards, production
1996	More of Her	Four Hours Sleep	Vocals and lead guitar on "Don't You Ever Listen"
1996	Warm Nights	Robert Forster	
1998	People Move On	Bernard Butler	Backing vocals on "Not Alone"
1998	Long-Term Side Effect	Vic Godard	Backing vocals, guitar, bass, production
1998	Shaving Peaches	Terrorvision	Keyboards, production
1999	Strange Weather Lately	Astrid	Organ, production
2001	Playgroup	Playgroup	Vocals, guitar, organ
2002	Une guerre en plein cœur	Franck Roussel	Vocals on "Time"
2003	Born Innocent	The Proclaimers	Guitar, production
2005	We Are Little Barrie	Little Barrie	Backing vocals, keyboards, organ, guitar, bass, production
2005	The New Fellas	The Cribs	Backing vocals, keyboards, effects, production
2008	Cookie Zoo	Colorama	Percussion, production
2010	King of the Waves	Little Barrie	Backing vocals, keyboards, organ, bass, production
2011	Hunger	Frankie & the Heartstrings	Backing vocals, mixing, engineer, production
2011	Howl of the Lonely Crowd	Comet Gain	Backing vocals, executive production
2017	Permo	Spinning Coin	Synthesizer on "Running with the World", production
2018	Tracyanne & Danny	Tracyanne & Danny	Gest vocals on "Alabama", production
2022	Hollow Heart	The Hanging Stars	Guest vocals
