= Paul Cook =

British drummer (born 1956)

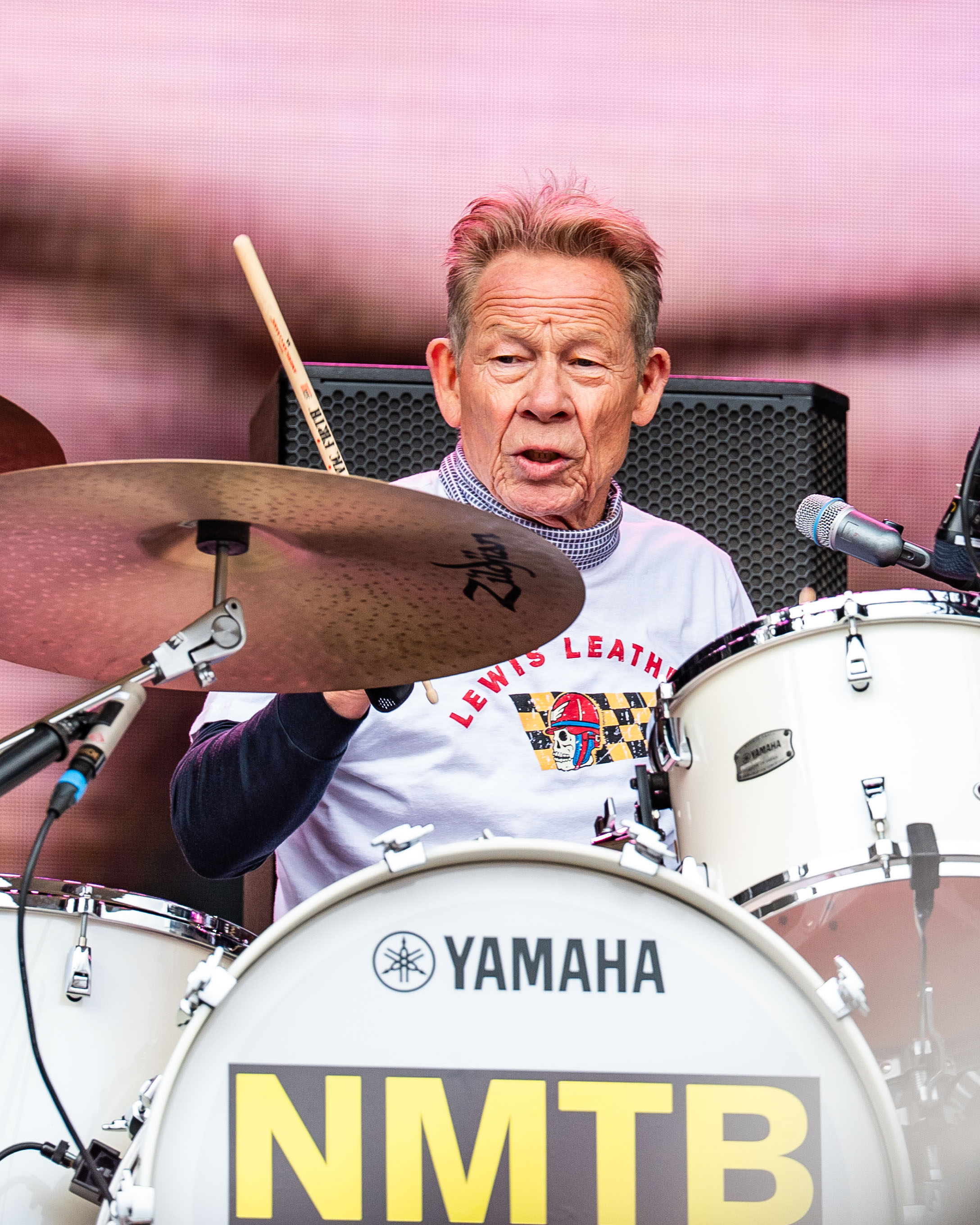
- Cook performing with Sex Pistols and Frank Carter in 2025

Background information
- Born: Paul Thomas Cook; 20 July 1956 (age 70); Shepherd's Bush, London, England
- Genre: Punk rock
- Occupation: Drummer
- Years active: 1975–present
- Member of: Sex Pistols; Generation Sex
- Formerly of: The Professionals; Chiefs of Relief; Vic Godard and Subway Sect; Man Raze
- Website: Official Sex Pistols web site; Official web site of Vic Godard & Subway Sect

Paul Thomas Cook (born 20 July 1956) is an English musician, best known as the drummer and a founding member of the punk rock band the Sex Pistols. He is nicknamed "Cookie" by friends in the punk music scene.

== Early life and career ==
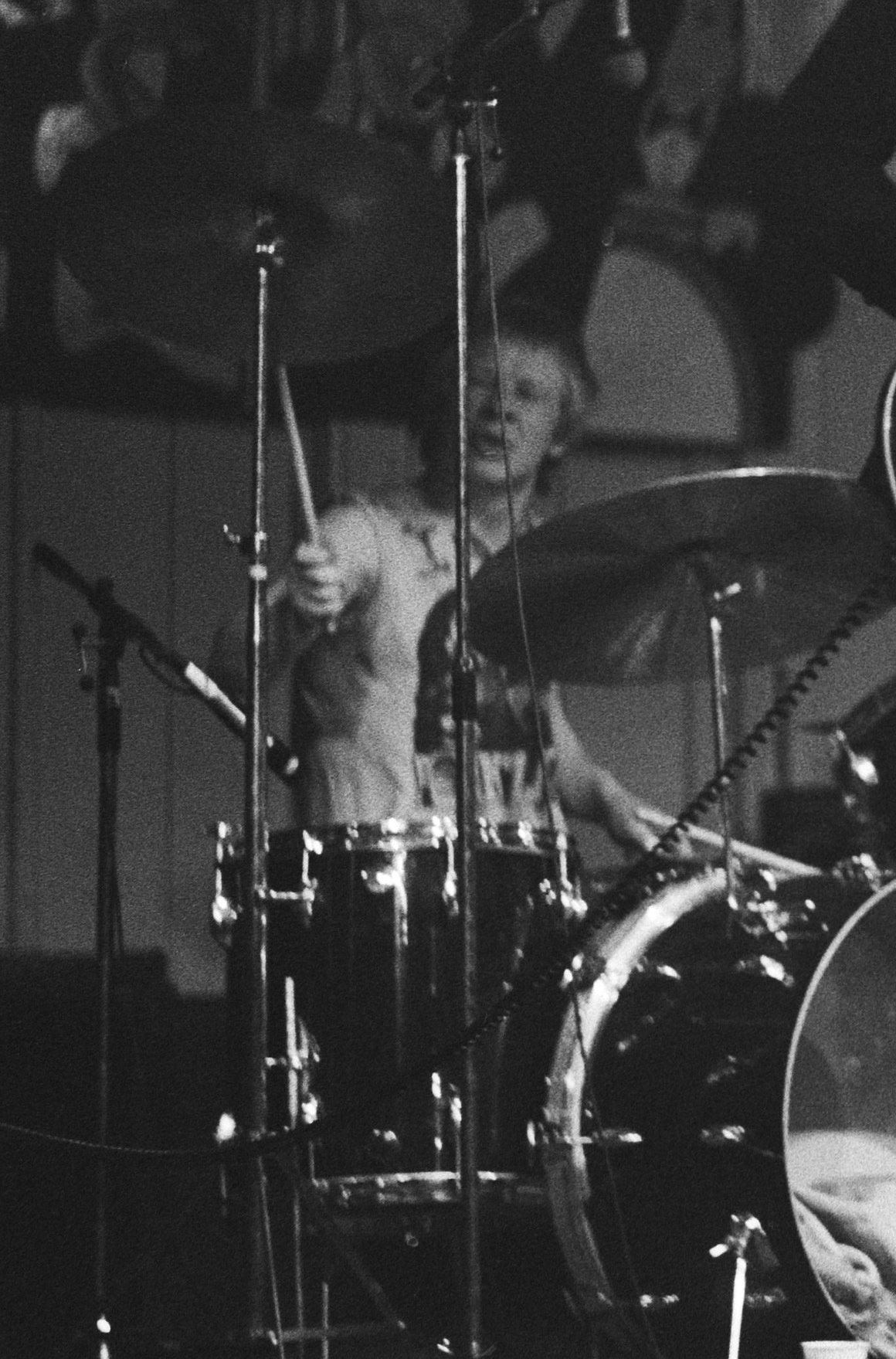
Cook playing with the Sex Pistols in Paradiso, Amsterdam, in 1977

Cook was raised in Hammersmith and attended the Christopher Wren School, now Phoenix High School, London, in White City Estate, Shepherd's Bush, where he met Steve Jones. The pair became friends, and while skipping school, in 1972–1973, Cook and Jones, along with their school friend Wally Nightingale, formed a band, The Strand. Within the next three years the Strand evolved into the Sex Pistols.

Cook's early influences included Motown, ska and glam rock acts like David Bowie, T. Rex, Roxy Music and Slade, in addition to drummers Kenney Jones of the Faces, Paul Thompson of Roxy Music, Al Jackson Jr. and Mitch Mitchell of the Jimi Hendrix Experience.

Cook is portrayed by Jacob Slater in the 2022 Craig Pearce–Danny Boyle FX biographical drama miniseries Pistol.

== Later career ==
After the Sex Pistols suddenly broke up after their final concert in San Francisco on 14 January 1978, Cook and Jones initially worked on the soundtrack to Julien Temple's film, The Great Rock 'n' Roll Swindle. The two also recorded a few songs using the Sex Pistols name, Cook singing lead on the album version of the song "Silly Thing". The pair then started a new band, the Professionals, with Andy Allan. Allan caused some legal problems; he played bass on "Silly Thing" and the first few Professionals recordings, but had no recording contract and had been neither credited nor paid. Consequently, the Virgin Records compilation album Cash Cows, which featured the Professionals' track "Kick Down the Doors", was withdrawn. Cook and Jones played together on Johnny Thunders' solo album, So Alone.

They released four singles, recorded a self-titled LP that was shelved until 1990, and released I Didn't See It Coming in November 1981. The band's American tour to promote the album was cut short when band members Cook, Paul Myers, and Ray McVeigh were injured in a car crash. While the Professionals did return to America in the Spring of 1982 after recovery, Jones and Myers' drug problems further hampered the band's prospects. They declined an opening spot offer on tour for the Clash, and broke up.

In the early 1980s, Cook, along with Jones, discovered the English new wave girl-group Bananarama. Cook helped the trio record their debut single, "Aie a Mwana", and acted as a producer on their 1982 debut album Deep Sea Skiving.

In the late 1980s, Cook surfaced with the group Chiefs of Relief with former Bow Wow Wow guitarist Matthew Ashman, and, after a period out of the music industry, played with Phil Collen in the 1990s. He also played on the Edwyn Collins song "A Girl Like You", beginning a longstanding association with Collins as a session musician. Cook reunited with the surviving Sex Pistols in 1996 for the Filthy Lucre world tour.

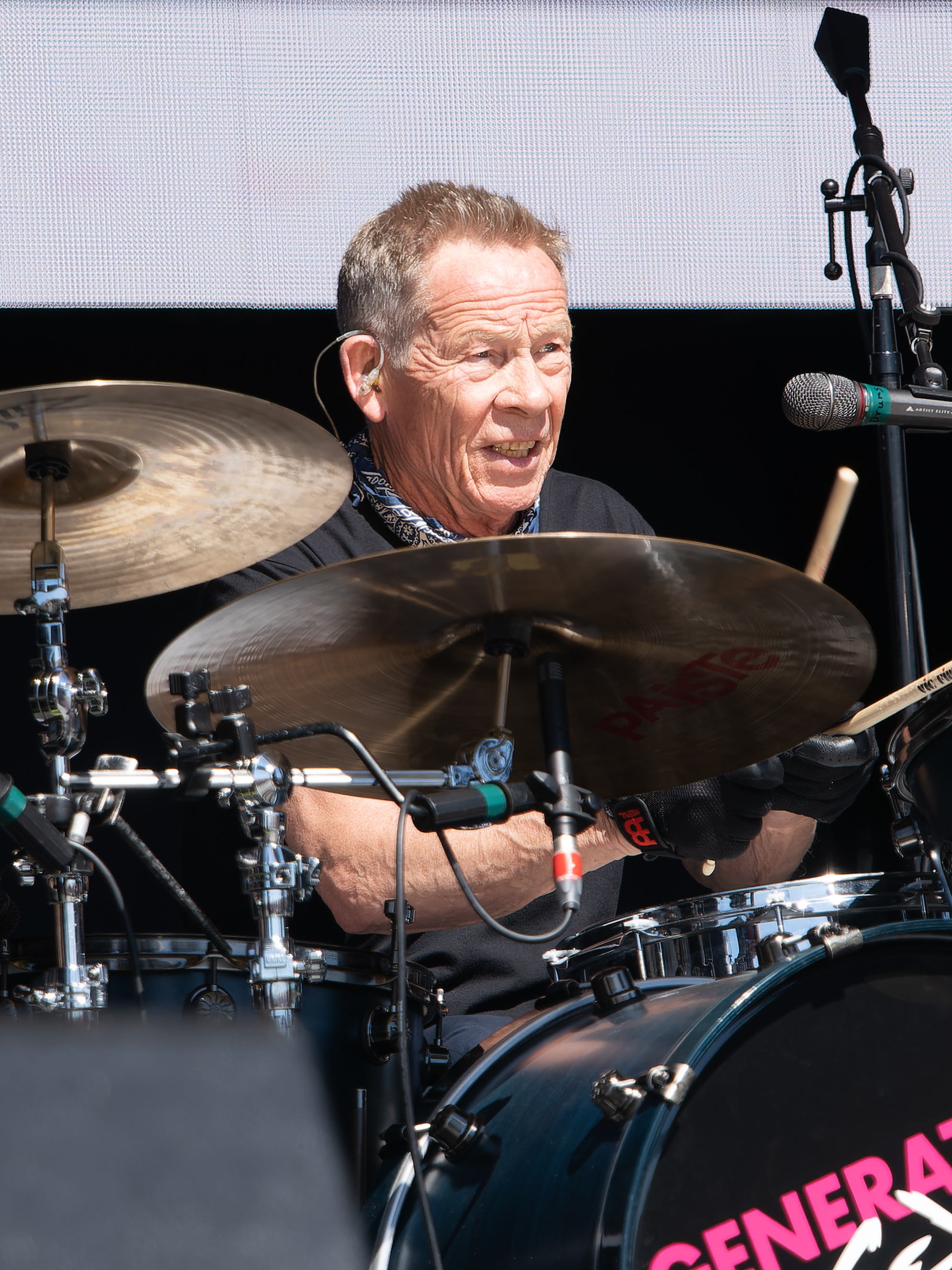
Cook performing with Generation Sex in 2023

The Sex Pistols, including Cook, played a gig for the 30th anniversary of Never Mind The Bollocks at the Brixton Academy on 8 November 2007. To meet demand, six further gigs were added, including two on 9 and 10 November.

In 2008, the Sex Pistols appeared at the Isle of Wight Festival as the headlining act on the Saturday night, the Peace and Love Festival in Sweden, the Live at Loch Lomond Festival in Scotland, and the Summercase Festival in Madrid.

Cook drummed with Man-Raze, which also featured Phil Collen from Def Leppard and their friend Simon Laffy who used to play in Collen's pre-Leppard band, Girl. They released a debut album Surreal in 2008, and toured throughout the UK in late 2009.

In 2011, Cook joined Vic Godard and Subway Sect, and renewed his collaborations with Paul Myers from the Professionals. Cook has worked with Godard, on and off, for the past two decades. They toured throughout 2012 and, in March 2012, recorded 1978 Now with Collins.

In celebration of the release of a three disc set (The Complete Professionals) by Universal Music Group for 16 October 2015, Cook, with Tom Spencer filling in for Steve Jones, reunited with the Professionals for a concert at the 100 Club. In January 2016, the band announced a three show tour for 17 to 19 March. A joint headline show featuring Rich Kids was announced at London's O2 Shepherd's Bush Empire for 16 May, then rescheduled for 23 June at the Academy Islington, due to the ongoing structural work at the venue.

On 30 October 2018, Cook and Steve Jones joined Billy Idol and Tony James, formerly of Generation X, for a free entry performance at The Roxy in Hollywood, Los Angeles, under the name Generation Sex, playing a combined set of the two former bands' material. The band reunited in 2023 for a European tour that included several festival appearances.

== Personal life ==
Cook lives in Mayfair with his wife, Jeni Cook, formerly of Culture Club, and their daughter, Hollie Cook, a solo musician. Cook also played football for Hollywood United.

== Discography ==
With Sex Pistols

- Never Mind the Bollocks, Here's the Sex Pistols (1977)
- The Great Rock 'n' Roll Swindle (1979)

With Johnny Thunders

- So Alone (1978)

With Joan Jett

- Joan Jett (1980); re-released as Bad Reputation (1981)

With The Professionals

- I Didn't See It Coming (1981)
- The Professionals (1997)
- What in the World (2017)
- SNAFU (2021)

With Chiefs of Relief

- Chiefs of Relief (1988)

With Edwyn Collins

- Gorgeous George (1994)
- I'm Not Following You (1997)
- Doctor Syntax (2002)
- Home Again (2007)
- Losing Sleep (2010)
- Understated (2013)

With Ian Brown

- The World Is Yours (2007)

With Man Raze

- Surreal (2008)
- PunkFunkRootsRock (2011)
