= Losing Sleep (Edwyn Collins album) =

Studio album by Edwyn Collins
- Released: 13 September 2010
- Recorded: West Heath Studios
- Genres: Indie, soul
- Length: 42:29
- Label: Heavenly
- Producers: Edwyn Collins, Sebastian Lewsley

Edwyn Collins chronology
| Home Again (2007) | Losing Sleep (2010) | Understated (2013) |

Singles from Losing Sleep
- 1. "Losing Sleep" Released: 2010; 2. "Do It Again" Released: 2010; 3. "In Your Eyes" Released: 2011

Professional ratings
Review scores
| Source | Rating |
|---|---|
| AllMusic | 3.5/5 stars |
| Drowned in Sound | link |
| The Guardian | link |
| Mojo | 8/10 stars |
| MusicOMH | link |
| NME | link |
| Pitchfork | link |

Losing Sleep is the seventh solo album by Scottish singer-songwriter Edwyn Collins, released on 13 September 2010 on Heavenly Records.

The album was recorded at Collins' West Heath Studios and features guest appearances from Franz Ferdinand's Alex Kapranos and Nick McCarthy, Aztec Camera's Roddy Frame, Johnny Marr, the Cribs' Ryan Jarman and Jacob Graham, Connor Hanwick and Jonathan Pierce of the Drums.

It reached number 54 on the UK Albums Chart upon its week of release, and is his most successful album since 1994's Gorgeous George.

== Track listing ==
All tracks written by Edwyn Collins, except where noted

1. "Losing Sleep" – 3:21
2. "What Is My Role?" (feat. Ryan Jarman) – 4:20 (Collins/Jarman)
3. "Do It Again" (feat. Alex Kapranos and Nick McCarthy) – 3:12 (Collins/Kapranos/McCarthy)
4. "Humble" – 3:22
5. "Come Tomorrow, Come Today" (feat. Johnny Marr) – 2:58 (Collins/Marr)
6. "Bored" – 4:25
7. "In Your Eyes" (feat. The Drums) – 4:07 (Collins/The Drums)
8. "I Still Believe in You" (feat. Ryan Jarman) – 3:33 (Collins/Jarman)
9. "Over the Hill" – 3:35
10. "It Dawns on Me" (feat. Romeo Stodart) – 3:53 (Collins/Stodart)
11. "All My Days" (feat. Roddy Frame) – 3:15 (Collins/Frame)
12. "Searching for the Truth" – 2:18

== Personnel ==
- Edwyn Collins – vocals, vibes (track 1), harmonica (track 12)
- Paul Cook – drums (track 1, 3, 5, 10)
- Dave Ruffy – drums (track 2, 4, 6, 8, 9)
- Barrie Cadogan – guitar (track 1, 9), bass (track 1, 9)
- Carwyn Ellis – guitar (track 6, 7, 12), bass (track 3, 4, 6, 8, 10), backing vocals (track 1, 5, 10), moog synthesizer (track 8), Univox keyboards (track 7), wurlitzer (track 3, 7), piano (track 4, 5)
- Sean Read – saxophone (track 9), wurlitzer (track 6, 10, 11), vibraphone (track 9), backing vocals (track 4, 9, 10, 11), organ (track 10)
- Andy Hackett – guitar (track 4)
- Ryan Jarman - guitar, vocals (track 2, 8) bass (track 2)
- Luca Santucci – backing vocals (track 1)
- Barbara Snow – trumpet (track 1)
- Richard Sutton – saxophone (track 1)
- Sebastian Lewsley - backing vocals (track 2)
- Alex Kapranos - guitar, vocals (track 3)
- Nick McCarthy - guitar, Moog, organ, vocals (track 3)
- Johnny Marr - guitar, bass (track 5)
- Jonathan Pierce - vocals (track 7)
- Jacob Graham - guitar (track 7)
- Adam Kessler - guitar (track 7)
- Connor Hanwick - drums (track 7)
- Romeo Stodart - guitar, vocals (track 10)
- Roddy Frame - guitar, backing vocals (track 11)
- Will Collins - drums (track 11)

== Production ==
- Producer: Edwyn Collins, Sebastian Lewsley
- Engineer: Sebastian Lewsley
- Mixing: Sebastian Lewsley, Edwyn Collins
- Arranger: Edwyn Collins

== Album artwork ==
- Original bird illustrations: Edwyn Collins
- Sleeve design: Edwyn Collins, Paul Kelly
- Front cover design: Liberty
- Edwyn Collins photo: Paul Kelly
- Microphone Photographs: Sebastian Lewsley and Robert Sharp
