= A Casual Introduction 1981/2001 =

Compilation album by Edwyn Collins
- Released: 18 March 2003
- Recorded: 1981–2001
- Genre: Rock
- Length: 73:17
- Label: Setanta

Edwyn Collins chronology
| Doctor Syntax (2002) | A Casual Introduction 1981/2001 (2003) | Home Again (2007) |

A Casual Introduction 1981/2001 is an album by Scottish musician Edwyn Collins. It is a collection of both his solo work and also work of Orange Juice, the band he fronted from 1979 to the mid-80s.

The 'Intermediate Mix' of "Rip It Up" is a mixture of the original version and the 12" release, only available on this compilation. "The Witch Queen of New Orleans" is also only available on this album and is, therefore, the only version.

It was released in 2003.

== Track listing ==
| No. | Title | Length |
|---|---|---|
| 1. | "A Girl Like You" | 3:59 |
| 2. | "What Presence?!" | 3:58 |
| 3. | "The Magic Piper (Of Love)" | 3:17 |
| 4. | "Rip It Up (Intermediate Mix)" | 4:57 |
| 5. | "A Sad Lament" | 4:44 |
| 6. | "The Witch Queen of New Orleans" (Long Version) | 4:04 |
| 7. | "Johnny Teardrop" (Single Mix) | 3:50 |
| 8. | "Gorgeous George" | 4:17 |
| 9. | "Ghost Of A Chance" | 4:06 |
| 10. | "The Campaign For Real Rock" | 6:37 |
| 11. | "Hope And Despair" | 3:24 |
| 12. | "Falling And Laughing" | 3:50 |
| 13. | "Keep On Burning" | 4:07 |
| 14. | "Adidas World" | 2:29 |
| 15. | "Felicity" | 2:35 |
| 16. | "Tenterhook" | 5:01 |
| 17. | "Witchcraft" | 4:25 |
| 18. | "Graciously" | 3:37 |
