= The Possibilities Are Endless =

The Possibilities Are Endless is a 2014 documentary film which follows Scottish singer-songwriter Edwyn Collins, the frontman of Orange Juice, as he recovers after two cerebral hemorrhages in 2005 which caused hemiplegia and near-total aphasia. It was directed by James Hall and Edward Lovelace.
