= Chiefs of Relief =

British rock group

- Origin: Britain
- Genres: Rock, new wave, electronic, hip hop
- Years active: 1984–1989, 2010
- Label: Polydor
- Past members: Matthew Ashman; Paul Cook; Duncan Grieg; Lance Burman; David Barbarossa; Leigh Gorman

Chiefs of Relief were a British rock group with a unique electro-punk style, punctuated by the guitar work of vocalist Matthew Ashman, and also featuring drummer Paul Cook. The Chiefs fused rock with hip hop and electronic elements from the era but it was as a live outfit that they excelled.

== Career ==
The band was formed shortly after the demise of new wave band Bow Wow Wow in 1983. An early line-up included former Bow Wow Wow members Matthew Ashman (who for a brief time tried to continue Bow Wow Wow as their lead singer after they ousted the original singer Annabella Lwin, formed with remaining band members David Barbarossa and Leigh Gorman, with Paul Cook on drums. It later consisted of Ashman, Cook, keyboard player Duncan Grieg (previously the drummer with Martian Dance), and bassist Lance Burman.

The group's only album was 1988's self-titled release, which was issued in the US by Sire Records. Ashman died in 1995 and, on the fifteenth anniversary of his death, the band reunited for a tribute concert on 21 November 2010 at the Scala in London, in a show with Adam Ant topping the bill. It also featured later Ashman bands, Bow Wow Wow and Agent Provocateur.

== Discography ==
=== Studio album ===
- 1988 – Chiefs of Relief (Polydor Records)

=== Singles ===
- 1984 – "Holiday" b/w "I Don't Mind, She Don't Care" and "Holiday (Instrumental)" (MCA Records)
- 1985 – "Freedom to Rock" b/w "Dream Baby" (Where Artists Record)
- 1987 – "Weekend" b/w "Kiss of Life" (WEA)
- 1988 – "One Force, One Crew, One Song" (Polydor Records)
