= We Are Little Barrie =

Studio album by Little Barrie
- Released: 7 February 2005
- Genre: Alternative rock, UK R&B revival
- Length: 46:36
- Label: PIAS, Artemis Records
- Producer: Edwyn Collins, Little Barrie

Little Barrie chronology
| We Are Little Barrie (2005) | Stand Your Ground (2006) |

Professional ratings
Review scores
| Source | Rating |
|---|---|
| AllMusic | 4/5 stars |
| Pitchfork | (5.7/10) |
| The Guardian | 4/5 stars |

We Are Little Barrie is the debut album from Little Barrie, released on 7 February 2005 in the United Kingdom, followed by a United States release on 28 June 2005. They recorded the album over 23 weeks at producer Edwyn Collins’ West Heath Studios. Among the gear used in the studio were a ’62 Gibson ES-330, a Traynor Studio Mate, a Gretsch Chet Atkins and a Fender ’69 Vibralux 2x10. The mics were mostly old Neumanns—although the odd [Shure] SM57 was used, as well.

== Track listing ==
1. "Free Salute" – 3:51
2. "Burned Out" – 3:33
3. "Greener Pastures" – 3:36
4. "Be the One" – 3:50
5. "Please Tell Me" – 4:19
6. "Well and Truly Done" – 4:07
7. "Stone Reprise" – 1:03
8. "Stones Throw" – 2:46
9. "Long Hair" – 3:10
10. "Thinking on the Mind" – 3:29
11. "Move on So Easy" – 5:38
12. "Living in and Out of Place" – 5:09
13. "Freeprise" – 2:05

All songs written & arranged by Little Barrie.

== Personnel ==
=== Little Barrie ===
- Barrie Cadogan – guitars, vocals, piano (5), electronic organ (9)
- Wayne Fullwood – drums, vocals, piano (5), melodica & xylophone (10)
- Lewis Wharton – bass guitar

=== Additional musicians ===
- Edwyn Collins - electronic organ (2, 13), additional keys (2), Fender Rhodes bass (4), guitar (7) backing vocals (4,9), record producer
- Seb Lewsley - synthesizer (10), sound engineer

=== Production ===
- Production: Edwyn Collins & Little Barrie
- Engineered by Seb Lewsley
- Mastering: Chris Potter at Alchemy
- Recording: West Heath Studios
