= Stand Your Ground (Little Barrie album) =

Studio album by Little Barrie
- Released: 4 October 2006 (Japan); 29 January 2007 (UK/US)
- Genre: Indie rock
- Label: Hostess, PIAS, Artemis Records
- Producer: Dan the Automator and Little Barrie

Little Barrie chronology
We Are Little Barrie (2005)	Stand Your Ground (2006)	King of the Waves (2010)

Professional ratings
Review scores
Source	Rating
Twisted Ear	4.5/5 stars

Stand Your Ground is the second album by the band Little Barrie. The album is produced by Dan the Automator and Mike "Prince Fatty" Pelanconi. The band went for a more straight rock’n’roll sound in their own words as

a result of touring the first record ... we wanted more something more rock’n’roll to play on stage. And it’s partly because while we were touring we were getting back into stuff we hadn’t listened to for a while, like old garage stuff, and The Cramps. We thought it might be a bit more of a stripped-down, southern fried soul sort of thing. We expected it would maybe almost have a Lee Dorsey, Tony Joe White influence. But then we started getting into different things – started toughening the beats up, and getting into mad '50s reverb on the guitars. I became interested in the energy of those sounds, but still keeping the soulful thing in it. It sort of went a bit darker. We wanted this record to be less psychedelic than the last one, and there's less guitars on it.

They choose to work with The Automator

because of what he'd done with the Jon Spencer Blues Explosion. And also the thought of working with someone who wasn't a conventional rock producer. We thought he might come up with something a bit less conventional. And also cos the record was sort of inspired by soul and funk and maybe some dance music even.

Drumming on the record are new band recruit Billy Skinner and the Blues Explosion's Russell Simins. Hubert Sumlin joined the band in the studio, though he didn't appear in the final recording.

Some songs in Cadogan's words:

Just Wanna Play is dedicated to some friends of mine who got burned by a record label, Bailing Out was just a string of thoughts I wrote while we were on tour with DJ Format – 23 dates in 24 days: I'd forgotten about it, then played it in rehearsals, and this kind of bastardised Bo Diddley thing came out. Yeah We Know is just a string of thoughts on things I saw leaning out of a window where I used to live, the Marquis Estate in Islington, which was pretty notorious but we never had any problems. Green Eyed Fool is about a bit of jealousy and cynicism you get from people who haven't had the balls to do things for themselves.

== Track listing ==
1. "Bailing Out" 2:19
2. "Love You" 3:05
3. "Pin That Badge" 3:26
4. "Yeah We Know You" 3:47
5. "Green Eyed Fool" 3:34
6. "Pretty Pictures" 2:43
7. "Cash In" 5:04
8. "Just Wanna Play" 4:18
9. "Why Don't You Do It" 3:05
10. "Pay To Join" 4:36
11. "Girls and shoes" 2:04 (hidden track) Starting at time frame 5:19 of 'Pay To Join'
12. "If I Don't Have To Answer" (Japan bonus track)
