= Understated =

Studio album by Edwyn Collins
- Released: 25 March 2013
- Recorded: AED Records
- Genre: Indie
- Length: 41:08
- Label: AED
- Producer: Edwyn Collins and Sebastian Lewsley

Edwyn Collins chronology
Losing Sleep (2010)	Understated (2013)	Badbea (2019)

Professional ratings
Review scores
Source	Rating
AllMusic	4/5 stars
Drowned in Sound	8/10
The Guardian	4/5 stars
Mojo	4/5 stars
MusicOMH	4/5 stars
NME	7/10
Pitchfork	6.8/10

Understated is the eighth solo album by the Scottish singer/songwriter Edwyn Collins, released 25 March 2013 on AED Records. It is his first album released on his own label, and reached No. 66 on the UK Albums Chart. It was the last album he recorded at his West Heath Studio, London.

The album is both optimistic and autobiographical, reflecting Collins’ recovery from a major stroke in 2005. It was acclaimed in the music press with NME rating it 7/10, Pitchfork 6.8/10, and The Guardian and Mojo praising its resilience and charm.

== Track listing ==
All tracks composed by Edwyn Collins; except where indicated

1. "Dilemma" - 3:26
2. "Baby Jean" - 3:27
3. "Carry On, Carry On" - 4:05
4. "31 Years" - 3:58
5. "It's a Reason" - 4:06
6. "Too Bad (That's Sad)" - 3:20
7. "Down the Line" - 4:28
8. "Forsooth" - 4:10
9. "In the Now" - 3:46
10. "Understated" - 3:01
11. "Love's Been Good to Me" - 3:21 Rod McKuen

== Personnel ==
- Edwyn Collins – vocals, solina strings (track 3), memphis chords (track 4), strings, backing vox (track 9) mellotron (track 10)
- Carwyn Ellis – guitar (track 3, 6, 7), slide guitar (track 6), bass (track 2, 3, 6, 7, 8), mandolin (track 2), backing vocals (track 3, 5, 6, 8), moog synthesizer, Univox keyboards (track 4), wurlitzer (track 6), piano (track 6, 7), organ (track 8), All instruments (track 11)
- Paul Cook – drums (tracks 1–2, 6–10)
- Dave Ruffy – drums track 5
- Liam Hutton - drums (track 3)
- Rob Walbourne - drums (track 4)
- Barrie Cadogan – guitar (tracks 1, 2, 5, 8), bass (tracks 1, 5)
- Sean Read – flute, trumpet (track 1), vibraphone (track 1), saxophone (track 1, 2, 9), backing vox (track 1, 4, 5, 7, 10), wurlizter (track 2), glockenspiel (track 3, 8), organ (track 5, 7), percussion (track 8, 10)
- James Walbourne – guitars, (tracks 3, 4, 9 and 10) stomps (track 3), bass (track 4), backing vox (track 7)
- Sebastian Lewsey – wurlitzer (track 4)
- Will Collins - bass (track 9)

== Charts ==
Chart performance for Understated
Chart (2013)	Peak position
UK Albums (OCC)	66
