= Nation Shall Speak Unto Nation =

Studio album by Edwyn Collins
- Released: 14 March 2025
- Genre: Pop
- Length: 37:40
- Label: AED
- Producers: Edwyn Collins; Sean Read; Jake Hutton

Edwyn Collins chronology
Badbea (2019)	Nation Shall Speak Unto Nation (2025)

Singles from Nation Shall Speak Unto Nation
- 1. "Knowledge" Released: 15 January 2025

Nation Shall Speak Unto Nation is the tenth studio album by Scottish musician Edwyn Collins. It was released on 14 March 2025 via AED digitally. The album, produced by Collins with Sean Read and Jake Hutton, was preceded by his 2019 release, Badbea. It was recorded in Clashnarrow Studio of Helmsdale. "Knowledge" was released as a single on 15 January 2025, alongside a music video directed by Delbert Anthonio Wright.

== Reception ==
Professional ratings
Review scores
Source	Rating
AllMusic	4/5 stars
Clash	8/10
God Is in the TV	8/10
The Guardian	4/5 stars
MusicOMH	4/5 stars
Record Collector	4/5 stars
The Telegraph	4/5 stars
Uncut	4/5 stars

The album received a four-star rating from Record Collector, whose reviewer David Pollock stated, "All of this music is a blast, an affecting display of the emotional textures which Collins has always dealt in so confidently, regardless of his health issues," and Uncut writer Alastair McKay, who opined, "Musically, the tunes blend pop stickiness with sonic experimentation, but there is a strong sense of place."

In a four-star review for the Guardian, Phil Mongredien stated, "Indeed, his lyrics are equally thoughtful and thought-provoking throughout, the musicianship sensitive and never seizing the spotlight from his still distinctive baritone." Also rating it four stars, Neil McCormick of the Telegraph referred to it as "a gentle album of life-enhancing positivity." God Is in the TV gave the album a rating of eight, describing it as "an album that shows where he's at at this point in his career, and the sense that he is content."

Robin Murray of Clash also assigned it a rating of eight, opining "Confident throughout, there's a sense of Edwyn matching his incredible wealth of experience to the joy of music-making." Tim Sendra, writing for AllMusic, called it one of "Edwyn's best work." John Murphy, in a four-star review for MusicOMH, referred to it as "a collection of 11 instantly likeable songs that, from the title onwards, seem to touch on communication issues, growing old and lessons that life can teach you."

== Track listing ==
Nation Shall Speak Unto Nation track listing
No.	Title	Length
1.	"Knowledge"	3:15
2.	"Paper Planes"	3:52
3.	"The Heart Is a Foolish Little Thing"	3:00
4.	"The Mountains Are My Home"	3:01
5.	"Strange Old World"	3:11
6.	"Nation Shall Speak Unto Nation"	3:17
7.	"Sound as a Pound"	2:38
8.	"The Bridge Hotel"	3:30
9.	"A Little Sign"	4:51
10.	"It Must Be Real"	3:49
11.	"Rhythm Is My Own World"	3:16
Total length:		37:40

== Charts ==
Chart performance for Nation Shall Speak Unto Nation
Chart (2025)	Peak position
UK Americana Albums (Official Charts)	4
UK Independent Albums (Official Charts)	7
Scottish Albums (Official Charts)	8
