= Home Again (Edwyn Collins album) =

Studio album by Edwyn Collins
- Released: 17 September 2007
- Recorded: 2004
- Genre: Indie
- Length: 46:11
- Label: Heavenly
- Producer: Edwyn Collins

Edwyn Collins chronology
| A Casual Introduction 1981/2001 (2003) | Home Again (2007) | Losing Sleep (2010) |

Home Again is the sixth solo album by former Orange Juice singer Edwyn Collins, released 17 September 2007 on Heavenly Records.

Professional ratings
Review scores
| Source | Rating |
|---|---|
| AllMusic | 4/5 stars |
| Gigwise | 3.5/5 stars |
| The Guardian | 4/5 stars |
| The Independent | 3/5 stars |
| MusicOMH | link |
| NME | link |
| The Observer | link |
| Pitchfork | link |
| Stylus Magazine | B |
| The Times | 4/5 stars |
| Yahoo UK | 8/10 stars |

The album was recorded at Collins' West Heath Studios in the winter of 2004 but was not completed until early 2007. In the interim, Collins' suffered two brain haemorrhages in February 2005 and was hospitalised for most of that year. After a long recovery process, he returned to his studio to mix the album in the winter of 2006 with the help of engineer Seb Lewsley.

== Track listing ==
All tracks composed by Edwyn Collins

1. "One Is a Lonely Number" - 5:22
2. "Home Again" - 3:12
3. "You'll Never Know (My Love)" - 3:37
4. "7th Son" - 3:51
5. "Leviathan" - 4:29
6. "It's in Your Heart" - 2:48
7. "Superstar Talking Blues" - 2:57
8. "Liberteenage Rag" - 3:27
9. "A Heavy Sigh" - 5:27
10. "Written in Stone" - 4:05
11. "One Track Mind" - 3:38
12. "Then I Cried" - 3:18

The album was preceded by the single release of "You'll Never Know", on 10 September 2007.

== Personnel ==
- Edwyn Collins – vocals, guitar, keyboards, organ, backing vocals
- Carwyn Ellis – slide guitar, bass, drums, backing vocals, congas, twelve-string guitar, electric pianoguitar,
- Paul Cook – drums
- Barrie Cadogan – slide guitar, bass
- Andy Hackett – lead guitar
- Luca Santucci – backing vocals
- Pete Lockett - congas
- James Walbourne - slide guitar

== Production ==
- Producer: Edwyn Collins, Sebastian Lewsley
- Engineer: Sebastian Lewsley
- Mixing: Sebastian Lewsley, Edwyn Collins
- Arranger: Edwyn Collins
