= I'm Not Following You =

Studio album by Edwyn Collins
- Released: 1997
- Recorded: 1996–1997
- Genre: Rock
- Length: 55:01
- Label: Setanta
- Producer: Edwyn Collins

Edwyn Collins chronology
Gorgeous George (1994)	I'm Not Following You (1997)	Doctor Syntax (2002)

Professional ratings
Review scores
Source	Rating
AllMusic	4/5 stars
NME	5/10
Pitchfork	3.0/10
Uncut	4/5 stars
Wall of Sound	60/100

I'm Not Following You is an album by Scottish musician Edwyn Collins, released in 1997.

== Track listing ==
All tracks composed by Edwyn Collins; except where indicated

1. "It's a Steal" - 5:23
2. "The Magic Piper (Of Love)" - 3:49
3. "Seventies Night" (Collins, Mark E. Smith) - 4:58
4. "No One Waved Goodbye" - 4:35
5. "Downer" - 4:05
6. "Keep on Burning" - 4:09
7. "Running Away with Myself" - 4:19
8. "Country Rock" - 4:34
9. "For the Rest of My Life" - 4:17
10. "Superficial Cat" - 5:10
11. "Adidas World" - 2:28
12. "I'm Not Following You" - 7:28

== Personnel ==
- Edwyn Collins - guitar, keyboards, percussion, programming, vocals
- Andrew Hackett, Boz Boorer - guitar
- Sebastian Lewsley - programming
- David Ruffy, Peter Jones, Paul Cook - drums
- Clare Kenny - bass
- Naomi Samuel - cello
- David Munday - flute
- Martin Drover - trumpet, flugelhorn
- Phil Thornalley - bass guitar, Wurlitzer
- Mark E. Smith - vocals on "Seventies Night"
- Sean Read - keyboards, baritone saxophone, backing vocals
- Marcia McDonald - backing vocals
