= Badbea (album) =

Studio album by Edwyn Collins
- Released: 29 March 2019
- Recorded: AED Records
- Genre: Indie
- Length: 41:08
- Label: AED
- Producers: Edwyn Collins and Sean Read

Edwyn Collins chronology
Understated (2013)	Badbea (2019)	Nation Shall Speak Unto Nation (2025)

Professional ratings
Aggregate scores
Source	Rating
Metacritic	85/100
Review scores
Source	Rating
AllMusic	4.5/5 stars
Clash	8/10
The Guardian	3/5 stars
Mojo	4/5 stars
MusicOMH	4.5/5 stars
The Observer	4/5 stars
Q	4/5 stars
Record Collector	4/5 stars
Uncut	9/10

Badbea is the ninth solo album by the Scottish singer-songwriter Edwyn Collins, released on 29 March 2019, his second release on his own label, AED Records.

It was recorded at his new studio, Clashnarrow, Helmsdale, near his home, after he relocated from London. Collins has strong ancestral connections to the area — his family lived in Sutherland for generations, and he often visited as a child.

The album's name comes from a ruined clearance village in northern Scotland, near Collins' home.

== Track listing ==
All tracks written by Edwyn Collins except where indicated.

1. "It's All About You" – 3:37 (Collins, Sean Read)
2. "In the Morning" – 3:25
3. "I Guess We Were Young" – 3:24
4. "It All Makes Sense to Me" – 2:54 (Collins, Carwyn Ellis)
5. "Outside" – 1:57
6. "Glasgow to London" – 4:00
7. "Tensions Rising" – 3:17
8. "Beauty" – 2:48
9. "I Want You" – 3:43 (Collins, Carwyn Ellis)
10. "I'm OK Jack" – 2:57 (Collins, Sean Read)
11. "Sparks the Spark" – 4:22
12. "Badbea" – 4:27

== Personnel ==
- Edwyn Collins – vocals
- Carwyn Ellis – guitar (track 6, 7, 9, 12), acoustic guitar (track 3, 4, 8), bass (track 2, 3, 5, 7, 8, 9, 11, 12), backing vocals (track 2, 3, 5, 9, 11), bass synth (track 6), keys (track 4, 6, 9, 11, 12), auto harp (track 12), piano (track 12),
- Jake Hutton - drums (track 1-7, 9, 11, 12)
- Sean Read – trumpet (track 2, 3), keys (track 10), saxophone (track 6, 7, 10), backing vox (track 3, 5, 6, 7, 10, 11), wurlitzer (track 12), organ (track 7, 8), percussion (track 3, 6, 7, 10), drum programming, synth bass (track 6), whistling (track 3)
- James Walbourne – guitars (tracks 3, 5, 11) acoustic guitar (track 8), backing vox (track 5)
- Chay Heney - guitar and bass (track 1)
- Howard Gott - violins and viola (track 4)
- Sarah Wilson - cello (track 4)
