= A Girl Like You (Edwyn Collins song) =

1994 single by Edwyn Collins

Single by Edwyn Collins

from the album Gorgeous George
- B-side: "If You Could Love Me"
- Released: 5 December 1994
- Genre: Alternative rock; glam rock; Northern soul
- Length: 3:59
- Label: Setanta
- Songwriter: Edwyn Collins
- Producer: Edwyn Collins

Edwyn Collins singles chronology
"If You Could Love Me" (1995)	"A Girl Like You" (1994)	"Make Me Feel Again" (1995)

Music video
- "A Girl Like You" on YouTube

"A Girl Like You" is a song by Scottish singer-songwriter Edwyn Collins from his third solo studio album, Gorgeous George (1994). It was released as a single in December 1994 by Setanta Records and peaked at number four on the UK singles chart. Outside the United Kingdom, "A Girl Like You" topped the charts of Flanders and Iceland and peaked within the top 10 in several countries, including Australia, France, Germany and Sweden.

There were two music videos made for the song: one directed by John Flansburgh, and another by Gavin Evans. NME ranked "A Girl Like You" number 38 in their "NME Writers' Top 50 Singles of 1995", while Spin ranked it number eight in their list of the 20 best singles of 1995. The song was later sampled by Uniting Nations for their song "Everything About You".

== Background and production ==
Collins both wrote and produced the song, and said it was about a "mythical girl". The Sex Pistols drummer Paul Cook performed on the recording. The song had started out as "a more thrashy kind of guitar thing. The main rhythm track is based on a sample of the 1965 Len Barry track "1-2-3".

== Critical reception ==
Steve Baltin from Cash Box wrote that Collins "has one of the year's more surprising hits with this very Bowie-esque song that's been all over Modern Rock for the past month." He added, "Slightly funky and very catchy, 'A Girl Like You' is a track that will get under your skin." In his weekly UK chart commentary, James Masterton declared it as "magical", noting that here "hardcore Northern Soul meets the 1990s to delicious effect." Cathi Unsworth from Melody Maker viewed it as a "John Barry-spiked thriller" and a "little mystery", where "Collins sings with demonic relish over creepy jazz piano and fretful guitars. Overtly cool." A reviewer from Music Week gave it four out of five, commenting, "Ignored by the UK last November but scoring throughout the rest of Europe, the white-soul-swinging track gets a timely re-release." Music & Media praised it as a "absolutely superb pop track", that "should serve as EHR's sound salvation." Music & Media editor Robbert Tilli named it a "wonderfully old-fashioned" pop single.

Keith Cameron from NME called it a "flared nostril Motown-patented stomp". Mark Sutherland, also of NME, wrote, "So while, to us, the chart success of 'A Girl Like You' may seem but a curious sideshow to the whole Britpop fandango, to Edwyn it must surely be glorious vindication: proof positive that the world will listen. Even if Belgium, where 'A Girl Like You' reached Number One FIRST time around, has to lead the way." Sutherland added that its "mix of pop classicism and indie off-kilterness is a great deal more at home in a Top 40 where something as bonkers as Robson & Jerome rules the roost." Charles Aaron from Spin commented that here, Collins "opens his throat (and maybe even his heart), crooning with what sounds like aching conviction, "You've made me acknowledge the devil in me / I hope to God I'm talkin' metaphorically." The production is irresistibly off-beat with Spectorish drums, tinkling vibes, laconically searing fuzz guitar and squishy faux-turntable scratches. Plus, I love the way he pronounces "protest singers" (rhymes with "Miss Otis lingers")."

In 2024, Tom Eames of Smooth Radio ranked it the 58th best song of the 1990s.

== Track listings ==
- CD single
1. "A Girl Like You" – 3:59
2. "A Girl Like You" (Macramé remix by Youth) – 5:42
- French CD single
1. "A Girl Like You" – 3:59
2. "Out of This World" (Remixé par St-Etienne) – 4:58
- CD maxi
1. "A Girl Like You"
2. "Don't Shilly Shally"
3. "Something's Brewing"
4. "Bring It On Back"
- Cassette single
1. "A Girl Like You" – 3:59
2. "If You Could Love Me" (acoustic version)
- CD maxi
1. "A Girl Like You"
2. "If You Could Love Me" (acoustic version)
3. "Don't Shilly Shally" (spotter's 86 demo version)
4. "You're on Your Own"

== Charts ==
=== Weekly charts ===
Chart (1995)	Peak position
Australia (ARIA)	6
Austria (Ö3 Austria Top 40)	7
Belgium (Ultratop 50 Flanders)	1
Belgium (Ultratop 50 Wallonia)	5
Canada Top Singles (RPM)	16
Canada Rock/Alternative (RPM)	9
Denmark (IFPI)	6
Europe (Eurochart Hot 100)	13
Europe (European Hit Radio)	13
Finland (Suomen virallinen lista)	11
France (SNEP)	4
Germany (GfK)	3
Iceland (Íslenski Listinn Topp 40)	1
Ireland (IRMA)	8
Netherlands (Dutch Top 40)	16
Netherlands (Single Top 100)	18
New Zealand (Recorded Music NZ)	36
Norway (VG-lista)	7
Scottish Singles Sales (Official Charts)	5
Sweden (Sverigetopplistan)	4
Switzerland (Schweizer Hitparade)	9
UK Singles (Official Charts)	4
UK Airplay (Music Week)	1
UK Indie (Music Week)	1
US Billboard Hot 100	32
US Alternative Airplay (Billboard)	7
US Pop Airplay (Billboard)	32
US Cash Box Top 100	28

Chart (2012)	Peak position
UK Singles (Official Charts)	56

=== Year-end charts ===
Chart (1995)	Position
Australia (ARIA)	56
Austria (Ö3 Austria Top 40)	38
Belgium (Ultratop 50 Flanders)	21
Belgium (Ultratop 50 Wallonia)	10
Europe (Eurochart Hot 100)	25
Europe (European Hit Radio)	30
France (SNEP)	19
Germany (Media Control)	14
Iceland (Íslenski Listinn Topp 40)	22
Sweden (Topplistan)	34
Switzerland (Schweizer Hitparade)	31
UK Singles (OCC)	51
UK Airplay (Music Week)	5
US Modern Rock Tracks (Billboard)	32

Chart (1996)	Position
UK Airplay (Music Week)	34

== Certifications ==
Region	Certification	Certified units/sales
Australia (ARIA)	Gold	35,000^{^}
France (SNEP)	Silver	125,000^{*}
Germany (BVMI)	Gold	250,000^{^}
United Kingdom (BPI)	Gold	400,000^{‡}
^{*} Sales figures based on certification alone.^{^} Shipments figures based on certification alone.^{‡} Sales+streaming figures based on certification alone.

== Release history ==
Region	Date	Format(s)	Label(s)	Ref.
Australia	5 December 1994	CD: CD1	MDS; Setanta	
Australia	12 December 1994	CD: CD2	MDS; Setanta	
Australia	13 February 1995	Cassette	MDS; Setanta	
United Kingdom	5 June 1995	7-inch vinyl; CD; cassette	Setanta	
Japan	6 December 1995	CD	Rail	

== Appearances ==
The song appeared on the soundtrack of the 1995 film Empire Records and on that of the 2003 film Charlie's Angels: Full Throttle. It was featured in season 1, episode 5 of Lucifer ("Sweet Kicks"), and in the 2022 horror film Goodnight Mommy. It plays over the end credits in season 5, episode 7 of The Crown. Sabrina Spellman and her date Chad Corey Dylan dance to this song in season 1, episode 5 of Sabrina, the Teenage Witch ("Dream Date") and it's used in Ted Lasso in Season 3. It is also used in the pilot episode of The Decameron.

== See also ==
- Ultratop 50 number-one hits of 1995
