= Doctor Syntax (album) =

Studio album by Edwyn Collins
- Released: 29 April 2002
- Recorded: 2000–2002
- Genre: Rock
- Length: 53:55
- Label: Setanta
- Producer: Edwyn Collins

Edwyn Collins chronology
| I'm Not Following You (1997) | Doctor Syntax (2002) | A Casual Introduction 1981/2001 (2003) |

Professional ratings
Review scores
| Source | Rating |
|---|---|
| AllMusic | 4/5 stars |
| The Boston Phoenix | 3/5 stars |
| The Guardian | 4/5 stars |
| RTÉ.ie | 2/5 stars |
| Stylus Magazine | A |

Doctor Syntax is an album by Scottish musician Edwyn Collins. It was released in 2002. Its title comes from The Three Tours of Dr. Syntax, a comic poem by William Combe and cartoonist Thomas Rowlandson.

The album cover is a painting of Russian Romantic writer and poet Mikhail Lermontov.

== Track listing ==
All tracks composed by Edwyn Collins; except where indicated

1. "Never Felt Like This" – 4:15
2. "Should've Done That" – 4:23
3. "Mine Is At" – 4:58
4. "No Idea" – 4:51
5. "The Beatles" – 5:24
6. "Back to the Back Room" – 5:15
7. "Splitting Up" – 6:21
8. "Johnny Teardrop" – 4:11
9. "20 Years Too Late" – 5:06
10. "It's a Funny Thing" – 4:23
11. "Calling on You" – 4:48
12. "Message for Jojo" (Collins, Bernard Butler)
13. "After All (I Live My Life)" (Frankie Miller, Jim Morris)
14. "Stars in My Eyes"

== Personnel ==
- Edwyn Collins - vocals
- Sebastian Lewsley - programming, engineering, mixing
- Paul Cook - drums
