= Little Barrie =

Indie rock group from Nottingham, England

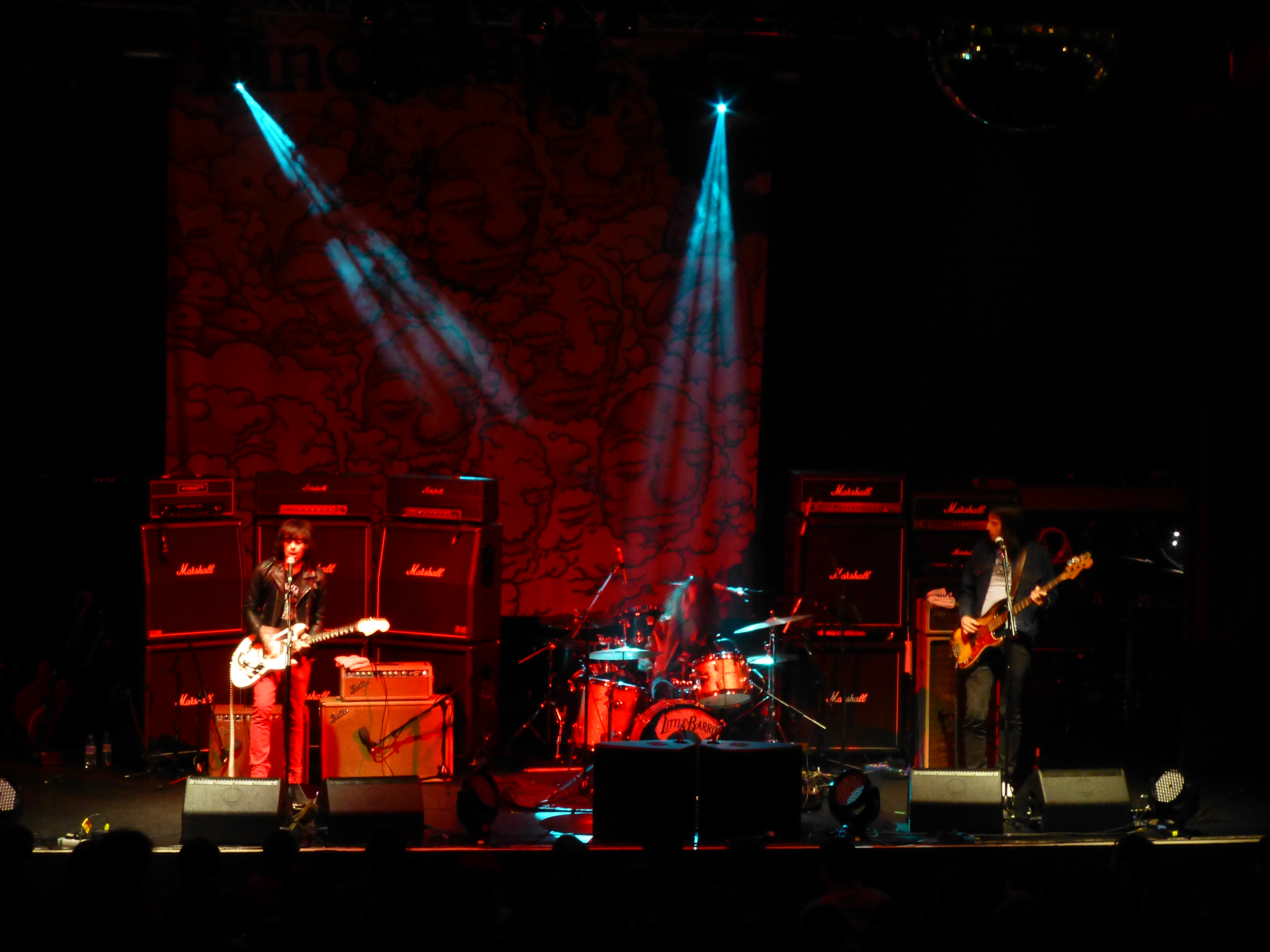
- Little Barrie supporting Dinosaur Jr. at the Ritz, Manchester, in 2013

Background information
- Origin: Nottingham, England
- Genres: Alternative rock; garage rock; R&B; neo-psychedelia; soul rock; funk rock; freakbeat
- Years active: 2000–present
- Labels: Non Deluxe, Tummy Touch Records, Hostess, Bumpman Records, PIAS, Stark Reality
- Members: Barrie Cadogan; Lewis Wharton; Tony Coote
- Past members: Billy Skinner; Wayne Fullwood; Virgil Howe
- Website: Official website

Little Barrie are an English rock group consisting of Barrie Cadogan (vocals, guitar) and Lewis Wharton (bass, vocals) and Tony Coote (drums). Virgil Howe contributed drums and vocals from 2007 until his death in 2017. Their sound has drawn from a mixture of influences including freakbeat, garage rock, UK R&B, neo-psychedelia, surf rock, krautrock, funk and rock and roll.

== Band history ==
The first Little Barrie single, "Shrug Off Love" / "Reply Me (It Don't Deny Me)", was released in summer 2000. It originated from a demo recorded in 1999 by Cadogan with friends Chris Lee on drums and Miles Newbold engineering the sessions and also playing organ. Shortly after, Cadogan met drummer Wayne Fullwood, and they began writing together as a duo. The pair played a handful of gigs before relocating to London in September 2000, where they met bassist Lewis Wharton. The trio began playing around London clubs in late 2000 and cut two further singles, "Don't Call It The Truth" / "Give Me A Microphone" in 2001 and "Memories Well" / "Didn't Mean A Thing" in 2002. The early sound of the band was influenced by the rhythms of early soul, funk and R&B.

After sessions in London with producer Edwyn Collins the band released their debut album, We Are Little Barrie in 2005. Following the album's release the band toured in Europe, Japan, Australia and the US before returning in late summer 2005 to begin writing their second album Stand Your Ground, produced by Dan the Automator. Wayne Fullwood left the band during the writing period. Billy Skinner joined the band on drums and work continued on the album in the UK with Mike "Prince Fatty" Pelanconi as producer. It was released in 2007. Alongside the bands' R&B and funk inspirations Stand Your Ground featured hints of rockabilly.

Following further tours across Europe, Japan and Australia, in 2007, the band backed Paul Weller on the title track of his album 22 Dreams. In late 2007, Virgil Howe, son of Yes guitarist Steve Howe, replaced Skinner on drums. The first recordings featuring the new lineup were in March 2008, when, alongside Martin Duffy on keys, the trio backed French Polynesian artist Mareva Galanter on her album Happy Fiu.

Throughout 2009, the band toured and continued writing their third album, King of the Waves. King of the Waves was released in Japan in December 2010 and in the UK and US in summer 2011. The album is harder-edged than previous recordings, leaning more towards surf and garage sounds with a greater use of overdriven guitars, feedback and tougher bass and drums from Wharton and Howe. The album's opening track, 'Surf Hell', became popular through its use on the game Rocksmith and several synchs on television. The song 'Money in Paper' featured a backing vocal from Edwyn Collins.

Following the release of King of the Waves they hit the road again in Japan and across Europe. In November 2011, the band opened for rising New York soul singer Charles Bradley and his band The Extroadinaires for two shows in Spain. Little Barrie were the opening band on Charles Bradley's US tour on the East Coast in February–March 2012. Two more US tours followed that year, spanning the east and west coasts as well as performing in Texas and the Midwest.

During 2012, work began on writing new songs for the band's fourth album Shadow. The band continued its tour, including a return to the US for shows in Texas and also opening for Dinosaur Jr and The Jon Spencer Blues Explosion before supporting The Stone Roses at La Cigalle in Paris in June. The group then performed in Vietnam and Japan before returning to rehearse tracks for the new album to be recorded that summer.

Whilst capturing the band's live energy, Shadow has a much darker feel than King of the Waves, with more reverb and fuzz effects and influences of psychedelia, freakbeat and krautrock. Track 2 'Fuzzbomb' features Shawn Lee on backing vocals. The band also recorded a version of the song 'Only You' written by Danny Kirwan during his time with Fleetwood Mac. A limited edition 7" single of 'Fuzzbomb'/'Only You' was released as part of Record Store Day 2014. Shadow was released on 26 May 2014 and was followed by tours in the UK, Europe, Japan and the United States.

In January 2015, the band wrote and performed the main title theme music to the Breaking Bad spin-off Better Call Saul. The full-length version of the song was the opening track on the album Better Call Saul—Original Television Soundtrack: Season 1, released in November 2015. Season two of the series also featured "Why Don't You Do It" from "Stand Your Ground".

On 12 September 2017, Virgil Howe's unexpected death was announced by Yes, of which Virgil Howe's father Steve is a member.

Following the death of Howe, Little Barrie worked with Malcolm Catto and released the album Quatermass Seven in 2020, followed by Quatermass expansion in 2022. The musicians collaborated again on the album Electric War, released in 2025.

Little Barrie were interviewed by guitarist and YouTube personality Paul Davids in June 2025 in his video 'The Best Rhythm Guitar I’ve Heard In Ages' which has currently received 417K views.

On 26th February 2026 the remaining band members announced that they would be recording and performing under the name of Little Barrie again for the first time since 2017, and that there would be a new album Gravity Freeze released in the coming months. This coincided with the release of a track from the album, "More Bad Miles Of Road", on Bandcamp.

On 26 March 2026 Easy Eye Sound released the video for the track "It Isn't Soul" from the forthcoming Gravity Freeze album.

Gravity Freeze was released on 22 May 2026. A short tour of record shops in the UK at the end of June 2026 will be followed by an album tour in Autumn 2026 across the UK and mainland Europe.

== Other projects and associated acts ==
As well as performing with Morrissey in 2004 and Primal Scream from 2006-present, Barrie Cadogan has also played live with Edwyn Collins, Johnny Marr, Paul Weller, Pete Molinari, Damo Suzuki and Yeti Lane, BP Fallon and Saint Etienne. He has also performed on studio sessions with Primal Scream, Edwyn Collins, Anton Newcombe, Paul Weller, Spiritualized, Scott Asheton, Pete Molinari, Andrew Weatherall, Zook, The Chemical Brothers, Aspects, The Greg Foat Group, Bent, Paul Butler of The Bees, Patti Palladin, Brendan Lynch and The Proclaimers. In 2014, Cadogan also worked as a producer with artist Gil De Ray. Prior to the formation of Little Barrie, he played in Nottingham instrumental outfit Polska with Paul Isherwood, Adam Cann and Dorian Conway, who later formed The Soundcarriers. In May 2018, Barrie Cadogan was revealed as the guitarist for the 2018 comeback tour by The The. Cadogan also played guitar with Liam Gallagher in his 2022 tour, which included two shows at Knebworth House.

Virgil Howe was the son of guitarist Steve Howe and worked on a number of projects with him. Nexus, by Virgil and Steve Howe was released on 17 November 2017.

== Discography ==
=== Albums ===
Album information
We Are Little Barrie
- Released: 7 February 2005 (UK) 28 June 2005 (US)
- Produced by Edwyn Collins and Little Barrie
- Singles: "Burned Out", "Free Salute", "Long Hair", "Greener Pastures"
Stand Your Ground
- Released: 4 October 2006 (Japan) 29 January 2007 (UK/US) UK No. 192
- Produced by Dan the Automator and Mike Pelanconi
- Singles: "Pretty pictures", "Pin that badge", "Pay to Join", "Love you"
King of the Waves
- Released: 8 December 2010 (Japan) June 2011 (UK/US)
- Produced by Edwyn Collins and Little Barrie
- Singles: "Surf Hell", "How Come"
Shadow
- Released: 25 December 2013 (Japan) 26 May 2014 (UK/US)
- Produced by Edwyn Collins and Little Barrie
- Singles: "Fuzz Bomb", "Pauline", "Eyes Were Young"
Death Express
- Released: 7 July 2017
- Produced by Tom Forrest and Little Barrie
- Singles: "Produkt", "You Won't Stop Us"
As Little Barrie & Malcolm Catto
Quatermass Seven
- Released: 16 October 2020
- Produced by Little Barrie and Malcom Catto
Quatermass expansion
- Released: 26 February 2022
- Produced by Little Barrie and Malcom Catto
Electric War
- Released: 17 April 2025
- Produced by Little Barrie and Malcom Catto
- Singles: "Spektator", "Electric War", "Zero Sun"

=== Singles and EPs ===
Single information
"Shrug Off Love"
- Released: 3 August 2000
- Label: Stark Reality 005
- Songs included: "Shrug off Love", "Reply Me "
- Format: 7" vinyl
- More info: 1000 copy limited edition. Features Chris Lee on drums and Miles Newbold, of The Natural Yoghurt Band, on Hammond organ/percussion
"Don't Call it the Truth"
- Released: 4 June 2001
- Label: Stark Reality 010
- Songs included: "Don't Call it the Truth", "Give Me a Microphone"
- Produced by Little Barrie
- Engineered by Mike Burnham
- Recorded in the Tardis Studios
- Format: 7" vinyl
"Memories Well"
- Released: 26 November 2001
- Label: Stark Reality 015
- Songs included: "Memories Well", "Didn't Mean a Thing"
- Produced by Little Barrie
- Engineered by Mike Burnham
- Recorded in the Tardis Studios
- Format: 7" vinyl
"Burned Out"
- Released: 13 February 2002
- Label: Showdown
- Songs included: "Burned Out", "Buy My Style"
- Produced and engineered by Edwyn Collins and Sebastian Lewsky
- Keys played by Edwyn Collins
- Format: 7" vinyl
EP
- Released: 27 September 2004
- Label: Genuine Records 027
- Songs included: "Burned Out", "Be The One", "Thinking on the Mind", "Mud Sticks" (CD Only), "Thinking on the Mind" (Aspects Remix), "Memories Well", "Didn't Mean a Thing"
- Produced by Edwyn Collins, Aspects & Little Barrie
- Format: double 7" vinyl & CD
Free Salute
- Released: 22 January 2005
- Chart: UK No. 73
- Label: Genuine Records 032
- Songs included: "Free Salute", "Didn't Mean A Thing" (Vinyl Only), "Buy My Style" (CD Only), "Stones Throw" (instrumental) (CD Only)
- Produced and engineered by Edwyn Collins and Sebastian Lewsley except Didn't Mean A Thing engineered by Rupert Findt, assisted by Steve Bridges.
- Mastered by Chris Potter at Alchemy
- More info: Didn't Mean A Thing was recorded live at BBC Maida Vale Studios for Gilles Peterson Worldwide
- Format: double 7" vinyl & CD
"Long Hair"
- Released: 23 May 2005
- Chart: UK No. 97
- Label: Genuine Records 037
- Songs included: "Long Hair" (Radio Version), "Long Hair" (Stereo MC's 7" Edit) (CD Only), "Long Hair" (Extended Version) (Vinyl Only), "Once Upon A Lie" (Demo)
- Produced and engineered by Edwyn Collins and Sebastian Lewsley
- Format: 7" vinyl & CD
"Greener Pastures"
- Released: 29 September 2005
- Chart: UK No. 196
- Label: Genuine Records 039
- Songs included: "Greener Pastures" (Radio Edit), "Burned Out" (DJ Nu-Mark Remix), "Greener Pastures" (Live at the Ab Club, Belgium) (CD Only)
- Produced and engineered by Edwyn Collins and Sebastian Lewsley
- Remix and additional production on Burned out by Dj Nu-Mark
- Format: 7" vinyl & CD
Girls and Shoes
- Released: 12 July 2006
- Label: Genuine Records 044, Hostess Japan
- Songs included: "I Wonder Whether" (CD Only), "Girls And Shoes", "Pretty Pictures", "Why Don't You Do It" (demo) (CD Only)
- Produced by Mike Pelanconi
- Formats: 7" vinyl & CDS
Pin that Badge
- Released: 16 October 2006
- Label: Genuine Records
- Songs included: "Pin That Badge", "Green Eyed Fool", "Cash In", "Why Don't You Do It"
- Produced by Dan the Automator
- Format: 10" vinyl
Love You
- Released: 15 January 2007
- Label: Genuine Records 048
- Songs included: "Love You", "If I Don't Have To Answer" (CD Only), "I Wonder Whether" (Demo Version) (CD Only), "Yeah We Know You" (7" Only)
- Produced by Dan the Automator
- Formats: 7" vinyl & CDS
- More info: Billy Skinner, drums (Love You). Russell Simins, drums (If I Don't Have To Answer). Additional vocals on "If I Don't Have To Answer" 'Spiky' Phil Meynell and Golden Boy.
"Pay to Join"
- Released: 7 May 2007
- Label: Genuine Records 052
- Songs included: "Pay to Join", "Can of Worms"
- Produced by Dan the Automator
- Mixed by Mike Pelanconi
- Formats: 7" vinyl & CDS
- More info: Drums by Russell Simins
"Surf Hell"
- Released: 5 April 2011
- Label:Non Deluxe
- Songs included: "Surf Hell", "King of the Waves"
- Produced by: Edwyn Collins
- Formats: 7" Vinyl and CD
"How Come"
- Released: 2011
- Label:Non Deluxe
- Songs Included: "How Come", "Precious Pressure"
- Produced by: Edwyn Collins
- Formats: 7" Vinyl
"Fuzz Bomb"
- Released: May 2014
- Label: Tummy Touch
- Songs Included: "Fuzz Bomb", "Only You" (D. Kirwan)
- Produced by: Edwyn Collins, Little Barrie
- Formats: Limited 7" Vinyl
"I.5.C.A."
- Released: June 2016
- Label: Non Deluxe
- Songs Included: "I.5.C.A.", "Shoulders Up, Eyes Down"
- Produced by: Little Barrie
- Formats: Limited 7" Vinyl, Download
