= Hellbent on Compromise =

Studio album by Edwyn Collins
- Released: January 1990
- Studio: Power Plant Studios, London
- Genre: Rock
- Length: 50:44
- Label: Diablo
- Producer: Edwyn Collins, Dave Anderson

Edwyn Collins chronology
Hope and Despair (1989)	Hellbent on Compromise (1990)	Gorgeous George (1994)

Professional ratings
Review scores
Source	Rating
AllMusic	3.5/5 stars
The Encyclopedia of Popular Music	3/5 stars

Hellbent on Compromise is an album by Scottish musician Edwyn Collins, released in 1990.

== Critical reception ==
The Rough Guide to Rock wrote that the album "lacked its predecessor's tight, dense production, and its atmospherics too often gave way to an unsatisfactory sparseness."

== Track listing ==
All tracks composed by Edwyn Collins; except where indicated

1. "Means to an End" (Collins, Paul Quinn) - 5:12
2. "You Poor Deluded Fool" - 4:54
3. "It Might as Well Be You" - 3:25
4. "Take Care of Yourself" - 6:43
5. "Graciously" - 3:44
6. "Someone Else Besides" - 4:35
7. "My Girl Has Gone" (Marv Tarplin, Ronald White, William Robinson, Warren "Pete" Moore) - 3:44
8. "Now That It's Love" - 3:27
9. "Everything and More" - 4:58
10. "What's the Big Idea?" - 4:57
11. "Time of the Preacher/Long Time Gone" (Collins/Willie Nelson) - 5:05

== Personnel ==
- Edwyn Collins – guitar, vocals
- John "Segs" Jennings – bass
- Chris Taylor – drums, percussion
- David Anderson – keyboards, guitar
- Colin MacKenzie – bass
- Trevor McCarty – bass
- Chucho Merchán – double bass
- Martin Drover – trumpet
- Zop Cormorant - drums
- Jock Loveband - backing vocals on "What's the Big Idea?"
- Tyrone Berkeley - backing vocals on "Time of the Preacher/Long Time Gone"
- Simeon Jones - harmonica on "Time of the Preacher/Long Time Gone"
- David Robinson - cello on "Time of the Preacher/Long Time Gone"
- Alan Titherington, Kirsten Morrison - violin on "Time of the Preacher/Long Time Gone"
