= Gorgeous George (album) =

1994 studio album by Edwyn Collins

Studio album by Edwyn Collins
- Released: 1 July 1994
- Recorded: November 1993−April 1994
- Studios: New River, London
- Genres: Alternative rock; Britpop; glam rock; jangle pop; folk rock; blue-eyed soul
- Length: 58:15
- Label: Setanta
- Producer: Edwyn Collins

Edwyn Collins chronology
Hellbent on Compromise (1990)	Gorgeous George (1994)	I'm Not Following You (1997)

Singles from Rip It Up
- 1. "A Girl Like You" Released: 5 December 1994; 2. "Low Expectations" Released: 1995 (Belgium); 3. "If You Could Love Me" Released: 1995; 4. "Make Me Feel Again" Released: 1995

Professional ratings
Review scores
Source	Rating
AllMusic	4.5/5 stars
Chicago Tribune	3.5/4 stars
MusicHound Rock: The Essential Album Guide	4/5 stars
NME	7/10
Rolling Stone	3/5 stars
Select	2/5 medals

Gorgeous George is the third solo studio album by Scottish musician Edwyn Collins. The album was recorded at New River in London, with Collins acting as the producer. It was released on 1 July 1994 and features guest musician Paul Cook of the Sex Pistols.

== Background ==
Over a decade, Edwyn Collins had found a cult following as the lead singer and guitarist of post-punk band Orange Juice and on his debut solo studio album, Hope and Despair (1989). However, he had little mainstream success apart from the top 10 single, "Rip It Up," and his second solo studio album, Hellbent on Compromise (1990), failed to impress even indie audiences. Collins parted ways with his label, Demon, and took a break from music.

== Composition ==
Gorgeous George has been described as alternative rock, Britpop, glam rock, jangle pop, folk rock and blue-eyed soul. Anna Glen, in the book MusicHound Rock, noted that that this album "…is Collins at his best–cynical, honest, ironic, and funny."

== Track listing ==
1. "The Campaign for Real Rock" – 6:35
2. "A Girl Like You" – 3:58
3. "Low Expectations" – 3:58
4. "Out of This World" – 5:37
5. "If You Could Love Me" – 5:30
6. "North of Heaven" – 3:39
7. "Gorgeous George" – 4:08
8. "It's Right in Front of You" – 6:26
9. "Make Me Feel Again" – 4:22
10. "I've Got It Bad" – 4:40
11. "Subsidence" – 5:44
12. "Moron" – 3:26

== Personnel ==
Personnel per booklet.

Main musicians

- Edwyn Collins – vocals, guitar, keyboards; bass and drums on track 10
- Paul Cook – drums, percussion
- Clare Kenny – bass guitar

Additional musicians

- Vic Godard – backing vocals on tracks 1–2
- Sean Read – backing vocals on tracks 1–2, 4, 6–8 and 11
- Dennis Bovell – bass on track 5
- Martin Drover – flugelhorn on track 5
- Patrick Arbuthnot – pedal steel on track 6
- Sebastian Lewsley – ARP synthesizer on tracks 8 and 11

Production

- Edwyn Collins – producer, arranger, engineer
- Sebastian Lewsley – engineer
- Duncan Cowell – mastering
- Gavin Evans – photography
- Rob Crane – sleeve art

== Charts ==
Chart performance for Gorgeous George
Chart (1994–1995)	Peak position
Australian Albums (ARIA)	37
Austrian Albums (Ö3 Austria)	24
Canada Top Albums/CDs (RPM)	60
Dutch Albums (Album Top 100)	58
German Albums (Offizielle Top 100)	7
Scottish Albums (Official Charts)	18
Swedish Albums (Sverigetopplistan)	16
Swiss Albums (Schweizer Hitparade)	35
UK Albums (Official Charts)	8
US Billboard 200	183
