= Hope and Despair =

Studio album by Edwyn Collins
- Released: 1989
- Recorded: February–April 1989
- Studio: Whitehouse, Köln; "Swamp" Priory Road, London
- Genre: Country rock
- Length: 55:35
- Label: Demon
- Producer: Phil Thornalley, Tom Dokoupil

Edwyn Collins chronology
Hope and Despair (1989)	Hellbent on Compromise (1990)

Singles from Hope and Despair
- 1. "Coffee Table Song" Released: 1989; 2. "50 Shades of Blue" Released: 1989

Professional ratings
Review scores
Source	Rating
AllMusic	3.5/5 stars

Hope and Despair is the debut solo album by Scottish musician Edwyn Collins. It was released in 1989.

== Track listing ==
All tracks composed by Edwyn Collins; except where indicated

1. "Coffee Table Song" – 4:51
2. "50 Shades of Blue" – 3:55
3. "You're Better Than You Know" – 4:12
4. "Pushing It to the Back of My Mind" – 3:47
5. "If Ever You're Ready" – 4:21
6. "Darling, They Want It All" – 3:42
7. "The Wheels of Love" – 4:54
8. "The Beginning of the End" – 3:57
9. "The Measure of a Man" (Dennis Bovell) – 3:38
10. "Testing Time" – 3:51
11. "Let Me Put My Arms Around You" – 4:06
12. "The Wide Eyed Child in Me" – 2:51
13. "Ghost of a Chance" – 4:08
14. "Hope and Despair" – 3:22

== Personnel ==
- Edwyn Collins – guitar, vocals, backing vocals
- Dennis Bovell – bass
- David Ruffy – drums
- Bernie Clarke – Hammond organ, piano, synthesizer, Wurlitzer
- Roddy Frame- guitar, backing vocals
- Steven Skinner - guitar
- Bruce Dern - steel guitar on "Pushing It to the Back of My Mind" and "The Wide Eyed Child in Me"
- Alex Grey - Hammond organ on "50 Shades of Blue"
- Tom Dokoupil - synthesizer on "Pushing It to the Back of My Mind"; string arrangement on "You're Better Than You Know"
