= Barrie Cadogan =

English guitarist

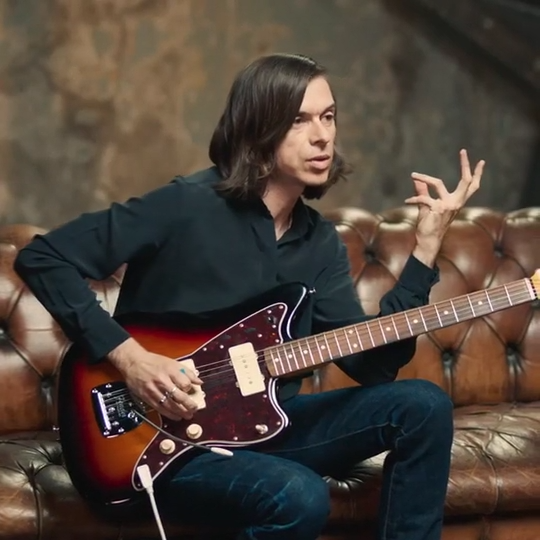
- Cadogan in 2021

Background information
- Also known as: Little Barrie
- Born: January 1975 (age 51)
- Genres: Alternative rock; indie rock; post-punk; R&B; soul; funk
- Occupations: Musician; singer; songwriter
- Instruments: Guitar; vocals; bass; keyboards
- Years active: 1999–present
- Member of: Little Barrie; The The; The Black Keys (Touring)
- Formerly of: Morrissey; Primal Scream; Paul Weller; Liam Gallagher; Liam Gallagher & John Squire
- Website: littlebarrie.com

Barrie Cadogan (born January 1975) is an English guitarist, known for his association with Morrissey, Paul Weller, Edwyn Collins, Primal Scream, Liam Gallagher, John Squire, The The, and The Black Keys, and also for being the founder of Little Barrie. He also played guitar on the intro to the TV series Better Call Saul.

== Career ==
Cadogan started Little Barrie in 2000 together with Wayne Fulwood on drums and Lewis Wharton on bass. The trio released their debut album We Are Little Barrie in 2005. The album featured guest appearances from Edwyn Collins. Before the release of the album he played with Morrissey on his 2004 tour, replacing Alain Whyte after being recommended by his friend and fellow guitarist Boz Boorer.

In 2006, Cadogan started performing live with Primal Scream as co-guitarist following the departure of founding member Robert Young. He played on their albums Beautiful Future (2008) and More Light (2013) as a session musician. In 2015 he stopped performing with the band.

In 2016, he launched a new solo project Cobra Lamps, releasing their first album on 1 July that year.

In 2018, he joined post-punk band The The as lead guitarist, a role previously held by the likes of Johnny Marr, who had recommended him to band leader Matt Johnson.

Cadogan has continued to perform with Little Barrie, who were reduced to a duo following the death of long-time drummer Virgil Howe, son of Yes guitarist Steve Howe.

He has also acted as a sideman for the Chemical Brothers, Paulo Nutini and Paul Weller among others.

In 2022, he joined Liam Gallagher's solo band as a touring replacement for Paul 'Bonehead' Arthurs who was undergoing treatment for tonsil cancer. His stint with Gallagher meant that he played alongside John Squire of the Stone Roses. He played again with the two musicians on their UK tour as a duo, this time playing bass, alongside Joey Waronker on drums.

== Gallery ==
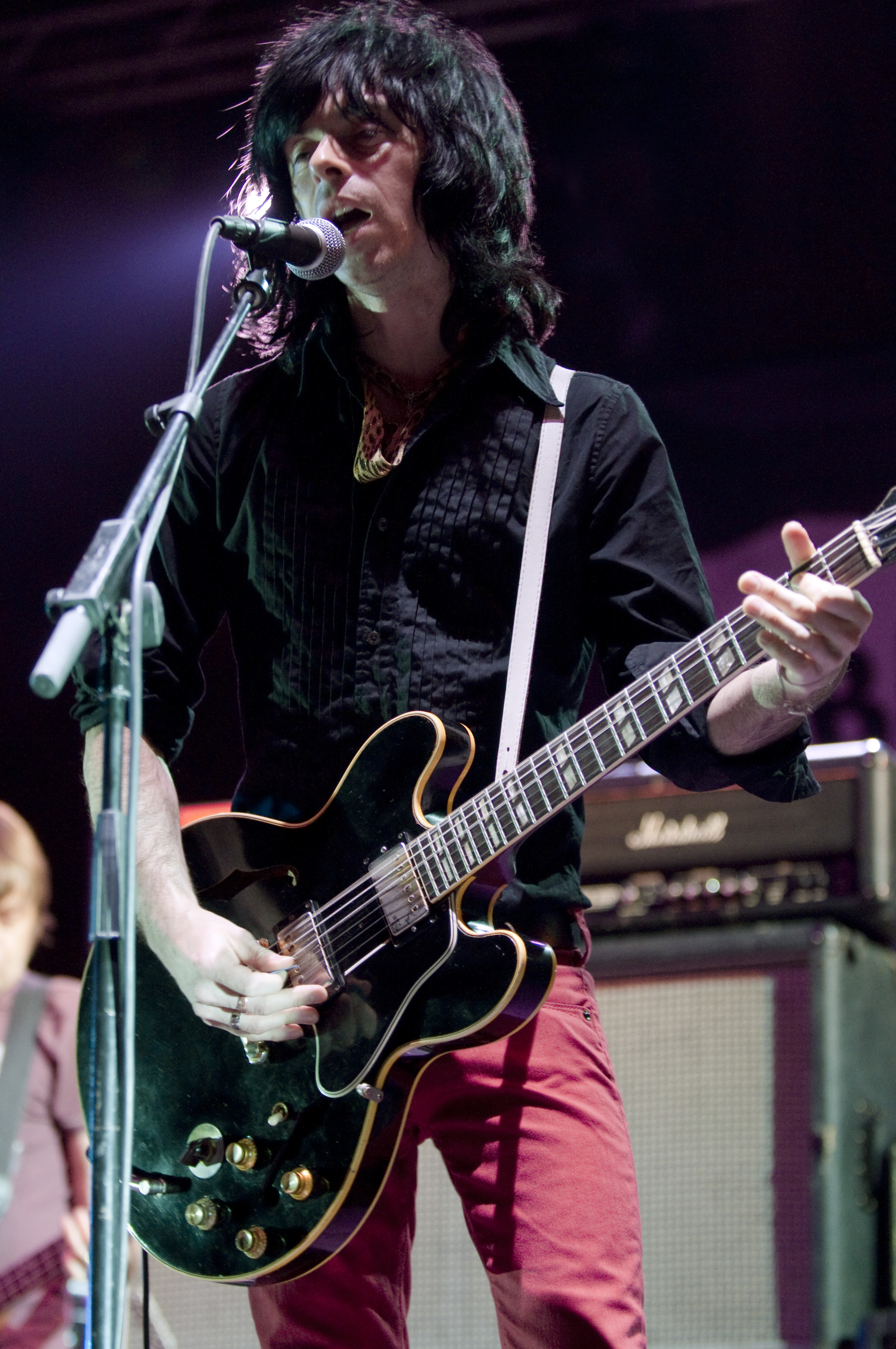
Cadogan with Primal Scream in 2009

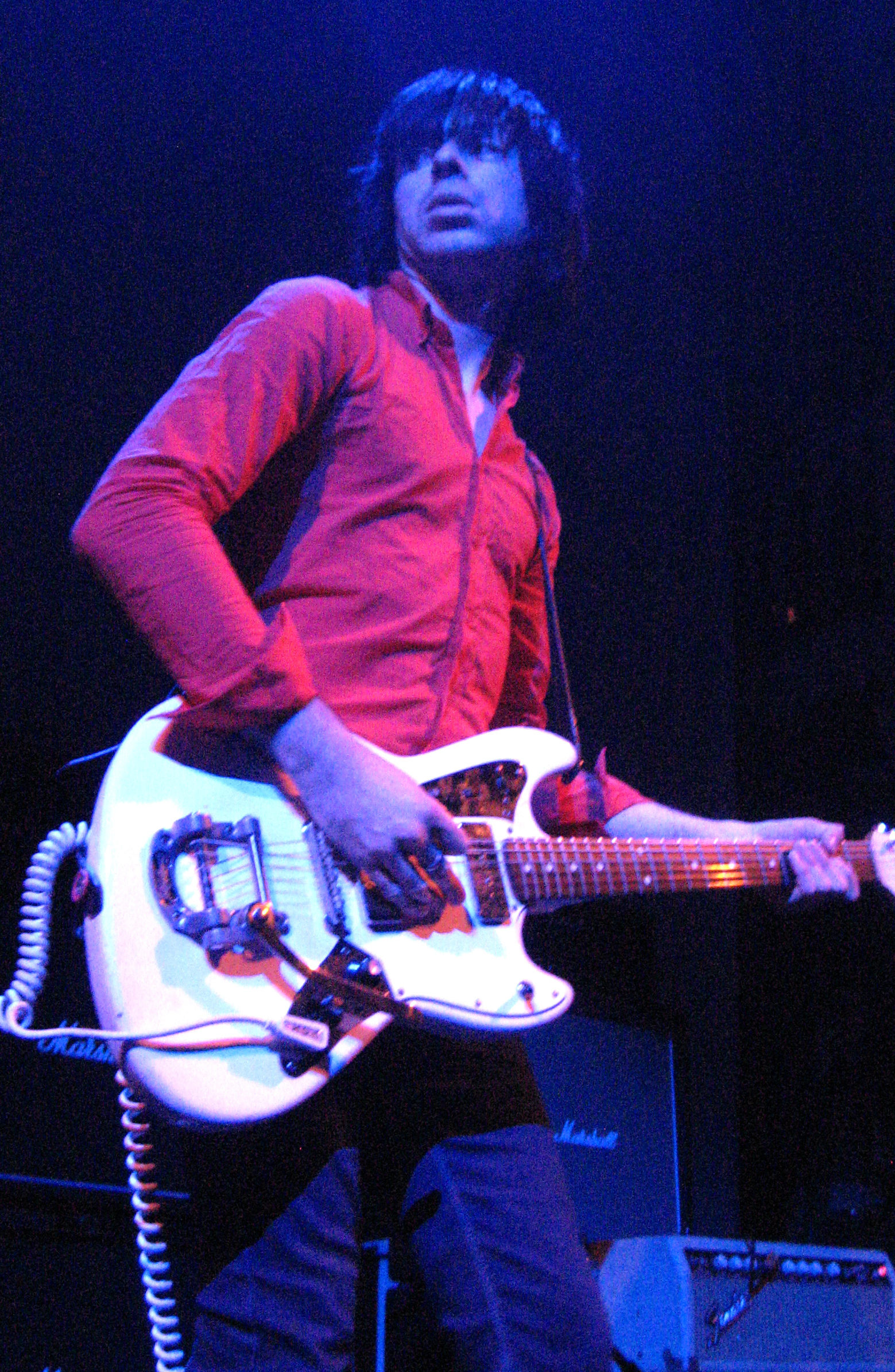
Cadogan with Little Barrie in 2011

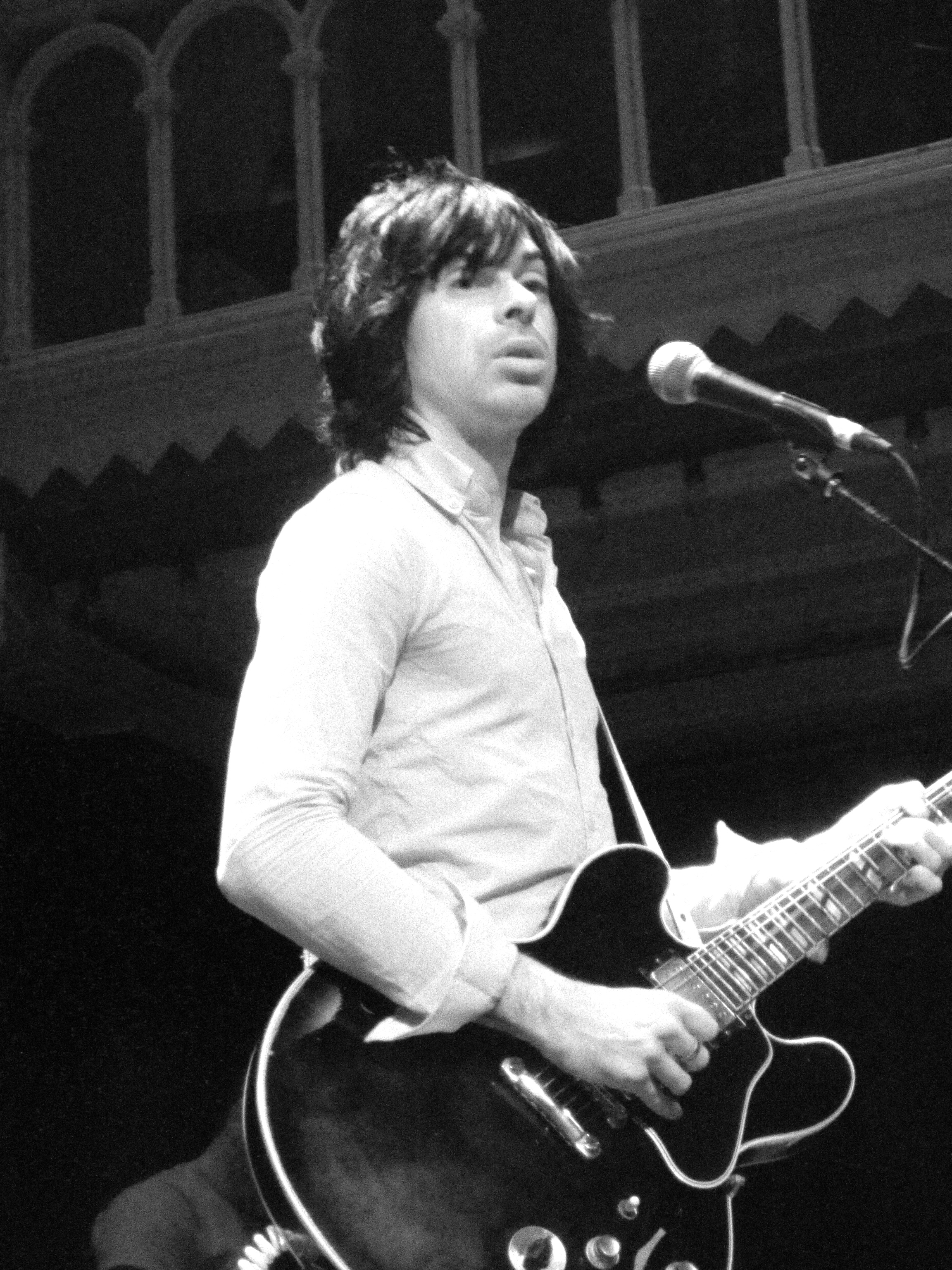
Cadogan with Little Barrie in 2011

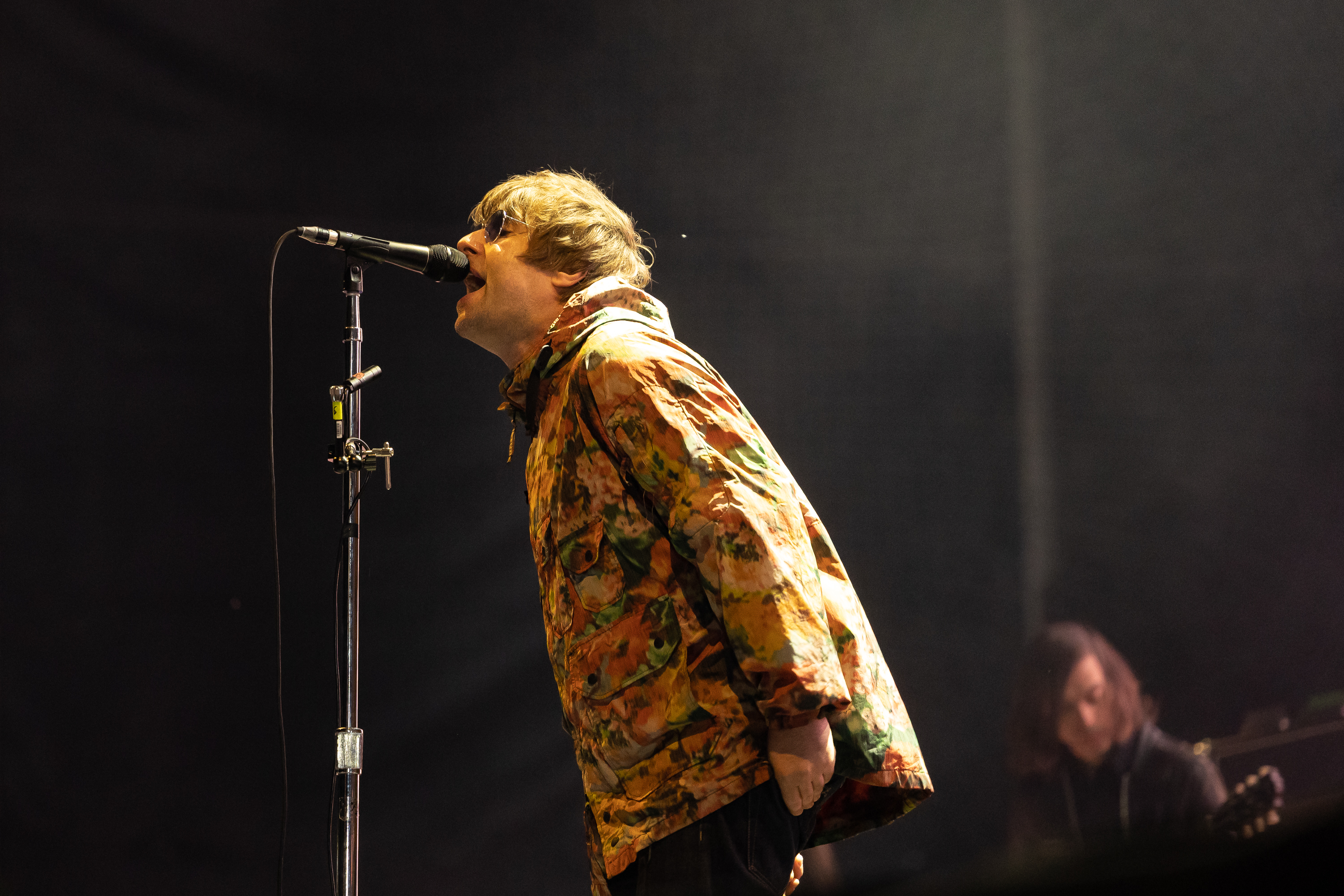
Cadogan (back right) with Liam Gallagher in 2022

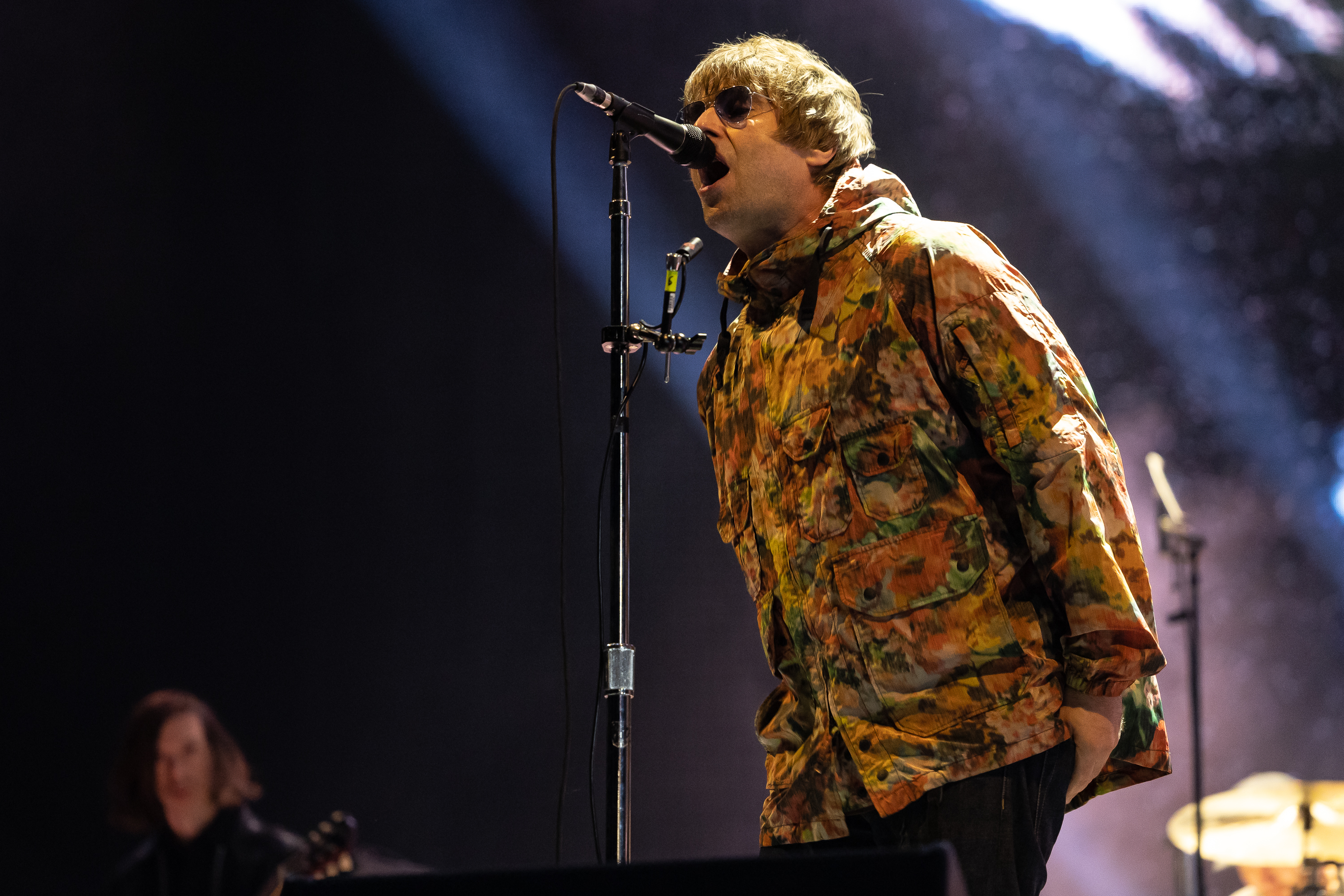
Cadogan (back left) with Liam Gallagher in 2022

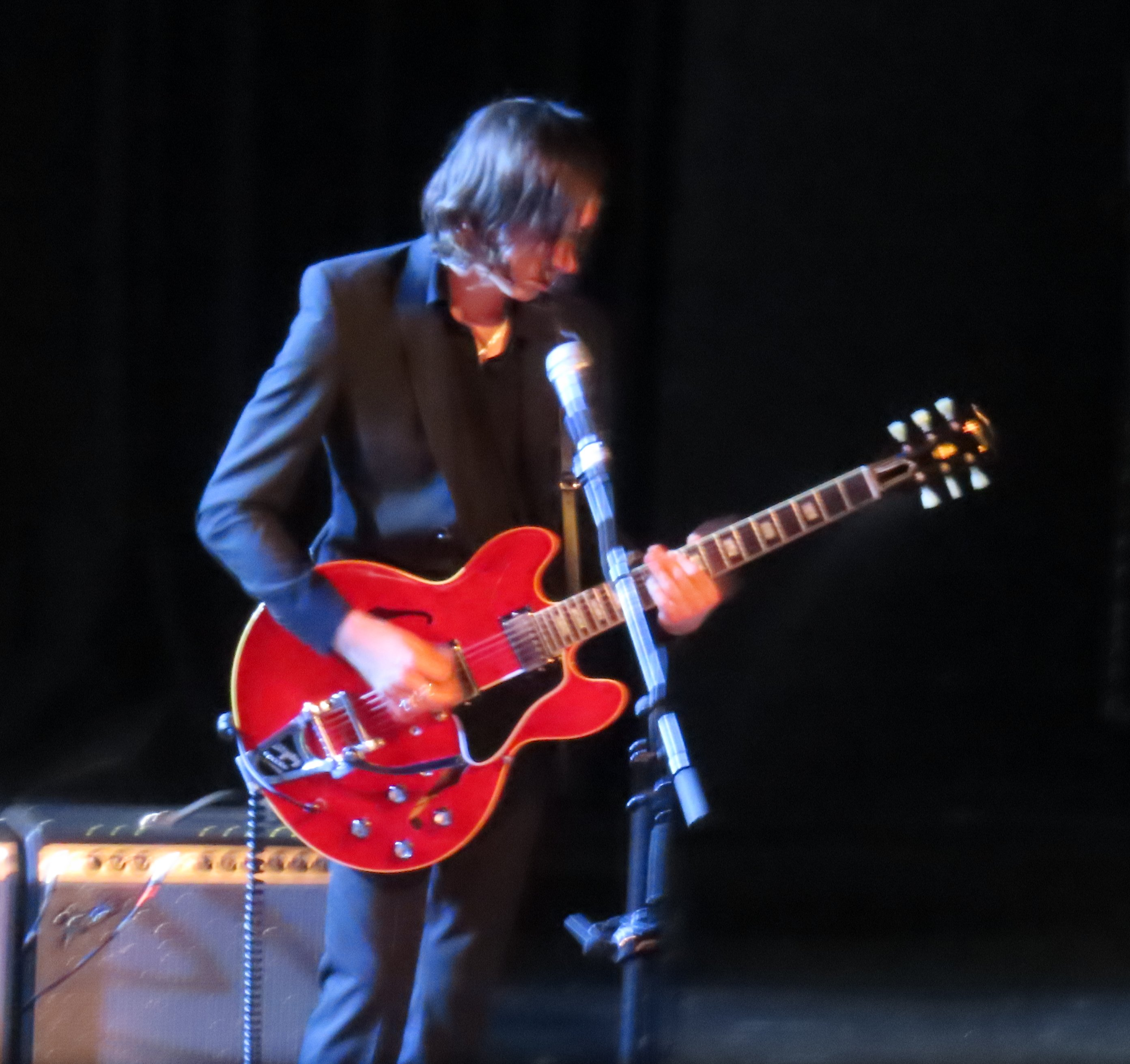
Cadogan with The The in 2024

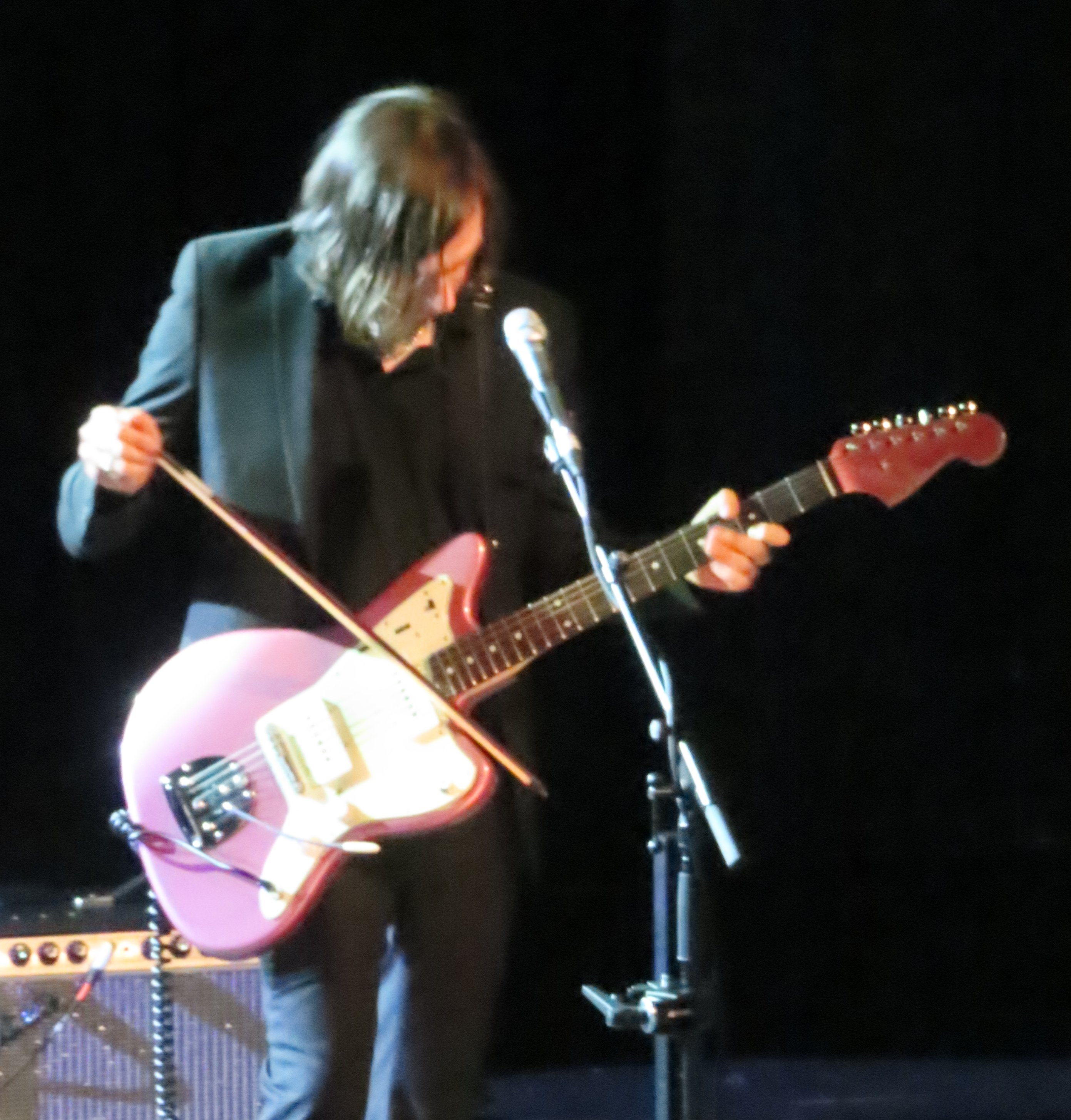
Cadogan with The The in 2024
