= Edwyn Collins =

Scottish musician (born 1959)

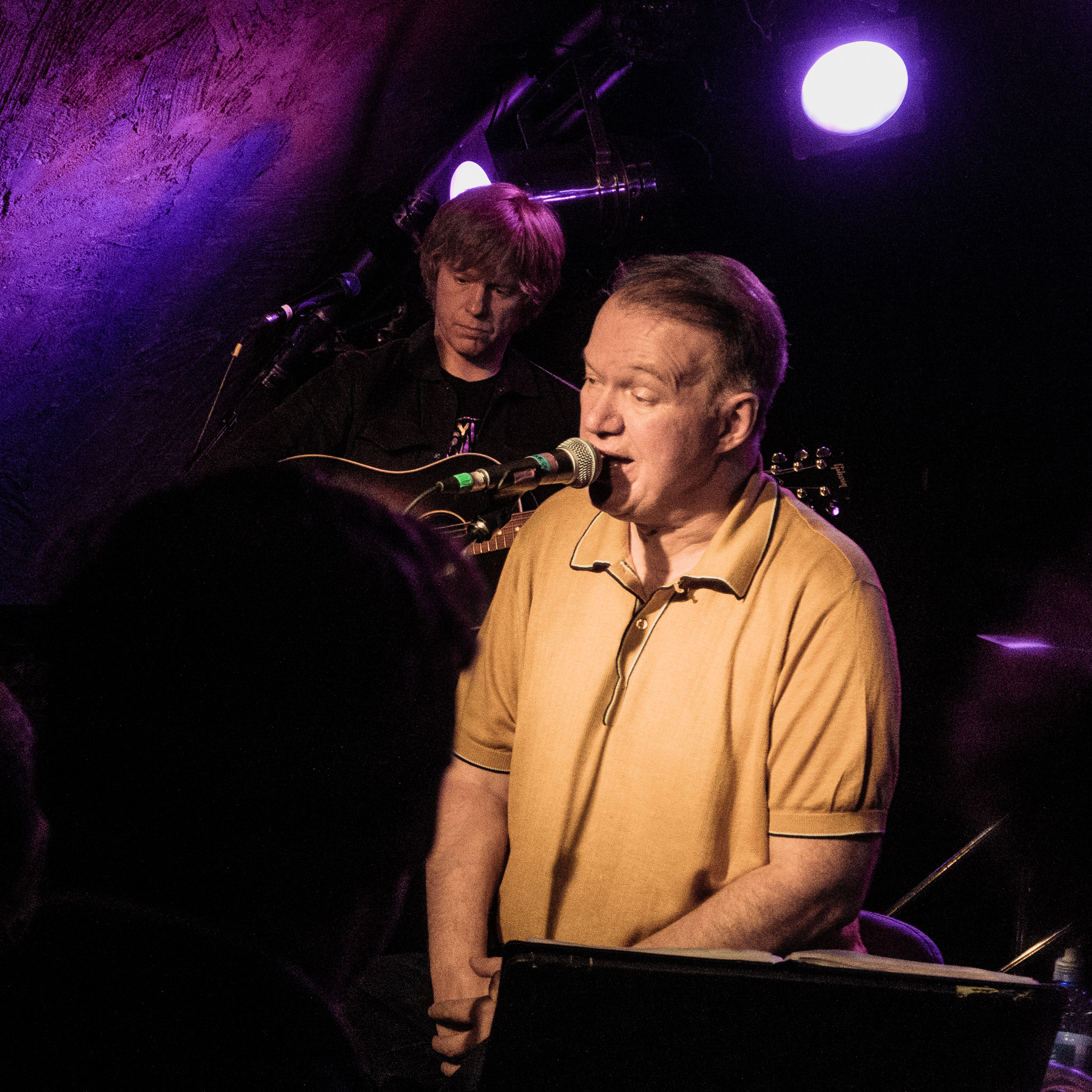
- Collins in 2019

Background information
- Born: Edwyn Stephen Collins; 23 August 1959 (age 67); Edinburgh, Scotland
- Origin: Dundee, Scotland
- Genres: Alternative rock; post-punk; new wave; indie pop
- Occupations: Singer-songwriter; musician; record label owner
- Instruments: Vocals; guitar; bass; violin; synthesizer; sampling; drums; harmonica
- Years active: 1976–2005; 2007–present
- Labels: Setanta; Epic; Heavenly; AED (Analogue Enhanced Digital)
- Formerly of: Nu-Sonics; Orange Juice; The Drums; Aztec Camera; The Cribs; Roddy Frame
- Website: edwyncollins.com

Edwyn Stephen Collins (born 23 August 1959) is a Scottish musician, producer and record label owner. Collins was the lead singer for the 1980s post-punk band Orange Juice, which he co-founded. After the group split in 1985, Collins started a solo career. His 1994 single "A Girl Like You" was a worldwide hit.

In February 2005, Collins was hospitalised after two cerebral haemorrhages which resulted in aphasia, and he needed months to recover. He resumed his musical career in 2007. A documentary film on his recovery, The Possibilities Are Endless, was released in 2014.

Collins was the co-founder of the indie record label Postcard Records and co-founded a second label, Analogue Enhanced Digital, in 2011. Collins has also worked as an illustrator, television actor, television producer and record producer. He won an Ivor Novello Award, the Ivor Inspiration Award, in 2009.

== Early life ==
Edwyn Stephen Collins was born on 23 August 1959 in Edinburgh. He lived in Dundee from the age of six to 14 after his father got a job as a lecturer at Duncan of Jordanstone College of Art and Design. He attended the now-defunct Demonstration School in Park Place, where new educational ideas were tried out by pupils and teachers from the adjacent teacher training college, before moving to the secondary school, Morgan Academy.

== Career ==
=== Orange Juice ===
Collins co-founded the band the Nu-Sonics in 1976; The band changed its name to Orange Juice in 1979. Collins and his friend Alan Horne founded the record label Postcard Records that year to release the band's singles. The band's debut single, "Falling and Laughing" was issued in February 1980. Although critically acclaimed, the single only sold 2,000 copies.

After three more singles with Postcard, Orange Juice signed to Polydor Records in October 1981 and released their debut album, You Can't Hide Your Love Forever in March 1982. The band's second album, Rip It Up followed in November 1982. Their single "Rip It Up", released in early 1983, reached number 8 on the UK Singles Chart and was noted as the first British hit single to feature a bass-line from the Roland TB-303 synthesizer. The song was their only Top 40 single.

The band's two subsequent albums, Texas Fever and The Orange Juice, were both released in 1984. They failed to find the same success as Rip It Up.

Orange Juice disbanded in January 1985, after Polydor grew dissatisfied with the band's lack of success and the band's difficulty finding a new label to sign with. During this time in his career, Collins met Grace Maxwell, whom he hired as his manager and later married.

Collins started his solo career in 1986, and signed to Elevation Records, a label that was a co-venture between indie label Creation Records and major label Warner Music.

=== Solo career to 2005 ===
Collins released two singles for the Elevation label in 1987, both produced by Robin Guthrie of the Cocteau Twins, but both failed to enter the UK Singles Chart. Elevation was closed in November 1987, just ten months after it released its first single. After the closure, Collins experienced a "falling out" with Creation Records founder Alan McGee, who had financed Elevation. As a result, unlike other Elevation signees such as Primal Scream and The Weather Prophets, Collins was not migrated to the main Creation label and he was left without a record label contract.

At the request of passionate Orange Juice fans in Germany, Collins recorded his next album at a small German studio, with the aid of producer Dennis Bovell, who had worked with Collins in Orange Juice, and Roddy Frame of Aztec Camera. The album, Hope and Despair, was released in 1989 by the Demon label and achieved success as an independent release. Demon also released Collins's next record, Hellbent on Compromise (1990), which was not as successful as its predecessor. Demon and Collins then parted ways and Collins embarked on a lengthy hiatus.

Collins built his own recording studio in 1994 that was used to record his third solo album, Gorgeous George, which he also produced. The studio, located in West Hampstead, London, would become the West Heath Yard Studios that Collins would use for his future record label, AED Records.

In 1994, Collins released the single "A Girl Like You", which was a worldwide hit the following year. It became his only US hit, reaching number 32, after it was featured in the film Empire Records. It was subsequently used in the movie Charlie's Angels: Full Throttle in 2003.

Collins released his followup to Gorgeous George, I'm Not Following You, in 1997. One of its singles, "The Magic Piper (of Love)", was featured on the soundtrack for Austin Powers: International Man of Mystery that year

=== Cerebral haemorrhage ===
In a BBC 6 Music radio interview on 18 February 2005, Collins said he felt unwell, but ascribed the nausea and vertigo to food poisoning. Two days later, he was admitted to intensive care in London's Royal Free Hospital after apparently suffering a major cerebral haemorrhage. After suffering a second haemorrhage he had an operation on 25 February 2005, which was followed by a lengthy programme of neurological rehabilitation owing to right-sided weakness and difficulty with speech. His aphasia left him able to repeat only four phrases: "yes", "no", "Grace Maxwell" (his wife's name) and "the possibilities are endless".

=== Post-cerebral haemorrhage ===
Collins released his sixth solo album, entitled Home Again, in September 2007 on Heavenly Records. The album was recorded before his illness but mixed after his discharge from hospital. While still recovering, Collins returned to singing live, including playing a gig at The Arts Theatre in London. A tribute song celebrating his return was recorded by the indie pop band The Candy Twins.

A BBC Scotland documentary, Edwyn Collins: Home Again, narrated by Franz Ferdinand frontman Alex Kapranos, was broadcast on 19 May 2008. Filmed during 2007, it follows Collins's progress in recovering from his illness and his first return to live performance at the BBC Electric Proms. Collins then performed at the Glastonbury Festival, which was broadcast on 28 June 2008 on BBC Two, and at T in the Park on 10 July 2009 (Collins's first ever T in the Park).

On 2 October 2009, Collins's wife and manager Grace Maxwell detailed her "running battle" with Warner Music Group and MySpace over his right to allow fans to listen to "A Girl Like You" for free on his MySpace page.

In November 2009, at a gig in London's Bloomsbury Ballroom, following a tour of the Scottish Highlands, Collins's singing was contrasted with his slow speech: "[W]hen he started to sing, his baritone proved as powerful as ever." On 20 February 2010, he joined The Maccabees onstage at Brixton Academy for their encore, performing vocals on a rendition of "Rip It Up".

Losing Sleep, Collins's first written and recorded album since his 2005 illness, was then released on 13 September 2010 in the UK. The album was recorded at his own West Heath Studios between November 2008 and May 2010, and was produced by Collins and Sebastian Lewsley. Collins and Lewsley first met in 1992, while Collins was producing former Subway Sect frontman Vic Godard's album The End of the Surrey People and Lewsley was his assistant. For the album, he collaborated with The Cribs' Ryan Jarman and Johnny Marr, Franz Ferdinand, The Magic Numbers singer Romeo Stodart, the Drums and Roddy Frame. Lewsley explained the recording process of Losing Sleep in 2010:

We did each song in a day ... and a day consists of about four hours. So there's a real expediency about how it's recorded. The whole attitude of the album is just doing that. Not indulging anyone. Not having any band sitting round for days and days. "Have you got a guitar part yet? No? Just do it. You've got a coupla hours." They [Collins's collaborators] all looked quite petrified but they did it.

In 2009, during the making of Losing Sleep, Lewsley observed Collins gradually regain his musical proficiency—Lewsley explained: "The studio is more of an instrument again for Edwyn." The cover art for the album features a collection of bird drawings that Collins started working on in 2005.

On 30 September 2010, Collins and his band broadcast three live songs from the Royal Beacon Hotel in Exmouth for BBC Radio 2's "Radcliffe and Maconie Show". (Stuart Maconie is a former music journalist and his first NME article was a review of Collins's 1987 gig at the Manchester International.)

On 30 July 2011, Collins performed at the Indietracks festival that was held at the Midland Railway, Butterley. During the 2012 Kendal Calling event Collins sang "A Girl Like You", with Roddy Frame on guitar and Tim Burgess on backing vocals.

Collins's eighth solo album, Understated, was released in March 2013 on his own AED Records label and was critically well received, with God Is in the TV stating:

Understated is more than just another step to recovery, it is indeed a fine record in its own right, and utterly life-affirming. It's also perhaps the ultimate testament to the healing power of music. He lost the ability to read, write, and lost movement in half of his body, but what he didn't lose was his gift for coming up with an ear-catching tune, as is proved here. It will make you smile, it may even make you cry, and it's an album that reminds you how good it is to be alive.

A documentary film about Collins entitled The Possibilities Are Endless, directed by James Hall and Edward Lovelace, was released in November 2014.

== Collaborations with Roddy Frame ==
Collins has been friends with Roddy Frame, the frontman for the new wave group Aztec Camera, since they were both signed to Postcard Records in the 1980s. Collins and Frame collaborated on the Aztec Camera album Stray, including a live performance of the song "Consolation Prize".

Frame performed with Collins in November 2007 during Collins's first concert after his recovery from a serious illness, and the pair played again at the Glastonbury Festival in June 2008, on the Park Stage, and at the Purcell Rooms in London, UK, in September 2008.

Frame's fourth solo album, Seven Dials, was released in 2014 on Collins's AED record label. Frame explained, following the album's release, that he had been inspired to make an album with a full band after his positive experience playing with Collins in 2007 and 2008.

== Production work ==
Collins has also worked extensively as a record producer with other artists, including Terrorvision, Robert Forster, The Cribs, Little Barrie, Hooton Tennis Club and Vic Godard.

In 1999, Collins was invited by the band Space to produce what would have been their third album Love You More than Football, which ended up being scrapped. However he is credited as a producer on a few B-sides, and he delivers a brief vocal cameo on the song "Thank You", where he makes reference to "Falling and Laughing".

In 2005 Collins produced the Cribs album The New Fellas and co-produced the 2013 album Clarietta, by Charlie Boyer and the Voyeurs, with Lewsley. He also co-produced The Rails' debut album Fair Warning, released on Island Records in 2014.

Collins also produced The Official Body, the third album by the British post-punk band Shopping, which was released on 19 January 2018.

Collins co-produced a collaborative project between Camera Obscura frontwoman Tracyanne Campbell and guitarist Danny Coughlan that was released in May 2018 by Merge Records with the title Tracyanne & Danny.

== Other projects ==
In addition to his music career Collins also produced and starred in the Channel 4 television show West Heath Yard. Collins released his first book of illustrations, Some British Birds, with Morel Books in 2009. Liberty of London printed his bird illustrations on fabric as part of a series of fabrics created in collaboration with musicians; his print is named Ornithology.

== Awards and honours ==
In May 2009 Collins won the Ivors Inspiration Award in recognition of his struggles following his 2005 brain haemorrhage.

- 1995: Goldene Europa for Best International Singer
- 1996: Ivor Novello Award for Most Performed Work & Best Contemporary Song ("A Girl Like You") (nominated)
- 1996: RSH Gold Awards for Airplay Hit of the Year ("A Girl Like You")
- 2008: UK Festival Award for Festival Feel-Good Act & Most Memorable Moment (nominated)
- 2014, Scottish Album of the Year Award for Understated (nominated)
- 2019, Scottish Album of the Year Award (Longlisted) for Badbea (nominated)

In 2010, he received an honorary master's degree from the Buckinghamshire New University, in recognition of his "strong influences and contribution to the national and international music industry over the last three decades".

On 21 August 2010, Collins attended the Helmsdale Highland Games as the chieftain, an honour also previously bestowed on his grandfather.

On 24 August 2022, Collins appeared on stage with Coldplay at Hampden Park, Glasgow, to perform "A Girl Like You."

== Personal life ==
Collins is married to Grace Maxwell, who is also his manager. The couple live in Helmsdale.

== Discography ==
- Hope and Despair (1989)
- Hellbent on Compromise (1990)
- Gorgeous George (1994)
- I'm Not Following You (1997)
- Doctor Syntax (2002)
- Home Again (2007)
- Losing Sleep (2010)
- Understated (2013)
- Badbea (2019)
- Nation Shall Speak Unto Nation (2025)

== See also ==
- List of Scottish musicians
- List of 1990s one-hit wonders in the United States
- List of number-one singles in Australia during the 1990s
