= Heaven 17 discography =

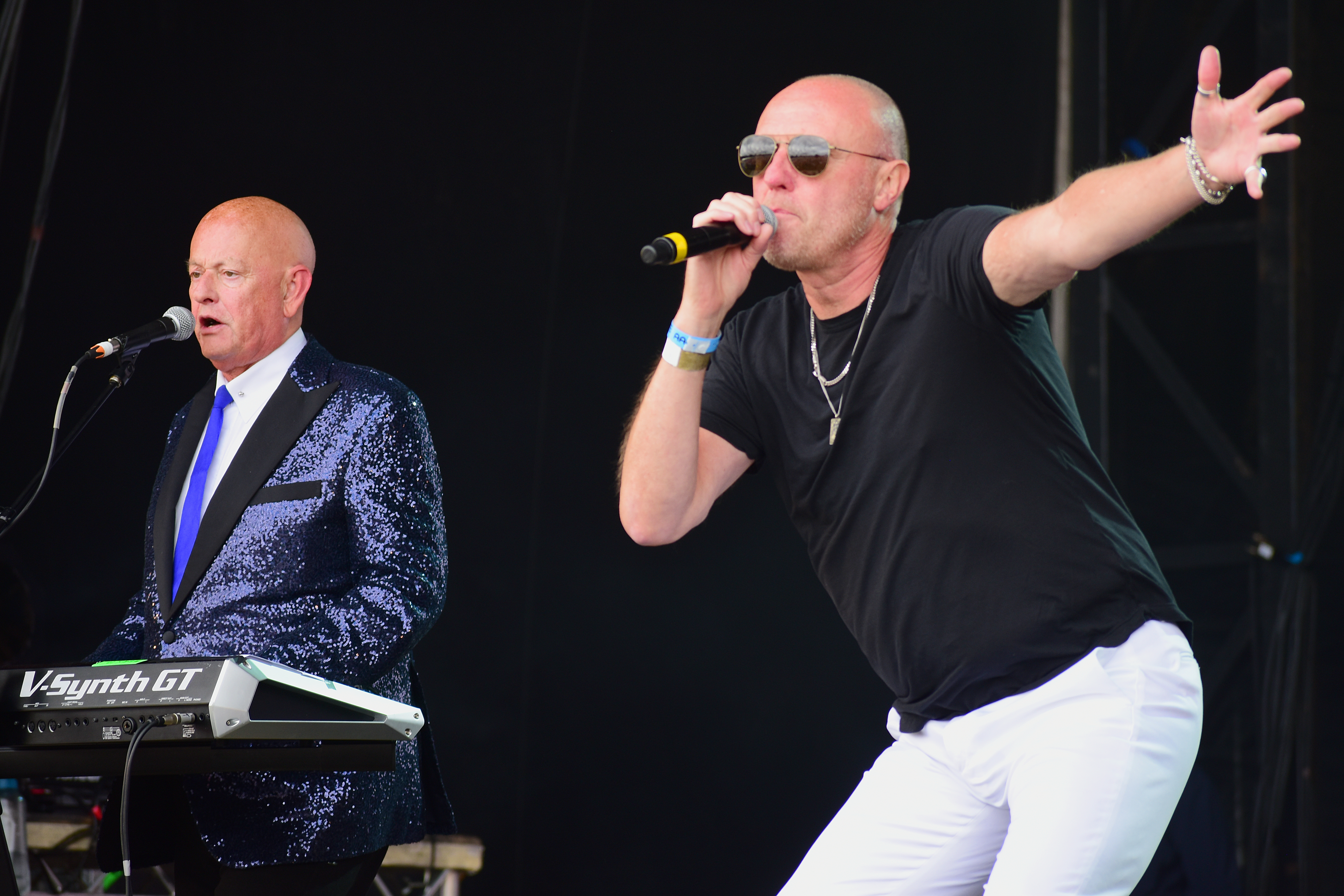
- Heaven 17 performing live in Liverpool, 2021; Left to right: Martyn Ware (keyboards), Glenn Gregory (vocals)
- Studio albums: 8
- EPs: 3
- Live albums: 4
- Compilation albums: 12
- Singles: 30
- Video albums: 4
- Music videos: 14
- Box sets: 3
- Remix albums: 2

This is the discography of the English synth-pop band Heaven 17.

== Albums ==
=== Studio albums ===
| Year | Title | Details | Peak chart positions | | | | | | | | | Certifications (sales thresholds) |
| Year | Title | Details | UK | AUS | FIN | FRA | GER | NL | NZ | SWE | US | Certifications (sales thresholds) |
|---|---|---|---|---|---|---|---|---|---|---|---|---|
| 1981 | Penthouse and Pavement | Released: 18 September 1981; Label: Virgin | 14 | 99 | 18 | — | — | — | 45 | 24 | — | UK: Gold |
| 1983 | The Luxury Gap | Released: 25 April 1983; Label: Virgin | 4 | 53 | 13 | 18 | 7 | 20 | 11 | 17 | 72 | UK: Platinum |
| 1984 | How Men Are | Released: 24 September 1984; Label: Virgin | 12 | — | — | — | 31 | 28 | — | 28 | — | UK: Silver |
| 1986 | Pleasure One | Released: 17 November 1986; Label: Virgin | 78 | — | — | — | — | — | — | — | 177 | |
| 1988 | Teddy Bear, Duke & Psycho | Released: 26 September 1988; Label: Virgin | — | — | — | — | 46 | — | — | — | — | |
| 1996 | Bigger Than America | Released: 20 September 1996; Label: Eye of the Storm, WEA | — | 155 | — | — | — | — | — | — | — | |
| 2005 | Before After | Released: 6 September 2005; Label: Alpha Engineering, Ninthwave | — | — | — | — | — | — | — | — | — | |
| 2008 | Naked as Advertised | Released: November 2008; Label: Absolute Zero | — | — | — | — | — | — | — | — | — | |
"—" denotes releases that did not chart or were not released

=== Live albums ===
| Year | Title | Details |
|---|---|---|
| 1999 | How Live Is | Released: 25 October 1999; Label: Almafame; Released since under various names on different labels, including Live at Last in 2008 |
| 2006 | Live at Scala, London | Released: 27 February 2006; Label: Live Here Now; Limited CD. DVD also released |
| 2013 | Live From Metropolis Studios | Released: 16 September 2013; Label: Edsel; Limited edition release with DVD |
| 2015 | Live at the Jazz Cafe, 2015 | Released: 3 September 2015; Label: Self-released |

=== Compilation albums ===
| Year | Title | Details | Peak chart positions | | |
| Year | Title | Details | UK | AUS | US |
|---|---|---|---|---|---|
| 1982 | Heaven 17 | Released: 1982; Label: Arista | — | — | 68 |
| 1986 | Endless | Released: 30 June 1986; Label: Virgin | 70 | — | — |
| 1992 | The Best of Heaven 17 | Released: 21 September 1992; Label: Virgin | — | — | — |
| 1993 | Higher and Higher: The Best of Heaven 17 | Released: 8 March 1993; Label: Virgin | 31 | 129 | — |
| 1996 | 16 Classic Tracks | Released: 1996; Label: Boots, EMI; Re-release under a different title of the 1992 The Best of Heaven 17 | — | — | — |
| 2000 | Heaven 17 | Released: 2000; Label: Disky | — | — | — |
| 2001 | We Blame Love | Released: 2001; Label: Falcon Neue Medien; Germany-only release; Compilation of live recordings | — | — | — |
| 2005 | Heaven 17 | Released: 2005; Label: Autarc Media; Only released in Germany, Austria and Switzerland | — | — | — |
| 2006 | Greatest Hits | Released: 16 October 2006; Label: Virgin; Includes a DVD of video clips | — | — | — |
| 2011 | So80s Presents Heaven 17 | Released: 7 February 2011; Label: EMI; Germany-only release | — | — | — |
| 2012 | Play to Win: The Very Best of Heaven 17 | Released: 6 January 2012; Label: Music Club Deluxe | — | — | — |
| 2021 | Essential Heaven 17 | Released: 23 July 2021; Label: Spectrum | 73 | — | — |
"—" denotes releases that did not chart or were not released

=== Remix albums ===
| Year | Title | Details |
|---|---|---|
| 1995 | The Remix Collection | Released: 3 April 1995; Label: Virgin |
| 1998 | Retox/Detox | Released: 27 July 1998; Label: Eagle |

=== Box sets ===
| Year | Title | Details |
|---|---|---|
| 2016 | 5 Classic Albums | Released: 17 June 2016; Label: Spectrum Music; 5-CD set of all five 1980s albums |
| 2019 | Play to Win: The Virgin Years | Released: 29 March 2019; Label: Edsel; CD: 10-CD set featuring all five albums from the 1980s, along with over 100 bonus tracks; Vinyl: 5-LP set featuring the five 1980s albums |
| 2020 | Another Big Idea (1996 – 2015) | Released: 20 March 2020; Label: Edsel; CD: 9-CD set featuring all three studio album since reforming in 1996, plus the remix album Retox/Detox, the live album How Live Is, plus many bonus tracks; Vinyl: 4-LP set featuring the three 1990s/2000s studio albums |

== EPs ==
| Year | Title | Details |
|---|---|---|
| 1996 | Executive Summary | Released: August 1996; Label: Eye of the Storm; Germany-only promo sampler |
| 2011 | Rarities 2011 | Released: November 2011; Label: Self-released; Free download-only release, available from Heaven 17's website |
| 2017 | Not for Public Broadcast | Released: 17 February 2017; Label: Society of Sound; Download-only mini-album |

== Singles ==
| Year | Single | Peak chart positions | | | | | | | | | | Album |
| Year | Single | UK | AUS | CAN | GER | IRE | ITA | NL | NZ | US | US Dance | Album |
|---|---|---|---|---|---|---|---|---|---|---|---|---|
| 1981 | "(We Don't Need This) Fascist Groove Thang" | 45 | 72 | — | — | — | — | — | — | — | 29 | Penthouse and Pavement |
| 1981 | "I'm Your Money" | — (Note: This single did not enter the UK Singles Chart, but did reach number 59 on the Record Business Top 100 Singles chart.) | — | — | — | — | — | — | — | — | — | Non-album single |
| 1981 | "Play to Win" | 46 | — | — | — | — | — | — | 39 | — | 19 | Penthouse and Pavement |
| 1981 | "Penthouse and Pavement" | 57 | 93 | — | — | — | — | — | 37 | — | 19 | Penthouse and Pavement |
| 1982 | "The Height of the Fighting (He-La-Hu)" | — (Note: This single did not enter the UK Singles Chart, but did reach number 41 on the Record Business Top 100 Singles chart.) | — | — | — | — | — | — | 20 | — | — | Penthouse and Pavement |
| 1982 | "Let Me Go" | 41 | 78 | 41 | — | 26 | — | — | — | 74 | 4 | The Luxury Gap |
| 1982 | "Who'll Stop the Rain" | — | — | — | — | — | — | — | — | — | 36 | The Luxury Gap |
| 1983 | "Temptation" | 2 | 38 | — | 11 | 3 | 45 | 25 | 15 | — | 34 | The Luxury Gap |
| 1983 | "We Live So Fast" | — | — | — | — | — | — | — | — | 102 | 34 | The Luxury Gap |
| 1983 | "Come Live with Me" | 5 | 100 | — | — | 7 | — | — | — | — | — | The Luxury Gap |
| 1983 | "Crushed by the Wheels of Industry" | 17 | — | — | — | 10 | — | — | — | — | 34 | The Luxury Gap |
| 1984 | "Sunset Now" | 24 | 93 | — | — | 18 | — | — | — | — | 39 | How Men Are |
| 1984 | "This Is Mine" | 23 | — | — | — | 25 | — | — | — | — | 28 | How Men Are |
| 1985 | "...(And That's No Lie)" | 52 | — | — | — | 22 | — | — | — | — | — | How Men Are |
| 1986 | "The Foolish Thing to Do" (feat. Jimmy Ruffin) | 80 | — | — | — | — | — | — | — | — | — | Non-album single |
| 1986 | "Contenders" | 80 | — | — | — | — | — | — | — | — | 6 | Pleasure One |
| 1987 | "Trouble" | 51 | — | — | 17 | — | — | — | — | — | — | Pleasure One |
| 1988 | "The Ballad of Go Go Brown" | 91 | — | — | — | — | — | — | — | — | — | Teddy Bear, Duke & Psycho |
| 1988 | "Train of Love in Motion" | 122 | — | — | — | — | — | — | — | — | — | Teddy Bear, Duke & Psycho |
| 1992 | "Temptation" (Brothers in Rhythm Remix) | 4 | 64 | — | 42 | 9 | — | 18 | — | — | — | Higher and Higher – The Best of Heaven 17 |
| 1993 | "(We Don't Need This) Fascist Groove Thang" (The Rapino Brothers Remixes) | 40 | 173 | — | — | — | — | — | — | — | — | Higher and Higher – The Best of Heaven 17 |
| 1993 | "Penthouse and Pavement" (The Tommy D Remixes) | 54 | 150 | — | — | — | — | — | — | — | 26 | Higher and Higher – The Best of Heaven 17 |
| 1996 | "Designing Heaven" | 128 | — | — | — | — | — | — | — | — | — | Bigger Than America |
| 1997 | "We Blame Love" | — | — | — | — | — | — | — | — | — | — | Bigger Than America |
| 1998 | "With This Ring Let Me Go" (Molella & Phil Jay present Heaven 17 meets Fast Eddie) | 80 | — | — | — | — | — | — | — | — | — | Non-album single |
| 2006 | "Hands Up to Heaven" | — | — | — | — | — | — | — | — | — | 6 | Before After |
| 2007 | "I'm Gonna Make You Fall in Love with Me" | — | — | — | — | — | — | — | — | — | — | Before After |
| 2008 | "Don't Fear the Reaper" | — | — | — | — | — | — | — | — | — | — | Before After |
| 2014 | "Illumination" and "Pray" (limited edition vinyl) | — | — | — | — | — | — | — | — | — | — | Not for Public Broadcast |
| 2016 | "Captured" and "Unseen" (limited edition vinyl) | — | — | — | — | — | — | — | — | — | — | Not for Public Broadcast |
"—" denotes releases that did not chart or were not released

== Videos ==
=== Video albums ===
| Year | Video | Details |
|---|---|---|
| 1983 | Heaven 17's Industrial Revolution | Released: 1983; Label: Virgin Video; Medium: VHS, VHD, LaserDisc |
| 2005 | Live at Scala, London 29 November 2005 | Released: 2005; Label: Live Here Now; Medium: DVD |
| 2010 | Penthouse And Pavement Live in Concert 2010 (30th Anniversary Special Edition) | Released: December 2010; Label: Blink TV, Strong Pictures; Medium: DVD |
| 2013 | Live From Metropolis Studios | Released: 16 September 2013; Label: Edsel; Medium: DVD |

=== Music videos ===
| Year | Title | Director |
|---|---|---|
| 1981 | "Penthouse and Pavement" | Steve Barron |
| 1982 | "Let Me Go" | Steve Barron |
| 1983 | "Temptation" | Chris Gabrin |
| 1983 | "We Live So Fast" | Jean-Pierre Berckmans |
| 1983 | "Come Live with Me" | Jean-Pierre Berckmans |
| 1983 | "Crushed by the Wheels of Industry" | Daniel Kleinman |
| 1984 | "Sunset Now" | Ray Smith |
| 1984 | "This Is Mine" | |
| 1985 | "...(And That's No Lie" | |
| 1986 | "The Foolish Thing to Do" | |
| 1986 | "Contenders" | Leslie Libman, Larry Williams |
| 1987 | "Trouble" | Leslie Libman, Larry Williams |
| 1992 | "Temptation" (Brothers in Rhythm Remix) | |
| 1993 | "Penthouse and Pavement" (1993 Remix) | Bob Caldwell |

== Soundtrack appearances ==
| Year | Film | Song |
|---|---|---|
| 1982 | Summer Lovers | "Play to Win" |
| 1982 | Night Shift | "Penthouse and Pavement" |
| 1984 | Electric Dreams | "Chase Runner", "Crushed by the Wheels of Industry" |
| 1994 | Sliver | "Penthouse and Pavement" |
| 1996 | Trainspotting | "Temptation" |
