= Higher and Higher: The Best of Heaven 17 =

Greatest hits album by Heaven 17
- Released: 8 March 1993
- Label: Virgin
- Producers: B.E.F.; Greg Walsh; Martyn Ware; Heaven 17

Heaven 17 chronology
Teddy Bear, Duke & Psycho (1988)	Higher and Higher: The Best of Heaven 17 (1993)	Bigger Than America (1996)

Alternative cover
- Cover for the 1999 re-issue: Temptation – The Best of Heaven 17

Higher and Higher: The Best of Heaven 17 is a greatest hits album by the English synth-pop band Heaven 17, released on 8 March 1993 by Virgin Records.

== Content ==
The compilation includes singles from Heaven 17's first four studio albums Penthouse and Pavement (1981), The Luxury Gap (1983), How Men Are (1984) and Pleasure One (1986), plus two new remixes that were released as singles: "Temptation" (Brothers in Rhythm Remix), which reached number four in the UK Singles Chart in 1992 and "(We Don't Need This) Fascist Groove Thang" (Rapino Edit), which reached number 40 in 1993. The US version of the album includes the Tommy D Master Remix of "Penthouse and Pavement" in place of the original version. The remix was also released as a single in the UK in 1993, reaching number 54.

== Re-issue ==
In 1999, Higher and Higher was re-issued as Temptation – The Best of Heaven 17, featuring new artwork and the same track listing as the original 1993 version.

== Critical reception ==
Professional ratings
Review scores
Source	Rating
AllMusic	4.5/5 stars
Music Week	3/5 stars
NME	4/10
Select	4/5 medals

Upon its release, John Harris, writing for NME, was critical of the compilation. He commented on the label's "marketing tactic" for releasing it to capitalise on the success of the Brothers in Rhythm remix of "Temptation" and noted how, like "most '80s synth-pop", the tracks "sound hideously dated". He felt that many of them were "plinky-winky plodding affairs" which are "made even more unbearable by Gregory's pseudo-operatic vocals and terribly pompous lyrics". Harris concluded, "At best, Heaven 17 sounded like Blancmange with brains. At worst, they were three pretentious home keyboard enthusiasts who'd read too many books – and it was that aspect that usually held the upper hand." In a review for AllMusic, Stephen Thomas Erlewine wrote that the album is "an adequate overview of [Heaven 17's] career", although he also described it as containing "too much music for casual fans", that the order of the tracks was "slightly illogical" and that the album is "not comprehensive enough for dedicated collectors".

== Track listing ==
All tracks written by Glenn Gregory, Ian Craig Marsh and Martyn Ware.

No.	Title	From album	Length
1.	"Temptation (Brothers in Rhythm Remix)"	New track	6:53
2.	"(We Don't Need This) Fascist Groove Thang (Rapino Edit)"	New track	3:59
3.	"Let Me Go"	The Luxury Gap	4:15
4.	"Come Live with Me"	The Luxury Gap	3:34
5.	"This Is Mine"	How Men Are	3:51
6.	"I'm Your Money"	Penthouse and Pavement	3:17
7.	"Play to Win"	Penthouse and Pavement	3:22
8.	"And That's No Lie"	How Men Are	9:01
9.	"Contenders"	Pleasure One	4:28
10.	"We Live So Fast"	The Luxury Gap	3:48
11.	"Sunset Now"	How Men Are	3:30
12.	"Trouble"	Pleasure One	4:01
13.	"Height of the Fighting (He-La-Hu)"	Penthouse and Pavement	3:05
14.	"Penthouse and Pavement"	Penthouse and Pavement	6:21
15.	"Crushed by the Wheels of Industry"	The Luxury Gap	5:52
16.	"(We Don't Need This) Fascist Groove Thang" (original version)"	Penthouse and Pavement	4:17
17.	"Temptation" (original version)"	The Luxury Gap	3:32

Note

- The US version of the album replaces track 14 with "Penthouse and Pavement" (Tommy D's Master Remix)

== Production ==
- Produced by B.E.F. except tracks 1, 4, 8, 10, 11, 15, 17 by B.E.F. & Greg Walsh; track 5 by Martyn Ware & Greg Walsh; tracks 9 and 12 by Heaven 17
- Additional production and remix on track 1 by Brothers in Rhythm; track 2 by The Rapino Brothers; track 14 on U.S. version by Tommy D

== Charts ==
Chart performance for Higher and Higher: The Best of Heaven 17
Chart (1993)	Peak position
Australian Albums (ARIA)	129
UK Albums (Official Charts)	31
