= Heaven 17 =

English new wave and synth-pop band

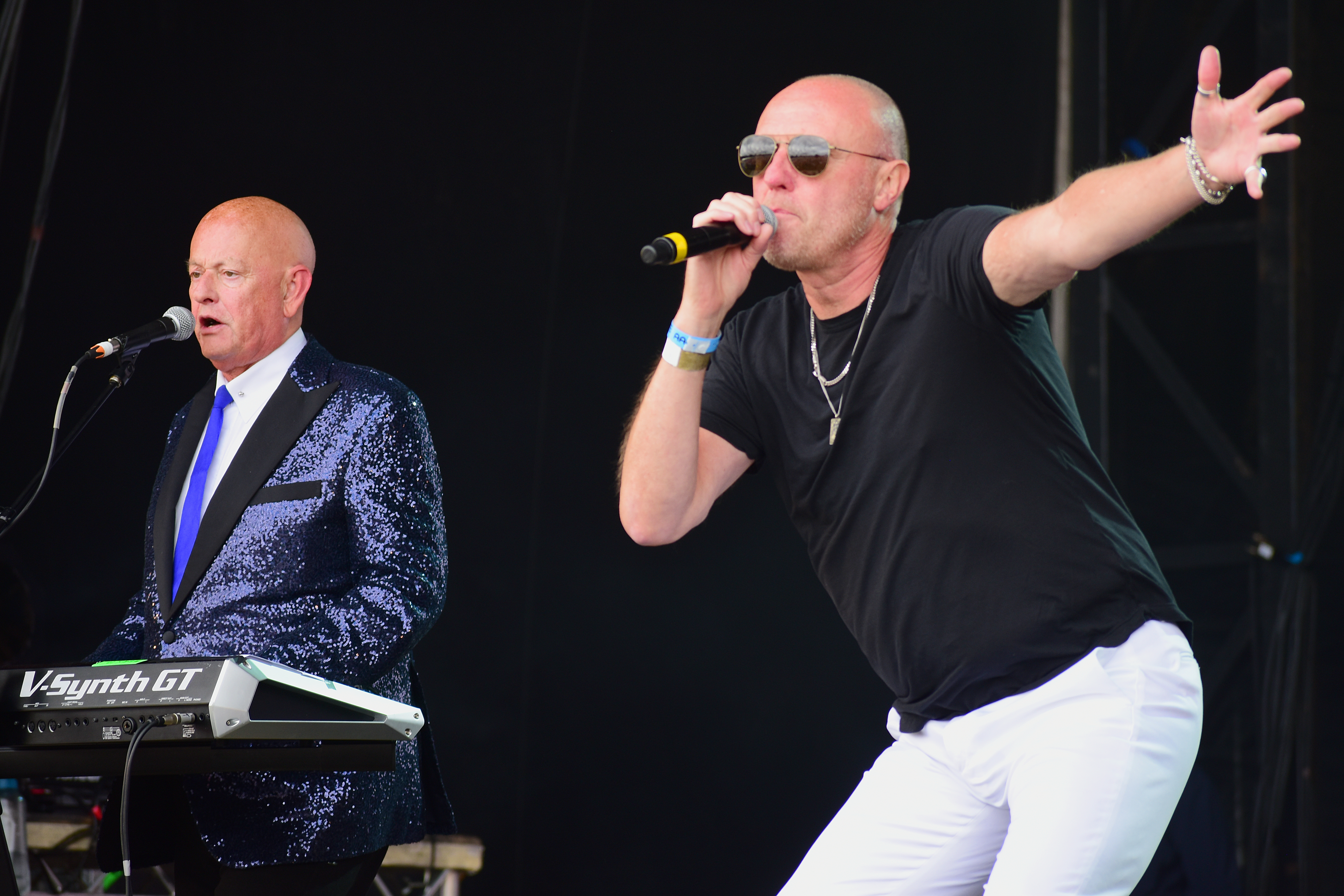
- Heaven 17 performing live in Liverpool, 2021; Left to right: Martyn Ware (keyboards), Glenn Gregory (vocals)

Background information
- Origin: Sheffield, England
- Genres: Synth-pop; electropop; electronic; new wave
- Works: Heaven 17 discography
- Years active: 1980–present
- Labels: EMI; Virgin; Sony BMG
- Spinoff of: British Electric Foundation; The Human League
- Members: Glenn Gregory; Martyn Ware
- Past members: Ian Craig Marsh
- Website: heaven17.com

Heaven 17 are an English synth-pop band formed in Sheffield in 1980. The band were originally a trio of vocalist Glenn Gregory and Human League co-founders Martyn Ware and Ian Craig Marsh, both on synthesizers.

The band achieved their biggest critical and commercial successes with their first three albums, Penthouse and Pavement (1981), The Luxury Gap (1983), and How Men Are (1984). Originally a studio-only group, they did not play their first live concerts until 1997. Marsh left the band in 2006, since which time Gregory and Ware have continued as a duo.

== History ==
=== 1980s ===
==== Origin and formation ====
Ian Craig Marsh and Martyn Ware were the founding members of pioneering Sheffield synthpop group the Human League; Glenn Gregory (who had previously been in a punk band called Musical Vomit with Marsh) had been their original choice when seeking a lead singer for the band but as he had moved to London to work as a photographer at the time, they chose Ware's school friend Philip Oakey instead. When personal and creative tensions within the group reached a breaking point in late 1980, Marsh and Ware left the band, ceding the Human League name to Oakey. They formed the production company British Electric Foundation (B.E.F.).

==== 1981: B.E.F. and Penthouse and Pavement ====
B.E.F.'s first recordings were a cassette-only album called Music for Stowaways and an LP called Music for Listening To, which was re-released on CD in 1997 with two extra tracks. Shortly after, they completed their line-up when they recruited their friend, photographer Glenn Gregory, as vocalist. Taking their new name from a fictional pop band mentioned in Anthony Burgess's dystopian novel A Clockwork Orange (where The Heaven Seventeen are at number 4 in the charts with "Inside"), Heaven 17 was intended to be just one of the musical projects for British Electric Foundation.

Like the Human League, Heaven 17 used synthesisers and drum machines heavily (the Linn LM-1 programmed by Ware). Session musicians were used for bass guitar and guitar (John Wilson) and grand piano (Nick Plytas). Whereas the band's former colleagues the Human League had gone on to major chart success in 1981, Heaven 17 struggled to make an impact. Their debut single "(We Don't Need This) Fascist Groove Thang" attracted some attention and was banned by the BBC due to concerns by Radio 1's legal department that it libelled Ronald Reagan, who had recently been elected President of the United States. Neither "Fascist Groove Thang" nor any of the three other singles taken from the band's debut album Penthouse and Pavement reached the UK Top 40. The album itself proved to be a success, however, peaking at Number 14 on the UK Albums Chart, and was later certified gold by the BPI in 1982.

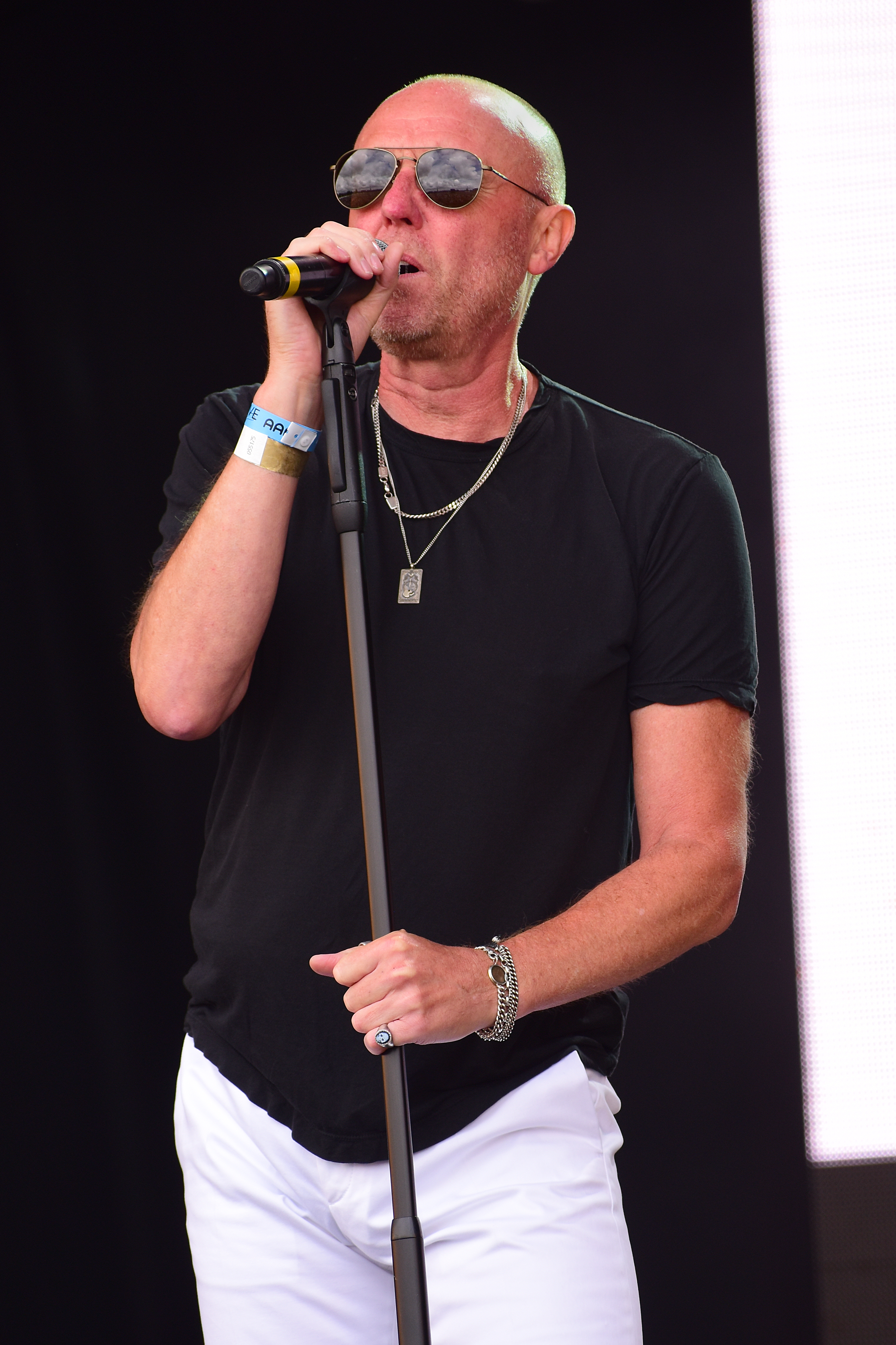
Glenn Gregory on stage in 2021

Around this time, Ware and Marsh produced two further albums as B.E.F., the first being Music of Quality & Distinction Volume One featuring Glenn Gregory, Tina Turner, Paula Yates, Billy Mackenzie, Hank Marvin, Paul Jones, Bernie Nolan, and Gary Glitter. The tracks were cover versions of songs that Ware, Marsh and Gregory had grown up listening to. The album peaked at number 25. The second album was Geisha Boys and Temple Girls for the dance troupe Hot Gossip, which used songs formerly recorded by the Human League and Heaven 17, and a track each from Sting and Talking Heads. B.E.F. took over production duties when Richard James Burgess of the band Landscape was unable to complete the album.

==== 1982–1983: The Luxury Gap and commercial success ====
In October 1982, Heaven 17 released their new single "Let Me Go", which charted just outside the UK Top 40 (but reached the Irish Top 30). However, in 1983 the band's fortunes changed. Their next single, "Temptation" (on which they were augmented by vocalist Carol Kenyon and a studio orchestra), reached number 2 on the UK Singles Chart in spring 1983 and became their biggest hit. The song was taken from their second album, The Luxury Gap, which featured further chart hits "Come Live with Me" (UK #5) and "Crushed by the Wheels of Industry" (UK #17). The album itself charted at number 4 on the UK Albums Chart, their highest ever position, and was certified platinum by the BPI in 1984.

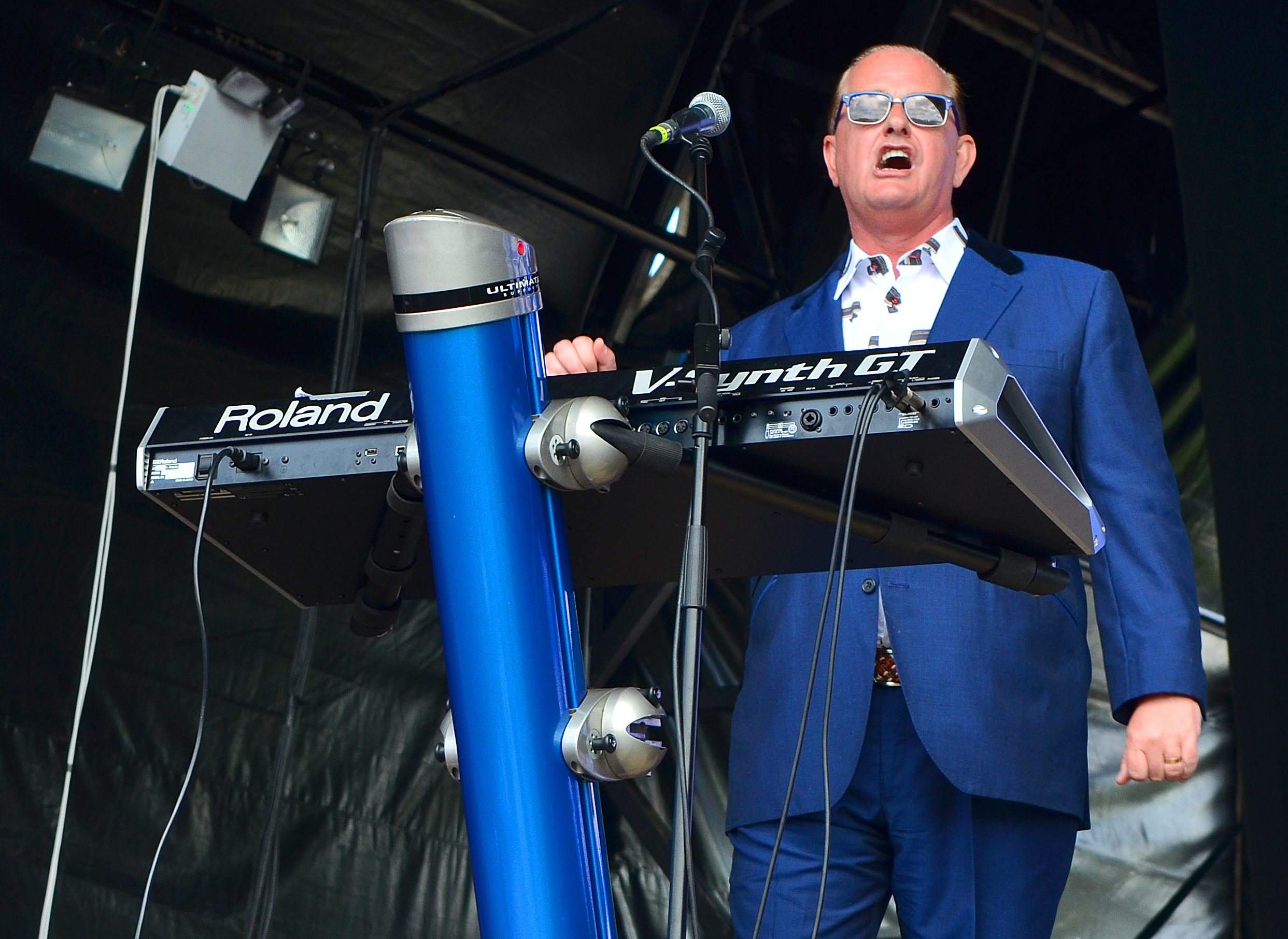
Martyn Ware on stage in 2014

In the United States, their self-titled Heaven 17 album was a re-working of Penthouse and Pavement with three songs deleted and replaced by "Let Me Go", "Who'll Stop the Rain", and "I'm Your Money" (along with a different mix of "The Height of the Fighting"). American and Canadian new wave audiences were most familiar with "Let Me Go", which received high rotation airplay on alternative rock and new wave format radio stations such as Los Angeles, California's KROQ-FM, and Long Island, New York's WLIR, an CKOI-FM (Montreal), a regular Top Ten station, and additionally, frequent MTV exposure.

==== 1983–1985: Collaborations and How Men Are ====
Towards the end of 1983, the band (under their B.E.F. guise and assisted by Greg Walsh) helped relaunch Tina Turner's career, producing, and providing backing vocals on her hit "Let's Stay Together", a cover of the Al Green song. 1984 saw the release of Heaven 17's third studio album, How Men Are, which reached number 12 in the UK Albums Chart and was certified silver by the BPI. The album featured the Earth, Wind & Fire brass section, and two singles from the album ("Sunset Now" and "This Is Mine") both reached the UK Top 40, but would be the band's last singles to do so until various remixes were released in the 1990s.

The band also worked on the Band Aid single "Do They Know It's Christmas?" at the end of 1984, with Gregory supplying vocals alongside Midge Ure and Sting, after a personal request from Ure that he attend. However, the band did not perform at Live Aid the following year. Heaven 17's first "live" performance was in 1982 on the UK television programme The Tube (though the band made use of backing tapes during this performance).

In 1985 Heaven 17 joined the Red Wedge collective.

==== 1986–1988: Critical and commercial decline ====
After the remix album Endless peaked at number 70 in July 1986, the band's fourth studio album Pleasure One was released in November 1986 and featured the single "Trouble" (UK No. 51, Germany #17). The album contained a number of songs that were originally intended for a French film project that never came to be. This was also the first Heaven 17 album to not mention production credits for B.E.F. and the abbreviation would not appear again until the Bigger Than America album in 1996. It was followed up in 1988 with the album Teddy Bear, Duke & Psycho (featuring the singles "The Ballad of Go Go Brown" and "Train of Love in Motion"), although these two albums were poorly received and had little commercial success. In September 1988, the band appeared on the bill at the Sport Aid event in Sheffield. Heaven 17 were managed by Keith Bourton for Heavenly Management Ltd. during much of this period.

=== 1990s ===
The early 1990s was a quiet period for the band, though Ware produced a second B.E.F. album in 1991, to follow 1982's original Music of Quality & Distinction. This album again featured Tina Turner and Billy Mackenzie, but this time also featured artists such as Scritti Politti's Green Gartside, Lalah Hathaway, Billy Preston, and Chaka Khan. Ware also became a producer for the likes of Terence Trent D'Arby, Soft Cell's Marc Almond, and Erasure. Gregory, meanwhile, went on to form the band Honeyroot with Keith Lowndes, then Ugly with John Uriel and Ian Wright .

In late 1992, a Brothers in Rhythm remix of "Temptation" reached number 4 and was followed by the compilation album Higher and Higher – The Best of Heaven 17 in 1993. Remixes of "(We Don't Need This) Fascist Groove Thang" and "Penthouse and Pavement" were also minor hits in 1993. However, the band would not release any new material as Heaven 17 until 1996's Bigger Than America. The album failed to chart in the UK.

=== 2000s ===
The year 2005 saw the release of a new studio album, Before After, which had a much more contemporary dance sound compared to previous albums. A CD composed entirely of remixes of the song "Hands Up to Heaven" from the album reached number six on the US Billboard Hot Dance Club Play chart in May 2006. In October of the same year, Virgin Records issued a greatest hits compilation album entitled Sight and Sound, which included a previously-unheard version of "Temptation" with spoken vocals by an unknown student from Germany whom the band met in 1982. It had been discovered on 1-inch tape by Gregory's mother and was remastered by Simon Heyworth. In November 2005, Heaven 17 were filmed for a live DVD playing to a packed house at The Scala in London. The DVD contains an in-depth question-and-answer session with both Ware and Gregory, along with fans' reactions to the gig.

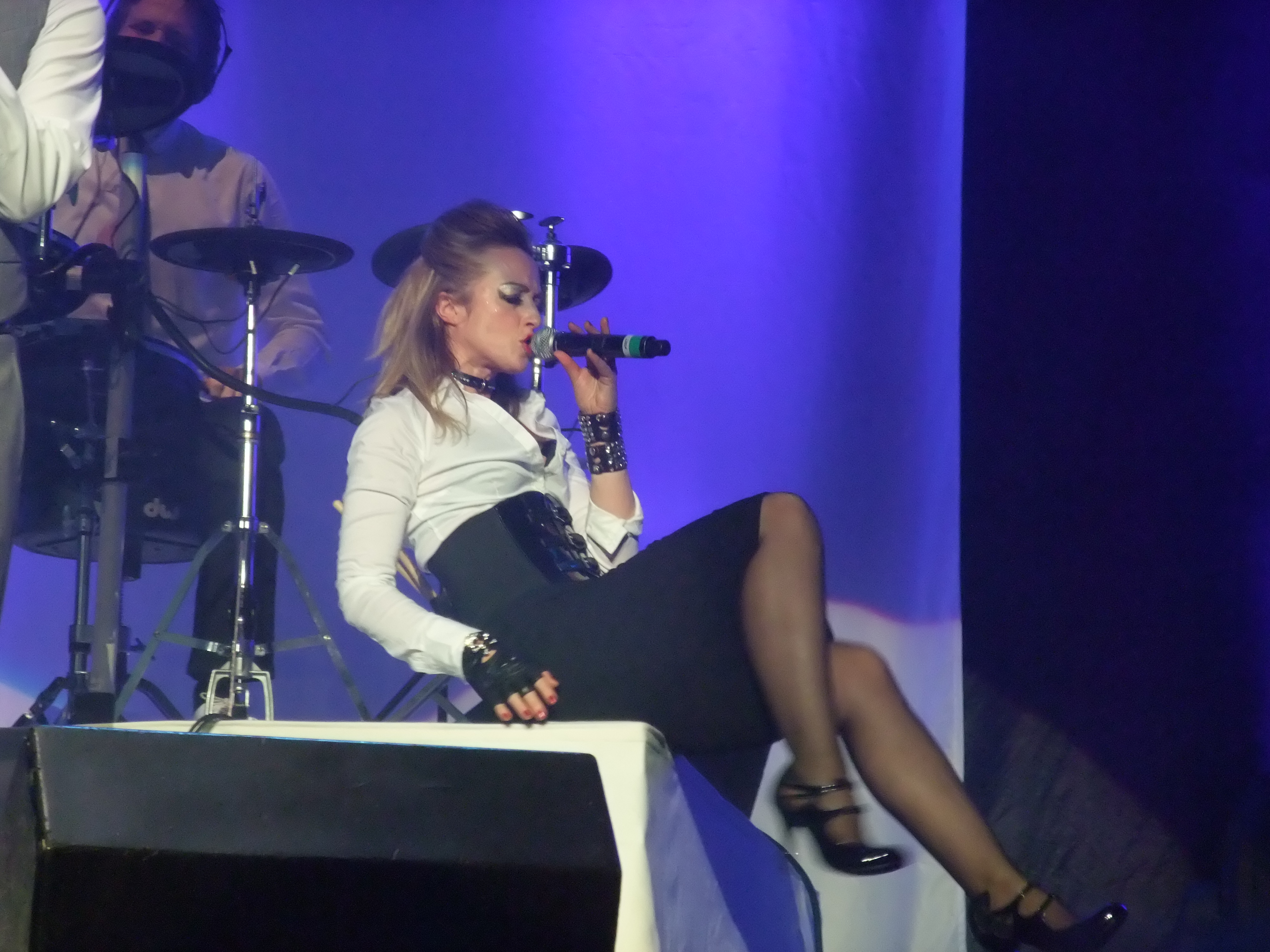
Billie Godfrey onstage with Heaven 17

In 2006, Marsh stopped making live appearances with the band. In an early 2009 interview, Ware stated that Marsh had left the band and was now studying at university. Beginning in the mid-1990s, Billie Godfrey worked with the band as a backing vocalist and appeared with them at concerts. She performed as part of the band on 21 November 2008 for their highest profile TV appearance of recent years on Now That's What I Call 1983 on ITV1.

In December 2008, Heaven 17 toured the UK as part of the Sheffield band-based Steel City Tour alongside the Human League and ABC. Coinciding with this was the release of their new album, Naked as Advertised – Versions 08, issued through the Just Music record label. The album contained re-workings of tracks such as "Temptation" along with versions of Ware songs best known from his time with the Human League, including "Being Boiled" and "Empire State Human", as well as a cover of the Associates' hit "Party Fears Two". The band were managed by Nick Ashton-Hart for much of the early 2000s.

In December 2009, Heaven 17 made appearances at the "Nokia Night of the Proms" in Germany.

=== 2010s ===
On 16 February 2010, Heaven 17 joined La Roux to record a joint live session for the BBC which was shown on the BBC Red Button interactive channel in January 2010. Glenn Gregory joined La Roux on stage at Glastonbury Festival on 26 June 2010, performing "Temptation". (La Roux cite Heaven 17 as one of their main influences). The two acts also appeared live on stage at the War Child Brit Awards aftershow in February 2010.

In the run up to their 30th anniversary, the band announced several dates in which they would perform their 1981 debut album Penthouse and Pavement live in its entirety for the first time. The dates were scheduled over November and December 2010 with the first date held on 10 November 2010 at the well known Leadmill live music venue in Sheffield. By chance the Leadmill also celebrated a 30-year anniversary in 2010. By their own admission this Leadmill gig was one of the band's most successful. The band performed a couple of dates of the Penthouse and Pavement tour in March 2010, one of which was in Sheffield and was filmed and shown on BBC Two on 16 May 2010. An hour-long documentary about the making of the album was shown on BBC Two the following night. This film was also screened at a special "Music in Sheffield" evening of films at the Showroom in Sheffield, which Martyn Ware attended, on the eve of the announcement of the City of Culture 2013.

The band appeared on Later... with Jools Holland on 22 October 2010, performing "(We Don't Need This) Fascist Groove Thang" and "Temptation" and appeared in BBC Children in Need in November 2010. They also made a tongue-in-cheek appearance in TV advertisements for Sheffield-based broadband provider Plusnet. On 22 November, the band released a 2 disc DVD combining never-seen-before documentary and rehearsal footage with the band's full live concert filmed in Sheffield in March 2010. Also included was a unique collection of all the digital videos used in the live show, set to the accompanying live audio from the performance. Each video was commissioned from a different visual artist and included both established up-and-coming artists from the worlds of digital and graphic design, fine art, and film.

Since 2011 the band's regular keyboard player has been Berenice Scott (the daughter of Robin Scott of the group M and "Pop Muzik" fame). In July 2014, they appeared as special guests of John Shuttleworth in his BBC Radio 4 programme John Shuttleworth's Music Lounge and performed some of Shuttleworth's material.

In November 2015, a compilation album called 80s Recovered featured many groups including Heaven 17. They performed a cover of Elton John's "Rocket Man", with a regular version, and a remix.

During October 2016, Heaven 17 undertook a dual headline tour with their British Electronic Foundation (B.E.F.) The dates included venues in Liverpool, Birmingham, Glasgow, Gateshead, Manchester, Bury St Edmunds, Basingstoke and London. B.E.F. enlisted Mari Wilson, Glen Matlock (Sex Pistols), and Peter Hooton (The Farm) to present new arrangements of songs from the B.E.F. back catalogue. The tour was significant in that it was the first time that Heaven 17 had played the Sheffield City Hall, having not performed there during the 1980s.

In January 2017, Ware and Gregory started work on a new album at Ware's London studio "The House of Illustrious". A work-in-progress version of this album was released by Bowers & Wilkins under the title "Not For Public Broadcast" (Society of Sound #105).

In late 2018 Heaven 17 gigs in Liverpool, London, Bristol, Glasgow, Manchester and Sheffield celebrated the 35th anniversary of The Luxury Gap album. The tour support was provided by X-Propaganda featuring Claudia Brücken and Susanne Freytag from '80s band Propaganda.

In October/November 2019 the band took part as 'Special Guests' on a tour with Squeeze.

=== 2020s ===
In September 2021 the group performed the first two Human League albums Reproduction (1979) and Travelogue (1980) in Sheffield and London with long-standing collaborator Malcolm Garrett providing live visuals on stage.

In September 2024, Ware said Rockstar Games had asked to license "Temptation" for its upcoming video game Grand Theft Auto VI for US$7,500 per writer; Ware countered with an offer for US$75,000 or "a reasonable royalty" but said Rockstar declined. Ware responded "Go fuck yourself", citing the estimated US$8.6 billion revenue earned by the game's predecessor, Grand Theft Auto V. Naomi Pohl, the general secretary of the Musicians' Union, felt Ware's reaction was unsurprising and said the game's high profile would not necessarily translate to higher exposure for the song, noting that "streaming doesn't sustain careers".

A new studio album was confirmed to be in the works, along with a documentary, in August 2025.

== Discography ==
- Penthouse and Pavement (1981)
- The Luxury Gap (1983)
- How Men Are (1984)
- Pleasure One (1986)
- Teddy Bear, Duke & Psycho (1988)
- Bigger Than America (1996)
- Before After (2005)
- Naked as Advertised (2008)
