= The Dignity of Labour =

EP by The Human League
- Released: April 1979
- Recorded: 1978; Sheffield
- Genre: Electronic, ambient, industrial
- Length: 14:45
- Label: Fast Records VF-1
- Producer: Philip Oakey; Martyn Ware; Ian Craig Marsh

The Human League chronology
| Being Boiled (1978) | The Dignity of Labour (1979) | Empire State Human (1979) |

The Dignity of Labour is a 12" vinyl record released in 1979. The tracks were written and performed by The Human League featuring a line-up of Martyn Ware, Ian Craig Marsh and Phil Oakey. It was released as the follow-up to their earlier single "Being Boiled" (b/w "Circus of Death") on Fast Product Records, the label on which the band released their early singles.

All four parts are instrumental pieces of electronic music, loosely tied together with a story depicting the construction of the Vostok 1 spacecraft, as well as the launch of the rocket and the pioneering Soviet cosmonaut Yuri Gagarin into space. The cover art depicts Gagarin, having just landed on Earth, about to receive a medal of honour.

At the time of release, the record contained a free single on flexidisc which featured a recording of the band members and Bob Last discussing whether or not to include a flexidisc, the benefits and detractions of including a flexidisc, and what the flexidisc should contain (in homage to the film Dark Star). Later they talk about Yuri Gagarin, Yuri Gagarin having tea after landing Vostok 1, individual as opposed to group effort and the fact that eventually everyone dies.

== Track listing ==
1. "The Dignity of Labour (Pt. 1)" – (4:21) — "The first part has the miners underground in Russia, digging up the coal to make steel"
2. "The Dignity of Labour (Pt. 2)" – (2:46) — "The second part shows gantries being made from the steel, for Yuri Gagarin's spaceship."
3. "The Dignity of Labour (Pt. 3)" – (3:49) — "The third part is an instrumental tribute to Yuri Gagarin."
4. "The Dignity of Labour (Pt. 4)" – (3:49)

+ bonus spoken word flexi-disc (4:11)

== Miscellaneous ==
The Roland System 100 synthesizer was used extensively on every track, providing sequencing, sound effects, melodies and percussion; also used is a Jupiter 4.
