= Travelogue (The Human League album) =

1980 The Human League album

Studio album by The Human League
- Released: 16 May 1980
- Recorded: 1980
- Studio: Monumental Pictures Studio in Sheffield
- Genres: Post-punk; synth-punk; synth-pop
- Length: 39:24
- Label: Virgin
- Producers: The Human League; Richard Manwaring

The Human League chronology
Reproduction (1979)	Travelogue (1980)	Dare (1981)

Singles from Travelogue
- 1. "Only After Dark" Released: May 1980; 2. "Being Boiled" Released: August 1980

Professional ratings
Review scores
Source	Rating
AllMusic	2.5/5 stars
Mojo	4/5 stars
Muzik	5/5 stars
Q	4/5 stars
The Rolling Stone Album Guide	2/5 stars
Smash Hits	8/10
Sounds	3/5 stars
Uncut	4/5 stars

Travelogue is the second full-length studio album released by British synth-pop group The Human League, released in May 1980. It was the last album with founding members Ian Craig Marsh and Martyn Ware, as they would leave to form Heaven 17 later that year.

== Background ==
For Travelogue, the band worked with a new co-producer, Richard Manwaring, who in 1981 produced OMD's platinum-selling Architecture & Morality and Heaven 17's Penthouse and Pavement.

"Tracks like 'The Black Hit of Space' are way ahead of their time," observed Martyn Ware. "Pumping the synths through massive distortion and overloading the desk. How prescient is that? The ethos of what we were doing was to kind of future-proof it all. We were envisaging people playing this music in ten or twenty years' time."

Travelogue entered the UK album chart at #16, which was also its peak, and remained on the chart for nine weeks in 1980 – a vast improvement on their debut album, Reproduction, which failed to chart at all the year before. Following the departure of founding members Ware and Ian Craig Marsh, who went on to form Heaven 17, remaining members Phil Oakey and Adrian Wright moved The Human League in a new direction with a new line up. When they began to make a commercial impact the following year, Travelogue re-entered the chart in August 1981 for a further 33 weeks, and was certified Gold by the BPI in May 1982.

The sleeve repurposes a photo, "Sunset Silhouettes Trapper and Dogs Crossing Saganagons Lake, Ontario", which featured in a 1962 edition of the National Geographic magazine.

== Singles ==
Two songs were released as singles from the album; a re-recorded version of the band's first single, "Being Boiled" (this time as part of the Holiday '80 EP released a month before the album), and a cover of Mick Ronson's "Only After Dark" (which was ultimately given away as a free single with a re-issue of the band's 1979 single "Empire State Human" in June 1980). Neither of these were successful ("Being Boiled" became a UK Top-10 hit in 1982, but it was a stereo remix of the old single version, not the Holiday '80/Travelogue version). The album also featured a cover of the famed advertising jingle for Gordon's Gin, written by Jeff Wayne.

== Re-issues ==
Virgin Records remastered and re-issued Travelogue on CD in 1988, with an expanded track listing which included the Holiday '80 EP, the disco single "I Don't Depend on You" (originally released under the moniker "The Men"), and the single "Boys and Girls", which had been produced by Oakey and Wright after the line-up split.

The Canadian issue of Travelogue was released in a different sleeve, similar to the Holiday '80 front cover, and the track listing also differed: "The Voice of Buddha" (the re-recorded version of "Being Boiled" under a different name), "The Black Hit of Space", "Only After Dark", "Life Kills", "Dreams of Leaving" b/w "Crow and a Baby", "The Touchables", "Gordon's Gin", "Rock 'N' Roll"/"Night Clubbing", "WXJL Tonight". Similarly, the Australian issue also featured a different track listing, though the original sleeve and song titles were retained for this release: "Being Boiled", "The Black Hit of Space", "Only After Dark", "Life Kills", "Dreams of Leaving" b/w "Crow and a Baby", "The Touchables", "Rock 'N' Roll", "Marianne" (alternate version), "Gordon's Gin", "WXJL Tonight".

In 2016, both Travelogue and its predecessor Reproduction were re-issued on 180g vinyl.

== Legacy ==
In 2015 Travelogue was the subject of a BBC 6Music documentary as part of the "Sounds of a City" series. The programme examined the album's sound and how it grew out of the city, going on to influence a new generation of musicians. The documentary features interviews with Martyn Ware, Jarvis Cocker and Róisín Murphy, among others.

== Track listing ==
No.	Title	Writer(s)	Length
1.	"The Black Hit of Space"	Marsh, Oakey, Ware, Wright	4:11
2.	"Only After Dark"	Scott Richardson, Mick Ronson	3:50
3.	"Life Kills"	Marsh, Oakey, Ware, Wright	3:07
4.	"Dreams of Leaving"	Marsh, Oakey, Ware, Wright	5:49
5.	"Toyota City"	Marsh, Oakey, Ware, Wright	3:24
6.	"Crow and a Baby"	Marsh, Oakey, Ware, Wright	3:43
7.	"The Touchables"	Marsh, Oakey, Ware, Wright	3:21
8.	"Gordon's Gin"	Jeff Wayne	2:58
9.	"Being Boiled"	Marsh, Oakey, Ware	4:21
10.	"WXJL Tonight"	Marsh, Oakey, Ware, Wright	4:40
Total length:			39:24

CD bonus tracks
No.	Title	Writer(s)	Length
11.	"Marianne"	Marsh, Oakey, Ware	3:18
12.	"Dancevision"	Marsh, Ware	2:22
13.	"Rock 'n' Roll/Nightclubbing"	Gary Glitter, Mike Leander/David Bowie, James Osterberg	6:23
14.	"Tom Baker"	Oakey, Wright	4:01
15.	"Boys and Girls"	Oakey, Wright	3:15
16.	"I Don't Depend on You" (performed by The Men)	Marsh, Oakey, Ware	4:35
17.	"Cruel" (performed by The Men)	Marsh, Oakey, Ware	4:40
Total length:			28:34 (67:58)

== Personnel ==
The Human League

- Philip Oakey – vocals, synthesizer
- Ian Craig Marsh – vocals, synthesizer
- Martyn Ware – vocals, synthesizer
- Philip Adrian Wright – film technician

== Charts ==
Chart (1980)	Peak position
UK Albums Chart	16
