= The Height of the Fighting (He-La-Hu) =

Single by Heaven 17

from the album Penthouse and Pavement
- B-side: "Honeymoon in New York"
- Released: 12 February 1982
- Length: 2:55
- Label: Virgin
- Songwriters: Martyn Ware; Ian Craig Marsh; Glenn Gregory
- Producers: Martyn Ware; Ian Craig Marsh

Heaven 17 singles chronology
"Penthouse and Pavement" (1981)	"The Height of the Fighting (He-La-Hu)" (1982)	"Let Me Go" (1982)

"The Height of the Fighting (He-La-Hu)" is a song by the English synth-pop band Heaven 17, released on 12 February 1982 as the fifth and final single from their debut album, Penthouse and Pavement. It was written by Martyn Ware, Ian Craig Marsh and Glenn Gregory, and produced by Ware and Marsh.

"The Height of the Fighting" was remixed for its release as a single, with more aggressive drums plus brass both missing from the album track. The added horn section was performed by Beggar and Co. The song failed to make a chart appearance in the UK Singles Chart, but did reach the unnumbered 'bubbling under' section for three consecutive weeks, which would have been equivalent to a position between 76 and 100 at a time when the main charts covered the top 75.

== Critical reception ==
Upon its release, Red Starr of Smash Hits considered the single a "pointless rehash of an album track in a truly dreadful cover". They added: "The sooner BEF give up this dead-end synthetic funk and turn their talents back to writing classic stuff like "Dreams of Leaving" and "Radio WXJL" from Travelogue the better." Sunie of Record Mirror noted: "It doesn't quite match the magnificent "Penthouse and Pavement" single but it's pretty fab nonetheless." Tony Parsons of the NME remarked that Heaven 17 "serve up a sagging self-improvement chant full of tinny brass and funk-by-numbers, brimming over with a bossy litany admonishing one to sweat and heave and ho etcetera". Allan Jones of Melody Maker was also unimpressed stating that "listening ... is a little like trying to tattoo an ice-cube; you can't grip it and it's always sliding away". He added, "[Heaven] 17 seems so eager to impress and dazzle they virtually frogmarch you to the dancefloor."

In a retrospective review of the album, Dan LeRoy of AllMusic considered the song one of the "standout combinations of witty lyrics and whiplash electro-grooves". Tim O'Neil of PopMatters commented that the song "acts as both a satire of gung-ho militarism and a rallying cry for anti-capitalist insurgency".

== Track listing ==
7-inch single (UK release)

1. "The Height of the Fighting (He-La-Hu)" - 2:55
2. "Honeymoon in New York" - 2:12

7-inch single (European release)

1. "The Height of the Fighting" - 2:59
2. "Penthouse and Pavement" - 6:23

7-inch single (New Zealand release)

1. "Height of the Fighting (He-La-Hu)" - 2:55
2. "He-La-Lu" - 2:58
3. "Honeymoon in New York" - 2:12

12-inch single

1. "Height of the Fighting (He-La-Hu)" - 2:55
2. "He-La-Lu" - 2:58
3. "Honeymoon in New York" - 2:12

== Personnel ==
Heaven 17

- Glenn Gregory - lead vocals, backing vocals
- Martyn Ware - Linn LM-1 programming, backing vocals, producer
- Ian Craig Marsh - synthesizer, producer

Additional personnel

- Nick Patrick - assistant producer, engineer
- BilBo - mastering

Other

- Jill Mumford - artwork

== Charts ==
Chart (1982)	Peak position
New Zealand (Recorded Music NZ)	20
UK Top 100 Singles (Record Business)	41
