= Crushed by the Wheels of Industry =

Single by Heaven 17

from the album The Luxury Gap
- B-side: "Crushed by the Wheels of Industry (Part II)"
- Released: 29 August 1983
- Genre: Funk-pop; dance-pop; electropop
- Length: 3:43
- Label: Virgin
- Songwriters: Glenn Gregory; Ian Craig Marsh; Martyn Ware
- Producers: British Electric Foundation; Greg Walsh

Heaven 17 singles chronology
"Come Live With Me" (1983)	"Crushed by the Wheels of Industry" (1983)	"Sunset Now" (1984)

Music video
- "Crushed by the Wheels of Industry" on YouTube

"Crushed by the Wheels of Industry" is a song by the English synth-pop band Heaven 17, released on 29 August 1983 by Virgin Records as the fifth and final single from their second studio album, The Luxury Gap (1983). It was written by Glenn Gregory, Ian Craig Marsh and Martyn Ware, and produced by Marsh and Ware (as British Electric Foundation) and Greg Walsh. It reached number 17 in the UK singles chart and would be the band's last top 20 hit in the UK until 1992's Brothers in Rhythm remix of "Temptation".

== Critical reception ==
Upon release, Tom Hibbert of Smash Hits commented: "Highly entertaining pop funk with sardonic 'woo-woos' and a cynical jab at society in general. Witty dance music with gormless backing chants and a piano that is everything that Shakatak isn't." Number One wrote: "Thankfully Heaven 17 have finally clicked and make dance records that you can actually dance to (unlike "Penthouse and Pavement"). Now their stylish sound is pure nourishment for the feet, as well as for the head and heart." Paul Simper for Number One said: "The threesome did work pretty hard at getting a hit before with fine dance records like "Penthouse and Pavement" and "Play to Win"; "Crushed By the Wheels" is along similar lines and though still less than great it's easily the best of the three they've made as popstars."

== Formats ==
7-inch single

1. "Crushed by the Wheels of Industry (Part I)" – 3:43
2. "Crushed by the Wheels of Industry (Part II)" – 3:15

12-inch single

1. "Crushed by the Wheels of Industry (Parts I & II – Uninterrupted single version)" – 6:58
2. "Crushed by the Wheels of Industry (Album version)" – 5:55
3. "Crushed by the Wheels of Industry (Extended dance version)" – 6:21

12-inch single (US release)

1. "Crushed by the Wheels of Industry (Industrial Mix)" – 6:54
2. "Crushed by the Wheels of Industry (Album version)" – 5:51
3. "Crushed by the Wheels of Industry (Dub version)" – 6:17

12-inch single (Canada release)

1. "Crushed by the Wheels of Industry (The Industrial version)" – 6:52
2. "Crushed by the Wheels of Industry (The Extended dance version)" – 6:20

== Personnel ==
Credits are adapted from the album's liner notes.

Heaven 17

- Glenn Gregory – vocals
- Martyn Ware – synthesizers, Linn LM-1 programming, backing vocals, producer
- Ian Craig Marsh – synthesizers, producer

Additional personnel

- Greg Walsh – piano, synthesizers, producer, engineer
- Nick Plytas – piano
- John Wilson – guitars, guitar synthesizer

== Charts ==
Chart (1983)	Peak position
French Singles Chart	34
Irish Singles Chart	10
UK singles chart	17
