= Geisha Boys and Temple Girls =

Studio album by Arlene Phillips' Hot Gossip
- Released: 1981
- Length: 42:28
- Label: Dindisc
- Producer: Martyn Ware

Geisha Boys and Temple Girls is a studio album by British dance troupe Arlene Phillips' Hot Gossip. It was released in 1981 and was produced by BEF, a project by former Human League members Martyn Ware and Ian Craig Marsh.

== Track listing ==
Side A
No.	Title	Writer(s)	Length
1.	"Soul Warfare"	BEF, Glenn Gregory	4:58
2.	"Houses in Motion"	Brian Eno, David Byrne, Jerry Harrison	2:47
3.	"I Don't Depend on You"	Ian Craig Marsh, Martyn Ware, Philip Oakey	5:26
4.	"I Burn for You"	Sting	6:00

Side B
No.	Title	Writer(s)	Length
5.	"Geisha Boys and Temple Girls"	BEF, Gregory	4:30
6.	"Morale"	Marsh, Ware, Oakey	3:05
7.	"Word Before Last"	Marsh, Ware, Oakey	3:58
8.	"Circus of Death"	Marsh, Ware, Oakey	6:57

== Personnel ==
- Engineer - Nick Patrick, Peter Walsh (tracks: A1)
- Lead vocals [soloist] - Alison Hierlehy (tracks: B3), Floyd (tracks: B3), Kim Leeson (tracks: A1, A4, B1), Richard Lloyd King (tracks: A2, B1, B4), Roy Gale (tracks: A3, A4, B4)
- Producer - British Electric Foundation, (tracks: A1, A3 to B4)
- Producer - Geoff Westley (A2)
- Synthesizer [Roland Jupiter 4, Roland System 100, Synclavier Ii], electronic drums [Linn drum computer] - Ian Craig Marsh, Martyn Ware
- Piano - Steve Travell (A1)
- Guitar, bass - John Wilson (A3)
- Drums - Simon Phillips (B1)
