= Naked as Advertised =

Studio album by Heaven 17
- Released: 2008
- Genre: Synth-pop
- Length: 44:40
- Label: Just Music
- Producer: Martyn Ware

Heaven 17 chronology
Before After (2005)	Naked as Advertised (2008)

Naked as Advertised is the eighth studio album by the English synth-pop band Heaven 17. It was originally released in 2008, on the label Just Music, three years after their previous studio album, Before After. The album contained re-workings of tracks such as "Temptation" along with versions of Martyn Ware songs best known from his time with the Human League, including "Being Boiled" and "Empire State Human", as well as a cover of The Associates' hit "Party Fears Two". Following the departure of Ian Craig Marsh in 2007, this is the first Heaven 17 album with the band consisting of the duo of Glenn Gregory and Ware.

== Track listing ==
1. "Being Boiled" – 4:52
2. "Geisha Boys and Temple Girls" – 4:23
3. "Temptation" (featuring Billie Godfrey) – 3:47
4. "Penthouse and Pavement" – 4:23
5. "Party Fears Two" – 6:32
6. "Don't Fall" – 5:19
7. "(We Don't Need This) Fascist Groove Thang" – 3:33
8. "We Live So Fast" – 3:56
9. "Empire State Human" – 4:02
