= I Don't Depend on You =

Single by "The Men" a.k.a. the Human League
- B-side: "Cruel"
- Released: July 1979
- Recorded: Monumental Studios, Sheffield, UK
- Genre: Europop; art pop; disco
- Length: 4:36
- Label: Virgin Records
- Songwriters: Philip Oakey, Martyn Ware, Ian Craig Marsh
- Producer: Colin Thurston

The Human League singles chronology
"Being Boiled" (1978)	"I Don't Depend on You" (1979)	"Empire State Human" (1979)

Audio sample
- file; help

"I Don't Depend on You" is a disco-influenced song by the British synth-pop group the Human League released under the pseudonym The Men. It was released as a single in the UK in July 1979, but failed to chart. It was written by Philip Oakey, Martyn Ware and Ian Craig Marsh; was produced by Colin Thurston and featured guest backing vocalists Katie Kissoon and Lisa Strike (who later worked with Pink Floyd).

After hastily signing the Human League in 1978 it became apparent to Virgin Records that the band were not very profitable, with none of their releases under Fast Records making any impact on the charts. Virgin began putting pressure on the group to justify their large advance signing fee. Pressure was put on Ware, Oakey and Marsh to abandon their no traditional instruments rule and use conventional instruments in an attempt to be more commercial and sell more records. Ware reluctantly agreed but insisted that any material recorded this way should be released under a pseudonym to ensure that it wasn't confused with the pure electronic sound of the Human League. "I Don't Depend on You" was the only product of this compromise with Virgin. It was recorded with the addition of session musicians and was released under the name The Men. The song also features the synth riff from debut single Being Boiled towards the end of the track. Afterwards the band were able to record tracks in their original style for Virgin. Before any further conventional style records could be recorded, the original Human League had split; Oakey then took the new reformed band down a different commercial and pop route.

Later, it would be commented on that in recording "I Don’t Depend on You" – two years prior to the arrival of schoolgirl vocalists Susan Ann Sulley and Joanne Catherall – Oakey, Ware and Marsh had already produced a Human League Mk 2-style track complete with commercial pop sound: Oakey's vocal with female backing (with Katie Kissoon and Lisa Strike providing the backing vocals).

NME commented on this in 1990:

Utterly commercial, the irritating bleep-content is all but lost under lashings of catchy Euro-Pop sheen (with prophetic female backing to boot). The HL were quite clearly ahead of their own time, never mind anyone else’s."

The B-side, titled "Cruel", is simply a remix of "I Don’t Depend on You" without Oakey's vocals. "I Don’t Depend on You" received little promotion or airplay and did not chart. Re-releases on albums now credit the track as The Human League a.k.a. 'The Men'.

== Hot Gossip version ==
British dance troupe Hot Gossip released a cover this song in February 1982 as a single from their album Geisha Boys and Temple Girls which was produced by Martyn Ware. The album and single were commercial failures. The single was Dindisc DIN-39 and was the last Dindisc release.
