= Reproduction (album) =

Studio album by the Human League
- Released: 5 October 1979
- Studio: Workshop Studio in Sheffield
- Genre: Synth-pop; electropop; art pop; synth-punk
- Length: 43:33
- Label: Virgin
- Producer: The Human League, Colin Thurston

The Human League chronology
| Reproduction (1979) | Travelogue (1980) |

Professional ratings
Review scores
| Source | Rating |
|---|---|
| AllMusic | 3/5 stars |
| The Great Rock Discography | 5/10 |
| Muzik | 4/5 stars |
| Q | 4/5 stars |
| Record Mirror | 3/5 stars |
| The Rolling Stone Album Guide | 1.5/5 stars |
| Smash Hits | 8/10 |
| Sounds | 5/5 stars |
| Spin Alternative Record Guide | 2/10 |
| Uncut | 4/5 stars |

Reproduction is the debut studio album released by the English synth-pop group the Human League. The album was released on 5 October 1979 by Virgin Records.

== Overview ==
Reproduction contains nine tracks of electronic and synth-pop with some elements of industrial music, and was recorded during six weeks at The Human League's studio in Sheffield. The recordings were co-produced by Colin Thurston, who had previously worked on some key recordings such as Iggy Pop's Lust for Life (1977) and Magazine's Secondhand Daylight (1979), and who went on to produce numerous hit albums of the 1980s, most notably for Duran Duran. The album also includes a cover version of "You've Lost That Lovin' Feelin'", a 1964 hit for The Righteous Brothers.

== Artwork ==
The cover shows the feet of a man and two women seemingly standing above a number of naked babies. This was at the instruction of the band, but band member Martyn Ware described how the band's brief was misinterpreted by the record company's art department:

"We said we wanted an image of a glass dancefloor in a discotheque which people were dancing on and beneath this, a lit room full of babies. It was meant to look like a still from a film – like some kind of dystopian vision of the future – but it just looks like they're treading on babies. We were quite upset but at that time, it was too late to change it."

== Commercial performance ==
The album's initial release in October 1979 was a commercial failure, but it was re-issued and entered the charts almost two years later in August 1981, earning a Silver disc by the end of the year and peaking at #34 in early 1982. The album spent a total of 23 weeks in the album chart and was certified Gold by the BPI in 1988.

The only single released from the album was "Empire State Human" which initially failed to chart. It was re-released in June 1980 (with a free single taken from the band's second album, Travelogue) and reached #62. The band's first single from 1978, "Being Boiled", was not included on the original release of Reproduction, but was added as an extra track on all CD issues from the late 1980s onwards. However, a re-recorded version of that single's B-side, "Circus of Death", was included on the album.

== Reception ==
Trouser Press felt it "suffers from a simplistic approach – high-tech primitivism – given added monotony by Oakey's frequently deadpan vocals" but saw "Empire State Human" as a hint towards the band's commercial fortunes that they would embrace in later years. John Bush of AllMusic gave it a mixed review, finding it had "rigid tracks that revealed a greater lack of humanity than even Kraftwerk" saying it "could well be the most detached synth pop record ever released".

== Track listing ==
All tracks are written by Ian Craig Marsh, Martyn Ware and Philip Oakey, except where indicated.

| No. | Title | Writer(s) | Length |
|---|---|---|---|
| 1. | "Almost Medieval" | | 4:43 |
| 2. | "Circus of Death" | | 3:55 |
| 3. | "The Path of Least Resistance" | | 3:33 |
| 4. | "Blind Youth" | | 3:25 |
| 5. | "The Word Before Last" | | 4:04 |
| 6. | "Empire State Human" | | 3:17 |
| 7. | "Morale...You've Lost That Loving Feeling" | Marsh; Ware; Oakey; Barry Mann; Cynthia Weil; Phil Spector | 9:39 |
| 8. | "Austerity/Girl One" (medley) | | 6:44 |
| 9. | "Zero as a Limit" | | 4:13 |
| Total length: | | | 43:33 |

CD bonus tracks
| No. | Title | Length |
|---|---|---|
| 10. | "Introducing" | 3:19 |
| 11. | "The Dignity of Labour Part 1" | 4:22 |
| 12. | "The Dignity of Labour Part 2" | 2:53 |
| 13. | "The Dignity of Labour Part 3" | 3:56 |
| 14. | "The Dignity of Labour Part 4" | 3:52 |
| 15. | "Flexi Disc" | 4:11 |
| 16. | "Being Boiled" (Fast version) | 3:54 |
| 17. | "Circus of Death" (Fast version) | 4:38 |
| Total length: | | 31:05 (74:38) |

"Introducing" was originally the B-side of the "Empire State Human" single. The master tape of this recording was probably lost since a digitized vinyl recording was used for the CD. "The Dignity of Labour", a set of instrumental pieces, had been released as an EP in 1979. Early copies of the EP included a free flexidisc featuring the track here titled "Flexi Disc", a tongue-in-cheek in-studio meta-conversation between the members of the band and their manager, Bob Last, about the disc itself and what to put on it. The last two tracks were the A- and B-sides of the band's first single, "Being Boiled", described as "Fast versions" in reference to Fast Product, the label on which they were released. The included version of "Circus of Death" is shorter than the original single version, omitting the spoken end of the song.

The original LP album included some musique concrète-style vocal recordings, seemingly from the radio or television, between some tracks. Of note, "knit one, purl one" could be heard on side one. These elements were not included in subsequent CD reissues.

== Personnel ==
The Human League

- Philip Oakey – vocals, synthesizer
- Ian Craig Marsh – vocals, synthesizer
- Martyn Ware – vocals, synthesizer
- Philip Adrian Wright – film technician

== Charts ==
| Chart (1981–1982) | Peak position |
|---|---|
| UK Albums (OCC) | 34 |

== Certifications ==
| Region | Certification | Certified units/sales |
|---|---|---|
| United Kingdom (BPI) | Gold | 100,000^{^} |
^{^} Shipments figures based on certification alone.
