= Don't Fall =

Don't Fall may refer to:

- "Don't Fall", song by post-punk band the Chameleons Script of the Bridge 1983
- "Don't Fall", song by Heaven 17 from Naked as Advertised 2008
- "Don't Fall", song by Steve Hackett from Feedback 86
- "Don't Fall", song by White Lies from Friends (White Lies album)
