= Play to Win =

Play to Win may refer to:

== Music ==
- Play to Win (musical), a 1989 musical about Jackie Robinson

=== Albums ===
- Play to Win (Gabrielle album) or the title song, 2004
- Play to Win: The Very Best of Heaven 17, by Heaven 17, 2012

=== Songs ===
- "Play to Win", by Al Green from I Can't Stop, 2003
- "Play to Win", by the Clash from Cut the Crap, 1985
- "Play to Win", by Heaven 17 from Penthouse and Pavement, 1981
- "Play to Win", by Hinder from The Reign, 2017

== Television ==
- Play to Win, a syndicated sports show hosted by Bob Neal
- "Play to Win", a 2015 episode of Survivor: Cambodia

== See also ==
- I Play to Win, a 1971 book by Freddie Joe Steinmark
