= The Luxury Gap =

Studio album by Heaven 17
- Released: 25 April 1983
- Studios: AIR (London); Townhouse (London)
- Genres: Synth-pop; electropop; new wave; disco; electronic
- Length: 37:39
- Label: Virgin
- Producers: British Electric Foundation; Greg Walsh

Heaven 17 chronology
Penthouse and Pavement (1981)	The Luxury Gap (1983)	How Men Are (1984)

Singles from The Luxury Gap
- 1. "Let Me Go" Released: 22 October 1982; 2. "Temptation" Released: 8 April 1983 (UK/Europe only); 3. "We Live So Fast" Released: 8 April 1983 (US only); 4. "Come Live with Me" Released: 17 June 1983; 5. "Crushed by the Wheels of Industry" Released: 29 August 1983

The Luxury Gap is the second studio album by the English synth-pop band Heaven 17, released on 25 April 1983 by Virgin Records. It is the band's best-selling studio album, peaking at number 4 on the UK Albums Chart – eventually becoming the 17th best-selling album of the year – and being certified platinum (300,000 copies sold) by the BPI in 1984.

In contrast to Heaven 17's debut studio album Penthouse and Pavement (1981), the singles from The Luxury Gap charted strongly, particularly "Temptation", which reached No. 2 on the UK singles chart and was the 34th biggest selling single of 1983. Other hits included "Come Live with Me" (UK No. 5) and "Crushed by the Wheels of Industry" (UK No. 17).

== Recording ==
The Luxury Gap was recorded at AIR Studios on Oxford Street in the West End of London with co-producer Greg Walsh. It was recorded under the working title Ashes and Diamonds. The band's ambition was to combine their love of soul music with electronic music. Soul music was a particularly strong influence on the vocal arrangements, most notably on the song "Temptation", which became a hit single. Virgin Records did not require the band to work on a budget, which allowed them to write in the studio and to use the studio as a musical tool, creating complex and detailed arrangements and have three songs orchestrated.

Numerous synthesizers and electronics were utilized to create the album, among which include the Linn LM-1 and Roland TR-606 drum machines, the Roland TB-303 bass synthesizer, and the Roland Jupiter-8, Roland System-100M and Fairlight CMI synthesizers.

== Critical reception ==
Professional ratings
Review scores
Source	Rating
AllMusic	4.5/5 stars
Christgau's Record Guide	B+
Classic Pop	4/5 stars
Mojo	4/5 stars
PopMatters	5/10
Record Collector	4/5 stars
Record Mirror	4/5 stars
Rolling Stone	4/5 stars
Smash Hits	8 1/2/10
Sounds	2/5 stars

In a retrospective review, AllMusic critic Dan LeRoy called The Luxury Gap "one of the seminal albums of the British new wave", highlighting its "undreamed-of range" and music, which "showed just how warm electro-pop's usually chilly grooves could be".

== Live performances ==
Heaven 17, in their current line-up of keyboardist Martyn Ware and lead vocalist Glenn Gregory, performed all of The Luxury Gap on 14 October 2011 at the Roundhouse in Chalk Farm, north west London. The band performed the album using "3D sound" technology developed by Ware's Illustrious Company. The show was a sequel of sorts to the Penthouse and Pavement concerts the band played in 2010.

A new deluxe edition of the album in 2012 was promoted with a tour of the UK in October and November, followed by some December dates in Germany and Belgium. The band played the original album in its entirety, followed by a selection of Heaven 17 tracks and two Human League tracks: "A Crow and a Baby" and "Being Boiled". A cover version of the Righteous Brothers' 1964 song "You've Lost That Lovin' Feelin'", similar to the one recorded by the Human League in 1979, and a cover version of the Associates' 1982 song "Party Fears Two" were also performed.

To commemorate the 35th anniversary of The Luxury Gap's release, Heaven 17 toured the UK from November to December 2018, again performing the album in full. And did the same again for its 40th anniversary in 2023.

== Track listing ==
All songs written and composed by Glenn Gregory, Ian Craig Marsh, and Martyn Ware.

Side one

1. "Crushed by the Wheels of Industry" – 5:54
2. "Who'll Stop the Rain" – 3:04
3. "Let Me Go" – 4:23
4. "Key to the World" – 3:42

Side two

5. "Temptation" – 3:34
6. "Come Live with Me" – 4:18
7. "Lady Ice and Mr Hex" – 3:46
8. "We Live So Fast" – 3:49
9. "The Best Kept Secret" – 5:09

The US Arista issue of the album omitted "Who'll Stop the Rain" and "Let Me Go", both of which had appeared on a US-only release titled Heaven 17 (featuring most tracks from Penthouse and Pavement) in 1982. They were replaced with re-recorded versions of "Let's All Make a Bomb" and "Song with No Name" (from Penthouse and Pavement, and released as B-sides in the UK).

2006 remastered edition bonus tracks

10. "Let Me Go" (extended mix) – 6:22
11. "Who'll Stop the Rain (Dub)" – 6:15
12. "Crushed by the Wheels of Industry (Parts 1 and 2)" – 6:59
13. "Come Live with Me" (12" version) – 4:34

== Personnel ==
Credits are adapted from the album's liner notes.

Heaven 17

- Glenn Gregory – lead vocals, backing vocals
- Martyn Ware – synthesizer programming, Linn LM-1 drum machine, backing vocals, arrangements
- Ian Craig Marsh – synthesizer programming, arrangements

Additional musicians

- Nick Plytas – grand piano (1, 3, 7)
- Greg Walsh – acoustic piano and synthesizer programming (1, 4), arrangements
- John Wilson – guitars and guitar synthesizer (1, 2, 3, 7)
- Ray Russell – guitars and guitar synthesizer (2, 4, 6)
- Simon Phillips – drums and percussion (7, 9)
- Don Myrick – saxophones
- Louis Satterfield – trombone
- Michael Harris – trumpet
- Rahmlee Michael Davis – trumpet
- John Barker – orchestra arrangements and conductor (5, 6, 9)
- Sarah Gregory – "screams" (2)
- Carol Kenyon – backing vocals (4, 5)

Production

- Ian Craig Marsh – producer, engineer
- Martyn Ware – producer, engineer
- Greg Walsh – producer, engineer
- Ray Smith – cover concept, painting

== Charts ==
=== Weekly charts ===
Weekly chart performance for The Luxury Gap
Chart (1983)	Peak position
Australian Albums (Kent Music Report)	53
Canada Top Albums/CDs (RPM)	58
Dutch Albums (Album Top 100)	20
Finnish Albums (Suomen virallinen lista)	13
German Albums (Offizielle Top 100)	7
New Zealand Albums (RMNZ)	11
Swedish Albums (Sverigetopplistan)	17
UK Albums (Official Charts)	4
US Billboard 200	72

=== Year-end charts ===
Year-end chart performance for The Luxury Gap
Chart (1983)	Position
German Albums (Offizielle Top 100)	42
UK Albums (Gallup)	17

== Certifications ==
Certifications for The Luxury Gap
Region	Certification	Certified units/sales
United Kingdom (BPI)	Platinum	300,000^{^}
^{^} Shipments figures based on certification alone.
