= Come Live with Me =

Come Live with Me may refer to:

- Come Live with Me (film), a 1941 American romantic comedy film
- "Come Live with Me" (Heaven 17 song), 1983
- "Come Live with Me" (Roy Clark song), 1973

== See also ==
- "The Passionate Shepherd to His Love", a 16th-century poem by Christopher Marlowe that begins with these words
