= Playing to Win =

Playing to Win may refer to:

== Music albums ==
- Playing to Win (Little River Band album), 1985, or the title track
- Playing to Win (Rick Nelson album), 1981
- Playin' to Win, a 1978 album by Outlaws

== Business strategy ==
- Playing to Win, a strategy framework championed by Roger Martin

== See also ==
- Play to Win (disambiguation)
