= Temptation (Heaven 17 song) =

1983 single by Heaven 17

Single by Heaven 17

from the album The Luxury Gap
- B-side: "We Live So Fast", "Who'll Stop the Rain"
- Released: 8 April 1983
- Recorded: 1983
- Genre: Synth-pop; disco
- Length: 3:34 (album version); 3:08 (7-inch version); 4:37 (12-inch version)
- Label: Virgin
- Songwriters: Glenn Gregory; Ian Craig Marsh; Martyn Ware
- Producers: B.E.F.; Greg Walsh

Heaven 17 singles chronology
"Let Me Go" (1982)	"Temptation" (1983)	"We Live So Fast" (1983)

Music video
- "Temptation" on YouTube

Alternative cover
- 1992 re-release: Brothers in Rhythm Remix

"Temptation" is a single by the English synth-pop band Heaven 17 featuring Carol Kenyon, originally released on 8 April 1983, by Virgin Records, peaking at number two on the UK singles chart. This was the second single to be taken from their second studio album, The Luxury Gap (1983), after "Let Me Go" in November 1982. It was written by Glenn Gregory, Ian Craig Marsh and Martyn Ware, and produced by B.E.F. with Greg Walsh. The music video for the song was directed by the Irish-British filmmaker Steve Barron. "Temptation" was certified silver by the BPI in May 1983, for sales exceeding 250,000 copies, subsequently listed by the Official Charts Company as the 34th best-selling single of 1983 in the UK.

== Composition and recording ==
Martyn Ware explained the subject matter of the song "Temptation" as "I woke up one morning and thought I've got to write a song about sex, I've never written a song about sex. So the song is about rising sexual tension; it has chords that keep going up like an [M. C.] Escher staircase and in the end there's this big release." Glenn Gregory later recalled that he laughed "when Martyn walked in and said he had this great idea for a song based on the Lord's Prayer with a never-ending chord structure" (the line "lead us not into temptation" is taken from the Lord's Prayer).

Carol Kenyon provided guest vocals on the recording and continued to work with the band on their studio albums Pleasure One (1986) and Teddy Bear, Duke & Psycho (1988). The song featured a 23-piece orchestra, the instrumentation was single woodwind (flute, oboe, clarinet, bassoon, saxophone) brass quintet (2 B flat trumpets, 2 French horns, 2 tenor trombones, E flat tuba), Harp and strings (4 violins, 2 violas, 3 cellos, 1 double bass) arranged and conducted by John Wesley-Barker, which was also featured on the single "Come Live with Me" and a third track, "The Best Kept Secret", on the parent album The Luxury Gap. In a 2016 interview, Ware said that he told Wesley-Barker that he wanted the arrangement to be "sweeping and expressionistic", giving the theme from The Big Country as an example of the kind of sound required.

== Performance ==
Heaven 17 performed this song on Top of the Pops' 1000th edition in 1983.

== Critical reception ==
Upon its release, the song was poorly received by Smash Hits reviewer Dave Rimmer who wrote: "The boys from the BEF seem hell-bent on making brilliant disco records. Unfortunately this isn't one of them. They've got all the right ideas, but seem to get them in the wrong order. And the smoochy vocal intro is horrid."

Retrospectively, Record Collector reviewer Daryl Easlea stated in 2012 that "'Temptation' remains the best Northern soul single written in another era", and described it in an earlier review for the BBC as typical of the "superiority" of Heaven 17's "hooks and nuances, fluid funk and sultry soul."

== Remix and re-recording ==
In 1992, the song was remixed by the British electronic music group Brothers in Rhythm and released on 9 November 1992. This version charted at No. 4 on the UK singles chart, and reached No. 1 in the UK Dance Chart. The 1992 remix of "Temptation" was certified silver by the British Phonographic Industry (BPI) in January 1993 for sales exceeding 200,000 copies.

In 2008, the song was re-recorded for Heaven 17's eighth studio album Naked as Advertised with Billie Godfrey as guest vocalist. On 19 October 2010, Heaven 17 performed the song on Later... with Jools Holland on BBC Two in the United Kingdom.

== Music video ==
The music video for "Temptation" was directed by the Irish-British filmmaker Steve Barron. It shows the band dressed in black in drab surroundings in a style of German Expressionism, and has segments of what looks like an abstract office interview between vocalist Glenn Gregory and actress Gillian de Terville (who lip syncs Carol Kenyon's vocals). Kenyon did not appear in the video due to a disagreement over appearance money.

== Personnel ==
Credits are adapted from the album's liner notes.

Heaven 17

- Glenn Gregory – vocals
- Martyn Ware – synthesizers, Linn LM-1 programming, backing vocals, producer
- Ian Craig Marsh – synthesizers, producer

Additional personnel

- Greg Walsh – producer, engineer
- Carol Kenyon – vocals
- John Wesley Barker – orchestral arranger and conductor

== Charts ==
=== Weekly charts ===
Original version

Chart (1983)	Peak position
Australia (Kent Music Report)	38
France (SNEP)	20
Ireland (IRMA)	3
Netherlands (Dutch Top 40)	27
Netherlands (MegaCharts)	25
New Zealand (Recorded Music NZ)	15
UK Singles (OCC)	2
US Dance Club Songs (Billboard)	34
West Germany (Media Control Charts)	11

Brothers in Rhythm remix

Chart (1992–1993)	Peak position
Australia (ARIA)	64
Europe (European Hit Radio)	36
Germany (Media Control Charts)	42
Ireland (IRMA)	9
Netherlands (Dutch Top 40)	16
Netherlands (Single Top 100)	18
UK Singles (OCC)	4
UK Airplay (Music Week)	5
UK Dance (Music Week)	1
UK Club Chart (Music Week)	1

=== Year-end charts ===
Brothers in Rhythm remix

Chart (1992)	Position
UK Club Chart (Music Week)	37

== Cover versions ==
At the NME Awards 2007, Jarvis Cocker of Pulp and Beth Ditto of Gossip performed "Temptation", and released it as a charity single.

The extreme metal band Cradle of Filth covered the song on their seventh studio album Thornography (2006).

Heaven 17 collaborated on a new performance of the song with La Roux at Maida Vale Studios on 26 January 2010 for BBC 6 Music. At the Glastonbury Festival on 25 June 2010, Glenn Gregory was invited on stage to perform the version again with La Roux during their set.

== References in popular culture ==
"Temptation" was used in the Scottish black comedy drama film Trainspotting (1996), and appears on the second volume of its official soundtrack. It was also used in a 2010 Plusnet advert, where the band were featured in a tongue-in-cheek appearance performing the song.

In September 2024, Ware said Rockstar Games had asked to license "Temptation" for its upcoming video game Grand Theft Auto VI for US$7,500 per writer; Ware countered with an offer for US$75,000 or "a reasonable royalty" but said Rockstar declined. Ware responded "Go fuck yourself", citing the estimated US$8.6 billion revenue earned by the game's predecessor, Grand Theft Auto V. Naomi Pohl, the general secretary of the Musicians' Union, felt Ware's reaction was unsurprising and said the game's high profile would not necessarily translate to higher exposure for the song, noting that "streaming doesn't sustain careers".
