= Honeyroot =

Ambient dance collaboration between Glenn Gregory and Keith Lowndes

- Origin: Sheffield, England
- Genres: Ambient; dance
- Years active: 1997–present
- Label: Just Music
- Members: Glenn Gregory; Keith Lowndes
- Website: honeyroot.com

Honeyroot is an ambient dance collaboration between Glenn Gregory and Keith Lowndes, signed to the independent record label Just Music.

== Career ==
The project had its origins in the 1997 album Skyscraping by ABC. As ABC was essentially Martin Fry, after the departure of founding member Mark White, Lowndes and fellow Sheffield native Gregory of Heaven 17, were brought in for co-songwriting duties on the album.

Lowndes and Gregory's first album, Sound Echo Location, was released in the UK and Australia in 2003 and in the US in 2004.

Honeyroot reached the UK singles chart in May 2005 with their ambient cover version of the Joy Division song "Love Will Tear Us Apart", which also appeared in the Scottish film, Red Road. 2006 saw an online only release entitled "EP1".

The Sun Will Come (2007) featured two singles, the double A-sided "Nobody Loves You (The Way I Do)" b/w "Heavy Drops" and "Where I Belong". Though known primarily as the front man for Heaven 17, Glenn Gregory sings on just two tracks on The Sun Will Come; leaving remaining vocal duties to a variety of female singers including Briony Greenhill ("Nobody Loves You"), Kim Richey, Kerry Shaw, Elsie Wooley and Lindsay Crisp.

== Discography ==
=== Albums ===
- Sound Echo Location (2005), Just Music
- The Sun Will Come (2007), Just Music

=== Singles ===
- "Love Will Tear Us Apart" (2005) – UK No. 70
- "Nobody Loves You (The Way I Do)" / "Heavy Drops" (2010), Just Music
- "Where I Belong"
