= Nick Ashton-Hart =

American international property expert

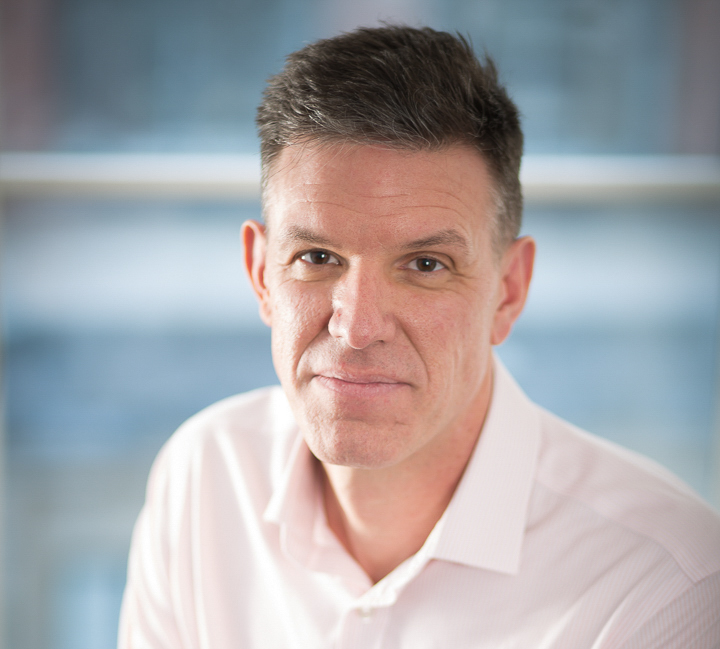
- Nick Ashton-Hart in 2019
- Title: Geneva Representative of the Digital Trade Network (DTN)

Nick Ashton-Hart is the Geneva Representative of the Digital Trade Network (DTN) and represents the ICC United Kingdom on the UK delegation to the meetings of the International Telecommunication Union. He has served in various capacities as the representative of the technology sector to the UN and its member-state delegations in Geneva for more than a decade, including with the Computer & Communications Industry Association (CCIA). Prior to that he was senior director for participation and engagement and director for at-large at the Internet Corporation for Assigned Names and Numbers (ICANN).

He has been the lead negotiator for the 48 European member-state regional grouping in the ITU on various economic issues at ITU meetings from 2011 to the present.

Ashton-Hart has been active in international policy development and intergovernmental negotiations in various areas for more than 25 years, from trade policy as a representative of the private sector to the WTO and as an advisor to the UN Conference on Trade and Development (UNCTAD), was a Member for the Technical Community of the Working Group on Enhanced Cooperation on Public Policy Issues Pertaining to the Internet (WGEC) 2016-2018 convened by the UN General Assembly, sustainable urban development (UN Habitat II Conference, Istanbul, 1996 and preparatory conferences), Intellectual Property (WIPO Standing Committee on Copyright and Related Rights, 2001–2014 and the WIPO Standing Committee on the Law of Patents, 2008–2014), and Internet Governance (at ICANN).

He began his business career as an artist manager for musicians, such as James Brown (in partnership with Frank "Superfrank" Copsidas at Intrigue Music LLc) and Heaven 17, and has served as a director and managing director of various organisations, including executive director of the International Music Managers Forum (IMMF), an international non-governmental organisation representing the interests of music managers and their clients. He retired from artist management in 2004.

Ashton-Hart speaks regularly on international public policy issues, especially related to trade policy, including testifying as an expert witness at the UK House of Commons, at the World Trade Organization's meetings on the digital economy and trade and development. In intellectual property policy he's spoken at events including Digital Hollywood and MusicTank, the Transatlantic Consumers Dialogue (TACD), organs of government such as the Committee on Legal Affairs of the European Parliament, and organs of the United Nations and its specialised agencies, for several years during meetings of the World Intellectual Property Organization on behalf of CCIA.
