= Let Me Go (Heaven 17 song) =

Single by Heaven 17

from the album The Luxury Gap / Heaven 17 (in the US)
- B-side: "Let Me Go (Instrumental)"
- Released: 22 October 1982
- Studio: AIR Studios (London)
- Genre: New wave; synth-pop
- Length: 4:19
- Label: Virgin
- Songwriters: Glenn Gregory; Ian Craig Marsh; Martyn Ware
- Producer: British Electric Foundation

Heaven 17 singles chronology
"The Height of the Fighting (He-La-Hu)" (1982)	"Let Me Go" (1982)	"Temptation" (1983)

Music video
- "Let Me Go" on YouTube

"Let Me Go" (stylised as "Let Me Go!" on the sleeve of the single) is a song by the English synth-pop band Heaven 17, released on 22 October 1982 by Virgin Records as the lead single from their second studio album The Luxury Gap (1983). It reached #41 on the UK singles chart, the lowest chart placement among the singles from that album but their highest at the time of its release.

In 1983, the song also spent five weeks at #4 on the American dance chart and entered the US Billboard Hot 100.

== About the song ==
AllMusic cites the song as "a club hit that features Glenn Gregory's moody, dramatic lead above a percolating vocal and synth arrangement."

Band member Martyn Ware has acknowledged "Let Me Go" as Heaven 17's finest song: "There's a certain sonata form to it as well where it builds and then it dies down towards the end. You end with the same chord as the first chord. It feels like an integrated piece of art to me."

The song was recorded at AIR Studios, Oxford Circus, London, and made heavy use of its expansive facilities; the opening chord of the song, for instance, consists of 118 multi-tracked voices singing in fourteen-part harmony.

"Let Me Go" was one of the first commercial releases to feature the Roland TB-303, a bass synthesiser which would play a pivotal role in the acid house movement that emerged in Chicago and Manchester later in the decade.

== Music video ==
A music video was produced to promote the song. Directed by the Irish-British filmmaker Steve Barron, the video was primarily filmed in black and white, and starts at Lothbury showing a deserted London. Filming also took place at Marylebone station, which was filmed during the night after the station had closed to passenger services. Behind the scenes footage from the filming at the station featured in an edition of the BBC arts series Riverside, which was broadcast on 29 November 1982.

== Critical reception ==
Upon its release, David Hepworth of Smash Hits considered "Let Me Go" to be unremarkable on first hearing, "giving the impression that someone's read a book about dance music and decided to give it a whirl". However, he noted that "after a while a subtle insistence is revealed, at its most potent on the twelve inch version where the interplay between Gregory's grave baritone and a nifty bass line starts to strike sparks." Sunie of Record Mirror described it as "clever and well-crafted as one might expect, and utterly unmemorable". Gavin Martin of the NME was negative in his review, calling it a "depressing song full of mock sorrow and refined angst". He continued, "Glenn Gregory comes on like a caller on LBC Radio's Problem Hour and the group are similarly inspired dragging everything down into the depth of despair with a steamhammer beat, monotonous drones and a melody it would be kind to call ponderous."

== Legacy ==
The song appeared at #81 on Q101 Top 500 Songs of "All Time".

== Personnel ==
Credits are adapted from the album's liner notes and the original single back cover.

Heaven 17

- Glenn Gregory – lead vocals
- Martyn Ware – Roland Jupiter-8, Roland System 100 and Casiotone synthesisers, Linn LM-1 drum machine, backing vocals, producer
- Ian Craig Marsh – Roland TB-303 and System 100 synthesisers, producer

Additional personnel

- Greg Walsh – producer, engineer
- Nick Plytas – piano
- John Wilson – electric guitar

== Formats ==
7" Single

1. "Let Me Go" – 4:19
2. "Let Me Go" (Instrumental) – 4:59

12" Single

1. "Let Me Go" (Extended Version) – 6:14
2. "Let Me Go" (Instrumental) – 4:54

== Appearances in popular culture ==
- "Let Me Go" was the first track heard on the opening episode of That '80s Show.
- The distinctive bassline and drum machine pattern of "Let Me Go" is sampled on "Ce Jeu", a track by the French electronic band Yelle, released in September 2007.

== Charts ==
Chart (1983)	Peak position
Australia (Kent Music Report)	78
Canadian Singles Chart	41
Finnish Singles Chart (Suomen virallinen lista)	24
Irish Singles Chart	26
UK singles chart	41
U.S. Billboard Hot 100	74
U.S. Dance/Club Play Singles	4
U.S. Billboard Mainstream Rock Chart	32
