= Billie Godfrey =

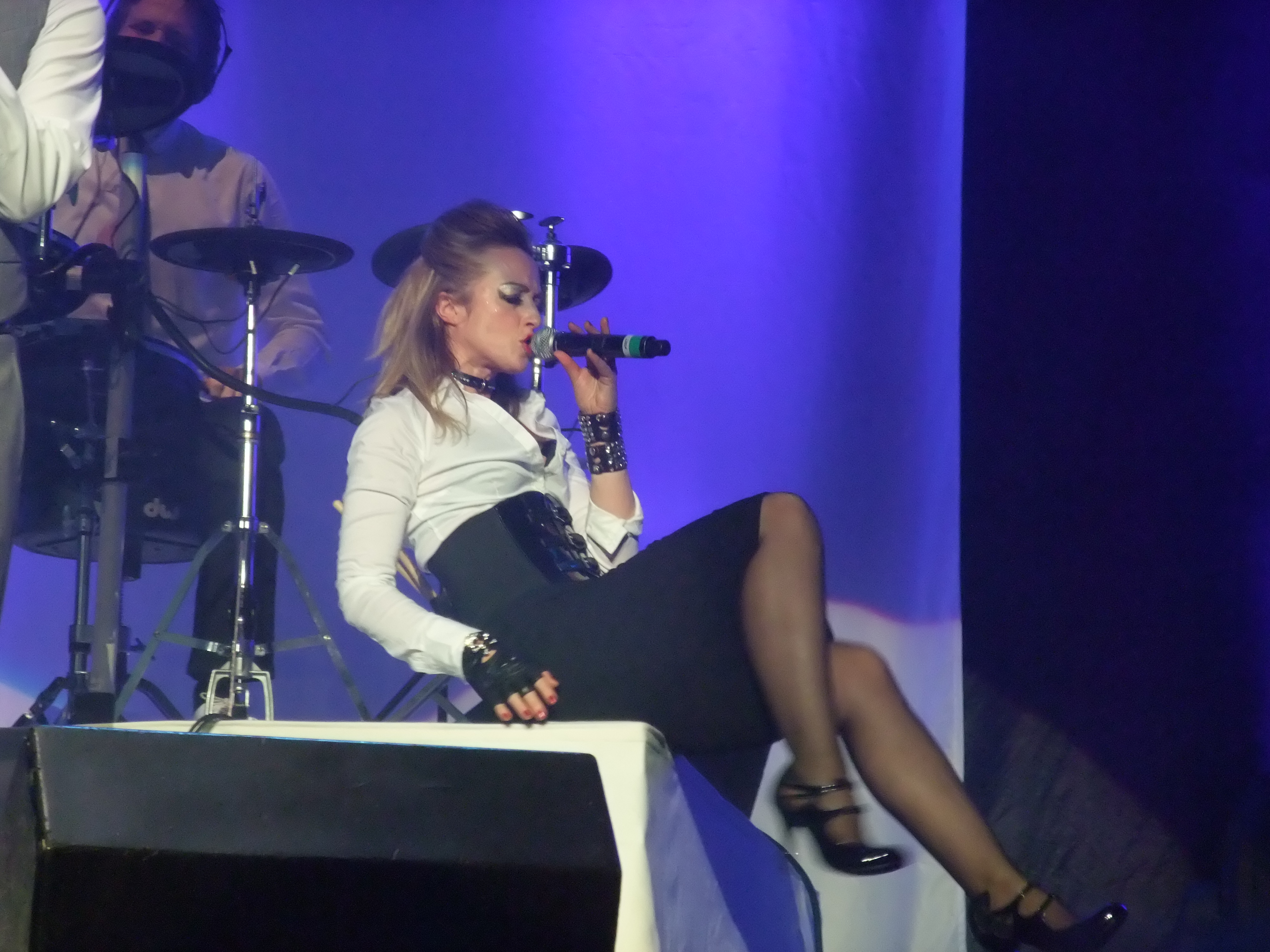
- Godfrey with Heaven 17 in 2008

Background information
- Born: 1968 (age 57–58); London, England
- Genres: Electronic; soul; synth-pop
- Occupation: Singer
- Instrument: Vocals
- Years active: 2000–present
- Label: Various
- Website: billiegodfrey.com

Billie Godfrey is an English singer.

== Background ==
Based in London and Brighton, Godfrey has been a vocalist for many artists and in her own right. She started her career as a radio DJ, playing the kind of music she would later go on to record.

Godfrey writes much of her own material. Her stated influences include Stevie Wonder, Toni Braxton and Aretha Franklin.

She is the first female vocalist from the UK to record an entire album in Japanese on Number One (2001) (JVC/Victor Entertainment Inc).

From the mid-1990s until 2017 Godfrey was one of Heaven 17's resident female vocalists, both in the studio and on tour. She is featured on Heaven 17's studio album Naked as Advertised. On 21 November 2008, she made her first TV appearance with the group, on ITV's Now That’s What I Call 1983 show. She later completed the 2008 'Steel City Tour' where Heaven 17 supported The Human League. Godfrey also frequently supports Beverley Knight as a backing vocalist.

Billie was also a lecturer and vocal tutor at the Brighton Institute of Modern Music.

== Advertising ==
Billie Godfrey appeared in broadband company Plusnet's national TV advertising campaign in 2010 as part of Heaven 17.

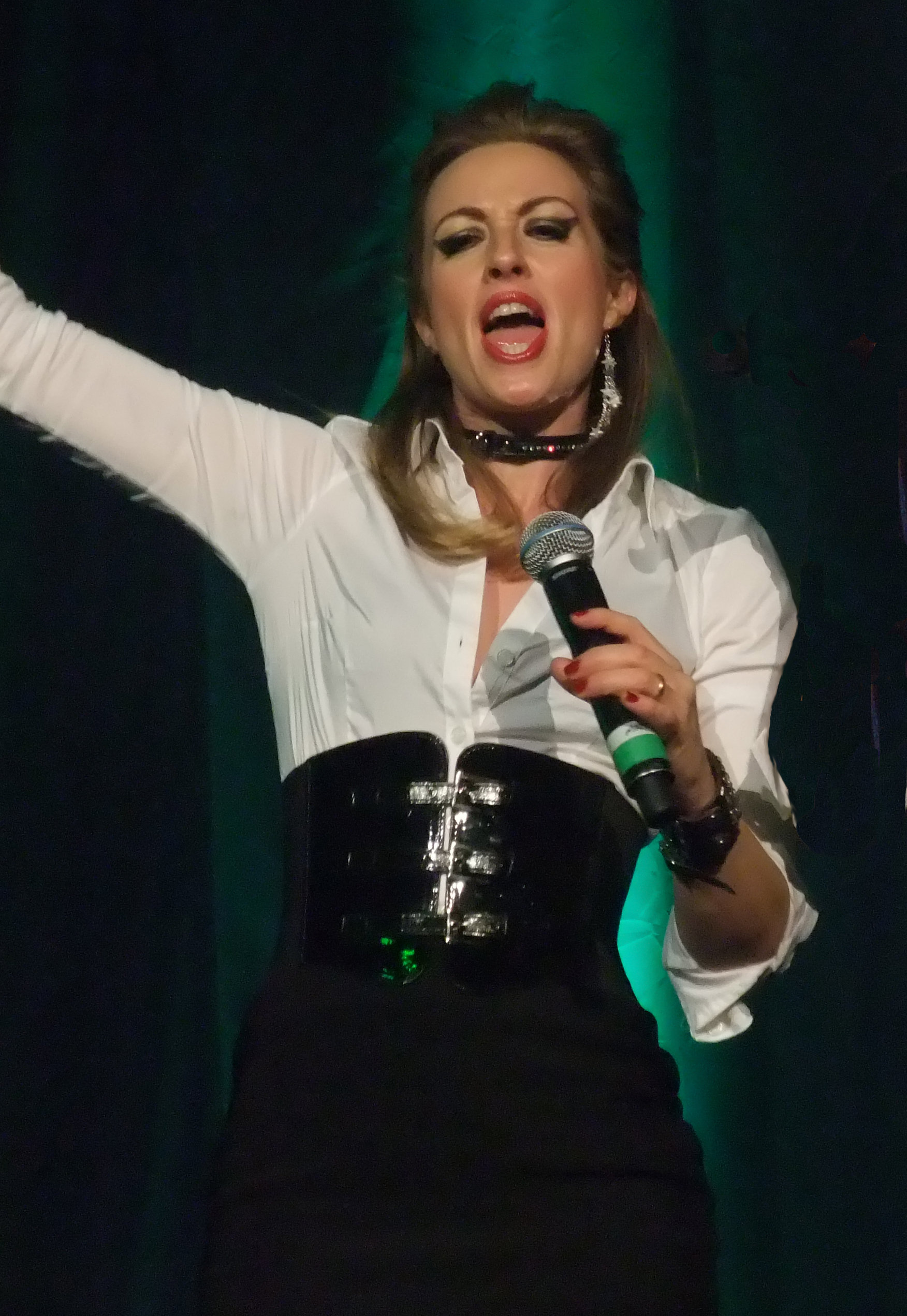
Billie Godfrey on stage in Sheffield, December 2008

== Discography ==
=== Albums ===
- Ready For Love - Pulse-8 Records - 1994
- Number One (CD) - VICP-61461 - 2001
- The Eden Tree - 2009

== Singles and EPs ==
- "This Beat" 6 versions Pulse-8 Records 1994
- "I Love What You Do For Me" (12") Cancan CANIT011 1995
- Boomshanka And Billie Godfrey - "So Hard To Find" (12") Cancan CANIT 010 1995
- D-Ren 1 Feat. Billie Godfrey - "Inside" (12") Ugly Music UGM 006 1996
- Project 2000 Featuring Billie Godfrey - "It's About Time" 5 versions Polydor 2000
- SuReal - "You Take My Breath Away" 2000
- Lazy Grace Feat. Billie Godfrey - "How Deep Is Your Love" (12") Hed Kandi HEDK12001 2003
- Mitchell & Dewbury Featuring Billie Godfrey - "Beyond The Rains" 2 versions Mumo Records 2003
- DiSCOKiNGZ Feat. Billie Godfrey - "FEVER" 1998
