= Come Live with Me (Heaven 17 song) =

Single by Heaven 17

from the album The Luxury Gap
- B-side: "Let's All Make a Bomb (New Version)"
- Released: 17 June 1983
- Genre: Synth-pop; new wave
- Length: 3:35
- Label: Virgin
- Songwriters: Glenn Gregory; Ian Craig Marsh; Martyn Ware
- Producers: British Electric Foundation; Greg Walsh

Heaven 17 singles chronology
"We Live So Fast" (1983)	"Come Live with Me" (1983)	"Crushed by the Wheels of Industry" (1983)

Music video
- "Come Live with Me" on YouTube

"Come Live with Me" is a song by the English synth-pop band Heaven 17, released on 17 June 1983 by Virgin Records as the fourth single from their second studio album The Luxury Gap. It was written by Glenn Gregory, Ian Craig Marsh and Martyn Ware, and produced by Marsh and Ware (British Electric Foundation) with Greg Walsh. "Come Live with Me" peaked at number 5 on the UK singles chart and remained in the top 100 for eleven weeks. It would be the band's last UK top 10 hit until the Brothers in Rhythm remix of "Temptation" in 1992.

== Critical reception ==
On its release, Helen Fitzgerald of Melody Maker felt "Come Live with Me" failed to better the band's previous hit "Temptation", but added that the "moody and sad" song "is still sublime". She described it as "mature", "strong" and "an emotionally wistful relinquishment of lost youth". Max Bell of Number One described it as "an extraordinary choice of single" and added, "After the sublime 'Temptation' this begging letter from an older man to a younger girl seems far too reflective and lyrically top-heavy to strike a common chord." John Shearlaw of Record Mirror felt the single, despite their recent success with "Temptation", "proves that Heaven 17 aren't really in the big league at all". He described the song as "a fine idea (as usual) but one that gets lost entirely with some incredibly clumsy phrasing and unnecessary frippery". Robin Eggar of the Daily Mirror felt the song was not as strong as "Temptation" but predicted "it's good enough to make the top ten".

== Formats ==
7-inch single

1. "Come Live with Me" – 3:35 (remixed version)
2. "Let's All Make a Bomb" (New version) – 5:05

12-inch single

1. "Come Live with Me" (Extended version) – 4:25
2. "Let's All Make a Bomb" (New version) – 5:09
3. "Song with No Name" (New version) – 4:14

== Personnel ==
Credits are adapted from the album's liner notes.

Heaven 17

- Glenn Gregory – vocals
- Martyn Ware – synthesizers, Linn LM-1 programming, backing vocals, producer
- Ian Craig Marsh – synthesizers, producer

Additional personnel

- Greg Walsh – producer, engineer
- Ray Russell – guitars, guitar synthesizer
- John Barker – orchestral arrangement and conductor

== Charts ==
Chart (1983)	Peak position
Australia (Kent Music Report)	100
Irish Singles Chart	7
UK singles chart	5
