= Empire State Human =

Single by The Human League

from the album Reproduction
- B-side: "Introducing" "You've Lost that Loving Feeling" (Dutch Release)
- Released: 12 October 1979; June 1980 (re-release)
- Recorded: Monumental Studios, Sheffield
- Genre: Art pop; electro-punk; electronic rock; glam rock
- Length: 4:36
- Label: Virgin
- Songwriter(s): Philip Oakey, Martyn Ware, Ian Craig Marsh
- Producer(s): The Human League, Colin Thurston

The Human League singles chronology
"I Don't Depend on You" (The Men, 1979)	"Empire State Human" (1979)	"Only After Dark" (1980)

Audio sample
- file; help

"Empire State Human" is a song by the British synth-pop group The Human League. The song was written by Philip Oakey, Martyn Ware and Ian Craig Marsh. It was co-produced by The Human League and Colin Thurston, and recorded at Monumental Studios in Sheffield.

The song was the third single to be released by the original line-up of the Human League, and the only single from the band's 1979 debut album Reproduction. Upon its first release in October 1979, the single failed to chart. However, it was re-released in June 1980 and fared slightly better, reaching number 62 in the UK Singles Chart. For the re-release, Virgin Records included a free copy of the single "Only After Dark" with the first 15,000 copies as a sweetener.

Lyrically, "Empire State Human" is a song about becoming powerful using the analogy of size, with Oakey declaring that he wants to be "tall" 60 times in 3 minutes. Uncut magazine drew a comparison with Oakey's own personal ambition:

"I wanna be tall, tall, tall, as big as a wall, wall, wall". Oakey's Nietzschian pop fantasy reflected his own burgeoning full-on pop ambitions...

The B-side, "Introducing", is an instrumental produced by The Human League. Oakey sang on the original recording but the vocals were not used on the released version.

The open shirted man on the cover artwork is band member Ian Craig Marsh's father.

It was used in the 2012 video game Lollipop Chainsaw in a minigame for the retro stage, and also featured on the game's original soundtrack.

In 2022 the song was used as the intro music on the "Surrender" book tour by U2 front man Bono. It was used again for the show's Broadway run in 2023.
