= Penthouse and Pavement =

Studio album by Heaven 17
- Released: 18 September 1981
- Studios: Townhouse (London); B.E.F.–Maison Rouge (Sheffield); The Garden (London)
- Genres: Synth-pop; electropop; electro-funk; new wave
- Length: 38:12 ¹
- Label: Virgin
- Producers: British Electric Foundation; Richard Manwaring

Heaven 17 chronology
Penthouse and Pavement (1981)	The Luxury Gap (1983)

Singles from Penthouse and Pavement
- 1. "(We Don't Need This) Fascist Groove Thang" Released: 13 March 1981; 2. "Play to Win" Released: 28 August 1981; 3. "Penthouse and Pavement" Released: 30 October 1981; 4. "The Height of the Fighting (He-La-Hu)" Released: 12 February 1982

Penthouse and Pavement is the debut studio album by the English synth-pop band Heaven 17, released on 18 September 1981 by Virgin Records.

"(We Don't Need This) Fascist Groove Thang" was released as a single, but did not achieve chart success, partly due to a ban by the BBC. Despite not generating a major hit single, the album reached no. 14 and spent 77 weeks on the UK Albums Chart. It has since been regarded as "an important outing", is included in the book 1001 Albums You Must Hear Before You Die, and was re-released in 2010 in a three-disc special edition.

== Recording ==
Penthouse and Pavement was recorded at a Sheffield studio, taking shifts with Martyn Ware's and Ian Craig Marsh's earlier band the Human League, who simultaneously recorded their Dare album. Local session musician John Wilson was recruited to play bass and rhythm guitar on the album, which allowed the band to explore a new and more varied sound than the sparse electronic sound they had been restricted to. The title track also features R&B-style female backing vocals by Josie James. The album was divided into two distinctive parts, the "Pavement" side that featured the new funk-influenced sound, and the all-electronic "Penthouse" side. Lyrically the album features political themes such as criticism of capitalism, nuclear warfare and the Cold War arms race.

== Cover artwork ==
The cover of the album features a painting by Ray Smith, depicting the band members as businessmen in suits. Designed by the band and featuring the logo "B.E.F. The New Partnership – That's opening doors all over the world", it was intended as an ironic take on the upcoming yuppie culture and greedy capitalism. Ian Craig Marsh came up with the title "Penthouse and Pavement" and the idea for the cover design from an ad in a business magazine. The cover also features the logo "Heaven 17 Sheffield–Edinburgh–London", which was inspired by a packet of Dunhill cigarettes with a similar logo. The image was a deliberate attempt by Heaven 17 to present themselves as brand rather than a band.

== Reception ==
Professional ratings
Review scores
Source	Rating
AllMusic	4/5 stars
Classic Pop	4/5 stars
Mojo	4/5 stars
PopMatters	8/10
Q	4/5 stars
Record Mirror	3.5/5 stars
The Rolling Stone Album Guide	3/5 stars
Smash Hits	8/10
Sounds	5/5 stars
Uncut	4/5 stars

Whilst its singles charted poorly, Penthouse and Pavement peaked at number 14 on the UK Albums Chart and remained in the top 100 for 77 weeks. It was certified gold (100,000 copies sold) by the BPI in October 1982.

It was well received in the British music press. Reviewing the album for NME, Paul Morley said: "Penthouse and Pavement is fabulous and it won't deny your needs and you just put our faith in it because it is true." It was ranked the fifth-best album of 1981 by NME.

"This is often danceable, always intriguing and sometimes a whole lot more", Dave Rimmer commented in Smash Hits.

Lynden Barber of Melody Maker noted that Heaven 17, with their "alternative dance stance", had produced "some of the most enjoyable, inspiring and intelligent music you're likely to hear this year" and "occupy that rare space in contemporary pop reserved for true originals".

Writing for Record Mirror, Mike Nicholls found the album "a little too rich a mixture in parts", calling it "a pancake which requires more digesting than the entire contents of a Basque patisserie", and advising readers to "tread gingerly and consume at leisure".

In a retrospective review, Dan LeRoy of AllMusic felt that the album combined electropop with good melodies, and that Glenn Gregory was able to deliver the "overtly left-wing political" lyrics without sounding "pretentious".

The album is included in the musical reference book 1001 Albums You Must Hear Before You Die.

== Track listing ==
All tracks are written by Martyn Ware, Ian Craig Marsh, and Glenn Gregory.

Side A ("Pavement")
No.	Title	Length
1.	"(We Don't Need This) Fascist Groove Thang"	4:20
2.	"Penthouse and Pavement"	6:23
3.	"Play to Win"	3:37
4.	"Soul Warfare"	5:04

Side B ("Penthouse")
No.	Title	Length
5.	"Geisha Boys and Temple Girls"	4:33
6.	"Let's All Make a Bomb"	4:03
7.	"The Height of the Fighting"	3:01
8.	"Song with No Name"	3:36
9.	"We're Going to Live for a Very Long Time¹"	3:15
Total length:		38:12

=== Bonus tracks ===
All tracks are written by Martyn Ware, Ian Craig Marsh, and Glenn Gregory, except where noted.

Bonus tracks (1997 US edition)
No.	Title	Length
10.	"I'm Your Money" (extended mix)	5:10
11.	"Play to Win" (extended mix)	7:29

Bonus tracks (2006 remastered edition)
No.	Title	Writer(s)	Length
10.	"Groove Thang" (performed by the B.E.F.)		4:07
11.	"Are Everything" (12″ version)	Pete Shelley	4:28
12.	"I'm Your Money" (12″ version)		5:10
13.	"Decline of the West" (performed by the B.E.F.)	Ware; Marsh	7:17
14.	"Honeymoon in New York/B.E.F. Ident" (performed by the B.E.F., "B.E.F. Ident" unlisted)	Ware; Marsh; Malcolm Veale	2:52

=== 2010 3-disc special edition ===
The album was reproduced live in its entirety in a series of concerts the band held throughout 2010, one of which (in Sheffield) was filmed and shown on BBC Two on 16 May 2010. The following night a documentary about the making of the album was screened; this was later included on a new three-disc special edition of the album released in November 2010.

Disc 1

1. "(We Don't Need This) Fascist Groove Thang"
2. "Penthouse and Pavement"
3. "Play to Win"
4. "Soul Warfare"
5. "Geisha Boys and Temple Girls"
6. "Let's All Make a Bomb"
7. "The Height of the Fighting"
8. "Song with No Name"
9. "We're Going to Live for a Very Long Time"
10. "I'm Your Money" (12″ version)
11. "Are Everything" (12″ version)
12. "Decline of the West"*

Disc 2

1. "Penthouse and Pavement" (original demo)
2. "(We Don't Need This) Fascist Groove Thang" (original demo)
3. "Play to Win" (original demo instrumental)
4. "Soul Warfare" (original demo)
5. "Are Everything" (original demo)
6. "BEF Ident" (alternate version)*
7. "Decline of the West" (alternate version)*
8. "Rise of the East" (alternate version)*
9. "Music to Kill Your Parents By" (alternate version)*
10. "Uptown Apocalypse" (alternate version)*
11. "A Baby Called Billy" (alternate version)*
12. "Rhythmic Experiment 1"*
13. "Rhythmic Experiment 2"*
14. "Boys of Buddha Experiment"*
15. "At the Height of the Fighting" (original rhythm track)
16. "Rhythmic Loop Experiment"*
17. "Funky Experiment"*
18. "Song Experiment"*
19. "Heavy Drum Experiment"*
20. "Play to Win" (original demo with vocals)

^{*} credited to B.E.F.

Disc 3 (DVD)

1. The Story of Penthouse and Pavement (2010 documentary)

== Personnel ==
=== Heaven 17 ===
- Glenn Gregory – lead vocals, backing vocals
- Martyn Ware – pianos, synthesizers, Linn LM-1, percussion, backing vocals
- Ian Craig Marsh – synthesizers, saxophone, percussion

=== Session musicians ===
- The Boys of Buddha – synthetic horns
- Steve Travell – acoustic piano (4)
- John Wilson – guitars (1–4), guitar synthesizers (1–4), bass (1–4)
- Josie James – backing vocals (2)

== Production ==
- Richard Manwaring – co-producer, engineer
- Bob Last – executive producer
- British Electric Foundation – producers, packaging design
- Peter Walsh – production assistant (2–4, 6), engineer (2–4, 6)
- Steve Rance – engineer (5, 7–9)
- Ray Smith – cover painting
- Studios: Virgin Townhouse (London), B.E.F.–Maison Rouge (Sheffield), Garden (London)

== Charts ==
Chart performance for Penthouse and Pavement
Chart (1981–1982)	Peak position
Australian Albums (Kent Music Report)	99
Finnish Albums (Suomen virallinen lista)	18
New Zealand Albums (RMNZ)	45
Swedish Albums (Sverigetopplistan)	24
UK Albums (Official Charts)	14

== Certifications ==
Certifications for Penthouse and Pavement
Region	Certification	Certified units/sales
United Kingdom (BPI)	Gold	100,000^{^}
^{^} Shipments figures based on certification alone.

== In popular culture ==
"Penthouse and Pavement" is featured in the hit 1982 film Night Shift (starring Henry Winkler and Michael Keaton and was included on the film's soundtrack. The song is also included in Rockstar Games video game Grand Theft Auto: Vice City Stories where it is played on the fictional radio station Wave 103.

== Notes ==
- ¹ – The last track on the original vinyl LP release, "We're Going to Live for a Very Long Time", was recorded up to and onto the runoff groove; meaning the runtime of this track (as labelled on the LP sleeve) and the album is infinite, looping the line "For a very long time".
- "Groove Thang", "Decline of the West" and "B.E.F. Ident" originally appeared on the B.E.F. cassette-only release Music for Stowaways (1981).
- All tracks were mixed at Red Bus Studios except "(We Don't Need This) Fascist Groove Thang" and "Let's All Make a Bomb" which were mixed at The Townhouse.
- The Canadian LP and cassette releases included the original version of "I'm Your Money" and an uncredited "B.E.F. Ident" between "Geisha Boys and Temple Girls" and "Let's All Make a Bomb." The cassette's version of "Play to Win" is an edited version of the 12" single mix. This version was later released on the 1986 UK compilation Endless (cassette version only)
