= Naomi Pohl =

British trade union leader

Naomi Pohl is a British trade union leader.

Pohl attended Cranbrook School and then Royal Holloway, University of London. In 2006, she became Assistant General Secretary of the Writers' Guild of Great Britain. She moved to the Musicians' Union in 2009, rising to become National Organiser for Recording and Broadcasting, then Assistant General Secretary for the Music Industry. In 2019, she was elected as the union's Deputy General Secretary, and in the same year was also elected to the executive board of the International Music Council. In 2020, she was listed on Music Week's Women In Music Roll Of Honour.

In 2022, Pohl was elected as general secretary of the union, the first woman to hold the post. On election, she described her top priorities as including improving pay, obtaining better royalties for streamed music and tackling sexual harassment within the music industry.

Trade union offices
Preceded by Horace Trubridge	General Secretary of the Musicians' Union; 2022–present	Succeeded by Incumbent
