= Glenn Gregory =

British singer, songwriter, and multi-instrumentalist

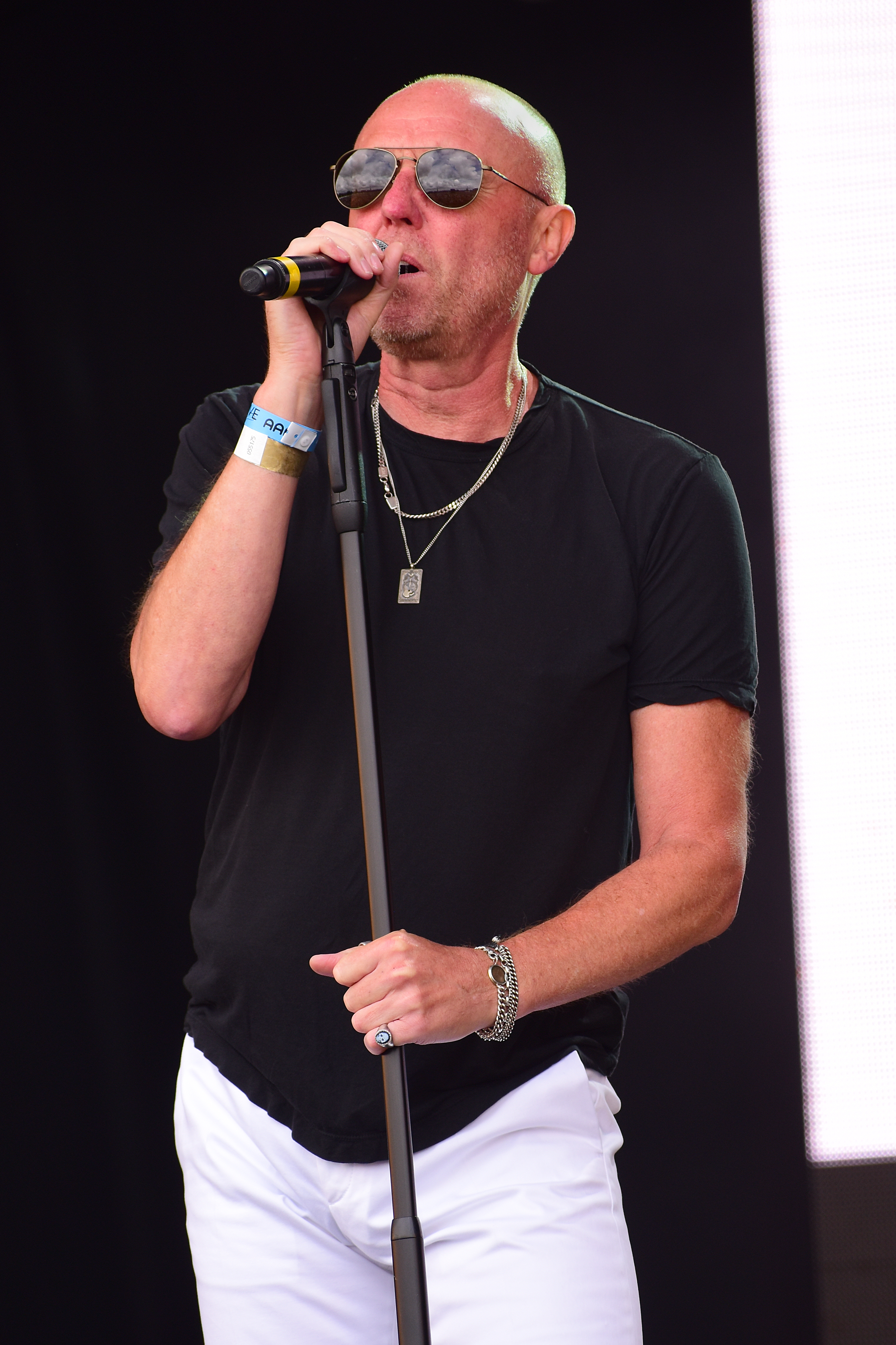
- Gregory performing live with Heaven 17 in Liverpool, 2021

Background information
- Birth name: Glenn Peter Gregory
- Born: 16 May 1958 (age 67)
- Origin: Sheffield, England
- Genres: Synth-pop; electropop; electronic; new wave
- Occupations: Singer; songwriter; multi-instrumentalist
- Instruments: Vocals; guitar; keyboards; saxophone; bass guitar
- Years active: 1973–present
- Labels: Virgin; Just Music
- Member of: Heaven 17; Honeyroot; Holy Holy

Glenn Peter Gregory (born 16 May 1958) is an English singer, songwriter and multi-instrumentalist whose music career spans more than 50 years. He came to prominence in the early 1980s as co-founder and lead vocalist of the new wave and synth-pop band Heaven 17, which released several UK chart hits in the 1980s and 1990s, including "(We Don't Need This) Fascist Groove Thang", "Temptation", "Let Me Go", "Come Live with Me", "Crushed by the Wheels of Industry", "Sunset Now", and "This Is Mine".

== Early years ==
Glenn Peter Gregory was born on 16 May 1958 in Sheffield, England. His father, Howard, was a steel worker. As a teenager, he wanted to be an actor, but he worked in London as a photographer.

== Music career ==
In 1977, Gregory was part of the band 57 Men, formed by Jack Hues and Nick Feldman, who both later formed the band Wang Chung.

Gregory knew the founding members of the Human League for many years. He had been singing and playing bass guitar in bands with Ian Craig Marsh since 1973, and was later also in a short-lived band with Martyn Ware. In early 1981, he was contacted by Martyn Ware after the original incarnation of the Human League broke up, and was asked to join Heaven 17, a new band resulting from the break-up.

The band Heaven 17 included the trio of Martyn Ware, Ian Craig Marsh, and Gregory as lead vocalist. The band released eight studio albums, and had many hits in the UK. However, by the late 1980s their popularity had declined. The band broke up in 1988, but reunited in 1996, and played their first ever live concert in 1997. Marsh left the band in 2007, but Ware and Gregory continue to perform as Heaven 17.

In 1984, Gregory contributed to the Band Aid single "Do They Know It's Christmas?", singing the line "No rain nor rivers flow".

Outside Heaven 17, Gregory has been a member of the bands Ugly and Honeyroot, as well as working with ABC, Tina Turner, Grace Jones, Propaganda, Terence Trent D'Arby, Ultravox, La Roux and John Lydon of Public Image Ltd and the Sex Pistols. He was a member of the "supergroup" Holy Holy. He has also established a career in soundtrack music, writing for radio, TV and film. He creates scores in a private studio built at the bottom of his garden.

== Personal life ==
In 1983, Gregory married the American-born singer Sarah Osborne of the Belgian funk band Allez Allez, but the two divorced after about three years. Gregory then married his second wife Lindsay who works for a design company. The couple have a son, Louis.

== Discography ==
Heaven 17

- Penthouse and Pavement (1981)
- The Luxury Gap (1983)
- How Men Are (1984)
- Pleasure One (1986)
- Teddy Bear, Duke & Psycho (1988)
- Bigger Than America (1996)
- Before After (2005)
- Naked as Advertised (2008)
