= Being Boiled =

1978 single by the Human League

Single by the Human League

from the album Travelogue
- B-side: "Circus of Death"
- Released: 30 June 1978
- Recorded: Sheffield (Yorkshire, England)
- Genre: Synth-pop; electropop; electro-punk
- Length: 3:54 (original recording); 4:22 (Holiday '80/Travelogue re-recording)
- Label: Fast Product (1978, 1982); Virgin (1980)
- Songwriter(s): Philip Oakey; Martyn Ware; Ian Craig Marsh
- Producer(s): The Human League

The Human League singles chronology
"Being Boiled" (1978)	"I Don't Depend on You" (The Men, 1979)

Audio sample
- file; help

"Being Boiled" is a song by the English synth-pop band the Human League. It was composed by Martyn Ware and Ian Craig Marsh, with lyrics by Philip Oakey. "Being Boiled" is strikingly different from and darker than the group's more well-known songs.

"Being Boiled" was released as the Human League's debut single in 1978. It has been re-issued several times since then, becoming a top-10 hit in the United Kingdom in 1982 and in West Germany four years later.

== Background and composition ==
The song was influenced by Kraftwerk, German krautrock such as Can and Neu!, American funk bands Funkadelic and Parliament and the attitudes of punk placed in a different context.

It has a strong bassline, compared to Bootsy Collins. The lyrics, described as "bizarre" and "confused", combine a protest against silk farming with vague mention of Eastern religion - ("Listen to the voice of Buddha/saying stop your sericulture"). In Japan, the sound of bells are referred to as "the voice of Buddha".

The song's music predates Philip Oakey's joining the band. The Future, a band comprising Martyn Ware and Ian Craig Marsh, had just parted company with singer Adi Newton, later of Clock DVA. Needing a new singer, they contacted former schoolmate Philip Oakey, giving him the music to listen to. Two days later he was back, having written the lyrics. "That was the first thing I heard Phil do," Marsh recalled, "and I immediately thought, 'You've definitely got the job.'"

The original version was recorded on a domestic tape recorder, in mono, in an abandoned factory, at a cost of £2.50.

== Different versions ==
"Being Boiled" was first released as a single in 1978 on the Fast Product label.

The band recorded a new version as part of a session for the John Peel radio programme in the summer of 1978. The session was recorded 8 August 1978 and broadcast on 16 August. Among the four songs recorded, "Being Boiled" is the only one which has had an official release.

A totally re-recorded version of "Being Boiled" was included on the band's Holiday '80 EP, which reached number 56 in 1980 and number 46 in 1982. This version was also included on their 1980 Travelogue album, and is also available on the Original Remixes and Rarities compilation album (2005).

A stereo remix of the original mono Fast Product version was released as a single in August 1980 through EMI Records, failing to chart. This stereo remix was then reissued in January 1982, this time reaching Number 6 in the UK Charts, shortly after the band's commercial breakthrough with Dare and "Don't You Want Me". It was later included on their Greatest Hits anthology released in 1988. It has also been released on subsequent greatest hits albums, as well as on CD releases of the band's debut album Reproduction as a bonus track.

The song has also been covered by KMFDM on their 2009 album Blitz.

== Reception ==
The song received a mixed reception among established artists of the time. David Bowie declared it to be "the future of music", but former Sex Pistols singer John Lydon, reviewing the single for the New Musical Express, dismissed the band as "trendy hippies". Peter York in Harper's and Queen cited the cover as an example of "post-modern packaging".

Gary Numan named "Being Boiled" as one of his favourite songs. Andy McCluskey of OMD called it "a great piece of music".

== Track listings ==
7-inch single (1978 Fast Product release)

1. "Being Boiled" (original version)
2. "Circus of Death" (original version)

Holiday '80 EP (Virgin Records release)

1. "Being Boiled" (re-recorded version)
2. "Marianne"
3. "Dancevision"
4. "Rock 'N' Roll"/"Nightclubbing" medley

1980 EMI release and 1982 EMI reissue

1. "Being Boiled" (stereo remix of the original version)
2. "Circus of Death" (stereo remix of the original version)

== Charts ==
=== Weekly charts ===
Chart (1982–1986)	Peak position
Austria (Ö3 Austria Top 40)	17
Europe (European Hot 100 Singles)	88
Ireland (IRMA)	10
UK Singles (OCC)	6
West Germany (GfK)	6

=== Year-end charts ===
Chart (1986)	Position
West Germany (Media Control)	25
