= Martyn Ware =

English musician (born 1956)

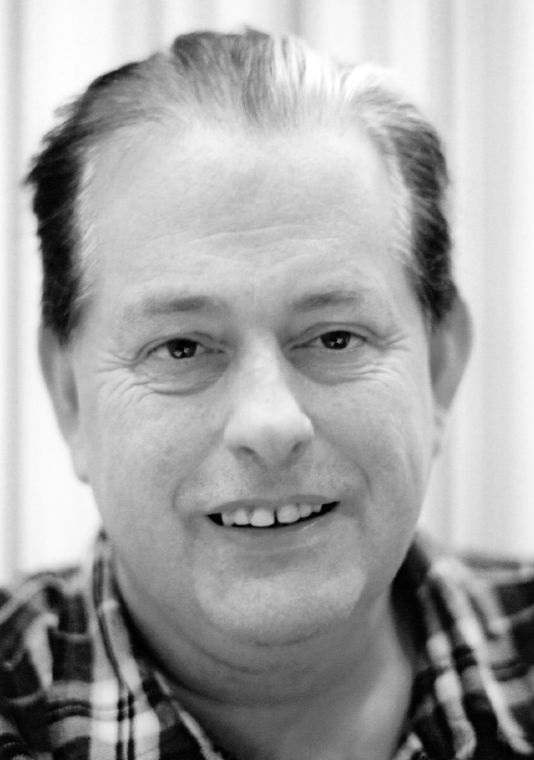
- Ware in 2003

Background information
- Born: 19 May 1956 (age 70)
- Origin: Sheffield, Yorkshire, England
- Genres: Electronic; synth-pop; new wave
- Occupations: Musician; composer; arranger; record producer; music programmer
- Instruments: Vocals; synthesizer; keyboards; Mellotron
- Years active: 1977–present
- Labels: Fast Product; Virgin; Mute
- Formerly of: The Human League; Heaven 17

Martyn Ware (born 19 May 1956) is an English musician, composer, arranger, record producer, and music programmer. As a founding member of both the Human League and Heaven 17, Ware co-wrote hit songs such as "Being Boiled" and "Temptation".

Ware has also worked as a record producer, notably helping to revitalise Tina Turner's career in 1983 with her cover of "Let's Stay Together", and also launching Terence Trent D'Arby's career by co-producing his solo debut, Introducing the Hardline According to... in 1987, while producing Erasure's I Say I Say I Say album in 1994. He is also noted for work in surround sound technology and, more recently, for creation of sound installations.

== Early years ==
Ware was born and grew up in Sheffield, England. After leaving King Edward VII School, he worked in the computer industry. With his first wages, he bought a Korg 700 monophonic keyboard and started experimenting with electronic sound.

== Music career ==
=== The Human League ===
In the 1970s, Ware and synth player Ian Marsh teamed up to play as the Dead Daughters and then as The Future with fellow musician Adi Newton. In 1977, they formed the Human League with vocalist Philip Oakey and soon added Adrian Wright as Director of Visuals to create slide shows for their performances. They recorded a demo and signed with the indie label Fast in 1978. The band had limited commercial success, issuing the albums Reproduction and Travelogue, leading to tensions within the band. Things came to a head with Ware being ejected from the band he had started. In an act of loyalty, Marsh followed him, forming the British Electric Foundation.

=== Heaven 17 ===
The British Electric Foundation was an experimental production project that employed artists including Tina Turner, Sandie Shaw, and Gary Glitter. The band's first album in 1980 was the instrumental cassette-only release Music for Stowaways, followed in 1982 by Music of Quality and Distinction, Vol. 1 which featured vocalist Glenn Gregory. By this time, Ware and Marsh had already teamed with Gregory to form Heaven 17. Their first release was the single "(We Don't Need This) Fascist Groove Thang," which was banned by the BBC. In 1983 they released the hit song "Temptation", which reached number 2 on the music charts. The band went on hiatus in 1988, but reformed in 1990 and released Music of Quality and Distinction, Vol. 2. In 2005, Marsh left the band, but Ware and Gregory continued production.

=== Other projects; Sound installations ===
Ware has collaborated with Vince Clarke (as The Clarke & Ware Experiment) on two music projects; the Pretentious album (1999), and Spectrum Pursuit Vehicle (2001). He has also contributed programmes to Internet radio stations.

For the 2012 Olympics, Ware spearheaded the delivery of Tales from the Bridge, a major commission for the Mayor of London that would traverse the Thames as part of the London 2012 Cultural Olympiad. Collaborators included poet and site-specific writer Mario Petrucci, who created a hybrid script from "literary forms such as short poems, atmospheric descriptions, local anecdotes, facts and figures", and composer Eric Whitacre, whose original score was incorporated in the piece's introduction. The soundscape was active along the Millennium Bridge throughout the Olympics, gaining an estimated four million listeners.

In the late 2000s, Ware also created a touring production called "The Future of Sound", featuring audio-visual artists working on the boundaries between music, art and technology, including United Visual Artists and The Sancho Plan.

Ware also completes sound installations as a "sonic muralist". In 2016 he released an 82-minute soundscape called Sounds of Our Shores, made up of sea coast sound clips sent in by the public.

He curated and produced 'Everything You Can Imagine Is Real' for the UK's National Portrait Gallery in 2017, to coincide with their Picasso Portraits exhibition. The event was inspired by Picasso's circle in Montmartre in the first decade of the 20th century. He arranged for the gallery to become an artists’ colony featuring a wild cross-pollination of ideas, music, poetry, performance, art, film and dance. It included acts as diverse as the Radiophonic Workshop, Scanner, Feral Five and White Noise.

In late 2020 he began a series of podcasts entitled Electronically Yours in which he interviewed various influential figures from the world of music, art, film, comedy and TV that he has encountered during his 40-year career within the industry. Interviewees have included Midge Ure, Peter Hook, Gary Numan and Sandie Shaw.

=== Problem with royalties ===
In September 2024, Ware said Rockstar Games had asked to license "Temptation" for its upcoming video game Grand Theft Auto VI for US$7,500 per writer; Ware countered with an offer for US$75,000 or "a reasonable royalty" but said Rockstar declined. Ware responded "Go fuck yourself", citing the estimated US$8.6 billion revenue earned by the game's predecessor, Grand Theft Auto V. Naomi Pohl, the general secretary of the Musicians' Union, felt Ware's reaction was unsurprising and said the game's high profile would not necessarily translate to higher exposure for the song, noting that "streaming doesn't sustain careers".

=== Surround sound technology ===
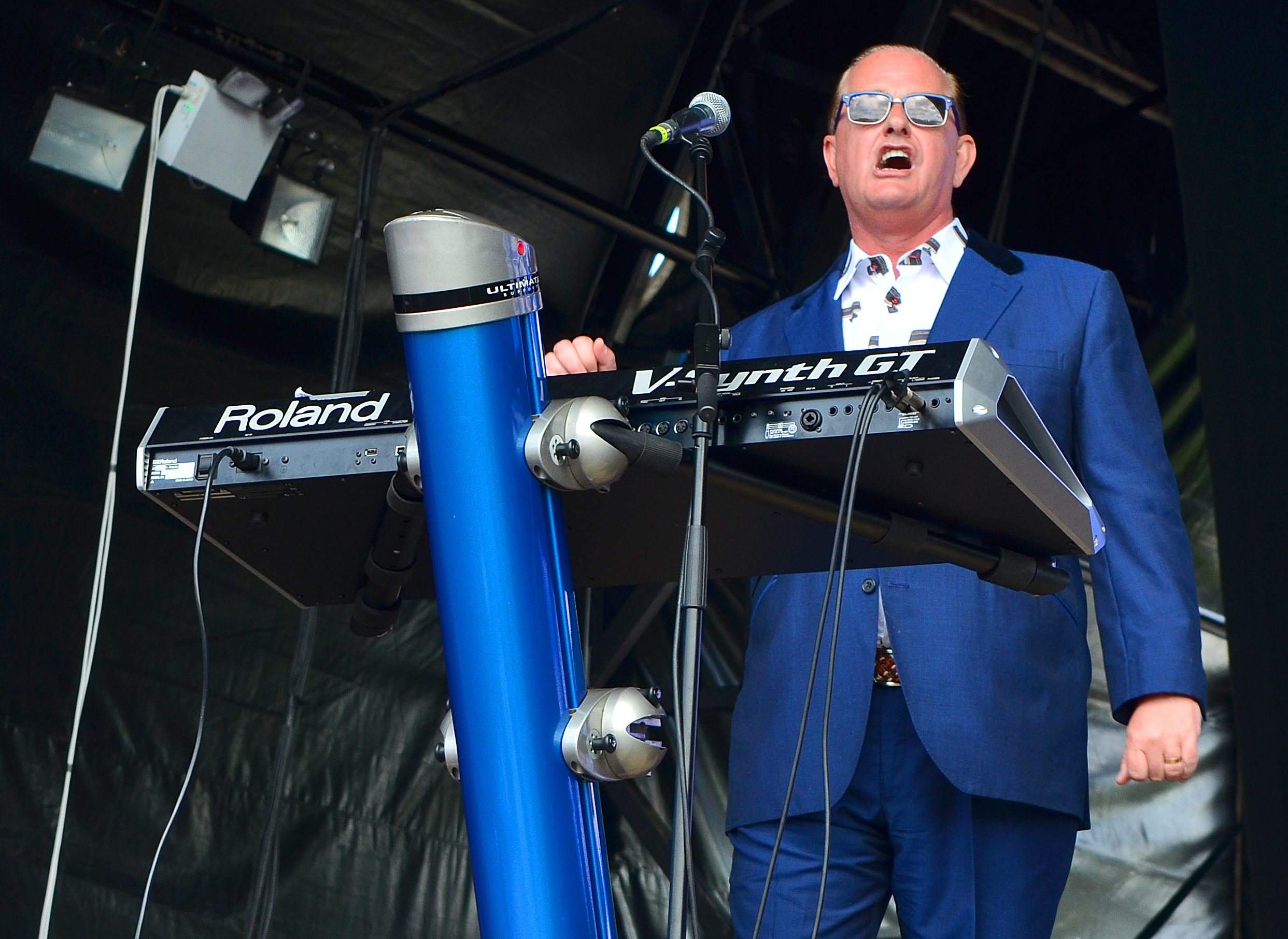
Ware performing with Heaven 17 in 2014

Ware created a 3D surround sound auditorium for the National Centre for Popular Music in Sheffield – a museum of contemporary music and culture, launched with £15 million of National Lottery money, which opened in March 1999 and closed in July 2000. BBC News described the centre as having been "shunned" by visitors, and, despite a £2 million relaunch, the Centre closed. Despite this, Ware later used the surround sound technology to launch an Arts Council subsidised touring project called "The Future of Sound".

Ware's 3D music has also been used in an unusual noise suppression experiment undertaken in Brighton in 2011 on behalf of the Noise Abatement Society (NAS). During this experiment, which was an entry for the John Connell Technology Award, a six-point sound field was created using ethereal sound textures. This was played in the main shopping street in the city, West Street, with the intention of distracting people from the traffic noise.

In the meantime, film made of the street during the time the sound was being produced was analysed by the psychobiologist Harry Witchel to assess whether the ambient sound made any difference to hearers' behaviour. Early results suggested that it did have a beneficial effect for the public both during the day and anecdotal evidence suggested it served as a calming influence during the "clubbers rush" in the evening. Suggestions have been made that the experiment could be rolled out more widely in the future.

=== Honours and awards ===
Ware is a visiting professor at Queen Mary University of London, a member of BAFTA, a Fellow of the Royal Society of Arts, and a founder of 5D – the future of immersive design. In 2012 he received an Honorary Doctorate in Science from the University of London. He received a "Gold Badge Award" from the British Academy of Songwriters, Composers, & Authors (BASCA) in 2017. He was awarded an honorary doctorate from the University of Sheffield in 2022.

=== Podcast ===
In November 2020, Ware launched a podcast, Electronically Yours. It shares the title with his forthcoming autobiography.

== Public speaking ==
Ware speaks regularly on music policy from the perspective of a creative person. His speaking engagements have included: "The future of copyright in Europe" at the British Library on 11 February 2011 for Copyright for Creativity; "The needs of creators, archivists, and educators in transforming creative works" at the European Parliament in Brussels on 14 June 2011; and two outreach events in Brussels in May 2012 in the Library of the European Parliament. He was also a keynote speaker at the Silicon Dreams festival in Leicestershire on 6 July 2013, where he performed with Heaven 17.

== Political views ==
In November 2019, along with 34 other musicians, Ware signed a letter endorsing the Labour Party leader Jeremy Corbyn in the 2019 UK general election with a call to end austerity.

== Personal life ==
Ware is married to Landsley and has two children, Elena and Gabriel.

He is a longtime Sheffield Wednesday supporter.
