= Ian Craig Marsh =

- Born: 11 November 1956 (age 70)
- Origin: Sheffield, South Yorkshire, England
- Genres: New wave; synth-pop; electronic
- Occupations: Musician; composer
- Instruments: Synthesizer; keyboards; saxophone; guitar
- Years active: 1977–2007
- Labels: Fast Product; Virgin

Ian Craig Marsh (born 11 November 1956) is an English musician and composer. He was a founding member of the electronic band The Human League, writing and playing on their first two albums and several singles, until leaving in 1980 to form the British Electric Foundation and later Heaven 17.

== Musical career ==
Marsh began in music at Sheffield's council-sponsored community theatre group Meatwhistle. There he met Mark Civico; they formed a performance art band called Musical Vomit, taking the name from a music paper's hostile review of the band Suicide. Musical Vomit specialised in Alice Cooper-style stunts, such as vomiting soup onstage, and singing about such topics as masturbation and necrophilia.

Marsh played guitar on two shows in 1973 with the band before leaving after his expulsion from school (for being "an undesirable subversive element"). Civico (stage name Trigae Thugg) persevered with Musical Vomit, adding fellow Meatwhistle artists Paul Bower (later of the band 2.3), Glenn Gregory (who went on to become lead singer for Heaven 17) and Ian Reddington, who later found acting fame in EastEnders and Coronation Street.

Musical Vomit mainly played at the Meatwhistle workshop at Holly Street, but during 1974 they also played shows at the Sheffield University Drama Studio and at Burngreave Church Hall, where they gave their only performance of a self-penned rock opera, Vomit Lost in Space, that featured early use of primitive synthesizers. Martyn Ware, a leading figure in The Human League and Heaven 17, was an occasional guest on stylophone but formed a more pop-orientated offshoot of Musical Vomit called Underpants.

Vomit went on to play at the Bath Arts Festival in 1974 and were described by Poly Styrene, who was in the audience, as "the very first punk band".

They were booed by the crowd but remained on stage despite the bombardment of bottles and abuse, although they never played together again. A planned comeback was shelved when percussionist and backing vocalist Ian Reddington was offered a place to study at the Royal Academy of Dramatic Art.

Marsh abandoned the guitar at this time, saying later in an interview with The Face that "they seem a fairly strange instrument... six strings, four fingers, one thumb – it makes no sense."

Instead, he bought a cheap synthesizer, which he struggled to get the most from ("though it made very good motorbike noises") and rejoined Musical Vomit. He had found employment as a computer programmer (as had Ware, though at different companies). Marsh played a key role in the early Sheffield new wave and punk scene by playing the first Ramones album, which he had bought on import, to all his friends.

== The Future ==
In June 1977 Marsh, Ware and vocalist Adi Newton (later of Clock DVA) formed Dead Daughters, a one-off band, to play at a friend's 21st birthday party. The trio enjoyed the performance and decided to stick together as a new band, choosing the name The Future.

The trio set themselves the task of producing pop music using entirely electronic instruments, which in 1977 was virtually unheard of. They also experimented with a computer programme called CARLOS, which converted words fed into it into lyrics. Initially record company interest was limited, and Marsh and Ware decided to remove Newton from the band.

Continuing as a duo they recorded "Dancevision", a short instrumental eventually released on The Human League's Holiday '80 EP. Another track, "Being Boiled", saw Philip Oakey joining the group, and a change of name to The Human League. A collection of demos from this period was released on CD in 2002, entitled The Golden Hour of The Future; it was compiled by Richard X.

== Departure from Heaven 17 ==
Marsh mysteriously disappeared in 2006; even Martyn Ware had to confess to not knowing where he was. Marsh then resurfaced in early 2007 and announced that he no longer wished to perform with Heaven 17. He was notably absent from all their gigs in 2007 and failed to perform with them on The Steel City Tour with the Human League and ABC in late 2008, despite efforts by Ware and Glenn Gregory to get him to return. In an interview in late 2008 Ware conceded that Marsh was no longer an active member of the band. Marsh is now a music teacher.
