= Dalma Pesti =

Hungarian rhythmic gymnast (born 2007)

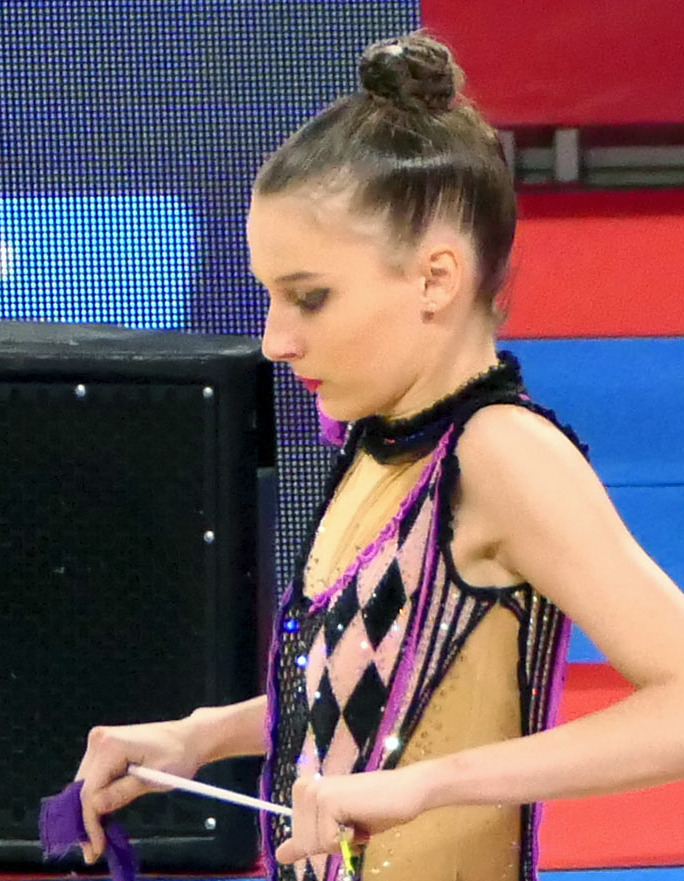
- Pesti in 2024

Personal information
- Nickname: D
- Born: June 18, 2007 (age 19) Telki

Gymnastics career
- Discipline: Rhythmic gymnastics
- Country represented: Hungary; (2023-)
- Club: MTK Budapest
- Head coach: Zsofia Lauber
Medal record
Representing Hungary
Rhythmic gymnastics
Bronze medal – third place	2025 Tallinn	Group All-around
European Cup
Gold medal – first place	2025 Burgas	Cross Battle
Bronze medal – third place	2025 Burgas	5 Ribbons
Bronze medal – third place	2025 Burgas	3 Balls & 2 Hoops

Dalma Pesti (born 18 June 2007) is a Hungarian rhythmic gymnast. She represents Hungary as a member of the senior group.

== Career ==
Pesti took up the sport at age 3 and a half at Óbuda-Kalász RG, two years later she started to take part in competitions.

In August 2023 she was selected to competed at the World Championships in Valencia as part of the national senior group along with Lilla Jurca, Gyöngyvirág Kajner, Mandula Virag Meszaros, Dora Szabados and Monika Urban-Szabo. There they were 16th in the All-Around, 11th with 5 hoops, 21st with 3 ribbons & 2 balls.

In 2025 the Hungarian group debuted at the World Cup in Baku being 9th overall, 10th with 5 ribbons and 10th with 3 balls & 2 hoops. In May competing at the European Cup stage in Burgas along Mandula Virag Meszaros, Monika Urban-Szabo, Dora Szabados, Fruzsina Grek and Julia Farkas, she won bronze with 5 ribbons and with 3 balls & 2 hoops. In early May the group won bronze in the All-Around at the European Championships in Tallinn. In July they competed in the World Cup in Milan, being 11th with 5 ribbon and 7th with 3 balls & 2 hoops. Days later, in Cluj Napoca, they were 13th with 5 ribbons and 7th in the mixed event. In August she was selected, along Julia Farkas, Lilla Jurca, Mandula Virag Meszaros, Dora Szabados and Monika Urban-Szabo, for the World Championships in Rio de Janeiro, taking 16th place in the All-Around, 23rd with 5 ribbons, 7th with 3 balls & 2 hoops and 15th in teams.

In 2026 she made her debut at the World Cup in Sofia, being 10th in the All-Around, 16th with 5 balls and 6th with 3 hoops & 4 clubs. In April the group won a gold and a bronze medal at the Grand Prix in Thiais.
