= Fruzsina Grek =

Hungarian rhythmic gymnast

- Full name: Fruzsina Orsolya Grek
- Born: April 27, 2009 (age 17) Budapest

Gymnastics career
- Discipline: Rhythmic gymnastics
- Country represented: Hungary; (2023-)
- Club: MTK Budapest
- Head coach: Zsofia Lauber
Medal record
Representing Hungary
Rhythmic gymnastics
Bronze medal – third place	2025 Tallinn	Group All-around
European Cup
Gold medal – first place	2025 Burgas	Cross Battle
Bronze medal – third place	2025 Burgas	5 Ribbons
Bronze medal – third place	2025 Burgas	3 Balls & 2 Hoops
Gymnasiade
Bronze medal – third place	2024 Bahrain	Group All-Around
Bronze medal – third place	2024 Bahrain	10 Clubs
Bronze medal – third place	2024 Bahrain	5 Hoops

Fruzsina Grek (born 27 April 2009) is a Hungarian rhythmic gymnast. She represents Hungary as a member of the senior group.

== Career ==
In 2023 Grek was selected to enter the Hungarian junior group along Panni Antal, Boglarka Horvath, Georgina Koszegi-Kohary and Vivien Zsuzsanna Rakamazi. In May they competed at the European Championships in Baku, being 9th in the All-Around and 8th with 5 ropes. In July they took part in the 2nd editions of the Junior World Championships in Cluj-Napoca, finishing 10th in the All-Around, 12th with 5 balls, 9th with 5 ropes and 10th in teams.

In October 2024 she was selected along Szulamit Greta Bunda, Reka Barbara Titonelli, Georgina Koszegi-Kohary and Boglarka Barkócz for the Gymnasiade in Bahrain, winning bronze in the All-Around, with 5 hoops and with 10 clubs.

She became a senior in 2025, being incorporated into the rooster of the national senior group, making her debut at the World Cup in Baku where Hungary was 9th overall and 10th with 5 ribbons. In May competing at the European Cup stage in Burgas along Mandula Virag Meszaros, Monika Urban-Szabo, Dora Szabados, Dalma Pesti and Julia Farkas, she won bronze with 5 ribbons and with 3 balls & 2 hoops. In early May the group won bronze in the All-Around at the European Championships in Tallinn.
