= Julia Farkas =

Hungarian rhythmic gymnast

Júlia Farkas
- Born: February 23, 2005 (age 21) Pécs

Gymnastics career
- Discipline: Rhythmic gymnastics
- Country represented: Hungary (2023-)
- Club: MTK Budapest
- Head coach: Zsofia Lauber
Medal record
Representing Hungary
Rhythmic gymnastics
Bronze medal – third place	2025 Tallinn	Group All-around
European Cup
Gold medal – first place	2025 Burgas	Cross Battle
Bronze medal – third place	2025 Burgas	5 Ribbons
Bronze medal – third place	2025 Burgas	3 Balls & 2 Hoops

Julia Farkas (born 23 February 2005) is a Hungarian rhythmic gymnast. She represents Hungary as a member of the senior group.

== Personal life ==
Farkas took up rhythmic gymnastics at age eight. She was named Youth Female Athlete of the Year for 2019 and 2021 in Kaposvar.

== Career ==
=== Junior ===
In 2019 she was included in the Hungarian junior group that competed at the European Junior Championships in Baku, being 14th in the All-Around and 10th in teams. In June the group competed at the 2019 Junior World Championships in Moscow, being 6th overall, 6th in teams and 7th with 5 ribbons.

=== Senior ===
Farkas became a senior in 2021 and entered the rooster of the senior group, debuting at the World Championships in Kitakyushu along Mandula Virag Meszaros, Anita Fekete, Nadin Fodor, Reka Somhegyi and Monika Urban-Szabo where Hungary was 14th in the group All-Around and with 5 balls, 15th with 3 hoops and 4 clubs.

In 2022 she competed at the World Cup in Pamplona, ending 7th in the All-Around and with 5 hoops and 6th with 3 ribbons and 2 balls. A week later the group competed in Portimão, taking 7th place in the All-Around and 6th in the two event finals. In June she competed at the 2022 European Championships in Tel Aviv, along Lilla Jurca, Mandula Virag Meszaros, Dora Szabados, Monika Urban-Szabo and Lujza Varga, finishing 9th in teams, 8th in the All-Around, 11th in the 5 hoops final and 8th with 3 ribbons + 2 balls.

In 2025 the Hungarian group debuted at the Grand Prix in Thiais, winning gold with 5 ribbons as well as bronze in the All-Around and in the mixed event. At the World Cup in Baku they were 9th overall, 10th with 5 ribbons and 10th with 3 balls & 2 hoops. In May competing at the European Cup stage in Burgas along Mandula Virag Meszaros, Monika Urban-Szabo, Dora Szabados, Fruzsina Grek and Dalma Pesti, she won bronze with 5 ribbons and with 3 balls & 2 hoops.
