= Fresh! (Gina G song) =

1997 single by Gina G

Single by Gina G

from the album Fresh!
- Released: 10 March 1997
- Genre: Pop; Eurodisco; R&B
- Length: 3:43
- Label: Eternal
- Songwriters: Gina G; John Collins; Mark Taylor; Paul Barry
- Producer: Metro

Gina G singles chronology
"I Belong to You" (1996)	"Fresh!" (1997)	"Ti Amo" (1997)

Music video
- "Fresh!" on YouTube

"Fresh!" is a song by Australian singer-songwriter Gina G from her debut album of the same name (1997). Written by her with John Collins, Mark Taylor and Paul Barry, it was released in March 1997 by Eternal Records as the third single by Gina G and shortly before the parent album. One of the CD releases also contained an album teaser narrated by Mark Goodier. "Fresh!" was Gina's third and last top-10 hit, entering the UK charts at number six. Outside Europe, it charted in Australia, Israel and Mexico. The accompanying music video was directed by Cary Grim and filmed in Miami, featuring Gina G on the beach.

== Critical reception ==
Patrick McDonald from The Advertiser wrote that Gina G is "remaining in a joyous pop vein" with the "cheeky" song. J.D. Considine from The Baltimore Sun compared "Fresh!" to the songs that the Stock Aitken Waterman team devised for Rick Astley and Bananarama. Richard Paton from The Blade described it as a "peppy, R&B-influenced" song. Can't Stop the Pop deemed it a "retro-inspired bop", and "really fun, summery track once you’ve digested the shift in style. It’s a bit suggestive, a bit flirtatious and very, very catchy – the ad-libs towards the end of the song, in particular, are utterly joyous." Larry Printz from The Morning Call complimented it as "melodic".

A reviewer from Music Week gave it a score of four out of five, naming it "a cheerful pop racer. A guaranteed smash." People Magazine declared it as a "squeaky-clean Euro-disco blend of rushing synth melodies, chirpy vocals and dial-a-hook lyrics (like "I wanna get fresh/ With you, baby/I wanna do all the things that turn you on")." John Everson from SouthtownStar said it "is equally as "chewable" as "Ooh Aah... Just a Little Bit", "with a funky guitar line, background crowd cheers and a sassy, sultry Gina". Ian Hyland from Sunday Mirror stated that the "sparkly" Aussie "bounces back with a mid-Eighties Madonna soundalike", adding that the song is not as "high energy" as her last two hits.

== Chart performance ==
"Fresh!" was a moderate success on the charts on several continents. In Europe, it was a top-10 hit in both Scotland (6) and the United Kingdom (6). In the latter, the single went straight to number six in its first week at the UK Singles Chart, on 16 March 1997. It spent two weeks inside the top 10, and was Gina's last top-10 hit in the UK to date. The single spent seven weeks in the top 75 and a further six weeks in the top 200. Additionally, it was a top-30 hit in Ireland (29), and a top-40 hit in Iceland (38), as well as on the Eurochart Hot 100, where "Fresh!" hit number 35 in April 1997 after two weeks on the chart. In Germany, it reached number 83 with a total of 6 weeks within the German Singles Chart. Outside Europe, the single became a top-five hit in Mexico (5), a top-20 hit in Israel (19), and peaked at number 23 in Gina's native Australia, with six weeks within the ARIA singles chart from April to June 1997.

== Music video ==
The music video for "Fresh!" was directed by Cary Grim and filmed in Miami, the US. It features Gina G performing in a car, on the beach and in a swimming pool. She told in an interview, "The concept of this video is just getting very fresh. It's very playful - lots of fun, lots of sun, having a party...I wanted it to look as though I was one of the locals. I'm in the backyard, I look over the fence, see these people going to the beach and think, hey, I wanna be out there."

== Track listings ==
- 12", Germany (0630 18329)
1. "Fresh!" (Apollo 440 Remix) — 7:53
2. "Fresh!" (Apollo 440 Instrumental) — 7:55
3. "Fresh!" (Bayside Boys Vocal Club Mix) — 4:14
4. "Fresh!" (Phat'N'Phunky Vocal Club Mix) — 7:12
5. "Fresh!" (Phat'N'Phunky Refreshed Dub) — 6:32
- CD single, UK & Europe (WEA095CDX)
1. "Fresh!" (Metro Radio Version) — 3:43
2. "Fresh!" (Apollo 440 Remix) — 7:53
3. "Fresh!" (Phat 'N' Phunky Refreshed Dub) — 6:32
4. "Fresh!" (Apollo 440 Instrumental) — 7:55
5. "Fresh!" (Bayside Boys Dub) — 3:42
- CD maxi, UK (WEA095CD)
1. "Fresh!" (Metro Radio Version) — 3:43
2. "Fresh!" (Bayside Boys Radio Edit) — 3:20
3. "Fresh!" (Bayside Vocal Club Mix) — 4:14
4. Album Teaser — 2:38
- CD maxi, UK (WEA095CDX)
1. "Fresh!" (Metro Radio Version) — 3:43
2. "Fresh!" (Apollo 440 Remix) — 7:53
3. "Fresh!" (Phat 'N' Phunky Refreshed Dub) — 6:32
4. "Fresh!" (Apollo 440 Instrumental) — 7:55
5. "Fresh!" (Bayside Boys Dub) — 3:42

== Charts ==
=== Weekly charts ===
Chart (1997)	Peak position
Australia (ARIA)	23
Belgium (Ultratip Bubbling Under Flanders)	11
Estonia (Eesti Top 20)	7
Europe (Eurochart Hot 100)	35
France Airplay (SNEP)	95
Germany (GfK)	83
Iceland (Íslenski Listinn Topp 40)	38
Ireland (IRMA)	29
Israel (Israeli Singles Chart)	19
Mexico (Notitas Musicales)	5
Scotland (OCC)	6
UK Singles (OCC)	6

=== Year-end charts ===
Chart (1997)	Position
UK Singles (OCC)	133
