= John von Ahlen =

Australian musician and lead vocalist of Parralox

- Born: 26 June 1968 (age 57)
- Origin: Melbourne, Australia
- Genres: Synthpop; electronica; electropop; EDM
- Occupations: Singer; musician; songwriter
- Years active: 1993–present
- Labels: Subterrane Records; Mushroom Records; Sony Music Australia
- Member of: Parralox
- Formerly of: The Tenth Stage

John von Ahlen (born 26 September 1968) is an Australian musician, producer, vocalist, and instrumentalist based in Melbourne. He is the lead vocalist of the electronic pop and synthwave band Parralox, formed in 2008. Parralox caught the attention of the international EDM community within the same year. He has been additionally involved in other music projects, such as The Sound of the Crowd. and The Tenth Stage. Von Ahlen also hosts Neon Nights on Joy 94.9, Australia's largest LGBTIQ radio station. He is also an animal rights activist.

== Early life ==
John von Ahlen is based in Melbourne, Australia and he was born on 26 September 1968. As a child, he explored music, taking up both the saxophone and clarinet; by high school his focus had switched to piano and synthesisers.

== Career ==
=== Early music career ===
His first band, Nova, was signed to Sirius Music records via Sony Dancepool Australia in 1993. John signed to a publishing deal with Mushroom Records after co-writing tracks with Gina G for the album BC Nation by Australian pop act "Bass Culture". The track "Love Will Find a Way" from BC Nation was subsequently used in the Australian TV Soap Opera "Home and Away".

=== Film, television, and music videos ===
In 2000, John von Ahlen co-wrote and produced the song Get Tzatziki With It for the 2000 Australian comedy film The Wog Boy (starring Australian actor Nick Giannopoulos). He also contributed to other motion picture soundtracks including Happy Endings Sleepover, Mangus!, and Fat Girls.

In 2003, John von Ahlen produced the theme music for the Australian light entertainment television programme Rove Live, and he additionally composed and produced the theme music for the television comedy programs Skithouse and Before the Game.

John von Ahlen has directed and produced numerous music videos, with over 3 million views for his work with Parralox. In 1997, producer John Von Ahlen of Subterrane Recording Studio created an unofficial video for The Human League single "Stay With Me Tonight" that was distributed on the internet. The von Ahlen video utilized animated stills using 3dfx and Version 4.2 of Adobe Premiere. It has now become the de facto music video for the track.

=== Collaborations ===
While managed by Jaime Jimenez, John von Ahlen formed the production company "Planet J" and produced, remixed and co-wrote on many projects including the 2000 Australian comedy film The Wog Boy and collaborating with artists Emmanuel Carella, Chrissa, Jimmy Christo, X3, and Girl Friday.

John von Ahlen also collaborated with Ean Sugarman (of the Australian pop act Euphoria) and they produced and remixed for artists including Lani Zaitman, Melissa James and Dara.

John von Ahlen produced the track Somebody (Is Out There) for Paul Lekakis, known for his 80s hit Boom Boom (Let's Go Back to My Room).

John von Ahlen and Jiminez also formed the short lived dance project "Mr Jones" which was signed to Sony Music Australia, and released the single "Better Days" in 2002, and the "Big Adventure" in 2003 which featured Belinda Emmett on lead vocals.

John von Ahlen has also contributed vocals to the English synth project Sound of Science, as well as the Australian electronic music label Clan Analogue.

In 2018 John von Ahlen produced the single "Fly Me To The Moon" for the Australian trans-human performer "Venus Virgin Tomarz", released on his label Subterrane Records.

=== Parralox ===
Despite his successful career producing music for other artists, he felt the need to make music for himself – leading him to form the dark and gothic steampunk band The Tenth Stage. He soon started venturing more towards pop music. In 2008, he created the electronic pop and synthwave band Parralox, which has performed internationally and had international chart success on the U.S. Billboard Hot Dance/Club Charts, the UK Upfront Club Chart Top 40 and the Official UK Music Week Commercial Pop Top 30. Notable contributors to Parralox include Jane Badler, Marcella Detroit, and Ian Burden (The Human League). Influences on Paralox include Stuart Price, Trevor Horn, and Goldfrapp.

=== Neon Nights ===
John von Ahlen is the host of Neon Nights on Joy 94.9, Australia's largest LGBTIQ radio station. He has interviewed numerous artists on Neon Nights including Dannii Minogue, Róisín Murphy, Tina Arena, Stonebridge, CeCe Peniston, Bright Light Bright Light, Sheena Easton, The Pointer Sisters,Kim Wilde, Limahl, Vince Clarke of Erasure, Midge Ure of Ultravox, Peter Hook of New Order, Mi-Sex, The Dandy Warhols, Martika, Paul Lekakis, Crystal Waters, Whigfield, Marcella Detroit, Marcia Hines, Howard Jones, Tina Cousins,Corona, Culture Beat, and Billie Ray Martin.

== Discography ==
=== Parralox ===
- Electricity (2008)
- State of Decay (2009)
- Metropolis (2010)
- Metropolism (2011)
- Recovery (2013)
- Electricity (Expanded) (2014)
- Aeronaut (2015)
- Subculture (2016)
- Genesis (2019)
- Travelogue (2021)

=== The Tenth Stage ===
- The Tenth Stage (2006)
- Tales from the Casket (2008)
- Grand Guignol (2008)

=== Songwriting and production ===
Year	Artist	Title	Credits
1993	Suzie Ahern / Bass Culture	Love Will Find a Way	Co-written with Gina G and John Collins
1993	Gina G/Bass Culture	I'll Make You Happy	Co-written with Gina G and John Collins
1993	JVA Project ft. Debbie	Flashdance	Producer
1994	Nova	Reach Me	Producer Co-written with Lilia Auzou
1994	Discotron	Spaceline	Producer Co-written with D. Robinson
1994	Felice Arena	Better than Heaven	Producer
1994	World of Illusion	Dekonstruct	Producer
1994	Discotron	Nice'n'Sleazy-Spaceline	Producer Co-written with D. Robinson
1994	Lani Zaitman	Ectsasy	Co-produced with Ean Sugarman
1994	Melissa James	Baby Come Back	Co-produced with Ean Sugarman
1995	Suzie Ahern	Love Will Find a Way	Co-written with Gina G and John Collins
1995	Discotron	Stomper	Producer Co-written with D. Robinson
1995	Nova	Sexotechno Vol Two - Reach Me	Co-produced with Ean Sugarman Co-written with Lilia Auzou
1995	Dara	Last Dance	Co-produced with Ean Sugarman
1996	Nova	Hit News Vol 7. Reach Me	Producer Co-written with Lilia Auzou
1996	Nova	Magic	Producer Co-written with Lilia Auzou
1997	Discotron	STOMPER	Producer Co-written with D. Robinson
1997	Discotron	Dancemision - Antimatter World	Producer Co-written with D. Robinson
1997	Nova	Planet Earth	Producer
1997	Nova	Sole Sole	Producer Co-writer
1998	Peter Wilson	Mama Told Me	Producer
1999	Nova	Oh Lamour	Producer
2000	Various	Club Pumpin	Mastered By
2000	Jimmy Christo	Rainbow Eyes	Co-written with Jimmy Christo
2000	Planet J	Get Tzatziki With It	Co-produced with Jaime Jimenez Co-written with Jaime Jimenez and Nick Giannopoulos
2001	Chrissa	Secret Life	Co-written with Jaime Jimenez, Mary-Anne Mercuri, and Jodie Jimenez-Lyons
2001	X3	Girl Like me	Remixer
2001	Girl Friday	Box	Co-produced with Jaime Jimenez
2002	Rove	...Some More Music	Co-written with Jaime Jimenez, Rove McManus, Craig Campbell, and Belinda Emmett
2002	Mr. Jones	Better Days	Co-produced with Jaime Jimenez
2003	John von Ahlen, Jaime Jimenez	Before the Game aka After the Game TV theme	Producer Co-written with Jaime Jimenez
2003	John von Ahlen, Jaime Jimenez, Andrew Furze	Skithouse TV Theme	Co-written with Jaime Jimenez and Andrew Furze
2003	Belinda Emmett	Big Adventure	Co-produced with Jaime Jimenez
2003	June 13	Shoot the White Sheriff	Co-produced with Jaime Jimenez
2003	Revolva	Tragic Beauty	Co-produced with Jaime Jimenez
2003	Emmanuel Carella	Don't Say a Word	Co-produced with Jaime Jimenez
2003	Emmanuel Carella	Run to Me	Co-produced with Jaime Jimenez
