= Ti Amo (Gina G song) =

Single by Gina G

from the album Fresh!
- Released: 26 May 1997 (UK)
- Recorded: 1996
- Genre: Latin pop; Eurodance
- Length: 2:53
- Label: Eternal
- Songwriters: Gina G; Mark Taylor; Paul Barry
- Producer: Metro

Gina G singles chronology
"Fresh!" (1997)	"Ti Amo" (1997)	"Gimme Some Love" (1997)

Music video
- "Ti Amo" on YouTube

"Ti Amo" is a song recorded by Australian singer Gina G, released in May 1997 by Eternal Records as the fourth single from her debut album, Fresh! (1997). Written by her with Mark Taylor and Paul Barry, it is a flamenco-flavoured story of a holiday romance. It was a number-one hit in Romania and a top-10 hit in Scotland and Israel. In the UK, it peaked at number 11 and was the first single by her to not reach the UK top 10. Its accompanying music video was directed by Matt Broadley, depicting Gina G as a trophy wife of a mafia boss. She performed the song in the British music chart television programme Top of the Pops.

== Composition ==
The song moved away from Gina G.'s previous, fast-paced Eurodance songs and has a sultry, sensual mid-tempo that allows the singer to fully immerse herself into character and tell the tale of a torrid summer romance. It arrived well ahead of the Latin-pop phenomenon that swept the charts in the late 1990s and features influences like a Flamenco guitar. The song runs 2 minutes and 53 seconds long with a F♯ minor key and 100bpm.

== Critical reception ==
Upon the release, Larry Flick from Billboard magazine wrote, "'Ti Amo' has already scored as a huge hit in Europe and has been getting active play there since last summer—playing at every disco, on every car stereo, and in every home. It's been blasting many away by its exquisite dance beat and Gina G.'s sweetly tuneful voice. The nostalgic lyrics magnetically urge many listeners to long for one more "lazy summer day in the sun." The wonderfully rhythmic drums, melancholic guitars, and background chorus (emphasized by the use of both Italian and English) make 'Ti Amo' a pleasure to listen to. It's a single with the potential to blow away the U.S. market."

Can't Stop the Pop said it is "essentially the love-child" of Madonna’s 'La Isla Bonita' and Ace of Base's 'All That She Wants', adding that it "was the boldest attempt yet to show that Gina G could do more than giddy Eurodance." A reviewer from L.A. Weekly noted "the flamencofied guitars and castanets [which are] creating a storm-cloud-tinged Mediterranean-island-at-midnight undercurrent". Larry Printz from The Morning Call named it "ABBA-esque". Music Week gave "Ti Amo" a score of four out of five, writing that here, "flamenco guitar meets reggae lite with Gina's seductive vocals on top." Mark Beaumont from NME opined that it "wants to be 'La Isla Bonita' so much its maracas practically explode." John Everson from SouthtownStar described it as "a chugging amalgamation of synth rhythms and Spanish guitars, [where] she sings of lusty memories". Chris Dickinson from St. Louis Post-Dispatch wrote that the song "sounds like Madonna in Latino-disco mode".

== Chart performance ==
"Ti Amo" was a notable hit on several charts, peaking at number-one in Romania. In the United Kingdom, it was Gina's first release to miss the top 10, entering at number 11 on the UK Singles Chart, on June 1, 1997. The single spent five weeks in the UK top 75. In Finland and Scotland, it was a top-10 hit, peaking at number seven and nine. In Lithuania, it was a top-20 hit. On the Eurochart Hot 100, the song peaked at number 47 in its second week at the chart. It did also chart in Israel, where it reached number seven and in Gina G's native Australia, peaking at number 113 on the ARIA singles chart. Unlike "Ooh Aah... Just a Little Bit" and "Gimme Some Love", the song didn't chart in the US.

== Music video ==
A music video was produced to promote the single, directed by Swedish-based director Matt Broadley.

In the video, Gina G. plays the trophy wife of a mafia boss. She is locked up in her room, unhappy with her life and sitting in front of the mirror. She manages to run away and rides on a white horse to her secret lover. Her man are following her, but loses sight of her. Now with her lover, they dance tango by a burning fire. At the end of the video, she sneaks into her room before her husband finds her lying on her bed.

== Track listings ==
- 12", Germany (0630–19845–0)
1. "Ti Amo" (Metro's "Summer Of Love" Mix) — 5:51
2. "Ti Amo" (Basstown Flamenco Euro Mix) — 3:31
3. "Ti Amo" (The Handbaggers Mix) — 7:22
4. "Ti Amo" (Andy & The Lampboy Mastermix) — 6:41
5. "Ti Amo" (Bluehead Special Mix) — 6:41
- CD single CD1, Europe (WEA107CD1)
1. "Ti Amo" (Metro Radio Version) — 2:52
2. "Ti Amo" (Metro Extended Mix) — 4:21
3. "Ti Amo" (Bayside Boys Club Mix) — 5:34
4. "Ti Amo" (Metro's 'Summer Of Love' Club Mix) — 5:51
5. "Ti Amo" (Basstown Vocal Club Mix) — 5:18
6. "Ti Amo" (Basstown Euro Flamenco Mix) — 3:31
7. "Ti Amo" (Handbaggers Mix) — 7:22
- CD single CD2, Europe (WEA107CD2)
1. "Ti Amo" (Trouser Enthusiasts' Schoolboy Crush Mix) — 10:05
2. "Ti Amo" (Phat 'N' Phunky Club Mix) — 9:04
3. "Ti Amo" (Red Hand Gang Dub) — 7:20
4. "Ti Amo" (Andy And The Lamboy Mastermix) — 6:41
5. "Ti Amo" (Bluehead Special Mix) — 6:40
- CD maxi, UK (WEA0107CD1)
1. "Ti Amo" (Metro Radio Version) — 2:52
2. "Ti Amo" (Metro Extended Mix) — 4:21
3. "Ti Amo" (Bayside Boys Club Mix) — 5:34
4. "Ti Amo" (Metro's 'Summer Of Love' Club Mix) — 5:51
5. "Ti Amo" (Basstown Vocal Club Mix) — 5:18
6. "Ti Amo" (Basstown Euro Flamenco Mix) — 3:31
7. "Ti Amo" (Handbaggers Mix) — 7:22
- CD maxi, UK (WEA107CD2)
1. "Ti Amo" (Trouser Enthusiasts' Schoolboy Crush Mix) — 10:05
2. "Ti Amo" (Phat 'N' Phunky Club Mix) — 9:04
3. "Ti Amo" (Red Hand Gang Dub) — 7:20
4. "Ti Amo" (Andy And The Lamboy Mastermix) — 6:41
5. "Ti Amo" (Bluehead Special Mix) — 6:40

Other versions:

- "Ti Amo" (Andy & The Lamboy Dub Mix) (6:09) - from the UK promotional 12"
- "Ti Amo" (Andy & The Lamboy Strip Dub Mix) (6:09) - from the UK promotional 12"

== Charts ==
=== Weekly charts ===
Chart (1997)	Peak position
Australia (ARIA)	113
Belgium (Ultratip Bubbling Under Flanders)	14
Estonia (Eesti Top 20)	18
Europe (Eurochart Hot 100)	47
France Airplay (SNEP)	100
Israel (Israeli Singles Chart)	7
Lithuania (M-1)	12
Romania (Romanian Top 100)	1
Scotland (OCC)	9
UK Singles (OCC)	11
UK Singles (Music & Media)	10
UK Airplay (Music Week)	19
UK Club Chart (Music Week)	13

=== Year-end charts ===
Chart (1997)	Position
Romania (Romanian Top 100)	11
