= Lisa Maxwell =

Lisa Maxwell may refer to:

- Lisa Maxwell (actress) (born 1963), English actress and television presenter
- Lisa Maxwell (singer, songwriter), Australian singer and songwriter
