= Gimme Some Love =

Single by Gina G

from the album Fresh!
- B-side: "Higher Than Love"
- Released: 25 August 1997 (UK)
- Recorded: 1996
- Genre: Euro-NRG; house; techno
- Length: 3:31
- Label: Eternal; WEA
- Songwriters: Gina G; Bob Wainwright; John Collins; Mark Taylor; Richard Burton
- Producer: Metro

Gina G singles chronology
"Ti Amo" (1997)	"Gimme Some Love" (1997)	"Every Time I Fall" (1997)

Music video
- "Gimme Some Love" on YouTube

"Gimme Some Love" is a song recorded by Australian singer-songwriter Gina G from her debut album, Fresh! (1997). Released in August 1997 by Eternal and WEA, it was the fifth single release by Gina G (though the catalogue number indicates it may have been planned to be released ahead of "Ti Amo") and the second single to be released in the US. She wrote the song with Bob Wainwright, John Collins, Mark Taylor and Richard Burton. In the UK, "Gimme Some Love" peaked at number 25 (her last top-40 hit), spending just two weeks in the UK top 75 and a further three weeks in the top 200. The second UK CD release contained remixes of "Higher Than Love", a Motiv8-produced song from the Fresh! album, which had previously been released on promotional vinyl.

== Critical reception ==
Patrick McDonald from The Advertiser noted that the singer "dances on the edge of a techno beat" with "Gimme Some Love". J.D. Considine from The Baltimore Sun remarked the song's "pumping house beats". Larry Flick from Billboard magazine wrote, "Hot on the heels of 'Ooh Aah... Just a Little Bit' comes this frenetic Euro-NRG stomper. Hard as it may be to believe, the hook here is just as quick and catchy as its predecessor, and Gina's wide-eyed performance bursts with infectious glee. Expect to be bouncing to this well into the spring season—and use it as an excuse to dip into the singer's festive full-length set Fresh!." Richard Paton from The Blade complimented the "irresistible grooves" of the song.

British magazine Music Week gave it a score of three out of five, naming it "another breathless uptempo track from Gina's undeservedly overlooked album. It has spent nine weeks on the Billboard Hot 100 and should see significant chart action here." A reviewer from People Magazine commented, "Don't be surprised to find yourself high on the giddiness of impossibly catchy numbers like 'Follow the Light' and 'Gimme Some Love'". In a retrospective review, Pop Rescue said the song has "tons of house piano and synth sequences, and a bass and drum sequence that sounds like it’s popped round after finishing working for contemporaries 2 Unlimited or Culture Beat."

== Chart performance ==
"Gimme Some Love" was a moderate success on the charts, reaching the top 10 on the RPM Dance/Urban chart (8) and the top 50 on the RPM Top Singles chart (48) in Canada, the top 20 in Scotland (17) and the top 30 in the United Kingdom. In the latter, the single peaked at number 25 in its first week at the UK Singles Chart, on August 31, 1997. On the UK Pop Tip Chart by Music Week, it reached number one for several weeks. "Gimme Some Love" was also Gina G's last top-40 hit in the UK. On the Eurochart Hot 100, it peaked at number 54 in its first week on the chart, on September 13. In the US, the song peaked at number 46 on the Billboard Hot 100. In Oceania, it charted in Gina G's native Australia, reaching only number 121.

== Track listings ==
- CD maxi, UK (WEA0101CD1)
1. "Gimme Some Love" (Radio Edit) — 3:31
2. "Gimme Some Love" (Metro's Extended Eurobeat Mix) — 5:47
3. "Gimme Some Love" (Hysteric Ego "Rahh Mix") — 6:45
4. "Gimme Some Love" (Andy & The Lamboy Mix) — 7:05
5. "Gimme Some Love" (Fitch Bros. Exit Boston) — 8:36
- CD maxi, UK (WEA101CD2)
1. "Gimme Some Love" (Album Version) — 3:30
2. "Higher Than Love" (Motiv8 Pumptronic 12" Mix) — 6:48
3. "Higher Than Love" (Motiv8 Steinway Mix) — 7:34
4. "Higher Than Love" (Rhythm Masters Mix) — 5:43

Other versions:

- "Gimme Some Love" (Gimme Some Dub (Stewman's Edit)) (6:46) - from the US release
- "Gimme Some Love" (Fitch Bros. Symphony No. 4 In B Flat Minor) (10:20) - from the US release
- "Gimme Some Love" (Fitch Bros. Exit Boston Radio Edit) (3:42) - from the US promotional 12"
- "Higher Than Love" (Motiv8 7" Edit) (3:46) - an alternate name for the version on the album Fresh!
- "Higher Than Love" (Riffmatic Vocal Mix) - from the UK promotional 12"

== Charts ==
Chart (1997)	Peak position
Australia (ARIA)	121
Canada Top Singles (RPM)	48
Canada Dance/Urban (RPM)	8
Estonia (Eesti Top 20)	19
Europe (Eurochart Hot 100)	54
Scotland (OCC)	17
UK Singles (OCC)	25
UK Pop Tip Chart (Music Week)	1
US Billboard Hot 100	46
