= Parralox discography =

- Studio albums: 14
- EPs: 5
- Compilation albums: 3
- Remix albums: 5
- Singles: 28
- Music videos: 31
- Lyric videos: 3

The discography of Parralox, an Australian synthpop group, includes thirteen studio albums, five extended plays, thirteen singles, eleven music videos and three lyric videos.

In addition to their five albums of original material, the group has released two covers of early Human League albums in their entirety; another album of covers originally by various artists; and eleven albums and EPs in the Holiday series, yearly releases consisting of covers.

== Albums ==
=== Studio albums ===
List of studio albums
Title	Details
Electricity	Released: 11 September 2008; Label: Subterrane, Conzoom; Format: CD, digital download; Notes: First released as a limited edition CD. Released digitally in February 2009 with subtle differences.
State of Decay	Released: 13 November 2009; Label: Subterrane, Conzoom; Format: CD, digital download
Metropolis	Released: 26 November 2010; Label: Subterrane, Conzoom, Center of Attention (US); Format: CD, digital download
Recovery	Released: 26 July 2013; Label: Subterrane, Conzoom; Format: CD, digital download; Notes: Consists of covers of songs by various artists. The CD and digital tracklists vary.
Aeronaut	Released: 3 April 2015; Label: Subterrane, Conzoom; Format: CD, digital download
Holiday '15	Released: 27 November 2015; Label: Subterrane, Conzoom; Format: CD, digital download
Holiday '16	Released: 23 December 2016; Label: Subterrane, Conzoom; Format: CD, digital download
Holiday '17	Released: 8 December 2017; Label: Subterrane, Conzoom; Format: CD, digital download
Reproduction	Released: 29 December 2017; Label: Subterrane; Format: Digital download; Notes: Cover of the album of the same name by The Human League.
Holiday '18	Released: 23 November 2018; Label: Subterrane, Conzoom; Format: CD, digital download
Genesis	Released: 25 October 2019; Label: Subterrane, Conzoom; Format: CD, digital download
Holiday '19	Released: 22 November 2019; Label: Subterrane, Conzoom; Format: CD, digital download
Holiday '20	Released: 18 December 2020; Label: Subterrane, Conzoom; Format: CD, digital download
Travelogue	Released: 26 November 2021; Label: Subterrane, Conzoom; Format: CD, digital download; Notes: Cover of the album of the same name by The Human League.

=== Remix albums ===
List of remix albums
Title	Details
Metropolism	Released: 21 February 2011; Label: Subterrane, Conzoom; Format: CD, digital download; Notes: Consists mostly of remixes of songs from Metropolis.
Electricity (Expanded)	Released: 31 October 2014; Label: Subterrane, Conzoom; Format: CD, digital download; Notes: CD edition reissues the original Electricity album with several demos and remixes added. Digital edition consists of extended mixes of all tracks from the original album.
Electricity (Acapellas)	Released: April 2019; Label: Subterrane; Format: Digital download
Dubculture	Released: 2 September 2022; Label: Subterrane, Conzoom; Format: CD, digital download
Holiday Remixed – Volume One	Released: 31 March 2023; Label: Subterrane, Conzoom; Format: CD, digital download

=== Compilation albums ===
List of compilation albums
Title	Details
Singles 1	Released: 7 June 2019; Label: Subterrane, Conzoom; Format: LP, digital download; Notes: Includes singles from 2009–2013.
Singles 2	Released: 27 November 2020; Label: Subterrane, Conzoom; Format: LP, digital download; Notes: Includes singles from 2013–2019.
Holiday '21/'22	Released: 31 March 2023; Label: Subterrane, Conzoom; Format: CD, digital download; Notes: Includes all tracks from Holiday '21 and Holiday '22 plus bonus tracks.

=== Extended plays ===
List of EPs
Title	Details
Holiday '14	Released: 29 November 2014; Label: Subterrane, Conzoom; Format: CD, digital download
Holiday '21	Released: 31 November 2021; Label: Subterrane; Format: Digital download
Holiday '22	Released: December 2022; Label: Subterrane; Format: Digital download
Holiday '23	Released: 19 January 2024; Label: Subterrane; Format: Digital download
Holiday '24	Released: 31 January 2025 (expanded edition) / 28 March 2025 (standard edition); Label: Subterrane; Format: Digital download; Notes: Expanded edition is exclusive to Bandcamp and adds 11 demos and alternate mixes. Standard edition consists of three songs, released individually from 13 December 2024 – 7 February 2025.

== Singles ==
List of singles
Year	Title	Album
2009	"Sharper Than a Knife" (Note: Retroactively referred to as "Sharper Than a Knife (2009)".)	Electricity
2009	"Hotter"	State of Decay
2009	"I Am Human"	State of Decay
2010	"Isn't It Strange"	State of Decay
2010	"Supermagic"	Metropolis
2011	"I Sing the Body Electric"	Metropolis
2011	"Creep"	Electricity
2012	"Sharper Than a Knife" (2012)	Non-album singles (Note: "Sharper Than a Knife (2012)" was included on promotional copies of Metropolis, titled "Sharper Than a Knife (Resharpened)".)
2013	"Enjoy the Silence"	Non-album singles
2013	"Silent Morning" (feat. Ryan Adamés)	Recovery
2013	"Eye in the Sky"	Recovery
2013	"Polyester"	Non-album singles
2014	"Crying on the Dancefloor" (feat. Francine)	Non-album singles
2015	"Aeronaut"	Aeronaut
2016	"Wildlife"	Aeronaut
2017	"Electric Nights"	Subculture
2018	"Paradise" (feat. Marcella Detroit)	Subculture
2019	"Change of Heart"	Subculture
2020	"Machines" (Dubstar remix)	Non-album singles (Note: The original version of "Machines" appears on Metropolis. "Shalom", "Lattidore", and "Beautiful Dreamer" all appear on the album Life Is Calling, attributed to von Ahlen's side project The Sound of the Crowd.)
2020	"Conclusion" (feat. Nic Toupee)	Non-album singles
2022	"Shalom" (feat. Ulla Kruse)	Non-album singles
2022	"Lattidore" (feat. Ulla Kruse)	Non-album singles
2022	"Beautiful Dreamer" (feat. Ulla Kruse)	Non-album singles
2023	"Ghosts Again"	Non-album singles
2023	"Tears of Faith" (feat. Jane Badler)	Genesis
2023	"Goodbye Berlin"	Genesis
2024	"Steppin' Out"	Holiday '24
2025	"Teardrop"	Holiday '24

== Music videos ==
List of music videos
Year	Title	Director(s)
2009	"Sharper Than a Knife"	John von Ahlen
2009	"Sharper Than a Knife" (Mark Reeder remix)	John von Ahlen
2009	"Hotter"	John von Ahlen
2010	"Supermagic"	John von Ahlen
2010	"Isn't It Strange"	John von Ahlen
2010	"Isn't It Strange" (Ade Fenton remix)	John von Ahlen
2011	"I Sing the Body Electric"	John von Ahlen
2011	"Creep"	John von Ahlen
2011	"Creep" (Cosmic Dawn remix)	John von Ahlen
2012	"Sharper Than a Knife" (2012)	John von Ahlen
2012	"Sharper Than a Knife" (Andi Durrant & Steve More remix)	John von Ahlen
2012	"Sharper Than a Knife" (Wideboys remix)	John von Ahlen
2012	"Silent Morning" (feat. Ryan Adamés)	John von Ahlen
2013	"Eye in the Sky"	John von Ahlen
2014	"Crying on the Dancefloor" (feat. Francine)	Simon Wan
2015	"Aeronaut"	John von Ahlen
2016	"Wildlife"	John von Ahlen
2017	"Electric Nights"	John von Ahlen
2019	"Change of Heart" (Italoconnection remix)	John von Ahlen
2020	"Machines"	John von Ahlen
2020	"Conclusion"	John von Ahlen
2022	"The Power and the Glory"	John von Ahlen
2022	"Shalom" (feat. Ulla Kruse)	John von Ahlen
2022	"Lattidore" (feat. Ulla Kruse)	John von Ahlen
2022	"86G" (feat. A7-H – Foretaste remix)	John von Ahlen
2023	"Ghosts Again"	John von Ahlen
2023	"Tears of Faith" (feat. Jane Badler)	Leanne Hanley
2023	"Goodbye Berlin"	John von Ahlen
2024	"Steppin' Out"	John von Ahlen
2025	"Teardrop"	John von Ahlen
2025	"Beautiful World" (live in Melbourne)	Nic Toupee (filming); John von Ahlen (editing)

=== Lyric videos ===
List of lyric videos
Year	Title	Animator
2012	"Sharper Than a Knife" (Pete Hammond remix)	John von Ahlen
2013	"Silent Morning" (feat. Ryan Adamés)	John von Ahlen
2014	"Crying on the Dancefloor" (feat. Francine)	John von Ahlen
