= I Belong to You (Gina G song) =

1996 single by Gina G

Single by Gina G

from the album Fresh!
- Released: 28 October 1996
- Genre: Dance-pop; Eurobeat; hi-NRG
- Length: 3:19
- Label: Eternal
- Songwriters: Gina G; Bill Colbourne
- Producer: Metro

Gina G singles chronology
"Ooh Aah... Just a Little Bit" (1996)	"I Belong to You" (1996)	"Fresh!" (1997)

Music video
- "I Belong to You" on YouTube

"I Belong to You" is a song by Australian singer-songwriter Gina G from her debut album, Fresh! (1997). The single was released on 28 October 1996, by Eternal Records, as the follow-up to the singer's highly successful "Ooh Aah... Just a Little Bit" and was her first release to be produced by Metro, who would produce the majority of her singles. Written by her with Bill Colbourne, it spent two weeks in the UK top 10, peaking at number six, and spent a further nine weeks in the top 75. (and a further 9 weeks in the top 200). The single was also a top-20 hit in Denmark, Finland, Ireland and Mexico. Its music video, directed by Max Giwa and Dania Pasquini, featured Gina G as a genie in a lamp. She performed "I Belong to You" in various TV-shows, like Top of the Pops and WOW!.

== Critical reception ==
Neil Hannon for Melody Maker commented, "Eurobeat. I like it! Gina G looks like the kind of mum I fancied when I was 12 years old — in fact, that I still fancy. And 'Ooh Aah... Just a Little Bit' was fantastic. It was up-to-the-minute, it was trendy, it was cool and it was also (whispers) just a little bit sexy. This is basically the same song, changed round." A reviewer from Music Week gave "I Belong to You" a score of four out of five and complimented it as "hugely catchy dance pop", adding, "It is unlikely to get as much exposure as her Eurovision contender, but deserves to be a smash." In a retrospective review, Pop Rescue stated that the song followed its predecessor "perfectly as it is fairly similar in sound", noting that it "really gallops along, with a chugging fat synth line as Gina's vocals sit flawlessly on top. This is a lovely dance pop song." British newspaper Sunday Mirror described it as "high energy".

== Chart performance ==
"I Belong to You" proved to be a major hit on several continents. In Europe, it was a top-10 hit in Iceland and the UK. In the latter country, it went straight to number six in its first week at the UK Singles Chart, on 3 November 1996. But on Music Week's UK Pop Tip Club Chart, it peaked at number-one same month. Additionally, the single was a top-20 hit in Denmark, Finland and Ireland, and a top-30 hit in Sweden. On the Eurochart Hot 100, the song peaked at number 37 on 30 November. Outside Europe, "I Belong to You" reached the top 30 in Mexico. In Israel, the song became a top-10 hit, peaking at number eight. In Canada, it peaked at number 21 on the RPM Dance chart, while peaking at number 34 in Gina G's native Australia.

== Track listings ==
- UK: CD Maxi (WEA081CD)
1. "I Belong to You" (Radio Edit) — 3:19
2. "I Belong to You" (12" Extended Mix) — 5:46
3. "I Belong to You" (Hysteric Ego Vocal Mix) — 6:11
4. "I Belong to You" (Matt Darey Mix) — 6:56
5. "I Belong to You" (Phat 'N' Phunky Club Mix) — 7:42
6. "I Belong to You" (Hysteric Ego Dub) — 6:11
- UK: Limited Edition CD Maxi (WEA081CDX)
1. "I Belong to You" (Radio Edit) — 3:19
2. "Ooh Aah... Just a Little Bit" – Eurovision Version) — 3:02
3. "Ooh Aah... Just a Little Bit" – Karaoke Version) — 3:02
4. Gina Interview — 14:06

== Charts ==
=== Weekly charts ===
Chart (1996–1997)	Peak position
Australia (ARIA)	34
Belgium (Ultratip Bubbling Under Flanders)	4
Canada Dance/Urban (RPM)	21
Denmark (IFPI)	12
Estonia (Eesti Top 20)	12
Estonia Airplay (Eesti Top 25)	4
Europe (Eurochart Hot 100)	37
Europe (European Dance Radio)	14
Finland (Suomen virallinen lista)	18
Iceland (Íslenski Listinn Topp 40)	10
Ireland (IRMA)	16
Israel (Israeli Singles Chart)	8
Scotland (OCC)	3
Sweden (Topplistan)	24
UK Singles (OCC)	6
UK Airplay (Music Week)	18
UK Pop Tip Club Chart (Music Week)	1

=== Year-end charts ===
Chart (1996)	Position
UK Singles (OCC)	88
UK Pop Tip Club Chart (Music Week)	3
