= Mandula Virag Meszaros =

Hungarian rhythmic gymnast

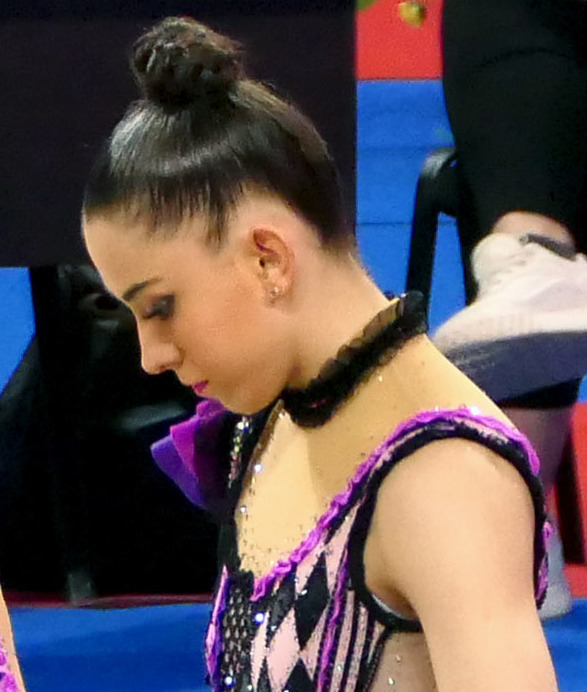
- Meszaros in 2024

Personal information
- Nickname: Mandi
- Born: 26 January 2005 (age 21) Budapest, Hungary

Gymnastics career
- Discipline: Rhythmic gymnastics
- Country represented: Hungary; (2021-)
- Club: MTK Budapest
- Head coach: Zsofia Lauber
Medal record
Representing Hungary
Rhythmic gymnastics
Bronze medal – third place	2025 Tallinn	Group All-around
European Cup
Gold medal – first place	2025 Burgas	Cross Battle
Bronze medal – third place	2025 Burgas	5 Ribbons
Bronze medal – third place	2025 Burgas	3 Balls & 2 Hoops

Mandula Virag Meszaros (born 26 January 2005) is a Hungarian rhythmic gymnast, member of the national group.

== Career ==
Meszaros entered the rooster of the senior national group in 2021, debuting at the World Championships in Kitakyushu along Julia Farkas, Anita Fekete, Nadin Fodor, Reka Somhegyi and Monika Urban-Szabo where Hungary was 14th in the group All-Around and with 5 balls, 15th with 3 hoops and 4 clubs.

In 2022 she competed at the World Cup in Pamplona, ending 7th in the All-Around and with 5 hoops and 6th with 3 ribbons and 2 balls. A week later the group competed in Portimão, taking 7th place in the All-Around and 6th in the two event finals. In June she competed at the 2022 European Championships in Tel Aviv, finishing 9th in teams, 8th in the All-Around, 11th in the 5 hoops final and 8th with 3 ribbons + 2 balls. In September Mandula took part in the World Championships in Sofia along Lilla Jurca, Alexa Amina Meszaros, Dora Szabados, Monika Urban-Szabo and Lujza Varga and the individuals Fanni Pigniczki and Hanna Panna Wiesner, taking 16th place in the All-Around, 16th with 5 hoops and 15th with 3 ribbons + 2 balls.
