= Fresh! =

Studio album by Gina G
- Released: 4 March 1997 (US)
- Recorded: March 1995–January 1997
- Genre: Dance-pop
- Length: 49:42
- Label: Eternal; Warner Bros.
- Producer: Steve Allen (executive)

Gina G chronology
Fresh! (1997)	Get Up & Dance (2005)

Singles from Fresh!
- 1. "Ooh Aah... Just a Little Bit" Released: 25 March 1996; 2. "I Belong to You" Released: 28 October 1996; 3. "Fresh!" Released: 10 March 1997; 4. "Ti Amo" Released: 26 May 1997; 5. "Gimme Some Love" Released: 25 August 1997; 6. "Every Time I Fall" Released: 3 November 1997

Fresh! is the debut album by Australian dance-pop singer-songwriter Gina G, released in 1997. The album includes the single "Ooh Aah... Just a Little Bit", which was the United Kingdom's entry in the 1996 Eurovision Song Contest. Following the contest, the single reached number one in the UK and went on to become a worldwide hit.

The album was re-released in May 2024.

== Singles ==
The lead single "Ooh Aah... Just a Little Bit", written by Simon Tauber and Steve Rodway, was first released in March 1996 in the UK. It was selected as the UK's entry for the 1996 Eurovision Song Contest, which took place in Oslo, Norway. Despite placing eighth, the song went on to achieve worldwide success, peaking at No. 1 on the UK Singles Chart and No. 12 on the Billboard Hot 100 the following year. To that date, it was one of very few Eurovision entries to chart in the US market. The album features five additional singles, four of which were co-written by Gina G: "I Belong to You", the title track (both peaked at No. 6 in the UK), "Ti Amo" (No. 11), "Gimme Some Love" (No. 25) and the final single "Every Time I Fall", the first ballad to be released from the album, (No. 52).

== Commercial performance ==
The album peaked at No. 12 on the UK Albums Chart and No. 27 on the US Billboard Heatseekers chart. It was certified Silver (marking sales of 60,000) in the United Kingdom.

== Album artwork ==
The album artwork features Gina G covered in chocolate icing, and was shot by famed photographer David LaChapelle.

== Critical reception ==
Professional ratings
Review scores
Source	Rating
The Advertiser	(favorable)
AllMusic	4.5/5 stars
The Blade	(favorable)
NME	1/10
The Guardian	2/5 stars
Knoxville Sentinel	2.5/5 stars
News of the World	(favorable)

The Baltimore Sun concluded: "As much as 'Ooh aah ... Just a Little Bit' or the title tune might seem to replay formulas the Stock/Aitken/Waterman team devised for Rick Astley and Bananarama, the fact is, they sound fresher in Gina G's hands than they did originally."

== Track listing ==
Fresh! track listing
No.	Title	Writer(s)	Producer(s)	Length
1.	"Ooh Aah... Just a Little Bit" (Motiv8 Radio Edit)	Simon Tauber; Steve Rodway	Rodway	3:23
2.	"Fresh!"	Gina Gardiner; Paul Barry; John Collins; Mark Taylor	Metro	3:45
3.	"Ti Amo"	Gardiner; Barry; Taylor	Metro	2:54
4.	"Every Time I Fall"	Anders Bagge; Meja Beckman; Harry Sommerdahl	Phil Harding; Ian Curnow; Bagge; Julian Gallagher (assistant)	4:02
5.	"Follow the Light"	Rodway; Tauber	Rodway	4:17
6.	"Gimme Some Love"	Gardiner; Collins; Taylor; Robert Wainwright; Richard Burton	Metro	3:32
7.	"Rhythm of My Life"	Rodway	Rodway	3:43
8.	"Missin' You Like Crazy"	Ray Ruffin; Rueben Martin	Cutfather & Joe	4:46
9.	"I Belong to You" (Radio Edit)	Gardiner; William Colbourne	Metro	3:21
10.	"Higher Than Love"	Rodway; Tauber	Rodway	3:46
11.	"It Doesn't Mean Goodbye"	Rodway	Rodway	5:27
12.	"Ooh Aah... Just a Little Bit" (Motiv8 Vintage Honey Mix)	Tauber; Rodway	Rodway	6:46
Total length:				49:42

== Charts ==
Chart performance for Fresh!
Chart (1997)	Peak position
Australian Albums (ARIA)	53
Norwegian Albums (VG-lista)	40
Scottish Albums (OCC)	13
UK Albums (OCC)	12
US Heatseekers Albums (Billboard)	27

== Certifications ==
Certifications for Fresh!
Region	Certification	Certified units/sales
United Kingdom (BPI)	Silver	60,000^{^}
^{^} Shipments figures based on certification alone.

== Release history ==
Release history and formats for Fresh!
Country	Date	Label	Format	Catalogue number
United States	4 March 1997	Eternal/Warner Bros.	CD	9 46517–2
United Kingdom	24 March 1997	Eternal/Warner Music UK	CD	0630–17840–2
Philippines	4 March 1997	Eternal/WEA	Cassette	0630–17840–2
United Kingdom	31 May 2024	90/9 Records	2xCD+DVD, Purple Vinyl	QNTN3BOX005, QNTNLP005
