= Parralox =

Australian synthpop band

- Origin: Melbourne, Victoria, Australia
- Genres: Synthpop; electronica; electropop; EDM
- Years active: 2008–present
- Labels: Subterrane, Conzoom
- Members: John von Ahlen; Johanna Gervin; Louise Love
- Past members: Rowena "Roxy" Martin; Amii Jackson; Ian Burden; Francine Ihenacho; Phil Ceberano
- Website: parralox.com

Parralox is an Australian synthpop band formed by John von Ahlen in 2008. Originally featuring lead vocalist Rowena "Roxy" Martin and producer-songwriter von Ahlen, the band has undergone a number of line-up changes, including the additions of vocalists Amii Jackson, Johanna Gervin and Louise Love, and the addition of The Human League's Ian Burden on bass guitar.

Their debut single "I Fell in Love with a Drum Machine", released February 2008, caught the attention of the international EDM community, propelling the duo from local to international prominence. In 2009, Parralox remixed Swedish electronica artist Emmon's "Lips on Fire" single earning the band an official release on Wonderland Records. Parralox digitally distribute their music through independent label Subterrane Records; in 2009 the band signed to German electro label, Conzoom Records. Parralox have gained support and acclaim from Perez Hilton and veteran music blogger, Arjan Writes.

As of September 2025, the band have released seven albums of original material, and three albums consisting of covers, as well as eleven albums and EPs in their "Holiday" series of covers. They have performed internationally in Germany, Sweden, Spain, the United States and England.

== History ==
=== Background ===
As a child, John von Ahlen explored music, taking up both the saxophone and clarinet; by high school his focus had switched to piano and synthesisers. In 1993, von Ahlen teamed with international songwriter John Collins and Grammy nominee Gina G together contributing songs to Bass Culture's BC Nation album, soon signed to Michael Gudinski's Mushroom Records. The label's affiliation with popular Australian soap operas Neighbours and Home and Away facilitated the Collins/von Ahlen penned, "Love Will Find A Way" featuring Susie Ahern appearing in a 1995 Neighbours' episode, aired on Network Ten. Von Ahlen, would produce and write with a number of bands including dance act Nova (1992–1996), electronic band, Discotron (1995–1998) and steampunk, goth cabaret-pop outfit, The Tenth Stage (2006) before forming Parralox in 2008.

=== Formation ===
Originally introduced to Roxy by John Collins, von Ahlen enlisted the classically trained vocalist to join him on the Parralox project in 2007. The pair had been working together since their 2004 win at the coveted MusicOz Awards, where Roxy won Best Dance Artist with the duo's "Electric Nights" entry. Splitting her time between Australia and the UK, singer/songwriter Roxy became the band's first lead vocalist.

=== 2008–2009: Electricity and State of Decay ===
In August 2008, Parralox released their debut album Electricity; made available for digital download and accompanied by the special edition CD version Electricity (Limited Edition), the album achieved the sixth-highest position atop the British alternative music store, MusicNonStop.co.uk sales chart. By November 2008, the band were performing overseas in London alongside Northern Kind and Red Blooded Women. Electricity spawned the songs "Sharper Than a Knife" and "X Minus One"; the latter licensed to Nick Bitzenis and George Geranios' Athens based, Undo Records/EMI Greece's compilation album of new electronic pop music, Electronically Yours Vol 1. The band's growing popularity was confirmed when Hollywood gossip columnist Perez Hilton championed the band's first US single, "Sharper Than a Knife".

The successful independent release of Electricity led to the band signing with German label, Conzoom Records in 2009. A change of line up that same year saw Roxy replaced by Amii Jackson on vocals and the addition of The Human League's Ian Burden on bass guitar. The daughter of Brian Jackson, lead guitarist for Scottish punk band The Zips, Amii recorded on four of the band's following seven albums, beginning with State of Decay released 13 November 2009.

=== 2010–2013: Metropolis and Recovery ===
Between 2010 and 2013, Parralox released 3 albums, Metropolis (2010), Metropolism (2011) and Recovery (2013). This marked a period of growth and expansion for the band; in an AusPop.com.au review of Metropolis the site expressed that "Parralox have ever so slowly been developing into a pop act that excites with each and every release". The band toured both at home and abroad performing at Infest, UK (2010), Electrocity Festival, Germany (2010), Electronic Summer, Sweden (2012), Poptronik Festival, Spain (2012) and Midsumma Festival, Melbourne (2013). In May 2012, the band's single "Creep" peaked at No. 45 on the US Billboard Dance/Club chart. In 2013, von Ahlen spoke as an invited EDM panellist at The Winter Music Conference, Miami; this same year, London based EQ Music launched its new artist management arm and signed the "electronic pop duo".

"Eye in the Sky", the second single from Recovery is a cover of The Alan Parsons Project's 1982 song of the same name. QueerMeUp.com called the song a Pulitzer Prize worthy piece of poetry. The song's visuals were co-directed by John Ibrahim and lead singer von Ahlen with "the modern new face of Chadwick Models", high fashion model Rowena Xi Kang.

=== 2014–2017: Aeronaut, Reproduction and Subculture ===
In February 2014, Parralox released their "Eye In The Sky" EP securing the band's seventh German chart position. In July 2014, they released "Crying on the Dance Floor" featuring new vocalist Johanna Gervin and Francine Ihenacho as guest vocalist. The single climbed to No. 6 on Music Week's Commercial Pop Chart. On 6 October, Erasure announced their London performance dates dubbed The Violet Flame Tour with support from Parralox. On 31 October 2014, Parralox released their sixth album, a limited 2CD re-release of Electricity titled Electricity (Expanded).

On 3 April 2015, Parralox released the band's seventh official album Aeronaut which positioned John von Ahlen on lead vocals for the second time in the band's career, this according to LexerMusic.com, marks a new era for the electronic pop act. The video accompanying the album's lead single "Aeronaut", is shot on location in Paris and is a follow-up collaboration between von Ahlen and creative director John Ibrahim who previously worked on their "Eye in the Sky" video.

On 10 March 2015, Parralox's German label, Conzoom announced an eighth studio album from the band, then due for release end of 2015, titled Subculture.

== Touring ==
Parralox have performed live at various festivals including Infest, Winter Music Conference, Silicon Dreams, Synthetic City, Poptronik, Midsumma Festival and Pride Festival, Melbourne. They have also played support slots for Erasure and Polly Scattergood in London.

== Band members ==
=== Current members ===
- John von Ahlen – vocals, synthesiser, production, songwriting (2008–present)
- Johanna Gervin – vocals, synthesiser (2014–present)
- Louise Love – vocals, synthesiser (2015–present)

=== Former members ===
- Rowena "Roxy" Martin – vocals (2008–2009)
- Amii Jackson – vocals (2009–2013)
- Ian Burden – bass guitar (2009–2014)
- Francine Ihenacho – vocals (2014)
- Lillia Auzou (née Mendoza) – vocals, songwriting (guest, 2014–2019)
- Phil Ceberano – guitar (2016–2017)
- Marcella Detroit – vocals (guest, 2016–2019)
- Jane Badler – vocals (guest, 2019–2024)

== Discography ==
=== Studio albums ===
- Electricity (2008)
- State of Decay (2009)
- Metropolis (2010)
- Recovery (2013)
- Aeronaut (2015)
- Subculture (2017)
- Reproduction (2017)
- Genesis (2019)
- Travelogue (2021)
