= Love the Life =

Single by Bass Culture featuring Geena

from the album BC Nation
- Released: (Australia) 18 May 1992
- Recorded: 1992
- Genre: Dance-pop; house
- Length: 4:12
- Label: Mushroom Records
- Songwriters: David Berman; Gina Gardiner; Mark James
- Producers: Peewee Ferris; Mark James

Bass Culture singles chronology
"Love the Life" (1992)	"Love Will Find a Way" (1993)

Geena singles chronology
"Love the Life" (1992)	"Ooh Aah... Just a Little Bit" (1996)

Music video
- "Love the Life" on YouTube

"Love the Life" is the 1992 debut single by the Australian act Bass Culture, featuring vocalist and songwriter Gina Gardiner, who was credited as Geena before becoming more internationally known as Gina G. The single was taken from the group's debut album BC Nation, which was released in 1993.

Although the single peaked outside the top 100 on the ARIA Charts, the song and its video (featuring the act performing in a field of sunflowers) received renewed interest after Gina G performed at the Eurovision Song Contest 1996, prompting Mushroom Records to re-release the song and retitle Geena's billing to Gina G in 1996.

== Track listing ==
- Australian CD (1992)
1. Love the Life (Radio Edit) 4:12
2. Love the Life (Dance Mix) 6:41
3. Love the Life (Rave Edit) 3:30
4. Love the Life (Rave Remix) 7:36
5. Love the Trance Remix 5:54
- Australian CD (1996 remixes)
1. Love the Life (Radio Edit) 4:08
2. Love the Life (Club Mix) 5:43
3. Love the Life (Pee Wee's Mix) 8:54
4. Love the Life (Ivan Gough's Mix) 7:30
5. Love the Life (The Hard Life Mix) 6:53

== Charts ==
Chart (1992)	Peak position
Australia (ARIA)	130

Chart (1996)	Peak position
UK Pop Tip Club Chart (Music Week)	2
