= Monika Urban-Szabo =

Hungarian rhythmic gymnast

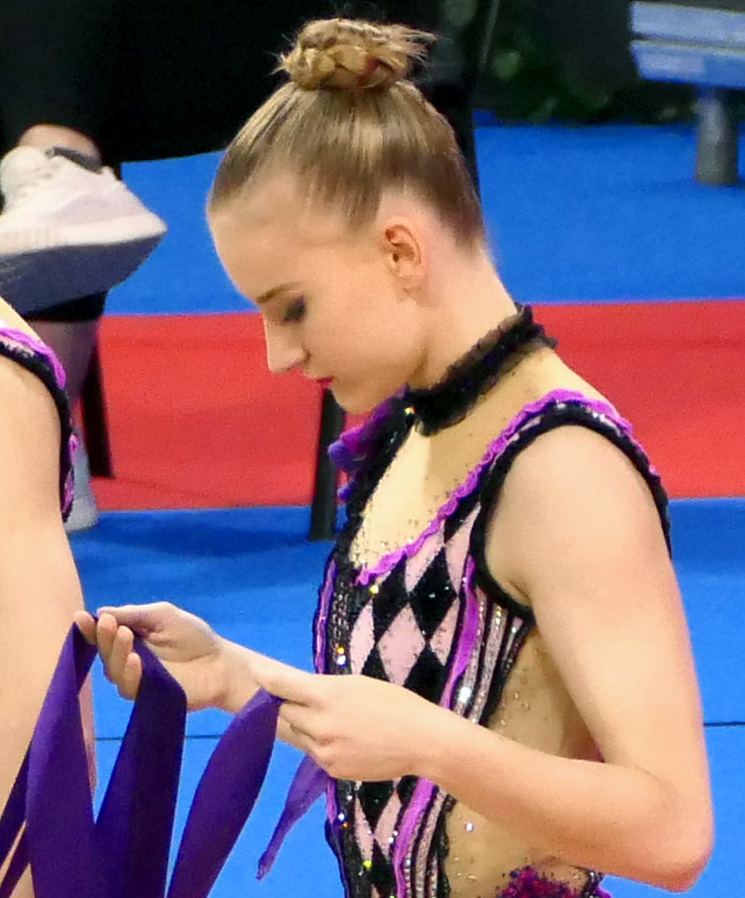

Personal information
- Born: June 8, 2003 (age 23) Budapest, Hungary

Gymnastics career
- Discipline: Rhythmic gymnastics
- Country represented: Hungary (2019-)
- Club: MTK Budapest
- Head coach: Zsofia Lauber
Medal record
Representing Hungary
Rhythmic gymnastics
Bronze medal – third place	2025 Tallinn	Group All-around
European Cup
Gold medal – first place	2025 Burgas	Cross Battle
Bronze medal – third place	2025 Burgas	5 Ribbons
Bronze medal – third place	2025 Burgas	3 Balls & 2 Hoops

Monika Urban-Szabo (born 8 June 2003) is a Hungarian rhythmic gymnast, member of the national group.

== Personal life ==
She took up rhythmic gymnastics in September 2010. In 2019 she went from being the youngest member of the Hungarian group to the oldest after the group was reformed. Her biggest dream is to compete at the Olympic Games.

== Career ==
Monika entered the national group in 2019, competing at the 2019 World Championships in Baku, finishing 21st in the All-Around, 17th with 5 balls and 23rd with 3 hoops and 4 clubs. In 2021 she competed at the World Championships in Kitakyushu along Julia Farkas, Anita Fekete, Nadin Fodor, Reka Somhegyi and Mandula Virag Meszaros where Hungary was 14th in the group All-Around and with 5 balls, 15th with 3 hoops and 4 clubs.

In 2022 she competed at the World Cup in Pamplona, ending 7th in the All-Around and with 5 hoops and 6th with 3 ribbons and 2 balls. A week later the group competed in Portimão, taking 7th place in the All-Around and 6th in the two event finals. In June she competed at the 2022 European Championships in Tel Aviv, finishing 9th in teams, 8th in the All-Around, 11th in the 5 hoops final and 8th with 3 ribbons + 2 balls. In September Monika took part in the World Championships in Sofia along Lilla Jurca, Alexa Amina Meszaros, Dora Szabados, Mandula Virag Meszaros and Lujza Varga and the individuals Fanni Pigniczki and Hanna Panna Wiesner, taking 16th place in the All-Around, 16th with 5 hoops and 15th with 3 ribbons + 2 balls.
