= Lilla Jurca =

Hungarian rhythmic gymnast

- Born: October 23, 2006 (age 19) Budapest, Hungary

Gymnastics career
- Discipline: Rhythmic gymnastics
- Country represented: Hungary (2022–present)
- Club: MTK Budapest
- Head coach: Zsofia Lauber

Lilla Jurca (born 23 October 2006) is a Hungarian rhythmic gymnast, member of the national group.

== Career ==
In 2022 Lilla was included into the national senior group, debuting at the World Cup in Pamplona, ending 7th in the All-Around and with 5 hoops and 6th with 3 ribbons and 2 balls. A week later the group competed in Portimão, taking 7th place in the All-Around and 6th in the two event finals. In June she competed at the 2022 European Championships in Tel Aviv, finishing 9th in teams, 8th in the All-Around, 11th in the 5 hoops final and 8th with 3 ribbons + 2 balls. In September Jurca took part in the World Championships in Sofia along Lujza Varga, Alexa Amina Meszaros, Dora Szabados, Mandula Virag Meszaros and Monika Urban-Szabo and the individuals Fanni Pigniczki and Hanna Panna Wiesner, taking 16th place in the All-Around, 16th with 5 hoops and 15th with 3 ribbons + 2 balls.
