= BC Nation =

- 1995 and digital release cover art

Studio album by Bass Culture
- Released: 1993
- Recorded: 1992–1993
- Studio: Studios 301, Sydney & Platinum Studios, Melbourne
- Label: MXL Music
- Producer: Peewee Ferris

Singles from BC Nation
- 1. "Love the Life" Released: 18 May 1992; 2. "You've Got a Friend" Released: July 1993; 3. "I've Leaned to Cope" Released: June 1994; 4. "Love Will Find a Way" Released: March 1995

BC Nation is the only album by short lived Australian dance group Bass Culture consisting of Mark James and David Berman. It was released in 1993 on MXL Music. In 1995, the album was re-released with a bonus disc, which saw the album peak at number 155 on the ARIA Charts.

== Singles ==
"Love the Life" was released in May 1992 as the album's lead single. It features Gina G on vocals, credited as Geena. The song peaked at number 130 on the ARIA singles chart.

A cover version of Carole King's "You've Got a Friend" was released in July 1993 as the second single. It features Kate Ceberano and peaked at number 100 on the ARIA singles chart.

"I've Leaned to Cope" was released in June 1994 as the album's third single. It features Lisa Maxwell on vocals and peaked at number 153 on the ARIA singles chart.

"Love Will Find a Way" was released in March 1995 as the album's fourth and final single. It features Suzie Ahern on vocals and peaked at number 209 on the ARIA singles chart.

== Track listing ==
BC Nation track listing
No.	Title	Writer(s)	Length
1.	"You've Got a Friend" (featuring Kate Ceberano)	Carole King	3:47
2.	"Love Will Find a Way" (featuring Suzie Ahern)	John von Ahlen, David Berman, John Collins, Wayne Mark Doyle, Mark James	5:21
3.	"So Strong" (featuring Toni Pearen)	Peewee Ferris, Lisa Maxwell	6:17
4.	"BC Nation" (featuring Ruffnek)	Berman, Doyle, James	5:33
5.	"Love the Life" (featuring Geena)	Berman, Gina Gardiner, James	3:26
6.	"Inner City" (featuring Scott Carne)	Berman, Scott Carne, Doyle, James	5:08
7.	"I've Leaned to Cope" (featuring Lisa Maxwell)	Ferris, R. Gamble, Maxwell	5:26
8.	"Echo Point"	Berman, Doyle, James	5:41
9.	"I'll Make You Happy" (featuring Geena)	Ahlen, Berman, Collins, Doyle, Gardiner, James	4:11
10.	"You've Got a Friend" (featuring Kate Ceberano) (Club mix)	King	6:49

BC Nation (Bonus disc) track listing
No.	Title	Length
1.	"I've Learned to Cope" (12" Main Mix)
2.	"Love Will Find a Way" (12" Dance Mix)
3.	"I've Learned to Cope" (Life & Love Dub)
4.	"BC Nation" (1993 Remix)
5.	"Love Will Find a Way" (All of the Way in Mix)
6.	"Love the Trance" (Original Mix)
7.	"I've Learned to Cope" (Ground Level remix)
8.	"Love the Life" (Original 1992 Dance Mix)
9.	"Love Will Find a Way" (Most of the Way in Mix)
10.	"I've Learned to Cope" (New Acid Generation Mix)
11.	"Flight of the Condor"
12.	"I've Learned to Cope" (Grinstretcher Mix)

== Charts ==
Weekly chart performance for BC Nation
Chart (1993–1995)	Peak position
Australian Albums (ARIA)	155
