= EQ Music =

British website and music blog

- Website type: Music blog, website
- Available in: English
- Owner: Raj Rudolph
- Editors: Raj Rudolph; Mandy Rogers; Luis Gonzalez
- Website: www.eqmusicblog.com
- Registration: None
- Launched: 2005; 21 years ago
- Current status: Online

EQ Music or EQ Music Blog (formerly Electroqueer.com) is an independent British music website and blog founded by American digital and music enthusiast Raj Rudolph. Alternative names include EQ and EQ Music; the site supports new electronic pop artists alongside its music reviews, features, interviews and video previews. In 2007, with the addition of New Artists Editor Mandy Rogers, the site developed into a multi-author blog; in 2013, pop blogger Luis Gonzalez joined.

In 2008, the EQ Music brand began to spoke into several entertainment related divisions including live showcasing, touring, record label and artist management; together, EQ Music's brands consolidated into a diverse international music media group.

== History ==
In 2005, digital and music enthusiast Raj Rudolph launched Electroqueer.com as a blog focused on discovering and inspiring new talent in the pop and electronic genres of music. In 2008, EQ Music Live was formed, with the subsequent formation of the EQ Music Tour in 2011.

At the 2008 Weblog Awards, Electroqueer.com was placed as a finalist in the Best Music Blog category. In 2010, Electroqueer.com changed its name, becoming EQ Music Blog. The following year, Welsh electropop duo Electrovamp won EQ Music Blog's theme song contest; the band's winning entry, "Electroqueer", became the site's official theme song and was featured on volume one of the This Beat Is Poptronik compilation album, curated by the blog.

In 2012, EQ Music announced co-sponsorship from Gaydar Radio, Budweiser and Music Jobs Ltd for the inaugural Poptronik Festival held in Spain.

In 2013, EQ Music launched its artist management division. In 2015, the brand launched on Viber Public Chats, giving app users the ability to access the blogsite's music picks and recommendations via the platform's instant messaging and Voice over IP (VoIP) software.

== Writing style and criticism ==
At its heart, EQ Music Blog describes itself as "a fun place to discover new music, watch music videos and dig deeper into the lives of the people creating quality electronic pop music, written with a fun and constructive tone." The site's editorial views have been featured in the British press (The Guardian, The Metro and The Daily Star).

In 2009, Australian blogsite PopTrashAddicts accused EQ Music of spending most of its time copying content from other pop blogs; a view EQ called a good laugh. In 2011, BBC News Online selected EQ Music's Raj Rudolph as an influential UK-based music editor and Sound of pundit, an accolade consecutively held since 2011–2015.

== Format ==
=== EQ Music Live ===
In 2008, EQ Music expanded its online artist promotion platform to include live music events showcasing both emerging and established pop and electronica artists. In blogger Oli Freke's assessment of the launch night, he wrote "great atmosphere, great crowd and great start to a new electro night."

EQ Music Live has celebrated residencies in Underbelly (Hoxton), Barcode (Soho) and Road Trip & The Workshop (Shorerditch). Artists showcased include The Good Natured, Christian Burns, Graffiti6, Polly Scattergood, Parralox, Bright Light Bright Light and Simon Curtis.

=== EQ Music Tour ===
On 4 August 2011, EQ Music announced its first North American Music Tour headlined by American electropop singer Adam Tyler. The ten state, thirteen city US tour supported Tyler's debut album, Shattered Ice (2011).

==== Tour dates ====
Date	City	Venue
August 23, 2011	New York	Splash Night Club
August 24, 2011	Chicago	Spin Night Club
August 25, 2011	Cleveland	Bounce Night Club
August 26, 2011	Pittsburgh	Cruze Bar
August 27, 2011	Charlotte	Charlotte Gay Pride
August 28, 2011	Nashville	Play Night Club
August 31, 2011	Pensacola	Emerald City Night Club
September 1, 2011	Atlanta	Jungle Night Club
September 2, 2011	Tampa	Honey Pot Night Club
September 3, 2011	Wilton Manors	Bill's Filling Station
September 4, 2011	Houston	Southbeach
September 7, 2011	Austin	Charlie's Austin Night Club
September 8, 2011	San Francisco	The Crib
September 9, 2011	San Diego	Rich's Night Club
September 10, 2011	Las Vegas	Krave Night Club

In November 2011, EQ Music sponsored Daniela Brooker as headliner for their second North American Music Tour. Working in conjunction with Hard Rock Cafe on behalf of the American Cancer Society's global Pinktober breast cancer awareness campaign, the fifteenth date live music tour began in Philadelphia (October 17) and ended in Palm Springs (November 6).

=== Poptronik albums and festival ===
In 2012, EQ Music launched the Poptronik brand which includes the This Beat Is Poptronik compilation series. On 16 April 2012, EQ Music in partnership with electropop dance label, Aztec Records released This Beat Is Poptronik - Volume One. So So Gay Magazine's Greg White commented "great quality electro-pop is exactly what we find on this huge compilation."

On 1 September 2012, Andy Bell, Fernando Garibay, Cazwell and Monarchy co-headlined EQ Music's inaugural two-day Poptronik Festival in Sitges, Spain. Gaydar Radioʼs Phil Marriott, Faithless percussionist Sudha Kheterpal and Scissor Sisters' Tour DJ – Sammy Jo were joined by a plethora of new and emerging electronic pop artists.

On 27 August 2013 EQ Music released This Beat Is Poptronik - Volume Two under its own label. The album featured Carmen Electra, Cherry Cherry Boom Boom, Frankmusik, Jessica Sutta (formerly of The Pussycat Dolls), Private, Max Barskih, Dangerous Muse and Jennifer Paige.

In 2014, the label released Adam Tyler's Shattered Ice (Deluxe Edition) and Naommon's single, "Beginning Everyday".

=== Artist management ===
In 2013, EQ Music launched its artist management operation and currently represents Australian electronic pop duo Parralox, Latin artist Ryan Adamés from Los Angeles, singer-songwriter Francine from London, New York based alternative pop artist Daniel Robinson and EDM prodigy Mi Disguise from Los Angeles.

== Accolades ==
- Electroqueer.com ranked fifth amongst Top 10 finalists of the 2008 Weblog Awards for Best Music Blog.
- EQ Music Blog founder Raj Rudolph was a guest panellist at the first ever LGBT Winter Music Conference 2013.
- EQ Music Blog ranked amongst Top 100 Music Blogs of 2015.
- EQ Music Blog founder Raj Rudolph was consecutively selected to BBC News Online's Sound of pundit list of influential online music editors between 2011 and 2015.
