= Lisa Maxwell (singer, songwriter) =

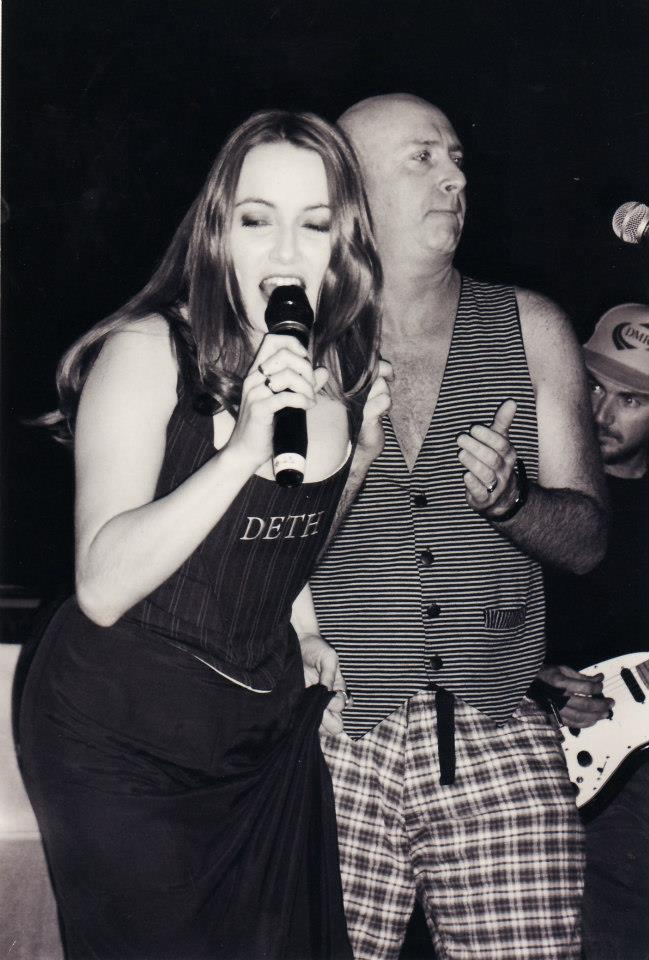
- Lisa performing at Kinsellas, Stand My Ground EP Launch 1993

Background information
- Born: Lisa Maxwell
- Genres: Pop
- Occupations: Singer-songwriter, performer, session musician
- Instrument: Vocals
- Years active: 1989–present
- Labels: Dance Pool, MDS

Lisa Maxwell is an Australian singer-songwriter who began her career doing backing vocals for acts such as Kate Ceberano, and Wendy Matthews as well as working in the Australian dance music scene, featuring on albums by Ground Level, Severed Heads and Boxcar. She later signed with Sony/ATV Music Publishing... and released her first EP "Stand My Ground" followed by the release of her first album Wish through Sony Music sub label Dance Pool

== Career ==
Maxwell started her career working with Kate Ceberano and recorded backing vocals on the Kate Ceberano's 1991 album Think About It! and for Wendy Matthews.

Maxwell signed a deal with Sony/ATV Music Publishing and released her first independent record in 1993 through MDS (Mushroom Distribution Services) titled '"Stand My Ground".

In 1994, Maxwell's featured on "I've Learned to Cope" with Bass Culture for their BC Nation album. It peaked at number 153 on the ARIA singles chart. It featured on the Australian film The Sum of Us starring Jack Thompson and Russell Crowe.

In 1994 Maxwell was a Sony Music featured artist at Midem, a music industry event held in Cannes and at the time administered by Export Music Australia (EMA).

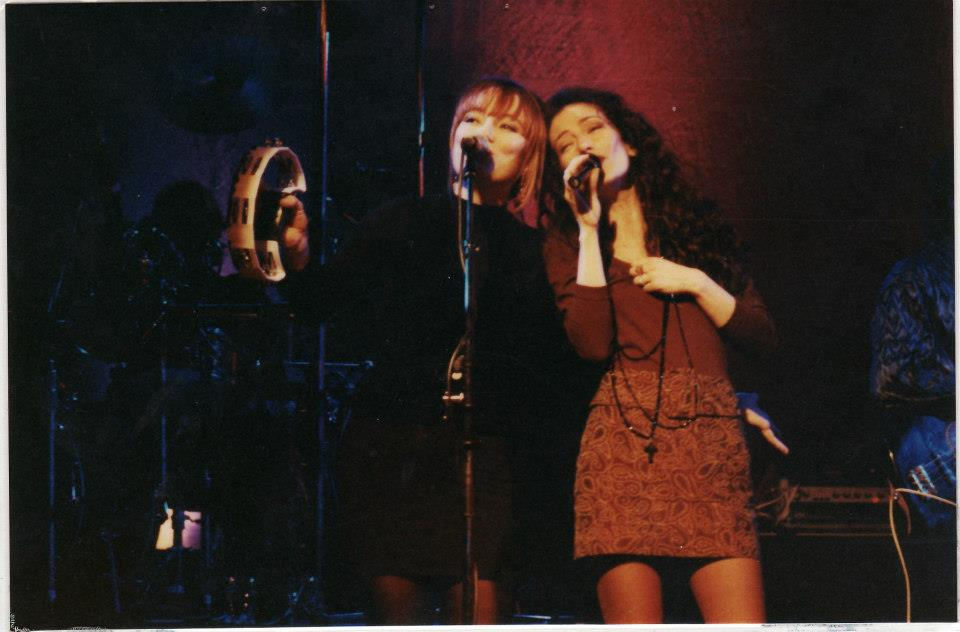
Maxwell performing with Wendy Mathews

Maxwell released her original album Wish with Australian dance producers Pee Wee Ferris and Groove Terminator worked on. Two tracks from the album, covers of Sister Sledge song "Thinking of You" and George McCrae song "Rock Your Baby" both appeared in Tokyo's J-WAVE radio charts. "Thinking of you" at number 8 and "Rock Your Baby" number 15 "Thinking of you" also charted in New Zealand reaching number 50 on the Official New Zealand Music Chart. She also released a third single off the album "Falling Back to You" which was featured on an episode of Australian television soap opera Neighbours.

== Discography ==
=== Albums ===
List of Albums, with selected details
| Title | Details |
|---|---|
| Wish | Released: 1998; Format: CD; Label: Dancepool |
| Let It Rain | Released: February 2017; Format: digital; Label: CrippTic |

=== Singles ===
List of singles, with selected chart positions
| Title | Year | Chart positions | |
| Title | Year | AUS | NZ |
|---|---|---|---|
| "Stand My Ground" | 1993 | - | - |
| "I've Leaned to Cope" (Bass Culture featuring Lisa Maxwell) | 1994 | 153 | - |
| "Thinking of You" | 1996 | - | 50 |
| "Rock Your Baby" | 1997 | - | - |
| "Falling Back to You" | 1998 | - | - |
