= Gina G =

Australian singer (born 1970)

- Born: Gina Mary Gardiner; 3 August 1970 (age 56); Brisbane, Queensland, Australia
- Origin: London, England
- Genres: Pop; Eurodance; electronic; EDM; techno
- Years active: 1990–1998, 2003–2011
- Labels: Warner Bros; Stunt Girl Music; WEA; Discipline Music

Gina G (born Gina Mary Gardiner, 3 August 1970) is an Australian former singer. She is most notable for her song "Ooh Aah... Just a Little Bit", with which she represented the United Kingdom in the Eurovision Song Contest 1996. The song reached number 1 in the UK Singles Chart and reached the US top 20 in 1997. In 1998, she received a nomination at the 40th Annual Grammy Awards for Best Dance Recording for the song.

Her other UK Top 30 hits are "I Belong to You" (number 6 in 1996), "Fresh" (number 6 in 1997), "Ti Amo" (number 11 in 1997) and "Gimme Some Love" (number 25 in 1997). Her last new activity in the music industry was a song release in 2011; she was then in a long lawsuit with a former talent manager that prevented her from releasing new material.

== Career ==
=== Early 1990s ===
During the early 1990s, Gina G was a disc jockey in Melbourne and a singer in Bass Culture, an Australian dance music group. She sang on Bass Culture's single "Love the Life", which was released in Australia in May 1992.

=== Mid- to late 1990s ===
In 1995, she moved to the UK, where she entered the A Song for Europe competition. She won, becoming the UK's entry in the Eurovision Song Contest 1996, with the song "Ooh Aah... Just a Little Bit". The song finished in eighth place at Eurovision, and peaked at number one on the UK Singles Chart. The song was also successful in the US, reaching No. 12 on the Billboard Hot 100, No. 3 on the Hot Dance Club Play, No. 13 on the Rhythmic Top 40, No. 5 on the Mainstream Top 40, No. 25 on the Adult Top 40 and No. 11 on the Hot Dance Music/Maxi-Singles Sales chart. The song was nominated for a Grammy Award in the Best Dance Recording category in 1998.

Gina G released "I Belong to You" in October 1996, which was also a top-10 hit in the UK. The following year, she scored a succession of UK hits with "Fresh!", "Ti Amo", "Gimme Some Love", and "Everytime I Fall", all of which were included on her debut album Fresh! The album's cover was shot by David LaChapelle and featured her whole body covered in chocolate. "Gimme Some Love" was also a hit in the US, reaching No. 46 on the Billboard Hot 100, No. 18 on both the Hot Dance Music/Club Play and Hot Dance Music/Maxi-Singles Sales charts, and No. 22 on the Top 40 Mainstream chart.

In 1998, Gina G and songwriter Simon Tauber sued record company FX Music and its owner, Steve Rodway, demanding £136,000 among other things. In February 1999, a high court voided her recording contract after finding that she received less than £30,000 in royalties from the song. A legal battle with her former manager was stuck in court for 10 years and prevented her from releasing another album.

=== 2000s ===
By 2000, she recorded several songs with Swedish producers Lagoona, including a new version of her debut hit "Ooh Aah... Just a Little Bit", and a cover version of Nancy Sinatra's "These Boots Are Made for Walkin'".

In March 2003, she took part in the reality television show Reborn in the USA, alongside Sonia, Michelle Gayle, Tony Hadley, Peter Cox and Elkie Brooks. Even though she received the most votes from the American audience and won the first show, she got the fewest votes in the next show, and went up for the British public's vote. She lost, and was eliminated from the show in the third programme.

In early 2005, Gina G attempted to represent the United Kingdom at the Eurovision Song Contest, but she finished last out of five entries on the pre-selection program with her song "Flashback". She competed against Javine Hylton and Katie Price.

In August 2005, she released her second (and final) album, Get Up & Dance only through her website. It was released via iTunes in March 2009.

In June 2006, her debut album, Fresh!, became available for download on iTunes. She set up her own record label, Stuntgirl, with distribution through Universal Records.

In late 2006, she released a single, "Tonight's the Night" and promoted it in clubs. It peaked on the commercial dance chart at No. 2. It was released on 2 October through download and larger music stores. The single peaked at No. 57 on the UK Singles Chart on 8 October.

=== 2010s ===
Gina G released "Next 2 You" on 27 May 2011 via iTunes Australia. It was written by Gina G, Billy Pace, Duane Morrison, and John Collins. Remixes featuring rapper Vigilante were released in November 2011. A planned second single called "Set the Night on Fire" was scheduled for early 2012 and a music video was planned, but were never released.

=== 2020s ===
In May 2024, Fresh! was re-released on purple vinyl and double CD/DVD versions by 90/9 Records.

== Discography ==
Gina G discography
- Studio albums: 2
- Singles: 11
- Remix albums: 1

=== Studio albums ===
Title	Details	Peak chart positions			Certifications
Title	Details	AUS	NOR	UK	Certifications
Fresh!	Released: 1997; Label: Eternal (0630-17840-2); Format: CD, cassette	53	40	12	BPI: Gold
Get Up & Dance	Released: 2005; Label: G-Force Music; Format: CD, DD	—	—	—	

=== Remix albums ===
Title	Details
Remix Album	Released: December 1998 (Japan); Label: WEA (WPCR-2296); Format: CD

=== Singles ===
Year	Title	Chart positions										Certifications	Album
Year	Title	AUS	CAN Dance	FIN	GER	IRE	NOR	SWE	UK	US	US Dance	Certifications	Album
1992	"Love the Life" (with Bass Culture)	130	—	—	—	—	—	—	—	—	—		BC Nation
1996	"Ooh Aah... Just a Little Bit"	5	2	6	88	6	5	6	1	12	4	ARIA: Gold; BPI: Gold	Fresh!
1996	"I Belong to You"	34	21	18	—	16	—	24	6	—	—		Fresh!
1997	"Fresh!"	23	—	—	83	29	—	—	6	—	—		Fresh!
1997	"Ti Amo"	113	—	—	—	—	—	—	11	—	—		Fresh!
1997	"Gimme Some Love"	121	8	—	—	—	—	—	25	46	18		Fresh!
1997	"Every Time I Fall"	144	—	—	—	—	—	—	52	—	—		Fresh!
2004	"Just a Little Bit" (2004 remix)	—	—	—	—	—	—	—	—	—	—		Non-album single
2005	"Flashback"	—	—	—	—	—	—	—	—	—	—		Get Up & Dance
2006	"Tonight's the Night"	—	—	—	—	—	—	—	57	—	—		Non-album singles
2011	"Next 2 U"	—	—	—	—	—	—	—	—	—	—		Non-album singles
"—" denotes releases that did not chart or were not released in that country.

== Awards and nominations ==
=== ARIA Music Awards ===
The ARIA Music Awards is an annual awards ceremony that recognises excellence, innovation, and achievement across all genres of Australian music. They commenced in 1987.

Year	Nominee / work	Award	Result	Ref.
1997	"(Ooh Aah) Just a Little Bit"	Breakthrough Artist - Single	Nominated	

== See also ==
- United Kingdom in the Eurovision Song Contest 1996

Awards and achievements
Preceded by Love City Groove with "Love City Groove"	UK in the Eurovision Song Contest; 1996	Succeeded by Katrina and the Waves with "Love Shine a Light"
