= Fanni Pigniczki =

Hungarian rhythmic gymnast

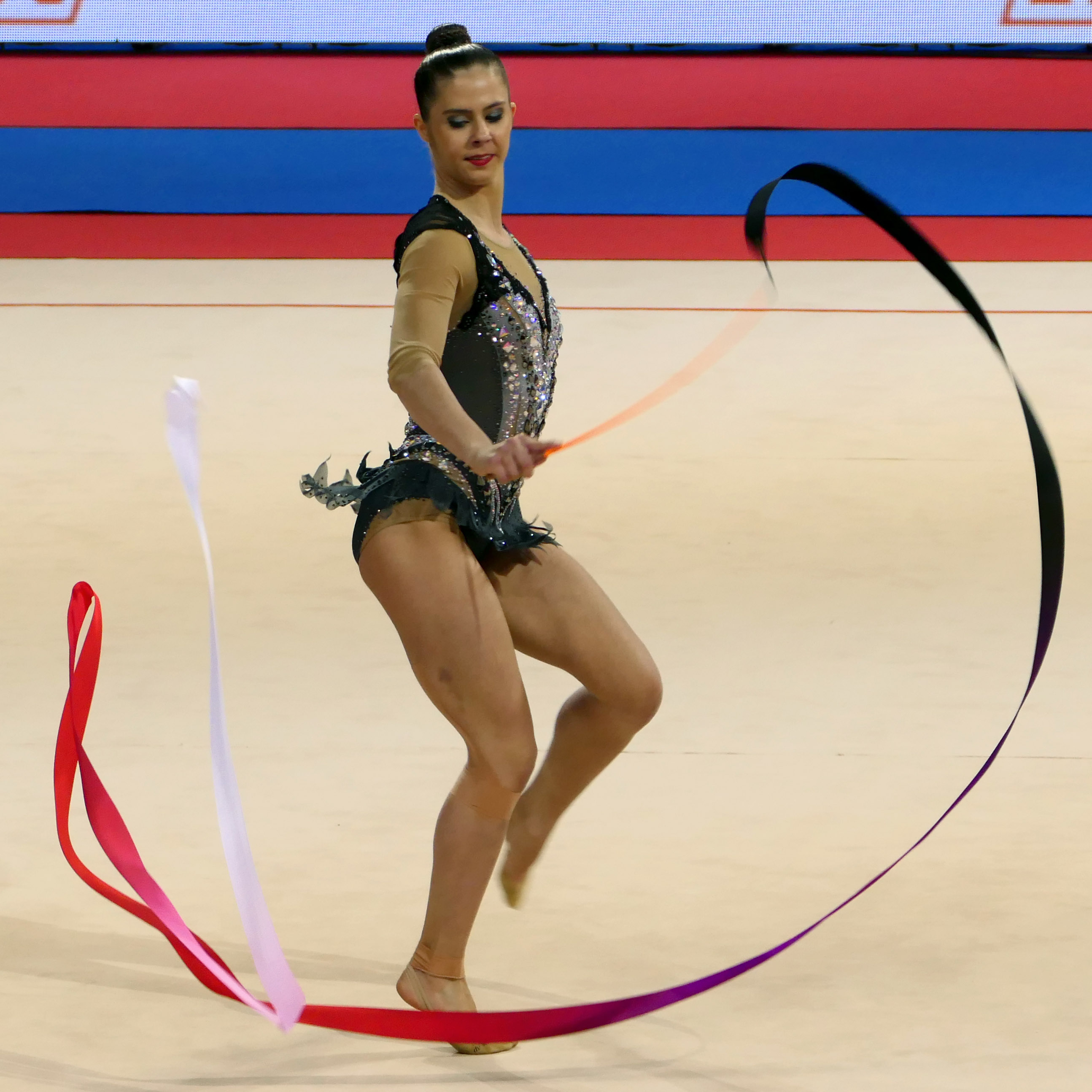
- Pigniczki in 2024

Personal information
- Full name: Fanni Pigniczki
- Born: 23 January 2000 (age 26) Budapest, Hungary
- Height: 170 cm (5 ft 7 in)

Gymnastics career
- Discipline: Rhythmic gymnastics
- Country represented: Hungary; (2017-)
- College team: Hungarian University of Physical Education and Sports Science
- Club: MTK Budapest
- Head coaches: Erika Deutsch-Lazsányi, Noémi Gelle
Medal record
Event	1st	2nd	3rd
World Championships	0	0	1
World Games	0	0	2
FIG World Cup	0	1	2
European Championships	0	1	0
Summer Universiade	2	0	2
Total	2	2	7
Representing Hungary
Rhythmic Gymnastics
World Championships
Bronze medal – third place	2023 Valencia	Hoop
European Championships
Silver medal – second place	2024 Budapest	Ball
World Games
Bronze medal – third place	2022 Birmingham	Hoop
Bronze medal – third place	2022 Birmingham	Ball
Summer Universiade
Gold medal – first place	2021 Chengdu	All-around
Gold medal – first place	2021 Chengdu	Ball
Bronze medal – third place	2025 Rhine-Rhur	All-around
Bronze medal – third place	2025 Rhine-Rhur	Hoop

Fanni Pigniczki (born 23 January 2000) is a Hungarian rhythmic gymnast. She competed at the 2020 Tokyo and the 2024 Paris Olympic Games.

== Personal life ==
Her mother is a psychologist and her father was a table tennis player who represented Hungary at international competitions. Her grandfather is László Pigniczki, a World silver medalist in table tennis.

She graduated with a master's degree in rhythmic gymnastics coaching from the Hungarian University of Sports Science in 2023 and has been studying for a psychology degree at Károli Gáspár University of the Reformed Church in Hungary since 2022.

== Career ==
She began rhythmic gymnastics when she was five years old. Pigniczki joined the Hungarian national team when she was twelve.

=== 2017-2021 Olympic cycle ===
Pigniczki competed at the 2017 World Championships, where she finished 32nd in the qualification round with a total score of 55.950.

In 2018, she finished 16th in the all-around at the European Championships with a score of 64.220. She also competed at the 2018 World Championships and finished 58th in the qualification round.

She competed for Hungary at the 2019 European Games and came in 12th in the all-around final. At the 2019 World Championships, she competed alongside Blanka Boldizsar, Anna Juhasz, and Emma Juhasz, and they finished 20th as a team. Pigniczki qualified for the all-around final, where she finished 23rd with a score of 75.500.

She competed at the 2020 European Championships and ended in 11th place in the all-around.

At the 2021 European Championships, Pigniczki qualified to the 2020 Summer Olympics, becoming the first Hungarian rhythmic gymnast to qualify to an Olympic Games since Viktória Fráter in 2000. At the Olympics, she finished twentieth in the qualification round for the individual all-around.

=== 2022-2024 Olympic cycle ===
In early 2022, she broke her leg when she stepped on her ball during training and had to take six weeks off from training. In June, she competed at the European Championships in Tel Aviv despite not having much time to train beforehand due to her injury. In the qualifying round, she was 19th, and she rose to 14th in the all-around final, which she said was due to being much less nervous during the final. On August 28, 2022, Picniczki became the first Hungarian gymnast to win a World Cup medal by winning bronze with ribbon in Cluj-Napoca.

The next month, at the World Championships, she qualified to the all-around final and ended in 9th place. With this placement, she tied for best placement by a Hungarian gymnast at the World Championships; Andrea Sinkó had previously also placed 9th at the 1987 World Championships. She also qualified for the ribbon final, making her the first Hungarian gymnast to qualify for an apparatus final in 25 years after Viktória Fráter did so in 1997. However, she came in 8th place in the final after she had a knot in her ribbon and had to take the spare apparatus.

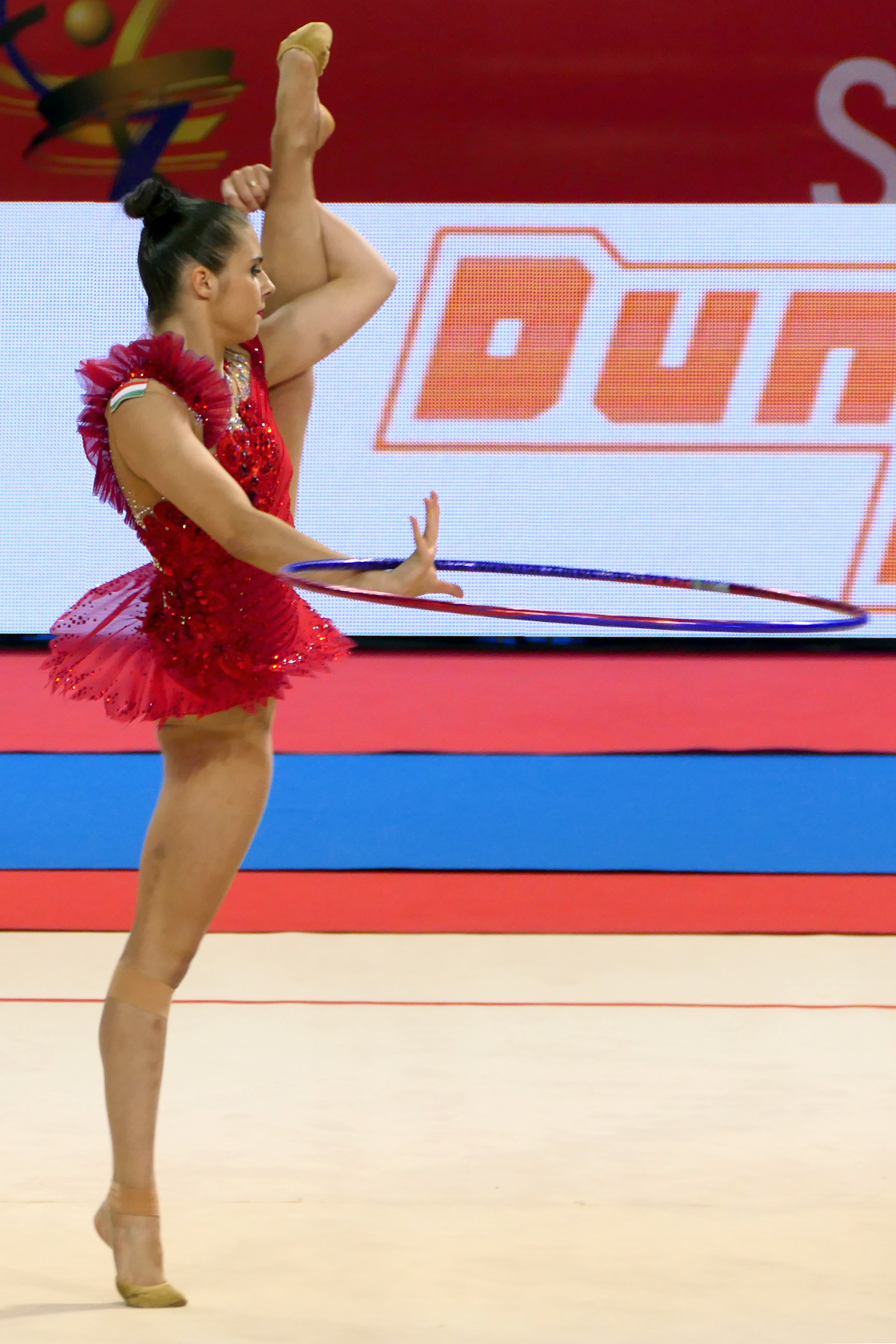
Pigniczki performing a turn at the 2024 Sofia World Cup

The 2023 European Championships were Picniczki's tenth. She came in 16th in the all-around final. In the apparatus finals, she was 5th with ball and 7th with hoop. She was also awarded the Shooting Star award for her continuous improvement over her years of competing.

In August, she competed at the Summer Universiade in Chengdu. She won gold in the all-around and with ball, making her the first rhythmic gymnast from her country to win gold at that competition. Later that months, she won bronze with hoop at the World Championships in Valencia, the first medal for Hungary since Maria Patocska in 1973. Pignickzi also placed high enough in the qualification round to win a berth for Hungary at the 2024 Summer Olympics.

In 2024, Pigniczki competed at the World Cup in Sofia, where she placed 20th. She next competed at the World Cup in Tashkent. There she was 5th in the all-around and qualified to three event finals: ball and ribbon, both of which she placed 6th in, and hoop, where she was 4th.

At the European Championships, she placed 8th, her best-ever placement at that competition. In the ball final, she won a silver medal with a personal best score. It was the first time a gymnast representing Hungary had won an individual medal at the European Championships.

In August, she competed at the 2024 Summer Olympics. In the qualification round, she came in twelfth and did not advance to the final. It was the best result for a Hungarian rhythmic gymnast since the 1988 Summer Olympics. She said that she was overall satisfied with her performance and that she was glad to have qualified for two Olympics.

=== 2025-2028 Olympic cycle ===
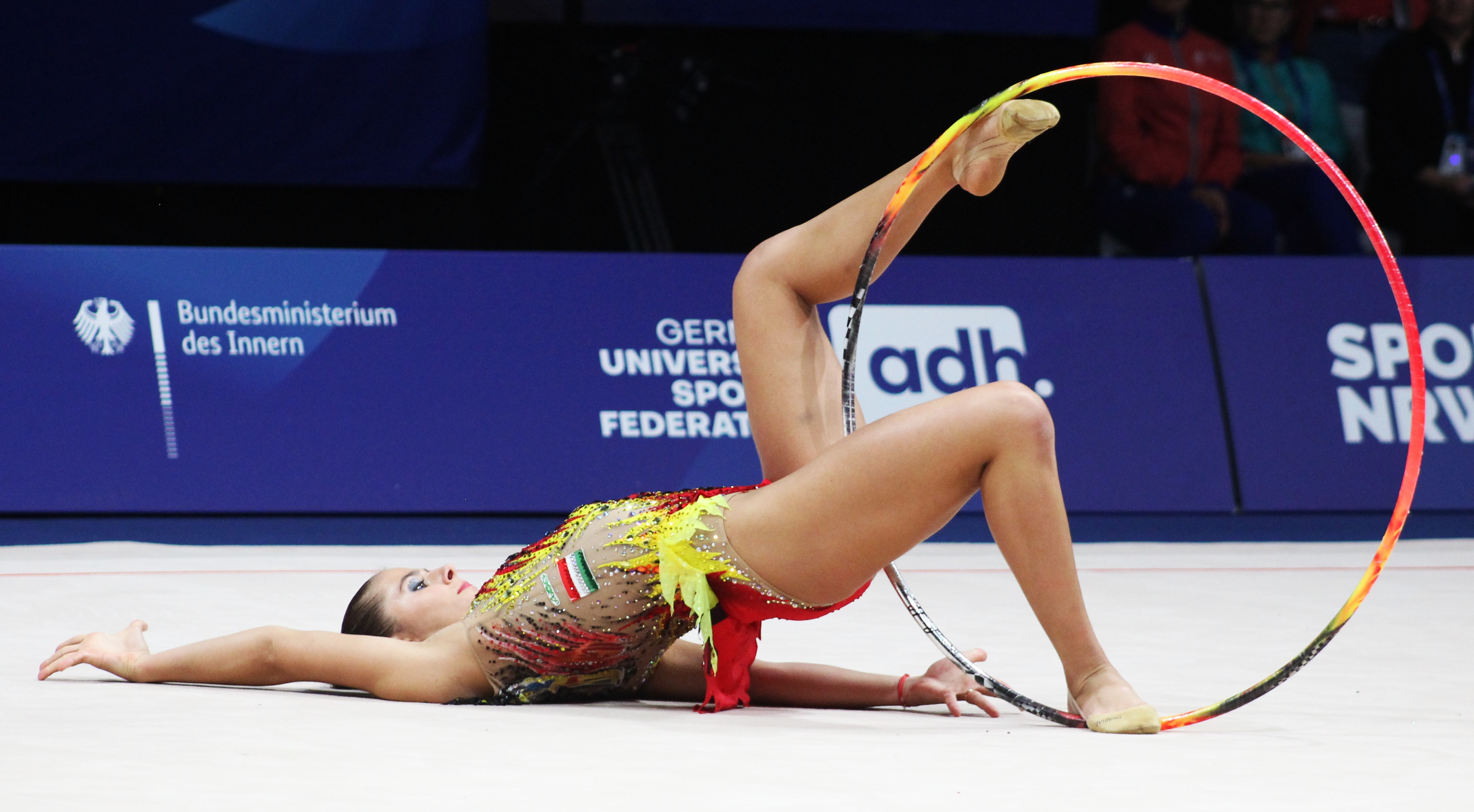
Pigniczki at the 2025 Summer World University Games

In 2025, she competed at Tashkent World Cup in April. She was 6th in the all-around and qualified to the hoop and ball finals, finishing 8th in both. In June, Pigniczki represented Hungary together with Hanna Panna Wiesner at the 2025 European Championships in Tallinn, Estonia. She placed 20th in the all-around final. In July, she competed at the 2025 Summer Universiade and won the bronze medal in the all-around.

In August, she represented Hungary alongside Hanna Panna Wiesner and Luca Lovász at the 2025 World Championships in Rio de Janeiro, Brazil. She took 32nd place in all-around qualifications and did not advance into the all-around final. Later, she revealed that she was in a lot of pain during preparations for the World Championships. Upon returning to Hungary, doctors discovered she had a fractured rib.

In 2026, she began her season by competing at Grand Prix Marbella, where she took 14th place in the all-around and 7th place in the ball final. In April, she competed at the Baku World Cup and took 26th place in the all-around. She next competed at the Tashkent World Cup, where she finished in 16th and almost qualified to hoop final (10th place). In May, she competed at the European Cup in Baku and lost in round 1 of the cross battles against Arina Kovshova with ball. She was 7th in ball and 8th in ribbon. In June, she was 40th in the all-around at Milan World Cup.

In August, she represented Hungary at the 2026 World Championships in Frankfurt, Germany. This was her 8th World Championships. She took 36th place in the all-around qualifications and was most successful with ball (14th place).

In October, she competed at the International tournament Aura Cup in Croatia and won the silver medal in the all-around behind Sofia Ilteriakova.

== Achievements ==
- First Hungarian rhythmic gymnast to win a medal in an individual apparatus final at the FIG World Cup series.
- First Hungarian rhythmic gymnast to win a silver medal in an individual apparatus final at the FIG World Cup series.
- First Hungarian rhythmic gymnast to win a medal in an individual apparatus final at the World Games.
- First Hungarian rhythmic gymnast to win a medal in an individual apparatus final at the Summer University Games.
- First Hungarian rhythmic gymnast to win a medal at the World Championships since 1973.
- First Hungarian rhythmic gymnast to win a medal at the European Championships.

== Routine music information ==
Year	Apparatus	Music title
2016	Hoop	Hallelujah by Rob Landes
2016	Ball	Carnavalera by Havana Delirio
2016	Clubs	Codigo de Barra by Bajofondo
2016	Ribbon	The Cello Song by The Piano Guys
2017	Hoop	Hallelujah by Rob Landes
2017	Ball	Out in the Cold by Asaf Avidan & The Mojos
2017	Clubs	NEW DORP. NEW YORK by SBTRKT feat. Ezra Koenig
2017	Ribbon	The Cello Song by The Piano Guys
2018	Hoop	Coming Home by HAVASI
2018	Ball	Out in the Cold by Asaf Avidan & The Mojos
2018	Clubs	NEW DORP. NEW YORK by SBTRKT feat. Ezra Koenig
2018	Ribbon	The Cello Song by The Piano Guys
2019	Hoop	Coming Home by Havasi Balazs
2019	Ball	Say You Won't Let Go by James Arthur
2019	Clubs	Ooh Aah... Just A Little Bit by Gina G
2019	Ribbon	Ameksa (District 78 Remix) by Taalbi Brothers
2020	Hoop	Ninja by Maxime Rodriguez
2020	Ball	One Moment in Time by Whitney Houston
2020	Clubs	Ooh Aah... Just A Little Bit by Gina G
2020	Ribbon	Ameksa (District 78 Remix) by Taalbi Brothers
2021	Hoop	Ninja by Maxime Rodriguez
2021	Ball	One Moment in Time by Whitney Houston
2021	Clubs	Ooh Aah... Just a Little Bit by Gina G.
2021	Ribbon	Ameksa (District 78 Remix) by Taalbi Brothers
2022	Hoop	Hypnotic Tango (VIZE Edit) by Alex Christensen & The Berlin Orchestra
2022	Ball	Uccen (DWTS Remix) by Taalbi Brothers
2022	Clubs	Street Of Sorrow by HAVASI
2022	Ribbon	Scat by Club des Belugas & Iain Mackenzie
2023	Hoop	On Then And Now by Woodkid (feat. Jennifer Connelly)
2023	Ball	Uccen (DWTS Remix) by Taalbi Brothers
2023	Clubs	Insomnia by Symphoniacs
2023	Ribbon	Scat by Club des Belugas & Iain Mackenzie
2024	Hoop	On Then And Now by Woodkid (feat. Jennifer Connelly)
2024	Ball	Hit the Road Jack
2024	Clubs	Grace Kelly by Mika
2024	Ribbon	Higher by Michael Bublé
2025	Hoop	
2025	Ball	Duck Duck Goose by Power-Haus, Joni Fuller
2025	Clubs	Opening: I Hope I Get It by A Chorus Line Ensemble
2025	Ribbon	Oh Saint Stephen / Rebirth by Havasi
