= Ooh Aah... Just a Little Bit =

1996 single by Gina G

- Standard artwork

Single by Gina G

from the album Fresh!
- Released: 25 March 1996
- Genre: Eurodance; hi-NRG
- Length: 3:24 (Motiv8 radio edit); 3:03 (Eurovision version)
- Label: Eternal; Warner Bros.
- Composer: Steve Rodway
- Lyricist: Simon Tauber
- Producer: Steve Rodway

Gina G singles chronology
| "Love the Life" (1992) | "Ooh Aah... Just a Little Bit" (1996) | "I Belong to You" (1996) |

Audio video
- "Ooh Aah... Just a Little Bit" on YouTube

Eurovision Song Contest 1996 entry
- Country: United Kingdom
- Artist: Gina G
- Language: English
- Composer: Steve Rodway
- Lyricist: Simon Tauber
- Conductor: Ernie Dunstall

Finals performance
- Final result: 8th
- Final points: 77

Entry chronology
- ◄ "Love City Groove" (1995)
- "Love Shine a Light" (1997) ►

Official performance video
- "Ooh Aah... Just a Little Bit" (grand final) on YouTube

"Ooh Aah... Just a Little Bit" is a song recorded by Australian singer and songwriter Gina G, with music composed by Steve Rodway and lyrics written by Simon Tauber. It was her debut solo single, and it was released on 25 March 1996 by Eternal and Warner Bros. Records as the first single from her debut album, Fresh! (1997). It represented the United Kingdom in the Eurovision Song Contest 1996, held in Oslo, where it finished in eighth place.

"Ooh Aah... Just a Little Bit" topped the UK singles chart in May 1996, peaked at No. 12 on the US Billboard Hot 100, and was nominated for Best Dance Recording at the 40th Annual Grammy Awards in 1998. It is also the fourth-highest charting Eurovision entry in the US, behind "Nel blu dipinto du blu (Volare)" (1958), "Waterloo" (1974) and "Eres tú" (1973); it remained the last Eurovision entry to chart in the US until "Arcade", the 2019 winning entry in 2021. It became the first UK entry to top the UK singles chart for 15 years, and also remains the last UK Eurovision entry to top the UK singles chart.

== Background ==
=== Conception ===
"Ooh Aah... Just a Little Bit" was composed by Steve Rodway with lyrics by Simon Tauber.

=== National selection ===
On 1–8 March 1996, "Ooh Aah... Just a Little Bit" performed by Gina G competed in The Great British Song Contest 1996, the national selection organised by the British Broadcasting Corporation (BBC) to select its song and performer for the 41st edition of the Eurovision Song Contest. The song won the competition, becoming the British entrant –and Gina G performer– for Eurovision.

Gina G released the song as her debut solo single on 25 March 1996 and as the first single from her debut album, Fresh! (1997).

=== Eurovision ===
On 18 May 1996, the Eurovision Song Contest final was held at the Oslo Spektrum in Oslo hosted by Norsk rikskringkasting (NRK) and broadcast live throughout the continent. Gina G performed "Ooh Aah... Just a Little Bit" performed second in a field of twenty-three songs being preceded by the Turkish entry "Beşinci Mevsim", with the Spanish entry "¡Ay, qué deseo!" following. Conductor Ernie Dunstall orchestrated and conducted the British entrant on stage with a minimal orchestral accompaniment. A tiny string accompaniment was added to the backing track produced by Rodway. Two female dancers dressed in pink and yellow backed up Gina G, dressed in a short thigh-skimming glittery metal dress. The dress was originally custom made for Cher by Paco Rabanne, but she left it unused hanging in the offices at Warner Bros. Records until Gina G stumbled across it just a few days before the contest. The dress was then shortened slightly for her performance. As the rules required every instrument used on the backing track to appear on stage, and as the backing track used relied heavily on computer generated sounds and techno beats, two Apple Mac personal computers were on the stage—one beside each synthesizer.

At the close of voting, "Ooh Aah... Just a Little Bit" had received 77 points, receiving the maximum 12 points from two countries: Portugal and Belgium. It finished in 8th place overall, the winner being Ireland with "The Voice" by Eimear Quinn. The result led to a big overhaul in the contest's voting system, with the introduction of televoting in several participating countries the following year, a practice rolled out across the board in 1998.

== Reception ==
=== Critical reception ===
Scottish Aberdeen Evening Express named the song a "slice of cheesy Europop", adding that "you'll grow to either love or hate it!" AllMusic editor Stephen Thomas Erlewine praised it as a "great guilty pleasure". A reviewer from Austin American-Statesman called it "perky". J. D. Considine from The Baltimore Sun said that from its Moog-style synthesizer hook to the galloping electrobeats that drive the chorus, Gina G's "Ooh Aah... Just a Little Bit" "is clearly a throwback to the sort of synth-pop that owned the airwaves in the late '80s." Larry Flick from Billboard magazine wrote that "adorable Australian ingénue" has already enjoyed significant pop success throughout Europe with this "instantly infectious hi-NRG dance ditty. It's easy to predict this single scoring similarly high marks here, thanks in large part to her kewpiedoll vocals and the song's tasty, sugarcoated melody. You'll be singing along to the song's chorus before the track's close, while a bevy of meaty remixes will have you happily twitching around the room." Richard Paton from The Blade complimented it as a "smash", that "kicks off" the album of "vibrant dance pop". Swedish Expressen and Göteborgs-Tidningen described it as a "sticky yummy pop pastry" and a "danceable naughty pop song".

L.A. Weekly wrote that it's "an expert confection of interlocking speed-stuttered repetitious-trance electro-breakdance beats, above which Gina G breathily metronomes too-childlike-to-be-suggestive "ooh ahh"s as if she were a Kit-Cat clock ticking and tocking its way to the bank, its Cheshire smile bursting with catnip." Richard Smith from Melody Maker named it Single of the Week and "easily the best Eurovision song since 'Waterloo'". He also said, "A Euro anthem for Eurovision!! How excellent. This is shiny, happy, bouncy and brilliant idiot pop with those galloping Motiv8 rhythms". Music Week gave the song a score of four out of five, adding that its "immediacy, jollity and credibility should stand it in good stead." NME described it as a "frenzy of techno-friendly tunefulness", remarking its "unshakeable" chorus. People Magazine noted that Gina G is adding a "dusky undercurrent and a teasing touch of sultriness" to the song. John Everson from SouthtownStar felt it should be the "dance club sensation of the year", describing it as "a pure hair-flipping bit of flirting, teasing fun. This is just the sort of fodder to form into a perfect pop hit". He also complimented its "Erasure-esque galloping beat". Charles Aaron from Spin called the song a "synthy magic carpet that flies nonstop to flashy, trashy Miami discos where they sell drinks with names like 'Call a Cab'."

=== Retrospective response ===
In 2012, "Ooh Aah... Just a Little Bit" was ranked No. 45 in NME's list of the "50 Best-Selling Tracks of the 90s", adding that the song sold 790,000. In 2017, Billboard ranked it No. 35 in their list of "The 100 Greatest Pop Songs of 1997", writing, "Bubblegum pop at punk rock speeds, Gina G's lone brush with the mainstream was a B-12 shot that verged on happy hardcore, but whose bpm managed to stay just on the right side of cartoonish. And wow, that synth riff, a live wire running throughout the song, punishing in its uncontrolled effervescence." Same year, BuzzFeed ranked the song No. 25 in their list of "The 101 Greatest Dance Songs of the '90s". In a 2020 review, Can't Stop the Pop described it as a "rollicking tour-de-force" and "relentless, dizzying rush from start to finish". They stated that "the timing of 'Ooh Aah…Just A Little Bit' was perfect; it bottled the Eurodance sound of the early '90s and siphoned it down into a traditionally structured pop song."

In 2013, Tom Ewing of Freaky Trigger called it a "glossy hi-tack" song, adding further, "It's brisk, good-quality bubblegum: a springy keyboard part, a chugging rhythm, and a few fine lines – Every night makes me hate the days – laid down with enough conviction to cross the line between corny and effective." In another 2020 review, Pop Rescue complimented it as "incredibly catchy". In 2014, The Quietus named the song one of "50 Favourite Guilt-Free Pleasures". An editor, Dan Barrow, wrote that the song "enters the realms of unguilty pleasure mostly through its chorus, where the vocal drops registers of excitement to an almost-whisper, just as the arpeggios hit their peaks of Euro-trance intensity, the memory of house piano – the signifier of anticipation and release – leaking through the chorus. The high, almost toxic sheen of its opening fanfare of notes, a gateway drug to more louche pleasures."

== Chart performance ==
"Ooh Aah... Just a Little Bit" was a notable hit in Europe, Latin America, Southeast Asia and Australia. It was scheduled for release in 13 territories around the world. The song entered the UK Singles Chart at No. 6 on 31 March 1996 and rose to No. 2 two weeks later. The song spent another five weeks in the top three, climbing to No. 1 during its eighth week, the day after Gina G's performance at Eurovision, and would spend a further 15 weeks in the top 75. As of 2026, the song is the last UK Eurovision entry to peak atop the country's chart. It was a top-five hit in Australia, Denmark, Hungary, and Norway, as well as a top-10 hit in the Czech Republic, Estonia, Finland, Flanders, Ireland and Sweden. On the Eurochart Hot 100, "Ooh Aah... Just a Little Bit" peaked at No. 9 in June 1996.

The song was also successful in the United States, a rarity for Eurovision entries. Released in the US in November 1996, it peaked at No. 12 on the Billboard Hot 100 in February 1997 and spent a total of 30 weeks on the Hot 100. It also reached No. 13 on the Top 40/Rhythm-Crossover chart, No. 5 on the Top 40/Mainstream chart, No. 25 on the Adult Top 40, No. 4 on the Dance Club Play chart, and No. 11 on the Maxi-Singles Sales chart. It is the fourth-highest charting Eurovision entry in the US, behind "Nel blu dipinto du blu (Volare)" (No. 1 in 1958), "Waterloo" (No. 6 in 1974) and "Eres tú" (No. 9 in 1974); it remained the last Eurovision entry to chart in the US until "Arcade", the 2019 winning entry (No. 30 in 2021). In West Asia, "Ooh Aah... Just a Little Bit" became a successful number-one hit in Israel, peaking at the top position in its fourth week on the chart, on 14 May. It spent seven weeks inside the Israeli top 30.

== Music video ==
The song's music video was directed by Fruit Salad with photography directed by Peter Sinclair. It features Gina G with three background female dancers performing in a passageway with a brightly lit ceiling, teasing a pair of well-dressed guys. The song's lyrics are used in a sexually suggestive, but playful manner. While it had airtime on several music video channels globally, the video would also be the first song to be "banned" after being voted on by MTV's 12 Angry Viewers in 1998, despite never receiving much airtime on the US channel. MTV's sister channel VH1 gave the video more moderate airplay time.

== Track listings ==
- UK CD1 and Australian CD single
1. "Ooh Aah... Just a Little Bit" (Motiv8 radio edit) – 3:24
2. "Ooh Aah... Just a Little Bit" (Motiv8 extended vocal mix) – 6:43
3. "Ooh Aah... Just a Little Bit" (The Next Room's Rip 'Em Up mix) – 6:08
4. "Ooh Aah... Just a Little Bit" (Motiv8 Vintage Honey mix) – 6:46
5. "Ooh Aah... Just a Little Bit" (The Next Room's Pukka Dub mix) – 6:08
- UK CD2
1. "Ooh Aah... Just a Little Bit" (Eurovision Song Contest version) – 3:00
2. "Ooh Aah... Just a Little Bit" (Motiv8 Vintage Honey mix) – 6:46
3. "Ooh Aah... Just a Little Bit" (Jon of the Pleased Wimmin Chase the Space mix) – 7:40
4. "Ooh Aah... Just a Little Bit" (The Next Room's Pukka Dub mix) – 5:00
5. "Ooh Aah... Just a Little Bit" (Motiv8 extended vocal mix) – 6:43
6. "Ooh Aah... Just a Little Bit" (Jon of the Pleased Wimmin Face the Bass mix) – 7:40
- UK 12-inch single

A1. "Ooh Aah... Just a Little Bit" (Motiv8 extended vocal mix) – 6:43
A2. "Ooh Aah... Just a Little Bit" (Motiv8 Vintage Honey mix) – 6:46
AA1. "Ooh Aah... Just a Little Bit" (Jon of the Pleased Wimmin Chase the Space mix) – 7:40
AA2. "Ooh Aah... Just a Little Bit" (Jon of the Pleased Wimmin Face the Bass mix) – 7:40

- UK cassette single and European CD single
1. "Ooh Aah... Just a Little Bit" (Motiv8 radio edit) – 3:25
2. "Ooh Aah... Just a Little Bit" (Motiv8 extended vocal mix) – 6:43
- US CD, 7-inch, and cassette single
1. "Ooh Aah... Just a Little Bit" (Motiv8 radio edit) – 3:24
2. "Ooh Aah... Just a Little Bit" (Eurovision Song Contest version) – 3:02
- US maxi-CD single
1. "Ooh Aah... Just a Little Bit" (Motiv8 radio edit) – 3:24
2. "Ooh Aah... Just a Little Bit" (Jon of the Pleased Wimmin Chase the Space mix) – 7:52
3. "Ooh Aah... Just a Little Bit" (The Next Room's Rip 'Em Up mix) – 6:08
4. "Ooh Aah... Just a Little Bit" (Motiv8 Vintage Honey mix) – 6:46
5. "Ooh Aah... Just a Little Bit" (Jon of the Pleased Wimmin Face the Bass mix) – 7:52
6. "Ooh Aah... Just a Little Bit" (The Next Room's Pukka Dub mix) – 6:08
7. "Ooh Aah... Just a Little Bit" (Motiv8 extended vocal mix) – 6:42
- US 12-inch single

A1. "Ooh Aah... Just a Little Bit" (Motiv8 Vintage Honey mix) – 6:42
A2. "Ooh Aah... Just a Little Bit" (The Next Room's Rip 'Em Up mix) – 6:08
A3. "Ooh Aah... Just a Little Bit" (The Next Room's Pukka Dub mix) – 6:08
B1. "Ooh Aah... Just a Little Bit" (Jon of the Pleased Wimmin Chase the Space mix) – 7:52
B2. "Ooh Aah... Just a Little Bit" (Jon of the Pleased Wimmin Face the Bass mix) – 7:52

== Charts ==
=== Weekly charts ===
| Chart (1996–1997) | Peak position |
|---|---|
| Australia (ARIA) | 5 |
| Belgium (Ultratop 50 Flanders) | 6 |
| Canada Dance/Urban (RPM) | 2 |
| Czech Republic (IFPI CR) | 7 |
| Denmark (IFPI) | 5 |
| Estonia (Eesti Top 20) | 6 |
| Europe (Eurochart Hot 100) | 9 |
| Europe (European Dance Radio) | 6 |
| Europe (European Hit Radio) | 18 |
| Finland (Suomen virallinen lista) | 6 |
| Germany (GfK) | 88 |
| Hungary (Mahasz) | 4 |
| Iceland (Íslenski Listinn Topp 40) | 24 |
| Ireland (IRMA) | 6 |
| Israel (Israeli Singles Chart) | 1 |
| Netherlands (Dutch Top 40 Tipparade) | 13 |
| Netherlands (Single Top 100 Tipparade) | 2 |
| New Zealand (Recorded Music NZ) | 28 |
| Norway (VG-lista) | 5 |
| Scottish Singles Sales (Official Charts) | 1 |
| Sweden (Sverigetopplistan) | 6 |
| UK Singles (Official Charts) | 1 |
| UK Airplay (Music Week) | 3 |
| UK Club Chart (Music Week) | 47 |
| UK Pop Tip Club Chart (Music Week) | 1 |
| US Billboard Hot 100 | 12 |
| US Adult Pop Airplay (Billboard) | 25 |
| US Dance Club Songs (Billboard) | 4 |
| US Dance Singles Sales (Billboard) | 11 |
| US Pop Airplay (Billboard) | 5 |
| US Rhythmic Airplay (Billboard) | 13 |

=== Year-end charts ===
| Chart (1996) | Position |
|---|---|
| Australia (ARIA) | 23 |
| Belgium (Ultratop 50 Flanders) | 50 |
| Canada Dance/Urban (RPM) | 29 |
| Europe (Eurochart Hot 100) | 66 |
| Sweden (Topplistan) | 48 |
| UK Singles (OCC) | 6 |
| UK Airplay (Music Week) | 40 |
| UK Pop Tip Club Chart (Music Week) | 2 |

| Chart (1997) | Position |
|---|---|
| US Billboard Hot 100 | 41 |

== Certifications ==
| Region | Certification | Certified units/sales |
|---|---|---|
| Australia (ARIA) | Gold | 35,000^{^} |
| Norway (IFPI Norway) | Gold | |
| United Kingdom (BPI) | Platinum | 600,000^{^} |
^{^} Shipments figures based on certification alone.

== Release history ==
Release history and formats for "Ooh Aah... Just a Little Bit"
| Region | Date | Format(s) | Label(s) | Ref. |
|---|---|---|---|---|
| United Kingdom | 25 March 1996 | 12-inch vinyl; CD1; cassette | Eternal; WEA | |
| United Kingdom | 13 May 1996 | CD2 | Eternal; WEA | |
| United States | 26 November 1996 | Rhythmic contemporary radio | Warner Bros. | |
| Japan | 10 May 1997 | CD | Warner Bros. | |
