= Hanna Panna Wiesner =

Hungarian rhythmic gymnast

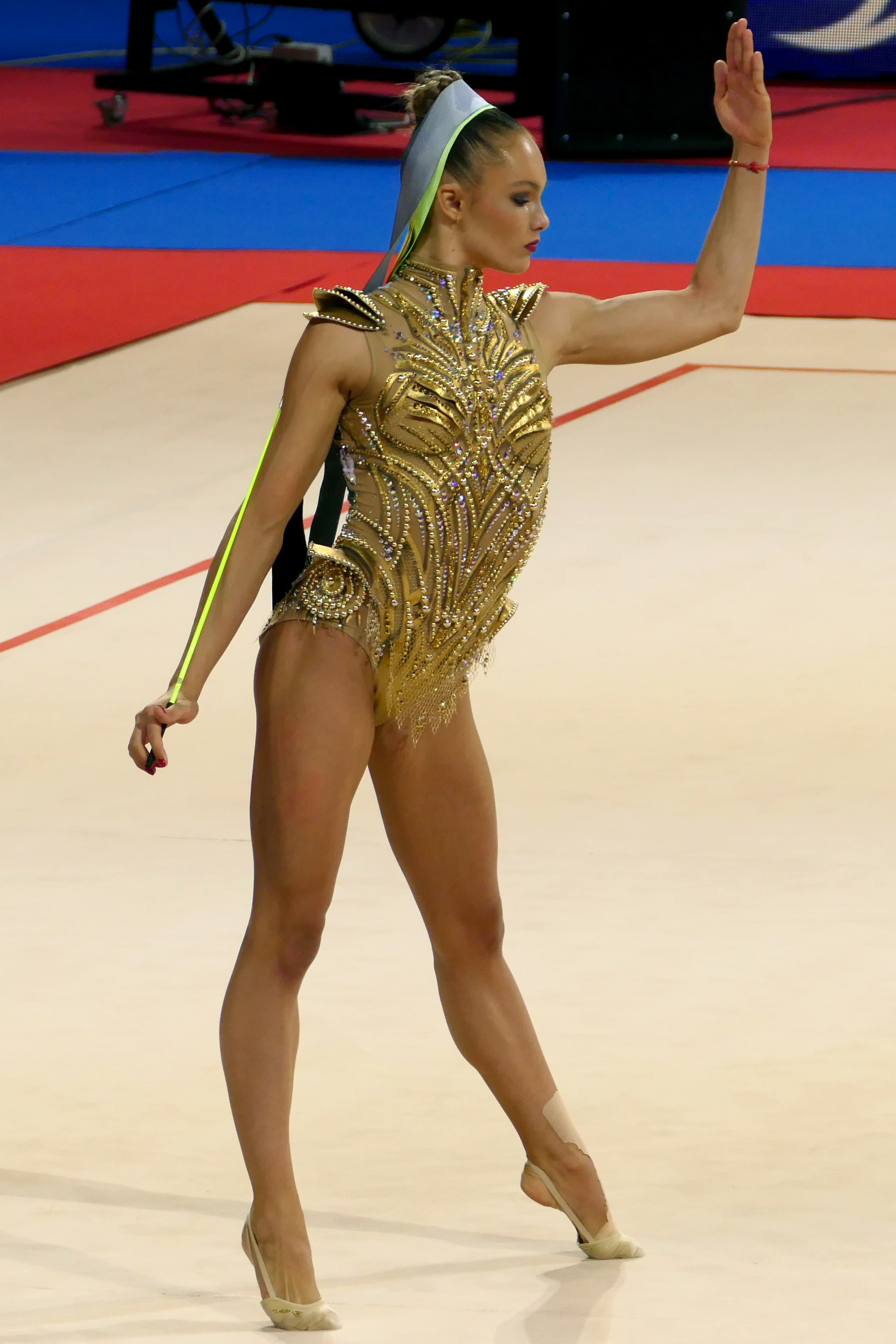
- Wiesner in 2024

Personal information
- Born: December 29, 2004 (age 21) Budapest, Hungary

Gymnastics career
- Discipline: Rhythmic gymnastics
- Country represented: Hungary (2021-)
- Club: MTK Budapest
- Head coach: Noemi Gelle

Hanna Panna Wiesner (born 29 December 2004) is a Hungarian rhythmic gymnast. She represents her country in international competitions.

== Career ==
She started training rhythmic gymnastics at the club Óbuda-Kalász.

=== Junior ===
In 2019, she competed as a junior at the international tournament Miss Valentine in Tartu, Estonia and placed 19th in the all-around. She was 5th in both the ball and ribbon finals.

=== Senior ===
==== 2021 ====
Wiesner debuted as a senior at the World Cup in Sofia, being 37th in the all-around, 39th with hoop, 30th with ball, 47th with clubs and 30th with ribbon. In April, she competed at the World Cup in Tashkent where she was 30th place in the all-around, 37th with hoop, 26th with ball, 32nd with clubs and 28th with ribbon. A month later, at the World Cup in Baku, she was 39th in the all-around, 41st with hoop, 38th with ball, 44th with clubs and 32nd with ribbon. In June, Wiesner participated in the 2021 European Championships in Varna, Bulgaria. She was 32nd in the all-around, 29th with hoop, 27th with ball, 34th with clubs and 33rd with ribbon.

==== 2022 ====
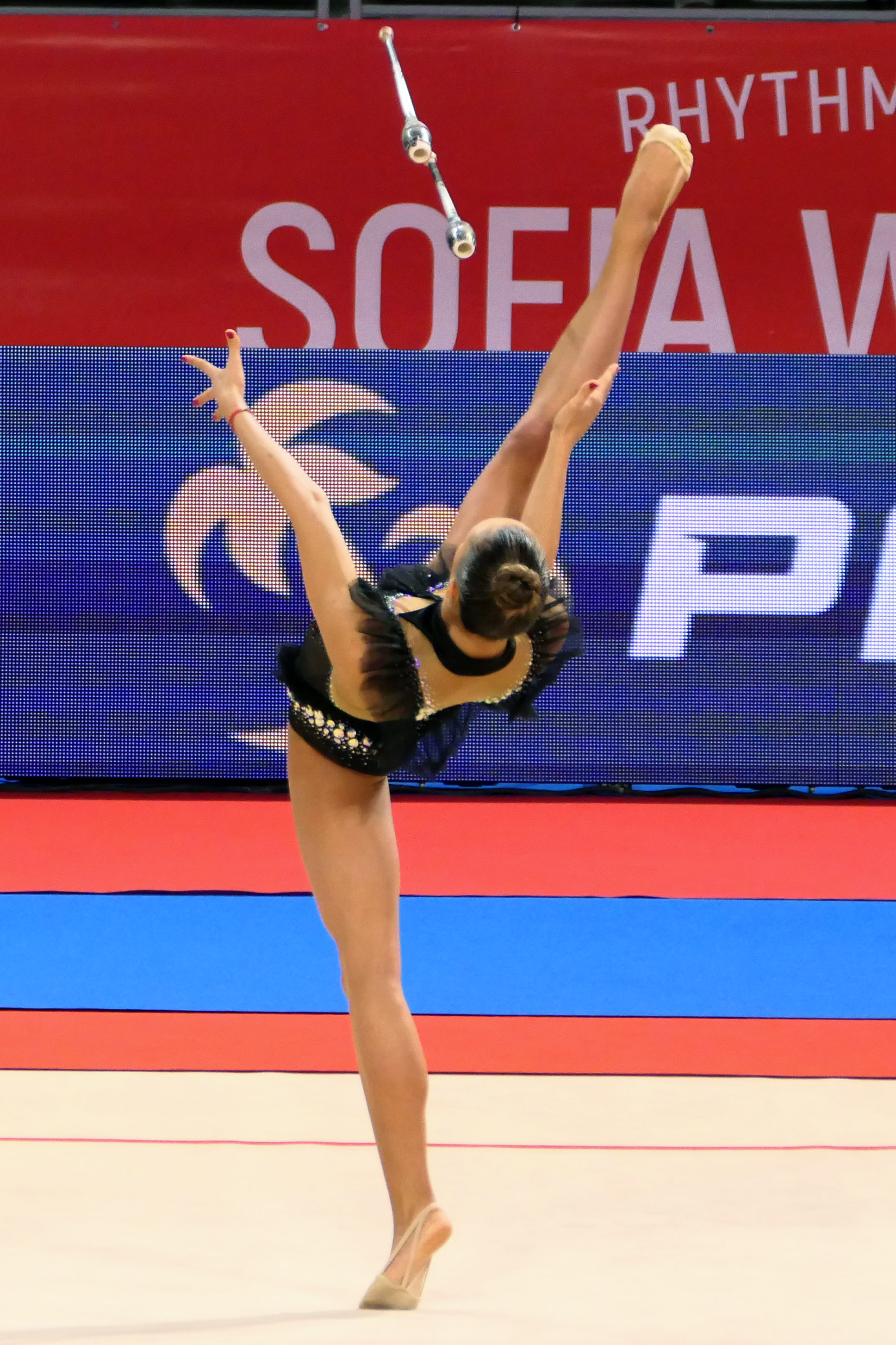
Wiesner competing with clubs at the 2024 Sofia World Cup

Wiesner once again competed in the World Cup in Sofia, finishing 16th in the all-around, 13th with hoop, 6th with ball, 22nd with clubs and 20th with ribbon. She then took part in the World Cup stage in Baku, where she was 22nd in the all-around, 27th with hoop, 20th with ball, 25th with clubs and 19th with ribbon. In May, she competed in the World Challenge Cup in Pamplona, finishing 14th in the all-around, 13th with hoop, 7th with ball, 13th with clubs and 20th with ribbon. She also competed at the World Cup in Portimão, where she was 8th in the all-around, 10th with hoop, 7th with ball, 10th with clubs and 12th with ribbon.

In June, Wiesner was selected for the European Championships in Tel Aviv alongside the senior group and Fanni Pigniczki. With the other Hungarian gymnasts, she was 9th in teams, and individually she took 18th place in the all-around final. In September Wiesner competed at the World Championships in Sofia, ending 27th in the all-around, 27th with hoop, 41st with ball, 17th with clubs and 24th with ribbon.

==== 2023 ====
Wiesner competed at the 2023 Rhythmic Gymnastics European Championships in Baku. She qualified for the all-around final and ended in 19th place. At the 2023 World Championships in Valencia, Spain she finished in 24th place in the all-around qualifications and did not advance to the all-around final.

==== 2024 ====
Wiesner competed at Sofia World Cup in April, where she ended in 23rd place in the all-around. She represented Hungary at the 2024 European Championships in her hometown Budapest. In the all-around qualification, she was 16th after dropping her clubs at the end of the routine; she expressed anger about the mistake. She placed 12th in the all-around final and 6th in the team competition with the other Hungarian gymnasts. Wiesner said she was happy that she had improved her placement over the previous year's European Championships.

==== 2025 ====
In June, Wiesner represented Hungary together with Fanni Pigniczki at the 2025 European Championships in Tallinn, Estonia. She placed 34th in all-around qualifications and did not advance into the all-around final. In July, she competed at the 2025 Summer Universiade in Essen and took 16th place in the all-around. In the hoop final, she finished 8th. In August, she represented Hungary alongside Fanni Pigniczki and Luca Lovász at the 2025 World Championships in Rio de Janeiro, Brazil. She took 49th place in all-around qualifications and did not advance into the all-around final.

== Routine music information ==
Year	Apparatus	Music Title
2026	Hoop	
2026	Ball	
2026	Clubs	Reborn (No Vocal Mix) by Really Slow Motion
2026	Ribbon	
2025	Hoop	
2025	Ball	Eye of the Tiger by Tommee Profitt, FJØRA, Joseph William Morgan
2025	Clubs	Prologue (from Beauty and the Beast) by Alala
2025	Ribbon	Babylon by Lady Gaga
2024	Hoop	Beautiful Lie / The Red Capes Are Coming (Lex Luthor Theme) / Their War Here by Hans Zimmer & Junkie XL by Hans Zimmer, Junkle XL
2024	Ball	Bad Guy by Postmodern Jukebox
2024	Clubs	Wednesday Soundtrack, Paint It Black / Goo Goo Muck by The Cramps
2024	Ribbon	Babylon by Lady Gaga
2023	Hoop	Beautiful Lie / The Red Capes Are Coming (Lex Luthor Theme) / Their War Here by Hans Zimmer & Junkie XL by Hans Zimmer, Junkle XL
2023	Ball (first)	In This Shirt by The Irrepressibles
2023	Ball (second)	Bad Guy by Postmodern Jukebox
2023	Clubs	Wednesday Soundtrack, Paint It Black / Goo Goo Muck by The Cramps
2023	Ribbon	Fireball by Pitbull feat John Ryan / Rise by Safri Duo
2022	Hoop	Mombasa by 2CELLOS
2022	Ball	In This Shirt by The Irrepressibles
2022	Clubs	Thé à la menthe by La Caution
2022	Ribbon	Fireball by Pitbull feat John Ryan / Rise by Safri Duo
2021	Hoop	Brasier by KEMARL1FAM
2021	Ball	Fire Under My Feet by Leona Lewis
2021	Clubs	Thé à la menthe by La Caution
2021	Ribbon	Tora Tora by Etnorchestra
