= Naomi Thompson =

British singer

- Born: Naomi Thompson Osbourne
- Occupation: Singer
- Instrument: Vocals

Naomi Thompson is a British singer.

In the early-to-late 1980s, she worked with Caron Wheeler and Claudia Fontaine under the name Afrodiziak, which recorded for Haysi Fantayzee on their track "The Sabres of Paradise", and sang backup vocals on Erasure's hit "Chains of Love", Elvis Costello's 1983 international hit "Everyday I Write the Book", The Specials' "Free Nelson Mandela", Heaven 17's "Sunset Now", "The Fuse", "Reputation" and "...(And That's No Lie)", on Madness' "Michael Caine" and "The Sweetest Girl" and on Howard Jones' "Things Can Only Get Better" and "Life in One Day".

== Post-Afrodiziak ==
Once Afrodiziak had split up, Thompson worked with artists such as S'Express, singing on their No. 32 hit "Nothing to Lose" and for E-Zee Possee on their No. 62 hit "The Sun Machine".
