= No One Is to Blame =

Single by Howard Jones

from the album Dream into Action (original version) Action Replay and One to One (re-recorded version)
- B-side: "The Chase"
- Released: 7 March 1986 (UK); 24 March 1986 (US)
- Recorded: 1985
- Studio: Farmyard (Little Chalfont, Buckinghamshire)
- Genre: New wave; soft rock
- Length: 3:29 (1985 version); 4:13 (1986 version)
- Label: WEA (UK); Elektra (US)
- Songwriter: Howard Jones
- Producers: Phil Collins; Hugh Padgham

Howard Jones singles chronology
"Life in One Day" (1985)	"No One Is to Blame" (1986)	"All I Want" (1986)

Music video
- "No One Is to Blame" on YouTube

"No One Is to Blame" is a song written and performed by the British synth-pop musician Howard Jones. Originally released on Jones's second studio album Dream into Action (1985), "No One Is to Blame" was re-recorded and released as a single in 1986. The single became Jones's biggest US hit to date, peaking at No. 4.

== History ==
The original version of "No One Is to Blame" can be found on Dream into Action. Following the success of the previous singles from that album, the song was re-recorded to generate a more radio-friendly sound. Phil Collins and Hugh Padgham produced the re-recording, with Collins adding his own drum work and mood. The new version of the song was included on the 1986 US extended play (EP) Action Replay as well as the CD version of Jones's third studio album, One to One (1986).

"No One Is to Blame" was released as a single in March 1986. It became Jones's biggest hit in the United States, peaking at No. 4 on the Billboard Hot 100. The song also became the first of his two No. 1 songs on the US Adult Contemporary chart ("Everlasting Love" would top this chart in 1989). "No One Is to Blame" was also a top 10 hit in Australia and a No. 16 hit on the UK singles chart

== Critical reception ==
In 2018, Morgan Enos of Billboard described "No One Is to Blame" as a "dreamy, existential" ballad that "doesn't quite deal with love, but with the lack thereof". Enos added that the song "had a message and melody that resonated". The song is known for its "aching beauty" and for Jones's "plaintive lead vocals and piano".

== Track listings ==
7-inch

1. "No One Is to Blame" – 4:14
2. "The Chase" – 2:53

12-inch

1. "No One Is to Blame" (extended mix) – 5:16
2. "The Chase" – 2:53
3. "No One Is to Blame (The Long Mix)" – 3:07

== Chart positions ==
=== Weekly charts ===
Chart (1986)	Position
Australia (Kent Music Report)	9
Canada (The Record)	12
Italian Singles Chart	21
UK singles chart	16
US Adult Contemporary (Billboard)	1
US Mainstream Rock Tracks (Billboard)	20
US Billboard Hot 100	4

=== Year-end charts ===
Year-end chart (1986)	Position
Australia (Kent Music Report)	63
US Top Pop Singles (Billboard)	44

== Personnel on 1986 version ==
- Howard Jones – vocals, keyboards, percussion programming
- Phil Collins – drums, backing vocals, co-producer
- Phil Palmer – guitar
- Mo Foster – bass guitar
- Afrodiziak – backing vocals
- Hugh Padgham – co-producer, engineer
- Steve Chase – assistant engineer
- Paul Gomersall – assistant engineer

== Other versions ==
Jones performed the song solo on The Old Grey Whistle Test in 1985. A previously unreleased cover version of "No One Is to Blame" by the American singer-songwriter Neilson Hubbard appears on the Parasol Records compilation album, Parasol's Sweet Sixteen, Volume 4 (2001).

The American singer-songwriter Rachael Sage recorded a version of "No One Is to Blame" in 2018.

== See also ==
- List of number-one Adult Contemporary singles of 1986 (U.S.)
