= Dream into Action =

Studio album by Howard Jones
- Released: 15 March 1985
- Recorded: 1984–1985
- Studios: Farmyard (Little Chalfont, Buckinghamshire)
- Genre: Synth-pop
- Length: 55:45
- Labels: WEA; Elektra
- Producer: Rupert Hine

Howard Jones chronology
The 12″ Album (1984)	Dream into Action (1985)	Action Replay (1986)

Singles from Dream into Action
- 1. "Things Can Only Get Better" Released: 1 February 1985; 2. "Look Mama" Released: 12 April 1985; 3. "Life in One Day" Released: 17 June 1985; 4. "No One Is to Blame" Released: 7 March 1986

Dream into Action is the second studio album by the English synth-pop musician Howard Jones, released in the UK on 15 March 1985. It reached number 2 on the UK Albums Chart and also reached the top ten on the US Billboard 200, peaking at number 10. The album achieved a gold certification in the UK and platinum status in the US and Canada.

The album contains the hit singles "Things Can Only Get Better" (UK No. 6, US No. 5), "Look Mama" (UK No. 10) and "Life in One Day" (UK No. 14, US No. 19). Additionally, the track "No One Is to Blame" was re-recorded in a new arrangement for single release, reaching No. 16 on the UK singles chart and No. 4 on the US Billboard Hot 100 in 1986; this version was included on a later second European pressing of the album. The 1984 single "Like to Get to Know You Well" (UK No. 4) was included on the album's CD reissue (and is also on the US version of the vinyl album). A world tour accompanied the album's original release with Jones playing Wembley Arena and the O2 Academy Birmingham in the UK, and arena-size venues in the US, Europe and Japan. In 2010, a remastered edition of the album was issued alongside Jones' debut studio album Human's Lib (1984).

== Critical reception ==
Professional ratings
Review scores
Source	Rating
AllMusic	4/5 stars
God Is in the TV	9/10
Number One	3/5
Record Collector	3/5 stars
Record Mirror	3/5 stars
The Rolling Stone Album Guide	3/5 stars
Smash Hits	7/10
Sounds	4/5 stars
The Village Voice	D

Contemporary reviews of the album in the UK music press were mixed. In Melody Maker, Caroline Sullivan compared Jones to the robot-like figures on the album cover and said, "The pre-glam, pre-pre-punk technosaurs are remembered contemptuously, for their be-laboured grandiosity, sixth form metaphysical lyrics and unstinting attention to pomposity, all of which HJ faithfully reproduces here." However, Johnny Waller of Sounds stated that "despite so many virtually insurmountable hurdles, Howard Jones is fast maturing into an artist of imagination, style, vision and credibility", viewing Jones's music as displaying great advances and willing to take risks. Paul Sexton of Record Mirror said, "the simple matter of good tunes is causing problems and Jones already seems to be repeating himself", concluding that despite Rupert Hine's production, there was "no spark".

In a retrospective review for AllMusic, Stephen Thomas Erlewine observed that in contrast to the "sleekly electronic" Human's Lib, Dream into Action "is a big, bright album that epitomizes the sound of the mainstream in the mid-'80s, a time when computers worked overtime to disguise themselves as human sounds". He concluded that it "is, in many ways, the apotheosis of Howard Jones' career: he'd yet to drift into softened adult contemporary, and he still had enthusiasm for his hooks, his machines, and his positivity, the very things that distinguished him from the legions of synth poppers in the mid-'80s." Paul Scott-Bates of Louder Than War found Dream into Action more "chart oriented" than its predecessor, while noting that throughout the album, Jones "expressed his views and concerns ... with compassion" and "upped the pace with as eclectic and wild compositions."

== Track listing ==
All songs are written and composed by Howard Jones.

=== UK version ===
Side one

1. "Things Can Only Get Better" – 4:02
2. "Life in One Day" – 3:39
3. "Dream into Action" – 3:45
4. "No One Is to Blame" – 3:28 (initial issue), 4:13 (later reissues, single version)
5. "Look Mama" – 3:53
6. "Assault and Battery" – 4:51

Side two

7. "Automaton" – 4:04
8. "Is There a Difference?" – 3:33
9. "Elegy" – 4:20
10. "Specialty" – 3:58
11. "Why Look for the Key" – 3:23
12. "Hunger for the Flesh" – 3:59

CD bonus tracks

13. "Bounce Right Back" (B-side of "Like to Get to Know You Well") – 4:33
14. "Like to Get to Know You Well" – 3:58

=== US version ===
Compared to the UK LP version, the US LP dropped "Specialty" and "Why Look for the Key", and added "Like to Get to Know You Well" and "Bounce Right Back".

Side one

1. "Things Can Only Get Better" – 4:02
2. "Life in One Day" – 3:39
3. "No One Is to Blame" – 3:28
4. "Dream Into Action" – 3:45
5. "Like to Get to Know You Well" – 4:01
6. "Assault and Battery" – 4:51

Side two

7. "Look Mama" – 3:53
8. "Bounce Right Back" – 4:34
9. "Elegy" – 4:20
10. "Is There a Difference?" – 3:33
11. "Automaton" – 4:04
12. "Hunger for the Flesh" – 3:59
- In May 2024, Cherry Red Records released new Special Edition versions of both Dream into Action and Jones' debut studio album, Human's Lib (1984) as CD + Blu-ray packages. The releases feature new mixes of the albums by Stephen W Tayler. The Blu-ray contains both 5.1 DTS HD Master Audio and 96/24 LPCM stereo versions by Tayler, plus Dolby Atmos versions of "Things Can Only Get Better" and "Like to Get to Know You Well" mixed by Bob Clearmountain.

== Personnel ==
- Howard Jones – vocals, instruments, programming
- The TKO Horns (Dave Pleurs, Alan Whetton, Jim Patterson, Brian Maurice) – horns (1)
- Helen Liebman – cello (9)
- Afrodiziak (Claudia Fontaine, Caron Wheeler, Naomi Thompson) – backing vocals (1, 2)
- The Effervescents (Tania Matos, Kirstie Fulthorpe, Laura Bishop, Elizabeth Holden) – girls' voices (6)

=== Production ===
- Produced by Rupert Hine for Gestalt
- Recorded and mixed at Farmyard Studios, England by Stephen W Tayler
- Recording assistant – Andrew Scarth

Other credits

- Album sleeve photography – Simon Fowler
- Graphic design – Rob O'Connor for Stylorouge

== Charts ==
=== Weekly charts ===
Chart (1985)	Peak position
Australian Albums (Kent Music Report)	17
Canadian Albums (RPM)	10
Dutch Albums (Album Top 100)	26
German Albums (Offizielle Top 100)	20
New Zealand Albums (RMNZ)	35
Norwegian Albums (VG-lista)	4
Swedish Albums (Sverigetopplistan)	1
Swiss Albums (Schweizer Hitparade)	19
UK Albums (Official Charts)	2
US Billboard 200	10

=== Year-end charts ===
Chart (1985)	Position
Canadian Albums (RPM)	33
UK Albums (Gallup)	39
US Billboard 200	39

== Certifications ==
Region	Certification	Certified units/sales
Canada (Music Canada)	Platinum	100,000^{^}
United Kingdom (BPI)	Gold	100,000^{^}
United States (RIAA)	Platinum	1,000,000^{^}
^{^} Shipments figures based on certification alone.
