= Pearl in the Shell =

Single by Howard Jones

from the album Human's Lib
- Released: 18 May 1984
- Recorded: 1983
- Studio: Farmyard (Little Chalfont, Buckinghamshire)
- Genre: Synth-pop; new wave
- Length: 4:02
- Label: WEA
- Songwriter: Howard Jones
- Producer: Rupert Hine

Howard Jones singles chronology
"Hide and Seek" (1984)	"Pearl in the Shell" (1984)	"Like to Get to Know You Well" (1984)

Music video
- "Pearl in the Shell" on YouTube

"Pearl in the Shell" is a song by the English synth-pop musician Howard Jones, released on 18 May 1984 by WEA Records as the fourth and final single from his debut studio album, Human's Lib (1984). It reached number 7 on the UK singles chart. It features a saxophone solo by Davey Payne of Ian Dury and the Blockheads.

Unlike Jones' previous singles, the twelve-inch single did not feature an extended mix of the main track, though an extended mix later appeared on The 12″ Album (1984). Instead, the track "Total Conditioning" was an extended version of the song "Conditioning" also taken from Human's Lib, featuring additional lyrics lifted from most of the other songs on that album.

== Track listing ==
7"

1. "Pearl in the Shell" (Howard Jones) – 4:02
2. "Law of the Jungle" (Jones) – 3:19

Two limited edition singles were released featuring the same tracks as above. One was the standard 7" in a poster bag sleeve, the other was a shaped picture disc.

12"

1. "Pearl in the Shell" (Jones) – 4:02
2. "Law of the Jungle" (Jones) – 3:19
3. "Total Conditioning" (Jones, Bill Bryant) – 8:04

== Charts ==
Chart (1984)	Peak position
Germany (GfK)	60
Ireland (IRMA)	2
UK Singles (OCC)	7
