= The 12″ Album =

Remix album by Howard Jones
- Released: 26 November 1984
- Studios: Farmyard (Little Chalfont, Buckinghamshire)
- Genres: New wave; synth-pop
- Length: 37:41
- Labels: WEA; Elektra
- Producer: Rupert Hine

Howard Jones chronology
Human's Lib (1984)	The 12″ Album (1984)	Dream into Action (1985)

The 12″ Album is an album of 12-inch mixes by the English synth-pop musician Howard Jones, released on 26 November 1984 by WEA Records. It was released between his first two studio albums, Human's Lib (1984) and Dream into Action (1985). At the time, it was the only album to feature the single "Like to Get to Know You Well", which had been a hit four months earlier.

The album reached No. 15 on the UK Albums Chart and was certified gold by the BPI.

== Critical reception ==
Professional ratings
Review scores
Source	Rating
AllMusic	3/5 stars
Number One	3/5
Record Mirror	2/5 stars
Sounds	4/5 stars

Reviewing The 12″ Album for AllMusic, Evan Cater found that "while some of the extended mixes are extended beyond their welcome ... the record percolates with the creative spirit that marked Jones' work throughout the '80s."

== Track listing ==
1. "Always Asking Questions" – 4:27
2. "New Song" (new version) – 5:23
3. "What Is Love?" (extended mix) – 6:34
4. "Like to Get to Know You Well" (international mix) – 7:35
5. "Pearl in the Shell" (extended mix) – 6:44
6. "Total Conditioning" – 6:58
- Mixed by Stephen W. Tayler.

== Charts ==
Chart (1984–1985)	Peak position
Australian Albums (Kent Music Report)	56
German Albums (Offizielle Top 100)	49
Swedish Albums (Sverigetopplistan)	20
UK Albums (Official Charts)	15

== Certifications ==
Region	Certification	Certified units/sales
United Kingdom (BPI)	Gold	100,000^{^}
^{^} Shipments figures based on certification alone.
