= Look Mama =

Single by Howard Jones

from the album Dream into Action
- A-side: "Look Mama"
- B-side: "Learning How to Love"
- Released: 12 April 1985
- Studio: Farmyard (Little Chalfont, Buckinghamshire)
- Genre: New wave
- Length: 4:04
- Label: WEA
- Songwriter: Howard Jones
- Producer: Rupert Hine

Howard Jones singles chronology
"Things Can Only Get Better" (1985)	"Look Mama" (1985)	"Life in One Day" (1985)

Music video
- "Look Mama" on YouTube

"Look Mama" is a song from Howard Jones' second studio album Dream into Action (1985). Released on 12 April 1985 by WEA Records as the second single from the album, the song reached No. 10 in the UK singles chart. It was not released as a single in the US, but a different mix to those issued in the UK was included on the US-only remix album Action Replay (1986).

The introduction to the song features some spoken dialogue sampled from the American romantic comedy drama film Alice Doesn't Live Here Anymore (1974).

"Look Mama" is written from the standpoint of a child pleading with his over-protective mother to be allowed greater independence and room to develop his own personality.

== Track listings ==
7"

1. "Look Mama" – 4:03
2. "Learning How to Love" – 5:20

12"

1. "Look Mama" (extended mix) – 9:05
2. "Learning How to Love" – 5:20
3. "Dream into Action" (live at the Manchester Apollo)

12" limited edition

1. "Look Mama (Megamamamix)" – 9:12
2. "Learning How to Love" – 5:20
3. "Dream into Action" (live at the Manchester Apollo)
