= Like to Get to Know You Well =

Single by Howard Jones

from the album The 12″ Album and Dream into Action (CD release)
- B-side: "Bounce Right Back"
- Released: 3 August 1984 (UK); September 1985 (US)
- Recorded: 1984
- Studio: Farmyard (Little Chalfont, Buckinghamshire, England)
- Genre: Synth-pop; new wave
- Length: 3:59
- Label: WEA
- Songwriter: Howard Jones
- Producer: Rupert Hine

Howard Jones singles chronology
| "Pearl in the Shell" (1984) | "Like to Get to Know You Well" (1984) | "Things Can Only Get Better" (1985) |

Music videos
- "Like to Get to Know You Well" on YouTube
- "Like to Get to Know You Well" (US version) on YouTube

"Like to Get to Know You Well" is a song by the English synth-pop musician Howard Jones released as a single in 1984. It reached No. 4 on the UK singles chart, and was subsequently included on his remix album The 12″ Album (1984). It was later included as a bonus track on CD versions of Jones' second studio album, Dream into Action (1985).

The sleeve carried the motto "Dedicated to the original spirit of the Olympic Games" as the single was released at the start of the 1984 Summer Olympics in Los Angeles. The extended version, subtitled "international remix", features Jones singing in English, German and French.

"Like to Get to Know You Well" was featured in the John Cusack film Better Off Dead (1985), as well as the action-adventure game Grand Theft Auto: Vice City Stories (2006) on the in-game radio station Wave 103.

== Music video ==
Two different music videos for the song were made. The first featured Jones walking around the streets of London greeting members of the public, accompanied by his bandmates of the time. Locations featured included the Statue of the Sphinx and Cleopatra's Needle on Victoria Embankment, Trafalgar Square, and the Sun Luck Chinese restaurant on Macclesfield Street, Soho. When the single was released in the US, a new animated video was produced for that market.

== Track listings ==
7"

1. "Like to Get to Know You Well" – 3:59
2. "Bounce Right Back" – 4:34

12"

1. "Like to Get to Know You Well" (international remix) – 7:42
2. "Bounce Right Back" (Cause + Effect mix) – 7:29

== Charts ==
| Chart (1984) | Peak position |
|---|---|
| Germany (GfK) | 56 |
| Ireland (IRMA) | 3 |
| Sweden (Sverigetopplistan) | 8 |
| UK Singles (Official Charts) | 4 |
