= Things Can Only Get Better =

Things Can Only Get Better may refer to:

- "Things Can Only Get Better" (Howard Jones song)
- "Things Can Only Get Better" (D:Ream song)
- "Things Can Only Get Better", song by Kylie Minogue from Rhythm of Love
- Things Can Only Get Better, book by John O'Farrell
