= Action Replay (EP) =

EP by Howard Jones
- Released: 1986
- Studio: Farmyard (Little Chalfont, Buckinghamshire)
- Genre: Synth-pop; new wave
- Label: Elektra
- Producer: Rupert Hine (tracks 2–4, 6); Phil Collins and Hugh Padgham (track 1); Howard Jones (track 5)

Howard Jones chronology
| Dream into Action (1985) | Action Replay (1986) | One to One (1986) |

Professional ratings
Review scores
| Source | Rating |
|---|---|
| AllMusic | 2/5 stars |

Action Replay is a special six-song extended play (EP) by the English synth-pop musician Howard Jones. It was released only in the United States and Canada to support the single version of Jones' hit "No One Is to Blame". Other songs on this release include tracks previously only available in the UK, and a handful of extended remixes. The EP was a substantial hit in North America and on import in Europe.

Action Replay was remastered and released on CD for the first time in 2011.

== Track listing ==
All songs are written and composed by Howard Jones except "Always Asking Questions", music Howard Jones, lyrics William Bryant.

Side A

1. "No One Is to Blame" (US single version) – 4:10
2. "Look Mama" (Extended Mix) – 6:20
3. "Hide and Seek" (Long Version) – 8:35

Side B

1. "Always Asking Questions" – 4:27
2. "Bounce Right Back" (Cause & Effect Mix) – 7:25
3. "Specialty" – 3:52

== Charts ==
| Chart (1986) | Peak position |
|---|---|
| US Billboard 200 | 34 |
