= Pills and Soap =

Single by the Imposter

from the album Punch the Clock
- B-side: "Pills and Soap" (extended version)
- Released: May 1983
- Studio: AIR (London)
- Length: 3:43
- Label: IMP; Demon
- Songwriter(s): Elvis Costello
- Producer(s): Clive Langer; Alan Winstanley

Elvis Costello and the Attractions singles chronology
"Party Party" (1982)	"Pills and Soap" (1983)	"Everyday I Write the Book" (1983)

"Pills and Soap" is a song written by British musician Elvis Costello and recorded by Costello with his backing band the Attractions. It appears on Costello's eighth studio album (seventh with the Attractions) Punch the Clock (1983). In May 1983, prior to the release of the album, it was released as a single credited to "the Imposter" through the impromptu "IMP" label (distributed through Demon Records).

"Pills and Soap" was written in protest of the Margaret Thatcher administration and has been described as a protest song against fascism. Costello has credited hip hop music, particularly Grandmaster Flash and the Furious Five's "The Message" (1982), with inspiring the song. Upon its release, the single became a top 20 hit in the UK, where it peaked at number 16. Costello would again utilize the Imposter pseudonym for the single release of "Peace in Our Time" (1984).

Lyrics from "Pills and Soap" (as well as 1991's "Hurry Down Doomsday (The Bugs Are Taking Over)") reappear in the track "Stick Out Your Tongue" from Costello and the Roots' collaborative album Wise Up Ghost (2013).
