= Punch the Clock =

Studio album by Elvis Costello and the Attractions
- Released: 5 August 1983
- Recorded: January–April 1983
- Studio: AIR (London)
- Genres: New wave; pop rock; R&B; soul
- Length: 45:19
- Labels: F-Beat; Columbia
- Producers: Clive Langer; Alan Winstanley

Elvis Costello and the Attractions chronology
Imperial Bedroom (1982)	Punch the Clock (1983)	Goodbye Cruel World (1984)

Singles from Punch the Clock
- 1. "Everyday I Write the Book" Released: July 1983; 2. "Let Them All Talk" Released: September 1983

Punch the Clock is the eighth studio album by the English singer-songwriter Elvis Costello, and his seventh with the Attractions—keyboardist Steve Nieve, bassist Bruce Thomas and drummer Pete Thomas (no relation). It was released on 5 August 1983 through F-Beat Records in the United Kingdom and Columbia Records in the United States. Produced by Clive Langer and Alan Winstanley, the album was Costello's attempt at making a commercial record following years of dwindling commercial success. It was recorded at London's AIR Studios in early 1983 and features contributions from the TKO Horns and Afrodiziak.

Featuring genres such as new wave, pop rock, R&B and soul, commentators have compared the album's sound to Costello's previous records Armed Forces (1979) and Get Happy!! (1980). The songs are filled with catchy choruses and lyrics covering relationships and political themes. The record contains Costello's version of "Shipbuilding", co-written with Langer and featuring a trumpet solo by Chet Baker. The album takes its title from a lyric in "The Greatest Thing" and the cover artwork was designed by Phil Smee.

Extensively promoted through live performances, Punch the Clock yielded Costello's first US Top 40 hit, "Everyday I Write the Book". "Pills and Soap" was released as a single under a pseudonym and through Costello's own IMP label, which reached number 16 in the UK. The album was his best-selling since Get Happy!!, reaching number three in the UK and number 24 in the US, eventually certified gold in both countries. Despite its success, Costello later expressed disdain for the record, finding its sound dated.

The album received mixed-to-positive reviews from music critics on release and in later decades. Many highlighted individual tracks, particularly "Shipbuilding" and "Pills and Soap", but felt it was below the standards set by his previous works. Nevertheless, NME ranked Punch the Clock the best album of 1983 and, thirty years later, number 345 in their list of "the 500 Greatest Albums of All Time". It has been reissued multiple times with bonus tracks.

== Background ==
Elvis Costello released his seventh studio album Imperial Bedroom in July 1982. Despite receiving critical acclaim, its modest commercial performance forced the artist to reevaluate his musical style. His American label, Columbia Records, remained eager for another success akin to 1979's Armed Forces and showed little interest in his less-commercial works. He had garnered a loyal fanbase—largely through his own merits—but Costello knew his heavily artistic and challenging material was doing him more harm than good, so he decided to change direction with his next record. Having already co-written the song "Shipbuilding" with producer Clive Langer for musician Robert Wyatt, whose original version charted at number 36 in the UK in May 1983, Costello chose Langer and his production partner Alan Winstanley to produce his next album. (Note: Lange had previously opened for Costello during the 1980 Get Happy!! Tour and Costello had produced a portion of Langer's album Splash!) Langer and Winstanley were one of the most popular production teams in Britain at the time, having recently had several hit singles with groups such as Madness, Dexys Midnight Runners and the Teardrop Explodes.

Costello and his backing band the Attractions—keyboardist Steve Nieve, bassist Bruce Thomas and drummer Pete Thomas—toured Britain from mid-September to early-October 1982, road-testing several new songs that would appear on his next album, including his own interpretation of "Shipbuilding" and "Everyday I Write the Book", (Note: Costello said in the album's 1995 liner notes that he recorded his own version of "Shipbuilding" because he wanted the song to be heard by as many people as possible.) which was written quickly one night in September and performed the following evening. He continued writing new material for the rest of the year, debuting working versions of "Mouth Almighty", "Everyday I Write the Book", "The Comedians", "Pills and Soap" and "The World and His Wife" during three Christmas concerts in Liverpool and London in late December. These performances featured new arrangements of songs with a horn section.

== Recording ==
Rehearsals for Costello's eighth studio LP began in early 1983. His goal was to tailor the album toward hit singles and less on critical acclaim, stating at the time: "Counting [1981's] Trust, we'd gone three records without any substantial hit apart from 'Good Year for the Roses'. You have to consider if you allow that contact with the mainstream audience to be served for too long, you may lose the freedom to do what you want to do." The sessions commenced on 27 January 1983 at AIR Studios in London, the same studio used for Imperial Bedroom.

[Langer and Winstanley] favoured the 'building-block' method of recording: retaining very little from the original 'live' take and tailoring each instrumental overdub to best serve the arrangement. This system naturally precluded the spontaneity of our past 'happy accidents' but could yield startling results when the last piece was in place.

— Elvis Costello, 1995

Unlike the more relaxed approach of Imperial Bedroom's producer Geoff Emerick, Langer and Winstanley inserted themselves into the creative process, structuring the songs intently and left little room for improvisation; the former wanted the band to play their parts the same way over and over again. Langer commented: "We don't have any morals when it comes to studio craft. We always mix in sections, then stick it together afterwards." Discussing the duo's process in an interview with Record Collector in 1995, Costello said that "in the past, we'd never conformed to any great production design. [...] This was the first time we'd taken a formal approach, and to some extent it really worked."

With Langer's influence, Costello wrote "more rhythmic songs" than he was used to. Having written the majority of Imperial Bedroom on piano, the producer instructed him to work on guitar to create "more lively material", arguing that he had only become known for "the most cynical and disillusioned songs" that pervaded Imperial Bedroom. This process yielded a pair of "proud and wishful songs" on "Love and Marriage": "The Greatest Thing" and "Let Them All Talk", and a couple about the "Ugly Truth": "Mouth Almighty" and "Charm School". Langer felt the singer could write "incredible pop music", later reflecting: "I think he accepted that that's what we did as producer: [have] hits. He always reacts against what he's done before, so we went for it. We tried to get singles."

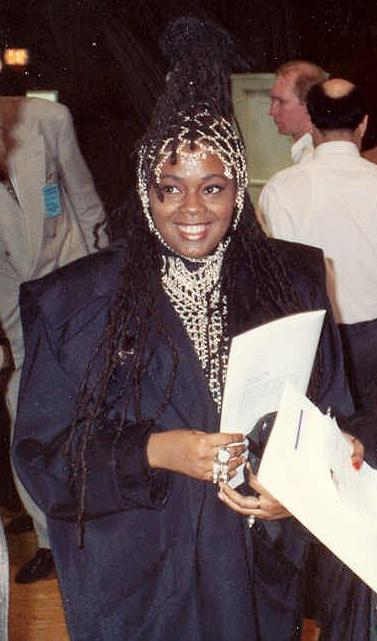
Caron Wheeler, one of the album's backing vocalists, in 1990.

Other than the Attractions, the sessions employed several outside musicians who helped shape the album's sound. The singers Caron Wheeler and Claudia Fontaine, known as Afrodiziak, contributed backing vocals to several songs, improvising all their parts. The same horn section from the Christmas shows, now dubbed the TKO Horns, were also brought in. Consisting of Big Jim Paterson on trombone, Jeff Blythe on alto saxophone and Paul Speare on tenor saxophone, the horns utilised the sound they had fashioned for their work in Dexys Midnight Runners. To not mimic the sound entirely, Costello added the trumpeter Dave Plews to the horns; the latter's prior commitments as a member of Eurythmics' touring band led to his substitution on "The World and His Wife" by Stuart Robson. String arrangements were conducted by David Bedford, Morris Pert contributed percussion, while Chet Baker played a trumpet solo on "Shipbuilding". Although Langer felt the band enjoyed playing with other musicians in the studio, not all of them were convinced. Bruce Thomas later stated: "Those trendy production values. Everything gated together, very bright and shiny. It wasn't our thing, but it worked on a couple of tracks." (Note: Thomas felt "Shipbuilding" was "one of the best things we ever did" and "one of the musical high points".)

In later decades, Langer asserted that the production was a mutually creative process: "At certain times I would have control, other times I'd just let him do it, but if he really didn't like something it wouldn't go on, it was as simple as that." Nevertheless, Costello felt that he lost control of the studio and was difficult on the Attractions as a result, saying, "it's the only time I've given myself over to the production sound, rather than working in collaboration with the producer." The artist wanted the outtakes "Heathen Town" and "Flirting Kind" on the finished album, but kept "Love Went Mad" at Langer's insistence; he stated in the album's 1995 reissue liner notes that he devised a scheme to replace "Love Went Mad" with "Heathen Town" after the initial vinyl pressing. The album was mixed outside of London at Genetic Studios in Streatley, Berkshire.

== Music and lyrics ==
Punch the Clock was our chance to get reacquainted with the wonderful world of pop music and still maintain a sense of humour.

— Elvis Costello, 1995

A more rock-oriented effort than Imperial Bedroom, the author Graeme Thomson described Punch the Clock as an attempt "to be a slicker, more calculated take on the pop-soul sound". Characterised by critics as new wave, pop rock, soul, and R&B, the author Mick St. Michael opined that the LP showed the widest variety of musical styles since Trust. Critics drew comparisons to both Armed Forces and 1980's Get Happy!! In NME, Graham Lock identified musical references from more widely-known acts such as the Beatles to more obscure acts such as Lewis Furey. In The New York Times, Stephen Holden wrote that Punch embraces genres from 1960s soul, late Beatles psychedelia and cool jazz, "compacting and juxtaposing these allusions with a dazzling sleight of hand". AllMusic's Stephen Thomas Erlewine found Langer and Winstanley's production gives the album a "slick, glossy surface".

According to the author James E. Perone, the songs are filled with catchy choruses and "easy, safe wordplay". He also believed the lack of uniquely British references made Punch the Clock more accessible to American audiences compared to Costello's prior works. Lock wrote that the lyrics contain bouts of black humour are and presented with "calmness and compassion" that makes them more "chilling"; the biographer Brian Hinton felt they amounted to "a terrifying world picture". He wrote:

Far more frightening than the fantasies of Armed Forces, this is an everyday place where love grows stale, work palls and time is rapidly ebbing away. In a reversal of Get Happy!! the words are claustrophobic and the music enhancing, even if notably lacking in tunes.

The biographer David Gouldstone found Punch the Clock to be Costello's "most sustained and powerful political statement since Armed Forces", saying that political tracks such as "Shipbuilding", "The Invisible Man", "King of Thieves" and "Pills and Soap", and others such as "Charm School" all offer a brief glimpse at "the workings of the world at large". Hinton also felt that some songs present commentaries on Thatcherism and Reaganomics, wherein humanity is "reduced to an economic transaction".

=== Side one ===
The album's opener, "Let Them All Talk", evokes 1960s Motown through the use of brass instrumentation. In the lyrics, which serve as a reminder that time is lost as it passes, the narrator has lost his girlfriend and all hope for the future. The theme that "talk" is "cheap and meaningless" is resonated by the horns. Hinton argues that the "fa-fa-fa" section's echo of Talking Heads' "Psycho Killer" (1977) foreshadows the rest of the album's impulse to inflict violence. "Everyday I Write the Book" has a retro feel in its lyrics and R&B musical style. AllMusic's Mark Deming summarised: "Both lyrically and melodically, the song suggested an updated variant on classic '60s soul, with the influence of Smokey Robinson peeking through Costello's extended literary metaphor in yet another look at the complexities of romance." Through heavy wordplay, the song concerns the breakdown of a relationship but the author turns to his pen and paper as a way to envision a better connection; he is already working on a sequel in which he wins her back. With its relaxed vocal, the song's lack of a happy ending is juxtaposed with a reflective and humorous tone. Deming said its theme is that "love doesn't last, but it's not bad for as long as it chooses to stick around".

The album takes its title from a line in "The Greatest Thing". With lyrics describing love as a type of fantasy in a unique language, Costello uses the phrase "punching the clock" for the narrator as an expression of starting his work shift or stopping the passage of time in order to find a new lover who will "take his breath away" following a failed marriage. Nevertheless, the song clears the notion that not all marriages turn out this way, resulting in an endless cycle of "punching the clock". The song's music is uplifting; Perone deems its arrangement resembles Men at Work and remarks that it is closest in style to the new wave pop sound of the day. "The Element Within Her" provides a look at human relationships that idolises the woman. With Beatle-like harmonies, the song's title is, in Hinton's words, "a weird sexual pun on [the narrator's] girlfriend's electric heater: the man is a frigid partner here". Perone opines that Costello's playing of both acoustic and electric guitar shows off his skills as an instrumentalist. In "Love Went Mad", the woman fails to respond to the man, so the home is reduced to a battleground and the man is, in Hinton's words, "reduced in scale to a 'big cheese in the workhouse'". Gouldstone says that the chorus is "from an anguished unrequited love song" while the verses come "from a song of denunciation". St. Michael opines that the song's vocal quote of Armed Forces' "Accidents Will Happen" serves as an acknowledgement of Costello's past and openness for the future with a new musical direction.

Described by Perone as the artist's "most overtly antiviolence, antiwar and anti-Thatcher statement to date", "Shipbuilding" is a heavy critique of the Falklands War. Sung from the perspective of an unemployed shipyard worker at the war's start, Costello's lyrics represent a swarm of conflicting emotions: the building of ships brings revenue to the coastal town, but their use brings devastation and death to the young men constructing them. Perone summarises the song as questioning the "balance between monetary gain that comes from the military-industrial complex—in this case the builders of warships—and the loss of life that results from the complex's products." Hinton argues its message is "as direct as an arrow straight through the heart". Additionally, Gouldstone remarks that the artist's sombre response to a political event represents a stark contrast his angry responses displayed on Armed Forces. Compared to Wyatt's original, Costello's vocal performance is sadder and more accepting. Musically, "Shipbuilding" demonstrates Costello's knowledge of jazz, particularly with Baker's trumpet solo, who Hinton argues "brings out the haunting tones of an instrument which usually brags and blusters". AllMusic's Stewart Mason describes it as one of Costello's finest ballad performances.

=== Side two ===
Breaking the evocative mood of "Shipbuilding" is side two opener "T.K.O. (Boxing Day)", a fast-paced R&B song driven by the TKO Horns, who influenced its title. The lyrics concern the ironic comparison of the double-meaning of "Boxing Day": the British day after Christmas and a prize fight. While Gouldstone refers to it as "a wife beater's manifesto", Hinton disagrees with this assessment, stating that the non-celebratory song concerns bullying rather than violence, both in the workplace and bedroom, which is reiterated by Costello's "distasteful" vocal performance. The music and lyrics of "Charm School" frequently refer to post-World War II popular culture and history. Described by Perone as one of the album's "most evocative" pieces, Nieve's keyboard quotes "Theme from Summer of '42". The upbeat music clashes with nasty lyrics. Similar to Trust's "Clubland", the setting is in a nightclub, depicting the breakdown of a marriage. According to Gouldstone, its main theme is "the difficulty of living a happy life", expressed through the description of a disappointing relationship.

"The Invisible Man" refers to H. G. Wells' 1897 novel of the same name and its 1933 film adaptation. Assembled from three earlier tracks, the song deals with, in Gouldstone's words, the "dehumanisation of modern life". In the song, the main character escapes the reality of daily life by watching films; he is the "invisible man" as he feels outcast by people around him, leading him to imagine a nightmarish totalitarian world. "Mouth Almighty" is about a man who cannot control his tongue, which drives his lover away. Gouldstone compares it to some of Imperial Bedroom's songs, such as "Human Hands". Costello described "King of Thieves" as "a tricky tune about the trials of a blacklisted songwriter". Filled with vague lyrics and a sense of paranoia, Gouldstone argues that the song belongs with Costello's other tracks that denounce the treatment of big business on everyday people, from "Welcome to the Working Week" (1977), "Senior Service" (1979) and "Opportunity" (1980). "King of Thieves" is sinister like "The Invisible Man", and similar to 1978's "Night Rally", represents a warning, "foreseeing a world ruled by bureaucracies and unelected despots". St. Michael compares its complex arrangement to the ones on Imperial Bedroom.

"Pills and Soap" provides social commentary on the "abuse of animals as pets and exhibits in factory farming and scientific research". Inspired by The Animals Film (1981), which had turned Costello vegetarian, Costello saw Britain heading in this direction during the era of Thatcherism. Gouldstone comments that it "paints a horrifying picture of the cutthroat free-market economy the Conservatives are trying to create". The music reinforces the lyrical themes; the author describes its "unrelenting" drumbeat sounding like "a march to the death camps", and crashing piano chords that "fall like doom". According to Costello, the beat was inspired by Grandmaster Flash's 1982 hip hop song "The Message". "The World and His Wife" focuses on family life and marks a return to an R&B style. Costello stated that it was "re-written from a solemn folk song about a drunken family gathering into a bilious knees-up". Providing a musical uplift as the LP's closer, Hinton argues that the lyrics culminate the album's themes of "boredom, family breakdown, drunken sex and a taste for violence".

== Packaging ==
The album's cover artwork is more conventional than Costello's previous records; Gouldstone felt it was an attempt to convince listeners that the music inside "won't be too outlandish". Designed by Phil Smee, the photograph of Costello was taken by Nick Knight in Dublin shortly before a warm-up show in June 1983. The artist appears in a "pin-up picture", scratching his left ear as he dons a black cap, a dark collared-up coat and steel-frame glasses. Comparing his appearance to John Lennon, Hinton describes Costello's near-smile look as "quizzical". Sounds magazine's Edwin Pouncey found his appearance similar to a Beat Poet, and likened the Letraset border to the publications The Face and NME. Hot Press passingly described the cover as "dressed in the glamour of commerce with ugly Elvis gazing out all soft-focus and cute".

Costello and the Attractions are present on the back sleeve looking off into the distance with their hands in their pockets. The sleeve was packaged with lyric sheet, albeit with juddered typeface; "The Invisible Man"'s title has the words 'invisible' and (to a greater degree) 'man' faded. Images of the album's musicians appear sideways on the sheet: Afrodiziak are wearing turbans, the TKO Horns are dressed in suit and ties, while Baker, with his eyes closed, Hinton believes "has the pallor of a corpse". The album's original intended artwork, designed by Barney Bubbles, Hinton believes was "far less user-friendly". Examining the rejected piece in his 1999 biography of Costello, he writes:

Elvis's face emerges in cartoon form from a cartoon which draws heavily on Russian constructivism; a metal hand offers him a screwdriver. In an even more disturbing montage, a photo of Elvis and his band has been corrupted so that the Attractions' heads are replaced with symbols; a pill capsule for Nieve, a question mark for Pete, a circle of black cogs for Bruce. What could he have meant?

== Release and promotion ==
The album's release was briefly delayed while F-Beat Records changed worldwide distribution from Warner Bros. to RCA Records. In May 1983, Costello issued "Pills and Soap" as a single on his newly created IMP label, (Note: According to St. Michael, the song was remixed for its appearance on Punch the Clock.) an imprint of his F-Beat subsidiary Demon Records, under the pseudonym "The Imposter", after a song on Get Happy!! It was limited to 15,000 copies and was packaged in a plain sleeve and backed by an "extended version" of the A-side; Costello delivered copies to music editors himself. Discussing its rush-release, Costello stated that he "wanted it out quickly" and did not want to "wait the month or two that it would take to finalise legal matters". The single reached number 16 in the UK, becoming the artist's highest-charting single in two years. It was supposedly deleted on the eve of the 1983 General Election, although Thomson and St. Michael state this is inaccurate. (Note: Attributed to multiple references:)

From May to July 1983, Costello underwent extensive promotion for the album, conducting over 100 interviews and made regular television and radio appearances. In June, he and the Attractions performed a small series of gigs in the UK with the TKO Horns, debuting several Punch the Clock songs live. From July to August, he toured America with the TKO Horns. The setlists primarily relied on material from Get Happy!!, Imperial Bedroom and Punch the Clock, although the shows suffered from Costello's hoarse voice. During this time he recorded a cover of "Walking on Thin Ice"—Yoko Ono's tribute to her late-husband John Lennon—for a tribute album in New Orleans. This was followed by a tour of the UK from late-September to late-November, which saw the addition of Afrodiziak.

"Everyday I Write the Book" was released as the album's first single, backed by "Heathen Town", in July 1983. It was Costello's biggest US single yet, charting at number 32; it also reached number 28 in the UK. Its accompanying music video features lookalikes of Prince Charles and Princess Diana getting on each other's nerves. Punch the Clock was issued the following month on 5 August. Reaching number three on the UK Albums Chart and number 24 on the US Billboard Top LPs & Tape chart, it was the artist's best-selling album since Get Happy!! and eventually certified gold on both sides of Atlantic. Elsewhere, Punch the Clock charted in New Zealand (6), Sweden (9), Norway (18), Australia (22) and the Netherlands (27). "Let Them All Talk", backed by "The Flirting Kind", was issued as the second single in September 1983. It reached number 59 in the UK.

== Critical reception ==
Professional ratings
Initial reviews
Review scores
Source	Rating
Record Mirror	5/5 stars
Rolling Stone	4/5 stars
Smash Hits	8/10
Sounds	4/5 stars
The Village Voice	B+

Punch the Clock received mixed-to-positive reviews from music critics. Several compared it to its predecessor both positively and negatively. Creem's Laura Fissinger felt the new album did not "advance Costello's grand artistic plans" like Imperial Bedroom. In NME, Lock wrote that if it is "a step back from the stunning sophistication of Imperial Bedroom," Punch the Clock is "perhaps a step toward pop survival". More positively, Sweeting stated in Melody Maker: "Where Imperial Bedroom often wallowed low in the water under its top-heavy superstructure of grandiose arrangements and encyclopedic lyrics, Punch the Clock draws up a short-list of priorities and nails them with ruthless efficiency."

Amongst positive reviews, Pouncey described Punch the Clock as an "enjoyable listening experience" in Sounds, praising the performances of Costello, the Attractions and TKO Horns. He concluded: "If you were to judge this particular 'book' by its cover then you'd probably drop it like a hot potato, but once inside you'll be amply rewarded." Jock Baird of Musician magazine similarly said: "For many, critics and otherwise, the pearls of Punch the Clock will have to be dived for, but their value will be all the more increased for it." In a five-star review for Record Mirror, Mike Gardner declared Punch the Clock "a vital collection that holds its head up high even amongst Elvis' vast legacy". Boo Browning of The Washington Post considered it his "most honest and well-integrated work to date", one that contains his "best arrangements, melodies and singing" since My Aim Is True (1977). Several felt Costello remained one of the best songwriters of the era.

Some agreed that while the album is not perfect, it still contained several "knockouts". David Hepworth of Smash Hits felt there was "enough power and detail" in tracks such as "King of Thieves" and "The World and His Wife" to warrant repeated listens, while Jon Young deemed Punch the Clock "a smart album that protests its own cleverness too much" in Trouser Press. Rolling Stone's Christopher Connelly declared it "a satisfying, if unstartling, opus", one that contains what fans expect of him: "terrific tunes, take-it-or-leave-it singing and jaw-breaking wordplay that baffles as much as it enlightens." Amongst individual tracks, numerous highlighted "Shipbuilding" and "Pills and Soap" as the album's standouts; some even felt the former was Costello's finest composition to date.

Billboard magazine found the songs more accessible and believed Costello was striving for a broader audience. Other critics commented on Costello's change in musical direction; Holden described the material as his "frothiest, most accessible pop music" to date in The New York Times. Langer and Winstanley's production received both positive and negative comments. (Note: Attributed to multiple references:) According to Hinton, several saw the production as "over-slick" compared to Emerick's on Imperial Bedroom.

Other reviewers were more negative towards Punch the Clock. In Creem, Fissinger felt it was a "(fairly) simple case of reach exceeding grasp". Writing for The Village Voice, Robert Christgau criticised the album for a lack of innovation coming off its predecessor, equating to a "disparate collection" that is a "major letdown". Richard Cromelin was also negative in the Los Angeles Times, disparaging the musical retread of past works and the lack of force and spirit in the songs that drove his previous works. He further condemned the singing as lacking "customary driven edge" and the production as "provides a flat sound", concluding: "The man who brilliantly dissected life in terms of "Armed Forces" appears to have declared neutrality. It doesn't suit him, and the sooner he rejoins the fray the better."

At the end of the year, NME named Punch the Clock the best album of 1983. In The Village Voice's annual Pazz & Jop critics' poll for the year's best albums, Punch the Clock finished at number 11.

== Legacy ==
[Clive and Alan] were real pop producers, so obviously the records date to the time they were made in. With all due respect, that sound hasn't dated all that well.

— Elvis Costello

Costello was initially disappointed with Punch the Clock. He bemoaned its "lack of heart", "misplaced arrangements" and felt it disregarded longevity: "A lot of the planning, the imaginary production of the record relates to pop music of the moment." Later on, he lambasted the "passionless fads of that charmless time: the early '80s."

In December 1983, Costello began writing songs for a follow-up album, attempting to put "more craft and focus" into the tunes which he believed Punch the Clock lacked. The record's commercial success, however, enabled Costello to invite Langer and Winstanley back to produce, although relations between the songwriter and the Attractions were at a low point due to feeling sidelined by the TKO Horns and backing singers during the US and UK tours. The resulting album, Goodbye Cruel World, Costello hated and is regarded by biographers as the artist's low point.

=== Retrospective appraisal ===
Professional ratings
Retrospective reviews
Review scores
Source	Rating
AllMusic	3/5 stars
Blender	3/5 stars
Chicago Tribune	3/4 stars
Classic Rock	3/5 stars
The Encyclopedia of Popular Music	3/5 stars
Entertainment Weekly	A
Mojo	3/5 stars
The Rolling Stone Album Guide	3/5 stars
Uncut	3/5 stars

Punch the Clock has received mixed reviews in later decades. Writing in 1991, Greg Kot of the Chicago Tribune considered the album "a partially successful stab at mainstream success", while Entertainment Weekly's Armond White simply wrote: "Work was never more fun, never better sung." Writing for Blender magazine in 2005, Douglas Wolk deemed the record a "not-entirely successful attempt to score pop hits", but saw "a whimsy and effervescence" that rarely appears in the artist's other works.

In a retrospective write-up, Trouser Press called the album "another tour de force", while Lee Zimmerman of Goldmine wrote that it includes some of Costello's best songs of the era and some of his most successful. More unfavourably, Erlewine deemed Punch the Clock the artist's "least consistent set of original songs" up to that point, finding most of the material falls short of his standards. Erlewine enjoyed the production but found the uneven songwriting means "only portions" of the album as a whole are memorable. On the other hand, Uncut's Jon Wilde felt the LP was weighed down by the "over-sheened production", the horns and backing vocalists. Nevertheless, commentators particularly highlight "Pills and Soap" and "Shipbuilding" as the record's standouts; (Note: Attributed to multiple references:) Erlewine says they are "articulate and effective as any of his past work". Perone argues that the two tracks anticipated the more political-charged commentary that continued to infuse Costello's work in subsequent decades.

Costello's biographers have given mixed reactions to Punch the Clock. Writing positively, Clayton-Lea says that while it lacked "the sultry, sleazy sophistication" of Imperial Bedroom, its music stood out as "bright" as Armed Forces. He ultimately declares it "another stylistic triumph from a pop star who wasn't all that popular". Hinton, who titled his 1999 biography of Costello after "Let Them All Talk", is more negative, calling the album's sound dated in the CD age, finding that "the album sounds unpleasantly squashed, and never quite loud enough, no matter what volume you play it at." Thomson recognises the record's unified sound, but believes it was "thin contrived". He also disliked the sidelining of the Attractions and felt Afrodiziak and the TKO Horns displayed "very little subtlety" in the final mix. Thomson and Gouldstone agree that too many songs lack the "craft" and "intensity", respectively, of Costello's previous works and were ultimately not up to the artist's standards.

Gouldstone and Perone criticise some of the lyrics as "too abstract and uninvolving" and "surface level", respectively. Although the former disregards all of the melodies aside from "Shipbuilding" (which was written by Langer), the latter found it more memorable overall than Goodbye Cruel World. When not compared to other works, however, Gouldstone recognizes Punch the Clock as "a varied, provocative and punchy collection of well-above-average songs". Perone, who deems the album "accessible, but not particularly deep", observes that the album's lyrical themes of narrators acknowledging their shortcomings and accepting responsibility for their actions were expanded upon in Goodbye Cruel World.

In lists ranking Costello's albums from worst to best, Punch the Clock has placed modestly. In 2021, writers for Stereogum placed it at number nine (out of 27), saying that the artist's material ranges from "mostly good to excellent", but found the "overwhelming sonics" run their course throughout the album's runtime. A year later in 2022, Michael Gallucci placed it at number 10 (out of 29) in Ultimate Classic Rock, while Spin's Al Shipley placed it at number 23 (out of 31). Both gave high praise to "Shipbuilding" but found the production becomes overbearing at times. In 2013, NME ranked Punch the Clock at number 345 in its list of "the 500 Greatest Albums of All Time".

== Reissues ==
Punch the Clock was first released on CD through Columbia and Demon in January 1988. Its first extended reissue through Demon in the UK and Rykodisc in the US on CD came on 24 February 1995, which included a slew of bonus tracks and Bubbles' original artwork.

Punch the Clock was again reissued by Rhino Records on 9 September 2003 as a two-disc set with additional bonus tracks, totalling 40. The 2003 reissue was positively received. Zimmerman praised the bonus tracks as "perfectly complement[ing]" the originals, even finding Costello's ten solo demos highlighted the strength of the songs themselves. Wilde felt the bonus disc "redeemed" the record. It was later remastered and reissued by UM^{e} on 6 November 2015.

== Track listing ==
All tracks are written by Elvis Costello, except where noted

Side one
No.	Title	Writer(s)	Length
1.	"Let Them All Talk"		3:06
2.	"Everyday I Write the Book"		3:53
3.	"The Greatest Thing"		3:04
4.	"The Element Within Her"		2:52
5.	"Love Went Mad"		3:13
6.	"Shipbuilding"	Clive Langer, Costello	4:51

Side two
No.	Title	Length
7.	"T.K.O. (Boxing Day)"	3:28
8.	"Charm School"	3:55
9.	"The Invisible Man"	3:04
10.	"Mouth Almighty"	3:04
11.	"King of Thieves"	3:45
12.	"Pills and Soap"	3:43
13.	"The World and His Wife"	3:32
Total length:		45:19

1995 Rykodisc Extended Play
No.	Title	Writer(s)	Length
14.	"Heathen Town"		3:10
15.	"The Flirting Kind"		3:00
16.	"Walking on Thin Ice" (Producer – Allen Toussaint)	Yoko Ono	3:52
17.	"The Town Where Time Stood Still"		3:32
18.	"Shatterproof" (Demo)		2:19
19.	"The World and his Wife" (Live)		3:13
20.	"Everyday I Write the Book" (Live)		2:21
Total length:			66:46

2003 Rhino Bonus Disc
No.	Title	Writer(s)	Length
1.	"Everyday I Write the Book" (Alternate version)		2:22
2.	"Baby Pictures"		1:30
3.	"Heathen Town"		3:10
4.	"The Flirting Kind"		3:00
5.	"Walking on Thin Ice"	Ono	3:52
6.	"Big Sister's Clothes/Stand Down Margaret" (BBC Session)	Costello, Roger Chalery, Andy Cox, Everett Morton, David Steele, Dave Wakeling	5:17
7.	"Danger Zone" (BBC Session)	Percy Mayfield	2:18
8.	"Seconds of Pleasure"		3:44
9.	"The Town Where Time Stood Still"		3:33
10.	"The World and His Wife" (Solo version)		2:44
11.	"Shatterproof" (Recorded at home)		2:15
12.	"Heathen Town" (Demo)		2:17
13.	"The Flirting Kind" (Demo)		2:52
14.	"Let Them All Talk" (Demo)		2:14
15.	"King of Thieves" (Demo)		3:20
16.	"The Invisible Man" (Demo)		2:12
17.	"The Element Within Her" (Demo)		2:13
18.	"Love Went Mad" (Demo)		3:01
19.	"The Greatest Thing" (Demo)		2:25
20.	"Mouth Almighty" (Demo)		3:03
21.	"Charm School" (Demo)		2:17
22.	"Possession" (Live at the University of Texas at Austin, 7 September 1983)		2:29
23.	"Secondary Modern" (Live at UT)		3:02
24.	"The Bells" (Live at UT)	Johnny Bristol, Marvin Gaye, Anna Gordy, Elgie Stover	4:14
25.	"Watch Your Step" (Live at UT)		3:22
26.	"Back Stabbers/King Horse" (Live at UT)	Leon Huff, Gene McFadden, John Whitehead, Costello	4:47

Note: The Rykodisc version has the original tracks and bonus tracks on one CD. The Rhino version has two CDs with the original tracks on the first CD.

== Personnel ==
According to 1995 reissue liner notes:

- Elvis Costello – vocals; Epiphone, Gretsch and Fender guitars; Synclavier and Casiotone; drum machine on "Pills and Soap"
- Steve Nieve – Bösendorfer piano, Emulator, Fairlight CMI, Vox organ, Hammond organ, Synclavier
- Bruce Thomas – electric Wal bass guitar
- Pete Thomas – Gretsch drums, Sabian cymbals

The TKO Horns

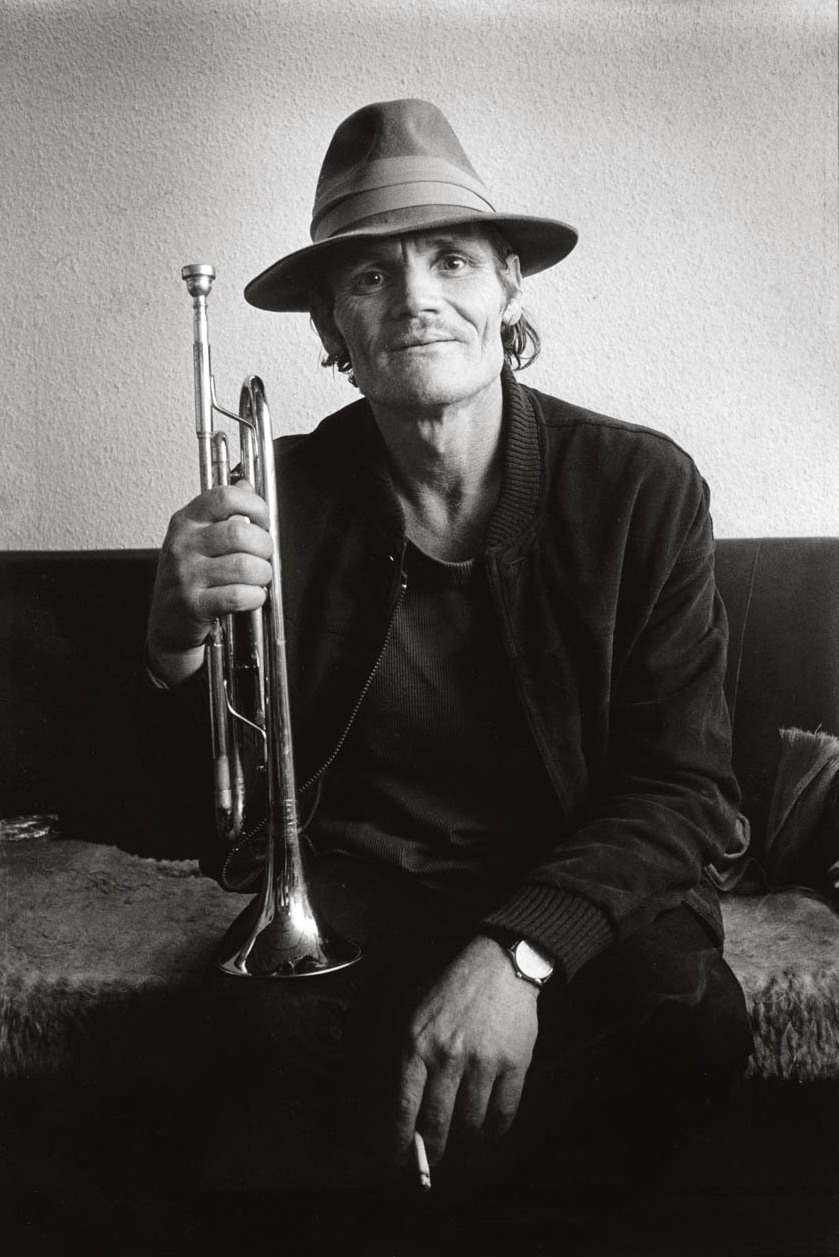
"Shipbuilding" features a trumpet solo by Chet Baker (pictured in 1983).

- Jim Paterson – trombone
- Jeff Blythe – alto saxophone, baritone saxophone, clarinet
- Paul Speare – tenor saxophone, flute
- Dave Plews – trumpet

Additional personnel

- Stewart Robson – trumpet and flugelhorn on "The World and His Wife"
- Afrodiziak (Caron Wheeler and Claudia Fontaine) – backing vocals
- Chet Baker – trumpet solo on "Shipbuilding"
- David Bedford – string arrangements
- Morris Pert – percussion

Technical

- Clive Langer – producer
- Alan Winstanley – producer
- Gavin Greenaway – assistant producer
- Colin Fairley – assistant producer
- Phil Smee – sleeve
- Nick Knight – photography

== Charts ==
Weekly chart performance for Punch the Clock
Chart (1983)	Peak Position
Australian Albums (Kent Music Report)	22
Dutch Albums (MegaCharts)	27
New Zealand Albums (RIANZ)	6
Norwegian Albums (VG-lista)	18
Swedish Albums (Sverigetopplistan)	9
UK Albums Chart	3
US Billboard Top LPs & Tape	24
