= The Ballad of Go Go Brown =

Single by Heaven 17

from the album Teddy Bear, Duke & Psycho
- B-side: "I Set You Free"
- Released: 15 August 1988
- Genre: Country; pop
- Length: 3:43
- Label: Virgin
- Songwriters: Glenn Gregory; Ian Craig Marsh; Martyn Ware
- Producer: Heaven 17

Heaven 17 singles chronology
"Trouble" (1987)	"The Ballad of Go Go Brown" (1988)	"Train of Love in Motion" (1988)

"The Ballad of Go Go Brown" is a song by the English new wave and synth-pop band Heaven 17, released on 15 August 1988 as the lead single from their fifth studio album, Teddy Bear, Duke & Psycho. The song was written and produced by band members Glenn Gregory, Ian Craig Marsh and Martyn Ware. "The Ballad of Go Go Brown" reached number 91 in the UK singles chart and remained in the top 100 for two weeks.

== Background ==
As a significant shift away from the band's usual electronic sound, "The Ballad of Go Go Brown" has a country-influenced sound and features a prominent use of guitars. Martyn Ware told Music Week in 1988, "We viewed it as [having] a Elvis Presley sort of vibe. [It was released as a single] because it was so unusual. The world doesn't need another re-launch of a group that sounds exactly the same. We thought, at least, it will provoke some reaction out of people."

== Critical reception ==
Upon its release, Adam Blake of Music Week wrote, "Certainly blues harp and rock 'n' roll bass lines are hardly what one associates with Heaven 17, but with its hard-edged lyric about a teenaged drug-pusher and its admirably uncluttered arrangement, 'Go Go Brown' deserves attention." Mica Paris, as guest reviewer for Number One said, "I think this is quite nice. Very country and western. I liked their older stuff a lot, but they've really moved away from that. This is OK but I couldn't handle too much of it." Andrew Hirst of the Huddersfield Daily Examiner considered it to be a "rocky country ballad complete with quivering guitar twangs and doleful harmonica". He felt the single would either "sink out of sight or shoot spectacularly up to the top slot".

William Shaw of Smash Hits criticised the band for dropping their original sound and "trying to pretend to be some ancient old 'rhythm and blues' group". He said of the song, "This is a shockingly awful song. It's annoyingly nonsensical and it chugs along at such a relentlessly dismal pace." In a retrospective review of Teddy Bear, Duke & Psycho, Aaron Badgley of AllMusic commented, "Worth the price of the album is the out of character country-tinged 'The Ballad of Go Go Brown.' Heaven 17 had never sounded like this before, and it demonstrated their versatility."

== Formats ==
7-inch single

1. "The Ballad of Go Go Brown" - 3:43
2. "I Set You Free" - 5:08

12-inch single

1. "The Ballad of Go Go Brown" (Extended Version) - 4:37
2. "The Ballad of Go Go Brown" (7" Version) - 3:43
3. "The Ballad Of Go Go Brown" (Version) - 4:29
4. "I Set You Free" - 5:08

CD single

1. "The Ballad of Go Go Brown" (Extended Version) - 4:37
2. "I Set You Free" - 5:09
3. "The Ballad of Go Go Brown" (7" Version) - 3:43
4. "Slow All Over" - 6:36

== Personnel ==
Heaven 17

- Glenn Gregory
- Martyn Ware
- Ian Craig Marsh

Additional personnel

- Assorted Images - design and sleeve producer
- Jean Pierre Masclet - photography

== Charts ==
Chart (1988)	Peak position
UK Singles Chart	91
