= Pleasure One =

Studio album by Heaven 17
- Released: 17 November 1986
- Recorded: May 1985 – July 1986
- Studio: H17 HQ Studio, Townhouse 3, Red Bus Studios, Marcus Recording Studios, The Barge, AIR Studios and Roundhouse Studios (London, UK); Studio Marcadet and Studio Davout (Paris, France)
- Genre: Synth-pop
- Length: 40:34
- Label: Virgin
- Producer: Heaven 17

Heaven 17 chronology
How Men Are (1984)	Pleasure One (1986)	Teddy Bear, Duke & Psycho (1988)

US cover
- US cover

Singles from Pleasure One
- 1. "Contenders" Released: 6 October 1986; 2. "Trouble" Released: 5 January 1987

Pleasure One is the fourth studio album by the English synth-pop band Heaven 17, released on 17 November 1986 by Virgin Records. It was the band's last studio album chart entry within the UK Top 100.

== Background ==
Speaking of the album, Martyn Ware told Simon Mayo in 1986: "I realised that while it was taking me two days to programme a machine to play a few bars, a good musician could do it in 30 minutes and probably with more feeling. The public won't stand for intellectual twaddle any more. They want instant satisfaction. I think we have come up with a very good intelligent pop LP."

== Critical reception ==
Professional ratings
Review scores
Source	Rating
AllMusic	2.5/5 stars
Sounds	3/5 stars

Upon its release, Music & Media picked Pleasure One as one of their "Albums of the Week" and wrote: "The overall style of the album is one that will set the feet moving to the fast R&B sounds and recommended tracks include 'Contenders', 'Trouble' and 'Look at Me'." Paul Russell of the Sunday Independent wrote: "Yet another unmemorable LP from Heaven 17. As with How Men Are, Pleasure One has all the right ingredients and ideas. It's just that they're never given the proper mix. Technology takes over and the mood is left cold and distant." Russell picked "Contenders" as the album's only track to "capture you from the start".

Richard Cook of Sounds called Pleasure One the "mistaken response" to the commercial disappointment of its predecessor, How Men Are, as it "shuffl[es] Heaven 17 a little deeper into the mainstream". He wrote, "They still sound like a group theorising about pop, but the teasing line between theory and practice has lost its appeal. The lustre of their doctrinaire pop has gone dull somewhere in the production line. One waits in vain for the contagious melodies and body-snapping white beats." He added that Gregory's "elegant, marble crooning is now their only distinctive trick" and picked the "whispering, regretful ballad" "Look at Me" as a "chastening interlude". Katherine Donnelly of the Irish Independent commented: "Unfortunately, Heaven 17 [have] gone gradually downhill after their glittering start and Pleasure One is their most abysmal effort to date. The tunes sound forced, Glenn Gregory may as well be singing extracts from a computer manual for all the emotion he puts into his delivery and the lyrics veer between utter banality and offensive stupidity."

In the US, Billboard wrote: "Each side starts out with a bang in 'Contenders' and 'Red', ultrafunky dance numbers that are catchy and original. Though nothing else is quite as good, [the] album could catch a wide audience's ear." Helen Metella of the Edmonton Journal stated: "[Heaven 17] continue to produce stylish, civilized pop-soul at a snappy gait. It's impeccably recorded, politely sung and full of happy sentiments. But if I really desired 40 minutes of superior, self-congratulatory bombast that neither convinces me nor matters much, there are several snotty acquaintances in just about every time zone whom I could phone."

In a retrospective review, Aaron Badgley of AllMusic considered the album partially successful, but a disappointment compared to How Men Are: "Heaven 17 attempt to make a danceable political album, and on some levels they are successful. The groove and strong melodies are present, as is Gregory's usual stunning, deadpan vocals. Some of the songs are among their best, including "Trouble" and "Contenders". But other songs are overambitious and tedious. The ideas are there, but the songs are not executed to their fullest."

== Track listing ==
All tracks written and composed by Glenn Gregory, Ian Craig Marsh, and Martyn Ware.

Side one

1. "Contenders" – 5:24
2. "Trouble" – 4:14
3. "Somebody" – 4:30
4. "If I Were You" – 3:34
5. "Low Society" – 3:40

Side two

6. "Red" – 3:56
7. "Look at Me" – 5:14
8. "Move Out" – 3:18
9. "Free" – 6:25

== Personnel ==
=== Heaven 17 ===
- Glenn Gregory – lead and backing vocals
- Martyn Ware – E-mu Emulator II, Mellotron, E-mu SP-12 programming, backing vocals
- Ian Craig Marsh – Fairlight CMI programming

=== Additional musicians ===
- Nick Plytas – acoustic piano (9)
- Tim Cansfield – guitars (1–5, 7–9)
- John McGeoch – guitars (6)
- Ray Russell – guitars (6)
- Phil Spalding – bass guitar (1–3, 5–7, 9)
- Camelle Hinds – bass guitar (4)
- John Wilson – bass guitar (8)
- Preston Heyman – drums, percussion (5–8)
- Mel Gaynor – congas (6)
- Don Myrick – alto saxophone (3, 5)
- Louis Satterfield – trombone (3, 5)
- Rahmlee Michael Davis – trumpet (3, 5), flugelhorn (3, 5)
- Nolan Smith – trumpet (3, 5), flugelhorn (3, 5)
- Carol Kenyon – backing vocals (1, 3, 4, 7, 8)
- Gina Foster – backing vocals (5, 9)
- Janice Hoyst – backing vocals (5, 9)
- Beverley Skeete – backing vocals (5, 9)
- Guida De Palma – backing vocals (6)

== Production ==
- Heaven 17 – producers, arrangements, mixing, engineers, design concept
- Brian Tench – mixing, mix engineer
- Jeromy Allom – engineer (1, 6)
- Graham Bonnet – engineer
- Tim Hunt – engineer (1, 2, 4, 5, 7, 8, 9)
- Ben Knape – engineer (1, 6)
- Nick Davis – engineer (3)
- Jon Jacobs – engineer (3, 5)
- Ian Craig Marsh – technical consultant
- Kevin Mallett – photography
- Assorted Images – sleeve design

=== Studios ===
- Recorded at H17 HQ Studio, Townhouse 3, Red Bus Studios, Marcus Recording Studios, The Barge, AIR Studios and Roundhouse Studios (London, UK); Studio Marcadet and Studio Davout (Paris, France).
- Mixed at The Townhouse (London, UK).

== Charts ==
Chart performance for Pleasure One
Chart (1986–1987)	Peak position
UK Albums (OCC)	78
US Billboard 200	177
