= Life in One Day =

Single by Howard Jones

from the album Dream into Action
- B-side: "Learning How to Love"
- Released: 17 June 1985
- Studio: Farmyard (Little Chalfont, Buckinghamshire)
- Genre: New wave
- Length: 3:40
- Label: WEA
- Songwriter: Howard Jones
- Producer: Rupert Hine

Howard Jones singles chronology
"Look Mama" (1985)	"Life in One Day" (1985)	"No One Is to Blame" (1986)

Music video
- "Life in One Day" on YouTube

"Life in One Day" is the third single from Howard Jones' second studio album Dream into Action (1985). It is an uptempo number, which lyrically warns against wishing one's life away. It reached No. 14 on the UK singles chart, and No. 19 on the US Billboard Hot 100.

The 12" version features a pair of remixes of the lead track. Part One is a vocal mix, and Part Two a largely instrumental dub mix.

The UK B-side, "Boom Bap Respite", a piano instrumental, was not included in the US release. Instead the song was coupled with "Learning How to Love", a song previously available the UK on the single "Look Mama".

== Other versions ==
Jones, along with Afrodiziak who contributed backing vocals on the original, performed "Life in One Day" live in an a cappella style at the Shaftesbury Theatre in the London Borough of Camden as part of a series of music and alternative comedy shows held in April 1986 by the charity Comic Relief. A recording of this performance was issued later on the album Utterly Utterly Live.

Played by Jones on grand piano accompanied only by a percussionist, the song appeared on Jones' live album Live Acoustic America (1996).

An entirely re-recorded version featuring Jones' touring band at the time was included on the limited edition 2000 studio album Pefawm.

Another live rendition appeared on the 2007 album Live in Birkenhead, this time performed on piano and guitar.

== Music video ==
A promotional music video to accompany the song was produced by Godley & Creme. It featured Jones in a variety of roles, sometimes so heavily disguised as to be barely recognizable. It parodied a variety of television adverts and programmes in a series of vignettes, interrupted by visual effects simulating poor CRT television reception and other similar faults.

== Critical reception ==
Paul Quinn of Melody Maker said, "It's unbearable. It's horrible. I've never liked any of his records in the past, but this has to be one of the worst. It's completely vacuous."

== Track listings ==
7"

1. "Life in One Day" – 3:40
2. "Boom Bap Respite" – 2:48

7" Limited Edition

1. "Life in One Day" – 3:40
2. "Boom Bap Respite" – 2:48
3. "Always Asking Questions" (live at the Manchester Apollo)
4. "New Song" (live at the Manchester Apollo)

7" US single

1. "Life in One Day"
2. "Learning How to Love"

Released as a twinpack in a gatefold sleeve.

12"

1. "Life in One Day (Part One)" – 6:48
2. "Life in One Day (Part Two)" – 7:10
3. "Boom Bap Respite" – 2:48
