= Trouble (Heaven 17 song) =

Single by Heaven 17

from the album Pleasure One
- B-side: "Move Out"
- Released: 5 January 1987
- Genre: Synth-pop; new wave
- Length: 4:00
- Label: Virgin
- Songwriter(s): Glenn Gregory; Ian Craig Marsh; Martyn Ware
- Producer(s): Heaven 17

Heaven 17 singles chronology
"Contenders" (1986)	"Trouble" (1987)	"The Ballad of Go Go Brown" (1988)

Music video
- "Trouble" on YouTube

"Trouble" is a song by the English synth-pop band Heaven 17, released on 5 January 1987 by Virgin Records as the second and final single from their fourth studio album, Pleasure One (1986). It was written and produced by Glenn Gregory, Ian Craig Marsh and Martyn Ware. The song peaked at No. 51 on the UK singles chart and spent four weeks on the chart. It was a bigger success in Germany where it reached No. 17.

A music video was filmed to promote the single. The 12" single re-titled as "(Big) Trouble".

== Critical reception ==
On its release, Lesley O'Toole of Record Mirror wrote, "Once upon a time, if you didn't own a copy of 'Fascist Groove Thang', you were much too untrendy to be seen associating with. Since then, Heaven 17 have cobbled together the odd pearl of synthesised wisdom, but with decreasing regularity. 'Trouble' does little to alleviate fears that the rot is setting in, being just another mish-mash of unexciting keyboard riffs and irritatingly distinctive Glenn Gregory mouthings." John Lee of the Huddersfield Daily Examiner gave the song a six out of 10 rating and commented, "Certainly not the greatest Heaven 17 song of all time, 'Trouble' nevertheless chugs along very nicely." Paul Benbow of the Reading Evening Post stated, "The jaunty tune and lyrics spat out like machine gun fire don't really go together. Not their best effort."

Steve Mitchell of the Nottingham Evening Post awarded three out of five stars and wrote, "Modern computer-bop that Janice will plug, Peely will scorn and Smitty will spin twice." Andy Rutherford of the Gateshead Post commented, "A sadly redundant and seemingly endless keyboard dominated funk track from a band who used to write great songs." In a retrospective review of Pleasure One, Aaron Badgley of AllMusic praised the "wonderful" "Trouble" as one of the band's best tracks, adding that the "guitar work makes the song itself".

== Formats ==
7-inch single

1. "Trouble" – 4:00
2. "Move Out" – 3:19

12-inch single

1. "(Big) Trouble" – 5:49
2. "Trouble (LP version)" – 4:17
3. "Move Out" – 3:19

12-inch single (promo)

1. "Trouble (At Mill Mix)" – 6:42
2. "(Big) Trouble (Vocal)" – 5:49

12-inch single (limited edition gatefold)

1. "(Big) Trouble (Extended Mix)" – 5:51
2. "Move Out (Album Mix)" – 3:20
3. "Trouble (US Club Mix)" – 6:45
4. "Contenders (US Club Mix)" – 7:47

== Personnel ==
Heaven 17

- Glenn Gregory – lead and backing vocals, producer, arranger, mixing, engineer
- Martyn Ware – sampler (Emulator II), Mellotron, SP-12 programming, producer, arranger, mixing, engineer
- Ian Craig Marsh – Fairlight CMI programming, producer, arranger, mixing, engineer

Additional personnel

- Tim Cansfield – guitar
- Phil Spalding – bass
- Brian Tench – mixing
- Tim Hunt – engineer
- Bruce Forest – remixes of "Trouble (At Mill Mix)", "Contenders (US Club Mix)" and "Trouble (US Club Mix)"
- Heaven 17, Assorted Images – sleeve design
- Peter Anderson – photography

== Charts ==
Chart (1987)	Peak position
German Singles Chart	17
UK singles chart	51
