= Teddy Bear, Duke & Psycho =

Studio album by Heaven 17
- Released: 26 September 1988
- Genre: Synth-pop
- Length: 1:03:38
- Label: Virgin
- Producer: Heaven 17

Heaven 17 chronology
Pleasure One (1986)	Teddy Bear, Duke & Psycho (1988)	Higher and Higher: The Best of Heaven 17 (1993)

Singles from Teddy Bear, Duke & Psycho
- 1. "The Ballad of Go Go Brown" Released: 15 August 1988; 2. "Train of Love in Motion" Released: 31 October 1988

Teddy Bear, Duke & Psycho is the fifth studio album by the English synth-pop band Heaven 17, released on 26 September 1988 by Virgin Records, the band's last studio album for the label.

The album was not a commercial success and failed to enter the UK Albums Chart. The lead single "The Ballad of Go Go Brown" peaked at number 91 in the UK singles chart and the second, "Train of Love in Motion", failed to chart.

== Production ==
Speaking to International Musician and Recording World magazine in 1988, Ware said of Teddy Bear, Duke & Psycho: "This is the album that should have been made between Penthouse and Pavement and The Luxury Gap. A lot of the lyrical content is similar to side two of Penthouse." Comparing the album's greater use of synthesisers and sampling than the more organic Pleasure One (1986), Ware commented: "We decided that our strength lay in synthetic manipulation. We've actually absorbed the potential of sampling technology more than most bands. We're using it as a replacement and enhancement for real instruments, rather than as a little gimmick that's thrown in." The album's cover art is reminiscent of promotional material for the American drama film Midnight Cowboy (1969).

== Critical reception ==
Professional ratings
Review scores
Source	Rating
AllMusic	2.5/5 stars

Upon release, Music & Media commented: "After the lacklustre performance of their previous LP, Heaven 17 seem to have recovered some of the joie de vivre that made them so popular. The material now is more organic, lots of funky guitars and more than the occasional flash of 60s Motown in the sound and arrangements." Julian Baggini of the Reading Evening Post wrote: "Heaven 17's new album doesn't exactly break new ground, but tracks like "Big Square People" and "Responsibility" have the potential to attract big sales, simply by being fine examples of their type. For fans of Heaven 17, it will suffice that the band are continuing to do what they do well." Robin Denselow of The Guardian commented: "For those who want well-crafted British pop that's quirky and throw-away, there's Heaven 17. [The album is] a professional, sturdy collection of songs that mix funk and white soul with slick production work and the deep relaxed and very English vocals of Glenn Gregory."

The Journal stated: "I tried to like this. A chorus in one of the songs goes, "You got to sound like you mean it", and frankly the Sheffield lads don't, and sound like they want to take the money and run." Victoria Thieberger of Australian newspaper The Age wrote: "This album confirms a long, slow slide for Heaven 17. Since their pioneering synthpop on Penthouse and Pavement, the band has descended into the banal. Most of this album is irritatingly repetitive: doubtful lyrics chanted to an overbearing disco beat." Thieberger highlighted "The Ballad of Go-Go Brown" and "Don't Stop for No One" as the two standout tracks.

Dale Winnitowy of the Canadian Surrey Leader commented: "Full bodied production ties together glamorous soul and plenty of funky rumble-tumble rhythms. A strong album from Heaven 17, who I had thought were out for the count." In a retrospective review, Aaron Badgley of AllMusic considered the album to be "somewhat disappointing" compared to the band's previous two studio albums, adding: "This release saw Heaven 17 attempting to mix pop with R&B. But with all of the highlights, the CD just does not hold together well. The songs are overlong and the production is so slick that the melodies get lost in the mix."

== Track listing ==
All tracks are written by Glenn Gregory, Ian Craig Marsh and Martyn Ware.

No.	Title	Length
1.	"Big Square People"	4:29
2.	"Don't Stop for No One"	3:48
3.	"Snake and Two People"	3:49
4.	"Can You Hear Me?"	3:35
5.	"Hot Blood"	4:25
6.	"The Ballad of Go Go Brown"	3:42
7.	"Dangerous"	3:58
8.	"I Set You Free"	5:08
9.	"Train of Love in Motion"	4:45
10.	"Responsibility"	4:44

CD edition additional tracks
No.	Title	Length
11.	"Work"	3:36
12.	"Giving Up"	3:00
13.	"The Last Seven Days"	4:08
14.	"The Foolish Thing to Do"	3:35
15.	"Slow All Over"	6:39
Total length:		1:03:38

== Personnel ==
Heaven 17

- Glenn Gregory – lead vocals, backing vocals
- Martyn Ware – keyboards, synthesizers, programming, backing vocals
- Ian Craig Marsh – keyboards, synthesizers, programming

Additional musicians

- Nick Plytas – acoustic piano
- Tim Cansfield – guitars, arrangements
- Randy Hope-Taylor – bass guitar
- Gerry Conway – drums, percussion
- Pandit Dinesh – percussion
- Frank Mead – saxophones, harmonica
- Richard Niles – string arrangements
- Carol Kenyon – backing vocals

Other personnel

- Heaven 17 – producers, arrangements
- Graham Bonnet – engineer
- Phil Legg – engineer
- Jean Pierre Masclet – photography
- Assorted Images – sleeve design

== Charts ==
Chart performance for Teddy Bear, Duke & Psycho
Chart (1988)	Peak position
German Albums (Offizielle Top 100)	46
