= This Is Mine =

Single by Heaven 17

from the album How Men Are
- B-side: "Skin"
- Released: 15 October 1984
- Genre: Synth-pop; new wave
- Length: 3:20
- Label: Virgin; Arista
- Songwriters: Glenn Gregory; Ian Craig Marsh; Martyn Ware
- Producers: Martyn Ware; Greg Walsh

Heaven 17 singles chronology
"Sunset Now" (1984)	"This Is Mine" (1984)	"...(And That's No Lie)" (1985)

Music video
- "This Is Mine" on YouTube

"This Is Mine" is a song by the English synth-pop band Heaven 17, released on 15 October 1984 by Virgin Records as the second single from their third studio album, How Men Are (1984). It was written by Glenn Gregory, Ian Craig Marsh and Martyn Ware, and produced by Ware and Greg Walsh. The song reached No. 23 on the UK singles chart, remaining in the charts for seven weeks. It would be the band's last Top 30 single until 1992's "Temptation (Brothers in Rhythm Remix)"

== Music video ==
The accompanying music video for the track featured Gregory, Ware and Marsh plotting and robbing a bank. The video was filmed at Exmouth Market in London. The bank building that featured in the video is now a Caffè Nero coffeehouse. The video ends with the trio throwing cash from a helicopter over London.

== Critical reception ==
On its release, DJ Mark Hollis, writing for the Daily Mirror, praised "This Is Mine" as the band's "best single so far" and noted the "brass sound is tremendous". He predicted the song would reach the UK top five. Frank Edmonds of the Bury Free Press gave it a 9 out of 10 rating and wrote, "This is an excellent piece of catchy pop. Bright and breezy brass, blaring trumpets and a superb melody make this one not to miss." Paul Benbow of the Reading Evening Post described it as "brassy but a bit slow", and considered it a return to the sound of the band's debut studio album Penthouse and Pavement (1981).

== Formats ==
7-inch single

1. "This Is Mine" – 3:20
2. "Skin" – 3:40

12-inch single

1. "This Is Mine" (Filmix) – 7:18
2. "This Is Mine" (Cinemix) – 8:55
3. "Skin" – 3:40

12-inch single (UK release)

1. "This Is Mine" (Extended version) – 5:39
2. "Skin" – 3:39
3. "Mine" – 5:04

12-inch single (US promo)

1. "This Is Mine" (Filmix) – 7:18
2. "This Is Mine" (Radio version) – 3:20
3. "This Is Mine" (Cinemix) – 7:25

== Personnel ==
Credits sourced from the original album liner notes.

Heaven 17

- Glenn Gregory – lead and backing vocals
- Martyn Ware – Roland System 100 bass synthesizer, LinnDrum programming, backing vocals, producer
- Ian Craig Marsh – Fairlight CMI and Roland System 100 synthesizers

Additional personnel

- Greg Walsh – Roland System 100 bass synthesizer, Fairlight CMI programming, producer
- Don Myrick – saxophone (tenor solo)
- Michael Harris – flugelhorn
- The Phenix Horns – horns
- Mike Prior – photography

== Charts ==
Chart (1984)	Peak position
Irish Singles Chart	25
UK singles chart	23
US Billboard Dance/Club Play Singles	28
