= Afrodiziak =

British musical group; vocal trio

- Origin: United Kingdom
- Years active: 1982–1988
- Past members: Claudia Fontaine; Naomi Thompson; Caron Wheeler

Afrodiziak was a British singing group composed of Caron Wheeler, Claudia Fontaine, and later Naomi Thompson, that was active in the 1980s. As a duo, Wheeler and Fontaine were best known for performing backing vocals on the Jam's final single "Beat Surrender" in 1982 (on whose final tour they performed) and Elvis Costello's eighth studio album Punch the Clock (1983), especially its lead single, the international hit "Everyday I Write the Book".

After the addition of Naomi Thompson as a third member, Afrodiziak performed backing vocals on the hit single "Free Nelson Mandela", including the a cappella intro, staging it on Channel 4's music show The Tube in March 1984. Heaven 17's 1984 album How Men Are featured them prominently, especially on the singles "Sunset Now" and "...(And That's No Lie)". Afrodiziak performed on Madness's albums Keep Moving and Mad Not Mad in 1984 and 1985, appearing in the music video for that group's single "Sweetest Girl".

Also in 1985, Afrodiziak performed backing vocals on the first two songs on Howard Jones' second album, Dream into Action, both of which ("Things Can Only Get Better" and "Life in One Day") became worldwide hit singles; later that year, they went on tour as part of Jones's band. Other acts the group sang backup for include Ian Gillan, Aztec Camera, Maxi Priest, Aswad, Sam Brown, and Julia Fordham. Besides The Tube, Afrodiziak also appeared on Top of the Pops, The Old Grey Whistle Test, Solid Gold, and American Bandstand. They performed live at the Montreux Jazz Festival, Live Aid Japan, Red Nose Day of Charity, and the first Free Nelson Mandela Concert.

Caron Wheeler went on to fame as a featured vocalist in the dance-R&B collective Soul II Soul (she was the lead vocalist on the group's two biggest hits, "Keep on Movin'" and "Back to Life", the video for the latter track also featuring Fontaine as a backing vocalist) and had a brief career as a solo artist.

Claudia Fontaine continued working as a backing vocalist on albums by EMF, Neneh Cherry and Hothouse Flowers, among others, and appeared as a main vocalist with the British house music group the Beatmasters. She was featured among the Beatmasters' high-profile, often-changing vocalists, in particular on the 1989–90 dance club and pop chart success "Warm Love" (from the album Anywayawanna), and on "Deeper into Harmony" (from the 1991 album Life and Soul). Fontaine died on 13 March 2018.
