= The Foolish Thing to Do =

- Cover photography by Peter Ashworth

Single by Heaven 17
- B-side: "My Sensitivity (Gets in the Way)"
- Released: 21 April 1986
- Genre: Jazz, soul
- Length: 3:38
- Label: Virgin
- Songwriters: Glenn Gregory; Ian Craig Marsh; Martyn Ware, Nick Plytas
- Producer: British Electric Foundation

Heaven 17 singles chronology
"...(And That's No Lie)" (1985)	"The Foolish Thing to Do" (1986)	"Contenders" (1986)

"The Foolish Thing to Do" is a song by the English synth-pop band Heaven 17, featuring American singer Jimmy Ruffin. It was released by Virgin on 21 April 1986 as a non-album single. The song was written by Glenn Gregory, Ian Craig Marsh, Martyn Ware and Nick Plytas, and produced by Marsh and Ware (as the British Electric Foundation).

"The Foolish Thing to Do" reached number 80 in the UK Singles Charts and remained in the top 100 for two weeks. A music video was filmed to promote the single. The B-side, "My Sensitivity (Gets in the Way), is a cover of the Luther Vandross song. Ruffin performed lead vocals on both tracks.

For the CD version of Heaven 17's fifth studio album Teddy Bear, Duke & Psycho, released in 1988, a version of the song features Gregory performing the lead vocal.

== Background ==
Speaking to Record Mirror in 1986, Gregory spoke of how Heaven 17 came to work with Ruffin, "We wrote the song for a French film that we were doing some music for, and they wanted it in a certain mood. Ware knew Ruffin from the Council Collective, the Soul Deep thing, so he cheekily phoned him up, and asked him if he'd do a guide vocal for us. It turned out that the girl who was supposed to sing it in the film couldn't cut the cheese in the studio, and the vocal that Jimmy did was just so brilliant, anyway." Ruffin commented, "When I got the song from Martyn, I knew it was a better song than he realised. I thought right, I will sing this song so well, that this girl won't be able to do it. It was like, OK, I don't mind doing a guide vocal, but it'll be so good that they'll have to use it."

When the film project fell through, the band decided to release the song as a single. Ware commented, "After a six months wait, during which time the film project fell through, "The Foolish Thing to Do" was a little too good to waste, and a little too, er, smouldering for Mr Gregory's voice. It's obviously not in the Heaven 17 style, and we couldn't really envisage putting Glenn's voice on it. It would have been pointless, especially after Jimmy had done what appeared to be the definitive version."

== Critical reception ==
Upon its release, Dave Ling of Number One gave "The Foolish Thing to Do" a five out of five rating. He described the song as "an absolute gem", but felt the single's April release was too early, stating that "its laid-back feel is far more suited to long, lazy days of summer spent sipping exotic cocktails by a sunkissed beach". Dave Morgan of the Reading Evening Post praised it as "an excellent soulful track". He added that the single was worth buying for the B-side. Paul Massey of the Aberdeen Evening Express commented, "Really can't fail when Ruffin is joined by Gregory and Ware. Relaxed and smooth and a joy on the ears."

John Lee of the Huddersfield Daily Examiner noted that Ruffin "still sounds good" and described the song as "mellowness itself, but perhaps not mainstream enough to be a hit". Stuart Bailie of Record Mirror was critical of the song, commenting, "It's all a bit sad, really, that a collection of once distinguished characters should collaborate on such a banal piece of Radio 2 soul. Heaven 17 seem destined to become the very thing they once resisted – a bunch of institutionalised, clapped-out old studio hacks." Neil Spencer of Sounds called it "utterly disposable".

== Formats ==
7-inch single

1. "The Foolish Thing to Do" (Version 1) - 3:38
2. "My Sensitivity (Gets in the Way)" - 3:33

12-inch single

1. "The Foolish Thing to Do" (Version 1) - 3:37
2. "My Sensitivity (Gets in the Way)" - 3:32
3. "The Foolish Thing I Do" (Instrumental) - 3:37
4. "The Foolish Thing to Do" (Version 2) - 3:37

== Personnel ==
- Jimmy Ruffin - lead vocals
- Glenn Gregory - backing vocals
- Carol Kenyon - backing vocals on "My Sensitivity"
- Tim Cansfield - guitar
- Martyn Ware - Emulator II, backing vocals, producer
- Nick Plytas - piano on "The Foolish Thing to Do", piano and emulator on "My Sensitivity"
- Camelle Hinds - bass
- Preston Heyman - drums
- UK Orchestras - strings on "My Sensitivity"
- Richard Niles - string arrangements on "My Sensitivity"
- Ian Craig Marsh - producer

Other

- Assorted iMaGes - sleeve
- Peter Ashworth - photography

== Charts ==
Chart (1986)	Peak position
UK Singles Chart	80
