= Contenders (song) =

Single by Heaven 17

from the album Pleasure One
- B-side: Excerpts from "Diary of a Contender"
- Released: 6 October 1986
- Length: 4:28
- Label: Virgin
- Songwriters: Glenn Gregory; Ian Craig Marsh; Martyn Ware
- Producer: Heaven 17

Heaven 17 singles chronology
"The Foolish Thing to Do" (1986)	"Contenders" (1986)	"Trouble" (1987)

Music video
- "Contenders" on YouTube

"Contenders" is a song by the English synth-pop band Heaven 17, released on 6 October 1986 as the first single from their fourth studio album, Pleasure One. It was written and produced by Glenn Gregory, Ian Craig Marsh and Martyn Ware. The song reached No. 80 on the UK singles chart and spent four weeks on the chart. It also reached No. 6 on the U.S. Billboard Dance/Club Play Singles Chart.

== Background ==
"Contenders" preceded the release of Heaven 17's fourth studio album Pleasure One. The band hoped the single would provide them with a hit after the disappointing charting of their single with Jimmy Ruffin, "The Foolish Thing to Do", earlier in the year. Like that single, "Contenders" also reached No. 80 on the UK singles chart.

In a 1986 interview with Record Mirror, Martyn Ware said of the song, "It's about the way the superpowers are constantly squaring off against each other. Look at all the struggles going on in the world, they're trying to carve the place up; everybody wants to be a contender, but at the same time they're not dealing with the real business."

== Music video ==
The song's music video was directed by Leslie Libman and Larry Williams, and produced by Jane Reardon for Libman/Moore Productions. It was shot in California. Glenn Gregory revealed to Record Mirror, "We used 50 black dancers. They were doing all sorts of crazy things, lots of breaking and making shapes all over the place. During one part of the action, they got me to do a back flip. With the title of the single being 'Contenders', it does hint that we would have done a Frankie-type video. World leaders and all that taking each other on. But we wanted to get away from those ideas as much as possible."

== Critical reception ==
Upon its release, Paul Benbow of the Reading Evening Post praised "Contenders" for being the "best thing they have done for ages". He wrote, "The boys show the young pretenders the right way to use an electro sound by adding a great beat and blue-eyed soul lyrics." John Lee of the Huddersfield Daily Examiner described the "crispy and choppy" song as "the brightest Heaven 17 single for some time". He added that Gregory's vocals "combine neatly with funky guitaring to make a song which breaks down the barriers between dancefloor and pop chart".

Simon Reynolds of Melody Maker commented, "This one practically hurls itself off the ropes at you, solid funk brawn but light on its feet, bobbing and weaving, jabbing and pummeling and always on the attack, but, somehow, failing to deliver that hook to floor you completely. The killer blow never comes." Jack Barron of Sounds stated, "The rhythm guitar on this stutters stunningly, but the lyrical implication that our political struggle is inextricably linked to Heaven 17's career is sheer hell." Cath Carroll of the NME was critical of the song, calling it "feeble, finger-snapping jive-talk from Heaven 17 which is even more disappointing than you'd probably imagine".

== Formats ==
7-inch single

1. "Contenders" – 4:28
2. "Excerpts from "Diary of a Contender" – 5:24

12-inch single

1. "Contenders (Dance version)" – 6:23
2. "Excerpts from 'Diary of a Contender'" – 5:24
3. "Contenders (Full length version)" – 5:19

12-inch single (US release)

1. "Contenders (Dance version)" – 7:45
2. "Contenders (Edited version) " – 3:10
3. "Contenders (Instrumental version)" – 5:12
4. "Contenders (Go Go version)" – 6:39

12-inch single (limited edition gatefold)

1. "Contenders (Dance version)" – 6:22
2. "Excerpts from 'Diary of a Contender'" – 5:24
3. "Penthouse and Pavement" – 6:33
4. "Megamix (Edit)" – 6:36

== Personnel ==
Heaven 17

- Glenn Gregory – lead and backing vocals, producer, arranger, mixing, engineer
- Martyn Ware – sampler (E-mu Emulator II), Mellotron, E-mu SP-12 programming, producer, arranger, mixing, engineer
- Ian Craig Marsh – Fairlight CMI programming, producer, arranger, mixing, engineer

Additional personnel

- Carol Kenyon – backing vocals
- Tim Cansfield – guitar
- Phil Spalding – bass guitar
- Brian Tench – mixing
- Tim Hunt, Ben Knape – engineers
- John 'Tokes' Potoker – remixer of "Penthouse and Pavement"
- Sanny X – remixer of "Megamix (Edit)"

== Charts ==
Chart (1986–87)	Peak position
UK singles chart	80
US Billboard Dance/Club Play Singles	6
US Billboard Hot Dance Music Sales	23
