= Train of Love in Motion =

1988 song by Heaven 17

Single by Heaven 17

from the album Teddy Bear, Duke & Psycho
- B-side: "Work"
- Released: 31 October 1988
- Length: 4:45 (album version); 3:29 (single version)
- Label: Virgin
- Songwriters: Glenn Gregory; Ian Craig Marsh; Martyn Ware
- Producer: Heaven 17

Heaven 17 singles chronology
"The Ballad of Go Go Brown" (1988)	"Train of Love in Motion" (1988)	"Temptation (Brothers in Rhythm Remix)" (1992)

Official audio
- "Train of Love in Motion" on YouTube

"Train of Love in Motion" is a song by the English synth-pop band Heaven 17, released on 31 October 1988 by Virgin Records as the second and final single from their fifth studio album, Teddy Bear, Duke & Psycho. The song was written and produced by band members Glenn Gregory, Ian Craig Marsh and Martyn Ware.

== Background ==
"Train of Love in Motion" was released as the second and final single from the band's fifth studio album, Teddy Bear, Duke & Psycho, on 31 October 1988. It failed to reach the top 100 of the UK singles chart, but did make an appearance for a single week on the Music Week Airplay chart for the week ending 26 November 1988 based on the airplay it received from regional radio stations. It was the band's last single featuring new material until 1996's "Designing Heaven".

In his 2022 book Electronically Yours – Vol. I: My Autobiography, Martyn Ware had mixed feelings on the track. He stated it "sounds more like a traditionally successful Heaven 17 song" and is "catchy, in a chanty pop style", with an introduction similar to David Bowie's 1976 song "Station to Station". He recalled it was "quite optimistically released as a single", but also felt it was an example of there being "too much responsibility put on a simple band instrumentation framework to make average songwriting into something more attractive". He continued, "Where is Heaven 17 as we know it? An outro featuring banjo? For fuck's sake."

== Critical reception ==
Upon its release as a single, Music & Media praised "Train of Love in Motion" as "one of the best tracks from the new album and likely to be their first hit in a long time". Andrew Hirst of the Huddersfield Daily Examiner commented that it is "a rattling good ditty from Sheffield's bastions of originality". Michael O'Donnell of the Londonderry Sentinel noted that Heaven 17 "seem at last to [be] getting back into their stride again" and continued, "Once an act drops out of the music scene for a time it is very difficult to get back, no matter how good the material is and Heaven 17 look like they are going to suffer because of this which is a shame."

David Stubbs of Melody Maker noted the song had "a bit of funky velocity" and called it "an anachronism", as he felt it was "in the tradition of the greatly superior" "Trans-Europe Express" by the German electronic band Kraftwerk and "Moscow Discow" by the Belgian synth-pop group Telex. He added, "But when [Gregory] sings 'Train of love in motion/powered by emotion', in those flat, Syd Little tones, we're talking, frankly, Positive Noise." Paul Massey of the Aberdeen Evening Express considered it to be "strong and powerful, but lacking that special touch" and concluded it was "not their best".

Marcus Hodge of the Cambridge Evening News was critical of the track, calling it "sub-standard funk" with Heaven 17 "sound[ing] like a group going through the motions and nothing more". He added, "A once-great band are these days missing the train with frightening regularity." Matthew Collin of Record Mirror remarked, "Despite the renewed popularity of all things synthetic, Heaven 17 manage to string together a series of the most banal pop clichés imaginable, in what sounds like total desperation. Sad."

== Formats ==
7-inch single (UK and Europe)

1. "Train of Love in Motion" – 3:29
2. "Work" – 3:37

12-inch single (UK and Europe)

1. "Train of Love in Motion" (The Mainline Mix) – 5:55
2. "Work" – 3:37
3. "Train of Love in Motion" (7" Version) – 3:29
4. "Giving Up" – 3:03

CD single (UK)

1. "Train of Love in Motion" (7" Version) – 3:29
2. "Work" – 3:37
3. "Train of Love in Motion" (The Mainline Mix) – 5:55
4. "Giving Up" – 3:03

== Personnel ==
Heaven 17

- Glenn Gregory
- Martyn Ware
- Ian Craig Marsh

Production

- Heaven 17 – production

Other

- Assorted Images – sleeve
- Jean-Pierre Masclet – photography

== Charts ==
Chart (1988)	Peak position
UK singles chart (Gallup)	122
