= Sunset Now =

Single by Heaven 17

from the album How Men Are
- B-side: "Counterforce"
- Released: 20 August 1984
- Genre: Synth-pop; new wave
- Length: 3:40
- Label: Virgin; Arista
- Songwriters: Glenn Gregory; Ian Craig Marsh; Martyn Ware
- Producers: British Electric Foundation; Greg Walsh

Heaven 17 singles chronology
| "Crushed by the Wheels of Industry" (1983) | "Sunset Now" (1984) | "This Is Mine" (1984) |

Music video
- "Sunset Now" on YouTube

"Sunset Now" is a song by the English synth-pop band Heaven 17, released on 20 August 1984 as the first single from their third studio album, How Men Are (1984). It was written by Glenn Gregory, Ian Craig Marsh and Martyn Ware, and produced by Marsh and Ware (British Electric Foundation) and Greg Walsh. It reached No. 24 in the UK, remaining on the charts for six weeks. A music video was filmed to promote the single.

== Critical reception ==
Upon release, Adrian Thrills of the NME stated: "It is difficult to take an active dislike to Heaven 17, but it is even harder to find anything other than flat, flawless worthinness in their music. I'd love 'Sunset Now' if I could, but it tells me nothing about the frenzy of political struggle or even how I feel about my all-time favourite dancer. It is merely another record, another numb artefact. I guess the Fairlight is just not the instrument from which dreams are made." Andy Coyne for Sounds wrote: "Hardly a great achievement from the creators of "Fascist Groove Thang" but as pop fare it's strong enough. I know this is going to really irritate after about two weeks. Oh, what could have been."

Paul Simper from Number One commented: "More happy returns. A year on, Heaven 17 seem to have refined the mannered funk of 'Crushed By The Wheels'. 'Sunset Now' sees Glenn Gregory in fine voice, with Afrodiziak helping out on backing vocals, and points to an excellent third album in September." Aaron Badgley of AllMusic retrospectively said: "'Sunset Now', 'Flamedown' and the brilliant 'This Is Mine' are just a few of the reasons for this album's greatness".

== Formats ==
7-inch single

1. "Sunset Now" – 3:40
2. "Counterforce" – 3:02

12-inch single

1. "Sunset Now (Extended version)" – 5:21
2. "Flamedown" – 3:14
3. "Counterforce" – 3:02
4. " Sunset Now (Album version)" – 3:40
5. "Counterforce II" – 3:08

12-inch single (US release)

1. "Sunset Now (LP version)" – 3:40
2. "Counterforce 1" – 3:02
3. "Sunset Now (Extended version)" – 5:21

Cassette single

1. "Sunset Now (Album version)" – 3:42
2. "Counterforce" – 3:02
3. "Sunset Now (Extended version)" – 5:20
4. "Flamedown" – 3:14
5. "Counterforce" – 3:02
6. "Sunset Now (Album version)" – 3:42
7. "Counterforce II" – 3:07

First two tracks not credited on cover.

== Personnel ==
Credits sourced from the original album liner notes

Heaven 17

- Glenn Gregory – lead and backing vocals
- Martyn Ware – LinnDrum programming, backing vocals, producer
- Ian Craig Marsh – Fairlight CMI synthesizer, producer

Additional personnel

- Greg Walsh – Fairlight CMI programming, producer
- Afrodiziak – backing vocals

== Charts ==
| Chart (1984) | Peak position |
|---|---|
| Australia (Kent Music Report) | 93 |
| Irish Singles Chart | 18 |
| UK singles chart | 24 |
| US Hot Dance/Disco Club Play | 39 |
