= How Men Are =

Studio album by Heaven 17
- Released: 24 September 1984
- Studios: AIR (London); CBS (London)
- Genre: Synth-pop
- Length: 38:18
- Label: Virgin
- Producers: B.E.F.; Greg Walsh

Heaven 17 chronology
The Luxury Gap (1983)	How Men Are (1984)	Pleasure One (1986)

Singles from How Men Are
- 1. "Sunset Now" Released: 20 August 1984; 2. "This Is Mine" Released: 15 October 1984; 3. "...(And That's No Lie)" Released: 7 January 1985

How Men Are is the third studio album by the English synth-pop band Heaven 17, released on 24 September 1984 by Virgin Records. The album peaked at No. 12 on the UK Albums Chart and was certified silver (60,000 copies sold) by the BPI in October 1984.

Three singles were released from the album: "Sunset Now" (UK No. 24), "This Is Mine" (UK No. 23) in 1984, and an edited remix of "...(And That's No Lie)" (UK No. 52) in early 1985, which was the first Heaven 17 single to fail to reach the top 40 of the UK Singles Chart since "Let Me Go" at the end of 1982.

Although digital sample-based instruments such as the Fairlight CMI and the LinnDrum drum machine were still responsible for most of the album's sounds, How Men Are marked the beginning of an increased usage of acoustic instruments in Heaven 17's music. A small orchestra is employed on three tracks, and two tracks make use of the Phenix Horns Esquire, Earth, Wind & Fire's brass section. Another notable contribution to the album was made by the vocal group Afrodiziak, who sang on four tracks.

In 2006, Heaven 17's first three albums, including How Men Are, were remastered and reissued with bonus tracks.

== Reception ==
Professional ratings
Review scores
Source	Rating
AllMusic	4.5/5 stars
PopMatters	7/10
Record Mirror	4/5 stars
Smash Hits	8/10
Sounds	3/5 stars

In a retrospective review for AllMusic, Aaron Badgley deemed How Men Are Heaven 17's "strongest, most brilliant album", finding that the band had managed "to expand and build on their solid sound", while also expressing "more personal and political statements that were not clearly heard on their first two albums."

== Track listing ==
All songs written and composed by Glenn Gregory, Ian Craig Marsh, and Martyn Ware, except where noted.

Side one

1. "Five Minutes to Midnight" – 3:46
2. "Sunset Now" – 3:35
3. "This Is Mine" – 3:51
4. "The Fuse" – 3:05
5. "Shame Is on the Rocks" – 3:59

Side two

6. "The Skin I'm In" – 3:46
7. "Flamedown" – 2:59
8. "Reputation" (John Wilson, Glenn Gregory, Ian Craig Marsh, Martyn Ware) – 3:03
9. "And That's No Lie" – 10:02

=== Additional tracks ===
2006 remastered CD bonus tracks

10. "This Is Mine (Cinemix)" – 8:43
11. "...(And That's No Lie) (Re-mixed to Enhance Danceability)" – 6:17
12. "Counterforce II" – 3:08
13. "Sunset Now (Extended Version)" – 5:21

All bonus tracks originally appeared on various formats of the singles taken from the album and had never appeared on CD before. "Counterforce II" was originally a B-side from the "Sunset Now" 12-inch single, and was also released under the title "Chase Runner" on the Electric Dreams soundtrack.

== Personnel ==
=== Heaven 17 ===
- Glenn Gregory – lead and backing vocals
- Martyn Ware – LinnDrum programming, backing vocals, Roland System 100 bass (3)
- Ian Craig Marsh – Fairlight CMI programming, backing vocals (1), Roland System 100 (3, 6)

=== Session musicians ===
- Greg Walsh – Fairlight CMI programming, Roland System 100 bass (3)
- Nick Plytas – Roland System 100 simulated classical guitar (6), acoustic piano (8, 9)
- Ray Russell – guitars (5, 7, 9)
- John Wilson – guitars (8), bass guitar (9)
- Mo Foster – fretless bass (6)
- Phenix Horns Esquire – horns (3, 7)
- Michael Harris – flugelhorn (3)
- David Cullen – orchestral arrangements and conductor (1, 6, 9)
- Afrodiziak – backing vocals (2, 4, 8, 9)

=== Production ===
- B.E.F. – producers
- Greg Walsh – producer, engineer
- Jeremy Allom – engineer
- Ray Smith – cover paintings, photography, cover concept

== Charts ==
Chart performance for How Men Are
Chart (1984)	Peak position
Dutch Albums (Album Top 100)	28
European Albums (Music & Media)	21
German Albums (Offizielle Top 100)	31
Swedish Albums (Sverigetopplistan)	28
UK Albums (Official Charts)	12

== Certifications ==
Certifications for How Men Are
Region	Certification	Certified units/sales
United Kingdom (BPI)	Silver	60,000^{^}
^{^} Shipments figures based on certification alone.
