= ...(And That's No Lie) =

Single by Heaven 17

from the album How Men Are
- B-side: "The Fuse"
- Released: 7 January 1985
- Genre: Synth-pop; new wave
- Length: 3:25
- Label: Virgin
- Songwriters: Glenn Gregory; Ian Craig Marsh; Martyn Ware
- Producers: Martyn Ware; Greg Walsh

Heaven 17 singles chronology
| "This Is Mine" (1984) | "...(And That's No Lie)" (1985) | "The Foolish Thing to Do" (1986) |

Music video
- "...(And That's No Lie)" on YouTube

"...(And That's No Lie)" is a song by the English synth-pop band Heaven 17, released on 7 January 1985 by Virgin Records as the third single from their third studio album, How Men Are (1984). The song was written by Glenn Gregory, Ian Craig Marsh and Martyn Ware, and produced by Ware and Greg Walsh. It reached number 52 in the UK singles chart and remained in the top 100 for five weeks. A music video was filmed to promote the single.

In the UK, the 12-inch single was issued in five different sleeves. All track listings were the same, except on the fifth and final 12-inch variation, which contains the exclusive "The Heaven 17 Megamix". It features extracts of "This Is Mine", "Crushed by the Wheels of Industry", "The Height of the Fighting (He-La-Hu)", "Penthouse and Pavement", "Temptation", "I'm Your Money" and "Play to Win".

== Critical reception ==
On its release as a single, Martin Townsend of Number One picked "...(And That's No Lie)" as joint "single of the week" and predicted it would be a minor hit. He considered it to be "a densely melodic 7-inch and a truly awesome ten-minute ride on the 12-inch". Mike Gardiner of Record Mirror felt it was "another disappointing release from a group who should know better". He compared the song to "looking at a construction site" which is "messy, noisy, a lot of activity but the building's only half complete". Danny Kelly of NME commented, "This highlights the oft forgotten melodic strengths of Heaven 17 but are we really expected to get excited about a three minute edit from a ten minute track, the fourth A side from a non too thrilling LP?" He questioned how successful the single would be in the charts, but noted the "nice sleeve".

DJ Mark Hollis, writing for the Daily Mirror stated, "Heaven 17 disappointed me with this on first hearing. Maybe a few plays will change that." Frank Edmonds of the Bury Free Press gave the song a 5 out of 10 rating and wrote, "After two great singles this is pretty damn boring." In a retrospective review of How Men Are, Aaron Badgley of AllMusic picked the song as a "highlight", describing it as "very long but very wonderful". He noted the "strong melody", "stunning vocals" and "tight production".

== Formats and track listings ==
7-inch single

1. "...(And That's No Lie)" – 3:25
2. "The Fuse" – 3:53

12-inch single

1. "...(And That's No Lie)" (Re-mixed to Enhance its Danceability) – 6:10
2. "The Fuse" (LP version) – 3:05
3. "...(And That's No Lie)" (LP version) – 10:02

12-inch single (UK 5/5 release)

1. "...(And That's No Lie)" (Re-mixed to Enhance its Danceability) – 6:10
2. "The Fuse" (LP version) – 3:05
3. "The Heaven 17 Megamix" – 8:28

== Personnel ==
Credits sourced from the original album liner notes.

Heaven 17

- Glenn Gregory – lead and backing vocals
- Martyn Ware – LinnDrum programming, backing vocals, producer
- Ian Craig Marsh – Fairlight CMI synthesizer

Additional personnel

- Greg Walsh – producer
- Nick Plytas – piano
- Ray Russell – guitars
- John Wilson – bass guitar
- David Cullen – orchestral arrangements and conductor
- Afrodiziak – backing vocals
- Sanny X – remixer of "The Heaven 17 Megamix"

== Charts ==
| Chart (1985) | Peak position |
|---|---|
| Irish Singles Chart | 22 |
| UK singles chart | 52 |
