= Things Can Only Get Better (Howard Jones song) =

1985 synth-pop single

Single by Howard Jones

from the album Dream into Action
- B-side: "Why Look for the Key"
- Released: 1 February 1985
- Studio: Farmyard (Little Chalfont, Buckinghamshire)
- Genre: New wave; synth-pop
- Length: 3:59
- Label: WEA; Elektra
- Songwriter: Howard Jones
- Producer: Rupert Hine

Howard Jones singles chronology
"Like to Get to Know You Well" (1984)	"Things Can Only Get Better" (1985)	"Look Mama" (1985)

Music video
- "Things Can Only Get Better" on YouTube

"Things Can Only Get Better" was released as the first single from Howard Jones' second studio album Dream into Action (1985). In the US, the song reached number 5 on the Billboard Hot 100 chart and hit number 6 on the UK singles chart.

== Background ==
A typically upbeat Jones composition, it was one of two songs from the album to feature all-female singing group Afrodiziak on backing vocals. John Leland from Spin magazine wrote that "It mines the best of the Anglo soul movement: a clean slap-bass line, precise horns and synths, and some well-paced and inviting singing".

The main B-side was another album track from the UK version of the album, "Why Look for the Key", although with a slightly longer fade that made it about twenty seconds longer than the version on the UK version of Dream into Action. "You Jazzy Nork!" is a reworked instrumental version of "Why Look for the Key" performed by the Alphonse Conway Orchestra.

The cover of the 12" single featured a photograph of Jones, in profile, sitting on a high bar stool. This image was used in silhouette for the 7" artwork, the single being issued in several alternative sleeves with different colour backgrounds.

== Music video ==
The music video depicts Jones singing the song as his road crew sets up equipment for a concert, followed by a transition to the show as he performs for a lively crowd. A martial artist styled after Daniel LaRusso, the protagonist of the American martial arts drama film The Karate Kid (1984), and the Tramp character made famous by Charlie Chaplin wander around backstage during the setup and later appear in the crowd. At the end of the video, the Tramp walks off hand in hand with a young girl who had earlier watched the crew at work.

== Track listings ==
7" Elektra – 7-69651 (US)

1. "Things Can Only Get Better" – 3:59
2. "Why Look for the Key" – 3:40

12" Elektra – 0-66915 (US)

1. "Things Can Only Get Better (LP Version)" – 3:59
2. "What Is Love? (New Extended Version)" – 6:34
3. "Things Can Only Get Better (Extended Version)" – 7:26
4. "New Song (New Version)" – 4:48

Both a 7" and 12" picture disc were released with the same tracks as the standard formats.

== Remixes ==
In 2005, the Swedish DJ and record producer Eric Prydz released a remixed version and renamed it "And Do You Feel Scared?". It is featured in the video game 2006 FIFA World Cup as one of the many EA Trax that appear in the game.

In 2013, the French DJ, record producer and actor Cedric Gervais released a song featuring the vocal track from Howard Jones' original song. It too was titled "Things Can Only Get Better".

== Chart history ==
"Things Can Only Get Better" reached number six in the UK singles chart and number five in the United States on the Billboard Hot 100 chart. The song also crossed over to the R&B charts in America, peaking at number 54.

Chart (1985)	Position
Australia (Kent Music Report)	11
Canada RPM Top Singles	9
Ireland (IRMA)	5
Italian Singles Chart	13
Sweden	3
UK singles chart	6
US Mainstream Rock Tracks	21
US Billboard Hot 100	5
US Dance/Club Play Songs	10
US Billboard Hot Black Singles	54

Year-end chart (1985)	Rank
US Top Pop Singles (Billboard)	41

== In popular culture ==
This song was featured in episode 5 of the Watchmen TV series, in a short sequence set in 1985. This song was also featured in the soundtrack to the 2018 movie Bumblebee. This song was also used in series 2, episode 5 of the television series Halt and Catch Fire. This song also has a Simlish version in the game' expansion pack, The Sims 2: Open for Business, on the New Wave in-game radio station. A portion of the song is used in the 2024 horror film Tarot. This song was also used in the Kerbal Space Program 2 early access launch cinematic trailer. This is also played as a background song during the birthday gathering of Ed Warren in the film The Conjuring: Last Rites (2025).
