= Everyday I Write the Book =

- UK cover art

Single by Elvis Costello and the Attractions

from the album Punch the Clock
- B-side: "Heathen Town"
- Released: Early July 1983
- Genre: Philadelphia soul; pop
- Length: 3:54
- Label: F-Beat
- Songwriter: Elvis Costello
- Producers: Clive Langer, Alan Winstanley assisted by Gavin Greenaway, Colin Fairley

Elvis Costello and the Attractions singles chronology
"Pills and Soap" (1983)	"Everyday I Write the Book" (1983)	"Let Them All Talk" (1983)

Music video
- "Everyday I Write the Book" on YouTube

"Everyday I Write the Book" is a song written by Elvis Costello, from Punch the Clock, an album released in 1983 by Elvis Costello and the Attractions. It charted on the UK Singles Chart on 9 July, before peaking at No. 28. It was also their first top 40 hit single in the U.S., peaking at No. 36 on the Billboard Hot 100.

== Background ==
In an interview from November 1998, Costello said "Everyday I Write the Book" was "a song I wrote in ten minutes almost as a challenge to myself. I thought, maybe I could write just a simple, almost formula song and make it mean something. I was quite happy with it and I tried to do it in a kind of lovers-rock type arrangement and I wasn't happy with it and then ended up putting this other kind of rhythm to the song, which was written originally as a kind of Merseybeat knock off...I invested less emotionally in it than any other songs from that time yet it's the one that everyone warmed to."

Costello also cited Nick Lowe and Rockpile as an influence on the song; he explained, "[Lowe] has always been a songwriter from whom I've taken cues — see his song 'When I Write the Book,' and my song 'Everyday I Write the Book'."

== Lyrics ==
The lyrics draw various parallels between romance and the process of writing a book. The narrator identifies himself as "a man with a mission in two or three editions" and tells his lover "your compliments and your cutting remarks are captured here in my quotation marks." He also compares the stages of their relationship with chapters in a book, saying:

Chapter One, we didn't really get along
Chapter Two; I think I fell in love with you
You said you'd stand by me in the middle of Chapter Three
But you were up to your old tricks in Chapters Four, Five and Six

== Video ==
The music video for "Everyday I Write the Book" was directed by Don Letts and has been called a "classic MTV hit" and features footage of Elvis Costello and the Attractions performing in a studio with female backup singers Claudia Fontaine and Caron Wheeler dressed in African clothing and kente cloth headwraps. Footage of Costello and his bandmates performing is mingled with footage showing celebrity lookalikes of Prince Charles and Diana, Princess of Wales, Charles incongruously doing household chores and Diana watching television in a middle class domicile. Clips of the silent films being watched by Diana are included in the montage.

When Prince Charles appears wielding a rapier and wearing a swashbuckler costume like that of the actors in the silent film, Princess Diana rolls her eyes and returns her attention to the television. Further attempts by Prince Charles to impress his spouse—including presenting her with a red rose and jumping through a flaming hoop—are similarly rebuffed as she is more interested in the romances depicted on her television. Costello later commented that he had "no idea" of the reason for the interspersed royalty scenes, which were, he says, the director's idea. At one point, the singer drops two stone tablets similar to those in the classic film The Ten Commandments and they are smashed.

== "Heathen Town" ==
The single was backed with the non-album B-side "Heathen Town", which Costello described as his answer song to the Flying Burrito Brothers' "Sin City". It later was released on the compilation Out of Our Idiot.

== Reviews ==
Cash Box said that "a typically witty lyric and song structure uses literary metaphors, female backup vocals, and multitextured keyboard-based arrangement in living up to the songwriter’s rep as a pop tunesmith nonpareil." A reviewer for AllMusic described this song and one other as the best on Punch the Clock and said they work well as "shiny pop singles." A writer for Stylus Magazine wrote it is one of three best songs on that album and that its "fractured keyboards" feature the most successful use of the "overdub cut-and-paste style." Robert Christgau included this song among those Elvis Costello hits "you like so much you think you understand them." According to one source, the theme of the song's "hopeless pop romantic" lyrics are about "struggling to make his marriage work." Mike Joyce of the Smiths named the song as his favorite record.

== Costello's live performances ==
I like singing it now, but I don't much care for the record.

— Costello in a June 2009 interview

Costello has referred to "Everyday I Write the Book" as "a bad Smokey Robinson song"; in a June 1994 Central Park concert, it was one of only two of his best-known songs performed without remaining faithful to the original recording, with Costello instead performing it in what he called its "original" version. A review of an August 2009 performance at the Ravinia Festival with "the Sugarcanes" was described as having its "hooky chorus turned into a dour lament". In October 2015 Costello performed an acoustic version of the song as the conclusion to on stage book tour interviews promoting his memoir Unfaithful Music & Disappearing Ink (2015).

== Appearances ==
The song was re-released on the 1985 compilation album The Best of Elvis Costello and The Attractions, the 1994 compilation album The Very Best of Elvis Costello and The Attractions 1977–86, and twice (1999 and 2001) on The Very Best of Elvis Costello, on first the PolyGram label then the Rhino label. It is also included on the 2007 compilation The Best of Elvis Costello: The First 10 Years. The song appeared in 1998 on the soundtrack album for The Wedding Singer.

In 2010, in appearances premiering within a month of each other, the song was chosen by both Robert Harris and Nick Park as one of their "Desert Island Discs."

== Charts ==
Chart (1983)	Peak position
UK Singles (Official Charts)	28
US Billboard Hot 100	36
US Top Rock Tracks	33
