= Little Chalfont =

Village in Buckinghamshire, England

Coordinates: 51.667°N 0.560°W

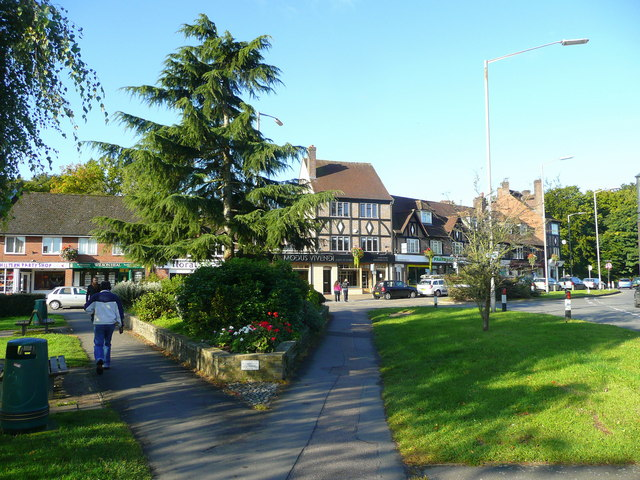
- Nightingales Corner, Little Chalfont

- Location within Buckinghamshire
- Population: 6,858 (2017 est.)
- OS grid reference: SU995975
  - London: 22 miles (35 km) SE
- Civil parish: Little Chalfont
- Unitary authority: Buckinghamshire
- Ceremonial county: Buckinghamshire
- Region: South East
- Country: England
- Sovereign state: United Kingdom
- Post town: AMERSHAM
- Postcode district: HP6, HP7
- Post town: CHALFONT ST. GILES
- Postcode district: HP8
- Dialling code: 01494
- Police: Thames Valley
- Fire: Buckinghamshire
- Ambulance: South Central
- UK Parliament: Chesham and Amersham

Little Chalfont is a village and civil parish in south-east Buckinghamshire, England. It is one of a group of villages known collectively as "The Chalfonts", which also comprises Chalfont St Giles and Chalfont St Peter. Little Chalfont is located around 2 miles (3.2 km) east of Amersham and 21.9 miles (35.2 km) northwest of Charing Cross, central London.

== History ==
Little Chalfont is a 20th-century creation triggered by the coming of the Metropolitan Railway. A station called Chalfont Road was opened in 1889 at the northernmost point of Chalfont St Giles Parish where the parishes of Amersham, Chenies, and Chalfont St Giles met. At that time, the area was remote from the centres of the villages and towns, and consisted of isolated farms and cottages, and did not have a specific name.

The coming of the railway eventually brought local housing development, and a community developed around the station, which was renamed Chalfont & Latimer station in 1915, a name which it retains today.

The first appearance of the name Little Chalfont is in the minutes of the Chalfont St Giles Parish Council on 15 January 1925, when, at the request of the inhabitants, it was agreed that the group of houses near the station should be named Little Chalfont instead of "Chalfont Road Village". For many years, Little Chalfont was split mainly in the Amersham Town Council area, and partly in Chalfont St Giles parish. Following a period of campaigning by local residents, the village was awarded separate Parish status in 2007. Most of the new Parish came from Amersham, but a small part (in area, rather larger in population) of Chalfont St Giles was also included.

== Transport ==
Little Chalfont is served by Chalfont & Latimer station, on the Metropolitan line of the London Underground and the London to Aylesbury Line of Chiltern Railways. There are also bus services to Amersham, Chesham and other surrounding towns and villages.

== Education ==
There are three schools in Little Chalfont: two primary schools (Little Chalfont Primary School, and Chalfont Valley E-ACT Primary Academy (formerly Bell Lane Primary School), and Dr Challoner's High School - a girls' grammar school.

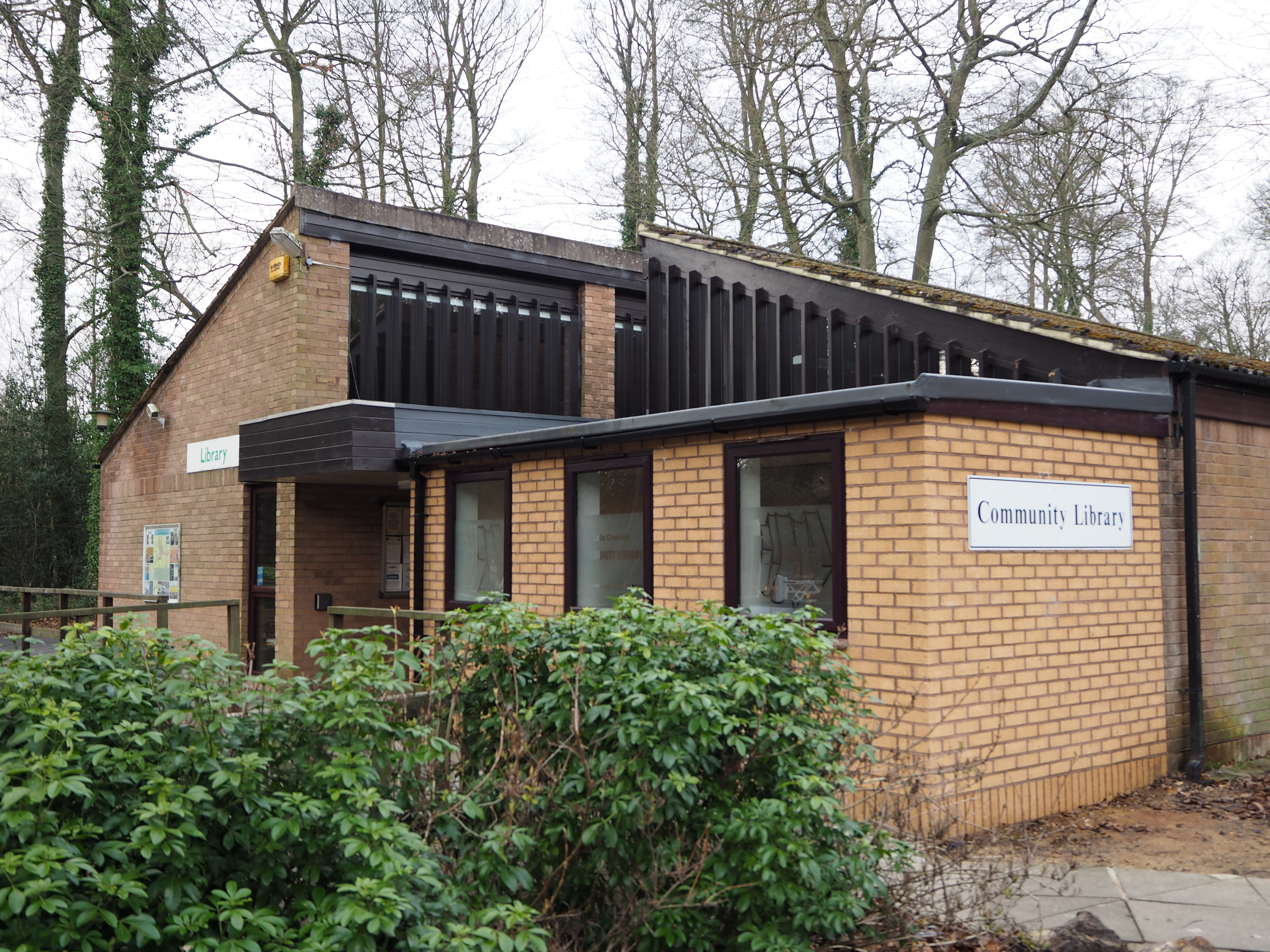
The Library showing the new computer suite

Little Chalfont Community Library was originally part of the Buckinghamshire County Library Service but, since 2007, is run as a community library by local volunteers. It is one of the most successful community libraries in England.

== Community ==
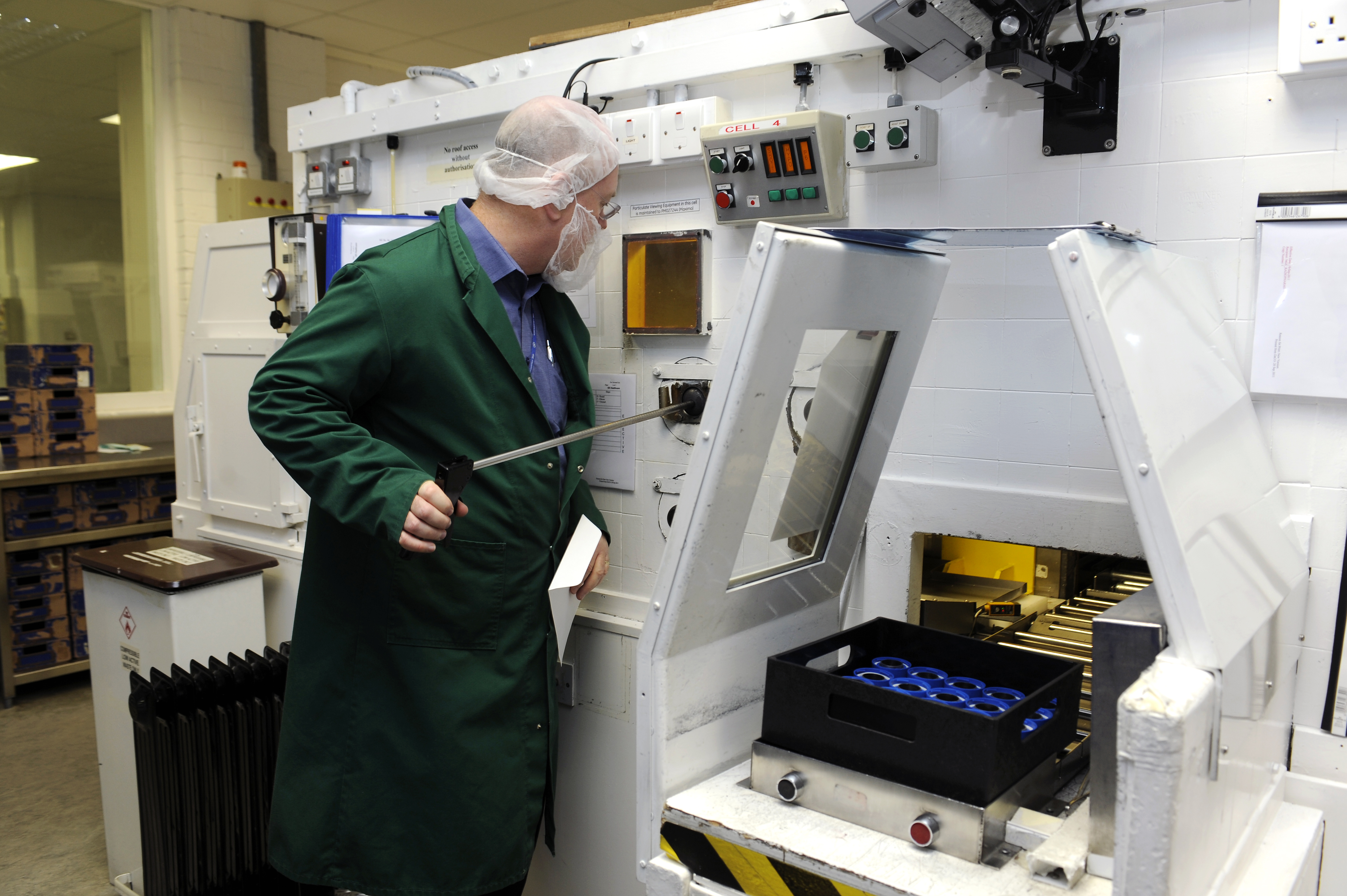
Packaging radioactive pharmaceuticals at GE Healthcare's facility.

Little Chalfont Farmers Market was launched in September 2009 with the support of the Parish Council and local regeneration groups. The Farmers Market takes place in the Village Hall car park on the second Saturday of each month.

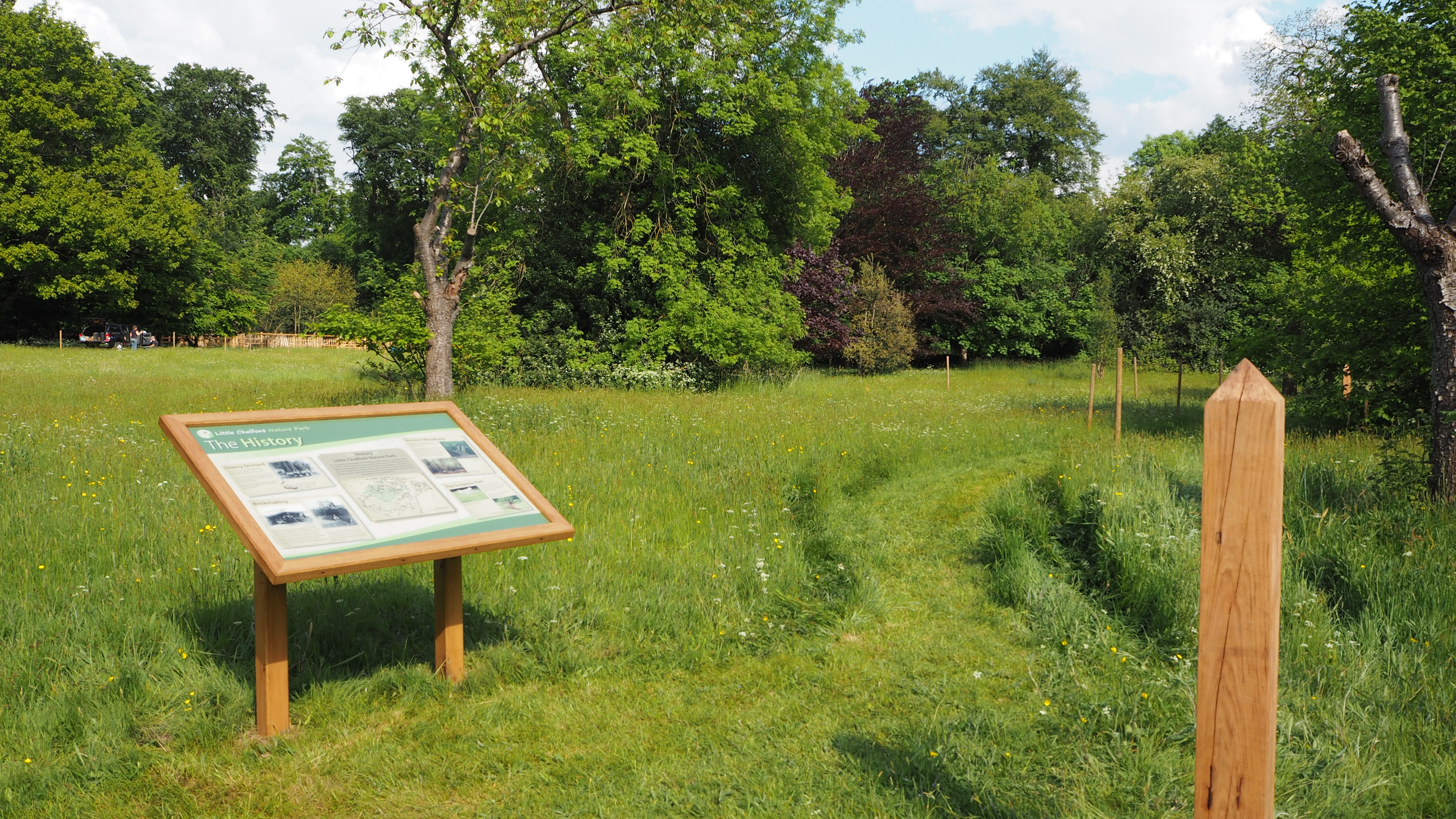
Little Chalfont Nature Park

Little Chalfont Nature Park is a 4.6 acre Nature Park with rare MG5 grassland / wildflower meadow and semi-natural woodland. It was purchased for and by the community and opened on 1 June 2016. It is freely open to visitors all year round from dawn until dusk.

Little Chalfont Community Association is active and organises the Annual Village Day.

== Landmarks ==
Beel House is a 10,194 square feet (947.1 m^{2}) Grade II listed 16th-century house on the edge of Little Chalfont. Originally owned by the Duke of Buckingham. It was the home of Mary Penington whose daughter Gulielma Springett married William Penn, founder of Pennsylvania. Later residents include Dirk Bogarde, Ozzy and Sharon Osbourne, and Robert Kilroy-Silk.

== Religion ==
Little Chalfont is part of the Church of England parish of Chenies and Little Chalfont. In 1987, it joined with the neighbouring parishes of Latimer and Flaunden to form the Chenies Benefice. The parish church of St George's is on White Lion Road.

St Aidan's Roman Catholic church is on Finch Lane. It was opened in 1964, having been built on land bought from the Beel House estate.

Little Chalfont Methodist Church is on Chalfont Avenue. The original church building was opened in 1959. After the church was damaged by fire in 1993, the current church building was opened in 1996.

== Economy ==
Little Chalfont is home to two industrial laboratories and an office development, part of GE Healthcare, originally the Radiochemical Centre, and then Amersham International. Recently, the Amersham Place building housing GE Healthcare , was acquired by Danaher Corporation and rebranded to Cytiva.
