= Took My Love =

1993 single by Bizarre Inc

Single by Bizarre Inc featuring Angie Brown

from the album Energique
- Released: 15 February 1993
- Studio: Comforts Place (London, England)
- Length: 4:32 (album version); 5:15 (Original Flavour mix)
- Label: Vinyl Solution
- Songwriters: Andy Meecham; Dean Meredith; Carl Turner; Angie Brown; Alan Scott
- Producers: Alan Scott; Bizarre Inc

Bizarre Inc singles chronology
| "I'm Gonna Get You" (1992) | "Took My Love" (1993) | "Love in Motion" (1993) |

Angie Brown singles chronology
| "I'm Gonna Get You" (1992) | "Took My Love" (1993) | "Rockin' for Myself" (1993) |

Music video
- "Took My Love" on YouTube

"Took My Love" is a song by English electronic music group Bizarre Inc, featuring guest lead vocals by English singer Angie Brown. It was released in February 1993 by Vinyl Solution and Sony as the third single from the group's second studio album, Energique (1992). The single reached number 19 on the UK Singles Chart and topped the US Billboard Dance Club Play chart for two weeks, as well as Canada's RPM Dance chart for six weeks.

== Critical reception ==
Ned Raggett from AllMusic stated that singer Angie Brown "does another good vocal turn on the ["I'm Gonna Get You"] similarly-arranged" song. In his weekly UK chart commentary, James Masterton wrote, "The decision of the techno duo to get themselves a guest vocalist with a real voice reaped obvious dividends when "I'm Gonna Get You" hit No.3 back in October. The new single is basically more of the same, following a proper song structure but still a track to storm the clubs and the airwaves. Watch this go Top Ten." Sam Wood from Philadelphia Inquirer viewed it as an "attempt at more conventional dance pop", and concluded, "They're intended for pop radio airplay, not the rave dance floors where lyrics tend to snap dancers out of their hard-won trances."

== Charts ==
=== Weekly charts ===
| Chart (1993) | Peak position |
|---|---|
| Australia (ARIA) | 190 |
| Canada Dance/Urban (RPM) | 1 |
| Europe (Eurochart Hot 100) | 71 |
| Europe (European Dance Radio) | 3 |
| Ireland (IRMA) | 17 |
| Netherlands (Dutch Top 40) | 22 |
| Netherlands (Single Top 100) | 22 |
| UK Singles (Official Charts) | 19 |
| UK Airplay (Music Week) | 14 |
| UK Dance (Music Week) | 2 |
| UK Club Chart (Music Week) | 26 |
| US Dance Club Play (Billboard) | 1 |
| US Maxi-Singles Sales (Billboard) | 15 |

=== Year-end charts ===
| Chart (1993) | Position |
|---|---|
| Canada Dance/Urban (RPM) | 3 |
| US Dance Club Play (Billboard) | 13 |

== Release history ==
| Region | Date | Format(s) | Label(s) | Ref. |
|---|---|---|---|---|
| United Kingdom | 15 February 1993 | 7-inch vinyl; 12-inch vinyl; CD; cassette | Vinyl Solution | |
| Australia | 5 April 1993 | CD; cassette | Possum | |

== See also ==
- List of number-one dance singles of 1993 (U.S.)
- List of number-one dance singles of 1993 (Canada)
