= Love's Gonna Get You =

Love's Gonna Get You may refer to:

- "Love's Gonna Get You" (Freeez song), 1983
- "Love's Gonna Get You" (Jocelyn Brown song), 1985
- Love Is Gonna Get You (song), a 2004 song by Macy Gray
- Love Is Gonna Get You (album), a 1972 album by Ben E. King, or the title song
- Love's Gonna Get Ya!, a 1986 album by Ricky Skaggs
- Love Is Gonna Get You (album), a 2007 album by Ben E. King
- Love Is Gonna Getcha, a 1990 album by Patti Austin
