= Love's Gonna Get You (Jocelyn Brown song) =

Single by Jocelyn Brown

from the album One From The Heart (1987)
- Released: 1985
- Recorded: 1985
- Studio: Hit Factory
- Genre: Post-disco
- Length: 4:03
- Label: Warner Bros
- Songwriter: Tony C.
- Producer: John "Jellybean" Benitez

Jocelyn Brown singles chronology
"So In Love" (1985)	"Love's Gonna Get You" (1985)	"Your Love" (1986)

"Love's Gonna Get You" is a 1985 dance single by Jocelyn Brown, a singer who had sung with the groups Salsoul Orchestra and Inner Life. The single was the first of four that Brown took to number one on the US dance chart. It also reached number thirty-eight on the R&B singles chart, and was her second R&B top 40 hit as a solo artist.

== Samples ==
"Love's Gonna Get You" has been sampled in 80+ songs. It also interpolates a lyric from "Ain't No Mountain High Enough" by Inner Life, which Jocelyn was featured on.

One particular line in the song, "I've got the power!" became particularly prominent in the mainstream when it was sampled (without permission) by the hip hop/dance group, Snap! on their smash hit, "The Power".

In 1991, Moby sampled the "yeah" vocal of the song for his hit single "Go". Boogie Down Productions' Love's Gonna Get'cha (Material Love) sampled the vocals as well. Technotronic also used the "yeah" vocal on their 1991 song "Money Makes The World Go Round".

In addition, two lines from the song, "Why waste your time, you know you're gonna be mine" and "I'm gonna get you, baby (I'm gonna get you, yes I am)" were resung by UK soul singer Angie Brown to create the 1992 hit "I'm Gonna Get You" by Bizarre Inc, which was a number-one dance hit that year, and was frequently played on dance radio throughout the 1990s.
