= I've Been Around =

I've Been Around may refer to:

- I've Been Around (film), a 1935 American film
- I've Been Around (album), the 2006 release from Ben E. King
- I've Been Around (song), a song written and performed by Fats Domino
