= White Moon =

White Moon may refer to:

- Tsagaan Sar (literally "White Moon"), the Mongolian Lunar New Year
- "White Moon", a 2014 episode of Marco Polo (TV series)
- "White Moon", a song by Ben E. King from Love Is Gonna Get You (album)
- "White Moon", a song by White Stripes from the album Get Behind Me Satan
