= Love Is Gonna Get You =

Love Is Gonna Get You may refer to:

- Love Is Gonna Get You (song), a 2004 song by Macy Gray
- Love Is Gonna Get You (album), a 1972 album by Ben E. King, or the title song
