= The Cateran =

Scottish punk band

- Origin: Edinburgh, Scotland
- Genres: Punk, hardcore
- Years active: Mid-1980s–1991
- Labels: DDT, Vinyl Solution, Imaginary, What Goes On
- Past members: Sandy Macpherson; Cameron Fraser; Murdo MacLeod; Kai Davidson; Andy Milne

The Cateran, or simply Cateran, were a Scottish punk band active between the mid-1980s and 1991.

== History ==
The Cateran formed in Edinburgh in the mid-1980s, with a line-up comprising Inverness natives Sandy Macpherson (vocals), Cameron Fraser (guitar), Murdo MacLeod (guitar), Kai Davidson (bass guitar), and Andy Milne (drums). Davidson had played in several bands in the early 1980s, including Reasons For Emotion, which also featured Craig and Charlie Reid, who later found fame as The Proclaimers. They were initially influenced by US acts such as Hüsker Dü and the Dead Kennedys, and signed to the DDT label. The band's debut release was the 1986 mini-LP Little Circles, which they promoted by touring with The Proclaimers, for whom Davidson also acted as manager. The "Last Big Lie" 7" followed in 1987, after which Macpherson left the band and Fraser took over as lead vocalist.

The Cateran moved to Vinyl Solution for the second album, Bite Deeper in 1988, before moving on again to Imaginary Records later that year for The Black Album EP. The band's third and final album, Ache, was issued in 1989 on the What Goes On label, and the band supported Nirvana and Tad on their UK tour that year. This album was also distributed in France in 1989 by Black et Noir label (founded by Christophe Martin and Eric Sourice, drummer of the band Les Thugs), which incidentally was the label's first release (BN01). A further EP followed in 1990 before the band split in 1991, with MacLeod and Davidson forming a new band, Joyriders, who released two singles, both of which were named "Single of the Week" by the NME, before splitting up in the mid-1990s. A compilation album of the Joyriders recordings was issued in Japan in 2009.

Davidson later had a career as a social worker, and died on 13 June 2007, aged 44, after falling from a tower block. A fund was set up in his memory to support young musicians. The Proclaimers donated £20,000 to the fund in December 2007.

== Discography ==
=== Albums ===
- Little Circles (1986), DDT
- Bite Deeper (1988), Vinyl Solution
- Ache (1989), What Goes On (WGO30)

=== Singles, EPs ===
- "Last Big Lie" (1987), DDT
- The Black Album EP (1988), Imaginary
- Die Tomorrow EP (1990), What Goes On

=== Compilation appearances ===
- Time Between - A Tribute to the Byrds - "She Don't Care About Time" 1989 Imaginary Records
- A Pox Upon The Poll Tax - "Teach Yourself" 1989 Peasants' Revolt REVOLT1
