= Brain Filter =

Studio album by Eon (musician)
- Released: Oct 5, 1998
- Genre: Electronic

Eon (musician) chronology
Void Dweller (1992)	Brain Filter (1998)	Sum of Parts (2002)

Brain Filter is a 1998 studio album released by the rave artist Ian Loveday, better known as Eon.

== Track listing ==
No.	Title	Length
1.	"Intra Neutral Power"	8:23
2.	"Re-Struct"	6:28
3.	"Frozen"	4:32
4.	"Bio-Virtual"	4:46
5.	"Muta-Gen"	7:26
6.	"Poison Mind"	5:56
7.	"Fear=Protein"	5:25
8.	"Hydro-Sphere"	6:53
9.	"Re-Struct (Spies Remix)"	6:31
