= Playing with Knives =

Single by Bizarre Inc

from the album Energique
- A-side: "Playing with Knives" (Quadrant Mix)
- B-side: "Plutonic"
- Released: 1991; 1999 (remixes)
- Recorded: 1991 (Out of the Blue Studios, Manchester)
- Genre: House; breakbeat hardcore; rave; techno
- Length: 6:46 (Quadrant Mix); 3:22 (radio edit/video version); 3:19 (1999 version radio edit)
- Label: Vinyl Solution
- Songwriter(s): Andrew Meecham; Dean Meredith; Carl Turner
- Producer(s): Bizarre Inc

Bizarre Inc singles chronology
"Bizarre Theme" / "X-Static" (1991)	"Playing with Knives" (1991)	"I'm Gonna Get You" (1992)

Music video
- "Playing with Knives" on YouTube

"Playing with Knives" is a song by British electronic dance music group Bizarre Inc. It was their second single released through Vinyl Solution (their fourth single overall), as well as their second single to be written and produced as a trio. It is also the first single from their debut full-length album, Energique (1992). The song originally reached number 43 in the UK Singles Chart in March 1991. It was re-released later the same year and peaked at number four in the UK charts. In 1999, the song was released for a third time, charting at a peak of number 30.

== Critical reception ==
Ned Raggett from AllMusic found that the song "has a wonderful squelching lead hook, leading into the mid-song shift to vocals and piano effortlessly." Larry Flick from Billboard magazine noted that it "spills industrial/acid keyboard noises on top of a fast-paced house groove". He added, "Nice contrast comes via occasional disco strings and diva wailing. Totally wild." James Hamilton from Music Week complimented the track as a "frantic exciting rave". Mandi James from NME felt it showed "their scope, imagination and innate skill for pure pop songs". Another NME editor, James Brown, wrote, "Token Techno track for people who prefer twisting and rolling at the hips to lying between the sheets listening to Peel. And a fine sound it is too." Richie Blackmore from Record Mirror described it as a "furious piano-techno workout" that "is certainly at the cutting edge of current trends". Marc Andrews from Smash Hits commented, "Throbbing "basslines" laced with meaningless phrases and there you have it. But just try sitting still when it's played at your next tea dance."

== Impact and legacy ==
NME ranked "Playing with Knives" number 14 in their list of "Singles of the Year" in December 1991.

Clubbing magazine Mixmag ranked the song number 24 in its "100 Greatest Dance Singles Of All Time" list in 1996.

Same year, English DJ Tall Paul named it one of his Top 10 tracks, saying, "I don't know why this hasn't been reissued yet. I've seen so many bootlegs. It's just waiting to be brought out again."

Alexis Petridis, writing for The Guardian in 2020, ranked the Quadrant Mix of "Playing with Knives" at number 13 in his list of his 25 best early '90s breakbeat hardcore tracks.

Classic Pop ranked it number 39 in their list of the 40 top dance tracks from the 90's in February 2022.

== Sampling and covers versions ==
- "Playing with Knives" uses vocal samples from the 1990 house track "Shelter Me" by Circuit. Later in 1991, Circuit released a remix of "Shelter Me" known as the Retaliation Mix, which itself samples the acid bassline from "Playing with Knives".
- The American/British act Blue Pearl used the song as their basis for their 1991 single "(Can You) Feel the Passion," which went on to be a bigger hit in the United States, reaching number one on Billboard's Dance Club Songs chart in 1992. The group mentions "Playing with Knives" in the chorus.
- Parts of the song were sampled in the 1994 hit dance single "The Rhythm of the Night" by Corona.
- In 2006 Big Bass vs Michelle Narine remixed it as "What you do (Playing With Knives)"
- In 2014 the song's sample was used in the single "Got to Be Good" by Peter Gelderblom and Randy Colle.
- In 2015 a sample appeared in "Ruffnek" by FineArt.
- Elements of the song can be heard in the chorus hook of the Pet Shop Boys' 2016 single "The Pop Kids."
- The piano riffs was sampled in RatPack’s 2017 track “Got To Have Your Love.”
- English musician Shygirl sampled the song in her single "TASTY".

== Track listings ==
- 1991 release (STORM 25) – Playing with Knives

A1. "Playing with Knives" (Quadrant Mix)
B1. "Playing with Dub"
B2. "Strings"

- 1991 release (STORM 25R) – Playing with Knives (The Climax)

A1. "Playing with Knives" (The Climax)
B1. "Playing with Knives" (Love 91)
B2. "Playing with Knives" (Quadrant Radio Mix)

- 1991 re-release (STORM 38) – Playing with Knives / Plutonic

A. "Playing with Knives" (Quadrant Mix)
B. "Plutonic"

- 1999 re-release (VC01) – Playing with Knives

1. "Playing with Knives" (Radio Edit)
2. "Playing with Knives" (Tall Paul Mix)
3. "Playing with Knives" (Dillon and Dickins Mix)
4. "Playing with Knives" (Tarrentella Mix)
5. "Playing with Knives" (Al Scott Mix)

== Charts ==
=== Weekly charts ===
Chart (1991)	Peak position
UK Singles (OCC)	4
UK Dance (Music Week)	1
UK Indie (Music Week)	1
UK Club Chart (Record Mirror)	7

Chart (1999)	Peak position
UK Singles (OCC)	30
UK Dance (OCC)	1

=== Year-end charts ===
Chart (1991)	Position
UK Club Chart (Record Mirror)	47

Chart (1999)	Position
UK Club Chart (Music Week)	20
