= List of RPM number-one dance singles of 1993 =

These are the RPM magazine Dance number one hits of 1993.

== Chart history ==
| Issue date | Song | Artist | Reference(s) |
|---|---|---|---|
| January 16 | "Understand This Groove" | Sound Factory | |
| January 23 | "Rump Shaker" (featuring Teddy Riley | Wreckx-n-Effect | |
| January 30 | "It's Gonna Be a Lovely Day" | The S.O.U.L. S.Y.S.T.E.M. | |
| February 6 | "It's Gonna Be a Lovely Day" | The S.O.U.L. S.Y.S.T.E.M. | |
| February 13 | "I'm Gonna Get You" | Bizarre Inc | |
| February 20 | "Deeper and Deeper" | Madonna | |
| February 27 | "Run to You" | Rage | |
| March 6 | "It's Gonna Be a Lovely Day" | The S.O.U.L. S.Y.S.T.E.M. | |
| March 13 | "It's Gonna Be a Lovely Day" | The S.O.U.L. S.Y.S.T.E.M. | |
| March 20 | "I'm Gonna Get You" | Bizarre Inc | |
| March 27 | "Arranged Marriage" | Apache Indian | |
| April 3 | "Hip Hop Hooray" | Naughty by Nature | |
| April 10 | "I'm Every Woman | Whitney Houston | |
| April 17 | "I'm Every Woman | Whitney Houston | |
| April 24 | "Little Bird" | Annie Lennox | |
| May 1 | "Mr. Wendal" | Arrested Development | |
| May 8 | "Little Bird" | Annie Lennox | |
| May 15 | "Little Bird" | Annie Lennox | |
| May 22 | "Took My Love" | Bizarre Inc | |
| May 29 | "Took My Love" | Bizarre Inc | |
| June 5 | "Took My Love" | Bizarre Inc | |
| June 12 | "Took My Love" | Bizarre Inc | |
| June 19 | "Took My Love" | Bizarre Inc | |
| June 26 | "Took My Love" | Bizarre Inc | |
| July 3 | "More and More" | Captain Hollywood Project | |
| July 10 | "More and More" | Captain Hollywood Project | |
| July 17 | "More and More" | Captain Hollywood Project | |
| July 24 | "Oh Carolina" | Shaggy | |
| July 31 | "More and More" | Captain Hollywood Project | |
| August 7 | "Tribal Dance" | 2 Unlimited | |
| August 14 | "Tribal Dance" | 2 Unlimited | |
| August 21 | "Tribal Dance" | 2 Unlimited | |
| August 28 | "Mr. Vain" | Culture Beat | |
| September 4 | "Mr. Vain" | Culture Beat | |
| September 11 | "Mr. Vain" | Culture Beat | |
| September 18 | "Mr. Vain" | Culture Beat | |
| September 25 | "Mr. Vain" | Culture Beat | |
| October 2 | "Mr. Vain" | Culture Beat | |
| October 9 | "Mr. Vain" | Culture Beat | |
| October 16 | "Mr. Vain" | Culture Beat | |
| October 23 | "Mr. Vain" | Culture Beat | |
| October 30 | "Mr. Vain" | Culture Beat | |
| November 6 | "All That She Wants" | Ace of Base | |
| November 13 | "All That She Wants" | Ace of Base | |
| November 20 | "All That She Wants" | Ace of Base | |
| November 27 | "All That She Wants" | Ace of Base | |
| December 4 | "Dreams" | Gabrielle | |
| December 11 | "Dreams" | Gabrielle | |
| December 18 | "Dreams" | Gabrielle | |
| December 25 | "Dreams" | Gabrielle | |

== See also ==
- 1993 in Canadian music
- List of RPM number-one dance singles chart (Canada)
