= Before After =

Studio album by Heaven 17
- Released: 6 September 2005 (UK and US)
- Genre: Synth-pop
- Label: Ninthwave
- Producer: Heaven 17

Heaven 17 chronology
Bigger Than America (1996)	Before After (2005)	Naked as Advertised (2008)

Singles from Before After
- 1. "Hands Up to Heaven" Released: 20 May 2006; 2. "I'm Gonna Make You Fall in Love With Me" Released: 24 April 2007; 3. "Don't Fear the Reaper" Released: 29 October 2008

Before After is the seventh studio album by the English synth-pop band Heaven 17. It was originally released in September 2005, on the label Ninthwave, nine years after their previous album, Bigger Than America.

The album reached #6 on the Billboard Magazine Club Play Chart in April 2006. In September 2008, the band's cover of Blue Öyster Cult's "Don't Fear the Reaper" was featured on the American dark fantasy television series True Blood. A number of remixes of tracks from the album have appeared on online digital services such as iTunes and Amazon.com. It was the final album to feature founding member Ian Craig Marsh, who made the decision to retire from music in 2007.

== Background ==
When Heaven 17 released Bigger Than America in 1996, it was their first album of new material in eight years. The band intended to release a follow-up in quicker succession and began working on more dance-orientated material approximately a year or so after Bigger Than America. The band worked on a number of backing tracks and later provided their manager and other contacts in the music industry with CDs of twelve tracks they intended to develop further. However, the reception towards these proved to be "kind of lacklustre" and the band decided to discard the tracks and start from scratch. Although a couple of the original backing tracks were later salvaged for Before After, the band concentrated on writing new material. Once completed, a rough mix of the album was sent to various record companies in the effort to get a deal, but nothing came to fruition. After the album was given a proper mix, the band sought record company interest again. Although the band received a few offers, negotiations fell through and the band eventually decided to release Before After independently. The band had 100 limited edition copies pressed, which were due to be sold via their official website, but an agreement was then made with small, independent labels for the release of Before After in the UK, Europe and US.

== Critical reception ==
Professional ratings
Review scores
Source	Rating
AllMusic	4/5 stars

Upon its release, Fiona Mckinlay of musicOMH wrote: "If this comeback is Heaven 17's attempt at making synth-based music cool again, it's not going to work. Heaven 17 are musically so dated that it's hard not to chuckle. It's soulless old school dance music for robots and people too hammered to notice." Stephen Schnee of AllMusic described the album as "sound[ing] like Heaven 17 with a fresh outlook". He commented: "With these tracks, the band sounds rejuvenated without losing sight of where it came from. In essence, this is another classic H17 album that will sound just as good 20 years from now as Penthouse and Pavement or How Men Are do today."

== Track listing ==
All songs written and composed by Glenn Gregory, Ian Craig Marsh, and Martyn Ware.

1. "I'm Gonna Make You Fall in Love with Me" – 3:23
2. "Hands Up to Heaven" (Keith Lowndes, Glenn Gregory, Ian Craig Marsh, Martyn Ware) – 4:43
3. "The Way It Is" – 4:11
4. "Freedom from Love" – 4:12
5. "Don't Fear the Reaper" (Donald Roeser) – 4:39
6. "Into the Blue" – 4:10
7. "Deeper and Deeper" – 3:54
8. "What Would It Take" – 4:55
9. "Someone for Real" – 4:25
10. "Are You Ready?"* (Billie Godfrey, Gregory, Marsh, Ware) – 4:36

Track marked with an asterisk (*) does not appear on the US release, although it is mentioned in the booklet.

== Personnel ==
=== Heaven 17 ===
- Glenn Gregory – lead and background vocals; synthesizer
- Ian Craig Marsh – synthesizer; backing vocals
- Martyn Ware – synthesizer; backing vocals

=== Session vocalists ===
- Billie Godfrey – lead and background vocals
- Angie Brown – backing vocals
- Michael Wallace – backing vocals
