= Steve McKevitt =

British writer and academic (born 1966)

- Born: Steven Michael Andrew McKevitt; 29 December 1966 (age 59); Liverpool, England
- Occupations: Author, academic, entrepreneur, former musician in The Bollweevils (Indie Band)

Steve McKevitt is a British writer and academic. Born in Liverpool, McKevitt is a former entrepreneur who launched a number of successful companies and worked in the field of brand communications, a sector he has described as 'the persuasion industries'. He is visiting professor of brand communication at Leeds Beckett University.

McKevitt has written several books and commentated widely on the issues facing consumers and companies in a marketing-dominated age. He published his first book, City Slackers (Cyan Books), in 2006, following it with Why The World Is Full Of Useless Things (Cyan Books) in 2007. In "City Slackers" he lamented the quality of management within Britain's business community and explored the knock-on effects on the economy of what he has dubbed 'career success without achievement'.

Everything Now: Communication, Persuasion & Control: How Our Instant Society Is Shaping What We Think (Route, July 2012), a study of how, what McKevitt calls 'Everything Now culture' is changing the way we consume, interact with others, form opinions and make decisions. The Sun (20 July 2012) said "What could quite easily have become a tiresome rant, is generally optimistic and, at times, uplifting. Everything Now quietly, but firmly, invites you to take a fresh look around yourself".

McKevitt has contributed to several newspapers around the world, including The Guardian, The Observer, The Huffington Post and Daily Nation.

In 2013, McKevitt's book Project Sunshine: How Science Can Use The Sun to Fuel And Feed The World, was published in the UK by Icon Books. Written with Tony Ryan (scientist), Pro-Vice-Chancellor for Pure Science at Sheffield University, the book examines the issues of population growth, food and energy security and climate change and explores the possible scientific and economic solutions available to us. The New Scientist said Project Sunshine "is lucid, optimistic – and plans to save the world...This is stirring stuff and well told... shows the great promise of solar power"

In 2014, "The Solar Revolution: One World, One Solution: Providing the energy and food for 10 billion people" was published by Icon in the UK. On the same day, The Guardian published "The Solar Revolution: Why bottled sunshine is the fuel of the future" as part of its short book series 'Guardian Shorts'.

In September 2014, Game Paused published Every Day is Play in the UK and the USA. The book, a celebration of the cultural impact of video games, was written and edited by McKevitt.

In January 2015, Signs of Life in the USA: Readings on Popular Culture for Writers 8th Edition ed. Sonia Maasik and Jack Soloman was published by Macmillan Publishers in the USA. It includes two chapters from Everything Now.

McKevitt studied Politics at Sheffield University 1985–88. After working in the music industry, he joined video games publisher Gremlin Interactive, where he became Head of PR, later working for Infogrames, now known as Atari and then Europe's biggest publisher of video games. In 1999 he was one of four founders of dot-com start-up Zoo Digital Group.

He was a director of influential graphic design studio The Designers Republic from 2004 to 2009 and co-founder of the agency Golden. He has also worked as an adviser on the creative and digital industries, export trade and inward investment to regional and national UK Government.

McKevitt completed his PhD at University of Sheffield in 2017. A book based on his research entitled "The Persuasion Industries: The Making of Modern Britain" was published by Oxford University Press on 16 August 2018. BBC Newsnight presenter and journalist Evan Davis described it as "A fantastically thorough history of a period of remarkable change in a fascinating industry."

== Personal life ==
McKevitt was born in Liverpool.

He is a former member of The Bollweevils (Indie Band) in which he played the bass. The band signed to Vinyl Solution in 1989. Their first record, Talk To Me EP, was released on Vinyl Solution's Decoy label in 1990. Two further EPs and an album followed – "Life's A Scream" released in Japan on the Toy's Factory label in 1991 – but despite their early promise The Bollweevils split up in 1993. .

McKevitt now lives with his family in Sheffield, South Yorkshire. He is the father of FA Women's Premier League footballer and writer Niamh McKevitt.
