= I'm Gonna Get You (Bizarre Inc song) =

1992 single by Bizarre Inc

Single by Bizarre Inc featuring Angie Brown

from the album Energique
- Released: 21 September 1992
- Recorded: 1992
- Studio: Comforts Place (London, England)
- Genre: Diva house
- Length: 3:23 (Original Flavour mix edit); 5:18 (Original Flavour mix)
- Label: Vinyl Solution
- Songwriters: Andy Meecham; Dean Meredith; Carl Turner; Toni Colandreo
- Producers: Alan Scott; Bizarre Inc

Bizarre Inc singles chronology
"Playing with Knives" (1991)	"I'm Gonna Get You" (1992)	"Took My Love" (1993)

Angie Brown singles chronology
"I'm Gonna Get You" (1992)	"Took My Love" (1993)

Music video
- "I'm Gonna Get You" on YouTube

"I'm Gonna Get You" is a song by English electronic music group Bizarre Inc, featuring collaborative lead vocals by English singer Angie Brown. It was produced by the group with Alan Scott and released in September 1992 by Vinyl Solution as the second single from the group's second studio album, Energique (1992). The song contains lyrics from "Love's Gonna Get You" by Jocelyn Brown, and a sample from "Brass Disk" by Dupree.

"I'm Gonna Get You" proved to be a hit on the UK Singles Chart in October 1992, peaking at number three and later being certified silver by the British Phonographic Industry (BPI) for sales in excess of 200,000 copies, and it also reached the number-three position in the Netherlands in January 1993. The track failed to reach the top 40 on the US Billboard Hot 100 and Cash Box Top 100 but topped the Billboard Dance Club Play chart as well as the Canadian RPM Dance chart.

== Background and release ==
English singer and songwriter Angie Brown was singing in a club called Singers one night and was spotted by a talent scout. She said in a 2025 interview, "A talent scout came up to me afterwards and she said, 'Can you sing like Jocelyn Brown?' I said, 'Yeah, yeah, sure. I can sing like Jocelyn Brown.'" She was introduced to the boys from Bizarre Inc in a studio and they played the track for her with Jocelyn's vocal from "Love's Gonna Get You" from 1985. The group asked Angie to sing like Jocelyn, instead of using a very expensive sample from the original. She recorded her vocals and nailed it in about 20 minutes, but didn't expect the song to perform so well from a commercial perspective. At the time, house music was a new territory to her, and Brown didn't understand why they wanted to do a mash up with the track, "I just thought, let me get the money and run."

Three months later people started calling her, telling her that she was in the charts and that she would be performing on the Top of the Pops. The song had debuted on number 17 on the UK Singles Chart on 11 October 1992 and would become a massive hit.

== Critical reception ==
Ned Raggett of AllMusic complimented the song a "noted smash, with great diva vocals from Angie Brown (one of her earliest star turns) and a simple but still sweeping string section reminiscent of disco's orchestrations at their best". Larry Flick from Billboard magazine wrote, "Fabrication of Jocelyn Brown's dance nugget 'Love's Gonna Get You' is steeped in rave sensibilities without sacrificing commercial appeal. Added potential comes via Angie Brown, who gives the U.K. act a marketable face. Maddeningly catchy chorus will likely spark a successful foray into the top 40." Marisa Fox from Entertainment Weekly noted that the trio "layers bass-heavy rhythms under warm disco choruses, making butt-burning dance music, not teen-bleep techno." She concluded that "Giorgio Moroder would surely be proud." Richard Smith from Melody Maker praised the song as "an absolute masterpiece of compression, saying everything it needs to say in just three-much repeated lines and it's still so sexy you half expect bodily fluids to start oozing out of the hole in the middle of the record."

James Hamilton from Music Week's RM Dance Update found that the Stafford based trio "go back to the classic 1979/81 disco sound for this soulful [track]". Mandi James from NME wrote, "Bizarre Inc have hit the jackpot yet again with the schoolgirl crush of 'I'm Gonna Get You'. Camp as you like, 'I'm Gonna Get You' tickles and teases with flirtatious vocals proving that Bizarre Inc are at their very best when they follow their gut instincts and head blatantly for the mainstream rather than darting around on the underground." Rupert Howe from Select stated that "the evergreen sound of the New York underground has captured the Bizarre imagination. The raw, fingers-down-a-blackboard racket of ravecore has been replaced by the finger-snapping swing of NY giant Todd Terry with new tracks like the garage style 'I'm Gonna Get You'." Josh Baines from Vice complimented the song as "great".

== Chart performance ==
"I'm Gonna Get You" peaked at number one on both the RPM Dance chart in Canada and the Billboard Dance Club Play chart in the United States. In Europe, it entered the top 10 in the Netherlands and the United Kingdom. In the latter country, the single peaked at number three during its fourth week on the UK Singles Chart, on 18 October 1992. Additionally, the song was a top 20-hit in Belgium and Ireland, as well as on the Eurochart Hot 100, where it peaked at number 19. On the European Dance Radio Chart, it reached number seven. In North America, "I'm Gonna Get You" peaked at numbers 47 and 46 on the US Billboard Hot 100 and Cash Box Top 100 charts, respectively. In West Asia, it became a top-20 hit in Israel, peaking at number 12 on 3 November 1992. In Australia, the song reached only number 127. "I'm Gonna Get You" was awarded with a silver record in the UK, after 200,000 singles were sold there.

== Live performances ==
=== Top of the Pops and The Voice UK ===
"I'm Gonna Get You" was performed on Top of the Pops in 1992. In 2014, Brown sung the song in an audition for The Voice UK. Though it brought many audience members to their feet, none of the judges turned around even though will.i.am noted that the song had inspired part of the Black Eyed Peas track "Boom Boom Pow". He said it was "one of [his] favourite songs and [he] never thought [he] would get to meet the person who sung it". He elaborated:

Why is that important to me? Because we were recording "Boom Boom Pow" and we were coming up with a bridge part and I was like "Fergie, have you heard this song? You have to do it like this!" I played your song for the power on that section. I never thought I was going to meet you one day.

The fact that Brown had not been selected made the audience and TV viewers furious, with one viewer branding it a "disgrace".

Britney Spears also performed a cover version of the song during her time on the Mickey Mouse Club.

== Music video ==
A music video was produced to promote the single. Angie Brown said in an interview, "If you look at the video, I'm sort of behind the feeds and stuff, but I'm in it, I'm in it. There's loads of dancers and I guess if I was the record company, I would do that. I wouldn't want to give Angie Brown too much, you know, because it's not the Angie Brown show. There was a girl roller skating, there were DJs, and the boys from Bizarre Inc. I think, were clicking away." "I'm Gonna Get You" was later made available on YouTube in 2013 and had generated almost 8.5 million views as of October 2025.

== Impact and legacy ==
Peter Paphides and Simon Price from Melody Maker wrote in 1994, that merging of Italo and garage had resulted in "a million fantastic, brutally poppy house tracks with loads of sampled screaming divas", like "I'm Gonna Get You".

Pitchfork included "I'm Gonna Get You" in their list of "Ten Actually Good 90s Jock Jams" in 2010. Porcys listed the song at number 75 in their ranking of "100 Singles 1990-1999" in 2012, adding, "Well, why do I think it's such a good job? Firstly, the level of energy produced for over five minutes does not settle down even for a second. Secondly, samples straight from Joselyn Brown are used in a thoughtful and extremely catchy way. Thirdly, Angie Brown's vocals cause chills around the third cervical vertebra. It is more than a confession, it is a musical expression of female stubbornness and an offer that cannot be rejected."

Fact put "I'm Gonna Get You" at number-one in their list of "21 Diva-House Belters That Still Sound Incredible" in 2014. BuzzFeed listed the song at number 20 in their list of "The 101 Greatest Dance Songs of the '90s" in 2017. Mixmag ranked it as one of the 30 best songs in their "The 30 Best Vocal House Anthems Ever" list in 2018, noting, "With its call and response lyrics, electrifying piano line and shining rave sensibilities, this one's still a certified banger! It hits like a shot of liquid serotonin in the dance, with the assertive tone of Brown’s vocals grabbing dancefloors by the scruff of the neck and thrusting them into overdrive." And in 2019, "I'm Gonna Get You" was included in their ranking of "The 20 Best Diva House Tracks".

== Track listing ==
7-inch single, The Netherlands (1992)
No.	Title	Length
1.	"I'm Gonna Get You" (Original Flavour Mix (Edit)	3:19
2.	"I'm Gonna Get You" (Tee's Freeze Mix (Edit)	4:10

12-inch single, Europe (1992)
No.	Title	Length
1.	"I'm Gonna Get You" (Original Flavour Mix)	5:18
2.	"I'm Gonna Get You" (Todd's Rubber Dub)	5:22
3.	"I'm Gonna Get You" (Sure Is Pure Remix)	6:40
4.	"I'm Gonna Get You" (Sure Is Pure Golden Dub Edit)	3:19

CD single, UK (1992)
No.	Title	Length
1.	"I'm Gonna Get You" (Original Flavour Mix) (Radio Edit)	3:22
2.	"I'm Gonna Get You" (Original Flavour Mix)	5:19
3.	"I'm Gonna Get You" (Todd's Rubber Dub)	5:24
4.	"I'm Gonna Get You" (Tee's Freeze Mix) (Edit)	4:12
5.	"I'm Gonna Get You" (Sure Is Pure Remix)	8:41
6.	"I'm Gonna Get You" (Sure Is Pure Golden Dub)	8:09
7.	"I'm Gonna Get You" (Tee's Beats)	4:46

CD maxi, Germany (1992)
No.	Title	Length
1.	"I'm Gonna Get You" (Original Flavour Mix)	5:18
2.	"I'm Gonna Get You" (Todd's Rubber Dub)	5:22
3.	"I'm Gonna Get You" (Sure Is Pure Remix)	6:40
4.	"I'm Gonna Get You" (Sure Is Pure Golden Dub Edit)	3:19

== Charts ==
=== Weekly charts ===
Chart (1992–1993)	Peak position
Australia (ARIA)	127
Belgium (Ultratop 50 Flanders)	14
Canada Dance/Urban (RPM)	1
Europe (Eurochart Hot 100)	19
Europe (European Dance Radio)	7
Ireland (IRMA)	17
Israel (Israeli Singles Chart)	12
Netherlands (Dutch Top 40)	3
Netherlands (Single Top 100)	3
UK Singles (Official Charts)	3
UK Airplay (Music Week)	11
UK Dance (Music Week)	1
UK Club Chart (Music Week)	10
UK Indie (Music Week)	1
US Billboard Hot 100	47
US Dance Club Play (Billboard)	1
US Maxi-Singles Sales (Billboard)	8
US Top 40/Mainstream (Billboard)	33
US Top 40/Rhythm-Crossover (Billboard)	23
US Cash Box Top 100	46

=== Year-end charts ===
Chart (1992)	Position
UK Singles (OCC)	29
UK Airplay (Music Week)	54
UK Club Chart (Music Week)	75

Chart (1993)	Position
Canada Dance/Urban (RPM)	7
Netherlands (Dutch Top 40)	83
Netherlands (Single Top 100)	44
US Dance Club Play (Billboard)	2

== Certifications ==
Region	Certification	Certified units/sales
United Kingdom (BPI)	Silver	200,000^{^}
^{^} Shipments figures based on certification alone.

== Release history ==
Region	Date	Format(s)	Label(s)	Ref(s).
United Kingdom	21 September 1992	7-inch vinyl; 12-inch vinyl	Vinyl Solution	
Australia	16 November 1992	12-inch vinyl; CD; cassette	Possum	

== Dave Audé version ==
Dave Audé interpolated the song in 2015, writing and adding new verses. With vocals by the Pussycat Dolls member Jessica Sutta, Audé's version charted at number one on the Billboard Dance Club Songs chart.

== See also ==
- List of number-one dance singles of 1993 (U.S.)
- List of number-one dance singles of 1993 (Canada)
- List of number-one dance singles of 2015 (U.S.)
