= BFORD 9 =

Studio album by Baby Ford
- Released: 18 May 1992
- Genre: House; techno; acid house; minimal techno
- Length: 77:29
- Label: Insumision; Sire
- Producer: Baby Ford; Richard Salt; eON

Baby Ford chronology
"Ooo" The World of Baby Ford (1990)	BFORD 9 (1992)	Headphoneasy Rider (1997)

Singles from BFORD 9
- 1. "In Your Blood" Released: 1991; 2. "Fetish" Released: 1992

BFORD 9 is the third studio album by English house producer Baby Ford, released in 1992 by Insumision Records in the United Kingdom and by Sire Records in the United States. Ford co-produced the album with Richard Salt. Dispirited by hardcore music and the contemporary house scene, Ford decided to create an album that explored moods and emotions, while combining elements of his acid house work. The resulting album is eclectic and explores styles of techno, funk and disco, as well as featuring Ford's soft vocals.

The record features the singles "In Your Blood", "Fetish", (a collaboration with fellow early 1990s dance producer eON) and "Move-On". Upon release, BFORD 9 received acclaim from contemporary music critics. Ford promoted the album with a series of gigs in the UK with eON, Colin Favor and Colin Dale. The album is known for inspiring Perlon Records co-founder Zip to create dance music.

== Background and production ==
Baby Ford (real name Peter Ford) began his career in the late 1980s where he was a founder of the British acid house movement, taking influence from Chicago house producers like Ron Trent, Larry Heard, and Marshall Jefferson and releasing material on the label Rhythm King. His 1988 single "Oochy Koochy" was one of the most prominently heard tracks in UK acid house, despite the producer being unknown. Nonetheless, as Ford rose in stature, interest in his music became less pronounced. Prior to BFORD 9, the producer released the albums Ford Trax in 1988 and 'Ooo' The World of Baby Ford in 1990, the former of which had become popular with many disc jockeys.

BFORD 9 was written and produced by Ford with co-production front Richard Salt. The record was mixed primarily by Ford and Salt at AML Studio 49, London, and later mastered at Townhouse. Ford was apprehensive before creating the album because he had been releasing much material he felt was "badly timed", explaining: "I don't know whether you can really be ahead of the times or behind them, but somehow if you're not in sync it's the kiss of death." He disliked the direction that house music was taking, feeling that the "commercial hardcore stuff" was "all nextnextnext!". Consequently, Ford became more interested in developing an anonymous presence.

== Composition ==
BFORD 9 is an eclectic, experimental house album, containing music that is aggressive, keyboard-driven and often instrumental in nature. Billboard consider the album to mark Ford's transition from acid house into techno and trance music, although writer Ted Kessler considers the record to revisit the acid house of Ford's debut album Ford Trax, interjecting the genre with techno and other styles such as disco and gospel, contributing to an overall aesthetic that "straddles the entire frame" of dance music and avoiding easy categorisation. Throughout the album, beats and synths are accompanied by sound and vocal effects in addition to hooks. Ford said of the album's genre: "It's not hardcore, That's all about those old breakbeats and +8 speeds. I'm into moods and feelings, and if there's anything in there it's the acid element that makes it different." Philip Sherburne of Pitchfork described BFORD 9 as "first-generation minimal techno."

"RU486", which opens the album with a stiff beat, reflects contemporary British electronic music in its incorporation of rumbles of bass and sirens and a treble melody line, along with a repeating hook. The album continues with the noisy "Fetish," co-produced with Ford's fellow early-1990s dance producer eOn. It features stuttered rhythmic loops and abridged vocal samples, contributing to a "stadium house" sound reminiscent of The KLF, whereas "Move - On" features Ford's vocals atop synthesised strings and a sped-up funk drum loop. "In Your Blood" is a sinister acid house track, featuring a more minimalist approach containing tinny percussion loops and synth squelches. The track was mixed by CJ Bolland. "Sashay Around the Sun" is reminiscent of electro funk, while "20 Park Driven" is a slow funk track, driven by organ and reminiscent of The Rolling Stones. The album finishes with numerous remixes and alternate takes.

== Release and reception ==
Professional ratings
Review scores
Source	Rating
AllMusic	3/5 stars
Select	5/5 stars

In the United Kingdom, BFORD 9 was released on 18 May 1992 by the label Insumision on CD and as a limited edition double LP. In the United States, it was released in June by Sire Records. To promote the album, "In Your Blood" and "Fetish" were released as singles, and in May and June, Baby Ford played live dates in the UK with eON, Colin Favor and Colin Dale. In a contemporary review, Ted Kessler of Select gave BFORD 9 a perfect score, saying "Ford successfully straddles the entire frame of dance, avoiding much of the categorisation that dogs current thinking in the techno world." He felt that Ford's frail voice, which he wrote was "part MC 900 Foot Jesus, part yearning adolescent alien," ensured that the album explored "a full spectrum of emotions". He concluded that "while the development of House is still in its infancy, Baby Ford is well ahead of the pack."

Colleague Andrew Harrison wrote that the album was the first to successfully combine disco, techno and "oblique atmospherics" under the "acid banner." He also described "Fetish" as a "white noise stomperama", calling it "easily the best Baby Ford record since 'Oochy Koochy'." Billboard felt that the album would "add a shot of musical integrity" to the rave movement, commenting how the "assaulting" music is "wisely" spiced with sound and vocal effects and hooks. In a retrospective review, Ned Raggett of AllMusic said that the album "had its moments of invigorating house/techno heaven given a fine combination of dirt and sheen." Nonetheless, he felt the album's opening tracks were its strongest, rendering it "another in the long line of dance albums that fails to maintain its strength over its length." He concluded that the album was "uneven but still interesting." Sean Cooper of AllMusic called "Fetish" a "classic cut."

BFORD 9 is known for inspiring future Ford collaborator and Perlon Records co-founder Zip (Thomas Franzmann) to leave his band Bigod 20 and start producing dance music. He discovered the album in a selection of promos given to the band by a Sire representative, and later told Pitchfork writer Philip Sherburne: "I got into electronic music pretty late, actually, but when I heard BFORD 9, that changed a lot for me-I think it was mainly the combination of the groove and soul with electronic music, because what we were doing was relatively cold and industrial. It touched me very, very deeply. So much so, actually, that I could not go on being the singer in this band."

== Track listing ==
All tracks written by Baby Ford.

1. "RU486" – 4:25
2. "Fetish" – 5:40
3. "Move - On" – 6:29
4. "In Your Blood" – 5:41
5. "Blow Back" – 4:15
6. "Sashay Around the Fuzzbox" – 5:05
7. "Intro (20, Park Drive)" – 0:49
8. "20, Park Drive" – 7:44
9. "Disconoddy" – 6:05
10. "Change" (Konrad Cadet Mix 1) – 5:51
11. "Move - On" (Alt) – 5:19
12. "Fetish" (9AX) – 5:26
13. "Noddy" – 6:53
14. "20, Park Drive" (Inst) – 7:40

== Personnel ==
- Baby Ford – writing, production, mixing (tracks 1, 2, 5–14)
- Richard Salt – co-production, programming, mixing (tracks 1, 5–14)
- Kevin Metcalfe – mastering
- Stephane Sednaoui – photography
- Mike Sale – artwork
- eON – mixing (track 2), co-production (track 2)
- Kurt Rogers – mixing (track 3)
- C. J. Bolland – mixing (track 4)
