= Energique =

Studio album by Bizarre Inc
- Released: 1992
- Recorded: 1991–92
- Studio: Maison Rouge, Out of the Blue Studios, Comforts Place, Blue Chip Studios
- Genre: Techno; breakbeat hardcore; diva house; house; disco
- Length: 55:44
- Label: Vinyl Solution; Sony
- Producer: Alan Scott; Bizarre Inc; Eon

Bizarre Inc chronology
Technologic (1989)	Energique (1992)	Surprise (1996)

Professional ratings
Review scores
Source	Rating
AllMusic	4/5 stars
Melody Maker	(favorable)
NME	7/10
Philadelphia Inquirer	3/4 stars

Energique is the second studio album by English electronic music group Bizarre Inc, released in 1992. It features singles such as "Playing with Knives", "Plutonic", "I'm Gonna Get You", "Took My Love" and "Love in Motion".

== Critical reception ==
Richard Smith from Melody Maker wrote, "Bizarre Inc have become one of the leading exponents of dragging the underground overground by making music that's as safe as house gets. But it still thrills. Putting the fun, though perhaps not the funk, back into the functional Energique is an often exhilarating exercise in expertise." Mandi James from NME said, "What Energique ultimately confirms is that Bizarre Inc are unsung heroes of a scene which has moved well and truly overground." Another editor, Ian McCann, complimented the album as "excellent", adding, "Here are the singles that filled floors and fields throughout 1991, plus a pile of newer tunes to match: 'Raise Me', X-Static', 'Playing with Knives', the mighty 'Plutonic' and current monster 'I'm Gonna Get You'. The quality is uniformly hight, the beats still rough despite the delay, and the vibes heavy. More than that you can't ask of a techno record." Sam Wood from Philadelphia Inquirer concluded, "Elegantly simple and simply elegant, Bizarre Inc might even move a stubborn late-boomer dance."

== Track listing ==
No.	Title	Length
1.	"Raise Me (Ascension Mix)"	4:42
2.	"X-Static (Adult Mix)"	4:52
3.	"Playing with Knives (Quadrant Mix)"	6:46
4.	"Plutonic"	6:22
5.	"Dangerous Women"	5:21
6.	"I'm Gonna Get You (Original Flavour Mix)"	5:20
7.	"Love Will Save the Day"	3:25
8.	"Took My Love"	4:32
9.	"Love in Motion"	4:27
10.	"Agroovin'"	4:12
11.	"Delicious Minds"	5:45
