= Designing Heaven =

Single by Heaven 17

from the album Bigger Than America
- Released: 15 August 1996 (Germany); 11 November 1996 (UK)
- Genre: Synth-pop
- Length: 4:12
- Label: WEA; Eye Of The Storm
- Songwriters: Glenn Gregory; Ian Craig Marsh; Martyn Ware
- Producer: British Electric Foundation

Heaven 17 singles chronology
"Penthouse and Pavement (Tommy D Remix)" (1993)	"Designing Heaven" (1996)	"We Blame Love" (1997)

"Designing Heaven" is a song by the British new wave and synth-pop band Heaven 17, initially released in Germany on 15 August 1996, followed by the UK on 11 November 1996, as the lead single from their sixth studio album, Bigger Than America (1996). It was written by band members Glenn Gregory, Ian Craig Marsh and Martyn Ware, and was produced by Marsh and Ware under their production company British Electric Foundation. The song peaked at number 128 in the UK Singles Chart. It was the band's first release of new material since 1988.

== Critical reception ==
Upon its release, Music & Media called "Designing Heaven" "a charmingly old-fashioned track" from the "seminal synthesizer pop pioneers" and noted that, although the song does not "deliver a strong hook", it "captures that classic 1980s pop glamour". The reviewer added that Giorgio Moroder's remix is "built around the bass sequence" he used on Donna Summer's 1975 track "Love to Love You Baby". Alan Jones, writing for Music Week, remarked that Heaven 17 "sound much as they did in their Virgin years, except that some bright spark recruited Giorgio Moroder and Motiv 8 to provide mixes". He continued, "The result, especially on the Motiv 8 mix, is a corny, slightly old fashioned but very commercial mix."

Larry Flick of Billboard magazine considered it "an engaging single that shows the act updating its sound to suit current electro-dance trends". Everett True of Melody Maker described the song as a "rather weak Human League pastiche". Neil Hannon, as a guest reviewer for the magazine, also noted it "sounds a bit like all those Human League comeback attempts" and found it "very dated [and] emasculated". He continued, "In the early days of the Eighties, Heaven 17 had a very specific sound. Now, there are all these crazy sampling sequencers, and they just sound like everything else."

In a review of Bigger Than America, Paul Fucito of AllMusic considered it to be "as contemporary as anything Erasure, the Pet Shop Boys, or The Human League have done recently". David Richards of the American magazine The Lexicon wrote, "Try to get by the first single, 'Designing Heaven'. Maybe one day it will be considered a classic like 'Let Me Go' or 'Penthouse and Pavement', but it's doubtful. The song lacks energy or a good melody, seemingly constructed without a real master plan. None of the remixes set the song on fire, but seem serviceable enough for clubs."

== Formats ==
- 12-inch single
1. "Designing Heaven (Starck Mix)" - 8:33
2. "Designing Heaven (Le Courbosier Mix)" - 4:43
3. "Designing Heaven (Rodgers Mix)" - 7:00
4. "Designing Heaven (Mies Van Der Rohe Mix)" - 5:43
- 12-inch single (promo)
1. "Designing Heaven (Hysterix Pure Pumpin' Mix)" - 6:55
2. "Designing Heaven (Moroder's Subterranean Mix)" - 5:45
- 2x 12-inch single (German promo)
1. "Designing Heaven (Motiv-8's Vocal 12")" - 7:05
2. "Designing Heaven (Gregorio's 12" [Varispeed 130BPM])" - 6:07
3. "Designing Heaven (Moroder's Extended Mix)" - 6:45
4. "Designing Heaven (Motiv-8's Vocal Dub)" - 4:42
5. "Designing Heaven (Gregorio's 12")" - 6:23
6. "Designing Heaven (Moroder's Subterranean Mix)" - 5:45
7. "Designing Heaven (Trans European Heaven Mix)" - 4:50
8. "Designing Heaven (Motiv-8 Extended Instrumental)" - 7:25
9. "Designing Heaven (Motiv-8's Radio Edit)" - 3:54
- CD single #1
1. "Designing Heaven (Radio Mix)" - 4:12
2. "Designing Heaven (Lloyd-Wright Mix - Motiv 8's Radio Mix)" - 4:10
3. "Designing Heaven (Le Corbusier Mix - Motiv 8's Dub 12)" - 4:42
4. "Designing Heaven (Trans European Heaven)" - 4:52
5. "Designing Heaven (Den Hemmel Designen)" - 4:27
- CD single #2
1. "Designing Heaven (Meis Van Der Rohe Mix - Giorgio Moroder's Subterranean 12")" - 5:43
2. "Designing Heaven (Stark Mix - Gregorio's 12")" - 8:33
3. "Designing Heaven (Venturi Mix - Giorgio Moroder's Vocal 12")" - 6:46
4. "Designing Heaven (Rodgers Mix - James Reynold's Vocal 12")" - 7:00
- CD single (UK promo)
1. "Designing Heaven (Radio Edit)" - 4:10
- CD single (Germany promo)
1. "Designing Heaven (Pump Up Mix Edit)"

== Personnel ==
Heaven 17

- Glenn Gregory - vocals
- Martyn Ware - keyboards
- Ian Craig Marsh - keyboards

Additional personnel

- Chris Cox, Giorgio Moroder, Gregorio, Motiv 8, James Reynolds, Hysterix - remixes

== Charts ==
Chart (1996)	Peak position
UK Singles (OCC)	128
UK Pop Tip Club Chart (Record Mirror)	6
