= Void Dweller =

Studio album by Eon
- Released: 1992
- Recorded: 1989–1992
- Genres: Techno, dance music
- Label: Columbia

Eon chronology
Void Dweller (1992)	Brain Filter (1998)

Void Dweller is the first studio album by the British musician Eon, released in 1992. "Spice (Original Mix with Notes)" references the 1984 film Dune. Other tracks allude to mental health issues.

== Critical reception ==
Professional ratings
Review scores
Source	Rating
AllMusic	3/5 stars

The Baltimore Sun noted that "no matter what he does with the component sounds, the structure of Eon's compositions always adheres to the formal demands of techno, putting enough emphasis on the kinetic qualities of sound that even a tune as aurally adventurous as "Basket Case" never seems to lose its propulsive edge." Newsday labeled the album "sci-fi dance music". The New York Times stated: "If Void Dweller is successful as an album-length experience, it's because it is mood-Muzak, establishing a chilly, creepy atmosphere. This is techno as isolation chamber rather than party music."

== Track listing ==
No.	Title	Length
1.	"A Kind of Living (Green Icing Mix)"
2.	"Inner Mind (Deep Thought Edit)"
3.	"Spice (Original Mix with Notes)"
4.	"Final Warning (Raucous Dub Mix)"
5.	"Basket Case (White Coat Mix)"
6.	"Infernal Machine"
7.	"Fear: The Mindkiller (Altered Edit)"
8.	"Electromagnetic Waves"
9.	"Basket Case (Black Coat Mix)"
10.	"Infinity (LP Edit/Remaster)"
11.	"Dawn on a New World (Concept Mix)"
