= Rockin' for Myself =

Single by Motiv8
- B-side: "Remix"
- Released: 1993; 1994 (re-issue)
- Recorded: 1993
- Genre: Eurodance; hi-NRG; house; rave
- Length: 3:51
- Label: Nuff Respect Records; WEA
- Songwriters: D. Leoni; G. Bortolotti; M. Gray; M. Persona; S. Rodway
- Producer: Steve Rodway

Motiv8 singles chronology
"Mission" (1992)	"Rockin' for Myself" (1993)	"Break the Chain" (1995)

Music video
- "Rockin' for Myself" on YouTube

"Rockin' for Myself" is a song by British electronic dance music record producer Motiv8, aka Steve Rodway. Based around a vocal loop originally performed by Anne-Marie Smith on Italian dance act 49ers' 1992 single, "Move Your Feet", it was released in late 1993 by Nuff Respect Records and features vocals by British singer Angie Brown. This version reached number 67 on the UK Singles Chart. In the spring of 1994, it was re-mixed and re-released by WEA, peaking at number 18 on the UK Singles Chart and number one on the UK Dance Singles Chart. On the Eurochart Hot 100, the single reached number 63. Outside Europe, it was successful in Australia, peaking at number nine and being certified gold. The accompanying music video was directed by Marta Fracassetti.

== Background and release ==
Before going under the name Motiv8, Steve Rodway released mostly underground tracks under different names in the early 90's. One of these was an early version of "Rockin' for Myself", released by Nuff Respect Records. He thought it sounded much more commercial than the other and when the demand for underground techno began to fall off, he recorded a new version of the track, which would become a massive hit in clubs. Warner Records signed him and a new remix was released, reaching the Top 20 in the UK. From then, Rodway stuck with the name Motiv8. He told in an interview, that because of the song's success, Jarvis Cocker of Pulp approached him, asking for a remix of "Common People". The following success of that remix played a big part in establishing the name Motiv8, according to Rodway.

Australian singer-songwriter Gina G's song "Rhythm of My Life" from her 1997 album Fresh! uses the backing track for "Rockin' for Myself (Extended Main Mix)", one of Rodway's 1994 variations. Initial pressings of the CD single included this remix along with a shorter radio edit, but they were omitted from later pressings.

== Critical reception ==
Larry Flick from Billboard magazine wrote, "If rave/NRG is your dance flavor of choice, 'Rockin' for Myself' by Motiv8 is a must menu addition. Angie Brown, last heard fronting singles by Bizarre Inc., puts forth a respectable performance, while Steve Rodway crafts an instrumental picture that strobes with vibrant keyboard colors and racing beats. Paul Gotel steps in and gives the track a beefier bottom, while Stonebridge comes to the table with a recognizable disco-fried interpretation." Maria Jimenez from Music & Media stated, "Motiv8's happy, positivity track a la Urban Cookie Collective, 'Rockin' for Myself', is appealing in its warm Stonebridge Mix, the wide open Well Hung Parliament Adventure and the hi-pumpin' Ultimate Vocal Mix". Andy Beevers from Music Week gave it a score of four out of five, naming it a "irrepressible house tune". He noted that the re-issue "has been getting a positive club reaction. Worth watching." James Hamilton from the Record Mirror Dance Update described it as a "Angie Brown chanted simple pop raver" in his weekly dance column.

== Music video ==
A music video (using the "Ultimate Vocal Mix") was produced to promote the single, directed by Marta Fracassetti and produced by Trampolene Productions. It features dancer and singer Rhonda Marchen lip-syncing the song on a red sofa, that moves up and down. She wears a yellow sweater and beret and plays with a giant strawberry. Some scenes are upside down, making it look like Marchen dances on the ceiling. Different characters appears with her in the red-painted room, like a woman sunbathing on the floor, a bodybuilder-marionette, a man going back and forth and a woman reading a magazine.

== Track listing ==
- 12", UK (1993)
1. "Rockin' for Myself" (Slammin' Granite Mix)
2. "Rockin' for Myself" (Instrumental Mix)
3. "Rockin' for Myself" (Dubrock Mix)
4. "Rockin' for Myself" (Granite Dub Mix)
- 12", Germany (1994)
1. "Rockin' for Myself" (Ultimate Vocal Mix) – 5:38
2. "Rockin' for Myself" (Stonebridge Mix) – 7:18
3. "Rockin' for Myself" (Original Dubrock Mix) – 5:34
4. "Rockin' for Myself" (Paul Gotel Funked Out Mix) – 8:50
- CD single, UK (1993)
1. "Rockin' for Myself" (Radio Version) – 3:50
2. "Rockin' for Myself" (Slammin' Granite Mix) – 5:45
3. "Rockin' for Myself" (Dubrock Mix) – 5:35
4. "Rockin' for Myself" (Granite Instrumental) – 5:44
5. "Rockin' for Myself" (Granite Dub) – 5:44
6. "Rockin' for Myself" (Dubrock Instrumental) – 5:29
- 1st CD single, UK & Europe (1994)
1. "Rockin' for Myself" (Radio Edit) – 3:42
2. "Rockin' for Myself" (Original Radio Edit) – 3:50
3. "Rockin' for Myself" (Ultimate Vocal Mix) – 5:38
4. "Rockin' for Myself" (Original Dubrock Mix) - 5:35
5. "Rockin' for Myself" (Extended Main Mix) - 7:41
6. "Rockin' for Myself" (Paul Gotel Funked Out Mix) – 8:50
7. "Rockin' for Myself" (Happy Herbi Mix) – 5:35
8. "Rockin' for Myself" (Stonebridge Mix) – 7:16
- 2nd CD single, UK & Europe (1994)
1. "Rockin' for Myself" (Video Edit) – 3:51
2. "Rockin' for Myself" (Original Radio Edit) – 3:50
3. "Rockin' for Myself" (Ultimate Vocal Mix) – 5:38
4. "Rockin' for Myself" (Paul Gotel Funked Out Mix) – 8:50
5. "Rockin' for Myself" (Happy Herbi Mix) – 5:35
6. "Rockin' for Myself" (Stonebridge Mix) – 7:16

== Charts ==
=== Weekly charts ===
Chart (1993)	Peak position
UK Singles (OCC)	67
UK Dance (Music Week)	21
UK Club Chart (Music Week)	49

Chart (1994)	Peak position
Australia (ARIA)	9
Europe (Eurochart Hot 100)	63
Europe (European Dance Radio)	6
Ireland (IRMA)	28
Israel (Israeli Singles Chart)	22
Netherlands (Dutch Top 40 Tipparade)	3
Netherlands (Single Top 100)	42
Scotland (OCC)	27
UK Singles (OCC)	18
UK Dance (Music Week)	1
UK Club Chart (Music Week)	3

=== Year-end charts ===
Chart (1994)	Position
Australia (ARIA)	53
UK Club Chart (Music Week)	9

== Certification ==
Region	Certification	Certified units/sales
Australia (ARIA)	Gold	35,000^{^}
^{^} Shipments figures based on certification alone.
