= "Ooo" The World of Baby Ford =

Studio album by Baby Ford
- Released: 5 March 1990
- Genre: Acid house, disco
- Label: Rhythm King

Baby Ford chronology
Ford Trax (1989)	"Ooo" The World of Baby Ford (1990)	BFORD 9 (1992)

"Ooo" The World of Baby Ford is an album by the English musician Baby Ford, released on 5 March 1990. Ford supported the album with a UK tour. "Chikki Chikki Ahh Ahh", with its references to ectasy, was banned from some UK radio stations. "Beach Bump" was the first single released in the United States.

== Production ==
"Children of the Revolution" is a cover of the Mark Bolan song, on which Bolan's vocals are sampled. T-Rex was Ford's favorite band when he was growing up; he intended his version to be a paean to acid house and an announcement of his stylistic move from disco. Ford used a twelve-string guitar on "Milky Très". Claudia Fontaine contributed vocals to some of the tracks. "Poem for Wigan" and "Wigan" refer to the town located near Ford's childhood home.

== Critical reception ==
Professional ratings
Review scores
Source	Rating
AllMusic	3/5 stars
Calgary Herald	D
Entertainment Weekly	A−
The Knoxville News Sentinel	4.5/5 stars
The Virgin Encyclopedia of Dance Music	3/5 stars

The Calgary Herald dismissed the album as "disco music, complete with the thump-thump-thumps, the whistles, and some of the most inane lyrics this side of the Silver Convention." The St. Petersburg Times concluded that Baby Ford "tries to create the world's first new age/acid house record on his debut album, complete with chanted mantras and nature sounds... The 10 lame tracks ... have the potential to be amusing in a campy way, but Ford ignores the potential of lines like 'Be a beach ball' on 'Beach Bump' and slathers on synthesized whooshes, beeps and overdubs in the hope of being taking seriously."

The Observer said that the music ranges from "camp disco to the ambient new age sound." The Commercial Appeal praised Ford's "intricately devised, booming structures". The Knoxville News Sentinel called Ford "something of a vocal cross between George Michael and Boy George." The Times stated that the music "sits somewhere between Steve Reich's minimalism, American urban house tracks and tacky British pop."

In 2008, Jon Savage listed "A Place of Dreams & Magic" as one of ten "definitive" acid house songs.

== Track listing ==
No.	Title	Length
1.	"A Place of Dreams & Magic"
2.	"Children of the Revolution"
3.	"Milky Très/Chikki Chikki Ahh Ahh"
4.	"Poem for Wigan"
5.	"Wigan"
6.	"'Hi, Mr. Logan'"
7.	"Beach Bump"
8.	"Let's Talk It Over"
9.	"The World Is in Love"
10.	"Change Your Ways"
