= The Bollweevils (indie band) =

The Bollweevils were a British indie band formed in Sheffield, England, active between 1985 and 1993.

== History ==
Although first formed in 1985, The Bollweevils did not come together properly as a live act until 1988. The first full line-up included Sarah Griffiths (vocals), Mark Johnson (lead guitar), Steve McKevitt (bass guitar), Dave Lloyd (rhythm guitar) and Chris Coyle (drums).

From their first gig The Bollweevils received favourable reviews. However, it was not until late in 1989 that the band signed a recording contract with the independent record label, Vinyl Solution. In March 1990, their first single was released on the Decoy label, the self produced and critically well-received four track Talk To Me EP. ABC's Stephen Singleton agreed to help record the second single, but it was not finished until 1991 and neither the band nor the record company were happy with the results. The tracks were re-mixed in June with the punk/dance producer Alan Scott, but the Life's A Scream EP was never released in that form.

In August 1991, the band added a second guitarist, Mark Shaw formerly of Circus Circus Circus, and Pete Darnborough (from Leeds techno-goths MDMA) took over on drums. Another EP was recorded in September with Jim Beattie (ex-Primal Scream) as producer. "Mouth" was released in November. At the beginning of 1992 a final song, "Missing Out", was recorded for Vinyl Solution, but once again it was a single that was never released.

A Bollweevils compilation CD, Life's A Scream, was released in Japan in 1992, on the Toy's Factory label. It contained all the tracks from the first three recorded EPs.

The Bollweevils disbanded in 1993.

== Post break-up ==
- Johnson and Griffiths went on to form Bolster. Johnson now performs as/with Don't Sleep Dream. Griffiths is now a member of Duck.
- Shaw formed a band called Sweet Thing.
- Darnborough still works in the music industry.

== Discography ==
- Talk To Me, 12" EP, Decoy Records, DYS 7T, 1990 (included "Talk To Me" / "Hold me Up to the Light" / "All the Same" / "It Cheers Me Considerably")
- Life's A Scream, EP DYS22, 1991. Unreleased
- "Mouth", 7" and 12" single, Decoy Records, DYS 27 and DYT 27, 1991. (includes "Mouth" / "Restrained" / ("Carry On", 12 inch only) )
- Life's A Scream, CD, Toy's Factory, 88708, 1992.
