= Steve Rodway =

British music producer, songwriter, remixer and sound engineer

Steve Rodway (born in Cambridgeshire), also known under the alias Motiv 8 or Motiv8, is a British electronic dance music producer, songwriter, remixer and sound engineer.

While known for many remixes, including those produced for Erasure, Spice Girls, The Doobie Brothers, Robert Palmer, Saint Etienne, Pulp, Dubstar and Pet Shop Boys, as well as his own singles such as "Rockin' for Myself", "Break the Chain" and "Searching for the Golden Eye", his highest-profile work was composing and producing the song "Ooh Aah... Just a Little Bit" for Gina G. The song was the United Kingdom's entry in the Eurovision Song Contest 1996 and a subsequent UK number 1 and international hit.

== Biography ==
=== Motiv 8 ===
Rodway started his musical career as a vocalist and drummer before settling as a keyboardist for Billy Ocean. An early release, "Mission", was licensed by Go! Beat Records. Rodway then started independent record label 'Nuff Respect Records, in preparation for distributing another single, "Rockin' for Myself". While the success of these early singles was limited to club play, Rodway's subsequent contract with Warner Bros. Records and a re-release of "Rockin' for Myself" took the single to #18 (week of 7 May 1994) on the UK Singles Chart.

Afterwards, Rodway began his remixing career, with an early remix of "Listen to the Music" by The Doobie Brothers (peaking at #37 UK, only a week after "Rockin' for Myself" peaked) opening up further opportunities.

Rodway's distinctive style of crossover remixes soon became in demand and his talents came to the attention of Jarvis Cocker of the group Pulp. Cocker and bassist Steve Mackey personally met with Rodway requesting a complete overhaul of "Common People" in the Motiv8 style; the resulting classic remix went on to replace the original version on BBC Radio 1's playlist. Following the success of "Common People", Rodway remixed "Disco 2000".

More involved was a 1995 production for Saint Etienne called "He's on the Phone", created by Rodway through a considerable rework of the song "Accident" from the Saint Etienne and Étienne Daho collaboration EP Reserection and used as the new single included on the Too Young to Die singles compilation. Time stretching and pitch shifting of a vocal sample from the song were used to create a new melody on the final product.

In 1997, Rodway took on remixing "Addicted to Love" by Robert Palmer, the best known song he had worked on to date. For this remix he insisted on using multitracks from the original version rather than a recent re-recorded version.

Motiv 8 was also responsible for additional production work on the single mix of "A Red Letter Day" by Pet Shop Boys (see below).

=== Spice Girls ===
In 1995, Rodway was asked to remix "Wannabe" by the Spice Girls. At this stage little was known about the group other than they were a future priority for their record company Virgin Records. Because the original down tempo of "Wannabe" was too slow for club play, Rodway re-recorded the girls' vocals and produced a new faster version of the track aimed specifically at club and radio play. When "Wannabe" was eventually released in 1996 as the Spice Girls' debut single, it became a huge hit on club and radio play around the world helping to establish the girls' own brand of Girl Power.

=== Gina G ===
One of Rodway's other objectives was to work with new recording artists. In December 1995, he was introduced to Australian singer Gina G, who had come across Rodway through an early demo called "Just a Little Bit" produced by Simon Tauber. The demo was eventually developed into the song "Ooh Aah... Just a Little Bit". Rodway produced a brand new version which went on to be selected as the United Kingdom's entry in the Eurovision Song Contest 1996.

In conjunction with the May contest, "Ooh Aah..." was released as a single in March 1996, hitting #1 in the UK in May and receiving BPI Platinum certification; #12 on the Billboard Hot 100; and selling 2 million copies worldwide. It was performed six times on Top of the Pops from March to May, and yet again on the year-end episode. "Ooh Aah's" stateside success brought Rodway both a Grammy nomination and an ASCAP award.

=== Pet Shop Boys ===
Rodway provided additional production on Pet Shop Boys' 1997 hit "A Red Letter Day". The duo became admirers of the Motiv8 sound and Neil Tennant visited Rodway at work in his studio during the remix. Ironically after it was finished and delivered, Tennant insisted a synth line which Rodway had come up with on the Motiv8 version, should be used on the Pet Shop Boys' own main mix. After trying unsuccessfully to recreate Rodway's riff it eventually had to be sampled from the Motiv8 mix. Thus it appears on both the Pet Shop Boys' main version as well as the Motiv8 remix

=== Kylie Minogue ===
In 2000 Rodway began to experiment with changes to the Motiv8 sound. Although the vocals were still kept and the song preserved, he began using combinations of clean synth lines layered with deliberately distorted acoustic instruments to produce a more forceful rhythm. Parallel compression was then applied. The synthesizer riffs in "On A Night Like This" are good examples of his technique. This version together with the Motiv8 remix of Billie Piper's "Something Deep Inside" are regarded as clear departures from the previous Motiv8 style. Due to the popularity of the remix, a video of "On a Night Like This" was also dubbed from an edited version of the Motiv8 Nocturnal Vocal Mix.

== Music ==
Motiv 8 remixes have a reputation for being focused on songwriting and composition, generally keeping the full vocal track — an approach that Rodway attributes to coming from a background of songwriting, as opposed to DJing. Often all the backing tracks are discarded in favor of an entirely new set built from the vocals alone; one exception was "Addicted to Love", in which maintaining the "essence" of the song was a concern due to the iconic nature of the song. Musical characteristics of Motiv 8 remixes include arpeggios playing during verses, and loops overlaid on programmed drum samples.

== Discography ==
=== Albums ===
- Horizontal Hold (1983)

=== Singles ===
List of singles, with selected chart positions
Title	Year	Peak chart positions				Certification	Album
Title	Year	UK	AUS	US	US Dance	Certification	Album
"Don't Stop Trying" (as Rodway)	1982	—	—	83	41		Horizontal Hold
"Don't Knock It 'Til You Try It" (as Rodway)	1983	—	—	—	—		Horizontal Hold
"Keep On Walking"	1985	—	—	—	—		Non-album singles
"Mission"	1992	—	—	—	—		Non-album singles
"Rockin' for Myself" (featuring Angie Brown)	1993	18	9	—	—	ARIA: Gold	Non-album singles
"Break the Chain"	1995	31	43	—	—		Non-album singles
"Searching for the Golden Eye" (featuring Kym Mazelle)	1995	40	—	—	—		Non-album singles
"Riding on the Wings" (featuring Jocelyn Brown)	2005	44	—	—	—		Non-album singles

=== Selected remixes ===
- 1993 Shawn Christopher – "Make My Love"
- 1994 The Doobie Brothers – "Listen to the Music"
- 1994 Saint Etienne – "Hug My Soul"
- 1994 N-Trance – "Turn Up the Power"
- 1995 Pulp – "Common People"
- 1995 Pulp – "Disco 2000"
- 1995 Saint Etienne – "He's on the Phone"
- 1995 Let Loose - "Everybody Say Everybody Do"
- 1995 Mary Kiani– "When I Call Your Name"
- 1995 Kelly Llorenna - "Brighter Day"
- 1995 2 In A Room - "Giddy Up"
- 1995 Mary Kiani – "I Imagine"
- 1995 Childliner DJ's - "The Gift Of Christmas"
- 1995 Diana - "All I Need Is Love"
- 1995 Sleazesisters with Vikki Sheppard - "Sex"
- 1995 Teez - "Should Have Known Better"
- 1995 J-Pac - "Nutter"
- 1996 Gina G - "Ooh Aah... Just A Little Bit"
- 1996 Spice Girls – "Wannabe"
- 1996 Diana Ross – "I Will Survive"
- 1996 Dubstar – "Stars"
- 1996 Mary Kiani - "Let The Music Play"
- 1996 Mary Kiani - "100%"
- 1996 Crush - "Jellyhead"
- 1996 Neuronic - "Heaven"
- 1996 Open Arms - "Hey Mr DJ"
- 1996 Sparks - "Now That I Own the BBC"
- 1996 Heaven 17 – "Designing Heaven"
- 1996 West End - "It's Raining Men"
- 1996 Nightcrawlers - "Let's Push It"
- 1996 Johnna - "Pride"
- 1996 Dana Dawson - "Show Me"
- 1996 Sean Maguire - "Good Day"
- 1996 Michelle Gayle - "Baby Don't Go"
- 1996 Ann Consuelo - "See The Day"
- 1997 Nightcrawlers – "Lift Me Up"
- 1997 Robert Palmer – "Addicted to Love"
- 1997 Pet Shop Boys – "A Red Letter Day"
- 1997 Gala – "Let A Boy Cry"
- 1998 Alabama 3 – "Ain't Going to Goa"
- 1998 Blue Beat - "Big Times"
- 2000 Mero - "It Must Be Love"
- 2000 Buffalo G - "We're Really Saying Something"
- 2000 Scooch – "For Sure"
- 2000 Kaci – "Paradise"
- 2000 Billie Piper – "Something Deep Inside"
- 2000 Kylie Minogue – "On A Night Like This"
- 2000 Erasure – "Freedom"
- 2000 Precious – "New Beginning"
- 2000 A1 – "Same Old Brand New You"
- 2000 Kristine W – "Lovin' You"
- 2001 Dreamworld – "Movin' Up"
- 2001 KT Oslin – "Come On A My House"
- 2001 Brooklyn Bounce – "Bass, Beats & Melody"
- 2001 Kaci – "Tu Amor"
- 2001 Taylor Caine – "Bombshell Cabaret"
- 2001 LeAnn Rimes – "But I Do Love You"
- 2004 Phixx – "Strange Love"
- 2005 Carlos Adolfo Dominguez – "Boobies"
- 2005 Sun – "Without Love"
- 2005 Motiv8 – "Riding On The Wings"

=== Compilations ===
- 1999 Motiv8tion: The Official Motiv 8 Remix Collection, Volume 1
