= Bigger Than America =

Studio album by Heaven 17
- Released: 20 September 1996 (UK)
- Genre: Synth-pop
- Length: 54:42
- Label: Eye of the Storm; WEA
- Producer: B.E.F.

Heaven 17 chronology
| Higher and Higher: The Best of Heaven 17 (1993) | Bigger Than America (1996) | Before After (2005) |

Singles from Bigger Than America
- 1. "Designing Heaven" Released: 15 August 1996 (Germany) Released: 11 November 1996 (UK); 2. "We Blame Love" Released: 17 February 1997 (Germany) Released: 5 May 1997 (UK/Europe)

Bigger Than America is the sixth studio album by the English synth-pop band Heaven 17. It was originally released in September 1996, on the label Eye of the Storm, eight years after their previous studio album, Teddy Bear, Duke & Psycho (1988).

The album peaked at number one on Germany Alphabeat Redaktionscharts' Rock/Pop/Alternative Charts in November 1996, but did not chart in the UK. It was listed as number 6 on the online music magazine Addicted to Noise's Writers Poll.

In an interview with The Guardian in 2010, Ware recalled: "This went under the radar to the extent that hardly anybody in this country knew about it; we did do an album in '95 called Bigger Than America, which was our attempt to re-engage early analogue synths and create an album based on that. It just got lost in the big Warner Brothers machine."

== Critical reception ==
Professional ratings
Review scores
| Source | Rating |
|---|---|
| The Guardian | 2/5 stars |
| Select | 1/5 stars |

Upon its release, Caroline Sullivan of The Guardian commented: "Heaven 17 have hardly changed [and] things are much the same - just less melodic. Marsh and Ware still produce plinky, one-tempo backbeats, [and] Gregory's lyrics are disillusioned, even morose. "We Blame Love" has the closest thing to a tune, which brings us to the crux of the matter - their status as godfathers of techno is unchallenged, but these songs are hollow and too samey."

Robert Semrow of Keyboard wrote: "[Heaven 17] were outstanding before, and have only improved with time. Each song is solid and very dancefloor-friendly. Bigger Than America is similar to their previous sound, with pads and dance grooves providing a backdrop for Gregory's unmistakable strong vocals. Lots of movement, lots of changes, and lots to enjoy." Howard Cohen of Knight Ridder summarised: "Erasure-like Europop cuts 'Freak!' and 'Another Big Idea' are danceable enough, and there's a throbbing Giorgio Moroder dance remix. But this is largely tuneless, boring stuff. Which explains why few missed Heaven 17 in the first place."

== Track listing ==
1. "Dive" – 4:30
2. "Designing Heaven" – 5:15
3. "We Blame Love" – 4:49
4. "Another Big Idea" – 4:57
5. "Freak!" – 4:09
6. "Bigger Than America" – 4:00
7. "Unreal Everything" – 4:10
8. "The Big Dipper" – 4:57
9. "Do I Believe?" – 4:57
10. "Resurrection Man" – 4:06
11. "Maybe Forever" – 4:42
12. "An Electronic Prayer" – 4:06
13. "Designing Heaven – (Mies Van Der Rohe mix)" +
14. "Designing Heaven (Den Hemmel Designen) – (Gregorio remix)" +

Tracks marked with "+" are bonus tracks added to the other version of the CD album.

== Personnel ==
- Glenn Gregory
- Ian Craig Marsh
- Martyn Ware

== Production ==
- Ray Smith – cover art

== Charts ==
=== Weekly charts ===
Weekly chart performance for Bigger Than America
| Chart (1996/97) | Peak position |
|---|---|
| Australian Albums (ARIA) | 155 |
