= Baby Ford =

British musician

- Born: Peter Frank Adshead
- Occupations: Record producer, musician
- Known for: acid house music

Peter Frank Adshead, better known as Baby Ford, is a British electronic music record producer, known particularly for his contributions to the birth of acid house. He has also released material under aliases with Mark Broom (Casino Classix, El Mal, Solcyc, & Perbec), Thomas Melchior (Soul Capsule & Sunpeople), and Eon (Minimal Man).

== Career ==
Ford is influenced by Chicago musicians such as Marshall Jefferson, Ron Trent, Armando, and Larry Heard, and was one of the founders of the acid house scene in the United Kingdom. His early work was released on Rhythm King, including the club tracks "Oochy Koochy (F.U. Baby Yeah Yeah)" (a No. 58 UK Singles Chart hit seen as the first British acid house record), and "Chikki Chikki Ahh Ahh" (UK No. 54). These two first singles appeared on the 2x12" EP "Ford Trax" (BFORD3.)

Both appeared in remixed form on the EP, and the original singles were remixed on a variety of different formats (12" and CD) and energized the burgeoning UK acid-house scene. Sire Records in the US signed Baby Ford, as well as several other artists, on the Rhythm King label. Sire had been impressed with the label, but reportedly had concerns about how to effectively market Rhythm King artists in the US, as acid house had not broken into the US mainstream. The second album "Ooo" The World of Baby Ford contained three singles, the most popular of which was a cover of Marc Bolan & T. Rex's "Children of the Revolution" (a UK No. 53 hit in 1989). It was also a club hit across the globe, as was 1990's "Beach Bump" (UK No. 68). The US released the "Let's Talk It Over" EP in 1990, with exclusive live tracks. The tracks were recorded on Baby Ford's tour of the US, where he opened for Depeche Mode on several dates of their Violator tour.

The BFord9 album in 1992 revealed a different side of Ford's electronic influences. The release incorporated minimal techno with trance-like elements, long before these genres became popular later in the decade. CJ Bolland contributed a mix of "In Your Blood" on BFord9 and "Fetish" was a club hit in both the UK and the US. Several of the songs on BFord9 were re-released by Aphex Twin on his Re-Phlex label in the late 1990s in a remixed format on "Normal EP". Many of these remixes were recorded in 1992.

Baby Ford, Eon, and Mark Broom continued their explorations into minimal electronic music throughout the 1990s and well into the next decade through the iFach, Pal-SL and Trelik Record labels. iFach Vol. 1 contained the first five releases on the iFach label.

Releases appeared on Sire, Source, and Insumision/Transglobal. He co-managed the labels Trelik and iFach, and worked with Trelik's Ian Loveday. His remixing work includes tracks by Stefan Robbers and S'Express.

== Discography ==
=== Albums ===
- Ford Trax (Rhythm King, 1989, BFORD3)
- "Ooo" The World of Baby Ford (Rhythm King (UK), Sire (US), 1990, BFORD5)
- BFord9 (Transglobal (Rhythm King) (UK), Sire (US), 1992)
- Headphoneasyrider (Blackmarket Records, 1997, BFORD12)
- Sacred Machine (Klang Electronic, 2001)
- Basking in the Brakelights (EFA, 2003)
- Birds (Pal, 2007)

=== Singles and EPs ===
- "Oochy Koochy (F.U. Baby Yeah Yeah)" (Rhythm King 1988) (BFORD1) – UK No. 58
- "Chikki Chikki Ahh Ahh" (Rhythm King 1988) (BFORD2) – UK No. 54
- "Children of the Revolution" (Rhythm King 1989) (BFORD4) – UK No. 53
- "Beach Bump" (Rhythm King 1990) (BFORD6) – UK No. 68
- "Change" (Rhythm King 1990) (BFORD7)
- "In Your Blood" (Rhythm King 1992) (BFORD8)
- "Fetish" (Rhythm King 1992) (BFORD10) – UK No. 99
- "Move-On" (Sire US 1992) (US-only release)
- "Slow Hand" (PAL-SL 1) (BFORD11)
- "Tall Storey" / "Now and Then" (Source Records) (BFORD13)
- "Night D3 Died EP" (PAL-SL 4) (BFORD14)
- "Normal EP" (Rephlex 1999) (BFORD15)
