= Les Thugs =

Les Thugs were a punk band from France. Their records are distributed in North-America by Sub Pop Records.

== Biography ==
=== Early days and first issue ===
The founding members of Les Thugs were two brothers, Eric and Christophe Sourice, from Angers, France. The Sourice brothers were teenagers in 1977 and were influenced by the English punk wave that was sweeping through France. Without knowing how to play any instruments, the band used the DIY ethic. Their first band was founded in 1979, a group called IVG. They then played in the groups Dazibao and Stress with Gérald Chabaud, Thierry Méanard and a fifth member (Philippe Brix) as singer.

In April 1983, following the departure of the lead singer, they officially became Les Thugs. The band's name refers to the historical brotherhood of the Thuggee, followers of the goddess Kali, and not directly to the English loan word thug. Eric became the lead singer and the band quickly created its own repertoire, performing its first concerts in bars in Angers and surrounding towns. In July 1984, during a concert in Juvisy, near Paris, Les Thugs met the very young independent label Gougnaf Mouvement with whom they decided to release a 45 rpm single. Frenetic Dancing, the group's first record, was released in January 1985 by Gougnaf Mouvement. This single includes two tracks Night Dance and Femme Fatale. Both were recorded in a basement in Juvisy with an 8 track tape recorder. The success of the record was well beyond the expectations of the group: the single, although limited, was internationally distributed and sold more than 3,000 copies. Response to the record in specialized fanzines was good; the group got reviews in maximumrocknroll in the United States and in Sounds in England. One hundred copies were sold in Vinyl Solution, a shop and a label in London run by two French expatriates in England. Greg Shaw, a protagonist in the Californian underground scene, put the track Femme Fatale on the Bomp! Records compilation Battle of Garage.

=== European rise ===
Les Thugs then recorded their first mini-album, Radical Hystery. They were approached by many labels such as New Rose records in France and Midnight in United States. Eventually the band chose Closer, a French independent label which was more established than Gougnaf Mouvement. The album was released in 1986 and sales were good, with 3,000 copies sold in France and 2,000 abroad.

In 1987 the band left Closer to join the English label Vinyl Solution. The seven tracks on the mini-album Electric Troubles were recorded in London in July. On November 8, during their first tour of England, they participated in John Peel's Peel Sessions on BBC Radio 1.

The year 1988 was mostly occupied by touring throughout Europe. In June their bassist Gerald left the band. He was replaced by the group's roadie, Pierre-Yves Sourice, the younger brother of Eric and Christophe. At the start of the year they released the EP Dirty White Race in Europe, and on 11 October the French quartet played in Berlin at Independence days festival. This performance brought them to the attention of the Seattle-based label Sub Pop. Later, Jonathan Poneman, founder of the label recalled

"I remember back in 1988, Bruce Pavitt and I scammed a trip to Berlin with Mudhoney, who were scheduled to play the then state-funded, now defunct Berlin Independence Days music festival. As an unofficial representative of the insurgent American Rock Underground I was pleased to note that most of the European bands that were playing this extravaganza were godawful. Wondering just how horrible it could get, I decided to go check out a French rock band for laffs. Maybe they would play some Mink DeVille covers. The band was Les Thugs and they effortlessly blew my shit away."

This meeting resulted in the signing of the group to Sub Pop, who started to distribute the band's catalog in North America. During the summer of 1989 the group performed a two-month tour in North America in precarious conditions. They played in Seattle with PIL then toured with Blood Circus in the USA then with SNFU in Canada, and with Tad in Washington. It was during this time that they crossed paths with Jello Biafra.

In the autumn of 1989 they released their first full-length album Still Angry, Still Hungry in Europe. This album was recorded in Wales during May by Iain Burgess (Big Black) and then mixed in Chicago. Les Thugs toured in England with Mega City Four, and performed many dates in France, including supporting Noir Désir at the Olympia in Paris. During 1993 Still Hungry, Still Angry was made available by Sub Pop in North America under the title of 'Still Angry'.

=== Wider success ===
In 1991, in the midst of the Gulf War, the song Stop the War and the album IABF were issued in the US by Alternative Tentacles, Jello Biafra’s label. Recorded in England, IABF (International Anti-Boredom Front) contains one of the best known tunes of the group: I Love You So. A European tour accompanied the album's release in spring 1991, followed by a US tour of 33 dates in autumn. During this period, for the 10th anniversary of Alternative Tentacles and the hundredth issue of the Californian label, Les Thugs were invited by Jello Biafra to contribute to a tribute album for the Dead Kennedys, Virus 100, alongside Faith No More, Sepultura and L7. The band recorded a cover of the Dead Kennedys’ track Moon Over Marin at Smart Studios in Madison with Butch Vig (Nirvana, Sonic Youth, Garbage).

In 1993, they recorded the album As Happy As Possible in Seattle with Kurt Bloch (Fastbacks, The Young Fresh Fellows). The album was their best commercial success with 40,000 copies sold worldwide, including 15,000 in both the US and France.

On February 19, 1994, they were the support for Nirvana during their concert in Neuchâtel in Switzerland. It was one of the last Nirvana concerts before the death of Kurt Cobain. In May, the Thugs toured in major French theaters, such as (Le Zenith de Paris), opening for The Breeders.

In 1996, Sub Pop produced the album Strike, recorded by Steve Albini. In May the group performed its last US tour, opening for Therapy? and Girls Against Boys. Despite a good critical reception, the commercial impact of Strike was lower compared to the previous album and the band emerged disappointed by the collaboration with Steve Albini. After this, the group wanted to compose and record a new album as soon as possible.

=== Decline and separation ===
In 1997 they changed label again producing Nineteen Something themselves, which was licensed by Virgin in France and Sub Pop in the United States. The album was recorded in Angers with Kurt Bloch once again. The album showed the band moving towards a more melodic style of rock than the previous albums. For the first time, they sang in French on the track “Les lendemains qui chantent”. A tour of 60 dates in France and Switzerland followed the release of the album. It launched with an unpaid gig at Vitrolles stadium with Noir Désir in support of the association “Le sous-marin”, stripped of grants by the National Front (far right political party in France) municipality. Despite again receiving a good critical response and a good start on the American College Radio Charts, sales of Nineteen Something did not exceed 10,000 copies.

At this point Christophe Sourice decided to leave the band because of internal disagreements. Before ending this part of their career Les Thugs recorded their last album Tout doit disparaître, produced by Christophe Sourice himself. This album was only released on the French market, in 1999. They performed their last tour with 20 dates in France. The band, who had played more than 700 concerts, performed their farewell show at La Roche-sur-Yon in December 1999.

=== Brief reformation ===
In 2008, they played a show in Seattle for the 20th anniversary of the Sub Pop label, and for some dates in France. This small tour was ironically called the No-Reform Tour.

=== New band ===
In 2018, two members (Eric and Pierre-Yves Sourice) launched a new band called LANE (Love And Noise Experiment) with Pierre-Yves' son, Félix, and two members of another similar band, Daria, the brothers Etienne and Camille Belin. One album was issued in 2019 which gained critical acclaim, "A Shiny Day". "Pictures of A Century" followed in June 2020.

== Discography ==
=== Demos ===
- Femme Fatale demo – 1984
- Les Thugs demo – 1984
- Never Get Older With Les Thugs demo – 1988

=== Singles ===
- Frenetic Dancing – Gougnaf Mouvement, 1984
- Something's Gone Wrong Again – (Included with the Fanzine Rock Hardi) 1988
- Chess & Crimes / Sunday Time – Sub Pop, 1989
- As Happy As Possible – Sub Pop, 1993
- K.E.X.P. SESSION 10-07-2008, live radio, Seattle – Slow Death, 2011
- Birds Of Ill Omen / Motörhead – Pitshark Records, 2011

=== Albums ===
- Radical Hystery – 1986
- Electric Troubles – Vinyl Solution, 1987
- Dirty White Race – 1988
- Still Angry Still Hungry – 1989
- I.A.B.F. – Alternative Tentacles, 1991
- As Happy As Possible – Sub Pop, 1993
- Strike – Sub Pop, 1996
- Nineteen Something – Sub Pop, 1998
- Tout Doit Disparaître – Labels, 1999

=== Compilations ===
- Les Héros Du Peuple Sont Immortels – 1985
- Raw Cuts Vol. 1 Garage French – 1985
- Ultraviolette 2 demo – 1985
- Battle Of The Garage Vol. 4 Tomorrow The World – 1986
- Eyes On You – 1987
- Alternative Tentacles Virus 100 – 1992
- SP 20 Casual Nostalgia Fest – 2010
