= I've Been Around (album) =

2006 album by Ben E. King

Studio album by Ben E. King
- Released: January 31, 2006
- Genre: Soul
- Length: 51:35
- Label: True Life

Ben E. King chronology
Soul Masters (2005)	I've Been Around (2006)	Love Is Gonna Get You (2007)

I've Been Around is the 2006 release from Ben E. King. This album was released 45 years after his initial solo release Spanish Harlem.

== Track listing ==
1. "Here Is My Heart's Desire" – 3:31
2. "Rhythm of Love" – 3:45
3. "Show Me" – 4:26
4. "I've Been Around" – 5:01
5. "Just Remember" – 4:26
6. "You'll Never Know Who's Watching" – 5:08
7. "Please Stay" – 3:23
8. "Comparing Her to You" – 4:34
9. "Fly Away" – 4:26
10. "I'm Gonna Be the One" – 4:29
11. "Lady I Love You So" – 4:43
12. "I Bet You That" – 3:43
