= Eon (musician) =

Eon in 1992

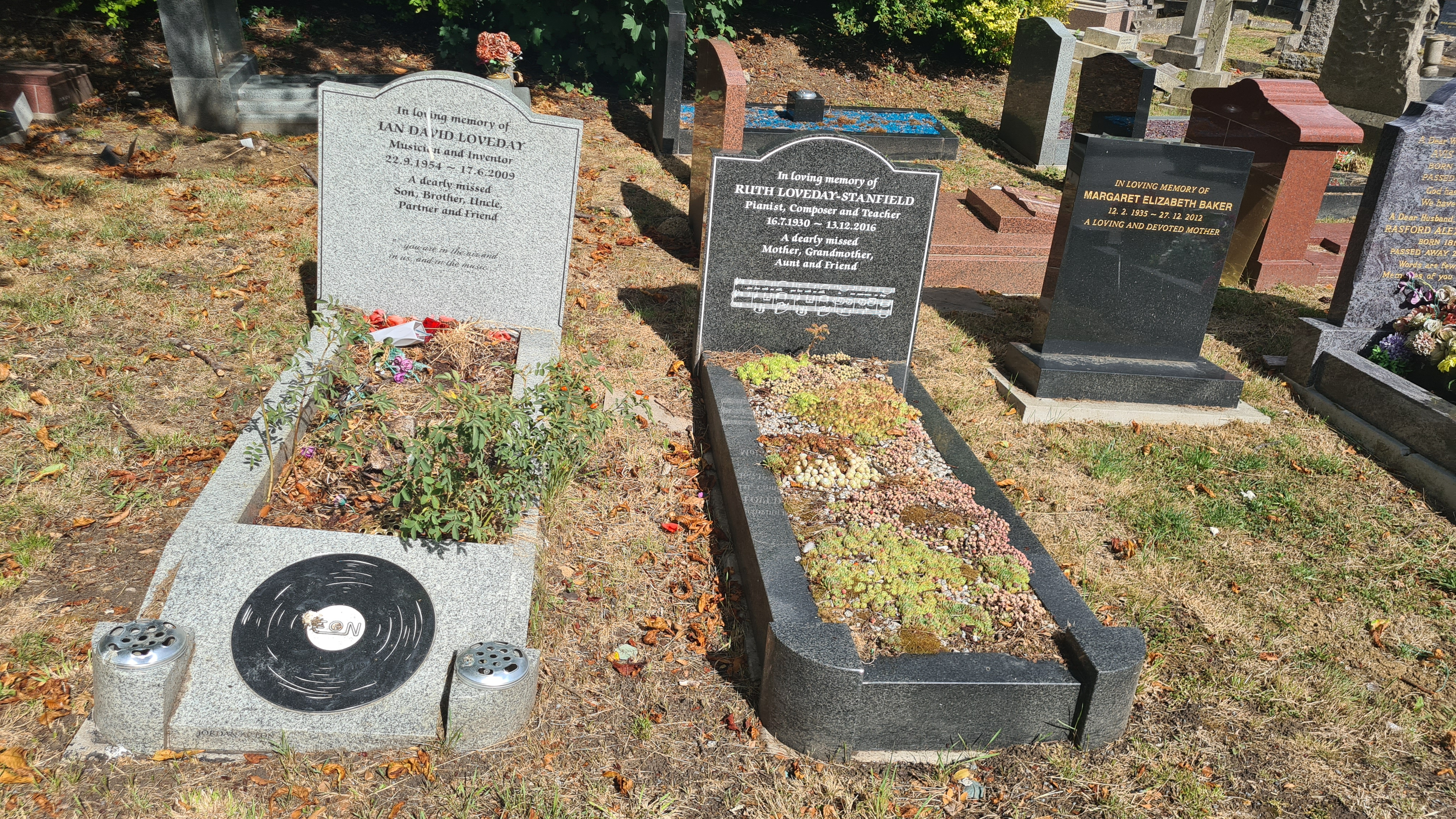
Tomb of Eon and his mother Ruth Stanfield at Kensal Green Cemetery, London

Ian Loveday, better known as Eon (22 September 1954 – 17 June 2009), was a British rave pioneer.

Born in 1954, Loveday was the son of violinist Alan Loveday and pianist Ruth Stanfield.

His tracks made their way to early 1990s pirate radio stations in London, and then out on vinyl through small labels like BAAD and Vinyl Solution. He released Void Dweller, with its dark and hard driving beats, on Columbia Records in September 1992; it used samples from David Lynch's Dune, The Outer Limits, and themes from the horror movie Basket Case.

His sound was a link between the early Detroit techno and contemporary dance music. In the early 1990s, this release was shared between DJs and musicians and was very influential. Eon was known for the acid techno song called "Spice" which was released in November 1990. Later in his career, he worked with Baby Ford and Bizarre Inc., and released singles on Trelik Records and Electron Industries.

== Death ==
Loveday died on 17 June 2009 in London, of complications from pneumonia.

== Discography ==
=== Albums ===
- Void Dweller (1992)
- Sum of Parts (2002)
- Device (2006)

=== Singles ===
- Light Colour Sound (Vinyl Solution - Storm 3) 12" (1988)
- Infinity (Vinyl Solution - Storm 4) 12" (1989)
- Inner Mind (Vinyl Solution - Storm 14) 12" (1990)
- Spice (Vinyl Solution - Storm 22) 12" (1990)
- Fear: The Mindkiller (Vinyl Solution - Storm 33) 12" (1991)
- Basket Case (Vinyl Solution - Storm 39) 12" (1992)
- Worlds Beyond (Vinyl Solution -Storm 66) 12" (1993)
- A Kind Of Living (Vinyl Solution - Storm 96) 12" (1994)
- Wave Angel (Electron Industries - TRON 2) 12" (1995)
- Phase Test (Electron Industries - TRON 8) 12" (1996)
- Absorbed (Longhaul - LH 01-6) 12" (2001)
- Tantalus V5 (Longhaul - LH 05-6) 12" (2002)
- Magazines Will Kill You (Umami - 12003) 12" (2005)

=== EP's ===
- Cybertone (Vinyl Solution - EON 2) 2x12" (Promo 1994)
- D:Delta (PAL - SL2) 12" (1997)
- Component X (krack tronik- KRAK 013) 12" (2007)
