= Angie Brown =

British singer and songwriter (born 1963)

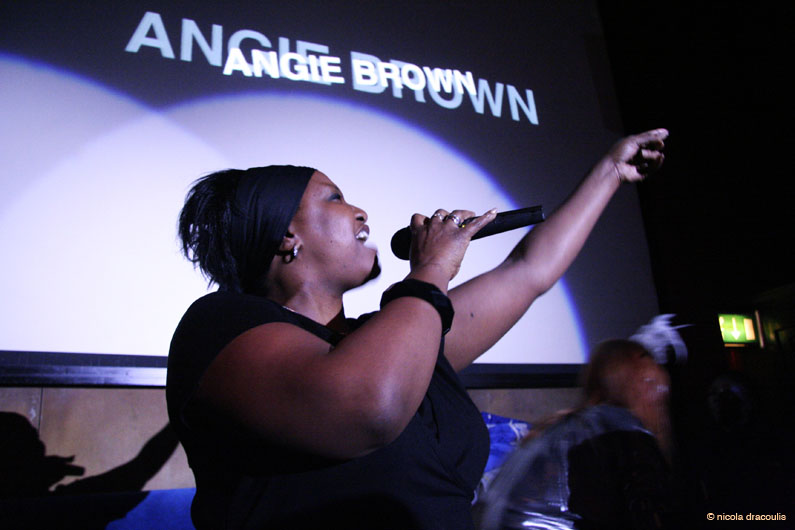
- Angie Brown in 2007

Background information
- Born: 13 June 1963 (age 62); Brixton, London, England
- Genres: House, electronic
- Occupations: Singer, songwriter
- Instrument: Singing
- Years active: 1990–present
- Labels: Warner Music, Sony Music Entertainment
- Website: http://www.angiebrown.com

Angie Brown (born 13 June 1963) is a British singer and songwriter from Brixton, South London.

Brown is a co-artist on the hit single "I'm Gonna Get You" (1992) by Bizarre Inc. She performed on a number of recordings with Bizarre Inc as lead vocalist, including the single "Took My Love" (1993). Brown also performed as the lead singer in "Beaten Up In Love Again", by the Thrashing Doves in 1991.

Brown performed in the bridge and chorus of the hit "Return of the Mack" (1996) by Mark Morrison. Brown has also performed backing vocals for Grace Jones, Beverley Knight, Mark Morrison, the Rolling Stones, the Dirty Strangers, Happy Mondays, Kate Bush, Chaka Khan, Heaven 17, Neneh Cherry, Lisa Stansfield, Mola Mola, the Stereophonics and Fat Boy Slim.

== Career ==
=== 1990s ===
Brown is a co-artist on the Bizarre Inc hit single "I'm Gonna Get You" (1992) and performed on a number of recordings with Bizarre Inc as lead vocalist including "Took My Love" (1993).

Brown is the featured vocalist on UK top twenty UK track "Rockin' for Myself" by Motiv8.

Brown performed in the bridge and chorus of the hit single "Return of the Mack" by British singer Mark Morrison. She is featured as a performer playing the role of the girlfriend in both the official single release and official music video in which model Susana Agrippa mimed to Brown's lead vocal section of the recording. As of August 2020, it has attracted in excess of 200,000,000 streams on YouTube. She also performed on other tracks from the album Return of the Mack, including the UK top 20 hit "Crazy".

Brown co-wrote and performed the 1999 single "Disco Heaven" with Holly Johnson of Frankie Goes to Hollywood.

=== 2000s ===
Brown performed backing vocals for Midge Ure on two tracks; "Beneath a Spielberg Sky" and "Somebody" taken from the album Move Me, released 25 September 2000. In 2001, she recorded backing vocals on Danish pop musician Thomas Helmig's album IsityouIsitme on RCA/BMG (Denmark). In 2003, Brown was a session vocalist on Welsh rock band Stereophonics' album You Gotta Go There to Come Back, singing on three tracks: "Jealousy", "High as the Ceiling", and the hit record "Maybe Tomorrow". She is credited as backing vocalist on Dutch Singer Jamai Loman's album of the same title released on BMG (Netherlands) in 2003.

=== 2010s ===
In 2014, Brown was approached by British/Canadian DJ Kissy Sell Out, co-writing and singing on the San City Record/Vicious Vinyl and Carrillo Music release "Deeper in Love".

Also in 2014, Brown appeared on an episode of the third series of The Voice UK, singing a live version of "I'm Gonna Get You".

Brown's vocals are featured throughout "The Mack" by Swedish DJ Nevada, Mark Morrison and Fetty Wap. Nevada's version features the original vocals of Mark Morrison and Angie Brown, and additional vocals from American rapper Fetty Wap. The song was released to digital download on 23 September 2016. It has been certified 2× platinum in Australia, gold in the US and New Zealand, and silver in the United Kingdom, while making chart appearances in many other countries.

=== 2020s ===
Brown collaborated with DJ Dougal and Ollie Jacobs on a track released on London based record label Champion Records.

== See also ==
- List of number-one dance hits (United States)
- List of artists who reached number one on the US Dance chart
