= Love Is Gonna Get You (album) =

Studio album by Ben E. King
- Released: October 30, 2007
- Genre: Soul
- Length: 51:35
- Label: Synergy Records

Ben E. King chronology
I've Been Around (2006)	Love Is Gonna Get You (2007)

Love Is Gonna Get You is the 2007 release from Ben E. King. This album is identical to the album Soul Masters, but has a different track order.

== Track listing ==
1. "Travelin' Woman" – 3:35
2. "Love Is" – 3:00
3. "Poison in My Wine" – 3:03
4. "Love Is Gonna Get You" – 3:23
5. "Only You and I Know" – 3:22
6. "She Does It Right with Nothing" – 4:02
7. "All of Your Tomorrows" – 4:56
8. "I Guess It's Goodbye" – 3:37
9. "Into the Mystic" – 3:50
10. "Take Me to the Pilot" – 3:42
11. "The Beginning of It All" – 3:24
12. "White Moon" – 2:38
