= Bizarre Inc =

English techno group

- Origin: Stafford, England
- Genres: Techno, house, breakbeat hardcore
- Years active: 1989–1996
- Labels: Blue Chip Records (1989); Sony Records (1992–1995); Vinyl Solution (1990–1994); Some Bizzare / Mercury Records (1996)
- Members: Andrew Meecham (1990–present); Dean Meredith (1989–present)
- Past members: Mark Archer (1989–1990); Carl Turner (1990–1997)

Bizarre Inc were an English techno/house group. Formed in 1989 as a duo between English DJs Dean Meredith and Mark Archer (who went onto found Altern-8), and re-formed as a trio consisting of Meredith, Andrew Meecham, and Carl Turner in 1990.

== Career ==
The group formed as Meredith and Archer linked to start an acid-house/techno project under 'Blue Chip Records'. A label owned by former Wigan Casino DJ Kev Roberts.

The first releases were (and still are) only available on 12'' vinyl: "It's Time to Get Funky" (BLUE C14R), later shortened to "Time to Get Funky" (BLUE C14RR); and the 6-track debut album Technological, both written and produced by Meredith and Archer.

By 1990, Archer left Meredith to work as producer and writer with different house and techno projects, including Nexus 21 and Altern-8 with co-producer Chris Peat). In the same year, two other experienced DJs – Andrew Meecham and Carl Turner – joined Bizarre Inc, thus forming a new trio. The first 12'' they released together was "Bizarre Theme" / "X-Static" on the now-defunct record label Vinyl Solution. This first track got a moderate acceptance, and their next single, "Such a Feeling", which sampled the Aurra club hit "Such a Feeling", peaked at number 13. The next single, "Playing with Knives", peaked at number 4; the song's vinyl (7-inch and 12-inch) releases were issued on a couple of different European labels.

On 19 October 1992, Bizarre Inc released the album Energique. shortly after the BPI Silver Certified "I'm Gonna Get You" single featuring Angie Brown was released on 21 September via Vinyl Solution on 12-inch vinyl. It reached number one on the United States Hot Dance Club Play chart for two weeks in January (also hitting number 47 on the Billboard Hot 100). The follow up "Took My Love", also made number one for two weeks on the Hot Dance Club chart in late April. Angie Brown is featured as lead vocalist on both releases. A third song, "Love in Motion" (featuring Yvonne Yanney), peaked at number 4 on the U.S. dance chart in late 1993. Three of Bizarre Inc's hit singles appeared on Energique in 1992. In 1994, a remix for Madonna's single "Secret" was included on both the U.S. 12" Single and CD Maxi-Single.

They also released a third album, the more commercial Surprise, on Some Bizzare in 1996.

Meecham and Meredith have continued releasing new music together under the name Chicken Lips. In the UK, their biggest singles remain "Playing with Knives" (number 4) and "I'm Gonna Get You" (number 3), the latter of which was a crossover dance-pop hit and was one of the biggest sellers of that year.

== Discography ==
=== Studio albums ===
Title	Album details	Peak chart positions
Title	Album details	UK
Technological	Released: 2 May 1989; Label: Blue Chip (BLUETEC1); Formats: LP	—
Energique	Released: 4 July 1992; Label: Vinyl Solution (STEAM47); Formats: LP, CD	41
Surprise	Released: 1996; Label: Mercury (514 819); Formats: LP, CD, CS	—
"—" denotes items that did not chart or were not released in that territory.

=== Singles ===
Year	Title	Peak chart positions										Certifications	Album
Year	Title	UK	BEL	EUR	IRE	NED	SCO	US	CAN Dance	UK Dance	US Dance	Certifications	Album
1989	"It's Time to Get Funky"	144	—	—	—	—	—	—	—	—	—		Non-album singles
1989	"Technological"	144	—	—	—	—	—	—	—	—	—		Non-album singles
1990	"Bizarre Theme"/"X-Static"	112	—	—	—	—	—	—	—	—	—		Non-album singles
1991	"Playing with Knives"	43	—	—	—	—	—	—	—	—	—		Non-album singles
1991	"Such a Feeling"	13	—	41	—	—	—	—	—	—	—		Non-album singles
1991	"Playing with Knives" (re-issue)	4	—	26	—	—	—	—	—	—	—		Energique
1992	"I'm Gonna Get You" (featuring Angie Brown)	3	14	19	17	3	—	47	1	—	1	UK: Silver	Energique
1993	"Took My Love" (featuring Angie Brown)	19	—	71	17	22	—	—	1	—	1		Energique
1993	"Love in Motion"	—	—	—	—	—	—	—	8	—	—		Energique
1993	"Agroovin'"	—	—	—	—	—	—	—	—	—	—		Energique
1996	"Keep the Music Strong"	33	—	54	—	—	39	—	—	3	—		Surprise
1996	"Surprise"	21	—	46	—	—	20	—	—	10	—		Surprise
1996	"Get Up (Sunshine Street)"	45	—	78	—	—	40	—	—	17	—		Surprise
1999	"Playing with Knives" (remix)	30	—	98	—	—	28	—	—	1	—		Non-album single
"—" denotes items that did not chart or were not released in that territory.

== See also ==
- List of artists who reached number one on the US Dance chart
