= Vinyl Solution =

British independent record label

Vinyl Solution was a record label of the late 1980s and early 1990s, the offshoot of an independent London-based record store based at 231 Portobello Road (now known as Intoxica Records). The label signed many unconventional acts in a number of uncompromising genres, such as skatepunk thrash band The Stupids, Britcore rappers Gunshot, and Bomb Disneyland. The label had its biggest success when one of the label's techno-dance groups, Bizarre Inc, made the UK Singles Chart with the song "Playing with Knives".

== Artists ==
=== Jonathan Saul Kane ===
Depth Charge's Jonathan Saul Kane was a key member in the organisation of the label, with a number of projects releasing discs on the label. In the mid 1990s he set up D.C. Recordings as a replacement for Vinyl Solution, with several other new offshoots catering for a number of subgenres in the dance music spectrum. The label's name was a pun on "The Final Solution", a Pere Ubu song.

=== Other artists ===
- Bizarre Inc
- Bolt Thrower
- The Bollweevils
- Bomb Disneyland/Bomb Everything
- Cancer
- Cerebral Fix
- Chemical People
- Edsel Auctioneer
- Eon
- The Fell Downs
- Fudge Tunnel
- Gunshot
- The Hard-ons
- Iowa Beef Experience
- Les Thugs
- The Madeira Cakes
- Mega City Four
- Mercedes Valentino
- Red Rockers
- Senseless Things
- Sink
- Soufflé With A Knife
- The Sound Asleep
- Spacemaggots
- The Stupids
- Testicular Warts
- The Venus Beads
- The Would Bes
- The Cateran

== See also ==
- List of record labels
- Visible Noise
