= Basia discography =

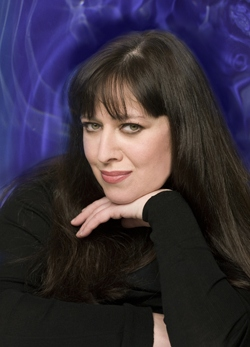
- Studio albums: 5
- Live albums: 2
- Compilation albums: 7
- Singles: 32
- Video albums: 1
- Music videos: 16

The discography of Polish-born singer-songwriter Basia consists of five solo studio albums, two live albums, seven compilations, and thirty-one singles. The artist has also released one video album and numerous music videos. Commercially, Basia's most successful period were the years 1987–1994 when she was signed to Epic Records. Her best-selling single reportedly is 1990's "Cruising for Bruising" from London Warsaw New York which in turn is her most successful album. The singer has enjoyed biggest commercial success in the US, Japan, France, and her native Poland.

For Basia's discography with Matt Bianco see Matt Bianco discography.

== Albums ==
=== Studio albums ===
Title	Album details	Peak chart positions								Certifications
Title	Album details	AUS	CAN	FRA	JPN	NLD	POL	UK	USA	Certifications
Time and Tide	Released: 3 April 1987; Label: Epic; Formats: LP, CD, cassette, download, streaming	50	—	16	—	—	—	61	36	FRA: Gold; JPN: Gold; USA: Platinum
London Warsaw New York	Released: February 1990; Label: Epic; Formats: LP, CD, cassette, download, streaming	114	56	28	33	60	—	68	20	FRA: Gold; JPN: Gold; USA: Platinum
The Sweetest Illusion	Released: 28 April 1994; Label: Epic; Formats: LP, CD, cassette, download, streaming	214	—	39	6	—	—	—	27	JPN: Platinum; USA: Gold
It's That Girl Again	Released: 11 March 2009; Label: Koch; Formats: CD, download, streaming	—	—	—	148	—	4	—	—	POL: Platinum
Butterflies	Released: 18 May 2018; Label: Shanachie; Formats: CD, download, streaming	—	—	—	279	—	15	—	—	

=== Live albums ===
Title	Album details	Peak chart positions
Title	Album details	JPN
Basia on Broadway	Released: 31 October 1995; Label: Sony Music Entertainment; Formats: CD, cassette, download, streaming	84
From Newport to London: Greatest Hits Live ... and More	Released: 13 September 2011; Label: eOne; Formats: CD, download, streaming	—

=== Compilation albums ===
Title	Album details	Peak chart positions
Title	Album details	JPN
The Best Remixes	Released: 1990; Label: Epic; Formats: CD	66
Brave New Hope	Released: 1990; Label: Epic; Formats: CD, cassette, download, streaming	—
The Best Remixes II	Released: 1991; Label: Epic; Formats: CD	—
Clear Horizon – The Best of Basia	Released: 11 November 1998; Label: Sony Music Entertainment; Formats: CD, cassette, download, streaming	50
Simple Pleasures	Released: 2003; Label: Sony Music; Formats: CD	—
Superhits	Released: July 2004; Label: Epic; Formats: CD, download, streaming	—
Playlist: The Very Best of Basia	Released: 15 October 2013; Label: Epic; Formats: CD	—

== Singles ==
=== As lead artist ===
Title	Year	Peak chart positions								Album
Title	Year	AUS	CAN	FRA	GER	NLD	UK	USA	USA AC	Album
"Prime Time TV"	1986	—	—	—	68	—	88	—	—	Time and Tide
"Run for Cover"	1986	—	—	—	—	—	—	—	—	Time and Tide
"Promises"	1987	—	78	—	—	—	48	—	8	Time and Tide
"Freeze Thaw"	1987	—	—	—	—	—	—	—	—	Time and Tide
"New Day for You"	1987	69	—	—	—	74	—	53	5	Time and Tide
"Time and Tide"	1987	158	94	—	—	—	61	26	19	Time and Tide
"Baby You're Mine"	1990	161	57	45	—	—	84	—	18	London Warsaw New York
"Cruising for Bruising"	1990	161	21	46	—	51	86	29	5	London Warsaw New York
"Copernicus"	1990	—	—	—	—	—	—	—	—	London Warsaw New York
"Until You Come Back to Me"	1990	—	—	—	—	—	—	—	33	London Warsaw New York
"Brave New Hope"	1990	—	—	—	—	—	—	—	—	Brave New Hope
"More Fire Than Flame"	1993	—	—	—	—	—	—	—	—	The Sweetest Illusion
"Yearning"	1994	—	—	—	—	—	—	—	—	The Sweetest Illusion
"Drunk on Love"	1994	247	—	—	—	—	41	—	—	The Sweetest Illusion
"Third Time Lucky"	1994	—	—	—	—	—	77	—	—	The Sweetest Illusion
"Half a Minute" (Live)	1995	—	—	—	—	—	—	—	—	Basia on Broadway
"Time and Tide" (Live)	1995	—	—	—	—	—	—	—	—	Basia on Broadway
"Angels Blush"	1995	—	—	—	—	—	—	—	—	Clear Horizon – The Best of Basia
"Clear Horizon"	1998	—	—	—	—	—	—	—	—	Clear Horizon – The Best of Basia
"Go for You"	1999	—	—	—	—	—	—	—	—	Clear Horizon – The Best of Basia
"A Gift"	2009	—	—	—	—	—	—	—	—	It's That Girl Again
"Blame It on the Summer"	2009	—	—	—	—	—	—	—	—	It's That Girl Again
"I Must"	2009	—	—	—	—	—	—	—	—	It's That Girl Again
"If Not Now Then When"	2010	—	—	—	—	—	—	—	—	It's That Girl Again
"From Newport to London"	2011	—	—	—	—	—	—	—	—	From Newport to London: Greatest Hits Live ... and More
"Wandering" (with Mietek Szcześniak)	2012	—	—	—	—	—	—	—	—	From Newport to London: Greatest Hits Live ... and More
"Matteo"	2018	—	—	—	—	—	—	—	—	Butterflies
"Bubble"	2018	—	—	—	—	—	—	—	—	Butterflies

=== As featured artist ===
Title	Year	Album
"Just Another Day" (Peter White featuring Basia)	1996	Caravan of Dreams
"So Nice (Summer Samba)" (Taro Hakase featuring Basia)	1999	Duets
"Save the Best for Last" (Mietek Szcześniak featuring Basia)	2012	Signs
"Fire & Ice" (The Clarisse Sisters featuring Basia)	2021	Fire & Ice

== Other appearances ==
- 1984: Matt Bianco – Whose Side Are You On?
- 1985: David Cassidy – Romance (song "Romance (Let Your Heart Go)")
- 1993: Perfect – Historie nieznane 1971–1991 (song "Obłęd w podmiejskiej dyskotece")
- 1999: Spyro Gyra – Got the Magic (song "Springtime Laughter")
- 2004: Matt Bianco – Matt's Mood
- 2009: Peter White – Good Day (song "Love Will Find You")
- 2014: Monika Lidke – If I Was to Describe You (song "Tum Tum Song")
- 2015: Pectus – Kobiety (song "Ostatnia z niedziel")

== Videography ==
=== Video albums ===
Title	Album details
A New Day	Released: 1990; Label: CMV, CBS; Formats: VHS, LaserDisc, DVD

=== Music videos ===
Title	Year	Director
"Prime Time TV" (Version 1)	1987	—N/a
"Run for Cover"	1987	—N/a
"New Day for You" (Version 1)	1987	—N/a
"Promises" (Version 1)	1988	—N/a
"Time and Tide"	1988	Nick Morris
"New Day for You" (Version 2)	1989	Jon Small
"Prime Time TV" (Version 2)	1989	Crescenzo G.P. Notarile
"Promises" (Version 2)	1989	Crescenzo G.P. Notarile
"Baby You're Mine"	1990	Nick Morris
"Cruising for Bruising"	1990	Nick Morris
"Until You Come Back to Me"	1990	Nick Morris
"Yearning"	1994	Howard Greenhalgh
"Drunk on Love"	1994	Nick Morris
"Third Time Lucky"	1994	Nick Morris
"So Nice (Summer Samba)" (with Taro Hakase)	1999	—N/a
"Matteo" (Lyric Video)	2018	—N/a
