= Clear Horizon – The Best of Basia =

Compilation album by Basia
- Released: November 11, 1998
- Recorded: 1986–1998
- Genres: Jazz-pop; sophisti-pop
- Length: 73:19
- Label: Sony Music Entertainment
- Producers: Danny White; Basia Trzetrzelewska

Basia chronology
Basia on Broadway (1995)	Clear Horizon – The Best of Basia (1998)	It's That Girl Again (2009)

Professional ratings
Review scores
Source	Rating
AllMusic	4.5/5 stars

Clear Horizon – The Best of Basia is a greatest hits compilation album by Polish-born singer Basia, released in November 1998 by Sony Music Entertainment.

== Overview ==
The album consists of 17 songs, four of which were originally released on Basia's debut album, Time and Tide (1987), two from London Warsaw New York (1990), five from The Sweetest Illusion (1994), and two from the live album Basia on Broadway (1995). The remaining four songs were original recordings made exclusively for this compilation, although "Angels Blush" had been released as a standalone single back in 1995. The cover photograph was taken by Simon Fowler.

The compilation was first released on 11 November 1998 in Japan, with the worldwide premiere following on 18 November. The title song was released as the lead single and reached no. 31 on Tokio Hot 100 chart on Japanese radio station J-Wave in December 1998. "Go for You" followed as a radio single in Poland in 1999. The compilation was titled Clear Horizon – The Best Of... in some territories, and was Basia's final release for Sony. The album was not a commercial success due to lack of promotion from the label.

== Track listing ==
No.	Title	Writer(s)	Original album	Length
1.	"Clear Horizon"	Basia Trzetrzelewska, Danny White	—	4:13
2.	"Cruising for Bruising"	Trzetrzelewska, White	London Warsaw New York	4:09
3.	"Drunk on Love"	Trzetrzelewska, White, Peter Ross	The Sweetest Illusion	4:44
4.	"Time and Tide"	Trzetrzelewska, White	Time and Tide	4:00
5.	"Waters of March"	Antônio Carlos Jobim	—	3:57
6.	"Third Time Lucky"	Trzetrzelewska, White	The Sweetest Illusion	5:01
7.	"Promises"	Trzetrzelewska, White, Ross	Time and Tide	4:02
8.	"Baby You're Mine"	Trzetrzelewska, White	London Warsaw New York	3:34
9.	"Yearning"	Trzetrzelewska, White	The Sweetest Illusion	5:21
10.	"Astrud"	Trzetrzelewska, White	Time and Tide	4:40
11.	"An Olive Tree"	Trzetrzelewska, White, Kevin Robinson	The Sweetest Illusion	4:58
12.	"Go for You"	Trzetrzelewska, White	—	4:04
13.	"New Day for You"	Trzetrzelewska, White, Ross	Time and Tide	4:30
14.	"Perfect Mother"	Trzetrzelewska, White	The Sweetest Illusion	3:51
15.	"From Now On" (live)	Trzetrzelewska, White	Basia on Broadway	3:55
16.	"Half a Minute" (live)	Mark Riley, White, Kito Poncioni	Basia on Broadway	3:53
17.	"Angels Blush"	Trzetrzelewska, White	—	3:58

== Charts ==
Chart (1998)	Peak position
Japan (Oricon)	50
