= From Newport to London: Greatest Hits Live... and More =

From Newport to London: Greatest Hits Live ... and More

Live album by Basia
- Released: 13 September 2011
- Recorded: 2011
- Genre: Smooth jazz
- Length: 77:28
- Label: eOne
- Producers: Danny White; Basia Trzetrzelewska

Basia chronology
It's That Girl Again (2009)	From Newport to London: Greatest Hits Live ... and More (2011)	Playlist: The Very Best of Basia (2013)

Professional ratings
Review scores
Source	Rating
AllMusic	3.5/5 stars
Blogcritics	Positive
Smooth Jazz Therapy	Positive

From Newport to London: Greatest Hits Live ... and More is the second live album by Polish-born singer Basia, released in September 2011 by eOne Music.

== Overview ==
The album consists of 15 songs recorded live in Klub Wytwórnia in Łódź, Poland, on 29 June 2011, and three bonus studio tracks. Of the live tracks, six were originally recorded for her 1987 debut album, Time and Tide ("How Dare You", "Astrud", "New Day for You", "From Now On", "Promises", and "Time and Tide"), two from her 1990 release London Warsaw New York ("Cruising for Bruising" and "Copernicus"), three from the 1994 album The Sweetest Illusion ("Third Time Lucky", "Drunk on Love", and "An Olive Tree"), and four from her 2009 album It's That Girl Again ("If Not Now Then When", "Love Lies Bleeding", "I Must", and "A Gift"). The latter is a duet with Ada Szulc, one of the contestants of the Polish edition of X Factor, with whom Basia had performed this song live on the show several weeks earlier. Of the three studio recordings, "There's a Tear" is an acoustic remake of a song that originally appeared on It's That Girl Again. The remaining two tracks are original to this album, including "Wandering", a duet with Polish singer Mietek Szcześniak .

The title song was inspired by Basia's love for European film music and the world of art. The lyrics tell "the story of falling in love with a stranger on the train" and were written during a train journey from New York to Boston in June 2010 when Basia was on her US tour. The track was released as a digital single in August 2011. The album premiered in the United States on 13 September 2011. In Poland, it was released on 14 October 2011. "Wandering" received radio airplay in Poland in early 2012.

== Track listing ==
No.	Title	Writer(s)	Length
1.	"Third Time Lucky"	Basia Trzetrzelewska, Danny White	5:25
2.	"Drunk on Love"	Trzetrzelewska, White, Peter Ross	4:42
3.	"Cruising for Bruising"	Trzetrzelewska, White	4:29
4.	"How Dare You"	Trzetrzelewska, White	4:25
5.	"If Not Now Then When"	Trzetrzelewska, White, Kevin Robinson	3:10
6.	"Love Lies Bleeding"	Trzetrzelewska, White	3:02
7.	"I Must"	Trzetrzelewska, White	4:41
8.	"Astrud"	Trzetrzelewska, White	4:20
9.	"New Day for You"	Trzetrzelewska, White, Ross	4:02
10.	"A Gift"	Trzetrzelewska, White	3:48
11.	"An Olive Tree"	Trzetrzelewska, White, Robinson	4:58
12.	"From Now On"	Trzetrzelewska, White	4:41
13.	"Promises"	Trzetrzelewska, White, Ross	4:08
14.	"Time and Tide"	Trzetrzelewska, White	4:09
15.	"Copernicus"	Trzetrzelewska, White	4:54
16.	"There's a Tear" (acoustic studio recording)	Trzetrzelewska, White	4:17
17.	"Wandering" (studio recording)	Trzetrzelewska, White	3:44
18.	"From Newport to London" (studio recording)	Trzetrzelewska, White	4:33

== Personnel ==
- Basia – lead vocals
- Danny White – keyboards
- Paul Booth – flute (alto), percussion, saxophone, background vocals
- Veronique Clarisse – background vocals
- Annick Clarisse-Willequet – background vocals
- Andy Lafone – bass
- Marc Parnell – drums
- Kevin Robinson – flugelhorn, percussion, trumpet, background vocals
- Giorgio Serci – guitar
- Mietek Szcześniak – guest vocals
- Ada Szulc – guest vocals

== Charts ==
Chart (2011)	Peak position
US Top Jazz Albums (Billboard)	13
US Top Contemporary Jazz Albums (Billboard)	6
