= Basia on Broadway =

Live album by Basia
- Released: October 31, 1995
- Recorded: November 24 & 25, 1994
- Venue: Neil Simon Theatre
- Genres: Jazz-pop; sophisti-pop
- Length: 76:12
- Languages: English; Polish
- Label: Sony Music Entertainment
- Producers: Danny White; Basia Trzetrzelewska

Basia chronology
The Sweetest Illusion (1994)	Basia on Broadway (1995)	Clear Horizon – The Best of Basia (1998)

Professional ratings
Review scores
Source	Rating
AllMusic	3/5 stars
Gazeta Wyborcza	Positive

Basia on Broadway is a live album by Polish-born singer Basia, released in October 1995 by Sony Music.

== Overview ==
The album consists of 16 songs recorded live at the Neil Simon Theatre in New York City on November 24 & 25, 1994, during Basia's two-week concert run on Broadway – hence the album's subtitle Live at the Neil Simon Theatre. Of these songs, four were originally recorded for Basia's 1987 debut album, Time and Tide ("From Now On", "New Day for You", "Promises", and "Time and Tide"), with seven others from her 1990 release London Warsaw New York ("Copernicus", "Cruising for Bruising", "Baby You're Mine", "Take Him Back Rachel", "Reward", "Until You Come Back to Me", and "Brave New Hope"), and three from her 1994 album The Sweetest Illusion ("Third Time Lucky", "Drunk on Love", and "Yearning"). "Half a Minute" originates from the debut Matt Bianco album Whose Side Are You On? (1984). "Dzień się budzi" (English: "The Day Is Dawning") is a cover of a song popularized in Poland in the 1960s, and is the only track on the album performed in Basia's native Polish. Live versions of "Half a Minute" and "Time and Tide" were released as singles in the UK and Japan, respectively, to promote the album.

== Track listing ==
No.	Title	Writer(s)	Length
1.	"Copernicus"	Basia Trzetrzelewska, Danny White	4:09
2.	"Cruising for Bruising"	Trzetrzelewska, White	4:46
3.	"Third Time Lucky"	Trzetrzelewska, White	5:15
4.	"Drunk on Love"	Trzetrzelewska, Peter Ross, White	5:02
5.	"From Now On"	Trzetrzelewska, White	3:57
6.	"Baby You're Mine"	Trzetrzelewska, White	3:38
7.	"Yearning"	Trzetrzelewska, White	6:05
8.	"Take Him Back Rachel"	Trzetrzelewska, White	4:43
9.	"New Day for You"	Trzetrzelewska, Ross, White	5:09
10.	"Promises"	Trzetrzelewska, Ross, White	5:24
11.	"Time and Tide"	Trzetrzelewska, Ross, White	3:53
12.	"Half a Minute"	Mark Reilly, White, Kito Poncioni	3:56
13.	"Reward"	Trzetrzelewska, White	6:28
14.	"Until You Come Back to Me"	Morris Broadnax, Clarence Paul, Stevie Wonder	4:39
15.	"Dzień się budzi"	Katarzyna Gärtner, Jerzy Kleyny	3:43
16.	"Brave New Hope"	Trzetrzelewska, White	5:25

== Personnel ==
- Basia − lead vocals
- Danny White − keyboards, acoustic piano
- Fayyaz Virji − keyboards, shaker, trombone
- Peter White − keyboards, guitars
- Randy Hope-Taylor − bass
- Richard Bailey − drums
- Karl Van Den Bossche − percussion
- Jay Beckenstein − soprano sax solo (7)
- Chris De'Margary − flute, saxophones
- Kevin Robinson − flugelhorn, trumpet, backing vocals
- Annick Clarisse − backing vocals
- Veronique Clarisse − backing vocals
- Dee Johnson − backing vocals

== Production ==
- Producers – Basia and Danny White
- Live Recording Producer – Louis Larose
- Live Recording Engineer – Randy Ezratty
- Mixed by Steven Venezia at Whitfield Street Recording Studios (London, England), assisted by Jason Scott Westbrook.
- Mastered by Vlado Meller at Sony Music Studios (New York, NY).
- Photography – Paul Cox
- Live Photography – Kevin Mazur
- Management – Dee Anthony and Joshua Simons for BTB Management Group, Inc.

== Charts ==
Chart (1995)	Peak position
Japan (Oricon)	84
