= It's That Girl Again =

2009 studio album by Basia

Studio album by Basia
- Released: 11 March 2009
- Genres: Jazz-pop; bossa nova
- Length: 55:06
- Languages: English; Polish
- Label: Koch
- Producers: Danny White; Basia Trzetrzelewska

Basia chronology
Clear Horizon – The Best of Basia (1998)	It's That Girl Again (2009)	From Newport to London: Greatest Hits Live ... and More (2011)

Professional ratings
Review scores
Source	Rating
AllMusic	3.5/5 stars
Audio.com.pl	4/5 stars
Blogcritics	Positive
Jazz Forum	4/5 stars
SmoothViews	Positive

It's That Girl Again is the fourth solo studio album by Polish singer Basia, released on 11 March 2009 by Koch Records. It is her first studio album in fifteen years since 1994's The Sweetest Illusion.

== Overview ==
It's That Girl Again was Basia's first solo studio album in 15 years, following 1994's The Sweetest Illusion. In the meantime, she recorded a reunion album with Matt Bianco, 2004's Matt's Mood, released a solo live album, a compilation, and made guest appearances on other artists' albums. The semi-hiatus was caused by depression after the passing of Basia's mother and other close people.

Work on the album commenced at the end of 2006, shortly after Basia finished touring with Matt Bianco, and the material was completed before the end of 2007. The title song was one of the first tracks composed for the project, and was inspired by a friend of Basia, who had died several years prior to the release of the album. The album also features "Amelki śmiech" (English: "Amelka's Laughter"), Basia's first song performed entirely in Polish.

Since her contract with Sony had already expired, the singer had certain difficulties finding a new label, but the album was eventually released through Koch Records (later renamed to Entertainment One Music) in most territories, and distributed by Magic Records in Poland. The ballad "A Gift" was launched as the first radio single in Poland in February 2009, followed by "Blame It on the Summer" on the US radio in March and subsequently in digital music stores. "A Gift" targeted AC/pop radio stations while "Blame It on the Summer" was serviced to more jazz-oriented networks. "I Must" was a radio single in Poland in September 2009 and "If Not Now Then When" followed in May 2010 as a radio single in the USA. The singer has revealed that there were plans to film music videos for "A Gift" and "I Must", however, if ever filmed, the clips have never been officially released.

== Track listing ==
All lyrics are written by Basia Trzetrzelewska; all music is composed by Trzetrzelewska and Danny White, except where noted.

No.	Title	Music	Length
1.	"If Not Now Then When"	Trzetrzelewska; White; Kevin Robinson	4:51
2.	"Someone for Everyone"	Trzetrzelewska; White; Mark Reilly	4:13
3.	"I Must"		4:58
4.	"A Gift"		3:43
5.	"Everybody's on the Move"		3:49
6.	"There's a Tear"		4:15
7.	"Blame It on the Summer"	Trzetrzelewska; White; Andy Ross	4:29
8.	"Two Islands"		4:44
9.	"Love Lies Bleeding"		4:05
10.	"Winners"		3:58
11.	"They Know Nothing About Us"		4:07
12.	"Amelki śmiech"		3:59
13.	"It's That Girl Again"		3:55

European iTunes, Japanese edition and Borders exclusive edition bonus tracks
No.	Title	Length
14.	"Oh Mama" (featuring Basia Serocka)	3:55
15.	"Clear Horizon (2009)"	4:06

Special edition bonus tracks
No.	Title	Length
14.	"Clear Horizon (2009)"	4:06
15.	"Oh Mama" (featuring Basia Serocka)	3:55

Special edition bonus DVD
No.	Title	Director	Length
1.	"Basia – Droga do sławy"
2.	"Third Time Lucky"	Nick Morris
3.	"Yearning"	Howard Greenhalgh
4.	"Drunk on Love"	Nick Morris
5.	"Cruising for Bruising"	Nick Morris
6.	"Baby You're Mine"	Nick Morris
7.	"Until You Come Back to Me"	Nick Morris
8.	"Time & Tide"	Nick Morris
9.	"New Day for You"	Nick Morris

== Personnel ==
- Basia Trzetrzelewska – vocals
- Danny White – keyboards
- Peter White – guitars
- Andy Ross – guitars (6, 7, 9)
- Julian Crampton – bass (2)
- Marc Parnell – drums
- Paul Booth – saxophones (1, 6)
- Ian Kirkham – saxophones (5)
- Fayyaz Virji – trombone (1)
- Kevin Robinson – trumpet, flugelhorn, French horn, backing vocals
- Mark Reilly – backing vocals (2)
- The Polish Chorus – choir (12)

== Production ==
- Basia Trzetrzelewska – producer
- Danny White – producer
- David Bascombe – mixing
- Richard Bull – mastering
- Grainne White – design
- Paul Cox – portrait photography
- Carl Leighton-Pope – management

== Charts ==
Chart performance for It's That Girl Again
Chart (2009)	Peak position
Japanese Albums (Oricon)	148
Polish Albums (ZPAV)	4
US Top Contemporary Jazz Albums (Billboard)	5
US Top Jazz Albums (Billboard)	8

== Certifications ==
Certifications for It's That Girl Again
Region	Certification	Certified units/sales
Poland (ZPAV)	Platinum	20,000^{*}
^{*} Sales figures based on certification alone.

== Release history ==
Release dates and formats for It's That Girl Again
Region	Date	Format	Label
Japan	11 March 2009	CD	WHD Entertainment
United States	24 March 2009	CD	Koch
Europe	30 March 2009	Digital download (iTunes only)	Koch
Europe	7 April 2009	Digital download (other stores)	Koch
Poland	17 April 2009	CD	Magic
Poland	2 October 2009	Special edition CD + DVD	Magic
