= Brave New Hope =

EP by Basia
- Released: 1990
- Recorded: 1986–1990
- Genres: Jazz-pop; sophisti-pop
- Length: 34:26 (original release); 42:10 (reissue)
- Label: Epic
- Producers: Danny White; Basia Trzetrzelewska

Basia chronology
London Warsaw New York (1990)	Brave New Hope (1990)	The Sweetest Illusion (1994)

Professional ratings
Review scores
Source	Rating
AllMusic	3/5 stars

Brave New Hope is an EP by Polish singer Basia, released by Epic Records in 1990.

== Overview ==
The compilation was originally released in the United States as an EP featuring seven songs (Epic CD 49K-73593). Of these, the title track is presented twice: in its original version from the album London Warsaw New York and also in a new mix (subtitled "Brave New Mix"). The other tracks include Phil Harding remixes of two other songs from London Warsaw New York: "Until You Come Back to Me (That's What I'm Gonna Do)" and "Cruising for Bruising", an alternative version of "From Now On", first available on Basia's 1986 single "Run for Cover", and two non-album songs, "Masquerade" and "Come to Heaven", previously available only as B-sides on singles "Baby You're Mine" and "Cruising for Bruising", respectively. A later release of the album (Epic CD EK 48644) added two more songs, "Give Me That" and "Forgive and Forget", previously unavailable on the US market and only released as B-sides in Europe and Japanese edition of Time and Tide. The compilation wasn't available in Japan, where instead the new mix of "Brave New Hope" was released as a CD single, backed with the remix of "Until You Come Back to Me".

== Track listing ==
=== Original release ===
No.	Title	Writer(s)	Length
1.	"Brave New Hope"	Danny White, Basia Trzetrzelewska	4:06
2.	"Until You Come Back to Me (That's What I'm Gonna Do)" (Phil Harding 12" Remix)	Stevie Wonder, Clarence Paul, Morris Broadnax	6:35
3.	"Brave New Hope" (Brave New Mix)	White, Trzetrzelewska	4:06
4.	"Cruising for Bruising" (Phil Harding 12" Remix)	White, Trzetrzelewska	6:46
5.	"From Now On" (Band Version)	Trzetrzelewska, White	4:05
6.	"Masquerade"	Trzetrzelewska, White, Peter Ross	4:32
7.	"Come to Heaven"	Trzetrzelewska, White, Ross	4:10

=== Reissue ===
No.	Title	Writer(s)	Length
1.	"Brave New Hope"	Danny White, Basia Trzetrzelewska	4:06
2.	"Until You Come Back to Me (That's What I'm Gonna Do)" (12" Remix)	Stevie Wonder, Clarence Paul, Morris Broadnax	6:38
3.	"Brave New Hope" (Brave New Mix)	White, Trzetrzelewska	4:07
4.	"Give Me That"	Trzetrzelewska, White	4:24
5.	"Cruising for Bruising" (12" Remix)	White, Trzetrzelewska	6:48
6.	"Forgive and Forget"	Trzetrzelewska, White	3:14
7.	"From Now On" (Band Version)	Trzetrzelewska, White	4:05
8.	"Masquerade"	Trzetrzelewska, White, Peter Ross	4:33
9.	"Come to Heaven"	Trzetrzelewska, White, Ross	4:09
