= Wrong Side of the Street =

Wrong Side of the Street may refer to:

- "Wrong Side of the Street", a song by Bruce Springsteen on his 2010 album The Promise: The Darkness on the Edge of Town Story
- "Wrong Side of the Street", a song by Matt Bianco on his 2004 album Matt's Mood
