= Butterflies (Basia album) =

Studio album by Basia
- Released: 16 May 2018
- Genres: Jazz-pop; smooth jazz
- Length: 42:26
- Label: Shanachie
- Producers: Danny White; Basia Trzetrzelewska

Basia chronology
Playlist: The Very Best of Basia (2013)	Butterflies (2018)

Professional ratings
Review scores
Source	Rating
AllMusic	4/5 stars
Audio.com.pl	4/5 stars
JazzSoul.pl	4/5 stars
Polska Płyta / Polska Muzyka	4/5 stars
Something Else!	Favorable

Butterflies is the fifth studio album by Polish singer-songwriter Basia, released in 2018 by Shanachie Records. It is her first studio album in nine years since 2009's It's That Girl Again.

== Overview ==
The album was Basia's first studio release in nine years. The singer has described it as an album "about love – for life, for music and for people" and her jazziest record yet. She has also revealed that its original title was Be.Pop, after one of the songs and as a reference to subgenre of jazz music, but her record company wasn't keen on the idea. To compromise, Basia suggested Be.Pop Butterfly, but ultimately the title was changed to Butterflies. Two songs on the album contain the word 'butterfly', including "Liang & Zhu" which tells about the Butterfly Lovers from a Chinese legend.

The lead single from Butterflies, "Matteo", premiered on 6 April 2018. The album was first released in Japan on 16 May 2018 through Shanachie and P-Vine Records, with an alternative cover. The general worldwide release took place on 18 May 2018. In Poland, the album was made available for streaming a week in advance, and was then released on other platforms by Shanachie Records and Magic Records, a subsidiary of Universal Music.

Track 8, co-written by Basia, Danny White and Mark Reilly, and which also features all three singing and/or playing on the recording, represents a de facto reunion of the 1980s trio Matt Bianco.

== Track listing ==
All songs written by Basia Trzetrzelewska and Danny White, co-writers indicated.

1. "Bubble" – 3:50
2. "Matteo" (Giorgio Serci, Basia Trzetrzelewska and Danny White) – 3:40
3. "No Heartache" – 4:34
4. "Butterfly" – 4:33
5. "Where's Your Pride" – 4:07
6. "Be.Pop" – 3:59
7. "Liang & Zhu" – 3:17
8. "Show Time" (Mark Reilly, Basia Trzetrzelewska, Danny White) – 4:28
9. "Like Crazy" – 4:20
10. "Rachel's Waltz" – 1:15
11. "Pandora's Box" – 4:23

== Personnel ==
- Basia Trzetrzelewska – vocals
- Danny White – keyboards, acoustic piano
- Peter White – guitars (1, 3, 5, 6, 8, 9, 11)
- Giorgio Serci – guitars (2)
- Richard Bull – guitars (9)
- Andres Lafone – bass guitar (1, 2, 8)
- Maciej Dobrzański – double bass (3, 11)
- Marc Parnell – drums (1–6, 8–11)
- Peter Ross – drums (6)
- Tomasz Bilecki – percussion (1, 3, 5, 6, 8, 11)
- Miles Bould – percussion (2)
- Artur Stodolny – vibraphone (6)
- Jakub Muras – baritone saxophone (1, 3, 5, 6)
- Paul Booth – bass clarinet (1), saxophone (3, 5, 6, 11)
- Roger Clarke – bassoon (1, 10)
- Łukasz Jankowski – flute (6, 10, 11)
- Jakub Gumiński – trombone (1, 3, 5, 6, 8)
- Pitor Tchórzewski – trombone (1, 3, 5, 6, 8)
- Damian Wójtowicz – trombone (1, 3, 5, 6, 8)
- Bartłomiej Koń – trumpet (1, 6, 8, 11)
- Aneta Mścisz – trumpet (1, 6, 8, 11)
- Kamil Zwoliński – trumpet (1, 6, 8, 11)
- Kevin Robinson – trumpet (3, 8, 11)
- Mateusz Zieliński – tuba (1, 2, 10)
- Andy Ross – strings (7)
- Mark Reilly – vocals (8)

== Production ==
- Basia Trzetrzelewska – producer, arrangements
- Danny White – producer, arrangements
- David Bascombe – mixing
- Nigel Walton – mastering
- Paul Cox – photography
- Grainne White – artwork, design
- Toshikazu Kanazawa – liner notes in Japanese edition
- Helen Whiting – make-up
- Paula Wootton – hair
- Pitor Kostrzewa – big band leader

== Charts ==
Chart (2018)	Peak position
Japan (Oricon)	279
Poland (OLiS)	15
US Billboard Independent Albums	50
US Billboard Jazz Albums	4
