= Got the Magic (Spyro Gyra album) =

Studio album by Spyro Gyra
- Released: 1999
- Recorded: 1999
- Studio: BearTracks Studios (Suffern, New York)
- Genre: Jazz
- Length: 55:35
- Label: Windham Hill Jazz
- Producer: Jay Beckenstein; Jeff Beal; Chuck Loeb; Julio Fernández; Jason Miles; Tom Schuman; Jeremy Wall

Spyro Gyra chronology
Road Scholars (1998)	Got the Magic (1999)	In Modern Times (2001)

Professional ratings
Review scores
Source	Rating
AllMusic	4/5 stars
The Encyclopedia of Popular Music	3/5 stars

Got the Magic is the 21st studio album by the American jazz group Spyro Gyra. It was released in 1999 by Windham Hill Records.

== Critical reception ==
AllMusic wrote that "mid- to up-tempo concoctions like 'Silk and Satin' and 'Havana Moonlight' make for some very pleasant listening, and the addition of old bandmate Dave Samuels' vibes on 'Breezeway' and 'Sierra' brings back the sound that attracted the group's audience in the first place."

== Track listing ==
1. "Silk and Satin" (Chuck Loeb) – 5:31
2. "Breezeway" (Jeremy Wall) – 4:49
3. "Havana Moonlight" (Jay Beckenstein) – 4:54
4. "Springtime Laughter" (Jeff Beal, Joan Beal) – 4:51
5. "If You Will" (Beckenstein, Loeb) – 5:16
6. "Got the Magic" (Julio Fernandez) – 4:26
7. "Teardrops" (Beckenstein, Jason Miles) – 5:28
8. "Pure Mood" (Loeb) – 5:58
9. "Sierra" (Beckenstein) – 5:08
10. "Love Comes" (Tom Schuman, Fernandez) – 4:47
11. "R.S.V.P." (Scott Kreitzer, Randy Andos) – 4:27

== Personnel ==
Spyro Gyra

- Jay Beckenstein – saxophones
- Tom Schuman – keyboards
- Julio Fernandez – guitars, backing vocals (8, 9, 10), vocal arrangements (6, 10), scat vocal (9)
- Scott Ambush – bass
- Joel Rosenblatt – drums

Additional musicians

- Jeff Beal – keyboards (4), vocal arrangements (4)
- Mike Ricchiuti – additional keyboards (11)
- Dave Charles – percussion
- Dave Samuels – vibraphone (2, 9), marimba (2, 9)
- Jason Miles – drum programming (7)
- Scott Kreitzer – flute (1, 3, 6)
- Basia Trzetrzelewska – all vocals (4), vocal arrangements (4)
- Billy Clif – backing vocals (6, 10)
- Andrika Hall – backing vocals (6, 10)
- Carmen Cuesta – backing vocals (8, 9)
- Philip Hamilton – backing vocals (8, 9)
- Kay Gile – backing vocals (10)

No Sweat Horns

- Scott Kreitzer – saxophones, horn arrangements (11)
- Randy Andros – trombone, horn arrangements (11)
- Barry Danielian – trumpet, horn arrangements

=== Production ===
- Jay Beckenstein – executive producer, co-producer (1, 2, 5, 8, 9, 11), producer (3, 4, 6, 7, 10)
- Chuck Loeb – producer (1, 2, 5, 8, 9, 11)
- Jeremy Wall – co-producer (2, 3, 7)
- Julio Fernández – co-producer (3, 10), producer (6)
- Jeff Beal – producer (4)
- Jason Miles – co-producer (7)
- Tom Schuman – co-producer (10)
- Phil Magnotti – recording, mixing (1–3, 5–11)
- Doug Oberkircher – recording, mixing (4)
- Steve Regina – additional recording
- Brian Quackenbush – mix assistant
- Scott Hull – mastering at Masterdisk (New York, NY)
- John Caron – production manager
- Sonny Mediana – art direction
- Sanae Robinson – design
- David Blankenship – photography
- Alan Nahgian – photography

== Charts ==
Chart (1999)	Peak position
Billboard Jazz Albums	5
