= St. John's Church, Gdańsk =

Church in Gdańsk, Poland

Coordinates: 54°21′06.66″N 18°39′23.34″E

St. John's Church
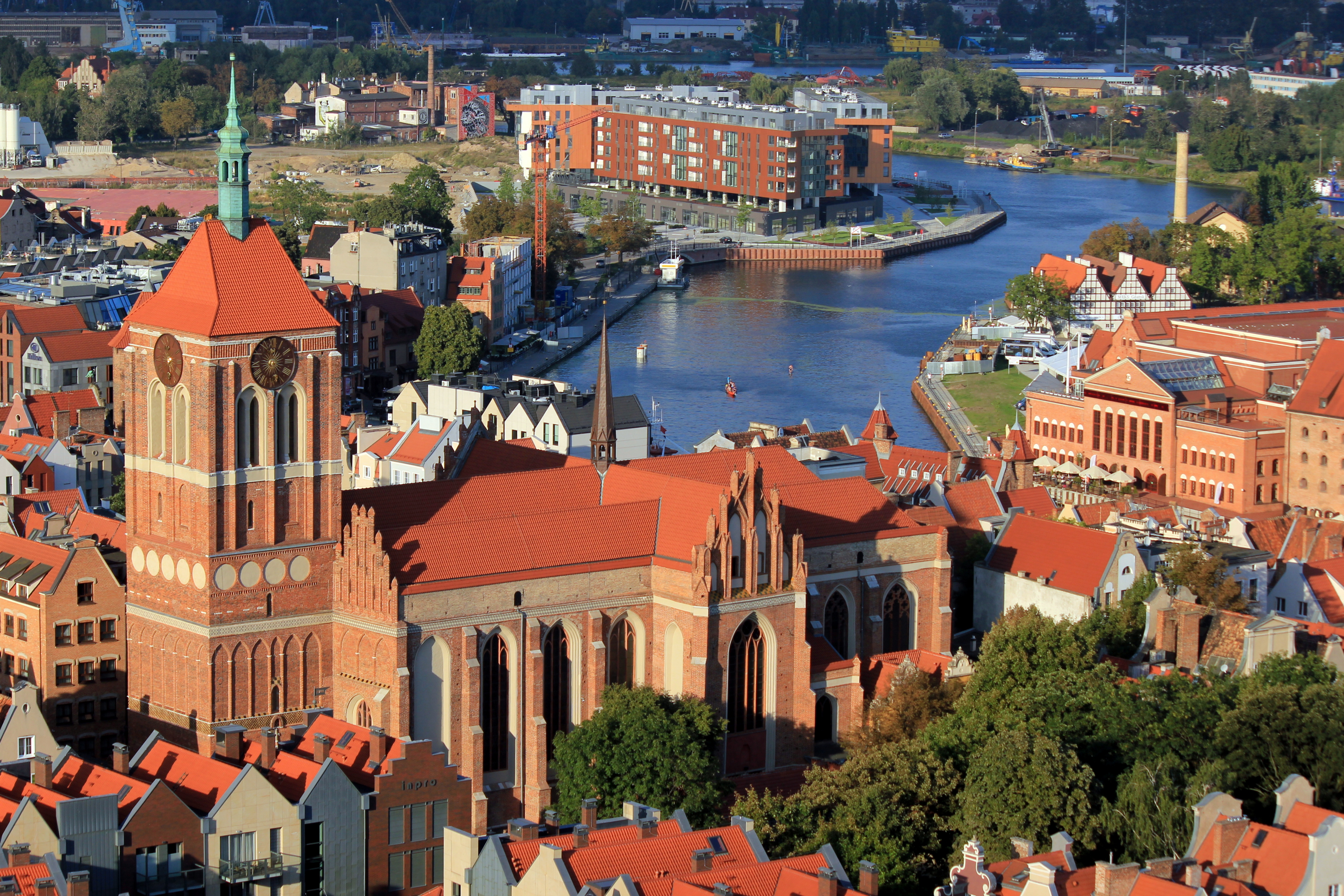
- The church in 2016
- St. John's Church
- Address: Świętojańska 50, Śródmieście, Gdańsk
- Country: Poland
- Denomination: Roman Catholic
- Website: Official website

Architecture
- Functional status: semi-active, multipurpose
- Architectural type: Hall church
- Style: Brick Gothic
- Years built: c. 1370–1465

Specifications
- Materials: Brick

Administration
- Archdiocese: Archdiocese of Gdańsk

St. John's Church (Polish: Kościół św. Jana; German: Johanneskirche) is a Brick Gothic church situated in the Old Town of Gdańsk, Poland. Formerly a place of worship for Roman Catholics and Lutherans, it now serves as a venue for mass and various secular events, exhibitions or concerts organised by the St. John's Centre, which is part of the Baltic Sea Cultural Centre initiative.

== History ==
The contemporary church stands on the remains of a chapel, the existence of which was first recorded in 1358. It is possible that the chapel was erected as early as 1349, as suggested by the street name which predates 1358. In the following years, a dispute emerged between the nearby parishes of St. Mary's and St. Catherine's regarding the administrative ownership of the building. In 1363, Knight Commander of the Teutonic Order, Giselbert von Dudulsheim, resolved the discord by assigning St. John's under the leadership of St. Catherine's Church.

The construction of the contemporary brick edifice commenced sometime around 1370, beginning with the eastern section. Simultaneously, the territory belonging to the future church was expanded for construction purposes and increased sevenfold. Since its inception, St. John's was of an architectural style that was commonly found in cities and towns of the Hanseatic League, around the Baltic Sea coast. The main body (naves) of the church was completed by the start of the 15th century, except for the tower. Since 1453, the Teutonic Knights restricted the height of all church and secular towers in proximity to their castle at the River Motława (Mottlau), in case of a ranged attack.

By the decision of Jan Gruszczyński, Bishop of Kuyavia, St. John's became its own parish church in 1456 when Danzig/Gdańsk turned to the Polish Crown during the Thirteen Years' War. The church and its ceiling vaults were completed by 1465, and the tower was raised in the aftermath of the war. However, it burned down in 1543. Under the Reformation, St. John's Church became a Lutheran place of worship in 1559 and its first pastor was Johann Hutzing from Frisia.

The church's surroundings severely impacted its mechanics and structural stability throughout its existence. Notably, the building's foundations became unstable and walls tilted due to the presence of groundwater and wet soil resulting from its closeness to the nearby river. In 1572, a part of the vaulted ceiling collapsed and similar issues were faced in 1679. In 1734, another fire destroyed the church's canopy; it allowed a small ridge turret to be placed on a new roof in 1737. More cracks and crevices were noticed on the ceiling in 1939, however, the outbreak of World War II delayed the repairs for a few years.

In March 1945, during the Soviet Red Army's advance into German-held Pomerania, the church burned down completely. The fire left an insecure and empty outer shell that was to be rebuilt. It was reconstructed in various phases from 1948. Following the war, the church was briefly utilised as a lapidarium – a storage facility for any noteworthy stone fragments that were excavated in the rubble of old Danzig, now Gdańsk.

In 1995, the building was lent by the Roman Catholic Archdiocese of Gdańsk to the Baltic Sea Cultural Centre (Nadbałtyckie Centrum Kultury) for 50 years. The initiative aims to finance any restoration work whilst using the church as a venue for public events or concerts.

== Architecture ==
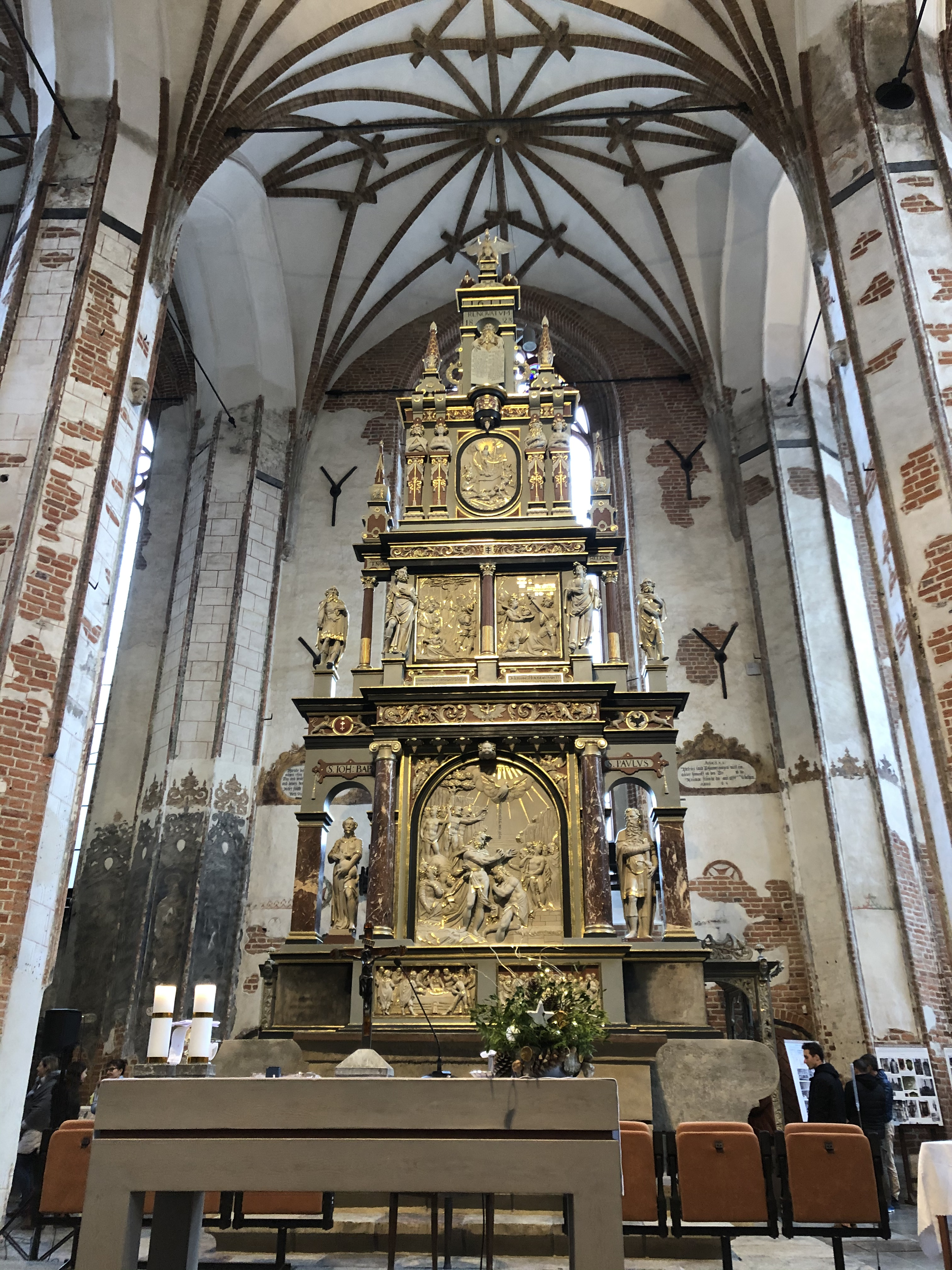
The Late Renaissance altarpiece, by Abraham van den Blocke

=== Exterior ===
St. John's is made of red brick and comprises three naves and a transept. It is a hall church oriented to the east with a Latin Cross Plan, a common feature among the churches in Gdańsk. The roof is covered with terracotta tiles, complimented by two ridge turrets. The first tower clock was installed in 1669; the current gilded piece is a reconstruction dating to 2012.

=== Interior ===
The interior is adorned by several ornamental altars, epitaphs and commemorative tablets of noble individuals, though their number is small and the overall inside appearance is bare due to wartime destruction and current purpose. Nonetheless, some of the city's most important altars are located at St. John's, which over the course of history had many patrons. For example, the artist Abraham van den Blocke created a monumental Late Renaissance altarpiece dedicated to John the Baptist, which was restored in the aftermath of World War II. The presbytery (chancel) also contains numerous medieval as well as Early Modern polychromes and inscriptions. Moreover, fragments and chippings of the original wall plastering have been preserved throughout the church. The ceiling comprises a lierne, also known as a stellar vault.

== Gallery ==
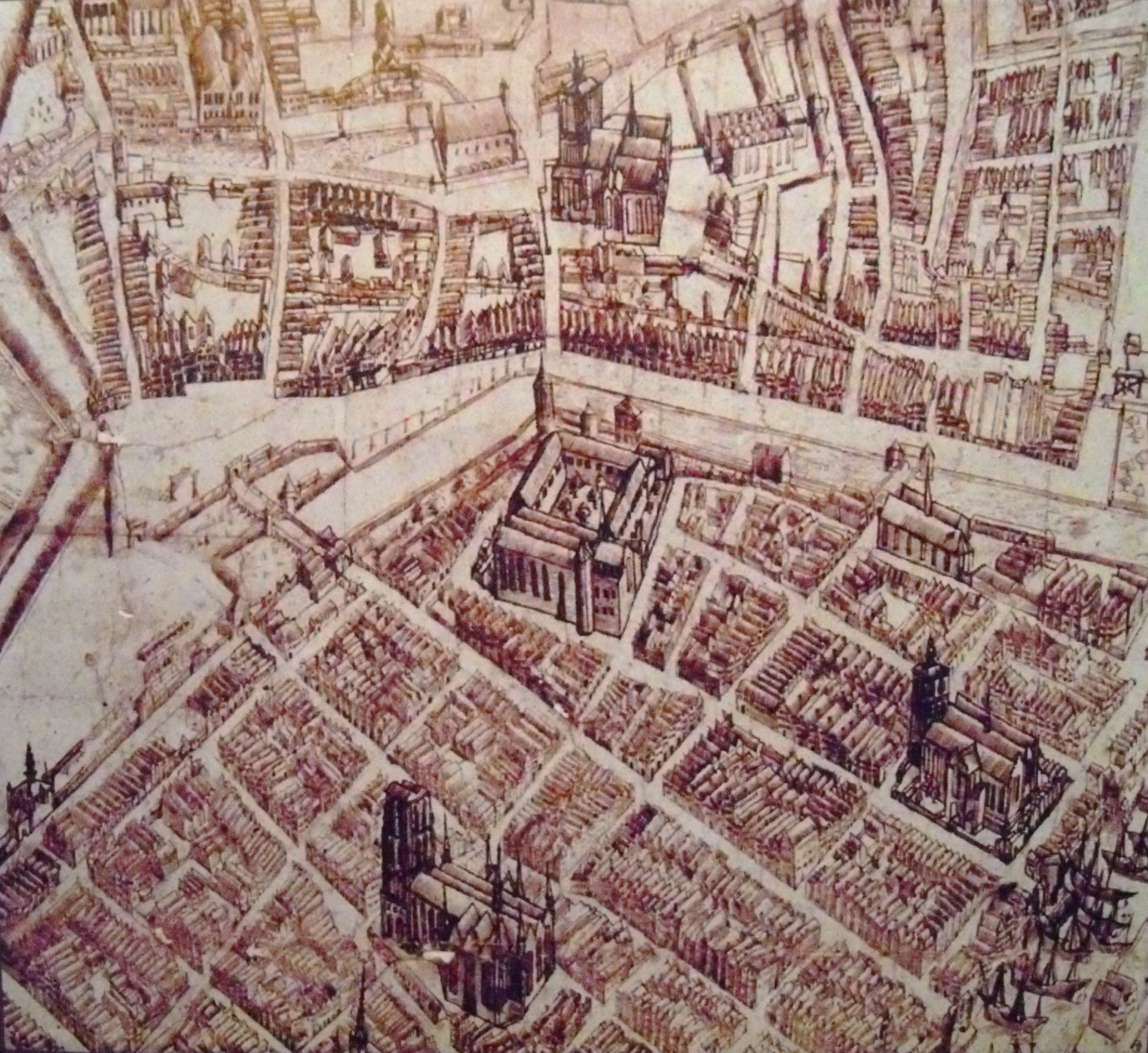
The church (far right) on a city plan from 1601.

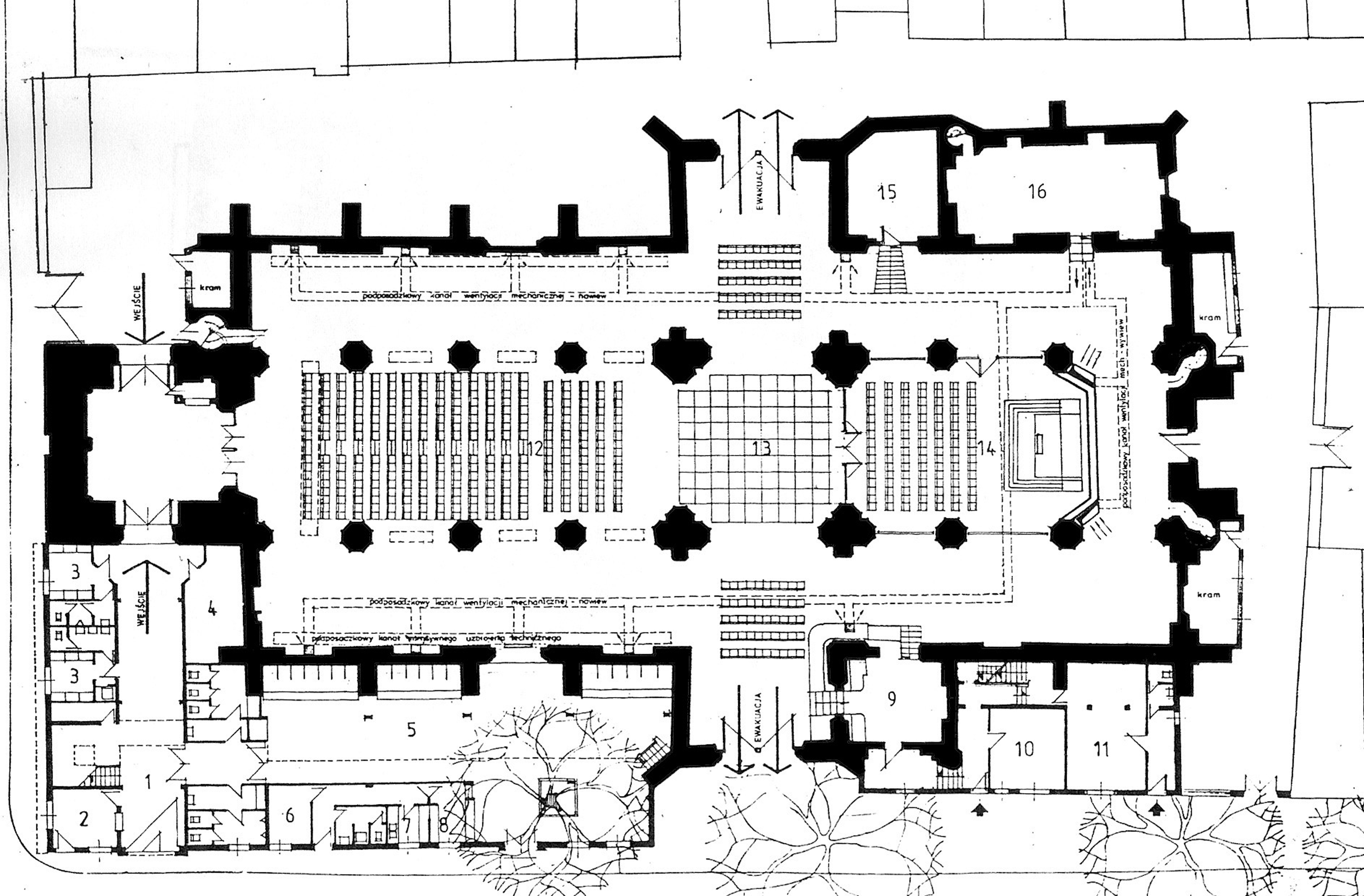
Floor plan of the church from 1994.

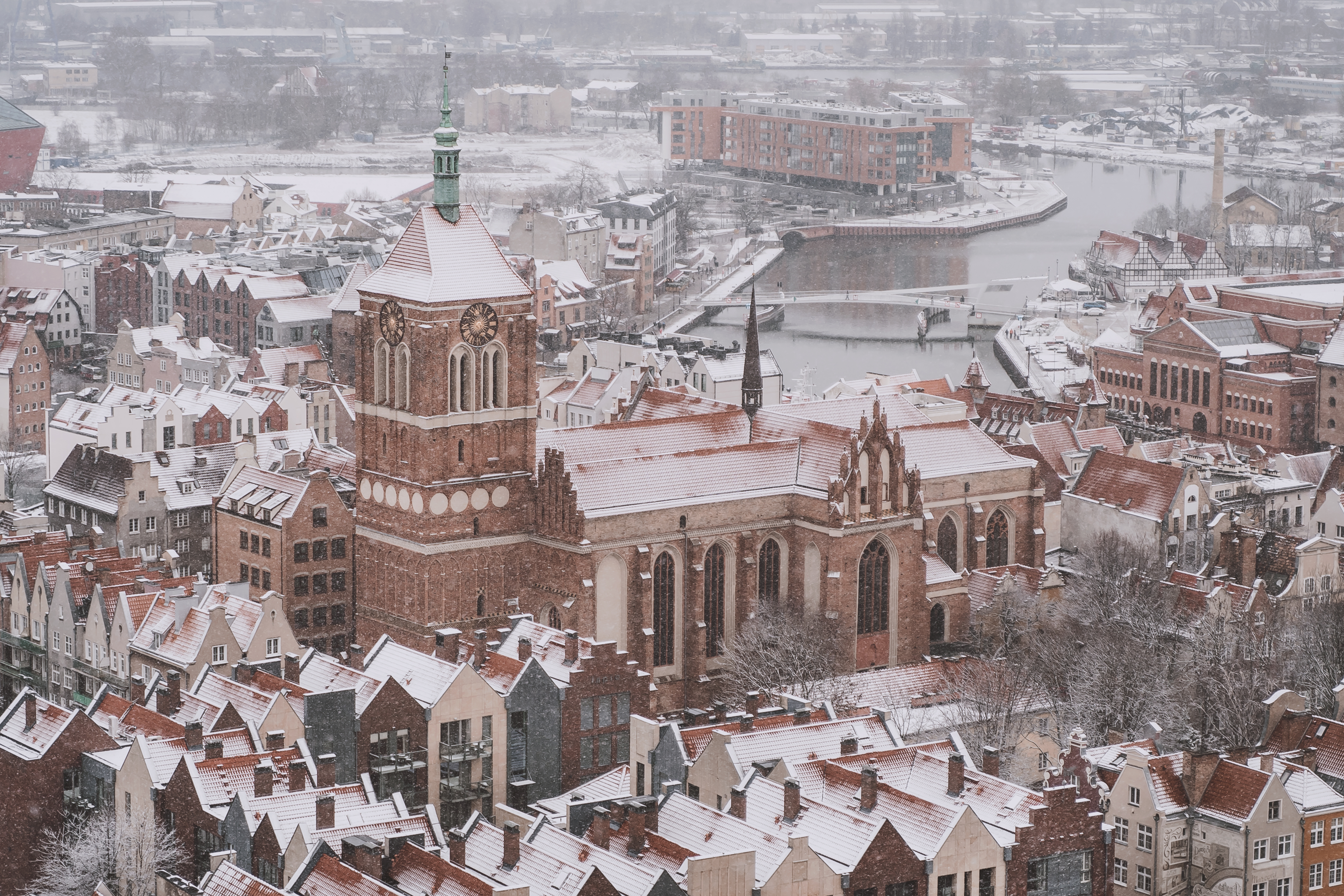
Winter view of the church and its surrounding, including riverside.

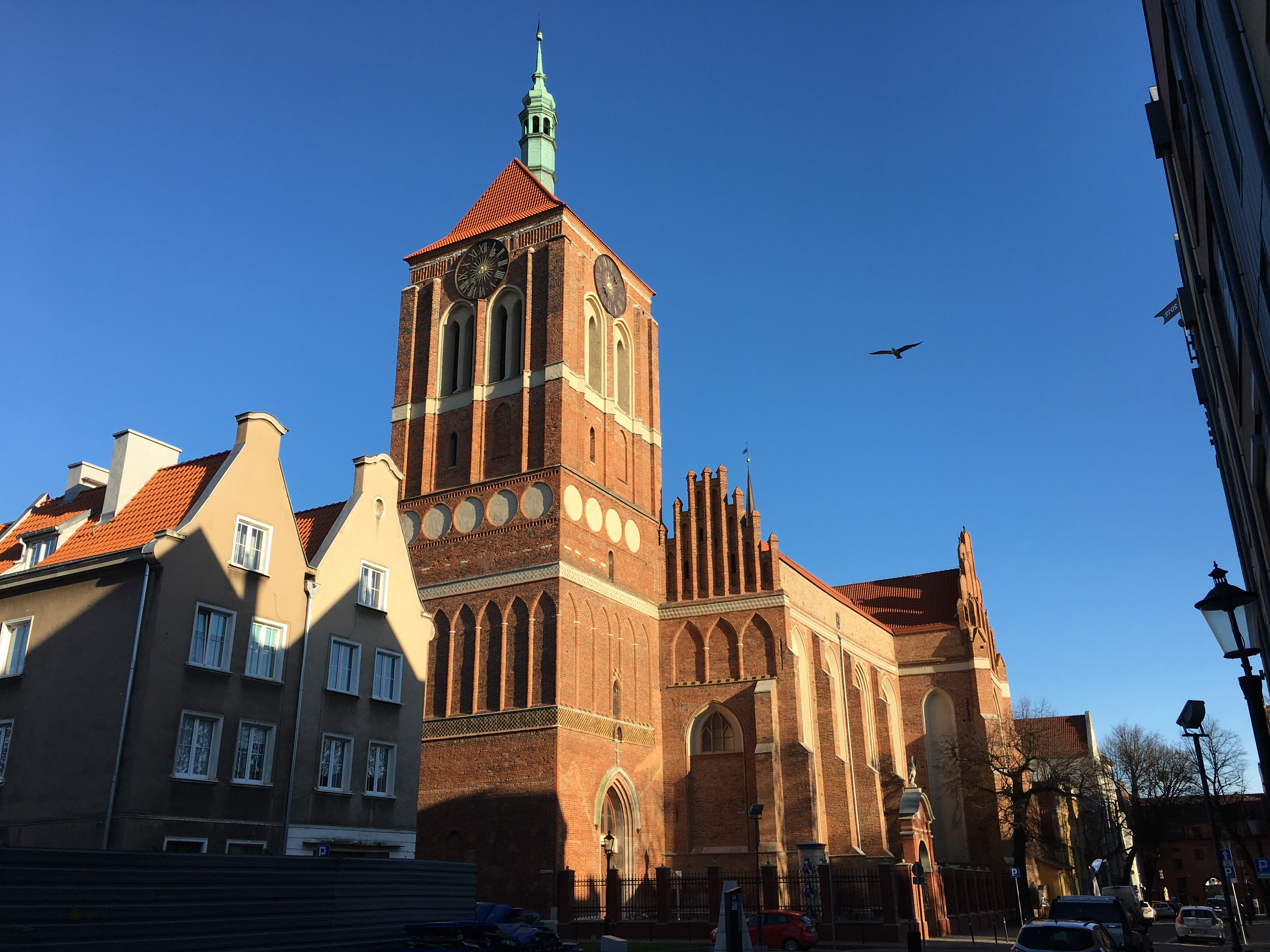
Front and side view, from the Old Town.

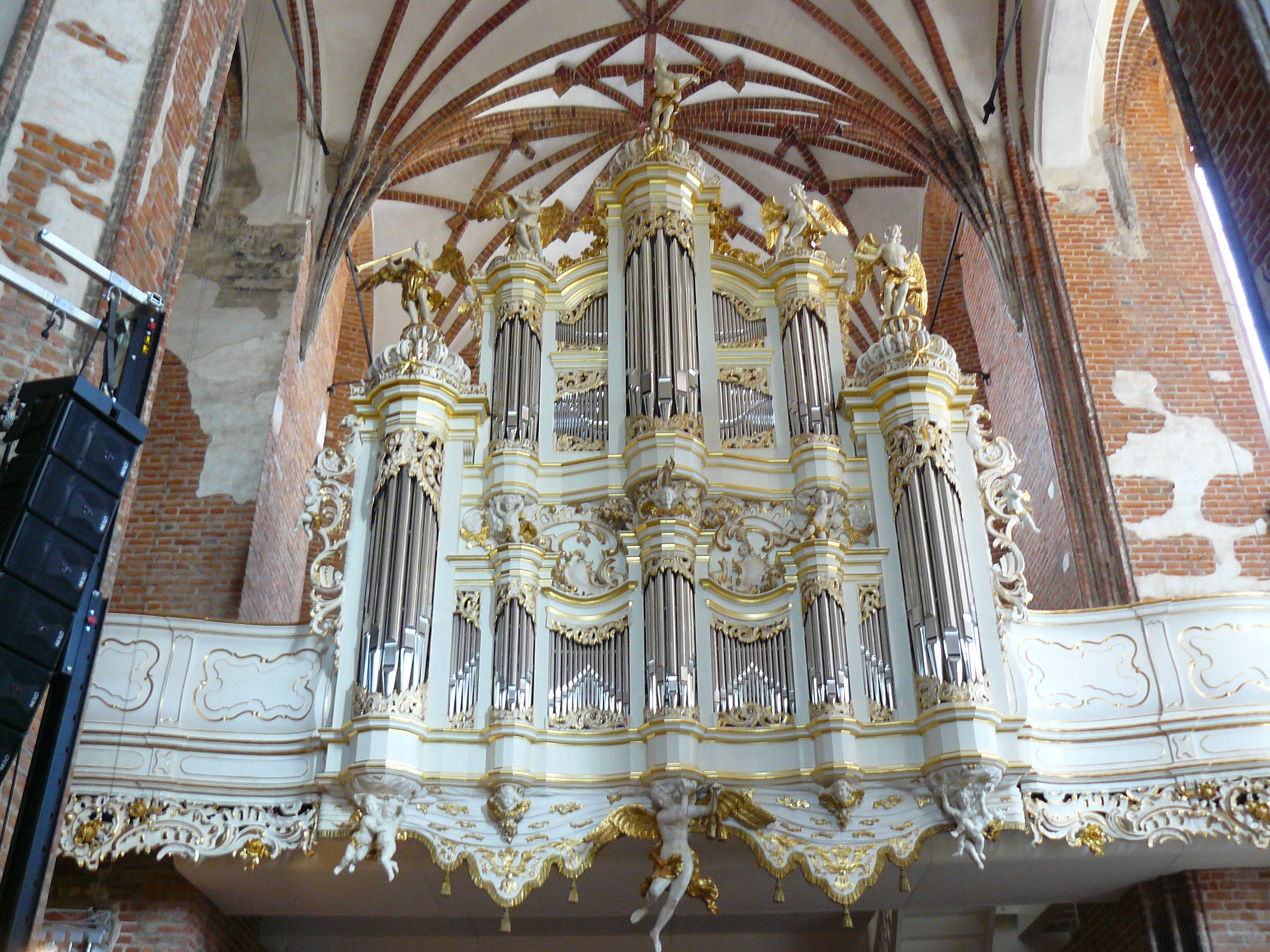
View of the reconstructed organ.

== See also ==
- St. Mary's Church – one of the largest brick churches in the world.
- Basilica of St. Nicholas – nearby parish church.

== Bibliography ==
=== Bibliography ===
- Antoniewicz, Grażyna (2012). "Gdańsk: W kościele św. Jana zakończono prace konserwatorskie. Odkryto średniowieczne freski". gdansk.naszemiasto.pl (in Polish). Gdańsk: Polska Press.
- Babnis, Krystyna (2014). "Kościół parafialny pw. św. Jana". zabytek.pl (in Polish). Narodowy Instytut Dziedzictwa.
- Bieniecki, Tytus (1969). Gdańsk, jego dzieje i kultura (in Polish). Warszawa (Warsaw): Arkady. OCLC 1019969861.
- Bukowski, Marcin (1966). Kościoły w Polsce odbudowane i wybudowane 1945-1965 (in Polish). Vol. 1. Warszawa (Warsaw): Ars Christiana. OCLC 224321390.
- Cieślak, Edmund (1985). Historia Gdańska (in Polish). Vol. 1. Gdańsk: Wydawnictwo Morskie. ISBN 9788321532639.
- Cieślak, Katarzyna (1992). Kościół-cmentarzem (in Polish). Gdańsk: Polska Akademia Nauk, Instytut Sztuki. ISBN 9788390032863.
- Dobrowolski, Tadeusz (1974). Sztuka polska od czasów najdawniejszych do ostatnich (in Polish). Kraków: Wydawn. Literackie. OCLC 1413139863.
- Gliński, Mirosław; Kukliński, Jerzy (1998). Kronika Gdańska: 997-1945 (in Polish). Gdańsk: Fundacja Rewaloryzacji Zabytków Gdańska. ISBN 9788390237565.
- Gradkowska, Małgorzata (2024). "Mamy wiatr do żeglowania, czyli hanzeatycka spuścizna Gdańska". zawszepomorze.pl (in Polish). Gdańsk: Fundacja A1 Press.
- Januszajtis, Andrzej (1968). Z uśmiechem przez Gdańsk (in Polish). Gdynia: Wyd. morskie. OCLC 250907544.
- Januszajtis, Andrzej (2013). "Zegary świętego Jana. Odmierzały i odmierzają w Gdańsku czas". portalpomorza.pl (in Polish). Tczew: Portal Pomorza.
- Labuda, Adam S. (1979). Malarstwo tablicowe w Gdańsku w 2 poł. XV w. (in Polish). Warszawa (Warsaw): Państ. Wydaw. Naukowy. OCLC 1437870255.
- Mrówczyńska, Izabela (2003). Rocznik Gdański (in Polish). Gdańsk: Gdańskie Towarzystwo Naukowe. ISBN 9788387359836.
- Redakcja (2012). "Gdańsk: W kościele św. Jana odsłonięto średniowieczne polichromie". dziennikbaltycki.pl (in Polish). Polska Press.
- Redakcja (2017). "Kościół św. Jana w Gdańsku". reformacja-pomorze.pl (in Polish). Komitet Obchodów 500-lecia Reformacji na Pomorzu.
- Redakcja (2024). "Historia Centrum św. Jana". nck.org.pl. Gdańsk: Nadbałtyckie Centrum Kultury. Samorząd Województwa Pomorskiego.
