= Blame It on the Summer =

2009 single by Basia

Single by Basia

from the album It's That Girl Again
- Released: June 1, 2009
- Genre: Jazz-pop; bossa nova
- Length: 4:28
- Label: Shanachie
- Songwriters: Danny White; Basia Trzetrzelewska; Andrew David Ross
- Producers: Danny White; Basia Trzetrzelewska

Basia singles chronology
"A Gift" (2009)	"Blame It on the Summer" (2009)	"I Must" (2009)

"Blame It on the Summer" is a song by Polish-born singer Basia from her 2009 album It's That Girl Again. It was written by Basia Trzetrzelewska, Danny White and Andrew David Ross, and produced by Danny and Basia. The singer has revealed that the lyrics are "about women getting restless during the summer". The song was the lead single from It's That Girl Again in the US, but the second single in Europe, following "A Gift".

== Track listing ==
- Download/Streaming
1. "Blame It on the Summer" – 4:28

== Charts ==
Chart (2009)	Peak position
US Billboard Smooth Jazz Songs	12
