= Matteo (song) =

Single by Basia

from the album Butterflies
- Released: April 6, 2018
- Genre: Jazz-pop; bossa nova
- Length: 3:40
- Label: Shanachie
- Songwriters: Giorgio Serci; Basia Trzetrzelewska
- Producers: Danny White; Basia Trzetrzelewska

Basia singles chronology
"Wandering" (2012)	"Matteo" (2018)	"Bubble" (2018)

Music video
- "Matteo" (Lyric Video) on YouTube

"Matteo" is a song by Polish-born singer Basia from her 2018 album Butterflies.

== Overview ==
"Matteo" is a mid-tempo bossa nova-influenced track, composed by Basia's guitarist, Giorgio Serci, and produced by Danny White and Basia. The song is based on an instrumental track called "Momentum" from Serci's 2009 album Silver Lining, recorded and released with Roberto Manzin. Encouraged to contribute the lyrics, Basia struggled for a lengthy period of time, but when Giorgio's son, named Matteo, was born, she decided to write the lyrics about him and dedicate the song to his parents. "Matteo" was first showcased online in March, and officially released on April 6, 2018 as the lead single from Butterflies.

== Track listing ==
- Download/Streaming
1. "Matteo" – 3:40

== Charts ==
Chart (2018)	Peak position
US Billboard Smooth Jazz Songs	20
