= Prime Time TV (song) =

Single by Basia

from the album Time and Tide
- Released: 1986
- Genre: Jazz-pop; sophisti-pop
- Length: 5:20 (album version); 3:27 (single edit)
- Label: Epic
- Songwriter(s): Basia Trzetrzelewska; Danny White; Peter Ross
- Producer(s): Danny White; Basia Trzetrzelewska

Basia singles chronology
"Prime Time TV" (1986)	"Run for Cover" (1986)

"Prime Time TV" is a song by Polish singer Basia released in 1986 as her debut solo single. It was included on her first album Time and Tide in 1987. The track was written by Basia, Danny White, and Peter Ross of Immaculate Fools, and produced by Danny and Basia.

== Music videos ==
The first music video for the song was filmed in 1987. It pictures Basia dancing and singing the song surrounded by suspended TV screens, with her face projected on them.

The second clip was filmed in March 1989 by Crescenzo Notarile and is a performance music video. It pictures Basia performing the song accompanied by full band and backup singers, with flickering TV screens in the background. This version was included on the VHS/LaserDisc release A New Day in 1990.

== Critical reception ==
Jerry Smith of the Music Week magazine considered "Prime Time TV" "a percussive dance track" and "a polished and memorable number", but similar to Matt Bianco's songs. Roger Morton of Record Mirror stated that Basia "sticks pretty close to the Bianco formula and comes up with a chirpy song which, parody or not, would be ideal as the theme for an American soap comedy", ironically adding that Matt Bianco's fans should buy it "in their tens... er, sorry, millions".

== Track listings ==
- 7" single

A. "Prime Time TV" – 3:27
B. "Freeze Thaw" (Instrumental) – 3:57

- 12" single

A. "Prime Time TV" (Extended Remix) – 5:39
B1. "Freeze Thaw" (Instrumental) – 3:57
B2. "Prime Time TV" – 3:27

- CD single
1. "Prime Time T.V." – 3:28
2. "Freeze Thaw" (Instrumental) – 3:57
3. "Prime Time T.V." (Extended Mix) – 5:38

== Charts ==
Chart (1986–87)	Peak position
Germany	68
UK Singles Chart (OCC)	88
