= Baby You're Mine =

Single by Basia

from the album London Warsaw New York
- Released: January 15, 1990
- Genre: Sophisti-pop; bossa nova
- Length: 3:34
- Label: Epic
- Songwriters: Basia Trzetrzelewska; Danny White
- Producers: Danny White; Basia Trzetrzelewska

Basia singles chronology
"Time and Tide" (1987)	"Baby You're Mine" (1990)	"Cruising for Bruising" (1990)

"Baby You're Mine" is a song by Polish singer Basia from her second studio album London Warsaw New York released in 1990. The track was written and produced by Basia Trzetrzelewska and Danny White, and is a mid-tempo bossa nova-influenced composition. It served as the first single from London Warsaw New York and was a minor chart success.

== Music video ==
The music video for "Baby You're Mine" was directed by Nick Morris and was intended to be a homage to Audrey Hepburn in Breakfast at Tiffany's. It pictures Basia wearing glamorous outfits, browsing a magazine on a sofa and performing dance routines surrounded by male dancers dressed in suits. The video was released on Basia's VHS/LaserDisc A New Day in 1990 and on a bonus DVD included in the special edition of her album It's That Girl Again in 2009.

== Critical reception ==
David Giles of Music Week deemed "Baby You're Mine" an "excellent song, which retains the Latin rhythms and sumptuous harmonies of before, but pushes the pop melody to the forefront". By contrast, Lisa Tilston of Record Mirror stated that "Basia has a lovely voice but... she wastes her talent on slush like this – electric organ-type backing and Copocabana lyrics". When reviewing the parent album, Nick Duerden of the same magazine underlined the song he deemed "pleasant in a hummable sort of way", but with "sickly lyrics".

== Track listings ==
- 7" single/CD single

A. "Baby You're Mine" – 3:34
B. "Masquerade" – 4:32

- 12" single/CD single

A. "Baby You're Mine" (Berimbau Mix) – 5:38
B1. "Masquerade" – 4:32
B2. "Promises" (Justin Strauss US Remix) – 4:00

- CD maxi single
1. "Baby You're Mine" – 3:36
2. "Masquerade" – 4:34
3. "Promises" (Justin Strauss US Remix) – 4:02
4. "Baby You're Mine" (Instrumental) – 3:36
- CD maxi single
1. "Baby You're Mine" – 3:36
2. "Run for Cover" (Extended Remix) – 5:30
3. "Copernicus" – 3:53
4. "Baby You're Mine" (Street Version) – 3:29

== Charts ==
=== Weekly charts ===
Weekly chart performance for "Baby You're Mine"
Chart (1990)	Peak position
Australia (ARIA)	161
Canada (RPM 100 Singles)	57
Canada (RPM Adult Contemporary)	5
France (SNEP)	45
Italy Airplay (Music & Media)	1
Quebec (ADISQ)	42
UK Singles (Official Charts)	84
US Billboard Adult Contemporary	18

=== Year-end charts ===
Year-end chart performance for "Baby You're Mine"
Chart (1990)	Peak position
Canada (RPM Adult Contemporary)	43
