= Time and Tide (Basia song) =

Single by Basia

from the album Time and Tide
- B-side: "Run for Cover"
- Released: 1987
- Genre: Jazz-pop; sophisti-pop
- Length: 4:00
- Label: Epic
- Songwriters: Basia Trzetrzelewska; Danny White
- Producers: Danny White; Basia Trzetrzelewska

Basia singles chronology
"New Day for You" (1987)	"Time and Tide" (1987)	"Baby You're Mine" (1990)

"Time and Tide" is a song by Polish singer Basia from her first solo album, Time and Tide, released in 1987. The song remains one of her biggest hits to date.

== Background ==
The track was written and produced by Basia Trzetrzelewska and Danny White. Basia wrote the lyrics about her and Danny's unfulfilled love, at the time when they both were in relationships with other partners. The song has become a staple at wedding receptions in America.

"Time and Tide" was released as the sixth and final single from Basia's debut album, also titled Time and Tide. It was a chart success in the USA where it became her first Top 40 hit on Billboard's Hot 100 and Adult Contemporary charts. Despite being Basia's biggest U.S. pop hit, the song was never remixed. In 1995, the single was re-released in Japan to promote the live album Basia on Broadway.

== Music video ==
The music video for the song was directed by Nick Morris. It shows Basia and her band rehearsing the song for a performance in an empty nightclub. At the song's climax, the setting changes as Basia finishes the song with the nightclub now occupied by an energetic audience. It was released on Basia's VHS/LaserDisc A New Day in 1990 and on a bonus DVD included in the special edition of her album It's That Girl Again in 2009.

== Track listings ==
- 7" single

A. "Time and Tide" – 4:00
B. "Run for Cover" – 3:36

- 12" single

A1. "Time and Tide" – 4:02
A2. "Forgive and Forget" – 3:13
B1. "Freeze Thaw" (Instrumental) – 3:56
B2. "Time and Tide" (Instrumental) – 4:02

- CD maxi single
1. "Time and Tide"
2. "Forgive and Forget"
3. "How Dare You"
4. "Time and Tide" (Instrumental)
- CD single (1995)
1. "Time and Tide" – 4:02
2. "More Fire Than Flame" – 4:14
3. "An Olive Tree" – 5:00

== Charts ==
Chart (1988)	Peak position
Canada (RPM 100 Singles)	94
UK Singles Chart (OCC)	61
US Billboard Hot 100	26
US Billboard Adult Contemporary	19
