= New Day for You =

Single by Basia

from the album Time and Tide
- Released: 1987
- Genre: Jazz-pop; sophisti-pop
- Length: 4:27
- Label: Epic
- Songwriter(s): Basia Trzetrzelewska; Danny White; Peter Ross
- Producer(s): Danny White; Basia Trzetrzelewska

Basia singles chronology
"Freeze Thaw" (1987)	"New Day for You" (1987)	"Time and Tide" (1987)

Music video
- "New Day for You" (Version 1) on YouTube

"New Day for You" is a song by Polish singer Basia from her debut album Time and Tide released in 1987.

== Overview ==
The track was written by Basia Trzetrzelewska, Danny White and Peter Ross of Immaculate Fools, and produced by Danny and Basia. The lyrics of the song were based on a poem that Ross had written for Basia's birthday, which she then incorporated into the track.

The song was particularly popular in Japan where it was used in an advert for a chain of department stores Parco. During the Apartheid era in South Africa, the song was adopted as a peace anthem.

== Music videos ==
The first music video for the song is a performance clip and was filmed in Royal Albert Hall in London. It pictures Basia and her band performing the song on stage in an empty concert hall.

The second version was filmed by Jon Small for the American market. It pictures Basia performing the song in front of a blue background, interspersed with footage of a solitary man wandering sadly around the city and watching other people. He eventually answers a public payphone and exclaims upon hearing an apparently good news. As he runs through the city streets, he passes by Basia who then turns around and smiles at him. This version was available on Basia's home video A New Day in 1990 and on a bonus DVD included in the special edition of her album It's That Girl Again in 2009.

== Critical reception ==
Jerry Smith of British magazine Music Week called "New Day for You" a "slick single", but deemed "in many ways too smooth and polished to make much impression".

== Track listings ==
- 7" single

A. "New Day for You" – 4:03
B. "Forgive and Forget" – 3:15

- 12" single

A. "New Day for You" (Extended Version) – 6:12
B1. "New Day for You" (Instrumental) – 4:56
B2. "Forgive and Forget" – 3:15

- 12" single

A. "New Day for You" (Extended Version)
B1. "Prime Time TV" (Extended Version)
B2. "Forgive and Forget"

- Cassette single
1. "New Day for You"
2. "Freeze Thaw" (Instrumental)

== Charts ==
Chart (1987–89)	Peak position
Australia (ARIA)	69
Netherlands (Single Top 100)	74
US Billboard Hot 100	53
US Billboard Adult Contemporary	5

== Cover versions ==
- Japanese singer Yōko Nagayama released her cover of the song in 1988.
