= Third Time Lucky (song) =

Single by Basia

from the album The Sweetest Illusion
- Released: 1994
- Genre: Jazz-pop; sophisti-pop
- Length: 5:01
- Label: Epic
- Songwriters: Basia Trzetrzelewska; Danny White
- Producers: Danny White; Basia Trzetrzelewska

Basia singles chronology
"Drunk on Love" (1994)	"Third Time Lucky" (1994)	"Half a Minute" (1995)

Music video
- "Third Time Lucky" on YouTube

"Third Time Lucky" is a song by Polish-born singer-songwriter Basia, released in 1994 by Epic Records as the fourth single from her third album, The Sweetest Illusion (1994). It was written and produced by Basia Trzetrzelewska and Danny White. The lyrics tell about drawing lessons from failed relationships and having hope for the next partner to be the ultimate.

"Third Time Lucky" also served as the final single from The Sweetest Illusion and was remixed by Johnny Vicious. The single was a minor success on the UK Singles Chart.

== Critical reception ==
The song received a positive review from the Music & Media magazine, which wrote that "the ex-Matt Bianco singer feels completely at ease with this sweet South American shuffle. With its acoustic guitars, soft percussion and carefree whistling, it is the perfect programming material for ACE stations." Alan Jones from Music Week commented, "More South American rhythms from the Polish-born ex-Matt Bianco singer, who is big in America and sings somewhat like Gloria Estefan. It's annoyingly catchy, but maybe too twee."

== Music video ==
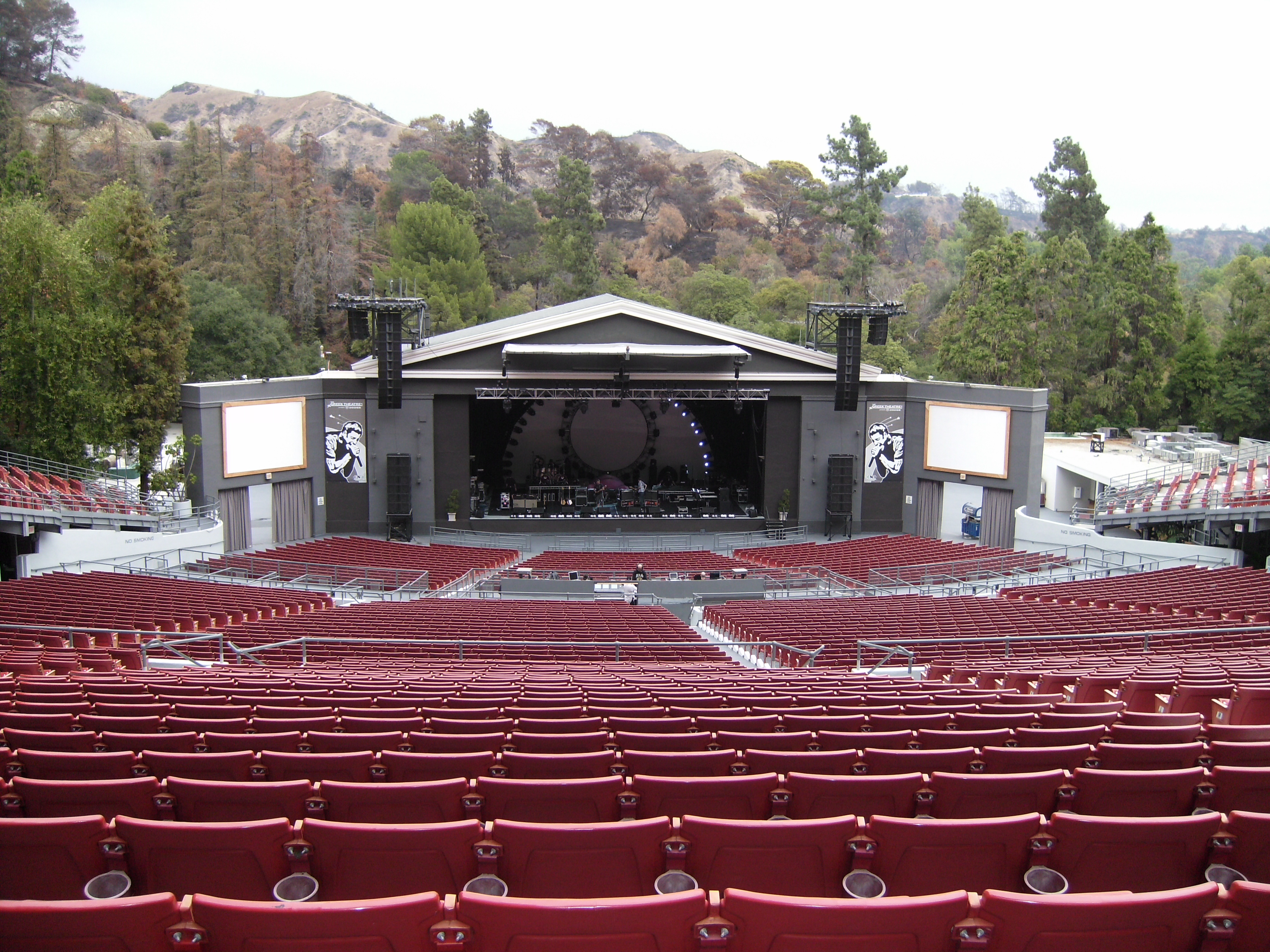
Greek Theatre, Los Angeles, where the music video was filmed

The accompanying music video for the song was directed by British director Nick Morris. It was filmed in Los Angeles, California during rehearsals and the performance at the Greek Theatre in July 1994. The clip also includes footage of streets of Los Angeles. In 2009, the video was released on a bonus DVD included in the special edition of Basia's album It's That Girl Again.

== Track listings ==
- CD single
1. "Third Time Lucky" (Radio Edit) – 3:56
2. "Third Time Lucky" (Instrumental) – 4:11
3. "Drunk on Love" (Extended Dance Mix) – 7:50
- CD single
1. "Third Time Lucky" (Radio Edit) – 3:55
2. "Drunk on Love" (Extended Dance Mix) – 7:45
3. "Until You Come Back to Me" – 3:54
4. "Third Time Lucky" (Instrumental) – 4:07
- 12" single

A. "Third Time Lucky" (Vokal Mix) – 9:45
B1. "Drunk on Love" (Roger's Ultimate Anthem Mix) – 8:51
B1. "Drunk on Love" (Hands in the Air Dub) – 5:56

- Cassette single

A. "Third Time Lucky" (Radio Edit) – 3:55
B. "Third Time Lucky" (Instrumental) – 4:07

== Charts ==
Chart (1994)	Peak position
UK Singles (OCC)	77
