= The Sweetest Illusion =

1994 studio album by Basia

Studio album by Basia
- Released: 28 April 1994
- Genres: Jazz-pop; sophisti-pop
- Length: 52:46
- Label: Epic
- Producers: Danny White; Basia Trzetrzelewska

Basia chronology
Brave New Hope (1991)	The Sweetest Illusion (1994)	Basia on Broadway (1995)

Professional ratings
Review scores
Source	Rating
AllMusic	3/5 stars
Billboard	(positive)
JazzTimes	(positive)
Music Week	3/5 stars
Record Collector	3/5 stars
Sound of the Crowd	4/10 stars

The Sweetest Illusion is the third solo studio album by Polish singer-songwriter Basia, released on 28 April 1994 by Epic Records. The record spawned the hit "Drunk on Love".

== Overview ==
The album took two and a half years to make. It was primarily recorded at Whitfield Street Recording Studios in London, apart from piano parts, which were recorded at London's Westside Studios. The material was mastered at Sony Music Studios in New York. Contrarily to Basia's previous albums, The Sweetest Illusion moves away from electronically generated music towards traditional live instruments. Basia dedicated this album "to her family and compatriots in Poland as well as those scattered around the world". Two songs on the album incorporate Polish language: in "An Olive Tree" Basia sings: "Oliwkowe drzewo może spełnić twe marzenia" (English: "An olive tree can make your dreams come true") and towards the end of "Yearning", she sings the opening line from a Polish folk song: "Szła dzieweczka do laseczka, do zielonego". The latter was described by Basia as the song she is most proud of and the best she has ever written. Its lyrics are about "missing home" and to emphasize this feeling, the track includes whale vocalization, which was Danny's idea.

"More Fire Than Flame" was released as Japan-only single on 27 October 1993. In mid-April 1994, the ballad "Yearning" was serviced to contemporary jazz stations as the first US single, although in other territories it was released as the album's final single in late 1994. The track was accompanied by a music video directed by Howard Greenhalgh, in which Basia and her two nieces appeared in Polish folk costumes. The song failed to chart, but entered the Tokio Hot 100 list on Japanese radio station J-Wave. "Drunk on Love" was released as the next single in June 1994 and topped Billboard's Dance Club Songs. It was followed by "Third Time Lucky" later in 1994.

The album was met with particular commercial success in Japan where it became Basia's biggest-selling album and her only platinum record there. In the United States though, The Sweetest Illusion did not repeat the success of the two previous albums, nonetheless, it was certified gold by the Recording Industry Association of America in December 1994 for sales in excess of 500,000 units. It was her final major-label full-length studio album. In 2016, the album was re-released by independent UK label Cherry Red Records as three-CD deluxe edition featuring instrumental versions and remixes.

== Track listing ==
All songs written by Basia Trzetrzelewska and Danny White, except where noted.

1. "Drunk on Love" (Trzetrzelewska, White, Peter Ross) – 4:46
2. "Third Time Lucky" – 5:01
3. "Yearning" – 5:22
4. "She Deserves It/Rachel's Wedding" (featuring Trey Lorenz) – 4:52
5. "An Olive Tree" (Kevin Robinson, Trzetrzelewska, White) – 5:01
6. "The Sweetest Illusion" (Trzetrzelewska, White, Ross) – 4:58
7. "Perfect Mother" – 3:50
8. "More Fire Than Flame" (Trzetrzelewska, White, Ross) – 4:13
9. "Simple Pleasures" – 4:53
10. "My Cruel Ways" – 4:54
11. "The Prayer of a Happy Housewife" – 4:56

== Personnel ==
=== Musicians ===
- Basia Trzetrzelewska – lead vocals, backing vocals (3, 11), crowd vocals (5)
- Danny White – keyboards, whistling (2), crowd vocals (5)
- Peter White – guitars (1, 2, 4–11), acoustic guitar (3), accordion (4, 7)
- Andy Ross – electric guitar (3), mandolin (4, 10), bandurria (4), guitars (6, 10, 11)
- Julian Crampton – bass (1, 3, 6, 9, 11), double bass (4)
- Andres Lafone – bass (2, 5, 7)
- Randy Hope-Taylor – bass (8, 10)
- Andy Gangadeen – drums, triangle (6), shaker (7)
- Karl Vanden Bossche – percussion (1–3, 5, 7–11), wind chimes (4)
- Bosco De Oliveira – percussion (2, 7), shaker (4)
- Patrick Clahar – saxophone (2, 6), alto saxophone (5), tenor saxophone (5)
- Chris DeMargary – baritone saxophone (5), flute (11), alto flute (11)
- Steve Gregory – saxophone (10)
- Fayyaz Virji – trombone (2, 5, 8–10)
- Kevin Robinson – trumpet (1, 2, 5, 6, 8), flugelhorn (2, 5, 9–11), crowd vocals (5), French horn (9)
- Nick Ingman – string arrangements (3, 10)
- Gavyn Wright – strings leader (3, 6, 10), violin (4)
- Mark Anthoni – backing vocals (3, 11), crowd vocals (5)
- Trey Lorenz – lead and backing vocals (4)

=== Technical ===
- Produced and arranged by Basia Trzetrzelewska and Danny White
- Recorded by Mark Chamberlain
- Assistant recording – Jason Scott Westbrook
- Pianos recorded by Paul Mortimer, assisted by Lee Phillips
- Mixed by David Bascombe
- Mastered by Vlado Meller
- Design and artwork – Bill Smith Studio, London
- Paintings – Halina Tymusz
- Photography – Paul Cox
- Management – Dee Anthony
- Make-up – Helen Whiting

== Charts ==
=== Weekly charts ===
Weekly chart performance for The Sweetest Illusion
Chart (1994)	Peak position
French Albums (IFOP)	39
Japanese Albums (Oricon)	6
UK Jazz & Blues Albums (Official Charts)	7
US Billboard 200	27

=== Year-end charts ===
Year-end chart performance for The Sweetest Illusion
Chart (1994)	Position
Japanese Albums (Oricon)	86

== Certifications ==
Certifications for The Sweetest Illusion
Region	Certification	Certified units/sales
Japan (RIAJ)	Platinum	200,000^{^}
United States (RIAA)	Gold	500,000^{^}
^{^} Shipments figures based on certification alone.

== Release history ==
Release dates and formats for The Sweetest Illusion
Region	Date	Format	Label	Ref.
Japan	28 April 1994	CD	Epic	
United States	3 May 1994	CD; LP; cassette	Epic	
Various	25 November 2016	3-CD deluxe edition	Cherry Red	
