= Basia =

Polish singer-songwriter (born 1954)

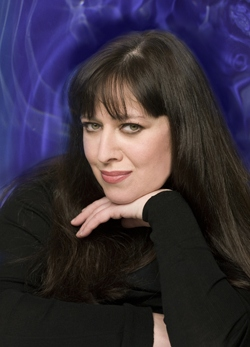
- Basia in 2011

Background information
- Born: Barbara Stanisława Trzetrzelewska; 30 September 1954 (age 72); Jaworzno, Stalinogród Voivodeship, Poland
- Genres: Pop; jazz-pop; sophisti-pop; bossa nova; samba; soul; swing
- Occupation: Singer-songwriter
- Years active: 1969–present
- Labels: Epic; eOne; Shanachie
- Website: basiasongs.com

Barbara Stanisława "Basia" Trzetrzelewska (Polish: [ˈbaɕa tʂɛtʂɛˈlɛfska]; born 30 September 1954), better known mononymously as Basia, is a Polish singer-songwriter and recording artist noted for her Latin-inspired jazz-pop music.

She began singing professionally in various Polish bands beginning in the late 1960s and during the 1970s, then moved to the UK in 1981. She rose to fame as a singer in the British trio Matt Bianco. By 1986, Basia and her bandmate Danny White left the group to focus on her solo career.

She signed with Epic Records and enjoyed a successful international career from 1987 until 1995, particularly in the US, where her first two albums Time and Tide and London Warsaw New York both sold more than a million copies. Her biggest hits include "Time and Tide", "New Day for You", "Promises", "Baby You're Mine", "Cruising for Bruising", and "Drunk on Love". She also developed a following in Asia.

She took a lengthy hiatus due to personal tragedies. She made a comeback to regular recording and performing beginning with the release of the Matt Bianco reunion album Matt's Mood in 2004. She releases her music through independent labels.

== Education and career ==
=== 1954–1984: Early life and career ===
Basia was born in Jaworzno, Poland on 30 September 1954. She had three siblings–two brothers and a sister–and her parents ran a popular ice cream parlor in the town's centre. Growing up in a musical household, Basia enjoyed singing from an early age and had an extensive collection of vinyl records. Her mother played piano and gave her first music lessons.

In 1969, Basia performed as a vocalist in a local band, Astry, appearing with them at the National Festival of Beat Avangarde in Kalisz where they won. Always good at exact sciences, Basia had intended to study mathematics at the Jagiellonian University, in Kraków but eventually took up physics. During her first year at university, Alibabki, a popular Polish all-female band asked her to join the group. Basia accepted the offer in 1972, dropped out of university, and toured with them in Poland and abroad, mostly in Eastern Bloc countries, until 1974. In 1976, Basia took part in the National Festival of Polish Song in Opole as a soloist to no success. From 1977 to 1979, she performed in Polish rock band Perfect.

Moving to London with her partner in January 1981, Basia recorded demo tracks for various artists. She met Danny White (brother of jazz guitarist Peter White) there and his collaborator Mark Reilly by answering their ad in Melody Maker. The trio performed in 1983 as Bronze, but later changed the name to Matt Bianco. Their debut album Whose Side Are You On? was released in 1984 and turned out to be a hit in Europe. It spawned Matt Bianco's UK Top 40 singles "Get Out of Your Lazy Bed" and "Half a Minute".

=== 1985–1999: Solo career ===
Despite the success, Basia and Danny White left Matt Bianco in 1985 to focus on Basia's solo career, marking the beginning of a long-term collaboration. Their first release was the single "Prime Time TV" in 1986, a minor success in the UK and Germany. Basia's first solo album, Time and Tide, was released in 1987, selling well in France but performing poorly in the rest of Europe. Accompanying singles "New Day for You" and "Promises" were also only modest successes. The album fared much better in the US where it found popularity on smooth jazz radio stations. The song "Time and Tide" was Basia's first hit on Billboard Hot 100, peaking at No. 26 in 1988, followed by "New Day for You" and "Promises", both reaching the top 10 on the Adult Contemporary chart in 1989. The album was certified platinum by the Recording Industry Association of America in November 1989 selling one million copies in the US alone. Worldwide, it sold almost two million copies.

The second album, London Warsaw New York, recorded in 1989 and released in early 1990, was promoted by the popular singles "Baby You're Mine" and "Cruising for Bruising". The latter peaked in the top 40 on both US and Canadian singles chart. The album also included the cover of Stevie Wonder-penned track "Until You Come Back to Me", a minor hit on the Adult Contemporary chart. London Warsaw New York was another commercial success, selling more than two million units worldwide including more than one million in the US, earning Basia her second American platinum certification. It also became Billboard's Contemporary Jazz Album of 1990. The album was a strong seller in Japan which at that point had become Basia's number two market. The LP was supported by an extensive tour spanning the US, Europe, and Japan. Seeing Basia's success, her label released Brave New Hope, a compilation consisting of remixes and rare tracks. Her third studio album, The Sweetest Illusion, was released in spring 1994. Mixed by David Bascombe, the project marked the end of a ten-year working relationship with mixmaster Phil Harding. The Sweetest Illusion included a number-one hit on the Billboard Dance Club Songs chart, "Drunk on Love", and the moderately successful song "Third Time Lucky". Although less successful than Basia's two previous albums, it reached the top 40 on the US charts and received gold certification from the RIAA for selling over half a million copies. In Japan it peaked in the top 10, receiving a platinum sales award, her greatest achievement there. To support The Sweetest Illusion, Basia again embarked on a long tour in the US, Japan and Europe. On the tour, she played her first ever solo concerts in Poland. She recorded a 16-song live album, Basia on Broadway during the New York City leg of that tour.

In 1996, Basia contributed vocals to Peter White's song "Just Another Day" which was released as a single from his album Caravan of Dreams. A retrospective compilation album, Clear Horizon – The Best of Basia, came out in 1998 consisting of notable chart hits, non-single tracks, and new material including a cover of "Waters of March", written by Brazilian composer Antônio Carlos Jobim. The compilation was Basia's last release for Sony and was a minor success only in Japan, largely due to lack of promotion from the label.

=== 2000–present: Hiatus and comeback ===
Basia withdrew from the music industry when her mother, with whom she was very close, died in December 2000. Not long after that, her cousin died in a car accident and that was followed by the passing of other close friends. The singer struggled with depression, lost motivation to work, and thought she would never return to singing. After some persistent efforts from Danny White and Mark Reilly, who had started working together again, she agreed to join a re-formed Matt Bianco. The band released the album Matt's Mood in 2004 to critical acclaim and modest chart success. The positive response to Matt Bianco's reunion and pleas from her fans encouraged Basia to work on her next solo album. Having finished touring with the band in 2006, Basia and White began working on the new material together while Reilly performed with Matt Bianco.

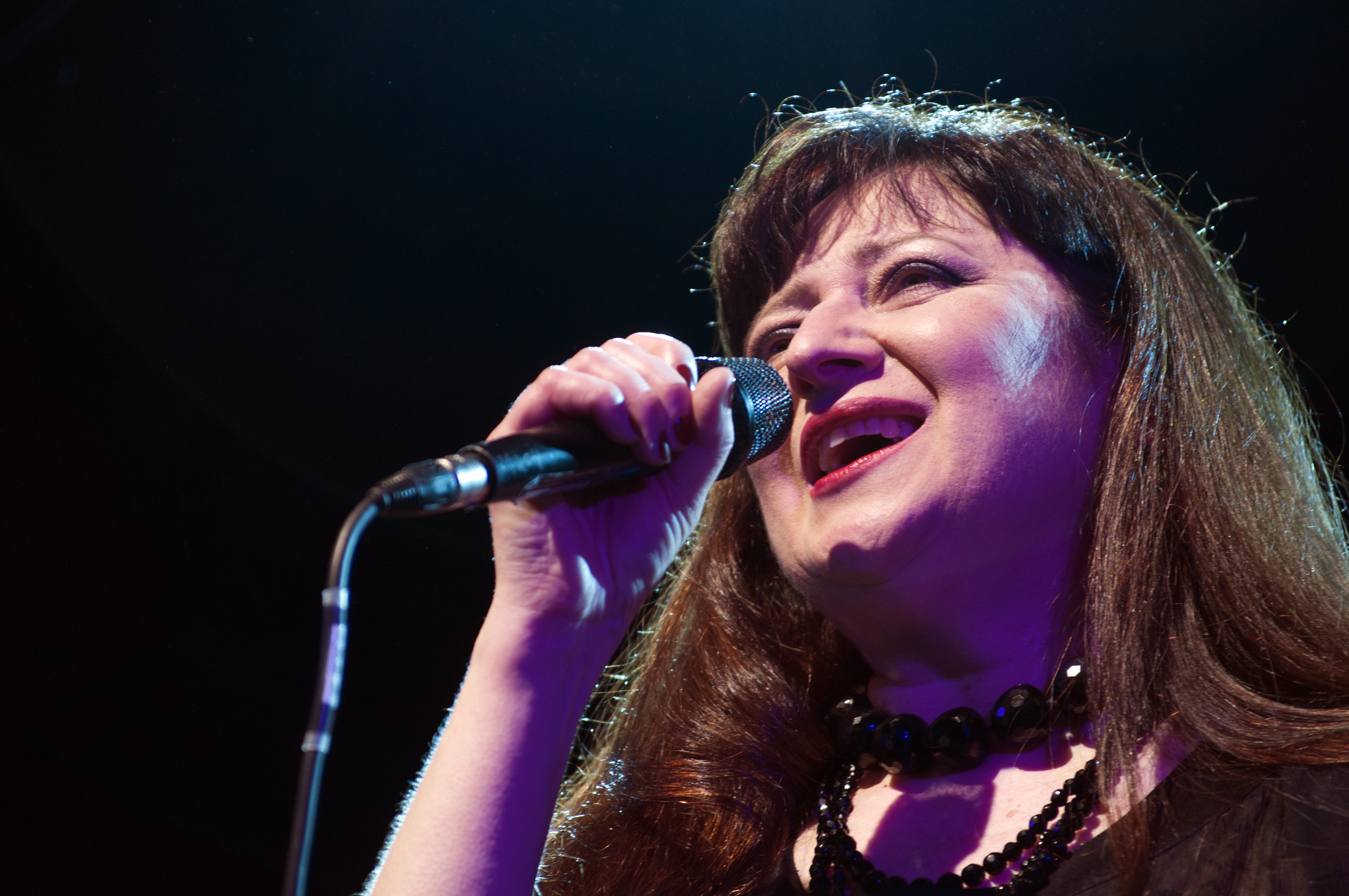
Basia performing at an event at St. John's Church in Gdańsk, Poland, June 2011

Her fourth solo studio album, It's That Girl Again, was finally released in spring 2009 by independent label Koch Records. It was promoted by the ballad "A Gift" on the Polish radio while "Blame It on the Summer" served as the lead single on the American market. The album met with critical as well as commercial success, placing in the top 10 of the US Jazz Albums chart and the top 5 in her native Poland where it was certified platinum. Basia toured extensively in Europe, east Asia, and North America to promote It's That Girl Again. A 2011 concert in Łódź, Poland was recorded for her second live album, From Newport to London: Greatest Hits Live... and More, released in fall 2011. The album featured three studio recordings including the title song, released as the lead single, and "Wandering", a duet with Polish singer Mietek Szcześniak. They recorded one more song together, a cover of Vanessa Williams' hit "Save the Best for Last", produced by its original co-writer Wendy Waldman, this time for Szcześniak's album Signs. In March 2013, Basia performed a full show at the Java Jazz Festival in Jakarta, Indonesia.

Basia recorded duets with Polish artists Monika Lidke and the band Pectus for their respective albums, simultaneously working on the new solo album. In 2014, she was given the Commander's Cross of Polonia Restituta for promoting Polish culture worldwide and in 2015, she received the Medal for Merit to Culture – Gloria Artis. Her fifth solo studio album, Butterflies, was released in May 2018, preceded by the single "Matteo". It received positive reviews and charted in the top 5 on the Jazz Albums chart in the US, and the top 20 in Poland. The accompanying concert tour spanned the US, Poland and East Asia. In November 2019, Basia was honoured with the Kosciuszko Foundation Pioneer Award. In 2021, she was featured on the single "Fire & Ice" by The Clarisse Sisters.

== Influences and artistry ==
Basia's music incorporates soul and jazz, as well as Latin American music, particularly Brazilian bossa nova and samba. She has cited Aretha Franklin, Stevie Wonder, Burt Bacharach, Astrud Gilberto, and Antônio Carlos Jobim as being among her musical influences.

Basia is noted for having a vocal range of approximately three octaves. She has also incorporated Polish elements into her songs which are otherwise English. Her native language can be heard in "Copernicus" and "Reward" from London Warsaw New York; in the album Matt's Mood; as well as in "An Olive Tree" and "Yearning" from The Sweetest Illusion. She has also released two songs performed entirely in Polish: the concert album Basia on Broadway features a live recording of "Dzień się budzi" (English: "The Day Is Dawning"), and It's That Girl Again has "Amelki śmiech" ("Amelka's Laughter").

== Personal life ==
Basia has one son, Mikołaj, born in the late 1970s. At the time, her partner was John, a social worker from England living in Chicago. They then went to the UK. In the second half of the 1980s, she and her musical collaborator Danny White dated. Since 1991, Basia's partner has been musician Kevin Robinson, a member of Simply Red, with whom she lives in a London suburb. Basia also maintains a house in her Polish hometown Jaworzno and divides her time between the two countries. She holds dual Polish and British citizenship.

Basia is an avid lover of architecture which she calls her "unfulfilled passion".

== Discography ==
- 1987: Time and Tide
- 1990: London Warsaw New York
- 1994: The Sweetest Illusion
- 1995: Basia on Broadway
- 1998: Clear Horizon – The Best of Basia
- 2009: It's That Girl Again
- 2011: From Newport to London: Greatest Hits Live ... and More
- 2018: Butterflies

== See also ==
- List of notable Polish people
