= Matt's Mood =

- North American cover

Studio album by Matt Bianco
- Released: 8 June 2004
- Genre: Pop, jazz, soul
- Length: 44:10
- Label: EmArcy, Universal
- Producer: Danny White, Mark Reilly, Basia Trzetrzelewska

Matt Bianco chronology
Echoes (2002)	Matt's Mood (2004)	Hifi Bossanova (2009)

Professional ratings
Review scores
Source	Rating
AllMusic	3/5 stars
Billboard	Favourable
Codzienna Gazeta Muzyczna	4/5 stars
Gazeta Wyborcza	Favourable

Matt's Mood is the tenth studio album by the British band Matt Bianco, released in 2004 by Universal and distributed by the EmArcy label.

== Overview ==
The album was a reunion of the original Matt Bianco line-up, with keyboardist Danny White and vocalist Basia Trzetrzelewska rejoining lead vocalist Mark Reilly, the only one constant member since 1983. Matt's Mood marked 20 years since the release of their first album together, 1984's Whose Side Are You On?. In North America, the album was released in 2005 with a different cover and was marketed as Matt Bianco featuring Basia.

"Ordinary Day" was released as the lead single, followed by "La Luna". The third and final single was "Ronnie's Samba", a collage of material by the late baritone saxophonist Ronnie Ross who also played on early Matt Bianco material. The group received permission from Ross' family to utilize some old recordings of Ross' sax playing and weave them into an entirely new composition.

Basia and Danny left the band again shortly after the end of the promotional world tour to revitalise Basia's solo career.

== Critical reception ==
Matt's Mood received positive feedback from music critics. Billboard praised its "sophisticated, polished songs that pull from the worlds of pop, soul, jazz and world music (particularly Brazilian)", and for "seductive melodies and spirited grooves". Polish magazine Gazeta Wyborcza complimented on the album's "beautiful melodies and slick lyrics".

== Track listing ==
All tracks written by Danny White, Mark Reilly and Basia Trzetrzelewska.

1. "Ordinary Day" – 4:38
2. "I Never Meant to" – 4:52
3. "Wrong Side of the Street" – 4:04
4. "La Luna" – 4:04
5. "Say the Words" – 3:42
6. "Golden Days" – 4:21
7. "Ronnie's Samba" – 4:11
8. "Kaleidoscope" – 4:25
9. "Slip & Sliding" – 4:20
10. "Matt's Mood III" – 5:33

== Charts ==
Chart (2004–2005)	Peak position
Dutch Albums (Album Top 100)	91
German Albums (Offizielle Top 100)	83
Italian Albums (FIMI)	68
Polish Albums (ZPAV)	10
UK Jazz & Blues Albums (OCC)	28
US Top Contemporary Jazz Albums (Billboard)	8
