= Drunk on Love =

Single by Basia

from the album The Sweetest Illusion
- Released: 1994
- Genre: Acid jazz; dance-pop
- Length: 4:06
- Label: Epic
- Songwriters: Basia Trzetrzelewska; Danny White; Peter Ross
- Producers: Danny White; Basia Trzetrzelewska

Basia singles chronology
"Yearning" (1994)	"Drunk on Love" (1994)	"Third Time Lucky" (1994)

Music video
- "Drunk on Love" on YouTube

"Drunk on Love" is a song by Polish-born singer Basia, released in 1994 by Epic Records as the third single from her third album, The Sweetest Illusion (1994). The song was co-written and produced by Basia and Danny White. It became a No. 1 hit on the US Billboard Dance Club Songs chart, while peaking at numbers 41 and 12 on the UK Singles Chart and the UK Dance Singles Chart. The accompanying music video was directed by Nick Morris and filmed in London. "Drunk on Love" remains one of Basia's biggest hits.

== Overview ==
The song was written by Basia Trzetrzelewska, Danny White and Peter Ross, and produced by Danny and Basia. It is an uptempo jazz-pop composition with layered scat singing. The track served as the third overall single from The Sweetest Illusion, preceded in 1993 by "More Fire Than Flame", released only in Japan, and the US-only single "Yearning" earlier in 1994. Remixed by Roger Sanchez into what has been described as a "gospel-house" track, "Drunk on Love" turned out very popular in clubs and eventually reached no. 1 on the US Dance Club Songs (called Club Play at that time), spending a total of twelve weeks on the chart.

== Critical reception ==
"Drunk on Love" received positive feedback from American magazines Billboard and Cash Box in 1994. Larry Flick from Billboard noted, "Once again, Basia makes her note-hopping performance look deceptively simple while co-producer Danny White surrounds her with bouncy beats, luscious trumpets, and clipped guitar riffs. Layered scatting at the close of the cut is a lovely surprise. What a treat!" Troy J. Augusto from Cash Box said, "Miss Trzetizelewska (whatta mouthful) is in fine vocal form here, though she does endeavor to keep things relatively simple." Pan-European magazine Music & Media wrote, "Other than most '80s celebrities the former Matt Bianco front lady doesn't only fulfil her contractual obligations. Actually, this multi-formatable jazzy tune radiates inspiration." Music Week noted, "'Drunk on Love' sounds overly intricate on first listen, but its powerful instrumentation and feel-good chrous come alive with repeated plays." In a retrospective review on AllMusic, the song was rated 3.5 out of five stars.

== Music video ==
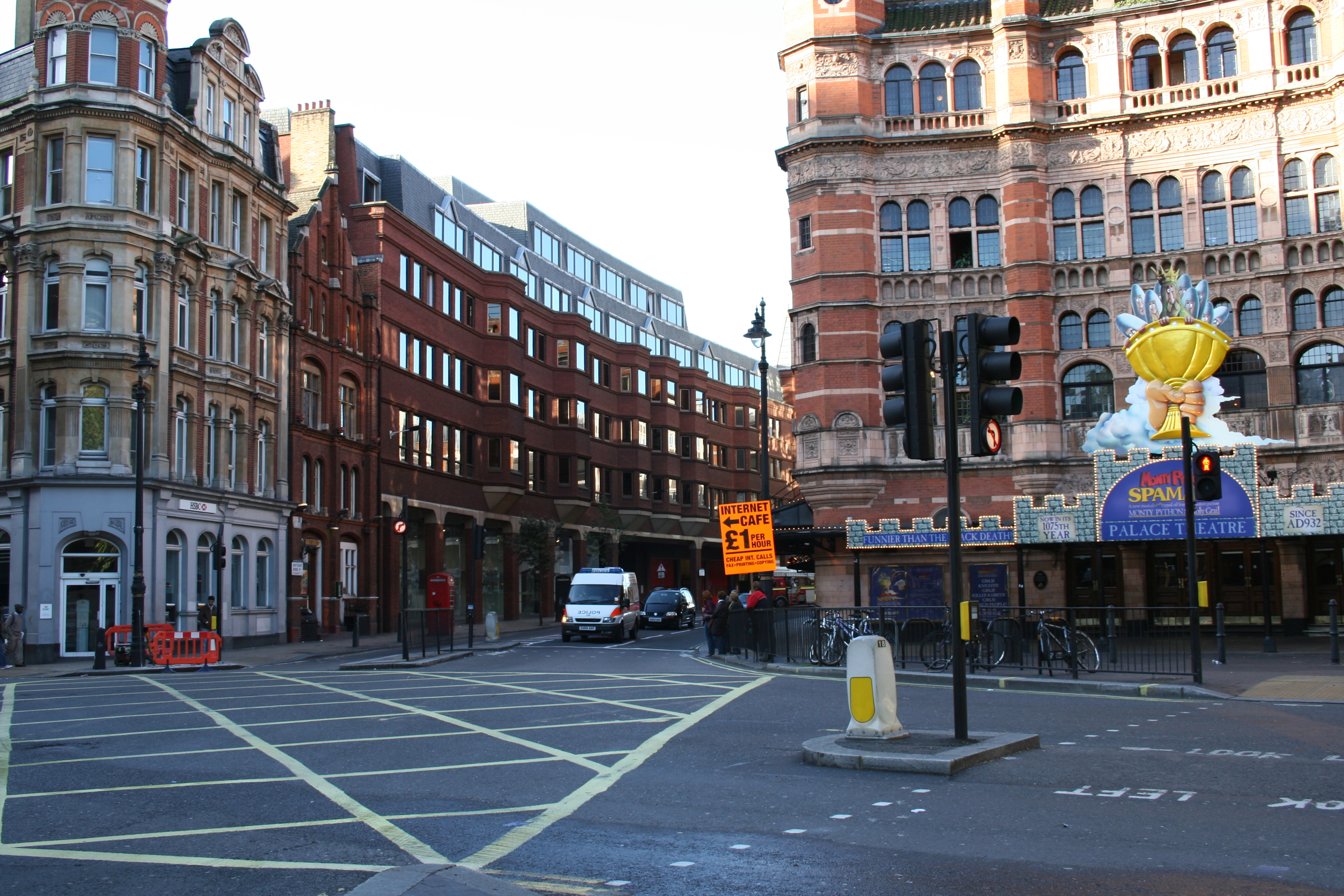
Cambridge Circus in London, where parts of the music video were filmed

The music video for "Drunk on Love" was directed by British film maker Nick Morris, assisted by cinematographer Alastair Meux. It was filmed in spring 1994, largely in the streets of Soho in London's West End. Basia is pictured performing the song with numerous musicians and people dancing in the street, and singing on a rooftop accompanied by her partner Kevin Robinson (later of Simply Red) who then performs a trumpet solo. The pair is also pictured riding an open top car through the streets at night. The video shows footage of Cambridge Circus and Soho Square, and briefly features popular local places Ronnie Scott's Jazz Club, Bar Italia, Soho Brasserie on Old Compton Street, and the now-defunct hair salon Cuts on Frith Street. Distant shots of London landmarks BT Tower, Big Ben and St Paul's Cathedral are also included. In 2009, the video was released on a bonus DVD included in the special edition of Basia's album It's That Girl Again.

== Track listings ==
- 7" single

A. "Drunk on Love" – 4:44
B. "An Olive Tree" – 4:59

- US 12" single

A1. "Drunk on Love" (Roger's Ultimate Anthem Mix) – 11:40
A2. "Drunk on Love" (Downtown Club Mix) – 5:57
B1. "Drunk on Love" (40oz of Love Dub) – 9:00
B2. "Drunk on Love" (Hands in the Air Dub) – 5:56

- UK 12" single

A1. "Drunk on Love" (Roger's Ultimate Anthem Mix) – 11:50
A2. "Drunk on Love" (Album Version) – 4:46
B1. "Drunk on Love" (40oz of Love Dub) – 9:05
B2. "Drunk on Love" (Hands in the Air Dub) – 5:56

- CD single
1. "Drunk on Love" (Edit) – 4:07
2. "Drunk on Love" (Instrumental) – 4:44
3. "An Olive Tree" – 4:59
- US CD maxi single
1. "Drunk on Love" (Single Edit) – 4:06
2. "Drunk on Love" (Downtown Radio Edit) – 3:30
3. "Drunk on Love" (Extended Mix) – 7:50
4. "Drunk on Love" (Downtown Club Mix) – 5:57
5. "Drunk on Love" (Roger's Ultimate Anthem Mix) – 11:40
- UK CD maxi single
1. "Drunk on Love" (Radio Edit) – 4:06
2. "Third Time Lucky" (New Version) – 4:06
3. "Perfect Mother" (Extended Mix) – 3:51
4. "Drunk on Love" (40oz of Love Dub) – 9:05

== Charts ==
=== Weekly charts ===
Chart (1994–95)	Peak position
Europe (European Dance Radio)	20
UK Singles Chart (OCC)	41
UK Dance Singles Chart (OCC)	12
UK Club Chart (Music Week)	68
US Dance Club Songs (Billboard)	1
US Hot Dance Music/Maxi-Singles Sales (Billboard)	13

=== Year-end charts ===
Chart (1994)	Position
US Dance Club Songs (Billboard)	41
