= Time and Tide (Basia album) =

- Standard artwork

Studio album by Basia
- Released: 3 April 1987
- Studios: RG Jones Recording Studios, Power Plant Studios and Utopia Studios (London, England)
- Genres: Jazz-pop; sophisti-pop
- Length: 41:37
- Label: Epic
- Producers: Danny White; Basia Trzetrzelewska

Basia chronology
Time and Tide (1987)	London Warsaw New York (1990)

Alternative cover art
- Artwork for U.S. editions

Professional ratings
Review scores
Source	Rating
AllMusic	3.5/5 stars
People	Positive
Record Collector	3/5 stars
The Recoup	Positive

Time and Tide is the debut studio album by Polish singer-songwriter Basia, released by Epic Records in 1987. The album includes the hit singles "Promises", "New Day for You", and the title track.

== Overview ==
Time and Tide was Basia's first solo album following her and Danny White's departure from the band Matt Bianco. The pair co-produced and mostly co-wrote the material themselves, although Peter Ross of Immaculate Fools contributed to five songs on the album. The record showcases considerable influences from Brazilian music, noted in the track "Astrud", a tribute to Basia's idol Astrud Gilberto.

Six songs were released as singles to promote the record, with "Promises", "New Day for You", and the album's title track being the most successful. All three tracks achieved success on the U.S. adult contemporary chart and the latter was also Basia's first song to break the Top 40 of the Billboard Hot 100.

The album was released in April 1987 in Europe by Portrait Records (CBS) and on 21 August 1987 in the United States by Epic Records. It turned out a considerable success in France where it was certified gold, but performed poorly in the UK and Germany, much to Basia and Danny's disappointment, considering their previous success with Matt Bianco in those markets. The album, however, started to get noticed in the U.S., where it found popularity on the new adult contemporary stations. In December 1987, it was included in Billboard's list of "overlooked pop albums that deserved more attention" compiled by Geoff Mayfield. Originally, Epic Records did not have big expectations towards the album and their target was to sell 10,000 copies. The figure took the label bosses by surprise when it quickly rose to 100,000 and eventually one million. The album was subsequently awarded a platinum sales certification by the Recording Industry Association of America in November 1989 for selling one million copies in the U.S. alone. Time and Tide was followed by the even more successful London Warsaw New York. In 2013, the album was re-released by independent UK label Cherry Red Records as 2 CD deluxe edition featuring instrumental versions and remixes.

== Track listing ==
No.	Title	Writer(s)	Length
1.	"Promises"	Basia Trzetrzelewska, Danny White, Peter Ross	4:06
2.	"Run for Cover"	Trzetrzelewska, White, Ross	3:38
3.	"Time and Tide"	Trzetrzelewska, White	4:03
4.	"Freeze Thaw"	Trzetrzelewska, White, Ross	3:57
5.	"From Now On"	Trzetrzelewska, White	3:45
6.	"New Day for You"	Trzetrzelewska, White, Ross	4:28
7.	"Prime Time TV"	Trzetrzelewska, White, Ross	5:20
8.	"Astrud"	Trzetrzelewska, White	4:39
9.	"How Dare You"	Trzetrzelewska, White	3:22
10.	"Miles Away"	Trzetrzelewska, White	4:10

UK non-Portrait edition bonus tracks
No.	Title	Writer(s)	Length
11.	"Forgive and Forget"	Trzetrzelewska, White	3:16

Japanese 1988 edition bonus tracks
No.	Title	Writer(s)	Length
11.	"Give Me That"	Trzetrzelewska, White	4:25
12.	"Forgive and Forget"	Trzetrzelewska, White	3:16

== Personnel ==
- Basia Trzetrzelewska – all vocals
- Danny White – keyboards, programming, bass
- Andy Ross – guitars
- Peter White – guitars
- Tony Beard – drums
- Bob Jenkins – drums, percussion
- Robin Jones – drums, percussion
- Ray Carless – saxophones
- Steve Gregory – saxophones, flute
- Ronnie Ross – baritone saxophone
- Guy Barker – trumpet
- Kevin Robinson – trumpet

== Production ==
- Producers – Basia Trzetrzelewska and Danny White
- Recorded by Peter Brown, Gerry Kitchingham and John Lee.
- Assistant engineers – Dave Anderson, Michael "Mog" Fry, Simon Gall and Brendon Lynch.
- Mixed by Phil Harding at PWL Studios (London, England).
- Mix assistants – Jamie Broomfield, Mike Duffy and Gary Costa.
- Mastered by Tim Young at The Hit Factory (London, England).
- Artwork – Stylorouge
- Photography – Paul Cox
- Make-up – Louise Constad

== Charts ==
=== Weekly charts ===
Weekly chart performance for Time and Tide
Chart (1987–1989)	Peak position
Australian Albums (ARIA)	50
European Albums (Music & Media)	79
French Albums (IFOP)	16
UK Albums (Official Charts)	61
US Billboard 200	36
US Top Contemporary Jazz Albums (Billboard)	1

=== Year-end charts ===
Year-end chart performance for Time and Tide
Chart (1989)	Position
US Billboard 200	92
US Top Contemporary Jazz Albums (Billboard)	18

== Certifications ==
Certifications for Time and Tide
Region	Certification	Certified units/sales
France (SNEP)	Gold	100,000^{*}
United States (RIAA)	Platinum	1,000,000^{^}
^{*} Sales figures based on certification alone.^{^} Shipments figures based on certification alone.
