= Promises (Basia song) =

Single by Basia

from the album Time and Tide
- Released: 1987
- Genre: Jazz-pop; sophisti-pop
- Length: 4:03
- Label: Epic
- Songwriters: Basia Trzetrzelewska; Danny White; Peter Ross
- Producers: Danny White; Basia Trzetrzelewska

Basia singles chronology
"Run for Cover" (1986)	"Promises" (1987)	"Freeze Thaw" (1987)

"Promises" is a song by Polish singer Basia from her debut studio album Time and Tide, released in 1987. The track was written by Basia Trzetrzelewska, Danny White, and Peter Ross of Immaculate Fools. It was produced by Danny and Basia, and is a samba-influenced jazz-pop song. The single was first a minor hit in the UK in January 1988. In 1989, "Promises" charted in the USA, where remixes of the song by Justin Strauss were released on a 12" maxi single.

== Music videos ==
The first music video for the song pictures Basia on a balcony in the middle of a three-storey building, with shadows of the building's inhabitants showing in the windows. She performs the song as the residents go about their everyday lives.

The second clip was filmed in 1989 by Crescenzo Notarile and is a performance music video. It pictures Basia performing the song accompanied by a band and dancers, with a colorful wall painting in the background. This version was included on the VHS/LaserDisc release A New Day in 1990.

== Critical reception ==
Jerry Smith of Music Week magazine praised "Promises" he called a "smooth, stylish" song.

== Track listings ==
- 7" single

A. "Promises" – 3:57
B. "Promises" (Instrumental) – 3:48

- 7" single

A. "Promises"
B. "Give Me That"

- 7" single

A. "Promises" – 4:03
B. "From Now On" – 3:46

- 12" single

A. "Promises" (Extended Remix) – 5:29
B. "From Now On" (Band Version) – 4:05

- 12" single

A. "Promises" (Extended French Mix)
B1. "Give Me That"
B2. "From Now On"

- 12" single

A1. "Promises" (Justin Strauss Remix) – 7:12
A2. "Promises" (Just Right Dub) – 7:44
B1. "Promises" (Samba House Mix) – 4:02
B2. "Promises" (Deep Dub) – 5:57

- CD maxi single
1. "Promises" (Extended French Mix) – 5:32
2. "Give Me That" – 4:24
3. "Astrud" – 4:39
4. "From Now On" (Band Version) – 4:06

== Charts ==
1988-1989 weekly chart performance for "Promises"
Chart (1988–89)	Peak position
Canada (RPM 100 Singles)	78
Quebec (ADISQ)	46
UK Singles Chart (OCC)	48
UK Dance (Music Week)	27
US Billboard Adult Contemporary	8

== Cover versions ==
- Gloria Lasso released a Spanish language version on her self-titled 1989 album.
- In 2006, Julie Dexter released a cover of the song on her album Moon Bossa, a collaboration with Khari Simmons.
