= Immaculate Fools =

British rock group

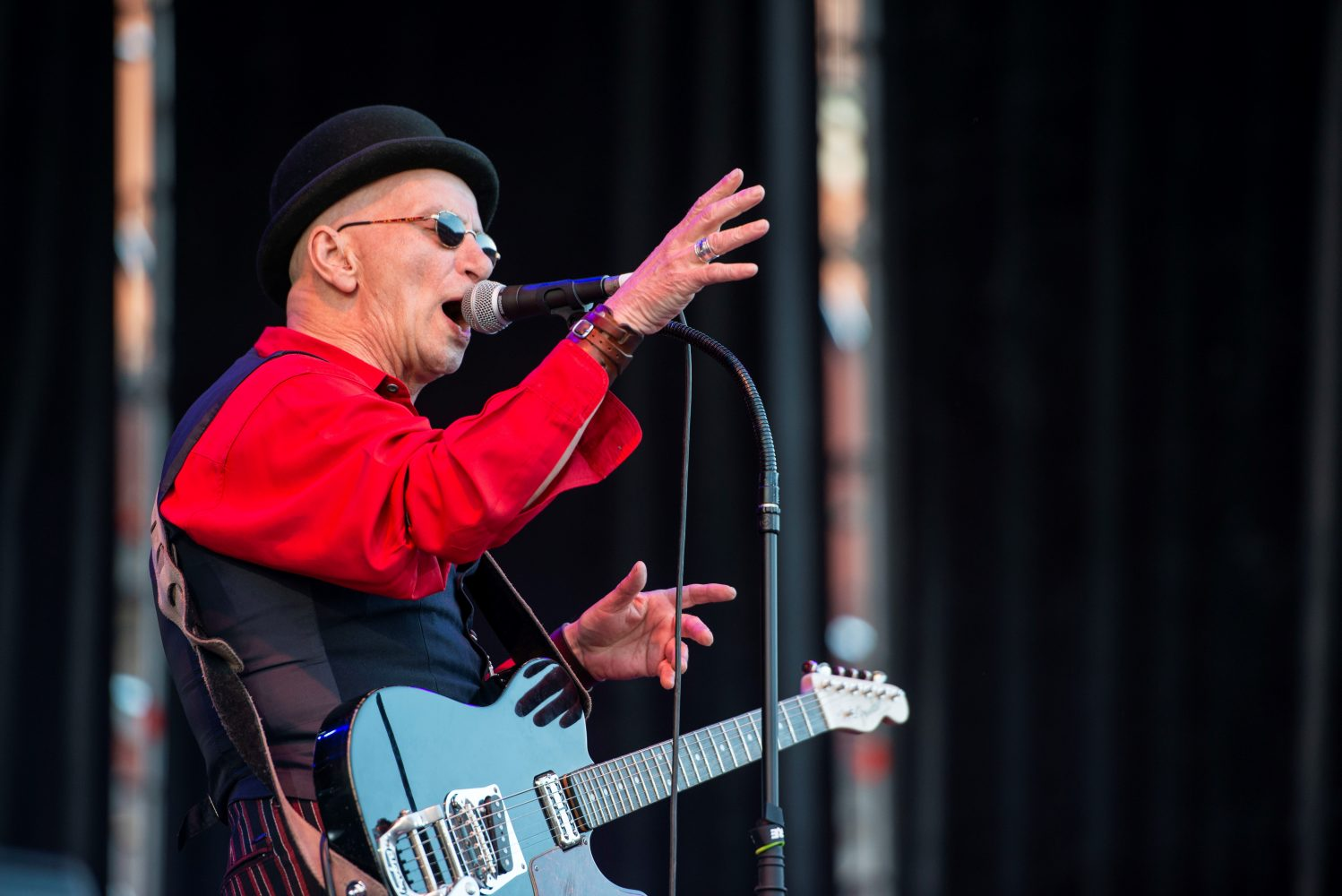
- Immaculate Fools performance (2018)

Background information
- Origin: Kent, England
- Genres: Pop/Rock
- Years active: 1984–1997, 2015–
- Labels: A&M, Epic, Continuum, Cooking Vinyl, Cherry Red
- Members: Kevin Weatherill [Vocals, Guitar, Harmonica] Linda Lamb [Vocals] Paco Charlín [Bass] Max Gómez [Drums] Harry Price [Violin] Phil Andrews [Guitar, Keyboards, Mandolin]
- Past members: Kevin Weatherill; Paul Weatherill; Andy Ross; Peter Ross; Barry Wickens; Paul Skidmore; Ian Devlin; Brian Betts; Nick Thomas; Alex Valentine; Adam Fuest; Phil 'Redfox' O'Sullivan; Christian Pattemore; Phil Andrews; Laura Solla Gómez [Guitar] Naíma Acuña [Drums] Alex Salgeiro [Keyboards] Helena 'Hels' Watt [Violin]
- Website: http://www.immaculatefools.com

Immaculate Fools were a pop/rock group formed in 1984, who had their biggest UK success in 1985 with the single "Immaculate Fools", and continued until 1997, releasing six studio albums before splitting up. In 2015, Kevin Weatherill reformed the group with new members.

== Formation, album history and tours ==
The band was formed in Kent, England by two sets of brothers: Kevin Weatherill (vocals, guitar) and Paul Weatherill (bass, vocals), and brothers Andy Ross (guitar) and Peter Ross (drums), the sons of saxophonist Ronnie Ross.

The band's single "Immaculate Fools" reached No. 51 in the UK Singles Chart in January 1985. Their debut album, Hearts of Fortune, reached No. 65 in the UK Albums Chart the same year. The band toured Europe extensively, building a strong following in Spain, where they had significant chart success and made several television appearances. The band also toured the United States and Canada in 1992 supporting Ronnie Wood.

In 1987 the band's second album, Dumb Poet, was well received by critics (including a five-star review in Sounds magazine), although it did not repeat the first album's commercial success. The album did, however, give the band a second charting single with "Tragic Comedy."

The band underwent a major line-up change when the Ross brothers left, with Barry Wickens (violin), Brian Betts (guitar), Paul Skidmore (drums) and Ian Devlin (keyboards) joining for the Another Man's World album. The band set up a recording studio in a farmhouse (Woodhouse) on the Welsh borders near Ludlow. For the band's final two albums, Woodhouse and Kiss and Punch, the Weatherill brothers were joined by Wickens, Betts, and Nick Thomas (drums).

They continued to record music and occasionally tour until they formally split up in 1997.

== After the breakup ==
Kevin Weatherill, who was not only the lead vocalist but also the main songwriter of the band, continued to record and tour both in the UK and Europe under the name Dirty Ray. In 2010 he worked with Miles Hunt (of the band Wonderstuff) and violinist Erica Nockalls to produce the album Big World for a Little Man.

Andy Ross went on to work with Basia, Howard Jones, Miguel Bosé, and Tori Amos. In 2013 Andy Ross won an award at the Reel Earth Environmental Film Festival in New Zealand for his short film, Well Beyond Water, about the plight of drought affected farmers in New South Wales.

Following an accident, Paul Weatherill died in 2020.

== Reformation ==
In December 2014, Kevin Weatherill announced on his website that Immaculate Fools were to reform in 2015, initially playing some gigs in Spain, Portugal and Italy, and then planning a UK tour. In February 2015, the band began recording a new album titled Turn the Whole World Down, which was produced by Adam Fuest.

The reformed act toured Spain in 2015 with new members Linda Lamb (bass), Adam Fuest (guitar), Helen Watt (violin), Phil Redfox O'Sullivan (drums), and Alex Valentine (keyboards). For the Spring Tour of Spain in 2016, Immaculate Fools were joined by touring members Christian Pattemore and Phil Andrews of Thieves of Time on bass. Between October 2015 and June 2016 Immaculate Fools performed 26 shows in Spain.

In the summer of 2016, following Weatherill's relocation to Spain, the logistics of continuing the band in its current form became problematic. Adam Fuest and Kevin Weatherill parted company and Weatherill formed a new seven piece version of the band featuring local Spanish and UK musicians and continued to perform in Spain. In the spring of 2017, Weatherill released an album of new material under the name Immaculate Fools, titled Keep the Blade Sharp and began touring Spain to promote it.

In early 2020, Weatherill announced that he was working once more with original band member Andy Ross and in October of that year the first single from that partnership - 'Two to Tango' was released. This was followed by three more singles and a full album, Stardust and Water (the Ballad of the Immaculate Fools) was released on November 29, 2020. The album features guitars, keyboards and vocals from Andy Ross who also produced the album.

Also in November 2020, Cherry Red released a box set of all the band's albums from the 80s and 90s. The release, titled Searching for Sparks included a live CD and alternative versions of some tracks.

Kevin Weatherill also continues to perform under the name Dirty Ray with Paco Charlín and Naíma Acuña and tours Spain with the Immaculate Fools

== Discography ==
=== Albums ===
- Hearts of Fortune (1985) Polygram (UK #65)
- Dumb Poet (1987) A&M
- Another Man's World (1990) CBS/Epic
- The Toy Shop (1992) Continuum
- Woodhouse (1995) Cooking Vinyl
- Kiss and Punch (1996) Cooking Vinyl
- Turn the Whole World Down (2015) bandcamp
- Keep the Blade Sharp (2017)
- Stardust and Water (2020)

=== Compilation albums ===
- Searching for Sparks (2020) Cherry Red
- Smart Music for Smart People (1988) BNM
- The Best of Immaculate Fools (1998)
- No Gods No Masters (1998) Recall

=== Singles ===
- "Nothing Means Nothing" (1984) A&M
- "Immaculate Fools" (1984) A&M (UK #51)
- "Hearts Of Fortune" (1987) A&M
- "Save It" (1985) A&M
- "Never Give Less Than Everything" (1987) A&M
- "Tragic Comedy" (1987) A&M (UK #76)
- "Wish You Were Here" (1987) A&M
- "Falling Apart Together" (1990) Epic
- "Sad" (1990) CBS
- "Prince" (1990) CBS/Epic
- "Heaven Down Here" (1992) Continuum
- "Stand Down" (1992) Continuum
- "Kiss and Punch" (1996) Cooking Vinyl
- "Blanket" (2017)
- "Two to Tango" (2020)
- "Lay Her Down" (2020)
- "Below this Sun" (2020)
- "Stardust and Water" (2020)
