= London Warsaw New York =

Studio album by Basia
- Released: February 19, 1990
- Recorded: 1989
- Genres: Jazz-pop; sophisti-pop
- Length: 42:32
- Label: Epic
- Producers: Danny White; Basia Trzetrzelewska

Basia chronology
Time and Tide (1987)	London Warsaw New York (1990)	Brave New Hope (1990)

Professional ratings
Review scores
Source	Rating
AllMusic	4.5/5 stars
Billboard	Positive
Cash Box	Positive
Los Angeles Times	3.5/5 stars
Music & Media	Positive
The Recoup	Positive
Soul and Jazz and Funk	3/5 stars
Record Mirror	2/5 stars

London Warsaw New York is the second solo studio album by Polish-born singer–songwriter Basia, released in February 1990 by Epic Records. It spawned one of Basia's biggest hits, "Cruising for Bruising".

== Overview ==
The album's title was inspired by the tag "London Paris New York" often seen on perfume packaging. Basia decided to replace Paris with Warsaw to emphasize that she is Polish and that the album was written between the three countries represented by those cities. All three cities are name-checked in the song "Copernicus": "Our love will take this globe by storm/If it's London, Warsaw, or New York". The line is also sung in Polish later in the track: "Naszą miłością podbijemy glob/Londyn, Warszawę albo Nowy Jork". The other song incorporating Basia's native language is "Reward", in which she sings: "Jesteś moją nagrodą" (English: "You are my reward").

"Baby You're Mine" was released as the lead single in early 1990 and was met with moderate success. "Cruising for Bruising" followed as the second single and became Basia's biggest hit yet. In North America, it served as the first single, followed by "Baby You're Mine". "Copernicus" was a Japan-only single, although Basia performed the track on Late Night with David Letterman on November 22, 1990. The final single was the cover of "Until You Come Back to Me (That's What I'm Gonna Do)", which charted on Billboard's Adult Contemporary list.

London Warsaw New York is often regarded as Basia's best album. It is also her most commercially successful release, having sold over 2 million copies worldwide, around half of which were sold in the USA, where the record was certified platinum in August 1992 and became Billboard's Contemporary Jazz Album of 1990. In 2015, the album was re-released by independent UK label Cherry Red Records as a 2 CD deluxe edition featuring instrumentals, remixes, and demo versions.

== Track listing ==
All songs written by Basia Trzetrzelewska and Danny White, except where noted.

1. "Cruising for Bruising" – 4:10
2. "Best Friends" – 4:01
3. "Brave New Hope" – 4:06
4. "Baby You're Mine" – 3:34
5. "Ordinary People" – 4:58
6. "Reward" – 5:08
7. "Until You Come Back to Me" (Stevie Wonder, Clarence Paul, Morris Broadnax) – 3:51
8. "Copernicus" – 3:51
9. "Not an Angel" – 4:23
10. "Take Him Back Rachel" – 4:18

== Personnel ==
- Basia Trzetrzelewska – vocals
- Danny White – keyboards, programming
- Andy Ross – guitars (1, 4)
- Marc Antoine – wah wah guitar (2)
- Peter White – guitars (2, 4–10), accordion (5)
- Julian Crampton – bass (2, 9)
- Andres Lafone – bass (4, 8, 10)
- Andy Gangadeen – additional drums (1, 2, 4, 8), drums (3)
- Snowboy – percussion (1, 3, 10), congas (2), berimbau (4), shaker (4)
- Robin Jones – percussion (5, 8)
- Steve Gregory – saxophone (5)
- Ronnie Ross – baritone saxophone (8), bass saxophone (9)
- Bud Beadle – saxophone (10)
- Kevin Robinson – trumpet (2, 5, 7, 9, 10)
- Fiachra Trench – string arrangements (3)
- Gavyn Wright – strings leader (3), strings (4)

== Production ==
- Arranged and produced by Basia Trzetrzelewska and Danny White.
- Recorded by Mike Dignam at Eden Studios (London, England).
- Assistant engineers – Richard Barraclough, Derek Fisher and Donal Hodgson.
- Mixed by Phil Harding at PWL Studios (London, England).
- Mix assistants – Tony King and Les Sharma
- Mastered by Tim Young at The Hit Factory (London, England).
- Design – The Leisure Process
- Photography – Paul Cox and Mark Borthwick
- Management – Alan Seifert

== Charts ==
=== Weekly charts ===
Weekly chart performance for London Warsaw New York
Chart (1990)	Peak position
Canada Top Albums/CDs (RPM)	56
Dutch Albums (Album Top 100)	60
French Albums (IFOP)	28
Japanese Albums (Oricon)	33
UK Albums (Official Charts)	68
US Billboard 200	20
US Top Contemporary Jazz Albums (Billboard)	1

=== Year-end charts ===
Year-end chart performance for London Warsaw New York
Chart (1990)	Position
US Billboard 200	59
US Top Contemporary Jazz Albums (Billboard)	1

== Certifications ==
Certifications for London Warsaw New York
Region	Certification	Certified units/sales
France (SNEP)	Gold	100,000^{*}
United States (RIAA)	Platinum	1,000,000^{^}
^{*} Sales figures based on certification alone.^{^} Shipments figures based on certification alone.
