= Cruising for Bruising =

1990 single by Basia

Single by Basia

from the album London Warsaw New York
- Released: 1990
- Recorded: 1989
- Genre: Jazz-pop; sophisti-pop
- Length: 4:08
- Label: Epic
- Songwriters: Basia Trzetrzelewska; Danny White
- Producers: Danny White; Basia Trzetrzelewska

Basia singles chronology
"Baby You're Mine" (1990)	"Cruising for Bruising" (1990)	"Copernicus" (1990)

"Cruising for Bruising" is a song by Polish singer Basia released in 1990 as the second single from her second solo album, London Warsaw New York (1990). The song remains one of her biggest hits to date.

== Background and writing ==
"Cruising for Bruising" was written and produced by Basia Trzetrzelewska and Danny White, and tells about the breakup of their romantic relationship. The lyrics indicate that the split is not definitive and do not rule out giving the relationship a second chance.

== Music video ==
The music video for the song was directed by Nick Morris and filmed in a countryside in Oxfordshire, England since Basia wanted to make it "very English". It pictures Basia and Danny as a couple in the final moments of their failed relationship. The clip begins with Danny arriving at their home where he starts to pack his belongings into a suitcase. He leaves after dusk, giving Basia one last hug outside the house, and drives off accompanied by another woman. Moments after his departure, Basia's new partner arrives and embraces her.

Basia has revealed that during the shooting of the video her make-up had to be repeatedly redone because the song "was so close to the bone" that she was crying on the set.

The music video was released on the 1990 video disc format based on laserdisc called VSD, and on the 1990 VHS video compilation A New Day. In 2009, the video was released on a bonus DVD included in the special edition of Basia's album It's That Girl Again.

== Critical reception ==
David Giles of Music Week stated that "Cruising for Bruising" "is less commercial than [Basia's] previous offerings from a melodic point of view, and without compensating by whacking up the beat". Much more enthusiastic, a review published in Music & Media magazine elected "Cruising for Bruising" "Single of the week", described it as one of the best tracks from the parent album London Warsaw New York, a "radio-friendly song" and a "smooth and easy-going pop number", and praised Basia's "crystal-clear voice and fresh sounding composition".

== Chart performance ==
"Cruising for Bruising" reached the Top 40 in both the US and Canada, where it stayed in the charts for twelve and fourteen weeks, respectively. By contrast, it failed to be a major hit in Europe, as it barely made the top 50 in France (46), did not manage to reach the top 50 in the Netherlands (51), and stalled at number 86 in the UK.

== Track listings ==
- 7" single/CD single/Cassette single

A. "Cruising for Bruising" – 4:05
B. "Come to Heaven" – 4:08

- 12" single

A. "Cruising for Bruising" (Extended Mix) – 6:45
B. "Come to Heaven" – 4:08

- CD maxi single
1. "Cruising for Bruising" – 4:08
2. "Cruising for Bruising" (Instrumental) – 4:09
3. "Cruising for Bruising" (Extended Version) – 6:16
4. "From Now On" – 3:43

== Charts ==
=== Weekly charts ===
1990 weekly chart performance for "Cruising for Bruising"
Chart (1990)	Peak position
Australia (ARIA)	161
Canada Top Singles (RPM)	21
Canada Adult Contemporary (RPM)	4
France (SNEP)	46
Netherlands (Single Top 100)	51
Quebec (ADISQ)	9
UK Singles (Official Charts)	86
US Billboard Hot 100	29
US Adult Contemporary (Billboard)	5
US Cash Box Top 100	27

=== Year-end charts ===
1990 year-end chart performance for "Cruising for Bruising"
Chart (1990)	Position
Canada Adult Contemporary (RPM)	39
