= Nick Morris (director) =

British film maker; music video director

Nick Morris is a British film maker. He is best known for directing music videos in the 1980s.

== Career ==
Morris began writing and making amateur films at school, one of which was shown at the NFT. His professional career began in the 1980s with music videos for "The Final Countdown" by Europe, "Kyrie" by Mr. Mister and "Everytime You Go Away" by Paul Young. After making approximately 100 promos for artists such as Elton John, Celine Dion, Alison Moyet, Warrant, Terence Trent D'Arby, Stevie Wonder, Paul Carrack, Prefab Sprout, Kirsty MacColl, Go West, the Kane Gang, The Alarm, Status Quo, Toto, Natalie Cole, Nena, Scorpions and the number one charity single Ferry Aid, he moved into longer form projects including the Cirque du Soleil show Alegría, which was nominated for a primetime Emmy, a Great Performances TV adaptation of Jesus Christ Superstar in 2000, which won an International Emmy,, and AC/DC's Stiff Upper Lip Live in Munich. He has also directed DVDs for comedians such as The Mighty Boosh, Mitchell and Webb and Bill Bailey. Other work includes numerous trailers and music clips for West End shows such as The Producers, Spamalot, Calendar Girls, Guys and Dolls, Edward Scissorhands and The Rocky Horror Show. in 2009 he captured Spandau Ballet's triumphant homecoming concert at the O2 Arena in London and Jude Law's portrayal of Hamlet. At the same venue in the following year, Nick directed the massive celebration of the 25th anniversary of "Les Miserables" live to cinemas around the world, featuring three complete casts of the show and numerous guest stars from previous performances. The following year he directed another celebration, this time the 25th anniversary show of Phantom of the Opera. As with “Les Miserables” the live-to-cinemas show went to number one in the UK Cinema box office. Since then Nick has directed many multicam recordings of shows shown live or as live in cinemas, most notably “Lazarus”, David Bowie’s last project,”Red”, starring Alfred Molina and the hit west end show “Everybody's Talking About Jamie”.

== Selected music video credits ==
=== 1984 ===
- Nena – „Irgendwie, irgendwo, irgendwann“

=== 1985 ===
- Paul Young - "Everytime You Go Away"
- Kirsty MacColl - "He's on the Beach"
- Mr. Mister - "Kyrie"
- Slade - "Little Sheila"

=== 1986 ===
- The Alarm - "Spirit of '76"
- Europe - "The Final Countdown"
- Toto - "I'll Be Over You"
- Eddie Money - "Take Me Home Tonight"
- Eddie Money - "I Wanna Go Back"
- Europe - "Rock the Night"

=== 1987 ===
- Europe - Carrie
- The Robert Cray Band - "Nothin' But a Woman"
- Jennifer Rush & Elton John - "Flames of Paradise"
- Mason Ruffner - "Dancing on Top of the World"
- Jennifer Rush - "Heart Over Mind"
- Eddie Money - "We Should Be Sleeping"
- Europe - "Cherokee"

=== 1988 ===
- The Alarm - "Presence of Love"
- Cinderella - "Gypsy Road"
- Europe - "Superstitious"
- Cinderella - "Don't Know What You Got (Till It's Gone)"
- Europe - "Let the Good Times Rock"
- Cheap Trick - "Ghost Town"

=== 1989 ===
- Warrant - "Heaven"
- Cinderella - "The Last Mile"
- Marillion - "Hooks in You"

=== 1990 ===
- Basia - "Cruising for Bruising"
- No Sweat - "Heart and Soul"
- Warrant - "Big Talk"
- Bad English - "Price of Love"

=== 1991 ===
- Roadhouse - "Tower of Love"
- Steelheart - "She's Gone"
- Bad English - "Straight to Your Heart"
- Europe - "Prisoners in Paradise"
- Warrant - "I Saw Red"
