= List of music videos set in London =

The following is a list of official music videos that were set and primarily filmed in London, England.

Year	Track title	Artist	Video director	Location(s)
1965	"Concrete And Clay"	Unit 4+2		The Barbican
1965	"Subterranean Homesick Blues"	Bob Dylan	D. A. Pennebaker, Pennebaker Films	Savoy Steps, Strand
1965	"The Kids Are Alright"	The Who		Hyde Park
1966	"Paperback Writer"	The Beatles"		Chiswick House
1966	"Rain"	The Beatles	Michael Lindsay-Hogg	Chiswick House
1970	"In the Summertime	Mungo Jerry"		Park Lane
1978	"Is This Love"	Bob Marley & The Wailers		Keskidee Centre (King's Cross)
1978	"News of the World"	The Jam		Battersea Power Station
1979	"Feels Like I'm in Love"	Kelly Marie		HMS Belfast
1980	"Towers of London"	XTC		Tower Bridge
1981	"Making Your Mind Up"	Bucks Fizz		Harrods
1981	"Ghost Town"	The Specials	Barney Bubbles	City of London, East End, Blackwall Tunnel
1981	"Golden Brown"	The Stranglers	Lindsey Clennell	Leighton House Museum
1981	"Vienna"	Ultravox	Russell Mulcahy	Covent Garden and Gaumont State Cinema
1981	"Visage"	Visage		Covent Garden
1982	"'Ullo John! Gotta New Motor?"	Alexei Sayle		Goldhawk Road, W12 - London Buses
1982	"If You Can't Stand the Heat	Bucks Fizz		Shaftesbury Theatre
1982	"Now Those Days Are Gone"	Bucks Fizz		Hyde Park
1982	"Come on Eileen"	Dexys Midnight Runners		Kennington
1982	"Love Action (I Believe in Love)"	The Human League		Docklands and Warwick Avenue
1982	"Our House"	Madness		Willesden Junction
1982	"Pass the Dutchie"	Musical Youth	Don Letts	South Bank
1982	"Youth of Today"	Musical Youth		
1982	"Strange Little Girl"	The Stranglers		Cambridge Circus
1982	"Always Something There to Remind Me"	Naked Eyes		
1983	"London Town"	Bucks Fizz		Holloway Sanitorium, Egham
1983	"Owner of a Lonely Heart"	Yes		Westminster Bridge
1983	"Unconditional Love"	Donna Summer featuring Musical Youth		Kingston upon Thames
1983	"New Song"	Howard Jones		Holborn tube station
1983	"(Keep Feeling) Fascination"	The Human League	Steve Barron	Plaistow, Newham
1984	"Smalltown Boy"	Bronski Beat		Southwest Trains
1984	"Louise"	The Human League	Steve Barron	Southall, Ealing,'The Common' beside Grand Union Canal
1984	West End Girls	Pet Shop Boys	Andy Morahan and Eric Watson	West End, Waterloo station and Queen Walk
1984	"Love Glove"	Visage	Nick Morris	Docklands
1984	"What Do I Do?"	Phil Fearon		
1985	"Emotion"	Barbra Streisand	Richard Baskin and Barbra Streisand	Jacob Street Studios (Bermondsey)
1985	"Dancing in the Street"	David Bowie and Mick Jagger	David Mallet	London Docklands
1985	"Walking on Sunshine"	Katrina and the Waves		Tower Bridge
1985	"Heart of Lothian"	Marillion		North Kensington
1985	"Say I'm Your Number One"	Princess		Open top bus
1985	"So Macho"	Sinitta		Harley Street
1985	"Absolute Reality"	The Alarm		
1986	"Change of Heart"	Cyndi Lauper	Andy Morahan	Trafalgar Square
1986	"Press"	Paul McCartney		London Underground
1986	"A Way"	The Bolshoi		
1986	"Sunday Morning"	The Bolshoi		
1987	"Never Gonna Give You Up"	Rick Astley		Freston Road railway bridge, Harrow Club
1987	"London"	Roger Hodgson		
1987	"Please"	The Bolshoi		
1987	"T.V. Man"	The Bolshoi		
1988	"Good Life"	Inner City		Trafalgar Square and Piccadilly Circus
1988	"Girl You Know It's True"	Milli Vanilli		London Buses
1989	"Street Tuff"	Double Trouble Ft. Rebel MC	Docklands	
1989	"Everlasting Love"	Howard Jones		Regent's Park
1991	"Bang"	Blur	Willy Smax	West End
1991	"Rhinoceros"	The Smashing Pumpkins	Angela Conway	Hyde Park
1992	"Metal Mickey"	Suede		
1993	"For Tomorrow"	Blur	Julien Temple	Trafalgar Square and Primrose Hill
1993	"Deep"	East 17		Walthamstow
1993	"House of Love"	East 17		Walthamstow Stadium
1993	"Animal Nitrate"	Suede	Pedro Romhanyi	Lisson Green Estate, Westminster
1994	"Drunk on Love"	Basia		West End
1994	"Parklife"	Blur	Pedro Romhanyi	Greenwich Peninsula
1994	"Line Up"	Elastica		
1994	"Missing"	Everything but the Girl	Mark Szaszy	Balham, Clapham South
1994	"Trouble"	Shampoo		
1994	"Killing of a Flash Boy"	Suede		Nightingale Estate, Hackney
1994	"Supersonic"	Oasis	Mark Szaszy	13 Euston Road, King's Cross
1995	"Inner City Life"	Goldie	Mike Lipscombe	Camberwell
1995	"Disco 2000"	Pulp	Pedro Romhanyi	Smashing Night Club
1995	"Just"	Radiohead	Jamie Thraves	Liverpool Street station
1995	"He's on the Phone"	Saint Etienne		West End
1995	"Camden Town"	Suggs		Camden Town
1996	"Machinehead"	Bush	Shawn Mortensen	Shepherd's Bush
1996	"Hey Dude"	Kula Shaker		
1996	"Wide Open Space"	Mansun		Soho
1996	"Return of the Mack"	Mark Morrison		
1996	"Firestarter"	The Prodigy	Walter Stern	Aldwych tube station
1996	"Wannabe"	Spice Girls	Johan Camitz	Midland Grand Hotel (St Pancras)
1996	"C'mon Kids"	The Boo Radleys		Islington
1997	"Setting Sun"	Chemical Brothers featuring Noel Gallagher	Dom&nic	Crystal Palace Park
1997	"Where's the Love"	Hanson		Battersea Power Station and Trafalgar Square
1997	"Taxloss"	Mansun	Roman Coppola	Liverpool Street station
1997	"Saturday Night"	Suede	Pedro Romhanyi	Holborn tube station
1997	"Bitter Sweet Symphony"	The Verve	Walter Stern	Hoxton
1997	"Lucky Man"	The Verve		Hammersmith
1997	"Hybrid Rainbow"	The Pillows	Oku Kazuyoshi	Berwick Street, Battersea Power Station and Primrose Hill
1998	"Because We Want To"	Billie Piper	Phil Griffin	Greenwich
1999	"Hey Boy Hey Girl"	The Chemical Brothers	Dom&nic	Natural History Museum and Ministry of Sound
1999	"Turn"	Travis		Nightingale Estate, Hackney
2000	"Jestem powietrzem"	Anita Lipnicka		
2000	"Tomorrow Comes Today"	Gorillaz	Jamie Hewlett	
2000	"God Save the Queen"	Motörhead		Open top bus
2001	"Gotta Get Thru This"	Daniel Bedingfield	Director X	Canary Wharf
2001	"You Give Me Something"	Jamiroquai		Docklands
2002	"Girlfriend"	Alicia Keys	Patrick Hoelck	
2003	"Don't Look Back into the Sun"	The Libertines	Alexander Strickland-Clarke	West End
2003	"Anyplace, Anywhere, Anytime"	Nena and Kim Wilde		Exchange Alley
2003	"London"	Pet Shop Boys		Shepherd's Bush, Piccadilly Circus, Millennium Bridge, Soho, Peckham
2003	"She Believes (In Me)"	Ronan Keating		
2004	"Cry"	Alex Parks		Charing Cross tube station
2004	"What Became of the Likely Lads"	The Libertines		Thamesmead
2004	"Party for Two"	Shania Twain featuring Billy Currington or Mark McGrath	Marcus Raboy	South Kensington
2005	"So Here We Are"	Bloc Party		
2005	"Fix You"	Coldplay	Sophie Muller	Southwark and King's Cross
2005	"Hung Up"	Madonna	David LaChapelle	Charing Cross tube station
2005	"Na dwa"	Sistars		
2006	"Love Don't Let Me Go (Walking Away)"	David Guetta featuring The Egg		Heygate Estate
2006	"Four"	The Elizabeth Shepherd Trio		City
2006	"London Bridge"	Fergie	Marc Webb	Woolwich
2006	"Waste a Moment"	Fightstar		Aldwych tube station
2006	"Runaway"	Jamiroquai		Piccadilly Circus, London
2006	"Hot Kiss"	Juliette and the Licks		City
2006	"LDN"	Lily Allen		
2006	"Sorry"	Madonna	Jamie King	
2006	"Stop Me"	Mark Ronson featuring Daniel Merriweather		Docks, River Thames, Canary Wharf and Millennium Bridge
2007	"Ayo Technology"	50 Cent featuring Justin Timberlake and Timbaland		
2007	"Mr Rock & Roll"	Amy Macdonald		
2007	"Back to Black"	Amy Winehouse	Phil Griffin	Stoke Newington
2007	"I Still Remember"	Bloc Party		London Overground
2007	"Suburban Knights"	Hard-Fi	Ben Crook	North Woolwich
2007	"Overpowered"	Róisín Murphy		
2007	"About You Now"	Sugababes	Marcus Adams	Lambeth
2008	"Warwick Avenue"	Duffy	Daniel Wolfe	Warwick Avenue tube station
2008	"Never Miss a Beat"	Kaiser Chiefs	Goodtimes	Abbey Wood, Thamesmead
2009	"Always Like This"	Bombay Bicycle Club		
2009	"I Love London"	Crystal Fighters	Martin Zahringer	
2009	" Roses For The Dead "	Funeral for a Friend		Chiswick Chiswick School Brentford
2009	"Welcome to England"	Tori Amos		Kensington Gardens and London Eye
2010	"Addiction"	Andi Fraggs		Soho
2010	"Forever Dolphin Love"	Connan Mockasin		Elephant & Castle
2010	"Louder"	Katy B		
2010	"Lights On"	Katy B featuring Ms. Dynamite	Johny Mourgue	Vauxhall Arches
2010	"Spotlights"	Kris Zar	Matthew Gravelle and Kris Zar	South Bank, Greenwich Park, Docklands
2011	"People Help the People"	Birdy		London Bridge
2011	"Criminal"	Britney Spears	Chris Marrs Piliero	Ealing, Stoke Newington and Dalston
2011	"With Ur Love"	Cher Lloyd		City
2011	"Take a Chance on Me"	JLS		Tower Bridge
2011	"Letters"	Kelly Erez		
2011	"Just a Kiss"	Lady Antebellum	Shaun Silva	
2011	"Getting Nowhere"	Magnetic Man featuring John Legend		Docklands
2011	"Don't Go"	Wretch 32 featuring Josh Kumra		Docklands
2012	"Timebomb"	Kylie Minogue	Christian Larson	Soho
2012	"One Thing"	One Direction	Declan Whitebloom	West End and South Bank
2012	"Remedy"	Professor Green		Shoreditch High Street
2012	"Candy"	Robbie Williams	Joseph Kahn	Spitalfields
2012	"Sight of You"	Tulisa	Luke Hyams	
2012	"This Is Love"	will.i.am featuring Eva Simons		South Bank
2013	"Goin' Crazy"	Dizzee Rascal featuring Robbie Williams		Dalston
2013	"Crooked"	G-Dragon		Shoreditch
2013	"Come to Me"	Kelly Erez	Ben Galster	King's Cross
2013	"Army of Two"	Olly Murs	Vaughan Arnell	ExCeL London
2013	"Shooting Star"	Tara McDonald featuring Zaho		Bethnal Green
2013	"Better Than Wages"	Thee Faction		Canary Wharf
2014	"High Street"	Dev Hynes featuring Skepta	Lucy Luscombe	Muswell Hill
2014	"Double Bubble Trouble"	MIA	M.I.A.	Peckham
2014	"Midnight Memories"	One Direction		River Thames and Tower Bridge
2014	"Trouble on Oxford Street"	Skinny Lister		Oxford Street
2014	"Got No Fans"	The Wealdstone Raider		Trafalgar Square, Piccadilly Circus, Westminster Bridge, Parliament Square, West End
2015	"Sum of My Parts"	The Ethical Debating Society		Leyton
2015	"Whisky Story"	Example	Example and Adam Powell	Charing Cross tube station
2016	"Blow your mind"	Dua Lipa		Barbican Centre
2016	"I Wanna Be"	Katy B featuring Chris Lorenzo		Shoreditch, Trafalgar Square, Tower Bridge
2016	"Secret Love Song"	Little Mix featuring Jason Derulo	Frank Borin	London Bridge and Tower Bridge
2016	"Pretty If You Smile"	The Meow Meows	Melanie Light	Shoreditch
2017	"Ahoto"	Mou Sultana	Luca Roccini	Camden
2017	"Don't Delete The Kisses"	Wolf Alice		London Underground
2017	"Enemy"	Janice Vidal	Jude Chen	
2018	"Solo"	Jennie	Han Sa-min	Hayes
2019	"Stormzy"	Vossi Bop	Henry Scholfield	
2020	"Numb"	Elderbrook	Aldona Kwiatkowski	Shoreditch
2020	"Lighter"	Nathan Dawe ft. KSI		Docklands / Crossharbour
2020	"Casson"	The Rubin		Waterloo station
2022	"Mimi Barks"	UNDEAD IT		OmegaWorks / Harringay
2022	"i see london i see france"	Bbno$	Shiraz Higgins	
2022	"As It Was"	Harry Styles		Barbican Centre; Penguin Pool, London Zoo; Royal Horticultural Hall
2024	"Thank You Postman"	Ian Chan	Rony Kong	near Big Ben
2024	"Old Jeff"	Jeffrey Ngai	Blair Chan	Westminster Bridge, Tower Bridge and London Underground

== See also ==
Media related to Music in London at Wikimedia Commons

- List of films set in London
- List of television shows set in London
- List of songs about London
