= Joanne Leonard =

American photographer, photo collage artist, and feminist

- Born: 1940 (age 85–86); Los Angeles, CA - U.S.A.
- Education: Photography
- Known for: photographs, photo collages
- Works: Romanticism is Ultimately Fatal, Father and Daughter, West Oakland, CA, Not Losing Her Memory, Newspaper Diary: Trompe l'Oeil Photographs

Joanne Leonard is an American photographer, photo collage artist, and feminist based in Ann Arbor, Michigan. Her work has been included in major art history textbooks and has been shown internationally in galleries and museums.

== Early life ==
Joanne Leonard was born in Los Angeles in 1940 to P. Alfred Leonard, originally of Mannheim, Germany, and Marjorie Rosenfeld Leonard. She has a twin sister, Eleanor (Rubin), who is also an artist, and a younger sister, Barbara (Handelman). She received a B.A. in Social Science from the University of California in 1962. As infants, she and her twin sister were cast as a baby in the film The Lady Is Willing starring Marlene Dietrich.

== Career ==
Leonard is known for her photographs and photo collages depicting private moments and personal struggles from women's lives once considered either taboo or unimportant. Her work struck a chord with the art world in the later part of the 20th century, and she was one of the few female artists to be featured in the 3rd edition of H.W. Janson’s History of Art. Her photograph, Julia and the Window of Vulnerability was chosen to illustrate the opening of the chapter, "The Modern World" in the 1991 edition of Gardner's Art Through the Ages.

She was an official photographer for the 1972 Winter Olympics.

She taught art and interdisciplinary courses at the University of Michigan’s Penny W. Stamps School of Art & Design and now holds the title of Diane M. Kirkpatrick and Griselda Pollock Distinguished University Professor Emerita. She has one daughter, Julia.

Leonard's influence on the field of photography has been for creating images of objects, places, and people from women’s realms and private spaces—from a woman’s own perspective. A large body of her work is in photo collage, made with the goal of juxtaposing the intimate with social questions or political issues that are circulating today in the world. She is also known for distinguished photo collage work as well.

== Collections ==
Leonard's work is held by major collections, including:

- International Center of Photography in New York City
- Iris & B. Gerald Cantor Center for Visual Arts at Stanford University in Stanford, California
- Los Angeles County Museum of Art
- The Metropolitan Museum of Art
- Museum of Modern Art (MoMA) in New York, which holds 62 of her photographs, all of which are digitized and available on their website
- National Gallery of Art, Washington, D. C.
- San Francisco Museum of Modern Art (SFMOMA)
- University of Michigan Museum of Art
- Victoria & Albert Museum
- Whitney Museum of American Art

== Quotations ==
- I built a darkroom when I could have fixed up a kitchen.
- My camera has always sought the beauty and light in a moment.
- Feminism is a tool for looking at what's missing.
- The making of the work, as miserable as I was (and it was a miserable time for me), was also a time of great excitement because I was doing something I had actually never seen before. I was finding ways to represent something I had no idea how to do.
- Anne Frank's Diary, for all the horror it conveyed, also said that a young girl's thoughts, and life, and everyday events could be important.

== Videos ==
- Joanne Leonard: A Life in Pictures by the University of Michigan Press
- Collecting Conversations: Joanne Leonard, part of the Ransom Center series "Collecting Conversations: Five Women in American Photography" by the University of Texas at Austin
- Vimeo link- screen test for Twins: Joanne and Eleanor at Columbia Studios in Hollywood 1941

https://vimeo.com/1092564489/466bc71ca1?share=copy

== Bibliography ==
=== Photographic Memoirs ===
- Being in pictures: an intimate photo memoir. Ann Arbor: University of Michigan Press. 2008. ISBN 978-0-47211-402-3.
- Newspaper Diary: Trompe l’Oeil Photographs, with essays by Amanda Krugliak and Wendy Kozol, University of Michigan Institute for the Humanities, 10 color plates, 5 incidental figures, with essays, 2 details in endpapers, 20 pages. 2012.

=== Manuscript ===
- Woman by Three. Menlo Park. Pacific Coast Publishers. 1969. First Edition. Illustrated by monochrome photographs.

== Works from 1960s - present ==
- Early Work - Haight-Ashbury, San Francisco, 1963
- West Oakland – 1963-72
- Family and Friends – 1962 - present
- High School Drum Corps - 1966
- Journal of a Miscarriage - 1973. A series of 30 prints featuring photo-collages, which depict a miscarriage, fertility and reproductive issues - in the collection of the Victoria & Albert Museum - UK
- Julia (daughter) with concentration - 1975-95 and sporadically, continuing to present
- Interiors – 1977-early 1980s. Home interiors photographed in conjunction with Human Arts and Technology (HAT) – a project funded by National Endowment of the Arts (NEA) Photography Surveys grant. Ultimately, the series incorporated images made earlier in the 1960s in West Oakland.
- Not Losing Her Memory (photographs and collages focusing on women in Leonard's family and her mother’s memory loss – 1980s and 1990s
- Roots and Wings - 1980s and 1990s
- Newspaper Diary Series – 2006 - present

== Exhibitions ==
- Reproductive: Health, Fertility, Agency at Museum of Contemporary Photography, 19 Jan – 23 May 2021
- National Gallery of Art: The ’70s Lens: Reimagining Documentary Photography, 6 Oct 2024 – 6 Apr 2025, and related feature 12 Documentary Photographers Who Changed the Way We See the World
- HackelBury: Joanne Leonard: Vintage Photographs and Early Collages, 29 May - 8 Jul 2025
