= Suede (singer) =

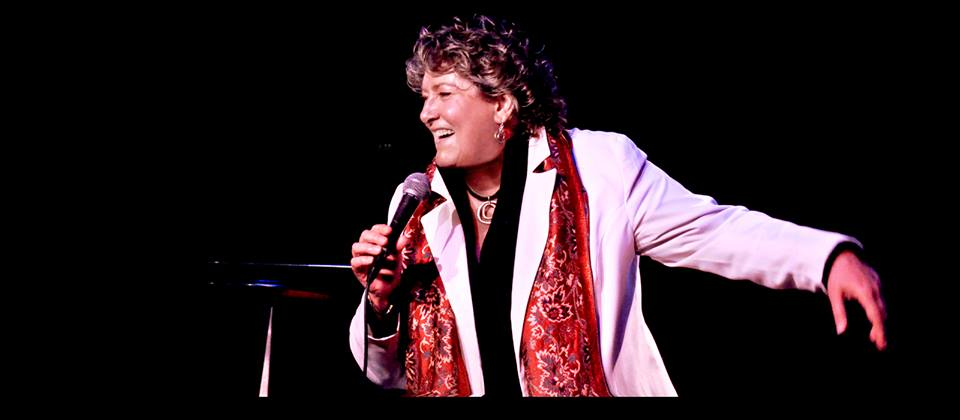

Background information
- Born: Nyack, New York, United States
- Genres: Pop; jazz
- Occupation: Musician
- Website: www.facebook.com/suedewave

Suede is an American pop and jazz singer. A well known artist in the LGBTQ community, she has an entry in An Encyclopaedia of Gay and Lesbian Recordings (1992).

== Life and career ==
She was born in Nyack, New York, moved around throughout childhood from NY to the midwest and back, graduating from senior high school in Severna Park, Maryland before college at Wartburg College in Iowa. Self-taught since childhood and until college, she started at the approximate age of 4 years old on the piano, began busking music in high school, getting bar gigs before she even graduated. She lived in Baltimore for the majority of the 1980s and became a fixture at many local clubs in the Baltimore, DC, VA, PA circuit and beyond as she began to build her national touring schedule. Suede's popularity steadily increased and she began playing sold-out shows in some of the US's most respected concert halls and jazz clubs (Birdland, Feinsteins, Kennedy Center, Birchmere, etc.), sharing the stage with fellow headliners such as Melissa Etheridge and Sarah McLachlan, and opening for Janis Ian and Joan Rivers, among others. She began her own record/touring label in 1983, Easily Suede Music, and has toured consistently nationally and internationally since. She currently has 4 CDs and 1 DVD released on the Easily Suede label. Her DVD Suede, Live at Scullers Jazz Club aired on 54 stations nationally as part of the PBS fund-drive. Her recording of Shirley Eikhard's song "Emily Remembers" became the #1 song of the year on WJZW Radio, Washington, DC. Each of her recordings have sold upwards of 10,000 copies with national distribution and airplay.

In 1992, Suede released her second album Barely Blue. Writing in The Washington Post, music critic Mike Joyce stated, "Virtually all the songs are redeemed by Suede's appealing soprano voice and articulate phrasing. There's more than a little Streisand in her thoughtful approach to a lyric."

Suede successfully sued Sony Music, Columbia Records and Nude Records in 1993 for trademark violation for introducing and representing the British band Suede in the US without doing a required preliminary trademark check with the Library of Congress. The two parties reached a settlement, after two years in legal process, resulting in an agreement that the band's albums would only be promoted and sold in the US under the name "The London Suede".

In addition to being a vocalist, Suede plays multiple instruments; trumpet, piano, and guitar and is well known for her humor and quick wit in her live shows. She currently lives on Cape Cod.

Suede also toured for 2 years with the Flirtations, seen in the Jonathan Demme film Philadelphia and was on the group's final album, Three.

== Sources ==
- Considine, J.D. (February 5, 1994). "Jazz singer Suede keeps things smooth". The Baltimore Sun.
- Desautels, Gerry (October 17, 2002). "Delivering the smooth, sensual sounds of Suede". Provincetown Banner. Archived from the original on 2004-06-19.
- Harrington, Richard (February 2, 1994). "Still The One AND Only American Suede". The Washington Post.
- Harrington, Richard (May 4, 2001). "SUEDE; On the Day We Met". The Washington Post. p. I6.
- McLaren, Jay (1992). "Suede". An encyclopaedia of gay and lesbian recordings. Amsterdam. p. 89.
- Rubien, David (April 5, 2009). "Singers wrestled Sony Corp. over names and won". San Francisco Chronicle.
- SFBT Staff Reporter (September 15, 2016). "Pop, Jazz and Blues Diva Suede Continues to Defy Stereotypes as Mainstream Discovers Longtime LGBT Favorite". San Francisco Bay Times.
- "Suede serenades next weekend in Cotuit". The Barnstable Patriot. July 11, 2021.
