= Charing Cross tube station =

London Underground station

Charing Cross
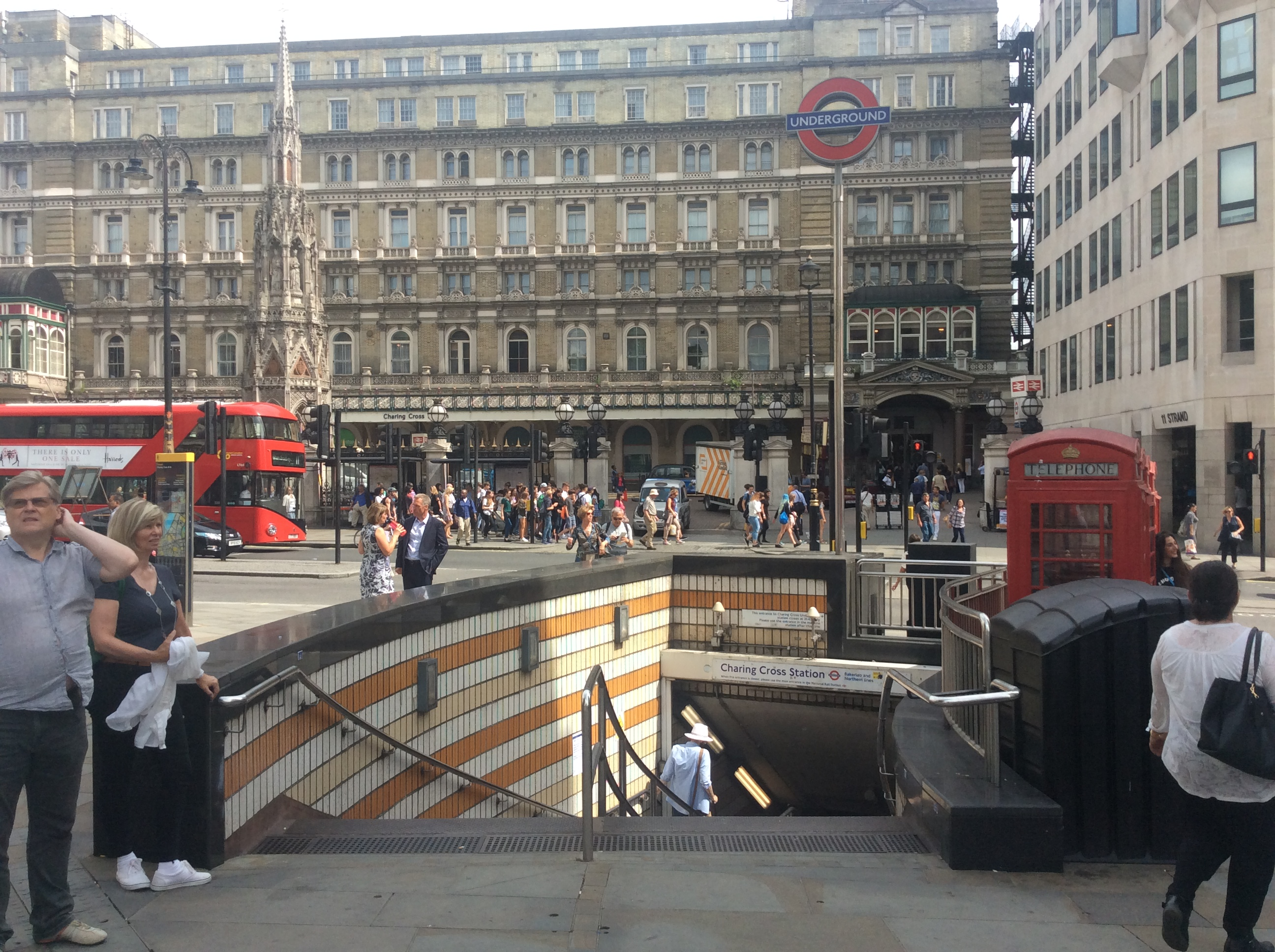
- Station entrance at Strand/Duncannon Street
- Interactive map of Charing Cross

General information
- Location: Charing Cross
- Local authority: City of Westminster
- Managed by: London Underground
- Owner: London Underground
- Number of platforms: 6 (4 in use)
- Fare zone: 1
- OSI: Charing Cross

London Underground annual entry and exit
- 2021: ▲7.15 million
- 2022: ▲13.66 million
- 2023: ▲14.48 million
- 2024: ▲15.81 million
- 2025: ▼14.71 million

Railway companies
- Original company: Baker Street and Waterloo Railway; Charing Cross, Euston and Hampstead Railway

Key dates
- 10 March 1906: Opened (BS&WR)
- 22 June 1907: Opened (CCE&HR)
- 6 April 1914: Extended (CCE&HR)
- 16 June 1973: Closed (Northern line)
- 1 May 1979: Opened (Jubilee line); Reopened (Northern line)
- 19 November 1999: Closed Permanently (Jubilee line)

Other information
- External links: TfL station info page
- Coordinates: 51°30′29″N 0°7′29″W

Charing Cross (Note: Sometimes informally abbreviated as Charing +, Charing X, CHX or CH+) (/ˈtʃærɪŋ ˈkrɒs/) is a London Underground station at Charing Cross in the City of Westminster. It is served by the Bakerloo and Northern lines, and provides an interchange with its mainline station above. It served the Jubilee line from 1979 to 1999. On the Bakerloo line, the station is between Piccadilly Circus and Embankment stations. On its branch of the Northern line, it is between Leicester Square and Embankment stations. The station is in London fare zone 1.

Charing Cross was originally two separate stations, known for most of their existence as Trafalgar Square (on the Bakerloo line) and Strand (on the Northern line). The Bakerloo line platforms were opened by the Baker Street and Waterloo Railway in 1906 and the Northern line platforms by the Charing Cross, Euston and Hampstead Railway in 1907.

In the 1970s, in preparation for the opening of the Jubilee line, the two earlier stations were connected together with new below ground passageways. When the Jubilee line platforms opened in 1979, the combined station was given its current name. Charing Cross was the eastern terminus of the Jubilee line, but services ended in 1999 when the line was extended from Westminster to Stratford.

The station has entrances in Trafalgar Square, Strand, Villiers Street, Adelaide Street, William IV Street and in the mainline station. It is close to the National Gallery, the National Portrait Gallery, Admiralty Arch, St Martin-in-the-Fields, Canada House, South Africa House, the Savoy Hotel, The Mall, Northumberland Avenue and Whitehall.

As of 2024, Charing Cross is the 37th busiest station on the London Underground with 16.51 million passengers using it per year.

== History ==
=== Planning ===
From the 1860s to the 1900s numerous schemes for underground railways through central London were proposed, often using similar routes. (Note: Planning, funding and construction of railways was a matter of private enterprise. Each new railway line needed parliamentary permission and a private bill had to be submitted to Parliament for approval setting out its route, the land the company needed to purchase and an estimate of the construction costs. Once approval was granted by an act of parliament, the promoters would attempt to raise money to buy the land, construct the railway and buy the rolling stock to operate it.) Many of the schemes submitted to Parliament for approval as private bills included proposals for lines through the Charing Cross area with stations serving the South Eastern Railway's (SER's) Charing Cross mainline terminus and the area around Trafalgar Square.

==== 1860s and 1870s ====
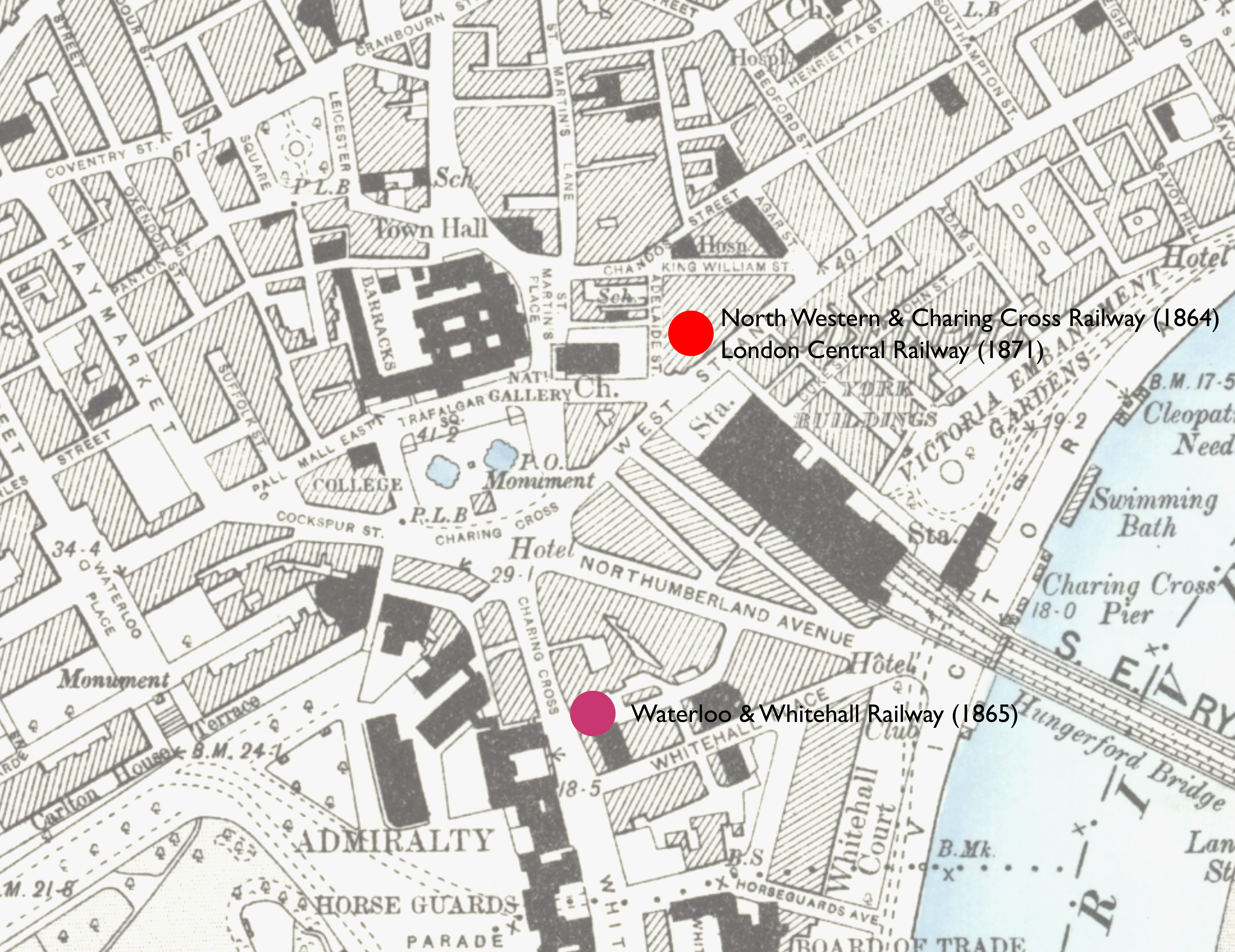
Map showing proposed station sites, 1860s and 1870s

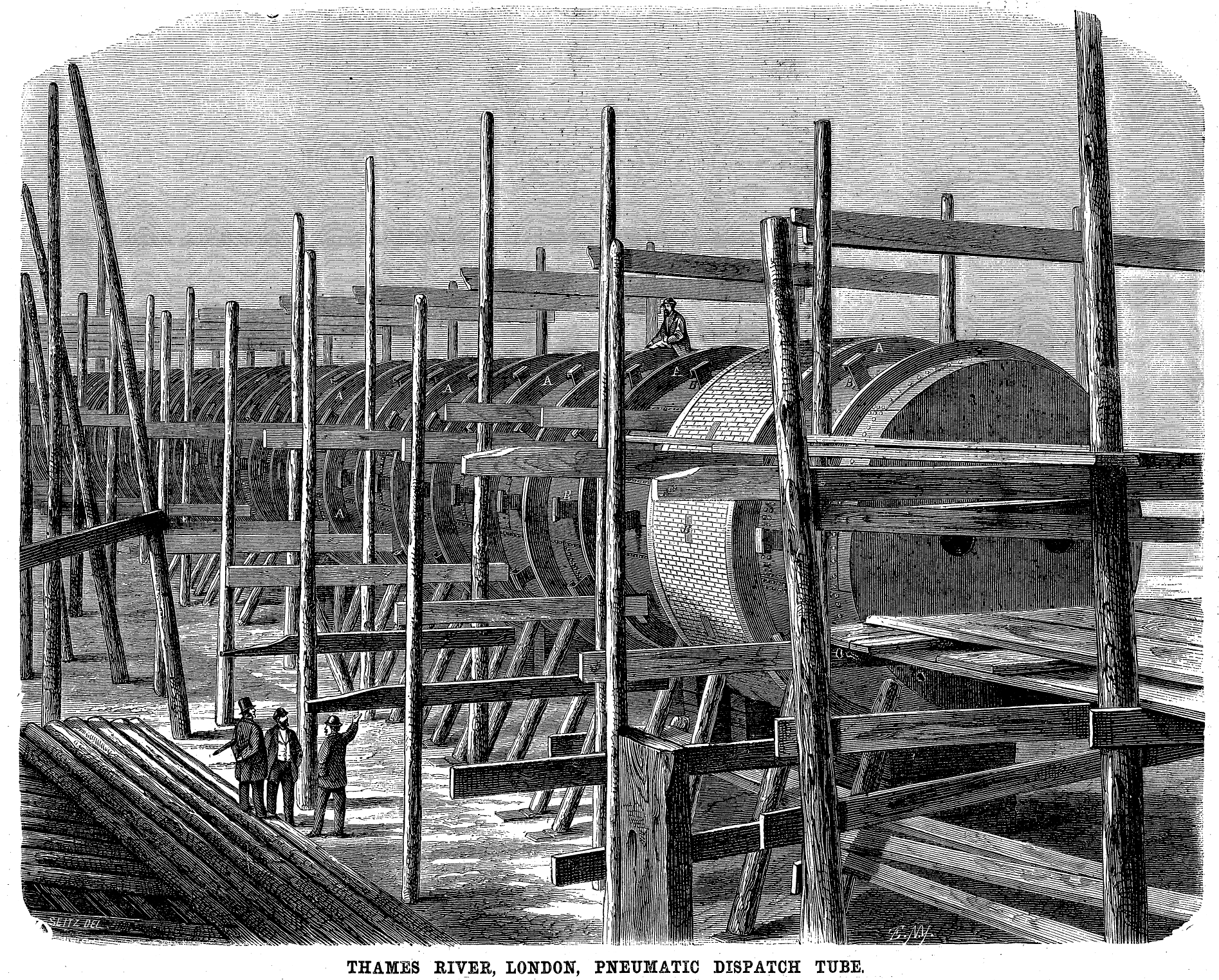
Sections of the Waterloo & Whitehall Railway's iron tube under construction

The first proposal came before Parliament in 1864, a year after the opening of the Metropolitan Railway, the world's first underground railway, and the year the mainline station opened. The North Western and Charing Cross Railway (NW&CCR) proposed a line in a cut-and-cover tunnel between the London and North Western Railway's terminus at Euston and Charing Cross. The NW&CCR was to have its own station on the north side of Strand before it came to the surface alongside the main line station and connected to the SER's tracks on Hungerford Bridge. The railway was approved in July 1864.

The following year, the Waterloo and Whitehall Railway (W&WR) received permission to construct a short railway between Waterloo station and a station at the western end of Great Scotland Yard at the junction with Whitehall. The line was to be a pneumatic railway with the carriages sucked and pushed through the tunnels like a piston by fans at Waterloo. Construction works began for the ends of the cut and cover tunnels on each side of the River Thames and part of the cast-iron cylinder that was to be sunk into a trench dredged into the bed of the river.

Progress on both railways was halted in the Panic of 1866, a major crash in the London and international markets that led to the collapse of a number of banks and prevented funds being raised to continue the works. The W&WR was liquidated in 1868, and the NW&CCR plans were abandoned in 1869.

The NW&CCR plans were revived with minor changes by the Euston, St Pancras and Charing Cross Railway in 1870. A station was planned at the same location as the NW&CCR's. Parliamentary approval was granted in 1871 and the company changed its name to the London Central Railway, but the scheme was again unable to raise sufficient funds. It was abandoned in 1874.

==== 1880s ====
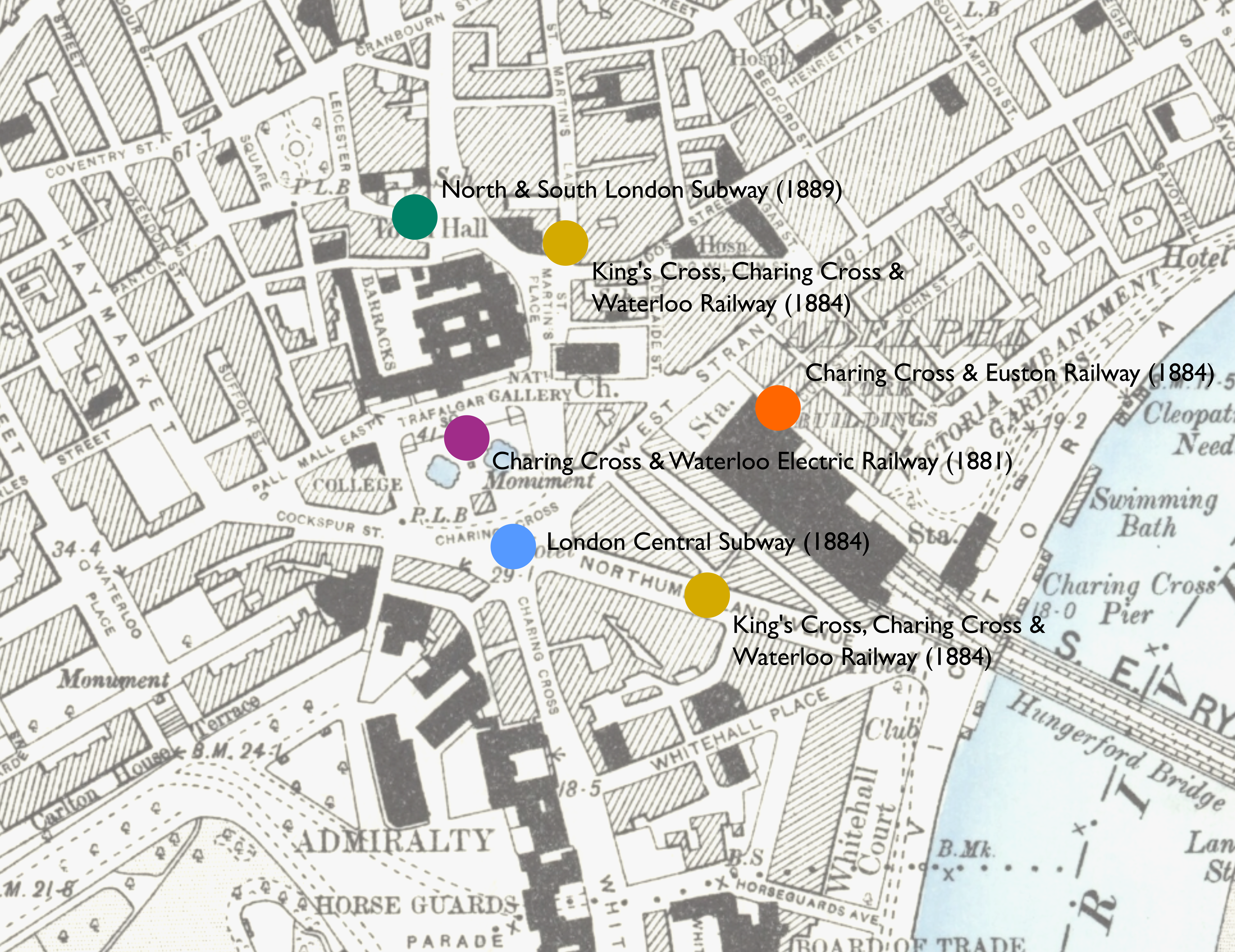
Map showing proposed station sites, 1880s

In 1881, the Central Metropolitan Railway proposed a cut-and-cover line running from Parliament Square to St Pancras. At the southern end, the line was to run under Whitehall, Trafalgar Square and St Martin's Lane, though the location of the station was not recorded. The section under Whitehall was opposed by the government and it was removed so that the line was to terminate at Charing Cross, but the whole scheme was rejected by Parliament in 1882.

Another proposal in 1881 was the Charing Cross and Waterloo Electric Railway (CC&WER). The proposal was similar to the W&WR's 17 years earlier; a short line running in iron pipes sunk into the river bed connecting Waterloo station to the north side of the river, this time to a station 20 feet (6.1 m) under Trafalgar Square. The scheme was the first in the UK to propose the use of electric traction for its trains and was supported by Sir William Siemens whose electrical engineering company Siemens Brothers was to provide the electrical equipment. (Note: William Siemens' brother Werner von Siemens had demonstrated the first electric railway in Berlin in 1879.) The CC&WER was approved in August 1882. A proposal to extend the route to the City of London was submitted to Parliament later that year, but was withdrawn the following year as the company struggled to raise funds. In 1883, the London Central Electric Railway, proposed an extension of the CC&WER; this time from the Charing Cross end with the line running to the General Post Office at St Martin's Le Grand. The plan was rejected. William Siemens died in 1883 and the CC&WER plan was abandoned in 1885.

In 1884, proposals were made for two cut-and-cover lines to link Charing Cross with one of the northern terminals. The first proposal, the Charing Cross and Euston Railway, proposed a line between those two stations. At Charing Cross a terminal station was to be provided under Villiers Street which was to be closed to allow a separate branch to rise to the surface to cross the river on a new bridge adjacent to Hungerford bridge before connecting to the SER's tracks south of the river. The bill was withdrawn in February 1885. The second proposal, the London Central Subway, proposed connecting Charing Cross and King's Cross. The station at Charing Cross was to be beneath the south side of Trafalgar Square 18 feet 9 inches (5.72 m) below ground. The government's Office of Works objected to the proposed alignment on the north side of Trafalgar Square because it believed the tunnels would compromise the foundations of the National Gallery. The bill was withdrawn in April 1885.

Also in 1884, the King's Cross, Charing Cross and Waterloo Subway submitted a proposal to construct a line linking the three mainline terminals in its name. Unlike the earlier schemes and those of the Charing Cross and Euston Railway and London Central Subway, the company planned to construct its line at a deeper level with the tunnels constructed using a tunnelling shield and lined with cast-iron segments. The stations were to be constructed using the cut-and-cover technique with one platform above the other. Two stations were to be constructed close to Charing Cross: one to the south at the junction of Northumberland Avenue and Northumberland Street and one to the north in St Martin's Place. (Note: The first example of this form of tunnelling was the Tower Subway opened in 1870. Its engineer, James Henry Greathead, was the engineer for the King's Cross, Charing Cross and Waterloo Subway and also the City and South London Subway which was about to start construction between King William Street in the City of London and Elephant & Castle. The City and South London Subway, later renamed the City and South London Railway, opened in 1890 and is now part of the Northern line's Morden and Bank branches.) The bill was withdrawn in May 1885.

In 1889, the North and South London Subway was proposed. It was to connect Camden Town and Elephant & Castle, and proposed a station north of the National Gallery at the junction of Charing Cross Road and Green Street (now Irving Street). The bill was announced, but was not submitted to parliament.

==== 1890s ====
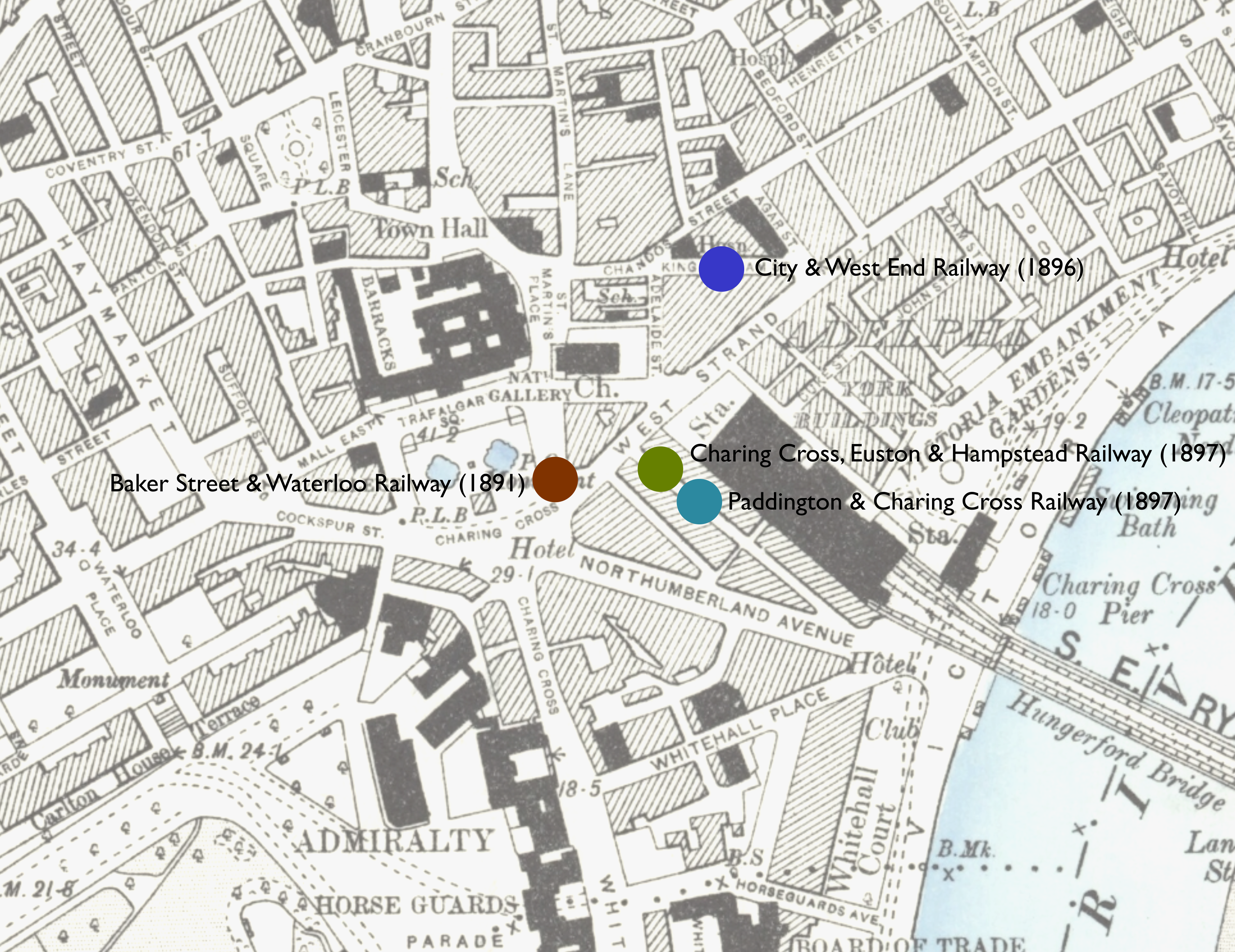
Map showing proposed station sites, 1890s

Following the successful opening in 1890 of the City and South London Railway (C&SLR), the first deep-level tube railway and the first underground railway using electric traction, a number of railways were proposed in London to be constructed and operated by similar means. In 1891, two bills were submitted for tube railways that were to serve Charing Cross: the Baker Street & Waterloo Railway (BS&WR) and the Hampstead, St Pancras & Charing Cross Railway (HStP&CCR).

The BS&WR was to connect Baker Street and Waterloo station and the HStP&CCR was to connect Hampstead with Charing Cross with a branch to Euston, St Pancras and King's Cross. The former company's station was to be under Trafalgar Square and the latter's was to be at the junction of King William Street (now William IV Street) and Agar Street with a pedestrian subway under Strand to the forecourt of the mainline station. (Note: The HStP&CCR's tunnels were to continue beyond Agar Street under Strand as far as Exeter Street.) After a committee sat to consider these and the various other railways being proposed, the BS&WR was approved in March 1893 and the HStP&CCR, renamed to the Charing Cross, Euston and Hampstead Railway (CCE&HR), was approved in August 1893. The BS&WR and the CCE&HR would become the first two lines through Charing Cross to be completed, though it was several years before construction began on either line.

In 1896, the City and West End Railway proposed a route running between Cannon Street in the City of London and Hammersmith via the West End and Knightsbridge. A station for Charing Cross was to be provided at King William Street. The company's east–west route would have been competition for a number of other lines that had been permitted but which had not yet opened: the under construction Central London Railway (CLR), the Metropolitan District Railway's (MDR's) proposed deep level line and the Brompton and Piccadilly Circus Railway's (B&PCR's) line. Lobbying from these companies led to the City and West End Railway bill being rejected in April 1897.

The final new scheme of the 1890s was the Paddington and Charing Cross Railway's proposal in 1897 to link these two mainline stations. Its station at Charing Cross was to be under and parallel with Craven Street on the south side of the main line station. When the bill was first considered in January 1898, the promoters failed to attend Parliament to support it and the bill was declared "dead".

Also in 1897, the CCE&HR submitted a bill to change the route of the final section of its line. Instead of turning east at the end of Charing Cross Road to Agar Street and Strand, the route was revised to run south past Trafalgar Square to end at a station under Craven Street. The change was approved in July 1898 and the previous routing was abandoned.

==== 1900s ====
Like the opening of the C&SLR ten years earlier, the successful opening of the CLR in 1900 spurred another set of proposals for new lines with routes criss-crossing London. (Note: The Central London Railway opened on 30 July 1900 and by the end of the year private bills for twelve underground railway lines had been submitted to Parliament for consideration. Five were extensions of earlier proposals and seven were completely new companies.)

===== 1901 =====
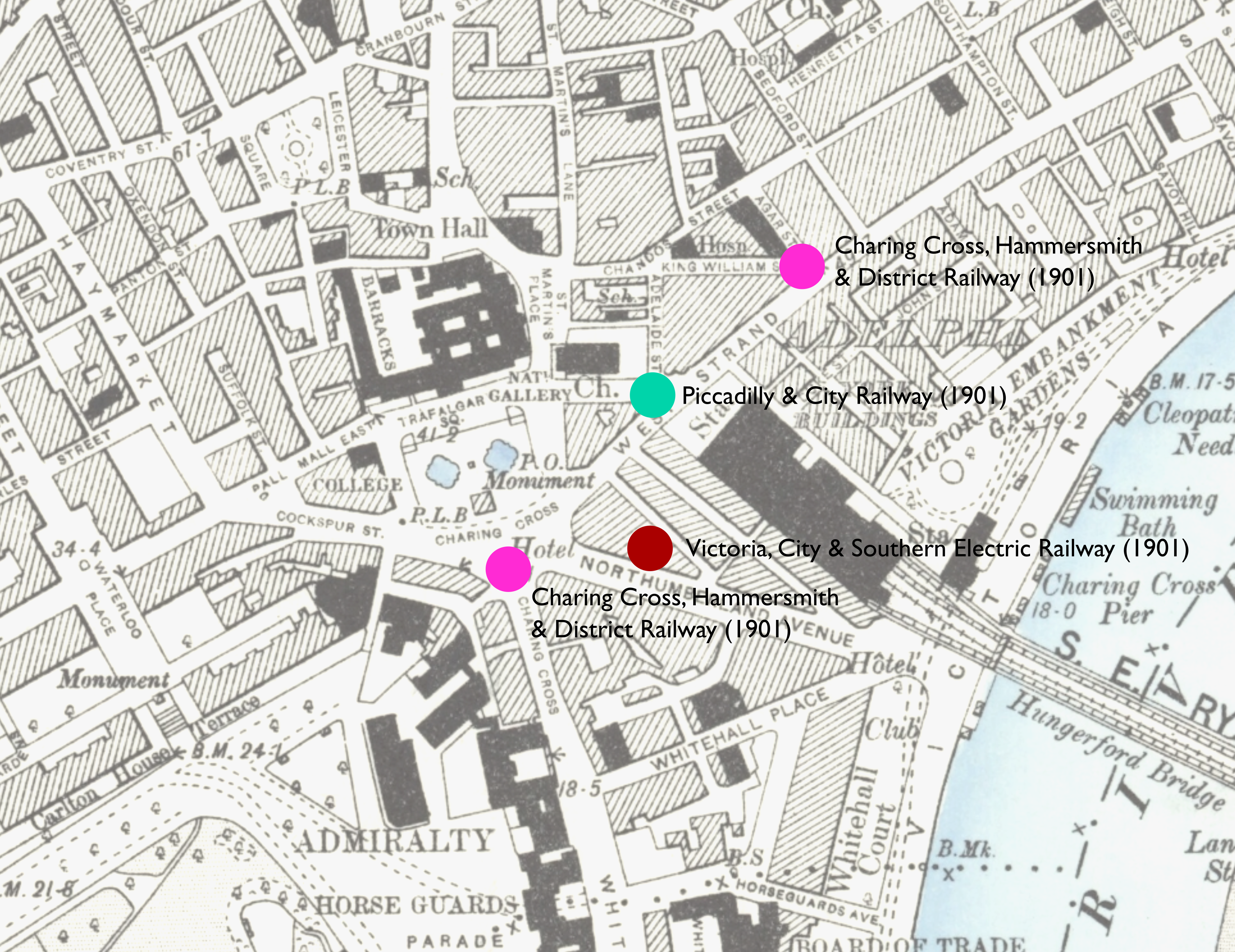
Map showing proposed station sites, 1901

Proposals for the 1901 parliamentary session that planned to serve Charing Cross included three new lines and the extension of one already approved.

The Charing Cross, Hammersmith and District Railway (CCH&DR) proposed a line from just north of Charing Cross to Hammersmith via Knightsbridge and Kensington. Two stations were planned around Trafalgar Square: one to the north-east at Bedfordbury with its entrance probably to be located at the junction of Agar Street and Strand; the other on the south side of the Square.

The Piccadilly and City Railway (P&CR) proposed a line from Piccadilly Circus to Cannon Street. It planned to connect to other companies' lines at each end. The P&CR's station at Charing Cross was to be on the east side of Adelaide Street at the junction with Strand.

The Victoria, City and Southern Electric Railway proposed a line from Pimlico to Peckham Rye connecting Victoria with the City, Southwark and south-east London. Its tunnels would have run between Whitehall and Strand with a station to the south-west of the mainline station. The promoters failed to appear before the parliamentary committee and the bill was declared "dead" in January 1901.

The CCE&HR submitted a bill for an extension of its approved route south from Charing Cross to Westminster and Victoria.

To review all these bills and the others submitted for underground lines in London, Parliament established a joint committee under Lord Windsor. By the time the committee had produced its report, (Note: The Windsor Committee made a number of recommendations on the schemes it had reviewed and on underground railways in general.) the 1901 parliamentary session was almost over so the promoters of the bills were asked to resubmit them for the 1902 session.

===== 1902 =====
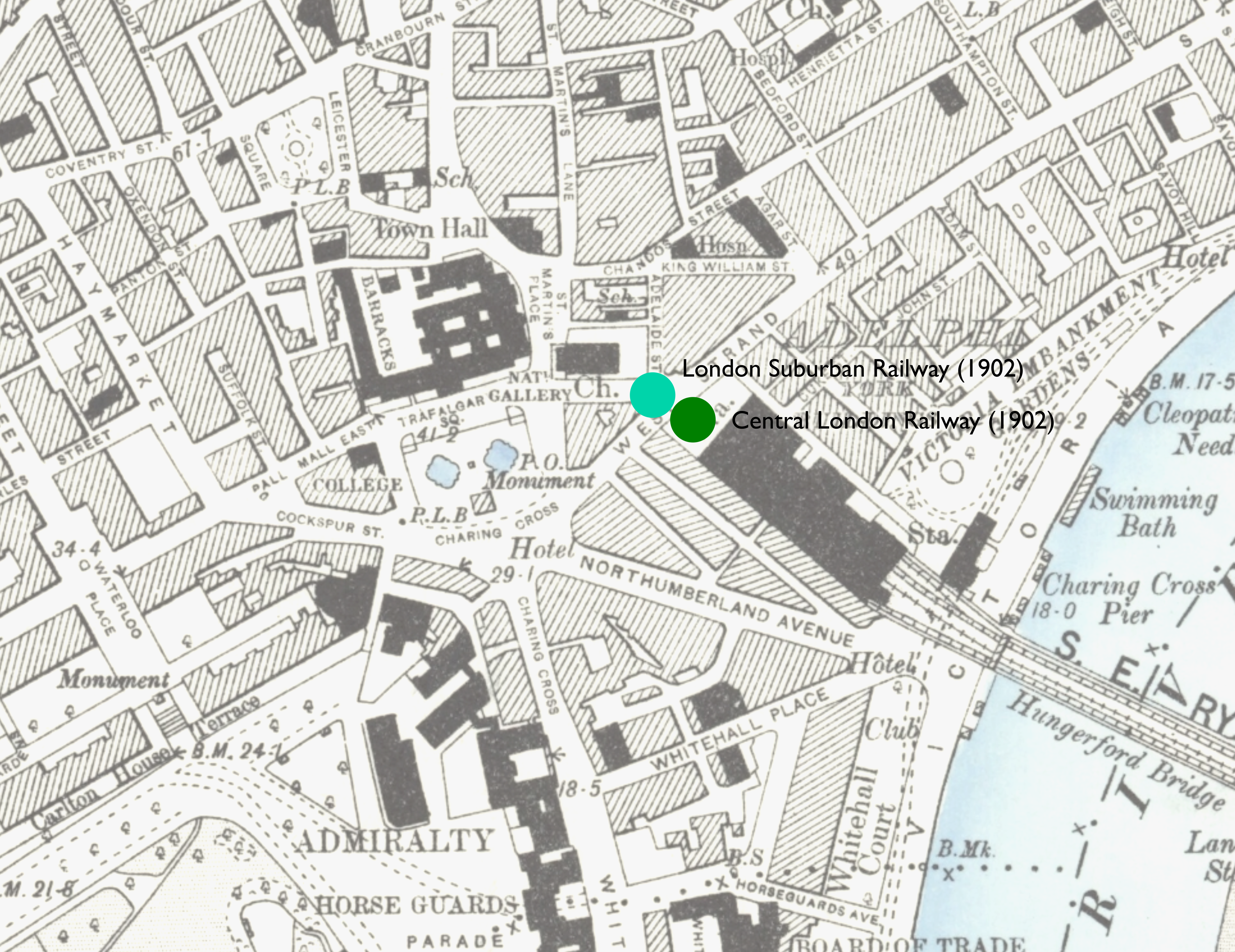
Map showing proposed station sites, 1902

The 1902 session saw an increase in the number of bills submitted for tube railways in London. (Note: Thirty-two bills from 23 companies were announced in November 1901 for the 1902 parliamentary session. One of these was not submitted and three were withdrawn by January 1902. A number of the additional proposals included plans for services through the Charing Cross area.) The CCE&HR, CCH&DR and P&CR bills from 1901 were resubmitted along with new bills from the CCE&HR, the CLR and the B&PCR and from a newcomer, the London United Electric Railway (LUER). To manage the workload of reviewing all of the bills, two joint committees were established, one under Lord Windsor and the other under Lord Ribblesdale. (Note: The Windsor Committee reviewed bills for routes running east-west and the Ribblesdale Committee considered routes running north-south.)

The Ribblesdale Committee considered the CCE&HR bills and rejected the extension to Victoria as being not in compliance with Commons standing orders. (Note: Rules and procedures known as standing orders existed covering the presentation of private bills to Parliament, and a failure to comply with these could result in a bill's rejection. Standing orders for railway bills included requirements to publish a notice of intention to submit the bill in the London Gazette in the November of the preceding year, to submit maps and plans of the route to various interested parties, to provide an estimate of the cost and to deposit 5% of the estimated cost into the Court of Chancery.) The new CCE&HR bill proposed a short extension of the line southwards beneath the SER's station to the MDR's Charing Cross station (now Embankment) to provide an interchange with that line and the BS&WR. It was approved in November 1892.

The other bills affecting Charing Cross were considered by the Windsor Committee. Several of these involved tunnels between Charing Cross and Piccadilly Circus and, either independently or in conjunction with other companies' proposals, formed parts of routes connection Charing Cross to Hammersmith. Although it did not plan a station in the vicinity of Strand or Trafalgar Square, the B&PCR proposal for a short line to connect its planned station at Piccadilly Circus and the MDR's planned deep-level platforms at its Charing Cross station would have required tunnels to run one above the other, south under Adelaide Street and Craven Street on the south-west side of the mainline station before turning east into Northumberland Avenue and north under Victoria Embankment to connect to the MDR's planned tunnels. (Note: A B&PCR interchange station would have been constructed at the MDR end of the link.) The link was rejected on engineering grounds.

The CLR proposal was for a second line to connect its two existing termini at Shepherds' Bush and Bank via a more southerly route to form a deep-level loop. (Note: One of the reasons for the loop line was to reduce the interval between trains. The CLR was operated with locomotive-hauled trains and it took at least 2.5 minutes to change these at the termini. A loop would allow trains to run continuously without delay for the change over.) At Charing Cross, the new line would have run under Strand, then north-west past Trafalgar Square towards Piccadilly Circus. The CCH&DR bill reintroduced its Charing Cross to Hammersmith scheme from the previous year and proposed an additional connection to the P&CR at Agar Street. The entirety of the CCH&DR scheme and the majority of the CLR scheme, including all of the southern loop line, were rejected by parliament.

The P&CR proposal was amended from the previous year to run beyond Piccadilly Circus to Hammersmith. This required its platforms at Charing Cross to be deeper than in its previous scheme. The LUER was promoted by the London United Tramways (LUT) and also planned to run between Hammersmith and Charing Cross. Approaching from the west beneath The Mall, at Charing Cross the line was to form a loop running from the Duke of York Column at the south end of Waterloo Place, under Trafalgar Square to the corner of Duncannon Street and Strand before turning south to run under the mainline station to the junction of Northumberland Avenue and Whitehall Place before running west to complete the loop. Its station would have been located on the loop.

Mergers and amalgamations led to the P&CR and the LUER routes being joined into a combined scheme, the London Suburban Railway (LSR). (Note: The P&CR amalgamated with the NELR to form the Piccadilly, City and North East London Railway (PC&NELR) combining the proposed routes of the P&CR from Hammersmith to Ludgate Hill and the NELR from Ludgate Hill to Southgate. A third proposed scheme, the City and North Eastern Suburban Electric Railway, from Cannon Street to Waltham Cross was also included in the LSR arrangements. All of the proposals were to be funded by J.S. Morgan & Co. The LSR was to use the LUER's route from Hammersmith to Hyde Park Corner and then the PC&NELR's route eastwards. The unneeded sections of the two companies' proposals east and west of Hyde Park were removed from the combined scheme The LUER had proposed tunnels with a diameter of 12 feet (3.7 m), this was increased to 13 feet 3 inches (4.04 m) to match the PC&NELR's.) The LSR proposals were modified in a number of ways before bills were ready at the end of July 1902 for a third and final reading. (Note: Although forming parts of an interconnected scheme, the LUER and the PC&NELR parts were covered by separate bills.) At Charing Cross, a station building to be shared with the CCE&HR was to be located on the north side of Strand at the junction with Adelaide Street with a pedestrian subway under Strand connecting to the mainline station. While the bills were awaiting their final readings, the LUT was taken over by Speyer Brothers, the financiers of the rival Underground Electric Railways Company of London (UERL). (Note: The LUT had fallen out with J.S. Morgan & Co. over management of the LSR and the division of the ownership of the amalgamated operation.) The LUER's planned route was similar to that of the UERL-owned B&PCR. (Note: Construction of the B&PCR began in July 1902.) Under Speyer Brothers' control, the LUT withdrew the LUER bill and the remainder of the LSR proposals failed.

===== 1903–1906 =====
Fewer tube railway bills were proposed for the 1903 parliamentary session. Three bills included Charing Cross in their plans and were submitted by the CCE&HR, the CLR and the Great Northern, Piccadilly and Brompton Railway (GNP&BR). (Note: The Great Northern, Piccadilly and Brompton Railway was formed in 1902 through a merger of the B&PCR and the Great Northern and Strand Railway.) The CCE&HR bill provided for the purchase of additional land for its station. The CLR resubmitted its previous loop line bill unaltered expecting that the collapse of the LSR plans would improve its chance of success.

The GNP&BR proposed a modification of the previous year's B&PCR for a branch southwards from Piccadilly Circus. This time the branch would run under Leicester Square with platforms under King William Street and a station building at the junction of Agar Street and Strand. The tunnels would then turn eastwards under Strand to continue to Mansion House in the City of London where it would connect to the MDR's deep-level line. Between Piccadilly Circus and Ludgate Circus, the route was similar to the CLR's loop line proposal.

Neither of the bills proceeded as the Royal Commission on London Traffic was established on 10 February 1903 to consider future development of transport in London. During its deliberations consideration of any new proposals was suspended. After the Commission issued its report on 17 July 1905, an attempt was made to revive a bill that had been submitted too late for the 1903 session and had been waiting parliament's consideration since February 1903. The Hammersmith, City & North East London Railway (HC&NELR) was a re-presentation of the P&CR and NELR schemes running from Hammersmith to Palmers Green. A station was planned between Agar Street and Bedford Street. The bill was rejected for not complying with standing orders in 1905, and resubmitted for the 1906 session with the station moved to the junction of Agar Street and Strand. Again the bill was rejected for procedural reasons and it was not presented again. (Note: Although nothing more was done, the HC&NELR company continued to exist until it was dissolved in 1923.)

=== Construction and opening ===
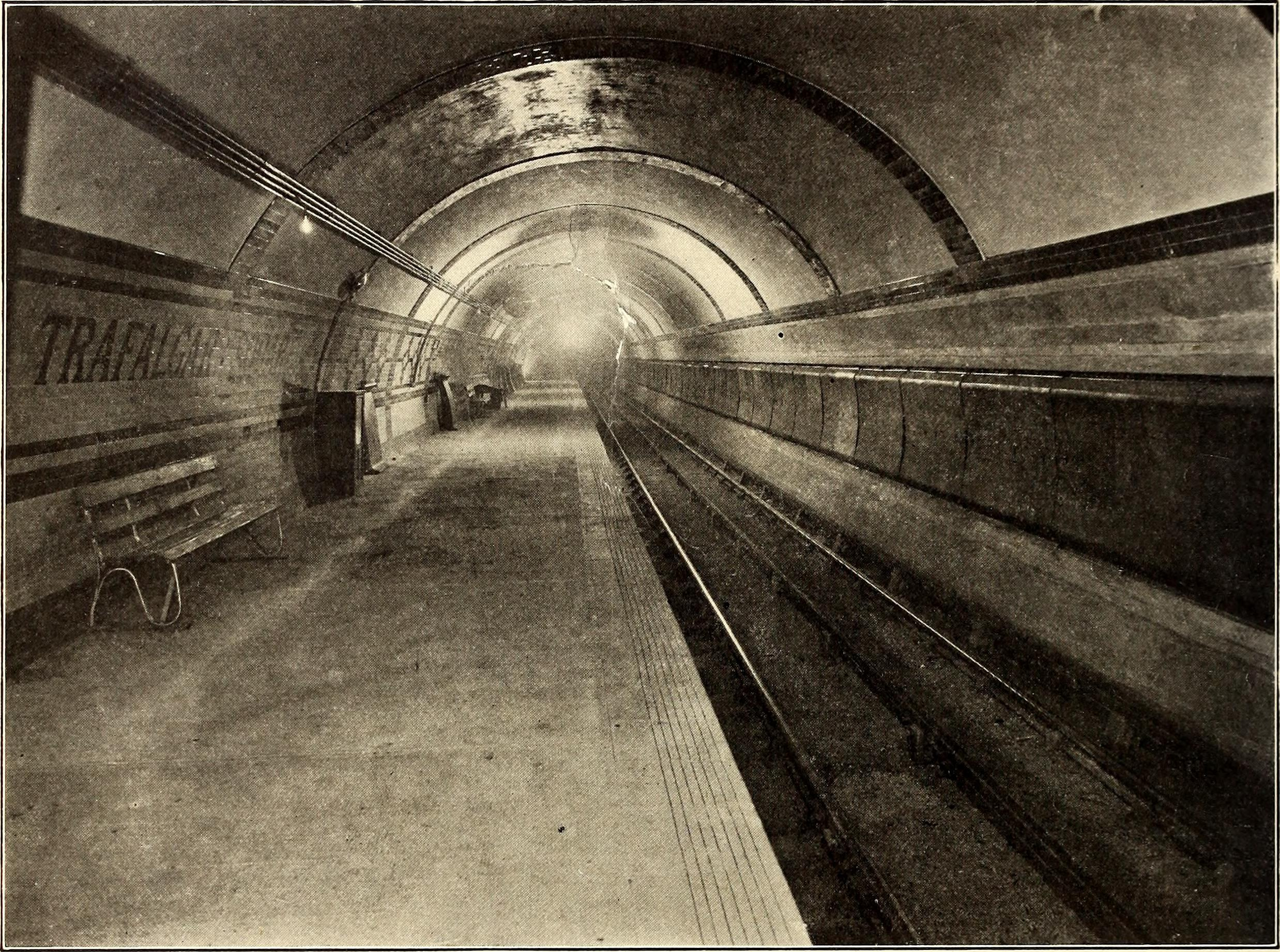
Platform of Trafalgar Square station, 1906

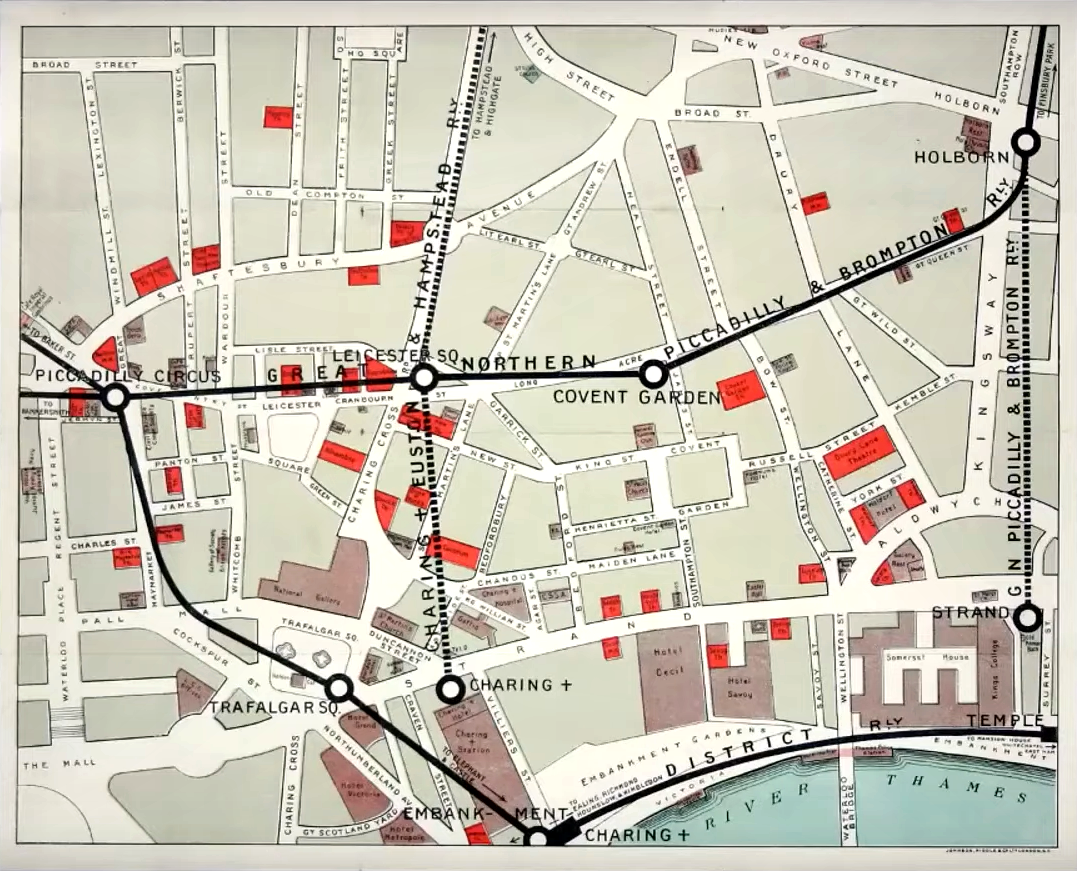
Map from 1907 showing Piccadilly, Hampstead, District and Bakerloo stations around Charing Cross

Construction of the BS&WR began in August 1898, with the boring of the tunnels under the River Thames beginning in February 1899. (Note: Works were carried out from two caissons sunk from a jetty into the bed of the river. The jetty received deliveries of tunnel sections and allowed excavated material to be removed by boat. Work below the river was carried out in compressed air to stop water seeping into the tunnel.) At the end of 1900, the collapse of the BS&WR's parent company, London & Globe Finance Corporation, put the railway company in financial difficulties. (Note: The collapse was because of fraud by its Managing Director Whitaker Wright who had manipulated the accounts of various subsidiaries to conceal losses from investors. Wright subsequently committed suicide by taking cyanide during his trial at the Royal Courts of Justice.) Tunnelling stopped in May 1901 with most of the running tunnels complete between Waterloo and the south end of Regent Street. At Trafalgar Square, the station tunnels had been excavated. In March 1902, the BS&WR was taken over by a consortium of investors led by Charles Yerkes. (Note: Yerkes' consortium already owned the CCE&HR, the GNP&BR and the MDR. These all became subsidiaries of the UERL the same year.) Works restarted under the new owners and 80 per cent of the tunnels were complete by March 1903.

Construction of the CCE&HR began in September 1903. Tunnelling under the mainline station was done in compressed air to prevent any damage from ground movements. (Note: Tunnelling in compressed air is used to reduce the risk of unstable, water-bearing or heavily loaded ground collapsing into the open face of the excavation. An airlock is constructed in the tunnel which allows the air pressure to be increased providing additional support to the ground above. Men and material pass through the airlock to ensure that the increased pressure is maintained.) The railway had permission to construct the underground station's ticket hall under part of the SER station's forecourt, but it was to be done from below to avoid disrupting the station. In December 1905, the roof of the mainline station collapsed and the station closed for three months for rebuilding. During this period, the CCE&HR was given permission to excavate the forecourt for six weeks. Works to construct a lift shaft and form the walls around the ticket hall were carried out with a grid of steel beams placed across the site onto which the forecourt surface was reconstructed. Excavation of the ticket hall and a second lift shaft were carried out from the roofed-over space.

Trafalgar Square station was provided with two 291-foot (89 m) long platforms. There was nowhere to place a surface building, so the station had a sub-surface ticket hall under the square. The ticket hall had three entrances: one at the south-east corner of the central area of the square, one on the corner of Strand and one on the east side of the square. Lifts manufactured by the Otis Elevator Company and a spiral stair connected the platforms and ticket hall. (Note: At other BS&WR stations with surface buildings, the lift winding gear was located on the first floor, without a surface building, the winding gear was placed at the bottom of the lift shaft.) Platform tiling at Trafalgar Square station was started in early 1904. (Note: The tiling scheme for BS&WR stations was originally going to be plain white tiles covering the walls and ceilings of the platform similar to the tiling used on the C&SLR and CLR. A decision was taken that all stations on the UERL-owned lines would have a unique patterned and coloured tiling scheme, but the northbound platform had already been tiled when the change was made and remained different from others on the line.) The CCE&HR station had two 350-foot (110 m) long platforms with the lifts again provided by Otis.

Trafalgar Square station opened when the BS&WR opened between Baker Street and Kennington Road on 10 March 1906. Charing Cross station opened as the southern terminus of the CCE&HR on 22 June 1907.

=== Extension and modifications ===
Changes in Station Names
	Charing Cross			Embankment		
	Bakerloo	Northern	Jubilee	District	Bakerloo	Northern
1870				Charing Cross		
1906	Trafalgar Square			Charing Cross	Embankment	
1907	Trafalgar Square	Charing Cross		Charing Cross	Embankment	
1914	Trafalgar Square	Charing Cross (Strand)		Charing Cross	Charing Cross (Embankment)	
1915	Trafalgar Square	Strand		Charing Cross		
1973	Trafalgar Square	~~Strand~~ (Closed)		Charing Cross		
1974	Trafalgar Square	~~Strand~~ (Closed)		Charing Cross Embankment		
1976	Trafalgar Square	~~Strand~~ (Closed)		Embankment		
1979	Charing Cross			Embankment		
1999	Charing Cross		~~Charing Cross~~ (Closed)	Embankment		

The BS&WR and CCE&HR stations were not connected below ground. To make interchanging between the lines easier, on 6 April 1914, the CCE&HR was extended south under the mainline station to provide an interchange with the BS&WR and the MDR. (Note: The CCE&HR extension was constructed as a single tunnel running south from Charing Cross as a loop under the River Thames and back. A single platform was constructed on the northbound return section of the loop.) For the opening of the extension, the CCE&HR station was renamed Charing Cross (Strand) with the new station to the south being named Charing Cross (Embankment). (Note: The two parts of the interchange station between the MDR and the BS&WR had previously used different names: Charing Cross (MDR) and Embankment (BS&WR).) On 9 May 1915, these were changed again with the former Charing Cross station becoming Strand (causing a nearby station of the GNP&BR to change its name from Strand to Aldwych) and the other becoming Charing Cross.

Beginning in 1924, a number of central London stations were modernised with escalators being provided to replace lifts. At Trafalgar Square, two Otis escalators came into use on 13 April 1926, doubling the capacity of the station. The ticket hall was modernised and extended to use the space previously occupied by the lifts and a passage was constructed to a new entrance in Cockspur Street on the south side of the square. The improvements to the ticket hall included the installation of automatic ticket machines. Strand station retained its lifts. (Note: Although they received modifications for automatic operation in 1935, the original lifts were still operational in 1973 when Strand station was closed for reconstruction.)

=== War and new plans ===
In September 1938 during the Sudeten Crisis, when it appeared that war with Germany was imminent, the tunnels of the Bakerloo and Northern lines under the River Thames were closed and sealed with concrete to protect the system from flooding that might be caused by a bomb falling in the river and breaching the tunnels. As a consequence, between 27 September 1938 and 8 October 1938 both Trafalgar Square and Strand stations were closed. After the crisis was resolved and the concrete seals were removed, works began on installing flood gates to protect the lines each side of the river. Following Germany's ultimatum to Poland on the Polish Corridor, the Northern line tunnels were again plugged on 1 September 1939 and were not reopened until 17 December 1939, once the flood gates had been installed. (Note: While the tunnels under the river were plugged, the Bakerloo line was closed between Piccadilly Circus and Elephant & Castle and the Northern line between Strand and Kennington. Crossovers at Strand and Piccadilly Circus allowed trains to be reversed.)

On 12 October 1940, a German bomb fell on Trafalgar Square station killing seven people sheltering from the Blitz.

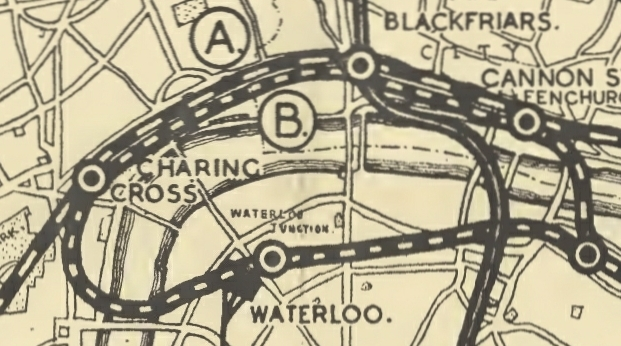
The 1944 County of London Plan proposals for underground routes through Charing Cross (full map)

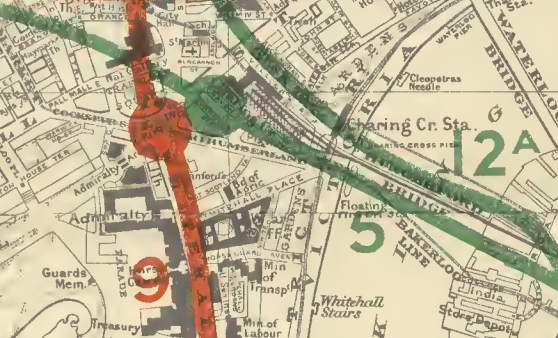
The 1946 Report proposals for underground routes through Charing Cross (full map)

In 1944, The County of London Plan recommended replacing the mainline station with one below ground served by two routes: Route A, running between Clapham and New Cross via Victoria station, Blackfriars, Cannon Street and Wapping and Route B, a loop line linking Waterloo, Charing Cross, Blackfriars, Cannon Street and London Bridge. The location of the station was not specified.

A post-war report in 1946 rejected the idea of moving the mainline station entirely underground, but did propose several new lines running in tunnels within the central area including two serving Charing Cross. (Note: The report, Report to the Minister of War Transport, 21 January 1946 by the Railway (London Plan) Committee 1944, considered twelve routes for improving mainline and London Underground services in the capital.) Route 5 (running between Hither Green and Old Oak Common) and Route 9 (running between Raynes Park and Clapton) were mainline routes proposed to connect to existing surface lines to allow main line trains to cross London without using the terminals. A third route, Route 12A, was a London Underground route running between Golders Green and Waterloo. It was to run beneath the existing Northern line tunnels to relieve congestion on the line. (Note: A duplication of parts of the Northern line's tunnels had first been considered in 1935 when new tunnels were proposed between Camden Town and Waterloo and between Balham and Kennington for express services that would bypass a number of stations. Strand station was one of those that would have been bypassed. During the war, deep-level shelters were constructed beneath a number of Northern line stations so that they could be converted for use as part of the duplicate tunnels after the war.)

None of these proposals were developed by the mainline railway companies, the London Passenger Transport Board or their successor organisations. (Note: Of the twelve routes in the 1946 report, only Route 8, "A South to North Link – East Croydon to Finsbury Park" was developed further, eventually becoming the Victoria line.)

In 1956, the London County Council planned to construct pedestrian subways from the ticket hall of Strand station under Strand to Duncannon Street and Adelaide Street with a travelator in the main passage from the station and escalators from the subways to street level. A separate subway from the north side of Strand to the ticket hall and another to connect to the subways from Trafalgar Square station were also proposed. The works were not carried-out.

=== Reconstruction and integration for the Jubilee line ===
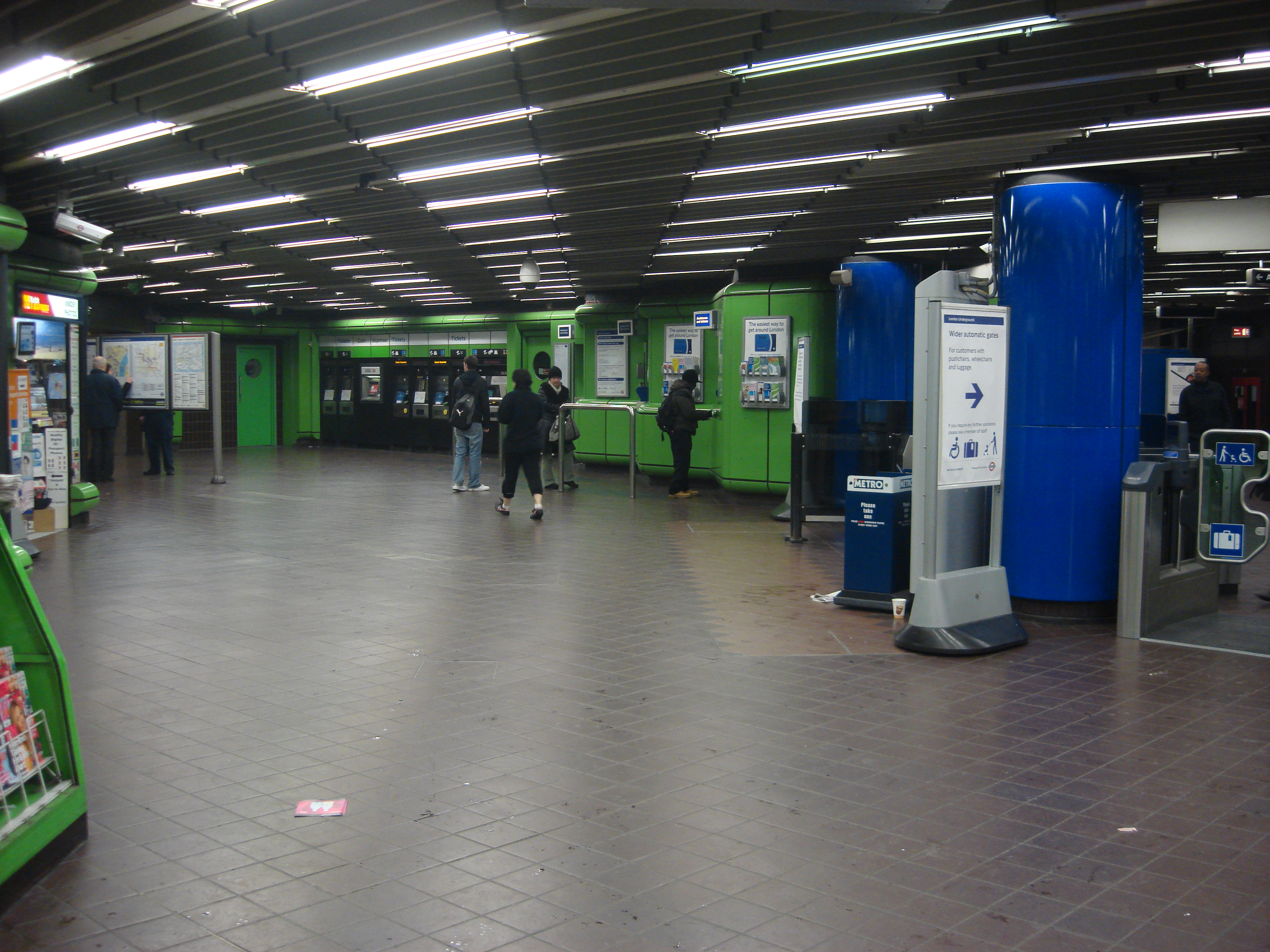
Northern line and Jubilee line ticket hall in its 1979 colour scheme

Throughout the 1950s and early 1960s consideration was given to various routes connecting north-west and south-east London via the West End and the City of London including proposals to extend the Bakerloo line south-east from Elephant & Castle to Camberwell and beyond. Planning of the Victoria line had the greater priority and it was not until after construction of that line started that detailed planning began for the new line, first called the Fleet line in 1965 as it was planned to run in an east–west direction along Fleet Street to the City of London and then south of the River Thames to Lewisham. Lack of funding meant that only the first stage of the proposed line, from Baker Street to Charing Cross, received royal assent in July 1969; funding was agreed in August 1971. (Note: Funding for Stage 1 of the line was to come from the Greater London Council and central government in the ratio 1:3.)

Tunnelling began in February 1972 and was completed by the end of 1974. In 1977, during construction of the stations, the name of the line was changed to the Jubilee line, to mark the Queen's Silver Jubilee that year. (Note: The decision to change the name of the line was made by the Greater London Council, although the line was not expected to open until 1978 and did not open until 1979.)

At Charing Cross, the tunnels for the Jubilee line were aligned east–west beneath Strand with the running tunnels passing under the Bakerloo line and Northern line tunnels and the new Jubilee line platforms between the two. A cross-over junction to the west of the platforms enabled trains to terminate and start from both platforms. In preparation for the second stage of the line continuing to Aldwych and beyond, the running tunnels were continued east of the new platforms at Charing Cross, running beneath Strand to end at Wellington Street. The original Strand station ticket hall beneath the forecourt of the mainline station was enlarged under the forecourt and under Strand itself. To enable this, piles were installed in the forecourt in January 1973 to support a steel umbrella structure erected over the area during the Easter weekend in 1973. The foundations of the Eleanor cross in the station forecourt also needed to be underpinned to avoid it being damaged during the excavations. With the enlargement of the ticket hall, linking subways were constructed to new entrances in Villiers Street, on the north side of Strand, in Adelaide Street and in William IV Street.

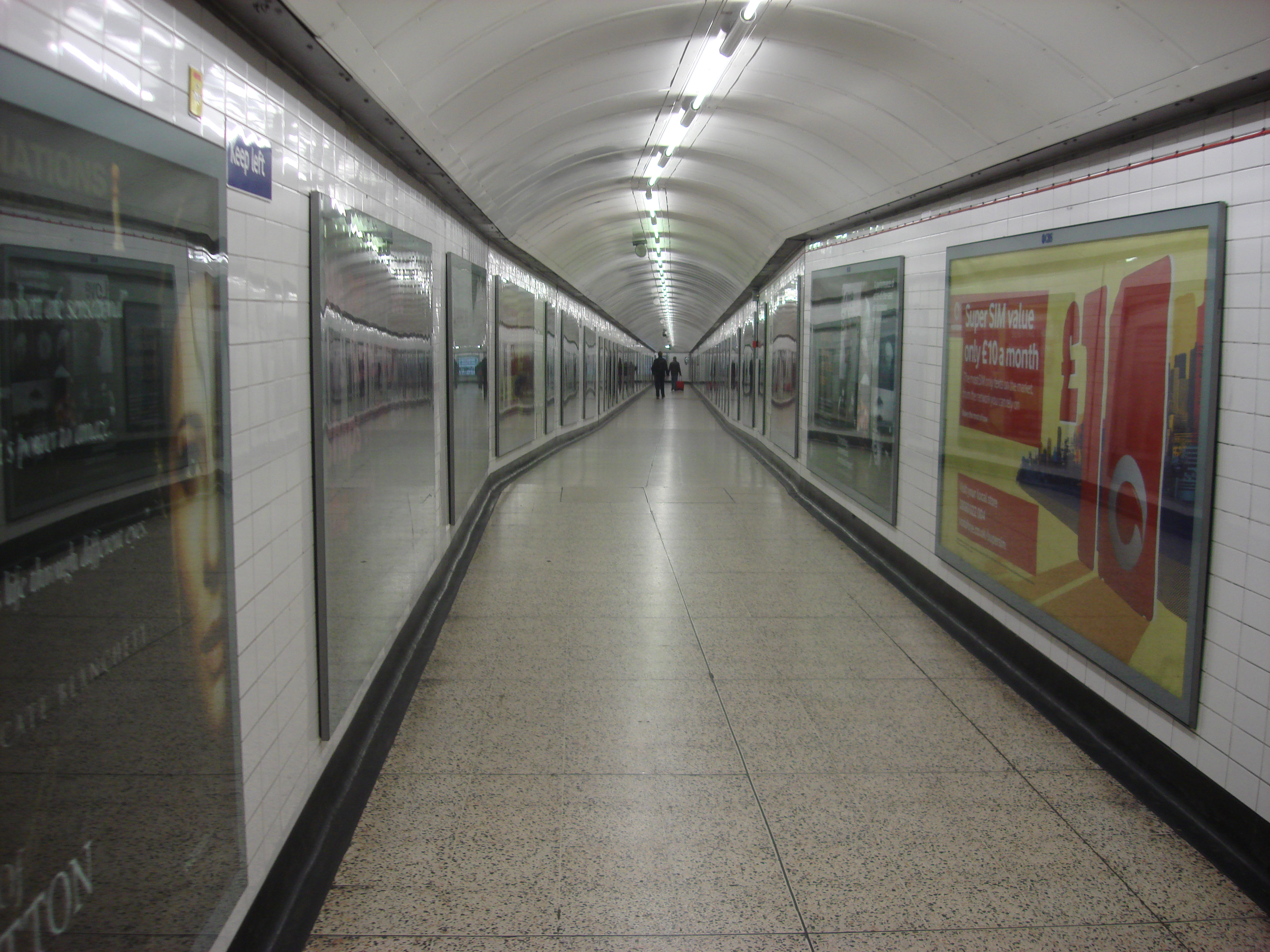
The passage connecting the Bakerloo and Northern line platforms

The new platforms were connected to both of the original stations, forming one new station. Strand station closed on 16 June 1973 so that an escalator shaft could be constructed diagonally through the original lift shafts down to an intermediate concourse. From here passages to and from the Northern line platforms branch off and a second set of three escalators descend to the eastern end of the Jubilee line platforms, which are 26.2 metres (86 ft) below street level. At Trafalgar Square station, the existing concourse at the bottom of the 1926 escalator shaft was enlarged to connect to a new passage which ran eastwards towards another concourse at the top of a second set of two escalators and a fixed stair down to the western end of the Jubilee line platforms. To carry out the work on the station and the running tunnels, a site on the north-western corner of Trafalgar Square at Whitcomb Street was used to construct a pair of access shafts 120 feet (37 m) deep from which long passages were excavated beneath Trafalgar Square to the existing below ground concourses. (Note: The site of the access shaft is now occupied by the Sainsbury Wing of the National Gallery.) Although not originally intended for passenger use, part of one of these became the interchange passage between the Bakerloo and Northern lines. A new electrical sub-station to supply the line was installed at the bottom of one of Strand station's redundant escalator shafts. Once the structural work to enlarge the ticket hall was completed, the umbrella structure was removed in October 1975.

Work on fitting out the tunnels and stations began at the end of 1975, but serious delays in the progress of the work prevented the line from opening in 1978 as intended. Tracks and signals were commissioned and trial running of trains on the line began on 14 August 1978, but work on the station was delayed by industrial action at the escalator contractor.

The official opening of the line by Prince Charles took place on 30 April 1979, starting with a train journey from Green Park to Charing Cross. The Jubilee line opened to the public on 1 May 1979. On the same day the Northern line service was reinstated and the combined station was named Charing Cross.

The new Northern line and Jubilee line ticket hall was decorated in lime green and blue moulded plastic panels with black tiles. Lime green was also used for the wall tiling of the Jubilee line platforms which was combined with decorative panels featuring images of Lord Nelson and Trafalgar Square by David Gentleman. Gentleman also designed the decorative scheme for the Northern line platforms. These have panels featuring a continuous mural illustrating, in the style of black and white woodcuts, the construction of the Eleanor Cross. The Bakerloo line platforms and ticket hall were not redecorated at the same time as those of the other two lines. This was carried out in 1983 when decorative panels for the platforms featuring artwork from the National Gallery and National Portrait Gallery were installed.

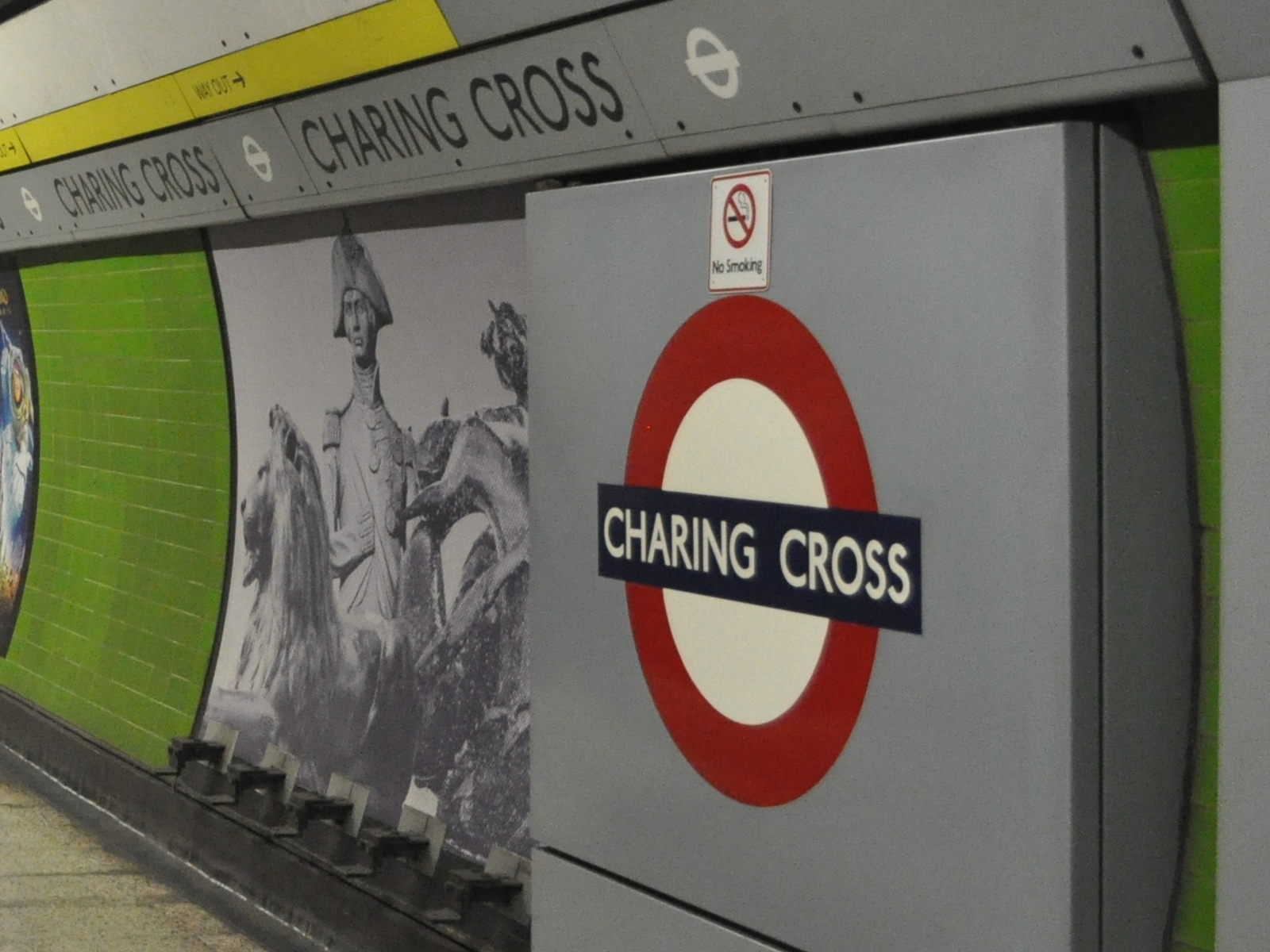
Jubilee line platform for train use only

Northern line platform

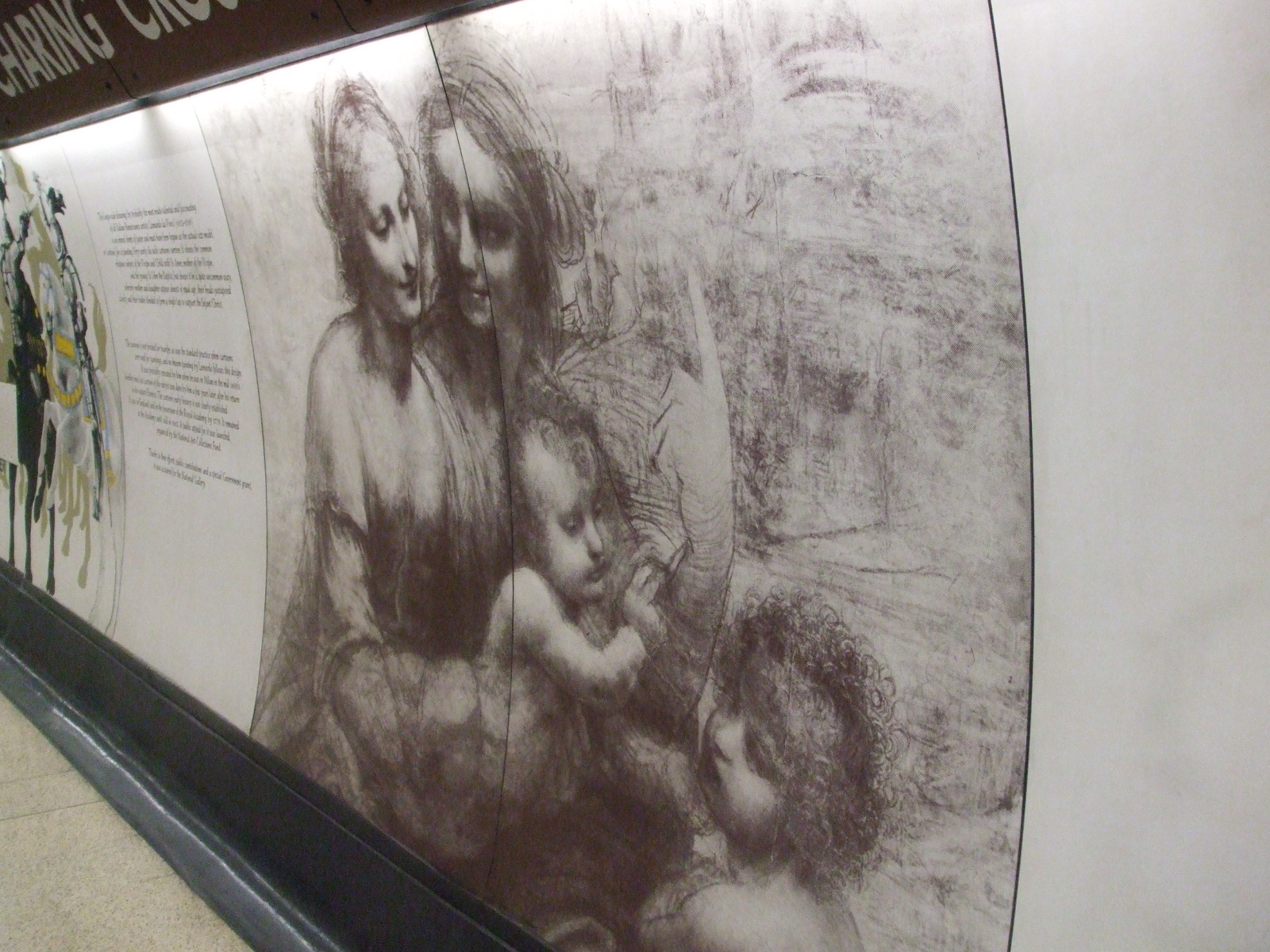
Bakerloo line platform

=== Closure of Jubilee line platforms ===
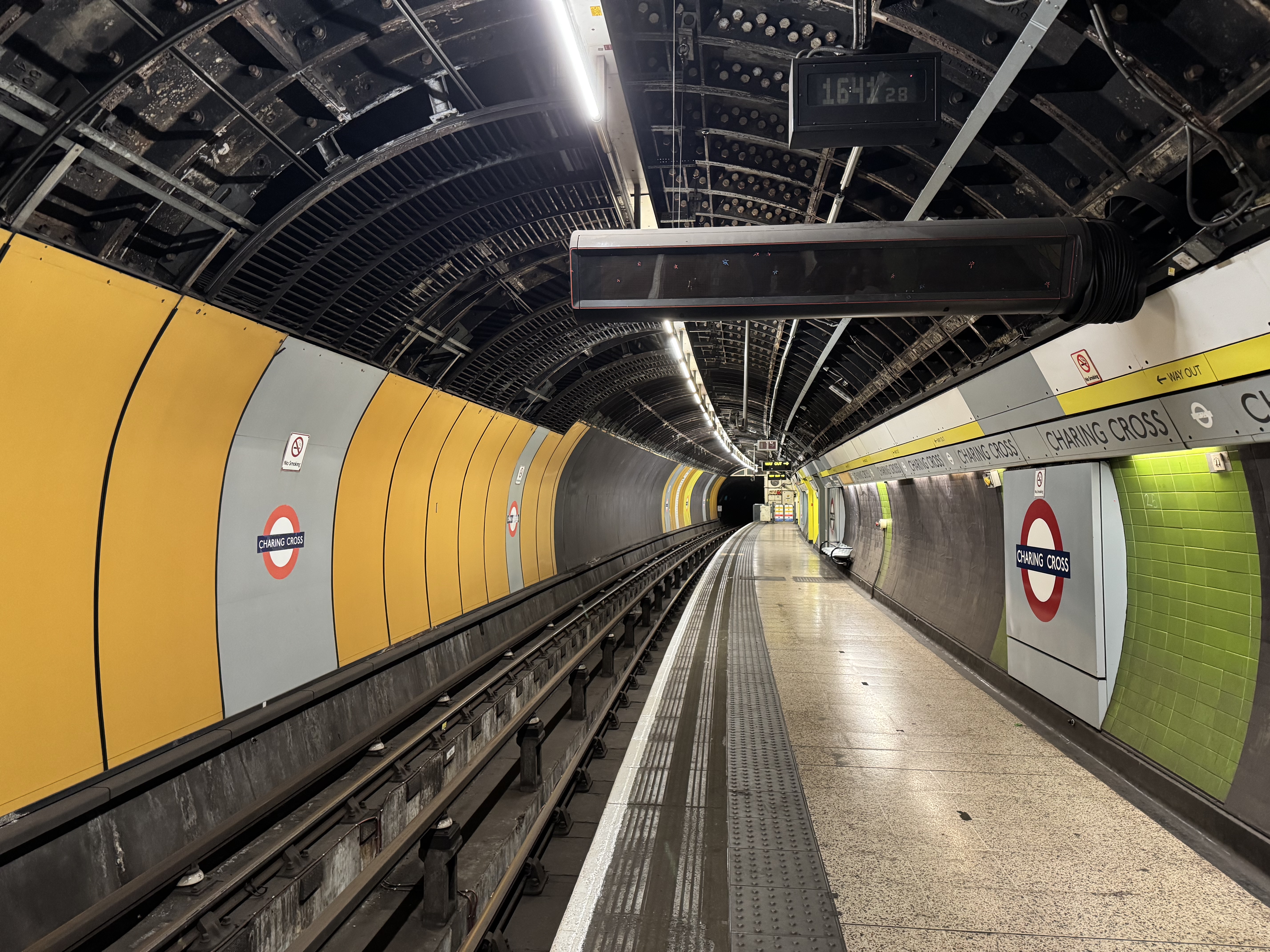
The disused Jubilee line platform 3 at Charing Cross, seen in 2025

Although permission had been granted in 1971 and 1972, work on the Fleet line's stages 2 and 3 did not proceed and it was not until 1992 that an alternative route was approved. (Note: Although London Transport obtained permission for Stage 2 (Charing Cross to Fenchurch Street via Ludgate Circus and Cannon Street) in 1971 and Stage 3 (Fenchurch Street to Lewisham via New Cross) in 1972, uncertainty as to the appropriate eastern destination of the line and shortage of funds meant that the works were never begun. A variety of alternative routes were considered during the 1970s and 1980s until a final route taking the line to Stratford was approved in 1992.) The Jubilee line extension took the line south and east of the River Thames via Waterloo and Canary Wharf. Due to the tightness of the curves required and speed restrictions that would have been needed it was impractical to reach Waterloo from Charing Cross. (Note: A route from Charing Cross to Waterloo would have had to travel through a 180-degree curve to approach Waterloo from the north. A new route starting from Green Park, could have served either Embankment, St James's Park or Westminster. The latter was on the most direct route and was the one chosen.) New tunnels branching from the original route south of Green Park would be constructed, and the line to Charing Cross would be closed. Tunnelling began in May 1994 and the new extension opened in stages starting at Stratford in the east, with services to Charing Cross ending on 19 November 1999 and the final section between Green Park and Waterloo opening the following day. The Jubilee line platforms were closed and walls constructed across the intermediate concourses at the top of the two banks of escalators.

The Jubilee line platforms are still used by Jubilee line trains as sidings to reverse trains from southbound to northbound. To do so, southbound trains terminate and disembark passengers at Green Park station and run empty to one of the Charing Cross platforms. London Transport Museum runs guided tours of the disused platforms, corridors, and concourse as part of its Hidden London programme, which takes the public to closed-off parts of the Underground network. These unused sections were used in early-mid 2026 by the ARRC to conduct war games focused around Russian attacks.

=== Proposal for connection to Docklands Light Railway ===
In July 2005, a report, DLR Horizon 2020 Study, for the Docklands Light Railway (DLR) examined "pragmatic development schemes" to expand and improve the DLR network between 2012 and 2020. One of the proposals was an extension of the DLR from Bank to Charing Cross. The unused tunnels under Strand would be enlarged to accommodate the larger DLR trains. In 2011, the DLR published a proposal to continue the extension to Victoria via Green Park. No further work has been done on these proposals.

=== Ticket hall refurbishment and closure of subways ===
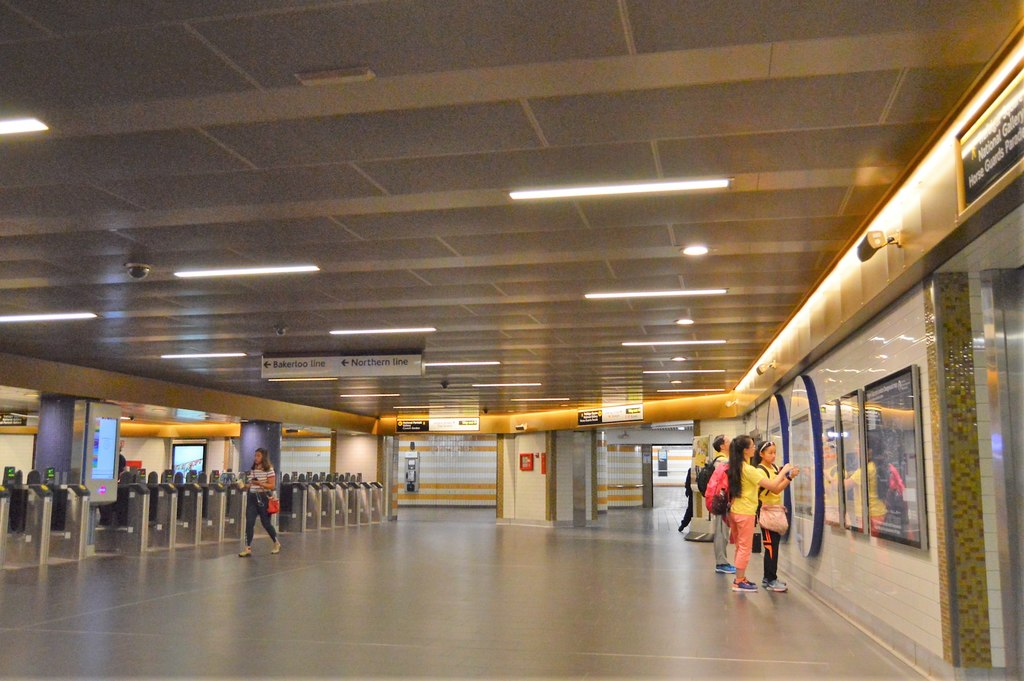
Northern line ticket hall after refurbishment

In 2016 and 2017, the two ticket halls were separately closed for refurbishment. In each one, interior finishes and lighting were replaced and new ticket barriers were installed. The Northern line ticket hall closed in September 2016 and was scheduled to reopen in July 2017, but reopened a month earlier. Following its reopening, Northern line Night Tube services began stopping at the station on 30 June 2017. They had been introduced on the line in November 2016, but did not serve Charing Cross until the Northern line ticket hall reopened.

In June 2020 a planning approval was granted to close the subways to Adelaide Street, William IV Street and the north side of Strand and convert the space to office and retail use linked to the building above.

== Use in media ==
As the Jubilee line platforms at Charing Cross are fully maintained by TfL for operational purposes, they are frequently used as a filming location for productions requiring a modern Underground station.

Films, television productions and music videos that have been shot at Charing Cross include:

- The Fourth Protocol (1987)
- Creep (2004)
- "Cry" (2004), Alex Parks (music video)
- 28 Weeks Later (2007)
- The Bourne Ultimatum (2007)
- The Escapist (2008)
- Spooks (2009)
- Skyfall (2012)
- Thor: The Dark World (2013)
- Paddington (2014)
- The Rook (2019)
- Killing Eve (2019)

== Services and connections ==
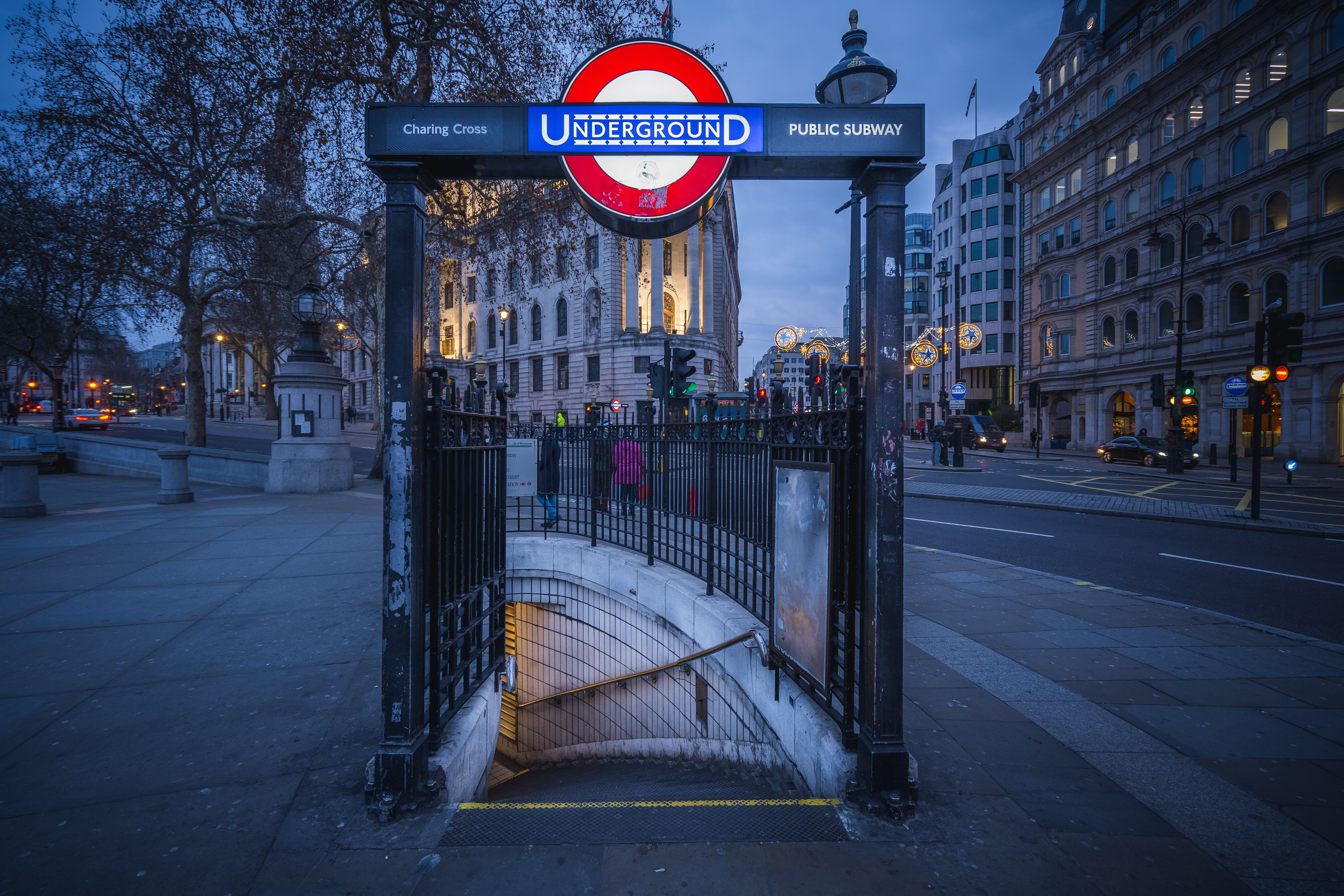
Pedestrian subway entrance from the corner of Trafalgar Square to the Bakerloo line ticket hall at the station

=== Services ===
==== Bakerloo line ====
On the Bakerloo line, Charing Cross station is between Piccadilly Circus to the north and Embankment to the south. The typical off-peak service on the Bakerloo line in trains per hour (tph) is as follows:

- 16 tph Southbound to Elephant & Castle
- 8 tph Northbound to Queen's Park
- 4 tph Northbound to Stonebridge Park
- 4 tph Northbound to Harrow & Wealdstone

==== Northern line ====
On its branch of the Northern line, Charing Cross station is between Leicester Square to the north and Embankment to the south. The typical off-peak service on the Northern line in trains per hour (tph) is as follows:

- 20 tph Southbound to Kennington, of which 10 continue to Battersea
- 10 tph Northbound to Edgware
- 8 tph Northbound to High Barnet
- 2 tph Northbound to Mill Hill East

There is also a crossover to the north of the station to allow trains to terminate and turn around.

Furthermore, on Friday and Saturday nights, Night Tube services operate on the Northern line through this station. The typical Night Tube service on the Northern line in trains per hour is as follows:

- 8 tph Southbound to Morden
- 4 tph Northbound to High Barnet
- 4 tph Northbound to Edgware

Preceding station	London Underground	Following station
Piccadilly Circus towards Harrow & Wealdstone	Bakerloo line	Embankment towards Elephant & Castle
Leicester Square towards Edgware, Mill Hill East or High Barnet	Northern line Charing Cross branch	Embankment towards Battersea Power Station, Morden or Kennington
Former services
Green Park towards Stanmore	Jubilee line	Terminus
Abandoned plans
Green Park towards Stanmore	Jubilee line Phase 2 (never constructed)	Aldwych towards New Cross Gate or Lewisham

=== Connections ===
Multiple day and nighttime London Buses routes serve Trafalgar Square and Charing Cross station.

== Notes and references ==
=== Bibliography ===
- Badsey-Ellis, Antony (2005). London's Lost Tube Schemes. Capital Transport. ISBN 978-1-85414-293-1.
- Badsey-Ellis, Antony (2016). Building London's Underground: From Cut-and Cover to Crossrail. Capital Transport. ISBN 978-1-8541-4397-6.
- Bownes, David; Green, Oliver; Mullins, Sam (2012). Underground: How the Tube Shaped London. London Transport Museum/Allen Lane. ISBN 978-1-846-14462-2.
- Bruce, J Graeme; Croome, Desmond F (2006) [1996]. The Central Line (2nd ed.). Capital Transport. ISBN 978-1-85414-297-9.
- Connor, J. E. (2006) [1999]. London's Disused Underground Stations (2nd (revised) ed.). Capital Transport. ISBN 978-1-85414-250-4.
- Day, John R; Reed, John (2010) [1963]. The Story of London's Underground (11th ed.). Capital Transport. ISBN 978-1-85414-341-9.
- Emmerson, Andrew; Beard, Tony (2004). London's Secret Tubes. Capital Transport. ISBN 978-1-85414-283-2.
- Harris, Cyril M (2006) [1977]. What's in a name? (4th (updated) ed.). Published by Capital Transport, in co-operation with London Transport Museum. ISBN 978-1-85414-241-2.
- Horne, Mike (2001). The Bakerloo Line: An Illustrated History. Capital Transport. ISBN 978-1-85414-248-1.
- Horne, Mike (2000). The Jubilee Line: An Illustrated History. Capital Transport. ISBN 978-1-85414-220-7.
- Horne, Mike (2009) [1990]. The Northern Line: An Illustrated History (3rd ed.). Capital Transport. ISBN 978-1-85414-326-6.
- Inglis, Charles (21 January 1946). Report to the Minister of War Transport. Ministry of War Transport/His Majesty's Stationery Office.
- Long, David (2014). The Little Book of the London Underground. The History Press. ISBN 978-0-7524-6236-3.
- Rose, Douglas (2016) [1980]. The London Underground, A Diagrammatic History (9th ed.). Douglas Rose/Capital Transport. ISBN 978-1-85414-404-1.
- Wolmar, Christian (2005) [2004]. The Subterranean Railway: How the London Underground Was Built and How It Changed the City Forever. Atlantic Books. ISBN 978-1-84354-023-6.
