= Hackney Downs =

Coordinates: 51.550818°N 0.061820°W

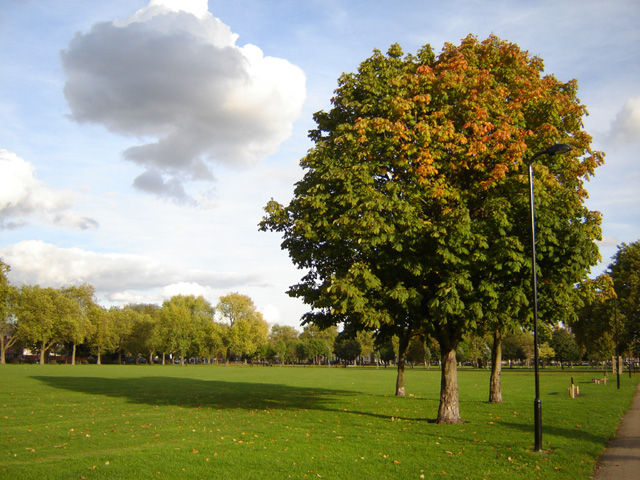
- Hackney Downs from the centre of the Downs looking northeast (October 2005)

- Location within Greater London
- London borough: Hackney
- Ceremonial county: Greater London
- Region: London
- Country: England
- Sovereign state: United Kingdom
- Post town: LONDON
- Dialling code: 020
- Police: Metropolitan
- Fire: London
- Ambulance: London
- London Assembly: North East

Hackney Downs is a park and an area of historically common land in the Lower Clapton area of the London Borough of Hackney. The name is sometimes also used to apply to the neighbourhood around the park.

== Hackney Downs Park ==
The Downs open space was originally common land, preserved from the 1860s as parkland as a result of pressure by the Commons Preservation Society. At 16 hectares (40 acres), the park is one of the larger open spaces wholly within the London Borough of Hackney. It has a play area, basketball courts, football pitches and a bowling green.

Occupying, as it does, a fairly central place in Hackney, the park used to be the yearly venue for the popular Hackney Show, but this event — which helped to give a sense of community and identity to an often-troubled borough — has been discontinued in recent times as a cost-cutting measure, as have the regular Fireworks Night shows. The park was given a Green Flag award in July 2008.

In 1938 as part of Hackney Borough's provision of public bomb shelters Trenches were dug in Hackney Downs, along with the Eggerton Road recreation ground and Millfields Park.

== Neighbourhood ==
A map showing the Downs ward of Hackney Metropolitan Borough as it appeared in 1916.

The ‘Hackney Downs’ neighbourhood can be described as the western part of Lower Clapton; the area to the west of Cricketfield Road and east of the railway line. The streets north and south of the park are dominated by social housing (such as the Nightingale Estate) – these areas were largely rebuilt during the 1930s and 1960s.

== Education ==
Hackney Downs School was also located here. The site has been redeveloped as the Mossbourne Community Academy.

== Governance ==
Hackney Downs is currently a ward name, the represented area of three councillors, of Hackney Council up for election every 4 years.

Hackney Downs 2022(3)
Party	Candidate	Votes	%	±%
Labour	Michael Desmond*	1,823		
Labour	Sem Moema*	1,748		
Green	Alastair Binnie-Lubbock	1,667		
Labour	Anna-Joy Rickard*	1,636		
Green	Bettina Maidment	1,573		
Green	Charlie Norman	1,316		
Conservative	Agnieszka Cuellar-Bridy	194		
Liberal Democrats	Erika Merguigi		5.2	
Conservative	Joanna Wojciechowska	161		
Conservative	Nikodem Mikolajewski	155		
Ind. Network	Ruth Parkinson	101		
TUSC	Clare Doyle	99		
Turnout			40.0	
Labour hold		Swing		
Labour hold		Swing		
Green gain from Labour		Swing		

Hackney Downs 2018 (3)
Party	Candidate	Votes	%	±%
Labour	Michael Desmond*	2,076		
Labour	Anna-Joy Rickard*	1,852		
Labour	Sem Moema	1,687		
Green	Alastair Binnie-Lubbock	1,597		
Green	Sheila Menon	1,134		
Green	Sally Zlotowitz	1,074		
Conservative	Mohammed Lunat	229		
Conservative	Yasmin Lunat	214		
Conservative	Agnieszka Rolkiewicz	122		
Majority				
Turnout			39.7	
Labour hold		Swing		
Labour hold		Swing		
Labour hold		Swing		

== Transport and locale ==
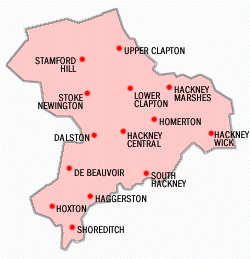
Districts within the London Borough of Hackney.

The two London Overground stations are Hackney Central on the North London line and Hackney Downs on the Lea Valley Lines to Liverpool Street.
