= Nightingale Estate =

Housing estate in Lower Clapton, London

Coordinates: 51.557°N 0.060°W

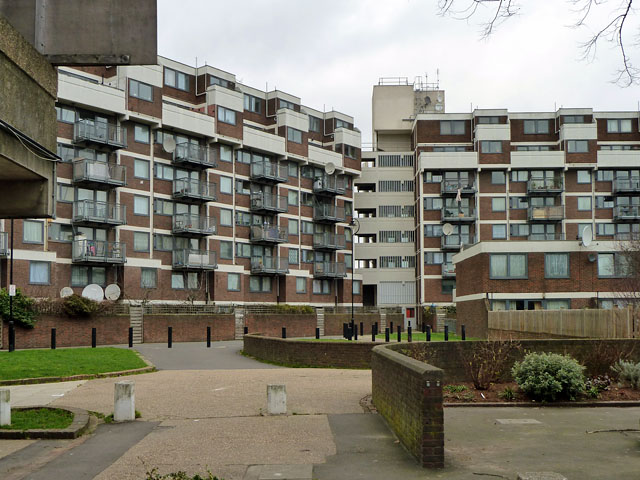
- Interactive map of Nightingale Estate

General information
- Location: Lower Clapton
- Area: East London
- No. of blocks: 1

Construction
- Constructed: 1968
- Authority: Greater London Council
- Style: Modernist

Refurbishment
- Refurbished: 2003-6

Other information
- Governing body: Hackney Council
- Famous residents: Ashley Wales

The Nightingale Estate is located in the Lower Clapton area of the London Borough of Hackney, next to Hackney Downs. The estate originally consisted of six 22 story tower blocks, but was redeveloped between 2003-2006 and replaced with mostly low-rise buildings. Only one of the towers, Seaton Point, still remains.

== History ==
The original six 65-metre (213 ft), 22 story Nightingale Estate blocks were approved and built in 1968 by the then Greater London Council. These were (from west to east):

- Rachel Point
- Rathbone Point
- Seaton Point, distinguishable by its chimney
- Farnell Point
- Embley Point
- Southerland Point

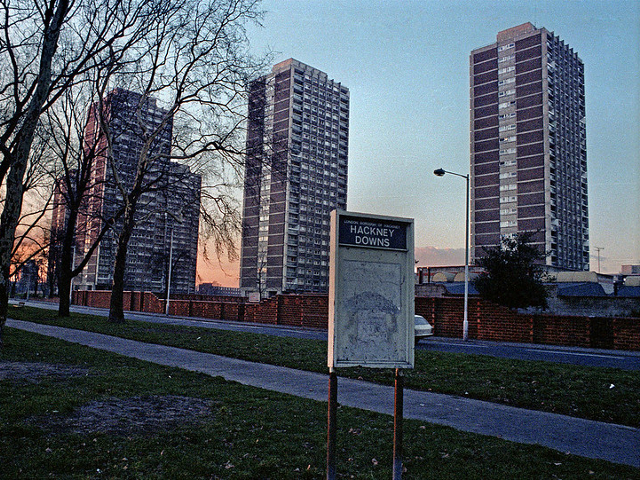
The Nightingale Estate in 1980

In the late 1980s/early 1990s, the flats fell into disrepair. Rising problems of crime and anti-social behaviour on the estate led to some residents taking action. As part of a then UK Government regeneration scheme, Hackney Council drew up plans to redevelop the estate which led to five of the blocks (with the exception of Seaton Point), being demolished.

Farnell Point was the first to be felled by implosion on 26 July 1998, followed by Embley Point and Southerland Point on 3 December 2000. Finally, Rathbone Point and Rachel Point were demolished on 30 November 2003.

Between 2003 and 2006, a redevelopment saw low-rise housing built to replace the demolished towers.

In 2017, Hackney Council announced a £200 million plan to construct 400 homes on the site, in addition to 300 built earlier.

== In popular culture ==
Embley Point was home to London pirate radio stations in the early 1990s including Kool FM. One such station Rush FM, was subject to a high-profile raid in July 1993 resulting in media coverage about alleged drug and rave party links to stations operating from the estate.

The estate is represented on the artwork for the first three singles released 1994 by electronic music act Spring Heel Jack - member Ashley Wales lived at Rachel Point. It has also featured in the music videos of bands Travis, Suede, and Blur.

Seaton Point is the setting for the 1998 novel of the same name, edited by Robert Dellar and contributed to by him amongst other authors.

The BBC television show Top Gear used the estate demolition as part of a stunt for the 'indestructible' Toyota Hilux, which was hoisted onto the roof of Rachel Point. The car still worked after the demolition and was placed on the wall of the Top Gear studios.
