= Piccadilly, City and North East London Railway =

The Piccadilly, City and North East London Railway (PC&NELR) was a tube railway (Note: A "tube" railway is an underground railway constructed in a cylindrical tunnel by the use of a tunnelling shield, usually deep below ground level.) in London proposed in 1902. The railway was to run from Southgate to Hammersmith and Shepherd's Bush via Palmers Green, Tottenham, Stoke Newington, Dalston, Shoreditch, the City of London, the West End and Kensington.

The PC&NELR was formed from the combination of three earlier railway schemes proposed in 1901; the Piccadilly and City Railway and the North East London Railway and part of the London United Electric Railway (LUER). The railway was supported by American financier J. P. Morgan and London United Tramways (LUT), whose network of tram routes in west London would provide passengers for the railway at Hammersmith.

Although looked on favourably in Parliament, consideration of the PC&NELR's bills was delayed while they and a number of other tube railway bills were evaluated. During the delay, Morgan's representatives fell out with the LUT over the division of the ownership of the group, and, in September 1902, Sir George White, chairman of the LUT, sold the company to Speyer Brothers, a finance house led by Edgar Speyer. Speyer Brothers was one of the backers of the rival underground railway schemes being developed by Charles Yerkes' Underground Electric Railways Company of London (UERL). In a message to his London representative, Sir Clinton Dawkins, Morgan described the transaction as "the greatest rascality and conspiracy I ever heard of."

With the LUT and the LUER portions of the PC&NELR route under its control, Speyer Brothers withdrew the bill to construct the western LUER portion of the PC&NELR route, which duplicated part of the route of the UERL's Brompton and Piccadilly Circus Railway. The withdrawn section of the route was critical to the construction of the PC&NELR as a whole, and Morgan's representatives attempted to get permission from Parliament to proceed with the remaining part of the line, but this was denied and the PC&NELR's bills were withdrawn.

The PC&NELR scheme was not revived, although the UERL, which took control of the LUT, did use the tram network to feed passengers into its own Great Northern, Piccadilly and Brompton Railway at Hammersmith when that opened in December 1906.

== Notes and references ==
=== Bibliography ===
- Badsey-Ellis, Antony (2005). London's Lost Tube Schemes. Capital Transport. ISBN 1-85414-293-3.
- Franch, John (2006). Robber Baron: The Life of Charles Tyson Yerkes. Urbana: University of Illinois Press. ISBN 0-252-03099-0.
