= We Are the Pigs =

1994 single by Suede

Single by Suede

from the album Dog Man Star
- B-side: "Killing of a Flash Boy"; "Whipsnade"
- Released: 12 September 1994
- Studio: Master Rock (London, England)
- Genre: Britpop; glam rock; indie rock; alternative rock
- Length: 4:19; 3:56 (single edit)
- Label: Nude
- Songwriters: Brett Anderson, Bernard Butler
- Producer: Ed Buller

Suede singles chronology
"Stay Together" (1994)	"We Are the Pigs" (1994)	"The Wild Ones" (1994)

"We Are the Pigs" is the first single from the album Dog Man Star by British band Suede, released on 12 September 1994 through Nude Records.

== Background ==
The single heralded the darker tone that the band had taken for Dog Man Star, which contrasted heavily with their debut album. The unsettling sound on the single was not characteristic of the popular Britpop bands of the time. The departure of guitarist Bernard Butler, ahead of its release, overshadowed the single somewhat. That event, along with the song's music video receiving little airplay, contributed to its relatively poor charting, peaking at No. 18 on the UK Singles Chart and No. 34 in Sweden.

Singer and co-writer Brett Anderson has said he wrote it while he was living in Highgate. It is a song about revolution and the juxtaposition between the middle class lives of Highgate and the council estates of the not too far away Archway. He said: "[It's] a warning to the middle classes that everyone they're keeping under their feet is going to end up crushing their skulls. That was the idea behind it. It's supposed to be quite a violent thing."

The cover art for the single features a still from the cult film Freak Orlando.

== Reception and legacy ==
The single was very well received in the British press. David Sinclair of The Times wrote: "Propelled by one of Bernard Butler's finest riff chord sequences and fuelled by the nightmare visions of Brett Anderson's lyric, the song romps home with a glorious chorus that combines old-fashioned sing-a-long appeal with an intriguingly sinister edge." Caroline Sullivan's review in The Guardian was printed the day before the band announced Oakes as their new guitarist. In it she predicted it would be the band's swansong. However, she was very favourable saying: "It's a typically melodramatic affair, Butler's squawking playing counterpointed by Brett Anderson's breastbeating emoting. One of their best." Martin Aston of Music Week wrote: "After the recent departure of guitarist Bernard Butler, Suede have to be at their best. 'We Are the Pigs' is just the ticket, one of their very best, strident, anthemic singles, which neatly sets the tone for the equally stunning second album on October 10."

Pitchfork placed "We Are the Pigs" at No. 169 on their list of the Top 200 Tracks of the 1990s. In 2006, Total Guitar ranked Butler's solo at No. 57 in its list of the "100 Hottest Solos". The B-side "Killing of a Flash Boy" became a staple of Suede's live set list and was included on the B-sides album Sci-Fi Lullabies. In 2014, NME ranked the song at No. 364 on its list of the 500 greatest songs of all time.

== Music video ==
The video for "We Are the Pigs", directed by David and Raphael Vital-Durand, features a grim, Nineteen Eighty-Four–like setting. It was initially banned by some TV stations including MTV for being too violent. The video features burning cars, cross burnings, and masked gangs roaming the streets, committing violent acts. Also notable is the video features the first official public appearance of new guitarist Richard Oakes. The video for the B-side, "Killing of a Flash Boy", a specially commissioned backdrop film for the Dog Man Star tour, produced by Derek Jarman was shot in Nightingale Estate in Hackney.

== Track listings ==
All songs were written by Brett Anderson and Bernard Butler.

- 7-inch and cassette single
1. "We Are the Pigs"
2. "Killing of a Flash Boy"
- 12-inch and CD single
1. "We Are the Pigs"
2. "Killing of a Flash Boy"
3. "Whipsnade"

== Charts ==
Chart (1994)	Peak position
Europe (Eurochart Hot 100)	70
Israel (IBA)	19
Scottish Singles Sales (Official Charts)	20
Sweden (Sverigetopplistan)	34
UK Singles (Official Charts)	18
UK Airplay (Music Week)	23

== Release history ==
Region	Date	Format(s)	Label(s)	Ref.
United Kingdom	12 September 1994	7-inch vinyl; 12-inch vinyl; CD; cassette	Nude	
Japan	24 November 1994	CD	Nude	
