= Kelly Erez =

English singer-songwriter

- Born: London, England
- Genres: R&B, soul
- Occupation: Singer-songwriter
- Years active: 2010–present
- Labels: Definition Music
- Website: kellyerez.com

Kelly Erez is an English R&B and soul singer-songwriter and vocal coach.

== Biography ==
Kelly was born and grew up in Stratford, East London. She has been interested in music since an early age and her biggest influence was the 90s R&B, particularly such artists as Mariah Carey and Boyz II Men. Erez studied Marketing and Advertising at the London College of Communication.

She began sharing her music on YouTube in 2010 and went on to release an EP This Is Me... in early 2011, which she sponsored by raising funds on PledgeMusic. The EP was promoted by the song "Letters" which was popular on YouTube and received media coverage in Poland. Still in 2011, Kelly played her first live concerts, including a show at Hoxton Hall. October 2012 saw the release of her debut studio album, Come to Me, produced by her sister Natalie Erez. The title song was picked by BBC Radio 1Xtra as Track of the Week and received airplay across the BBC network. The music video for the song followed in January 2013. In May 2013, Erez released a double A-side single with songs "Xtra" and "Money Money" which was well received on urban radio in the UK. In 2015, Kelly contributed vocals to the song "Distraction" by Cardboard Foxes.

Her second EP, Clear My Name, was self-released in September 2018, promoted by the title song. In May 2021, Erez appeared on the BBC game show I Can See Your Voice. Around the same time, she also released a remix EP, promoted by a new single and music video "Run the Water". Her single, "Time Out", was released in January 2022 and her latest single 'Migrating Fears', whose music and lyrics were written by Solon Solomon, was released in 2024 as the opening song in Solomon's 'Migrating Fears' film.

== Discography ==
=== Studio albums ===
Title	Album details
Come to Me	Released: 22 October 2012; Label: Definition Music; Formats: CD, digital download, streaming

=== EPs ===
Title	Album details
This Is Me...	Released: 14 February 2011; Label: Definition Music; Formats: digital download, streaming
Clear My Name	Released: 28 September 2018; Label: self-released; Formats: digital download, streaming
Clear My Name (Remix EP)	Released: 28 May 2021; Label: self-released; Formats: digital download, streaming

=== Singles ===
Title	Year	Album
"Letters"	2011	Come to Me
"Come to Me"	2012	Come to Me
"Xtra"	2013	Come to Me
"Clear My Name"	2018	Clear My Name
"Take the Lead" (feat. ThaiBeats)	2020	—N/a
"Run the Water"	2021	Clear My Name (Remix EP)
"One Way Ride"	2021	—N/a
"Time Out"	2022	—N/a
"Migrating Fears"	2024	—N/a
