= Matt Bianco discography =

- Studio albums: 16
- EPs: 4
- Compilation albums: 11
- Singles: 47
- Video albums: 2

The discography of British sophisti-pop/jazz-funk band Matt Bianco comprises sixteen studio albums, eleven compilations, four EPs, forty-seven singles, and two video releases.

In terms of commercial performance, the band's most internationally successful period were the years 1984–1988 when they were signed to WEA, a division of Warner Music Group. In the following years, Matt Bianco released their music through East West Records, Victor Entertainment, ZYX Music, EmArcy Records and earMUSIC, among others.

== Albums ==
=== Studio albums ===
Title	Details	Peak chart positions										Certifications
Title	Details	UK	AUS	AUT	GER	ITA	NL	NZ	SPA	SWE	SWI	Certifications
Whose Side Are You On?	Released: 10 August 1984; Label: WEA; Formats: CD, LP, MC	35	38	1	3	16	7	33	26	45	12	UK: Gold
Matt Bianco	Released: March 1986; Label: WEA; Formats: CD, LP, MC	26	89	1	8	15	5	9	25	39	3	UK: Silver; SWI: Gold
Indigo	Released: 27 June 1988; Label: WEA; Formats: CD, LP, MC	23	96	3	35	18	20	—	25	—	16	UK: Gold; SPA: Platinum
Samba in Your Casa	Released: November 1991; Label: East West, WEA; Formats: CD, LP, MC	—	172	—	—	—	—	—	—	—	—	
Another Time Another Place	Released: 22 September 1993 (Note: Japan-only release. Released internationally in 1994.); Label: Victor, ZYX Music; Formats: CD, MC	—	—	—	—	—	—	—	—	—	—	
Gran Via	Released: 21 April 1995; Label: Victor, ZYX Music; Formats: CD, MC	—	—	—	—	—	—	—	—	—	—	
World Go Round	Released: July 1997; Label: Victor, EMI; Formats: CD, MC	—	—	—	—	—	—	—	—	—	—	
Rico	Released: 4 October 2000 (Note: Japan-only release.); Label: Victor; Formats: CD	—	—	—	—	—	—	—	—	—	—	
Echoes	Released: 3 July 2002; Label: Victor; Formats: CD	—	—	—	—	—	—	—	—	—	—	
Matt's Mood (Matt Bianco featuring Basia)	Released: 26 May 2004; Label: EmArcy, Universal; Formats: CD	—	—	—	83	68	91	—	—	—	—	
Hifi Bossanova	Released: 20 May 2009; Label: earMUSIC, Victor; Formats: CD, digital download	—	—	—	—	—	—	—	—	—	—	
Hideaway	Released: 21 November 2012; Label: earMUSIC, Victor; Formats: CD, digital download	—	—	—	—	—	—	—	—	—	—	
The Things You Love (Matt Bianco (Mark Reilly) Meets New Cool Collective)	Released: 27 May 2016; Label: earMUSIC, Dox; Formats: CD, LP, digital download	—	—	—	—	—	200	—	—	—	—	
Gravity	Released: 17 July 2017; Label: Must Have, Victor; Formats: CD, digital download	—	—	—	—	—	—	—	—	—	—	
High Anxiety (Matt Bianco & New Cool Collective)	Released: 27 November 2020; Label: Dox; Formats: CD, digital download	—	—	—	—	—	—	—	—	—	—	
Masquerader	Released: 12 September 2025; Label: Matt Entertainment, Ltd.; Formats: CD, digital download	—	—	—	—	—	—	—	—	—	—	
"—" denotes releases that did not chart or were not released in that territory

=== Compilation albums ===
Title	Details	Peak chart positions			Certifications
Title	Details	UK	AUS	NL	Certifications
The Best of Matt Bianco	Released: 22 October 1990; Label: East West; Formats: CD, LP, MC	49	147	66	UK: Silver
Yeah! Yeah! – 16 Classic Tracks	Released: September 1993; Label: East West; Formats: CD, MC	—	—	—	
A/Collection	Released: 23 September 1998 (Note: Japan-only release. Released internationally in 2000.); Label: Victor; Formats: CD	—	—	—	
Sunshine Day – Summer Best Collection	Released: 14 July 2004; Label: Victor; Formats: CD	—	—	—	
Wap Bam Boogie	Released: 22 February 2006; Label: Victor; Formats: CD	—	—	—	
The Best of Matt Bianco, Part 2	Released: 24 April 2008; Label: Matt Bianco; Formats: digital download	—	—	—	
Free Soul – Drive with Matt Bianco	Released: 17 June 2009; Label: Victor; Formats: CD	—	—	—	
Sunshine Days – The Official Greatest Hits	Released: 18 June 2010; Label: earMUSIC; Formats: CD, digital download	—	—	—	
Platinum Best	Released: 29 October 2013; Label: Victor; Formats: 2×CD	—	—	—	
Remixes & Rarities	Released: 15 April 2022; Label: Cherry Pop; Formats: 2×CD	—	—	—	
The Essential Matt Bianco: Re-Imagined, Re-Loved	Released: 3 June 2022; Label: Matt Entertainment; Formats: 2×CD	—	—	—	
"—" denotes releases that did not chart or were not released in that territory

=== Video albums ===
Title	Details
Matt Bianco	Released: 1988; Label: WEA; Formats: VHS
The Best of Matt Bianco	Released: 1990; Label: Warner Music Vision; Formats: VHS

== EPs ==
Year	Title	Details
1994	Another Remix	Released: 23 February 1994; Label: Victor; Formats: CD
2013	The Beach Club Mixes	Released: 13 September 2013; Label: earMUSIC; Formats: digital download
2015	The Things You Love (Matt Bianco (Mark Reilly) Meets New Cool Collective)	Released: 6 November 2015; Label: Dox; Formats: 10", digital download
2019	Gravity Deluxe EP	Released: 20 September 2019; Label: Matt Entertainment; Formats: digital download

== Singles ==
Year	Single	Peak chart positions										Album
Year	Single	UK	AUS	BEL (FL)	CAN	GER	IRE	IT	NL	SPA	SWI	Album
1984	"Get Out of Your Lazy Bed"	15	—	14	—	31	8	—	25	—	14	Whose Side Are You On?
1984	"Sneaking Out the Back Door"	44	—	—	—	—	22	15	—	8	—	Whose Side Are You On?
1984	"Whose Side Are You On?"	83	57	—	70	—	—	—	22	—	—	Whose Side Are You On?
1984	"Half a Minute"	23	—	—	—	19	—	—	—	—	—	Whose Side Are You On?
1985	"More Than I Can Bear"	50	—	—	—	20	—	25	18	—	—	Whose Side Are You On?
1985	"Yeh Yeh"	13	64	23	86	7	15	17	27	—	10	Matt Bianco
1986	"Just Can't Stand It"	66	—	35	—	38	—	—	40	—	14	Matt Bianco
1986	"Dancing in the Street"	64	—	—	—	—	—	—	—	—	—	Matt Bianco
1986	"Undercover"	—	—	—	—	—	—	—	—	—	—	Matt Bianco
1986	"More Than I Can Bear" (Re-Recorded Version) (Note: 1986 re-recording of "More Than I Can Bear" was only included on the North American re-release of the Matt Bianco album.)	—	—	—	—	—	—	—	—	—	—	Matt Bianco
1988	"Don't Blame It on That Girl" (Note: "Wap Bam Boogie" was originally released as a double A-side single with "Don't Blame It on That Girl" in 1988 and as a single in its own right in 1990.)	11	—	32	—	—	8	7	26	27	—	Indigo
1988	"Good Times"	55	—	—	—	—	—	—	47	31	—	Indigo
1989	"Nervous"	59	—	—	—	—	22	—	—	—	—	Indigo
1989	"Say It's Not Too Late"	—	—	—	—	—	—	—	—	—	—	Indigo
1990	"Fire in the Blood"	—	—	—	—	—	—	—	—	—	—	The Best of Matt Bianco
1990	"Wap Bam Boogie"	76	178	—	—	—	—	—	—	—	—	The Best of Matt Bianco
1991	"Macumba"	—	—	—	—	—	—	—	—	—	—	Samba in Your Casa
1991	"You're the Rhythm"	—	—	—	—	—	—	—	—	—	—	Samba in Your Casa
1992	"What a Fool Believes"	97	—	—	—	—	23	—	—	—	—	Samba in Your Casa
1993	"Our Love"	—	—	—	—	71	—	—	—	—	—	Another Time Another Place
1993	"Can You Feel It"	—	—	—	—	—	—	—	—	—	—	Another Time Another Place
1993	"You & I"	—	—	—	—	—	—	—	—	—	—	Another Time Another Place
1994	"Buddy Love"	—	—	—	—	—	—	—	—	—	—	Another Time Another Place
1995	"A Day in Your Life"	—	—	—	—	—	—	—	—	—	—	Gran Via
1995	"Lost in You"	—	—	—	—	—	—	—	—	—	—	Gran Via
1997	"Sunshine Day"	—	—	—	—	—	—	—	—	—	—	World Go Round
1997	"Gypsy Lady"	—	—	—	—	—	—	—	—	—	—	World Go Round
1997	"Altozano"	—	—	—	—	—	—	—	—	—	—	World Go Round
1998	"River of Dreams"	—	—	—	—	—	—	—	—	—	—	World Go Round
1998	"Boogie Mi Vista"	—	—	—	—	—	—	—	—	—	—	A/Collection
2000	"Cha Cha Cuba"	—	—	—	—	—	—	—	—	—	—	Rico
2001	"Boogaloo"	—	—	—	—	—	—	—	—	—	—	Rico
2002	"Fire"	—	—	—	—	—	—	—	—	—	—	Echoes
2004	"Ordinary Day"	—	—	—	—	—	—	—	—	—	—	Matt's Mood
2004	"La Luna"	—	—	—	—	—	—	—	—	—	—	Matt's Mood
2004	"Ronnie's Samba"	—	—	—	—	—	—	—	—	—	—	Matt's Mood
2009	"Hifi Bossanova"	—	—	—	—	—	—	—	—	—	—	Hifi Bossanova
2009	"Lost in You"	—	—	—	—	—	—	—	—	—	—	Hifi Bossanova
2015	"The Things You Love" (with New Cool Collective)	—	—	—	—	—	—	—	—	—	—	The Things You Love
2017	"Joyride"	—	—	—	—	—	—	—	—	—	—	Gravity
2017	"Summer in the City"	—	—	—	—	—	—	—	—	—	—	Gravity
2019	"Dancin' Easy"	—	—	—	—	—	—	—	—	—	—	Gravity Deluxe EP
2019	"That's Life"	—	—	—	—	—	—	—	—	—	—	Gravity Deluxe EP
2020	"The Spice of Life" (with New Cool Collective)	—	—	—	—	—	—	—	—	—	—	High Anxiety
2022	"Matt's Mood" (2022 Version)	—	—	—	—	—	—	—	—	—	—	The Essential Matt Bianco: Re-Imagined, Re-Loved
2022	"More Than I Can Bear" (2022 Version)	—	—	—	—	—	—	—	—	—	—	The Essential Matt Bianco: Re-Imagined, Re-Loved
2022	"Wap Bam Boogie" (2022 Version)	—	—	—	—	—	—	—	—	—	—	The Essential Matt Bianco: Re-Imagined, Re-Loved
"—" denotes releases that did not chart or were not released in that territory
