= The Best of Matt Bianco =

Greatest hits album by Matt Bianco
- Released: 22 October 1990
- Recorded: 1983–1990
- Genre: Sophisti-pop; jazz fusion; Latin pop; dance
- Length: 70:38
- Label: East West
- Producer: Mark Fisher; Mark Reilly

Matt Bianco chronology
Indigo (1988)	The Best of Matt Bianco (1990)	Samba in Your Casa (1991)

Professional ratings
Review scores
Source	Rating
AllMusic	4.5/5 stars

The Best of Matt Bianco is a compilation album by British band Matt Bianco, released in 1990 by East West Records.

The album was originally slated for 15 October release, but eventually premiered a week later. It consists of the band's greatest hits from their first three studio albums: Whose Side Are You On?, Matt Bianco and Indigo, and the new track and lead single "Fire in the Blood". The second single was "Wap Bam Boogie", originally from Indigo and side B to the single "Don't Blame It on That Girl", which had been a club hit in its own right.

== Track listing ==
=== CD edition ===
No.	Title	Writer(s)	Length
1.	"Don't Blame It on That Girl"	Mark Fisher, Mark Reilly	3:50
2.	"Yeh-Yeh"	Rodgers Grant, Jon Hendricks, Pat Patrick	3:18
3.	"Half a Minute"	Reilly, Kito Poncioni, Danny White	3:48
4.	"More Than I Can Bear"	Reilly, White	4:24
5.	"Sneaking Out the Back Door"	Reilly, White	3:48
6.	"Fire in the Blood" (7")	Fisher, Reilly	3:27
7.	"Good Times"	Fisher, Reilly	4:17
8.	"Matt's Mood"	Reilly, White	5:24
9.	"Get Out of Your Lazy Bed"	Reilly, White	3:29
10.	"Wap Bam Boogie"	Fisher, Reilly	7:32
11.	"Dancing in the Street"	Fisher, Reilly	3:56
12.	"Whose Side Are You On?"	Reilly, White	3:25
13.	"Say It's Not Too Late"	Fisher, Reilly	4:59
14.	"Nervous"	Fisher, Reilly	4:29
15.	"We've Got the Mood – Matt's Mood '90"	Reilly, White	5:48
16.	"Fire in the Blood" (12")	Fisher, Reilly	4:51

=== LP edition ===
Side A

No.	Title	Writer(s)	Length
1.	"Don't Blame It on That Girl"	Mark Fisher, Mark Reilly	3:46
2.	"Yeh-Yeh"	Rodgers Grant, Jon Hendricks, Pat Patrick	3:15
3.	"Sneaking Out the Back Door"	Reilly, White	3:45
4.	"Just Can't Stand It"	Fisher, Reilly	3:53
5.	"Half a Minute"	Reilly, Kito Poncioni, Danny White	4:45
6.	"Dancing in the Street"	Fisher, Reilly	3:53

Side B

No.	Title	Writer(s)	Length
1.	"Fire in the Blood"	Fisher, Reilly	5:20
2.	"Wap Bam Boogie"	Fisher, Reilly	3:23
3.	"Good Times"	Fisher, Reilly	4:12
4.	"More Than I Can Bear"	Reilly, White	4:20
5.	"Get Out of Your Lazy Bed"	Reilly, White	3:23
6.	"Matt's Mood"	Reilly, White	4:26

== Charts ==
Chart performance for The Best of Matt Bianco
Chart (1990–1991)	Peak position
Australian Albums (ARIA)	147
Dutch Albums (Album Top 100)	66
Hungarian Albums (MAHASZ)	39
UK Albums (OCC)	49

== Certifications ==
Region	Certification	Certified units/sales
United Kingdom (BPI)	Silver	60,000^{^}
^{^} Shipments figures based on certification alone.
