= Matt Bianco (album) =

Studio album by Matt Bianco
- Released: March 1986
- Recorded: 1985–1986
- Studio: P.W.L. Studios, Workhouse, Marquee, Mayfair, Sarm West
- Genre: Sophisti-pop, Latin pop, dance
- Length: 42:49 (LP); 44:55 (CD)
- Label: WEA
- Producer: Mark Reilly, Mark Fisher, Phil Harding

Matt Bianco chronology
Whose Side Are You On? (1984)	Matt Bianco (1986)	Indigo (1988)

Professional ratings
Review scores
Source	Rating
AllMusic	3/5 stars
Music Week	Favourable
Smash Hits	8/10

Matt Bianco is the self-titled second studio album by the British band Matt Bianco, released in 1986 through WEA. For this album, the band's line-up comprised vocalist Mark Reilly and musician Mark Fisher. Jenni Evans sings backing vocals on nearly every track (and lead vocal on two cuts), but was not listed as an official band member.

The album was a critical and commercial success, and spawned one of the band's biggest hits, "Yeh Yeh".

== Background ==
Jenni Evans and Mark Fisher were brought in after the departure of Polish singer Basia Trzetrzelewska and keyboard player Danny White, who left the original trio to establish the singer's solo career under the name of Basia.

Evans would leave Matt Bianco shortly after this album, but Fisher would become a long-term member of the group. Fisher, a keyboardist, composer, and studio wizard, contributed a more contemporary sound compared to the band's earlier work. The use of synthesizers increased notably: Yamaha's DX-7 can be heard providing the slap bass in most songs, but the choice of noted studio musicians remained consistent for this album, with Ronnie Ross being the most prominent example.

After completing this album, Matt Bianco took a 13-piece band on a European tour that saw them perform in front of an audience of more than 250,000 attendees in total.

== Critical reception ==
Simon Mills of Smash Hits praised the album, stating that the songs "are totally frivolous and throwaway but at the same time indeniably catchy and irresistible", and wondered why Reilly was not a famous pop star, since "he's devastatingly handsome" and "writes fab, squeaky clean Euro-Latin pop tunes". In a favourable Music Week review, the album was praised for its "stylish bossa nova tunes", and described as "perfect for radio".

== Chart performance ==
In terms of its chart position in the United Kingdom, this album was more successful than the group's debut release, reaching number 26. It also provided three chart singles, although the only one to make the top 50 was the lead "Yeh Yeh". This was issued as a single in September 1985, about six months prior to the album. A cover version of a song which had been a UK number one for Georgie Fame and the Blue Flames in 1965, Matt Bianco's version of "Yeh Yeh" reached number 13 and stayed in the British charts for 10 weeks.

The other two singles from this album, "Just Can't Stand It" and "Dancing in the Street", were both released in 1986, and only charted for 2 and 3 weeks, at no. 66 and no. 64 respectively. Additionally, "Undercover" was released as a single in Germany and France only, but failed to chart.

== Track listing ==
=== Original release ===
The CD and LP versions of this album feature a minor difference: "Yeh Yeh" appears in its 12" Dance Mix on the CD and on some LP editions, while the 7" version only appears on some vinyl records. Meanwhile, both the 7" and 12" versions are featured on some (but not all) cassette editions of the album.

1. "Yeh Yeh" (Single Version) – 3:17 (on some long playing editions only)
  "Yeh Yeh" (12" Dance Mix) – 5:23 (on CD edition and on some LP editions)
2. "Dancing in the Street" – 3:56
3. "Undercover" – 4:32
4. "Fly by Night" – 3:50
5. "Smooth" – 4:37
6. "I Wonder" – 3:55
7. "Just Can't Stand It" – 3:54
8. "Summer Song" – 5:34
9. "Sweetest Love Affair" – 3:43
10. "Up Front" – 5:31

=== 2017 expanded deluxe edition ===
Disc One

1. "Yeh Yeh" (12" Dance Mix) – 5:30
2. "Dancing in the Street" – 3:54
3. "Undercover" – 4:32
4. "Fly by Night" – 3:49
5. "Smooth" – 4:37
6. "I Wonder" – 3:53
7. "Just Can't Stand It" – 3:52
8. "Summer Song" – 5:33
9. "Sweetest Love Affair" – 3:43
10. "Up Front" – 5:31
11. "Yeh Yeh" (Single Version) – 3:16
12. "Up Front" (Single Version) – 4:18
13. "More Than I Can Bear" (Re-recorded Version) – 4:20
14. "Undercover" (Single Version) – 3:35
15. "Smooth" (Extra Smooth) – 5:26
16. "Just Can't Stand It" (Maximum K Mix) – 5:20
17. "Dancing in the Street" (Dance Mix) – 7:00

Disc Two

1. "Undercover" (12" Version) – 5:34
2. "It's Getting Late" (Extended Version) – 4:33
3. "Dancing in the Street" (Dub) – 6:23
4. "Dancing in the Street" (Instrumental) – 5:27
5. "Dancing in the Street" (Medley Megamix) – 8:07
6. "Just Can't Stand It" (Live) – 8:28
7. "Get Out of Your Lazy Bed" (Live) – 4:15
8. "I Need It" (Live) – 4:53
9. "Up Front" (Live) – 6:40
10. "Love Situation" (7" Version) – 3:36
11. "Love Situation" (Broadway Mix – (Tooting)) – 6:07
12. "Love Situation" (Dub) – 4:56
13. "Love Situation" (Remix) – 5:17
14. "Love Situation" (Instrumental) – 3:34

== Personnel ==
Matt Bianco:

- Mark Reilly: lead male vocals; background vocals on track 4
- Mark Fisher: keyboards, mirage bass, slap bass, DX-7 slap bass, DX-7 guitar, melodica, brass arrangement

with:

- Jenni Evans: lead female vocals on tracks 4 and 10; background vocals on tracks 1, 2, 3, 6, 7, 8 and 9
- Jordan Bailey: background vocals on tracks 1 and 2
- Shirley Lewis, Helena Springs: background vocals on track 5
- Trevor Murrel: drums on tracks 3, 6 and 9
- Robin Jones: percussion on tracks 1, 2, 3, 4, 8 and 10
- Steve Sidwell: trumpet on track 1; trumpet solo on tracks 3 and 7
- Ronnie Ross: alto sax on tracks 3, 8 and 10; baritone sax on tracks 1, 3, 4, 5 and 9
- Bill Eldridge: trumpet on track 2
- Stuart Brooks: trumpet on track 2
- Martin Dobson: tenor sax on track 2
- Dave Bishop: tenor sax on track 2
- Tony Fisher: trumpet on tracks 3 and 9; flugelhorn on tracks 2 and 4
- Derek Watkins: trumpet on tracks 3 and 9; flugelhorn on track 3
- Bert Ezard: trumpet and flugelhorn on track 3
- Cliff Hardie: trombone on tracks 3 and 9
- Stan Sulzmann: tenor sax on tracks 3 and 9
- Jim Sullivan: acoustic guitar on track 4
- Jamie Talbot: alto sax on track 6
- John Barclay: trumpet on track 9

=== Production and engineering ===
- Phil Harding: production for PWL, and sound engineering
- Produced by Reilly, Fisher, Harding (except tracks 1 and 5, produced by Reilly, Harding)
- Duffy & Jamie: assistants @ P.W.L. Studios
- Stuart: assistant @ Workhouse
- Gerry & Stuart: assistants @ Marquee
- Tim Young: mastering and digital mixing @ CBS Studios

=== Other staff ===
- Haydn Cottam: sleeve painting
- Graham Smith: sleeve design and sleeve photography
- Sheila Rock: sleeve photography
- Carl Leighton-Pope for Bonaire Group: management

== Charts ==
=== Weekly charts ===
Chart (1986)	Peak position
Australia (Kent Music Report)	89
Austrian Albums (Ö3 Austria)	1
Dutch Albums (Album Top 100)	5
Finnish Albums (Suomen virallinen lista)	31
French Albums (SNEP)	11
German Albums (Offizielle Top 100)	8
Italian Albums (Musica e dischi)	15
New Zealand Albums (RMNZ)	9
Swedish Albums (Sverigetopplistan)	45
Swiss Albums (Schweizer Hitparade)	3
UK Albums (OCC)	26

=== Year-end charts ===
Chart (1986)	Position
Austrian Albums (Ö3 Austria)	23
Dutch Albums (Album Top 100)	38
German Albums (Offizielle Top 100)	49
Swiss Albums (Schweizer Hitparade)	29

== Certifications ==
Region	Certification	Certified units/sales
Switzerland (IFPI Switzerland)	Gold	25,000^{^}
United Kingdom (BPI)	Silver	60,000^{^}
^{^} Shipments figures based on certification alone.
