= Indigo (Matt Bianco album) =

Studio album by Matt Bianco
- Released: 27 June 1988
- Genre: Sophisti-pop; jazz fusion; Latin pop; dance
- Length: 46:48 (LP); 57:23 (CD)
- Label: WEA
- Producer: Mark Fisher; Mark Reilly; Clay Ostwald; Jorge Casa; Emilio Estefan

Matt Bianco chronology
Matt Bianco (1986)	Indigo (1988)	The Best of Matt Bianco (1990)

Professional ratings
Review scores
Source	Rating
AllMusic	3/5 stars
Music & Media	Favourable
Smash Hits	4/10

Indigo is the third studio album by British band Matt Bianco, released in June 1988 through WEA.

== Overview ==
Indigo was Warner Brothers' attempt to launch Matt Bianco in the United States, hence the hiring of Emilio Estefan (Gloria Estefan's husband) as producer. He contributed to three of the tracks on the album, including the first single "Don't Blame It on That Girl".

By reaching number 23 in the UK Albums Chart, Indigo became the highest-charting album for the group. It also included their highest-charting single, the double A-side "Don't Blame It on That Girl"/"Wap-Bam-Boogie", reaching number 11 in the UK Singles Chart. It also reached the top 10 on Billboard's Dance Music/Club Play Singles chart – their first song to chart in the US. It was followed by three more singles: "Good Times", "Nervous", and "Say It's Not Too Late", none of which had any commercial success, stalling in the lower parts of the charts – "Say It's Not Too Late" did not even enter the UK Top 75, and it would be included as a B-side on "What a Fool Believes", a single from the band's fourth studio album, Samba in Your Casa from 1991.

The success of "Wap-Bam-Boogie" pushed the group not only to release a number of remix versions of the hit, at the time and in the following years, but it prompted them towards more of a dance influence in their style which, though disappointing early fans, would gain them new ones; however, maybe for a matter of balance, their next studio album, Samba in Your Casa, would feature a much more Latin pop-oriented sound than their previous albums, though not abandoning the dance rhythms.

== Track listing ==
All tracks written and arranged by Mark Reilly and Mark Fisher.

No.	Title	Length
1.	"Don't Blame It on That Girl"	3:46
2.	"Nervous"	4:13
3.	"Slide"	4:16
4.	"Say It's Not Too Late"	4:56
5.	"Wap Bam Boogie"	7:29
6.	"Good Times"	4:21
7.	"R&B"	4:49
8.	"Hanging On"	4:29
9.	"Jack of Clubs"	4:17
10.	"Indigo"	4:12
11.	"Don't Blame It on That Girl" (12" Mix)	6:10
12.	"Good Times" (Miami Mix)	4:25

Note

- Tracks 11 and 12 on CD only.

== Personnel ==
Adapted from the album's liner notes.

Matt Bianco

- Mark Reilly – vocals
- Mark Fisher – keyboards, piano, additional synths, melodica, brass arrangements

Other musicians

- Robert Ahwai – guitar
- Ambassador – vocals (track 4)
- Guy Barker – trumpet, flugelhorn
- Randy Barlow – trumpet
- Ed Calle – tenor saxophone
- Jorge Casas – bass guitar
- Paquito Hechavarría – acoustic piano
- Sheila Ferguson – backing vocals
- Weston Foster – backing vocals
- Joy Francis – backing vocals
- Robin Jones – percussion
- Dee Lewis – percussion
- Shirley Lewis – backing vocals
- Teddy Mulet – trumpet
- Trevor Murrel – drums
- Clay Ostwald – keyboards, synth programming, drum programming
- Rafael Padilla – percussion
- Ronnie Ross – brass, saxophone
- Jon Secada – backing vocals
- Jamie Talbot – saxophone
- Phil Todd – saxophone
- Dig Wayne – backing vocals
- Tony Fisher, Derek Watkins, Dave Bishop, Stan Sulzmann – brass

=== Production ===
- Ian Curnow – additional programming
- Brad Davis – engineer
- Pete Hammond – mixing
- Phil Harding – mixing, remixing
- Sheila Rock – photography
- Paul Samuelson – engineer
- Graham Smith – photography, sleeve design
- Dana Horowitz, Patrice, Bob, Head, Cliff, Giles Scrumpy, Mickey Mulligan, Kevin, Tony, Carl – assistants
- Tracks 1, 11 & 12 produced by Emilio Estefan, Jorge Casas and Clay Ostwald
- Tracks 2–10 produced and arranged by Mark Reilly and Mark Fisher
- Track 1 engineered and mixed by Eric Schilling

== Charts ==
Chart (1988)	Peak position
Australia (Kent Music Report)	96
Austrian Albums (Ö3 Austria)	9
Dutch Albums (Album Top 100)	20
Finnish Albums (Suomen virallinen lista)	23
German Albums (Offizielle Top 100)	35
Italian Albums (Musica e dischi)	18
Swiss Albums (Schweizer Hitparade)	16
UK Albums (OCC)	23

== Certifications ==
Certifications for Indigo
Region	Certification	Certified units/sales
Spain (Promusicae)	Platinum	100,000^{^}
United Kingdom (BPI)	Gold	100,000^{^}
^{^} Shipments figures based on certification alone.
