= Commonwealth Jazz Club =

1965 Australian/Canadian/British TV music series

- Genre: Jazz music
- Countries of origin: Australia; Canada; United Kingdom
- Original language: English
- No. of seasons: 1
- No. of episodes: 6

Production
- Running time: 30 minutes

Original release
- Network: ABC; BBC; CBC
- Release: 1965 – 1965

Commonwealth Jazz Club is a 1965 music television miniseries that was co-produced in Australia, Canada and the United Kingdom.

== Premise ==
Jazz music performances were featured in this six-programme co-production of ABC (Australia), the BBC (Britain) and CBC Television (Canada). Each nation produced two half-hour episodes for the series.

== Scheduling ==
In Canada four of the Commonwealth Jazz Club episodes, including both Canadian contributions, were broadcast on CBC Television Thursdays at 10:30 p.m. (Eastern) from 9 to 30 September 1965.

== Episodes ==
- Australia: (Peter Page director) Graeme Bell and his All Stars
- Australia: (Peter Page director) Don Burrows Quartet with Judy Bailey (piano)
- Canada: (Paddy Sampson producer) Jimmy Dale Orchestra and the Sonny Greenwich Quartet
- Canada: (Paddy Sampson producer) Tony Collacott Trio (Collacott piano, Bob Price acoustic double bass, Ricky Marcus drums) and the Rob McConnell Quartet (McConnell trombone, Ed Bickert guitar, Bill Britto acoustic double bass, Bruce Farquhar drums)
- United Kingdom: (Colin Charman director) Benny Green presenter, The Commonwealth Big Band (Tubby Hayes music director, Bob Burns, Art Ellefson, Freddy Logan acoustic double bass, Ronnie Ross reeds, Ray Swinfield, Gib Wallace trombone, Kenny Wheeler trumpet)
- United Kingdom: (Colin Charman director) Benny Green presenter, Kenny Baker trumpet, Tony Coe, Jackie Dougan drums, Spike Heatley acoustic double bass, Dudley Moore piano, Tommy Whittle tenor sax.
