= Whose Side Are You On? (disambiguation) =

Whose Side Are You On? is a 1984 album by Matt Bianco. It may also refer to:

- "Whose Side Are You On?", a Matt Bianco song from this album
- "Whose Side Are You On?", a song by Bette Midler from The Rose (soundtrack), 1979
- "Whose Side Are You On?", a song from Fireboy, a 1993 album by Grant McLennan
- "Whose Side Are You On?", a 1986 episode of The Bill
- "Whose Side Are You On?", a 1992 episode of The Bill
- "Whose Side Are You On?", a 2004 episode of Everybody Loves Raymond
- Whose Side Are You On?, the working title for the British television panel game Argumental
