= List of sophisti-pop artists =

List of musical artists considered sophisti-pop

This is a list of artists retrospectively classified under the genre sophisti-pop. The term has been applied to pop music that emerged during the mid-1980s in the UK under the New Romantic and new wave movements, which incorporated elements of pop, rock, jazz, and soul. Music so classified often made extensive use of electronic keyboards, synthesizers and polished arrangements, particularly horn sections.

== Sophisti-pop artists ==
- ABC
- Altered Images
- Animal Nightlife
- Arkady Mandjiev (on the track "Tsahan tsasn")
- Aztec Camera
- Basia
- The Beautiful South
- Black (singer)
- The Blow Monkeys
- The Blue Nile
- Breathe
- China Crisis
- The Christians
- Crowded House
- Curiosity Killed the Cat
- Danny Wilson
- Deacon Blue
- Double
- The Dream Academy
- Everything but the Girl
- ≠ Bryan Ferry
- Go West
- Haircut One Hundred
- Hipsway
- Hue and Cry
- Joe Jackson
- Johnny Hates Jazz
- Laid Back
- Level 42
- Living in a Box
- Love and Money
- Matt Bianco
- Nick Heyward
- Orange Juice
- Orchestral Manoeuvres in the Dark (on The Pacific Age)
- Prefab Sprout
- ≠ Roxy Music
- Sade
- Scritti Politti
- Simply Red
- Belouis Some
- Spandau Ballet
- Sting
- The Style Council
- Swing Out Sister
- Tears for Fears
- Wa Wa Nee
- Jessie Ware
- Wet Wet Wet
- Ultravox

=== Notes ===
- ≠ indicates a Rock and Roll Hall of Fame inductee
