= Pedalboard =

Pedalboard may refer to:

- Pedal keyboard, a set of pedals analogous to a manual keyboard
- Guitar pedalboard, a container for guitar effects pedals
