= Another Time Another Place =

Studio album by Matt Bianco
- Released: 22 September 1993
- Genre: Latin pop, jazz-pop, soul, dance
- Length: 43:43
- Label: JVC-Victor, ZYX Music
- Producer: Matt Bianco

Matt Bianco chronology
Samba in Your Casa (1991)	Another Time Another Place (1993)	Gran Via (1995)

Professional ratings
Review scores
Source	Rating
AllMusic	4/5 stars

Another Time Another Place is the fifth studio album by the British band Matt Bianco, originally released by JVC-Victor in 1993 only in Japan. The following year, it was released in Germany by ZYX Music.

== Overview ==
This was Matt Bianco's first album after splitting from Warner Brothers. Mark Fisher and Mark Reilly recorded it in the Fishbowl, Fisher's own studio on the outskirts of London. This record saw a new group of session musicians participating in the production, although Robin Jones contributed percussive layers that support the songs' rhythm structure. Following Ronnie Ross's passing in 1991, the brass section was reorganised as well, giving the record a different timbre.

The record was distributed in parts of Asia, Western Europe and the US, but only JVC-Victor in Japan really made an effort in promoting it to the local audience. Due to lack of airplay, it failed to have any major impact in the rest of the world.

The first single was "Our Love", which charted at no. 71 in Germany in 1994, and was the last charting Matt Bianco single. "You & I" and "Buddy Love" followed as second singles in Japan and Germany respectively, but neither was a commercial success.

== Track listing ==
All songs written by Matt Bianco except where indicated.

1. "Our Love" – 4:50
2. "The World Is a Ghetto" (Papa Dee Allen, Harold Brown, B. B. Dickerson, Lonnie Jordan, Charles Miller, Lee Oskar, Howard E. Scott) – 4:45
3. "You and I" – 4:14
4. "Buddy Love" – 4:37
5. "Can You Feel It" – 4:43
6. "I Need You Now" – 5:15
7. "Head over Heels" – 4:15
8. "Your Destiny" – 4:35
9. "Another Time Another Place" – 6:30
10. "Buddy's Reprise (Everybody Move)" – 5:04
11. "Love Life" – 4:03

Note

- Tracks 10 and 11 on the US edition only.
