= Jill Furmanovsky =

British photographer

- Born: 1953 (age 72–73); Southern Rhodesia
- Education: Central Saint Martins
- Known for: Photography

Jill Furmanovsky (born 1953) is a British photographer who has specialised in documenting rock musicians. She has photographed many major rock musicians, including Bob Dylan, Led Zeppelin, Pink Floyd, Mike Oldfield, The Ramones, Bob Marley, Amy Winehouse, Eric Clapton, Blondie, The Police, The Clash, The Undertones, The Sex Pistols, The Pretenders and Oasis.

== Life and work ==
Born in Southern Rhodesia, Furmanovsky emigrated with her parents - her father subsequently worked at an architecture practice - and brother Michael to London in 1965. She studied textile and graphic design at Central Saint Martins College of Art and Design from 1972 to 1974. In 1972, she became the official photographer at the Rainbow Theatre, a significant venue for rock performances in the 1970s.

Furmanovsky's book, The Moment – 25 Years of Rock Photography was published in 1995, and an exhibition of her Oasis photographs, Was There Then, toured the UK and Ireland in 1997. The exhibition was followed by publication of the book Was There Then – A Photographic Journey with Oasis.

Photograph of Charlie Watts

Furmanovsky has received several awards for her music photography, including 'The Jane Bown Observer Portrait Award' for her portrait of Charlie Watts in 1992. Following in the lead of the photographic co-operative Magnum Photos, Furmanovsky established a website, rockarchive.com, in 1998. The aim was to make her work and that of photographic colleagues and visual artists more accessible to fans and collectors. To launch the project, Furmanovsky selected 30 classic black and white images of major rock artists from her 30-year archive, to make into an edition of 30 darkroom prints.

== Exhibitions ==
Chunk of Punk opened at the Barbican Music Library in April 2016 to celebrate 40 years of punk, putting together an exhibition combining Furmanovsky's favourite and many never-before-seen photographs with a selection of memorabilia, album artwork, and clippings. The show included shots of the Sex Pistols, Generation X, The Slits, Undertones, Debbie Harry, Joe Strummer, Paul Weller or The Ramones.

In April 2023, Furmanovsky presented Photographing the Invisible: 50 Years of Rock Photography at Manchester Central Library an exhibition about her half-century career photographing the world’s biggest artists and bands. Noel Gallagher, who helped curate the show, said: "She's the best". By December, Proud Galleries hosted Jill Furmanovsky: No Music, No Life an exhibition that displayed Furmanovsky's passion for music and her ability to capture its soul. The exhibition showcased some of the most celebrated shots from her extensive archive including images of Amy Winehouse, Pink Floyd, Joy Division, Miles Davis, Leonard Cohen, her award-winning portrait of Charlie Watts, and a whole area of the gallery was dedicated to her unique and intimate collection of Oasis photographs that reflect her close relationship with the band.

Coordinated by Sony Music Japan, two exhibitions in Japan highlighted Furmanovsky's key role in Oasis' story and imagery. Roppongi Museum celebrated the 30th anniversary of the band's debut with the special show Live Forever consisting of rare memorabilia from the archives of the band's management, including her photographs. At the same time, New Gallery presented Oasis Origin + Reconstruction, a collaboration between Furmanovsky and artist Kosuke Kawamura.

Street Level Photoworks presented REBELS & RENEGADES in Glasgow, a two-part exhibition featuring the work of Furmanovsky and Sheila Rock, two pioneering women photographers who captured the zeitgeist of punk and the post-punk unfolding in music and style.

== Awards ==
Furmanovsky was honoured with three awards in 2024: Amateur Photographer magazine gave her a Lifetime Achievement Award; So.Co crowned her Legend of the Year for her contribution to music photography, and in October she was awarded with the prestigious Abbey Road ICON Award that celebrated her long-standing connection with Abbey Road Studios. Noel Gallagher presented her the Award.

Throughout her career, Furmanovsky has captured some of Abbey Road's most known moments, including Pink Floyd’s Wish You Were Here recording session (1975) and Oasis recording Be Here Now (1997), and years later became the studio’s first Photographer in Residence (2017–2018). She then joined the judging panel for the inaugural Music Photography Awards in 2022 continuing her mission of encouraging and inspiring new generations of music photographers.

== Books ==
- The Moment: 25 Years of Rock Photography, 1995, London, Paper Tiger, ISBN 978-1850281498
- Was There Then Oasis. A Photographic Journey, 1997, London, Ebury Press, ISBN 978-0091863180
- Oasis: Knebworth: Two Nights That Will Live Forever, 2021, Cassell, with Daniel Rachel ISBN 978-1788402804
- Pink Floyd: The Dark Side Of The Moon: The Official 50th Anniversary Photobook, 2023, Thames & Hudson, with Pink Floyd, Aubrey Powell, et al ISBN 978-0349017358
- Oasis: Trying to find a way out of nowhere, 2025, Thames & Hudson, with Noel Gallagher ISBN 978-0500030646
