= Samba in Your Casa =

Studio album by Matt Bianco
- Released: 1 November 1991
- Genre: Latin pop, jazz, soul, dance
- Length: 43:23
- Label: East West
- Producer: Mark Reilly, Mark Fisher, Liminha

Matt Bianco chronology
The Best of Matt Bianco (1990)	Samba in Your Casa (1991)	Another Time Another Place (1993)

Professional ratings
Review scores
Source	Rating
Music & Media	Positive

Samba in Your Casa is the fourth studio album by British band Matt Bianco, released in 1991 by East West Records.

== Background ==
Samba in Your Casa was the band's first studio album in three years, after 1988's Indigo, and was preceded by their first greatest hits compilation, The Best of Matt Bianco, released in 1990. Unlike their typically jazz and soul early works, Samba in Your Casa was more oriented to Latin pop and dance music, adding rap parts and Spanglish lyrics.

The LP was mainly promoted by singles "Macumba" and a cover of "What a Fool Believes" (originally by Kenny Loggins and made famous by the Doobie Brothers), which did not get much airplay, although the latter charted in Ireland. "You're the Rhythm" was released as a single in select territories. The first single, "Macumba", besides two different remix versions by Bobby Summerfield, also contained a new remix of "Wap-Bam-Boogie" by Phil Harding and Ian Curnow.

The album did not achieve much commercial success in Europe, instead starting a loyal fan base for the group in Asia, especially Japan, though it was quite well received in Germany.

== Track listing ==
All tracks composed by Mark Fisher and Mark Reilly, except where noted.

1. "You're the Rhythm" – 4:21
2. "Macumba" (Mark Reilly, Liminha, Carlos Diaz, Gilberto Gil, Caetano Veloso) – 4:21
3. "Let It Whip" (Leon "Ndugu" Chancler, Reggie Andrews) – 4:53
4. "Strange Town" – 4:16
5. "The Night Has Just Begun" – 3:53
6. "True Love" – 4:38
7. "What a Fool Believes" (Kenny Loggins, Michael McDonald) – 4:25
8. "Lady of My Mind" – 3:53
9. "You're the Rhythm (Brazil)" – 3:52
10. "Samba in Your Casa" – 4:50

== Charts ==
Chart performance for Samba in Your Casa
Chart (1991)	Peak position
Australian Albums (ARIA)	172
