= Savoy Truffle =

- Cover of the Apple Publishing sheet music (depicting Paul McCartney)

Song by the Beatles

from the album The Beatles
- Released: 22 November 1968
- Recorded: 3, 5, 11 and 14 October 1968
- Studio: Trident and EMI, London
- Genre: Soul; blues rock; pop rock
- Length: 2:54
- Label: Apple
- Songwriter: George Harrison
- Producer: George Martin

"Savoy Truffle" is a song by the English rock band the Beatles from their 1968 album The Beatles (also known as "the White Album"). The song was written by George Harrison and inspired by his friend Eric Clapton's fondness for chocolate. The lyrics list the various flavours offered in Mackintosh's Good News chocolates and serve as a warning to Clapton about the detrimental effect that his gorging would have on his teeth. Along with Clapton's guest appearance on the White Album track "While My Guitar Gently Weeps" and Harrison reciprocating on Cream's "Badge", it is one of several songs that mark the start of a long-lasting musical association between the two guitarists.

The Beatles recorded "Savoy Truffle" in October 1968, towards the end of the five-month sessions for the album. An upbeat rock track in the soul genre, the song reflects Harrison's return to the guitar as his main musical instrument after two years of studying the Indian sitar. The recording includes a Chris Thomas-arranged horn section, and introduced the horn-heavy sound that became a feature of Harrison's music as a solo artist. Through the lyrics' reference to "Ob-La-Di, Ob-La-Da", the song is also an example of the Beatles' use of self-quotation in their later work.

On release, "Savoy Truffle" was viewed by many commentators as a sign of Harrison's growing maturity as a songwriter. Among more recent assessments, Ian MacDonald cited it as an example of the lesser material found on The Beatles, while Daryl Easlea of BBC Music describes it as one of the "doodles that delight" and "a fine counterweight" to "While My Guitar Gently Weeps". Ella Fitzgerald, Terry Manning and They Might Be Giants have also recorded the song.

== Background and inspiration ==
"Savoy Truffle" is a funny one written whilst hanging out with Eric Clapton in the sixties ... He always had toothache but he ate a lot of chocolates ... once he saw a box he had to eat them all.

— George Harrison, 1979

George Harrison wrote "Savoy Truffle" in September 1968, by which point the Beatles had been working on their eponymous double album (also known as "the White Album") for over three months. This period was one of disharmony within the band, following their mixed experiences while attending an advanced course in Transcendental Meditation in India early in the year, a group activity that had been led by Harrison's commitment to Eastern spirituality. Away from his work with the Beatles in 1968, Harrison increasingly spent time with Eric Clapton, leading to occasional musical collaborations between the two guitarists and a lifelong friendship. Having contributed to Harrison's solo album Wonderwall Music, Clapton was invited to play on his White Album track "While My Guitar Gently Weeps" on 6 September, marking a rare appearance by another rock musician on a Beatles recording as Harrison sought to defuse tensions within the band. (Note: Clapton also contributed to Harrison's debut project as a record producer, playing guitar on the June 1968 session for Jackie Lomax's single "Sour Milk Sea".)

In an interview with the NME in late September, Harrison said he was keen to depart from his image as "Mystical Beatle George" and now wanted to contribute songs without any profound message. (Note: In the same interview, Harrison joked that while his ideology was still aligned with his 1967 composition "Within You Without You", "I don't want to go into that any more 'cuz now I'm being a rock and roll star.") He wrote "Savoy Truffle" as a tribute to Clapton's sweet tooth. He derived the title and much of the lyrics from a box of Mackintosh's Good News chocolates, which Clapton began eating during one of his visits to Harrison's home. Many of the confectionery names used in the song are authentic; others, such as cherry cream, coconut fudge and pineapple heart, were Harrison's invention, based on the flavours listed inside the lid of the box. For the lyrics to the second of the song's bridge sections, Harrison received assistance from Derek Taylor, the press officer for the Beatles' new record label, Apple Records. In keeping with the theme of Harrison's composition, Taylor drew inspiration from the title of the American counterculture film You Are What You Eat, which was itself titled after a fashionable macrobiotic slogan.

Musicologist Walter Everett suggests that "Savoy Truffle" might have been an attempt to rewrite the Byrds' "less innocent" 1968 track "Artificial Energy", which warns of the dangers of amphetamines. The song also reflects Harrison's rediscovery of his passion for rhythm and blues. Coinciding with this, he had returned to the guitar as his main instrument in 1968, after two years of studying the sitar under the guidance of Indian classical musician Ravi Shankar. (Note: Harrison partly credited Clapton with his decision to relinquish the sitar. While filming Raga together in June 1968, in California, Shankar encouraged Harrison to find his musical roots; Harrison then met with Clapton and Jimi Hendrix in New York and opted to return to the guitar.)

== Composition ==
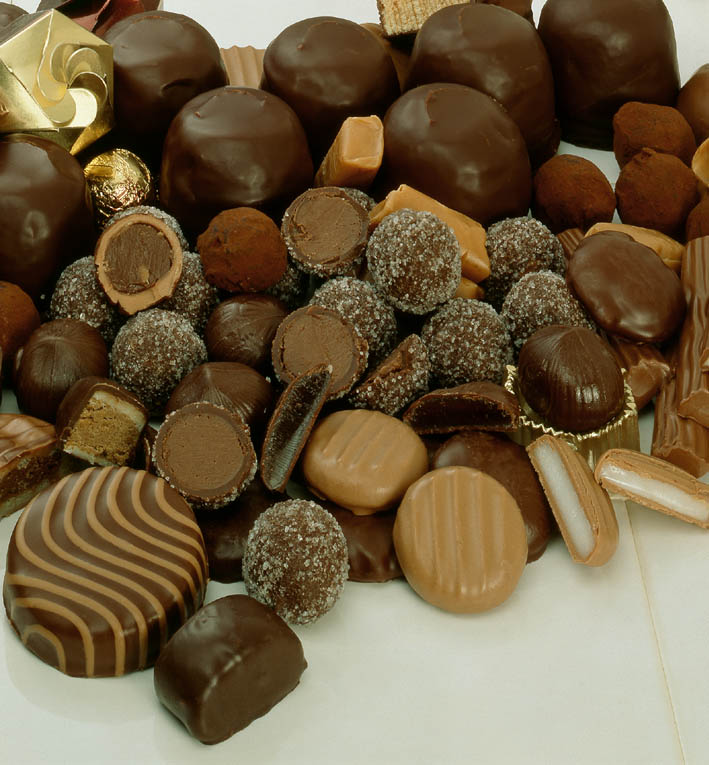
Chocolates with assorted fillings: a box of such confectionery, made by Mackintosh's, provided many of the lyrics to the song.

"Savoy Truffle" is primarily in the key of E minor, although the melody continually shifts to the parallel, major equivalent, in addition to anchoring briefly in G major. Musicologist Alan Pollack identifies the composition's harmonic style as one that "makes you feel constantly on the move, on the threshold of some new breakthrough", and he adds: "There are other Beatles' songs that exploit this triumvirate of keys (i.e. a parallel Major/minor pair and the relative Major), but never quite with such audacity." (Note: Over the middle eight, the verse's E-A-G-B chord pattern is recast in a manner that Everett likens to Paul McCartney's 1965 song "Yesterday".) Throughout, the meter is 4/4, with the exception of a number of bars in 6/8, delivered in an assertive, driving tempo. The song's main musical style is soul music, (Note: Author Jonathan Gould describes it as "a high-spirited soul song".) while its melody and mood partly recall "Sour Milk Sea", which Harrison wrote earlier in 1968.

In the verses, Harrison lists a variety of chocolate flavours, beginning with "creme tangerine" and "Montélimar". He employs wordplay to incorporate the Mackintosh's brand name in his closing phrase to the first verse: "yes, you know it's 'good news'". The refrain throughout the song – "But you'll have to have them all pulled out after the savoy truffle" – refers to the deterioration of one's teeth after eating too many sweets, echoing the warning that Clapton had recently received from his dentist.

Over the second bridge, Harrison adapted Taylor's suggestion to read "You know that what you eat you are". In the same section, a subsequent line names the track "Ob-La-Di, Ob-La-Da", a Paul McCartney composition that would also appear on The Beatles. In this way, "Savoy Truffle" continued a tradition initiated by John Lennon in 1967, particularly in his lyrics to "I Am the Walrus", whereby the Beatles deliberately quoted from their previous songs.

Since "Ob-La-Di, Ob-La-Da" was not a song that McCartney's bandmates enjoyed recording, the motive behind Harrison's appropriation of the title has invited speculation. Author Jeffrey Roessner considers it significant that Harrison mispronounces the title; in addition, he contends that the full statement – "We all know Ob-la-di-bla-da / But can you show me where you are?" – serves as an example of Harrison, like Lennon, mocking those listeners who obsessively scanned the Beatles' lyrics for hidden meaning. Music journalist Robert Fontenot interprets the lines as an expression of distaste for "Ob-La-Di, Ob-La-Da", since Harrison and Lennon were openly critical of McCartney's composition. (Note: Everett comments on the "sinister" implication in "Savoy Truffle" that, contrary to McCartney's refrain in "Ob-La-Di, Ob-La-Da", "life will not go on".)

== Recording ==
The Beatles taped the basic track for "Savoy Truffle" at Trident Studios in London on 3 October 1968, the day after Harrison had recorded his and Clapton's song "Badge" for Cream's forthcoming album. In his NME interview the previous month, Harrison expressed satisfaction with his increased guitar contributions to the Beatles' recent recording sessions; he also said that their album would be a return to the "funky" rock approach that had characterised their pre-fame performances at Liverpool's Cavern club and in Hamburg. (Note: Harrison also enthused about the possibility of producing new recordings by Little Richard and said he was keen for the Beatles and Elvis Presley to collaborate on an album.) With Lennon absent between 3 and 7 October, the line-up on the rhythm track was Harrison on electric guitar, McCartney on bass, and Ringo Starr on drums. Overdubs took place on 5 October, again at Trident, and then on 11 and 14 October, at EMI Studios (now Abbey Road Studios). Chris Thomas, as assistant to the Beatles' producer, George Martin, played electric piano on the song.

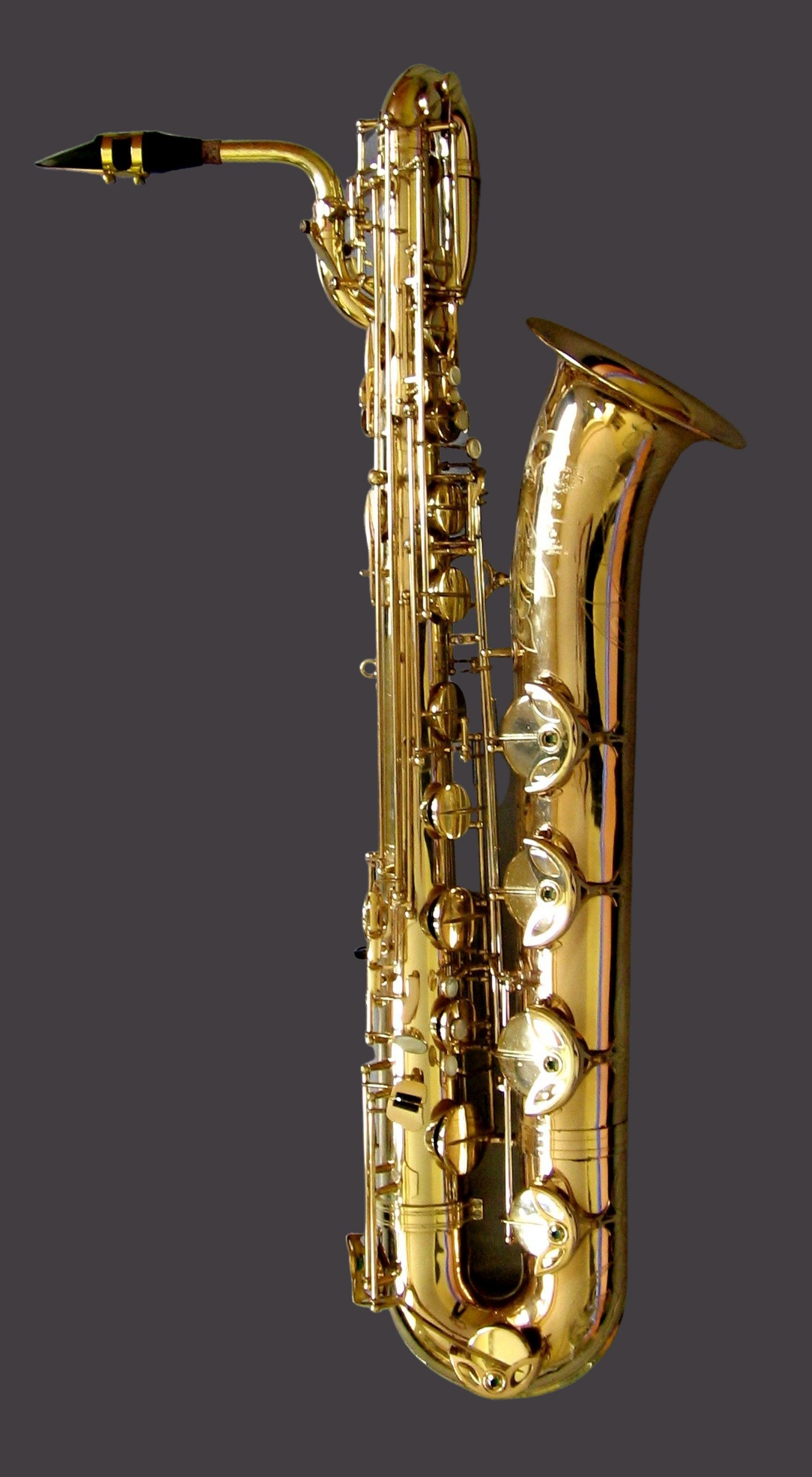
The use of baritone saxophones on "Savoy Truffle" introduced a sound that characterised many of Harrison's recordings as a solo artist.

During the 11 October session, six saxophonists (three baritone and three tenor) performed overdubs, arranged by Thomas. These horn players were all veterans of the British jazz scene and included Art Ellefson and Ronnie Ross. Ken Scott, the Beatles' recording engineer, recalls that Harrison thought the saxophones sounded "too clean ... too nice" and so asked that they be treated with heavy distortion. (Note: According to one of Scott's assistants, before playing back the finished recording to these musicians, Harrison told them: "I've got to apologise for what I've done to your beautiful sound. Please forgive me – but it's the way I want it!") Scott also cites Harrison's curt dismissal of Martin's objections, that the song sounded too "toppy", as evidence of the Beatles' growing independence during the making of the White Album – a project in which Martin played a mainly peripheral role. In author Nicholas Schaffner's description, the song's "beefy horns" became "a trademark" of Harrison's work following the Beatles' break-up in 1970. (Note: Author Simon Leng similarly recognises the song as establishing a precedent for Harrison's solo career. He refers to Harrison's "favorite 'Savoy Truffle' model" when describing Jim Horn's baritone sax-based horn arrangements on songs such as "The Lord Loves the One", "Cloud 9" and "Poor Little Girl".)

When we were mixing it, George Martin walks into the control room and says, "Er, isn't it a bit bright? Isn't it a bit toppy?" And George just turns 'round to him and says: "Yeah, and I like it"... [The Beatles] were like the kids that have just left home and the parents aren't looking after them anymore.

— Ken Scott, 2011

The 14 October date marked the final recording session for The Beatles. With Starr away in Sardinia, the overdubs consisted of another lead guitar part by Harrison, and organ, tambourine and bongos, although the latter contribution does not appear in the final mix. Harrison and Thomas have each been credited as the organ player. According to Everett, there are two organ parts, the second of which provides a "soft, whirling" sound over the more "sustained" part. In his description of the finished recording, Jonathan Gould notes the aptness of Harrison's vocal delivery, where the list of chocolate flavours "roll off George's tongue like a catalog of life's little pleasures". He also comments on the effectiveness of Harrison's guitar solo, which, further to the lyric's warnings regarding tooth decay, is "pitched to the register of a dentist's drill".

Mixing on "Savoy Truffle" was also completed on 14 October, after which Harrison left for Los Angeles to produce Jackie Lomax's album Is This What You Want? The stereo and mono mixes of the song differ in their editing of the lead guitar parts. In addition, the mono version omits the organ over the third verse.

== Release and reception ==
Apple Records released The Beatles on 22 November 1968. "Savoy Truffle" was sequenced as the third track on side four of the double LP, between "Honey Pie" and "Cry Baby Cry". As with Harrison's other three contributions to the album, including "While My Guitar Gently Weeps", the song was viewed by many commentators as a sign of his growing maturity as a songwriter beside Lennon and McCartney.

Due to the Beatles' use of pastiche, parody, irony and, in the case of "Savoy Truffle" and Lennon's "Glass Onion", self-quotation, the album's lyrics were intensely analysed by contemporary reviewers. Alan Walsh of Melody Maker described "Savoy Truffle" as "a rocker that's the most obscure track lyrically". Record Mirror's reviewer speculated that the song "could either be a delicate and expensive sweet or a new dance. It could be a delivery on the pomposities of intricate desserts or a depiction of the 'upper' class." The writer then concluded: "Whatever it is, it swings." Alan Smith of the NME said that although he was "not particularly partial" to the song, "there's a good, heavy sound and I'm not complaining."

In his review for International Times, Barry Miles wrote: "George's 'Savoy Truffle' is the best track on this [LP] side. Beautiful, impressionistic music. Don't miss this one." Jann Wenner of Rolling Stone praised Harrison's lead guitar playing throughout the album and highlighted the song as an example of the Beatles' success in progressing on their past work, in this case by creating "a more sophisticated look at 'Lucy In the Sky With Diamonds'". In Newsweek's mainly unfavourable review, Hubert Saal concluded by saying that Harrison was the album's "hero", as the composer of its two best songs, "Savoy Truffle" and "Long, Long, Long", and that the former "appears to sing the praises of food and in fact is all about suffering".

== Retrospective assessment ==
Given the lack of stylistic unity across its 30 tracks, many authors have since scrutinised the content of The Beatles with regard to whether the album would have benefited from being scaled down to a single disc, an assertion that Martin repeatedly voiced. In his book Revolution in the Head, Ian MacDonald dismisses "Savoy Truffle" as "space-filling" and "as pointless as ['Honey Pie']". In a 2003 review for Mojo magazine, he described it more favourably as "an efficient jeu d'esprit". Author Alan Clayson has questioned its inclusion in light of Harrison having more substantial compositions that went unrecorded by the band, and, in the case of "Not Guilty", a song that the Beatles recorded but then omitted from the White Album. In his attempt to reduce the 1968 release to a single LP, Mark Caro of the Chicago Tribune listed all of Harrison's contributions except for "Savoy Truffle", which he included in his "toughest deletions" category, along with three Lennon-written songs. Writing in the 2004 Rolling Stone Album Guide, Rob Sheffield said that such scrutiny had long been part of the double album's legacy. He described the track as being "among the Beatles' finest songs".

Beatles biographer Philip Norman considers "Savoy Truffle" to be "the album's best piece of rock and roll" after McCartney's "Back in the U.S.S.R." While admiring the interplay between the saxophones and lead guitar as "rousing rock-'n'-roll confectionery", Tim Riley views the song as one of the "essentials" on The Beatles and, with regard to the "sheer feel" of the performance, Harrison's most successful contribution to the band's discography since "I Want to Tell You" in 1966. Former Creem critic Richard Riegel included "Savoy Truffle" on his 1996 list of the ten most underrated Beatles tracks, saying: "this is a great song by any standard, certainly the most fun George would have in the sensual world for many years to come. 'Savoy Truffle' is wonderfully British psychedelic throwaway pop, much like Cream on their pop-tarty Disraeli Gears, recorded back when Eric Clapton was a mortal, too." In the opinion of author Mark Hertsgaard, the song's most salient features are its "beefy horns" and the lyric directed at McCartney. He grouped it with "Glass Onion", "Wild Honey Pie" and "Don't Pass Me By" as examples of how each of the four Beatles were represented on the White Album by tracks that, although short of the band's best work, were "certainly the equal of most other pop songs of the era".

Among more recent reviews, Daryl Easlea of BBC Music cites "Savoy Truffle" as an example of "the doodles that delight" on the White Album, and he describes it as "a fine counterweight" to "While My Guitar Gently Weeps". Mark Kemp, writing for Paste, highlights the same pair of tracks as "two of Harrison's finest moments ('While My Guitar Gently Weeps,' with Eric Clapton wailing on lead guitar, and the surrealistic soul of 'Savoy Truffle')".

"Savoy Truffle" was included on the Beatles' 2012 iTunes compilation Tomorrow Never Knows, which the band's website described as a collection of "the Beatles' most influential rock songs". In 2015, it was ranked 66th in the NME's list "100 Greatest Beatles Songs As Chosen By Music's A-Listers". Staff writer Leonie Cooper admired its subject matter and described the track as a "typically off-kilter" Harrison composition. Coinciding with the 50th anniversary of the White Album's release, Jacob Stolworthy of The Independent listed "Savoy Truffle" at number 7 in his ranking of the album's 30 tracks. He said it was "the album's most criminally overlooked song" as well as "The Beatles at their most underrated".

== Cover versions and remixes ==
Ella Fitzgerald covered "Savoy Truffle" on her 1969 album Ella, produced by Richard Perry. Jayson Greene of Pitchfork cites her "jazzy spin" on the track as an example of how Harrison's songwriting appealed to soul and jazz artists and invited fresh interpretations. In 1970, Terry Manning included the song on his album Home Sweet Home. The recording features Robert Moog on synthesizer and has been described by PopMatters as "long, freaked out" and "sublimely excessive".

Phish included "Savoy Truffle" in their performance of The Beatles on Halloween 1994, which was released in 2002 as Live Phish Volume 13. The song was They Might Be Giants' contribution to the 2003 compilation Songs from the Material World: A Tribute to George Harrison.

They Might Be Giants composed and performed a more calmer, hypnotic rendition of the song for the 2003 multi-artist tribute album Songs from the Material World: A Tribute to George Harrison.

Along with a sample of the Beatles' "Glass Onion", the song was mashed with Jay-Z's "Encore" for a track on Danger Mouse's The Grey Album in 2004, creating what Spin magazine's reviewer termed a "psychedelic Stax jam". For the Beatles' 2006 remix album Love, the track's horn parts were mixed into "Drive My Car". Dhani Harrison performed "Savoy Truffle" at the George Fest tribute concert, held at the Fonda Theatre in Los Angeles on 28 September 2014.

== Personnel ==
According to authors John Winn and Kenneth Womack, except where noted: (Note: Winn states that Thomas was the sole organist, but Womack lists only Harrison; in Everett's estimation, there are two organ parts. The authors similarly disagree on the tambourine credit: whereas Womack lists Starr, Winn writes that the percussion was played by "someone" but "not Ringo, who had already departed for Sardinia".)

The Beatles

- George Harrison – double-tracked vocal, rhythm guitar, lead guitars, Hammond organ, acoustic guitar (fill)
- Paul McCartney – harmony vocal, bass guitar
- Ringo Starr – drums
- uncredited – tambourine

Additional musicians

- Chris Thomas – electric piano, organ, horn arrangement
- Art Ellefson – tenor saxophone
- Danny Moss – tenor saxophone
- Derek Collins – tenor saxophone
- Ronnie Ross – baritone saxophone
- Harry Klein – baritone saxophone
- Bernard George – baritone saxophone

== Sources ==
- Brackett, Nathan; Hoard, Christian, eds. (2004). The New Rolling Stone Album Guide (4th edn). New York, NY: Fireside/Simon & Schuster. ISBN 0-7432-0169-8.
- Castleman, Harry; Podrazik, Walter J. (1976). All Together Now: The First Complete Beatles Discography 1961–1975. New York, NY: Ballantine Books. ISBN 0-345-25680-8.
- Clapton, Eric (2007). Eric Clapton: The Autobiography. London: Century. ISBN 978-1-84605-309-2.
- Clayson, Alan (2003). George Harrison. London: Sanctuary. ISBN 1-86074-489-3.
- Doggett, Peter (2011). You Never Give Me Your Money: The Beatles After the Breakup. New York, NY: It Books. ISBN 978-0-06-177418-8.
- The Editors of Rolling Stone (2002). Harrison. New York, NY: Rolling Stone Press. ISBN 978-0-7432-3581-5.
- Everett, Walter (1999). The Beatles as Musicians: Revolver Through the Anthology. New York, NY: Oxford University Press. ISBN 0-19-512941-5.
- Gould, Jonathan (2007). Can't Buy Me Love: The Beatles, Britain and America. London: Piatkus. ISBN 978-0-7499-2988-6.
- Guesdon, Jean-Michel; Margotin, Philippe (2013). All the Songs: The Story Behind Every Beatles Release. New York, NY: Black Dog & Leventhal. ISBN 978-1-57912-952-1.
- Harrison, George (2002) [1980]. I, Me, Mine. San Francisco, CA: Chronicle Books. ISBN 978-0-8118-5900-4.
- Harry, Bill (2003). The George Harrison Encyclopedia. London: Virgin Books. ISBN 978-0-7535-0822-0.
- Hertsgaard, Mark (1996). A Day in the Life: The Music and Artistry of the Beatles. London: Pan Books. ISBN 0-330-33891-9.
- Ingham, Chris (2006). The Rough Guide to the Beatles (2nd edn). London: Rough Guides/Penguin. ISBN 978-1-84836-525-4.
- Inglis, Ian (2009). "Revolution". In Womack, Kenneth (ed.). The Cambridge Companion to the Beatles. Cambridge, UK: Cambridge University Press. ISBN 978-0-521-68976-2.
- Inglis, Ian (2010). The Words and Music of George Harrison. Santa Barbara, CA: Praeger. ISBN 978-0-313-37532-3.
- Lavezzoli, Peter (2006). The Dawn of Indian Music in the West. New York, NY: Continuum. ISBN 0-8264-2819-3.
- Leng, Simon (2006). While My Guitar Gently Weeps: The Music of George Harrison. Milwaukee, WI: Hal Leonard. ISBN 978-1-4234-0609-9.
- Lewisohn, Mark (2005) [1988]. The Complete Beatles Recording Sessions: The Official Story of the Abbey Road Years 1962–1970. London: Bounty Books. ISBN 978-0-7537-2545-0.
- MacDonald, Ian (1998). Revolution in the Head: The Beatles' Records and the Sixties. London: Pimlico. ISBN 978-0-7126-6697-8.
- Miles, Barry (2001). The Beatles Diary Volume 1: The Beatles Years. London: Omnibus Press. ISBN 0-7119-8308-9.
- Norman, Philip (1996) [1981]. Shout!: The Beatles in Their Generation. New York, NY: Fireside. ISBN 0-684-83067-1.
- Quantick, David (2002). Revolution: The Making of the Beatles' White Album. Chicago, IL: A Cappella Books. ISBN 1-55652-470-6.
- Riley, Tim (2002) [1988]. Tell Me Why – The Beatles: Album by Album, Song by Song, the Sixties and After. Cambridge, MA: Da Capo Press. ISBN 978-0-306-81120-3.
- Roessner, Jeffrey (2006). "We All Want to Change the World: Postmodern Politics and the Beatles' White Album". In Womack, Ken; Davis, Todd (eds.). Reading the Beatles: Cultural Studies, Literary Criticism, and the Fab Four. Albany, NY: SUNY Press. ISBN 0-7914-8196-4.
- Schaffner, Nicholas (1978). The Beatles Forever. New York, NY: McGraw-Hill. ISBN 0-07-055087-5.
- Scorsese, Martin (dir.) (2011). George Harrison: Living in the Material World (2 DVDs). Roadshow Entertainment/Grove Street Productions. R-112294-9.
- Unterberger, Richie (2006). The Unreleased Beatles: Music & Film. San Francisco, CA: Backbeat Books. ISBN 978-0-87930-892-6.
- Winn, John C. (2008). Way Beyond Compare: The Beatles' Recorded Legacy, Volume One, 1962–1965. New York, NY: Three Rivers Press. ISBN 978-0-307-45239-9.
- Winn, John C. (2009). That Magic Feeling: The Beatles' Recorded Legacy, Volume Two, 1966–1970. New York, NY: Three Rivers Press. ISBN 978-0-307-45239-9.
- Womack, Kenneth (2014). The Beatles Encyclopedia: Everything Fab Four. Santa Barbara, CA: ABC-CLIO. ISBN 978-0-313-39171-2.
