= Yeh, Yeh =

1964 single by Georgie Fame and the Blue Flames

Single by Georgie Fame and the Blue Flames
- B-side: "Preach and Teach"
- Released: 4 December 1964
- Recorded: 1964
- Genre: Latin soul
- Length: 2:43
- Label: Columbia
- Songwriters: Rodgers Grant, Pat Patrick, Jon Hendricks
- Producer: Tony Palmer

Georgie Fame and the Blue Flames singles chronology
"I'm In Love With You" (1964)	"Yeh, Yeh" (1964)	"In the Meantime" (1965)

Official audio
- "Yeh, Yeh" on YouTube

"Yeh, Yeh" is a Latin soul song originally written as an instrumental by Rodgers Grant and Pat Patrick, and first recorded by Mongo Santamaría on his album Watermelon Man! in 1963. Lyrics were written for it shortly thereafter by Jon Hendricks of the vocalese group, Lambert, Hendricks & Bavan and this version appeared on their 1963 album At Newport '63.

The vocal version of the song was recorded by Georgie Fame and the Blue Flames (b/w Preach and Teach, Columbia DB 7428) and released on December 4, 1964. UK demonstration records were titled "Yeah, Yeh, Yeh" and this eventually led to some countries: Denmark, Germany, the Netherlands, Switzerland and South Africa releasing the single using "Yeah, Yeh, Yeh" and Greece using the title, "Yeah, Yeh". Furthermore, some UK initial issues were also incorrectly titled as "Yeah, Yeah".

It was this version which rose to the top of the UK Singles Chart in January 1965, breaking the Beatles' five week hold on the number one spot with "I Feel Fine", and a month later appeared on the US Billboard pop singles chart to peak at #21. In Canada it first appeared in February and peaked at #1 March 1, 1965. The saxophone solo was by Peter Coe, but was edited out for the US single release. Interviewed after the 2003 Jools Holland Spring Hootennany, where he had played a "dynamite version" of the song, Fame explained that the arrangement had been written by Tubby Hayes.

== Charts ==
Weekly chart performance for "Yeh Yeh"
Chart (1965)	Peak position
Belgium (Ultratop Wallonia)	19
Canadian Singles Chart (RPM)	1
Irish Singles Chart (IRMA)	3
UK Singles Chart (OCC)	1
US Billboard Hot 100	21

== Matt Bianco version ==
"Yeh Yeh"

Single by Matt Bianco

from the album Matt Bianco
- B-side: "Smooth"
- Released: September 1985
- Genre: Sophisti-pop
- Length: 3:16
- Label: WEA
- Songwriters: Rodgers Grant, Pat Patrick, Jon Hendricks
- Producers: Mark Reilly, Phil Harding

Matt Bianco singles chronology
"More Than I Can Bear" (1985)	"Yeh Yeh" (1985)	"Just Can't Stand It" (1986)

Music video
- "Yeh Yeh" on YouTube

British band Matt Bianco covered the song in 1985. It was their first release after the departure of Danny White and Basia Trzetrzelewska. Their rendition reached number 13 on the UK Singles Chart, and the top 10 in Germany and Switzerland. The single version was then included in their second eponymous album in 1986, while the CD edition of the album only contained its 12" dance mix. Both versions featured on the MC edition of the album, depending upon the various countries.

The song's music video was directed by Pete Cornish.

=== Track listings ===
- 7" single

A. "Yeh Yeh" – 3:16
B. "Smooth" – 4:37

- 12" single

A. "Yeh Yeh" (Dance Mix) – 5:23
B. "Smooth" (Extra Smooth) – 5:26

=== Charts ===
Weekly chart performance for "Yeh Yeh"
Chart (1985–1986)	Peak position
Australia (ARIA)	64
Austria (Ö3 Austria Top 40)	22
Belgium (Ultratop Flanders)	23
France (SNEP)	22
Germany (Media Control Charts)	7
Irish Singles Chart (IRMA)	15
Italy (Musica e dischi)	17
Netherlands (Single Top 100)	27
Switzerland (Swiss Hitparade)	10
UK Singles Chart (OCC)	13

== Other notable versions ==
- Claude François's French cover titled "Alors salut!" was a #4 hit in Belgium in 1965.
