= Half a Minute =

Single by Matt Bianco

from the album Whose Side Are You On?
- B-side: "Matt's Mood II"
- Released: October 1984
- Genre: Sophisti-pop
- Length: 3:46
- Label: WEA
- Songwriter(s): Mark Reilly, Danny White, Kito Poncioni
- Producer(s): Mark Reilly, Danny White

Matt Bianco singles chronology
"Whose Side Are You On?" (1984)	"Half a Minute" (1984)	"More Than I Can Bear" (1985)

Music video
- "Half a Minute" on YouTube

"Half a Minute" is the fourth single by British band Matt Bianco, released in 1984. It was written by band members Mark Reilly, Danny White and Kito Poncioni. The song was included on Matt Bianco's debut album Whose Side Are You On?. It is the only song on the album entirely performed by the vocalist Basia Trzetrzelewska.

"Half a Minute" received favourable reviews in British music magazines No. 1 and Smash Hits. It only charted in the UK and Germany, at no. 23 and 19, respectively, but remains one of the most popular Matt Bianco songs in both countries.

== Music video ==
The accompanying music video was directed by Bob Elsdale. It pictures the band performing the song on a beach, singing and playing various instruments. The clip then cuts through to a black-and-white footage of the band entering a house where they proceed to perform the song in a room. Basia turns the TV on which is showing them their own performance on the beach. The back door then opens through which Mark Reilly runs out.

== Track listings ==
- 7" single

A. "Half a Minute" – 3:46
B. "Matt's Mood II" – 3:40

- 12" single

A. "Half a Minute" (Extended Version) – 4:44
B. "Matt's Mood II" (Extended Version) – 5:13

== Charts ==
Weekly chart performance for "Half a Minute"
Chart (1984–85)	Peak position
Germany (Media Control Charts)	19
UK Singles Chart (OCC)	23

== Other versions ==
- Erwin Lehn recorded a cover of the song in 1986.
- After departing from Matt Bianco, Basia has included "Half a Minute" in her solo live repertoire. A live version was included on her concert album Basia on Broadway and released as a single in 1995.
