= Get Out of Your Lazy Bed =

Single by Matt Bianco

from the album Whose Side Are You On?
- B-side: "Big Rosie"
- Released: January 1984
- Genre: Sophisti-pop
- Length: 3:22
- Label: WEA
- Songwriters: Mark Reilly, Danny White
- Producer: Peter Collins

Matt Bianco singles chronology
"Get Out of Your Lazy Bed" (1984)	"Sneaking Out the Back Door" (1984)

Music video
- "Get Out of Your Lazy Bed" on YouTube

"Get Out of Your Lazy Bed" is the debut single by British band Matt Bianco, released in 1984. It was written by band members Mark Reilly and Danny White.

The song became the band's first top 20 hit, peaking at no. 15 on the UK Singles Chart. It also entered the top 20 in Sweden and Switzerland, top 10 in Ireland, and climbed as high as no. 2 in Norway. The track was included on Matt Bianco's debut album Whose Side Are You On?.

"Get Out of Your Lazy Bed" was used as the theme tune by long running New Zealand children's breakfast show What Now.

== Music video ==
The song's music video pictures the band performing on a black and white chequered floor. It was directed by Pete Cornish.

== Track listings ==
- 7" single

A. "Get Out of Your Lazy Bed" – 3:22
B. "Big Rosie" – 3:26

- 12" single

A. "Get Out of Your Lazy Bed" (Extended Version) – 4:25
B. "Big Rosie" (Extended Version) – 6:20

== Charts ==
Weekly chart performance for "Get Out of Your Lazy Bed"
Chart (1984)	Peak position
Belgium (Ultratop Flanders)	14
Germany (Media Control Charts)	31
Irish Singles Chart (IRMA)	8
Netherlands (Single Top 100)	25
Norway (VG-lista)	2
Sweden (Sverigetopplistan)	12
Switzerland (Swiss Hitparade)	14
UK Singles Chart (OCC)	15
