= Sneaking Out the Back Door =

Single by Matt Bianco

from the album Whose Side Are You On?
- B-side: "Matt's Mood"
- Released: 6 April 1984
- Genre: Sophisti-pop
- Length: 3:42
- Label: WEA
- Songwriters: Mark Reilly, Danny White
- Producer: Peter Collins

Matt Bianco singles chronology
"Get Out of Your Lazy Bed" (1984)	"Sneaking Out the Back Door" (1984)	"Whose Side Are You On?" (1984)

Music video
- "Sneaking Out the Back Door" on YouTube

"Sneaking Out the Back Door" is the second single by British band Matt Bianco, released in 1984. It was written by band members Mark Reilly and Danny White. The song was later included on Matt Bianco's debut album Whose Side Are You On?.

== Music video ==
The accompanying music video was shot in Rome and directed by Tony van den Ende.

== Track listings ==
- 7" single

A. "Sneaking Out the Back Door" – 3:42
B. "Matt's Mood" – 4:31

- 12" single

A. "Sneaking Out the Back Door" (Extended Version) – 4:49
B. "Matt's Mood" (Extended Version) – 5:28

== Charts ==
Weekly chart performance for "Sneaking Out the Back Door"
Chart (1984)	Peak position
Irish Singles Chart (IRMA)	22
Italy (Musica e dischi)	15
UK Singles Chart (OCC)	44
