= More Than I Can Bear =

Single by Matt Bianco

from the album Whose Side Are You On?
- B-side: "Matt's Mood"; "Big Rosie"
- Released: 22 February 1985
- Genre: Sophisti-pop
- Length: 4:40
- Label: WEA
- Songwriter(s): Mark Reilly; Danny White
- Producer(s): Mark Reilly; Danny White

Matt Bianco singles chronology
"Half a Minute" (1984)	"More Than I Can Bear" (1985)	"Yeh Yeh" (1985)

Music video
- "More Than I Can Bear" on YouTube

"More Than I Can Bear" is a song by British band Matt Bianco from their debut album Whose Side Are You On? (1984). It served as the album's fifth and final single in 1985. It was written by band members Mark Reilly and Danny White.

The song received a favourable review in Record Mirror and a mixed review in Music Week.

== Music video ==
The accompanying music video was directed by Pete Cornish. It pictures the band performing the song dressed in the interwar period clothing.

== Track listings ==
- 7" single

A. "More Than I Can Bear" (Remix) – 4:40
B. "Matt's Mood" (Remix) – 4:14

- 12" single

A. "More Than I Can Bear" (Remix) – 4:40
B1. "Big Rosie" (Remix) – 4:54
B2. "Matt's Mood" (Remix) – 5:23

- US 7" single

A. "More Than I Can Bear" (Remix) – 3:55
B. "Matt's Mood" (Remix) – 4:55

- US 7" single (1986)

A. "More Than I Can Bear" (Re-Recorded Version) – 4:20
B. "Summer Song" – 5:33

== Charts ==
Weekly chart performance for "More Than I Can Bear"
Chart (1985)	Peak position
France (SNEP)	8
Germany (Media Control Charts)	20
Italy (Musica e dischi)	25
Netherlands (Single Top 100)	18
UK Singles Chart (OCC)	50
