= Art Ellefson =

Canadian jazz saxophonist

- Birth name: Arthur Albert Ellefson
- Born: 17 April 1932; Moose Jaw, Saskatchewan, Canada
- Died: 2018 (aged 85–86)
- Genres: Jazz
- Occupation: Musician
- Instrument: Saxophone
- Years active: 1950s–1990s

Arthur Albert Ellefson (17 April 1932 – 2018) was a Canadian jazz saxophonist who worked in the UK during the 1950s and 1960s.

== Biography ==
Having learned trumpet and euphonium as a boy, he began playing tenor saxophone at 16 and began his career with Bobby Gimby in Toronto. In 1952, he moved to London where he worked with Carl Barriteau, Allan Ganley, Harry Hayes, Ted Heath, Vic Lewis, and Ronnie Ross. In April 1959, he toured with Woody Herman's Anglo-American Herd and with Maynard Ferguson. By the early 1960s, he had toured in the US with Vic Lewis and joined the Johnny Dankworth Orchestra. There was a period of freelance work (including, in October 1968 playing on the track "Savoy Truffle" by The Beatles), before Ellefson left the UK to live in Bermuda and then returned to Canada in 1974. There he played tenor saxophone with Nimmons 'N' Nine Plus Six for the next three years. In February 1976, he recorded with the Kenny Wheeler Quintet in Toronto. In the 1980s, he released two albums under his own name: The Art Ellefson Trio (1981) and The Art Ellefson Quartet featuring Tommy Flanagan. In 1988, he taught at Malaspina College. His quartet included Gary Williamson, Ian McDougall, and Dave Piltch. In 1992, the album As if to Say, credited to Art Ellefson & Jazz Modus, was released on the Sackville label.

According to music writer Jack Batten "his sound seems a direct extension of the old masters... [Coleman] Hawkins and [Ben] Webster and Lucky Thompson, and so is his sing-song lyricism, but the drive and naked passion of his playing comes from later, more beboppy tenor men'.

== Discography ==
=== As leader ===
- 1981 The Art Ellefson Trio
- 1985 The Art Ellefson Quartet featuring Tommy Flanagan
- 1992 As If to Say (Sackville)

=== As sideman ===
- 1959 The Swinging Sounds of the Jazzmakers, Ronnie Ross
- 1968 Third Face of Fame, Georgie Fame
- 1976 1976, Kenny Wheeler
- 1997 Atlantic Suite/Suite P.E.I./Tributes, Phil Nimmons
- 1998 Ridin' High: The British Sessions 1960–1971, Cleo Laine

== Bibliography ==
- Bavin, Pam. "Canadians in London 2". Art Ellefson, Coda, vol. 4, Nov 1961
- Brown, Don. Liner notes for The Art Ellefson Quartet, Unisson DDA-005
