= Guitar pedalboard =

Flat board or panel for the electric guitar

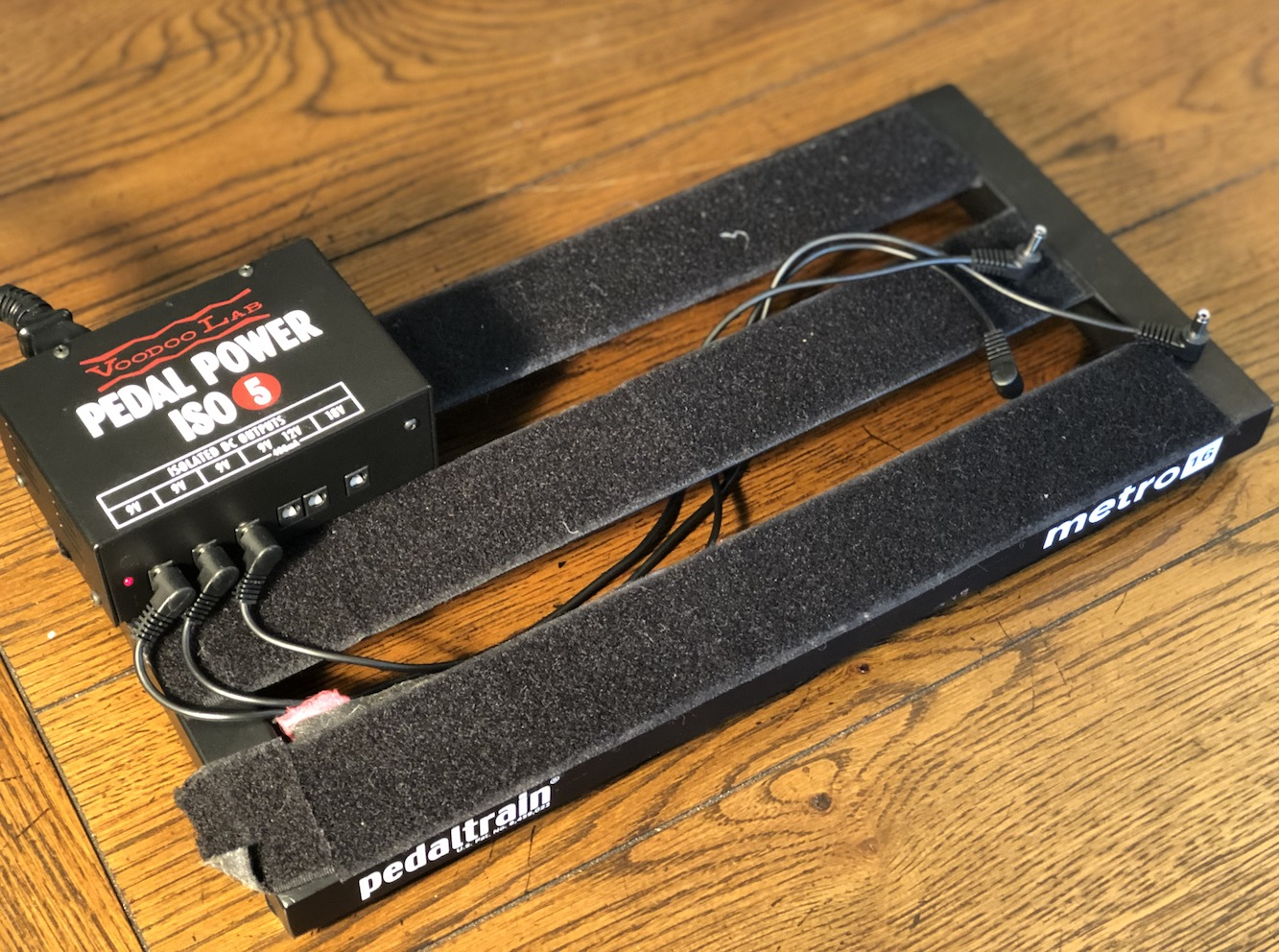

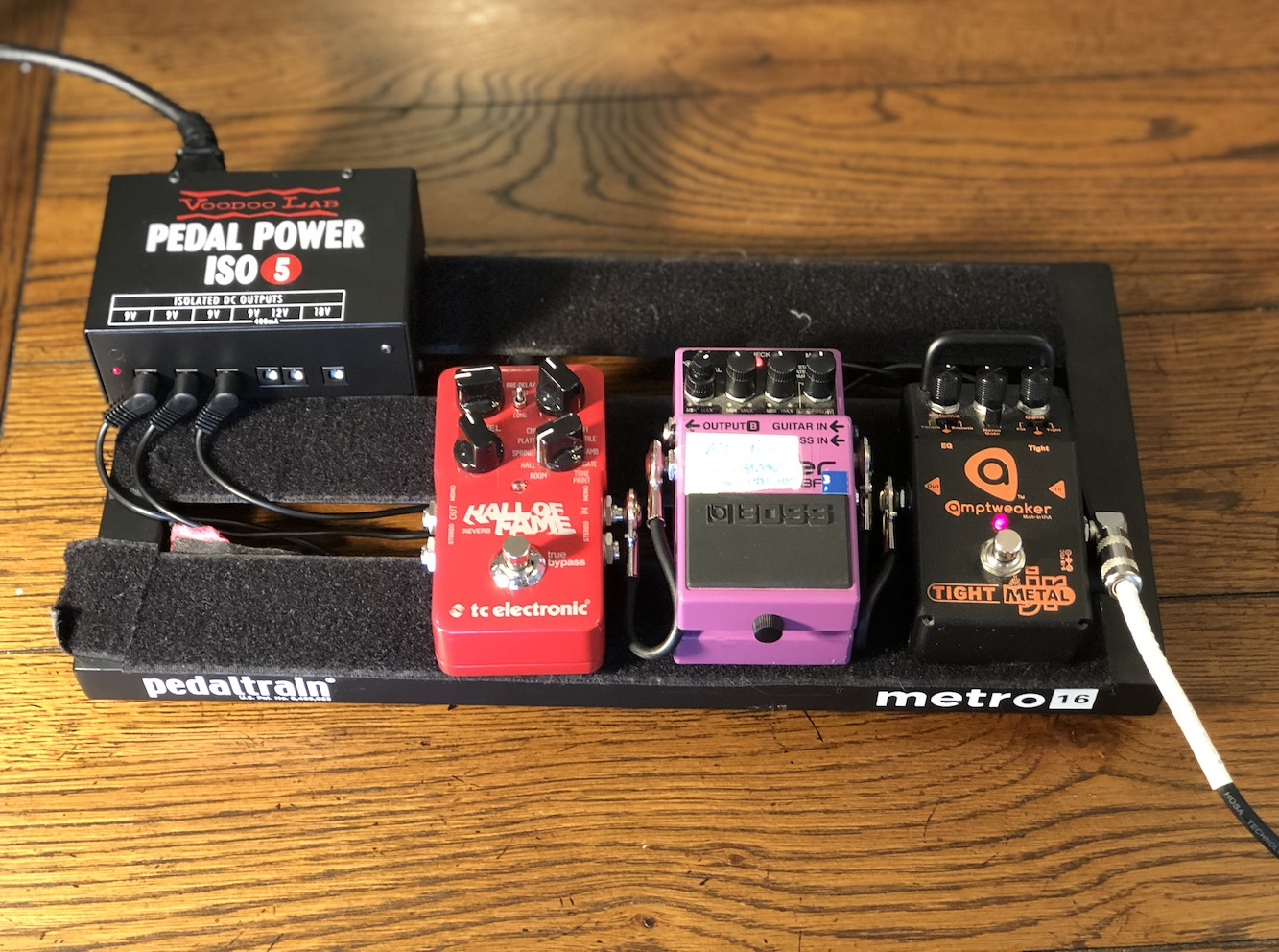
A pedalboard and external power supply, with and without pedals.

A guitar pedalboard is a platform or container used to manage a collection of effects pedals for the electric guitar and bass. Depending on the model, pedalboards often have integrated power supplies with connection cables, use multiple tiers, and can act as patch bays to simplify switching between multiple pedals. Pedalboards can be store-bought or made by a player. Most have flat or angled surfaces where pedals and external power supplies attach using hook-and-loop fasteners or other techniques, and often have a removable lid when part of an integrated case to enable easier transportation.

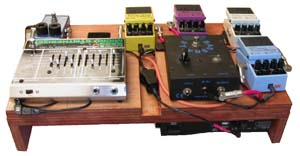
A custom-made wooden pedalboard shows the "audience" view of a pedalboard, with the pedals arrayed towards the bassist.

Pete Cornish has been described as "the inventor of the guitar pedalboard", having pioneered their use in the 1970s when effects pedal offerings had greatly expanded and live rigs were becoming increasingly complicated.

== See also ==
- Guitar amplifier
