= Rodgers Grant =

American jazz musician (1936–2012)

Rodgers Lee Grant (January 18, 1936 – April 12, 2012) was an American jazz pianist, composer, and lyricist. After working with saxophonist Hugo Dickens in the 1950s, he became pianist for Mongo Santamaría in the 1960s. In 1963, Grant wrote the hit "Yeh! Yeh!" with Pat Patrick. Jon Hendricks wrote lyrics for the song and recorded it with Lambert and Bavan at the Newport Jazz Festival of 1963. Georgie Fame and the Blue Flames had a hit with the song in 1965.

Trombonist Scott Whitfield recorded two of Grant's compositions on Scott Whitfield Jazz Orchestra East – Live at Birdland (2004).

Grant served in the United States Army.

Grant moved to Paulding, Ohio in 2006 and died on April 12, 2012, at the age of 76 in Defiance, Ohio after suffered several types of cancer.

== Discography ==
Grant performed sidework as a pianist for Mongo Santamaria, George Benson, Hubert Laws, Esther Phillips and Willie Colón.
