= New Cool Collective =

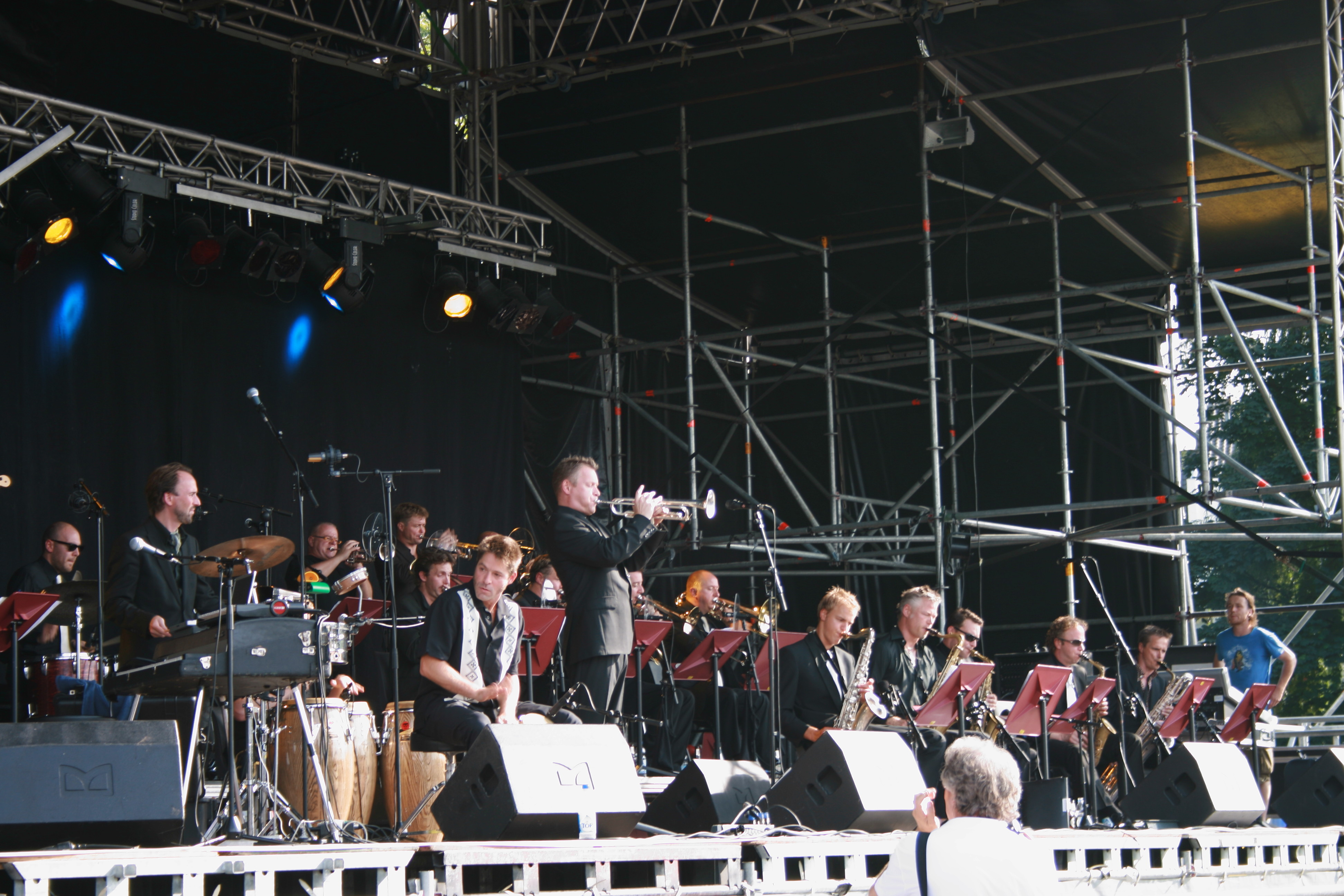
- New Cool Collective Bigband at Sittard, Netherlands in 2008

Background information
- Origin: Netherlands
- Genres: Jazz, big band
- Years active: 1993–present
- Website: www.newcoolcollective.com

New Cool Collective is a Dutch musical ensemble founded in 1993, core members are Benjamin Herman (sax), Joost Kroon (drums), Frank van Dok (percussion), Willem Friede (keyboard / arranger), Jos de Haas (percussion), Leslie Lopez (bass) and David Rockefeller (trumpet).

They also perform in a 19-piece big band line-up; the New Cool Collective Big Band consists of two alto saxophones, two tenor saxophones, one baritone saxophone, four trumpets, three trombones, one bass trombone, guitar, Fender Rhodes, percussion, congas, drums and vocals.

In 2000 they won the Edison Jazz Award, the most prestigious music award of the Netherlands. In 2013 the band won a Golden Calf award on the Dutch Film Festival for the music they made for the Dutch movie Toegetakeld door de liefde, in which they also have a cameo as a fictional band. The music of that movie is recorded on their album Chin Chin.

Following Guus Meeuwis Groots Met Een Zachte G 2013 concert where New Cool Collective performed with Guus, they went on to collaborate on 2014's Hollandse Meesters (cover-versions of Dutch evergreens). New Cool Collective and Guus Meeuwis performed a one-off concert at the Rijksmuseum on October 17, 2014 to celebrate the new album. They also collaborated with Mark Reilly from Matt Bianco on 2015's The Things You Love-EP. Both were followed with parts 1 and 2 of Electric Monkey Sessions.

In 2018 the band received another Edison Award for their album New Cool Collective Big Band ft. Thierno Koité, featuring Senegalese saxophone player Thierno Koité from Orchestra Baobab.

== Discography ==
Albums
Year	Title	Artist
1997	Soul Jazz Latin Flavours Nineties Vibe	
1998	More Soul Jazz Latin Flavours Nineties Vibes	
1999	Big	
2002	Bring It On	featuring Geike Arnaert, Andrew Roachford
2005	TRIPPIN’	featuring Tony Allen
2007	LIVE	
2008	Out of Office	featuring Matt Bianco, Lilian Vieira
2009	Live in Luxor (DVD)	featuring Jules Deelder, Ger Sax
2009	Sugar Protocol	featuring Los Papines, Mapacha Africa
2010	Pachinko	
2010	In Concert	
2010	Chocolade	featuring Typhoon
2011	Eighteen	
2013	Chin Chin	
2014	Hollandse Meesters	featuring Guus Meeuwis
2014	Electric Monkey Sessions	
2015	The Things You Love	featuring Matt Bianco (Mark Reilly)
2016	New Cool Collective Big Band featuring Thierno Koite	featuring Thierno Koite
2017	Electric Monkey Sessions 2	
2018	XXV	
2019	Dansé Dansé	
2020	Trippin’ Redux	featuring Tony Allen
2020	High Anxiety feat Matt Bianco	featuring Matt Bianco
2021	YUNIKōN	
2022	Trippin’ (Reissue)	featuring Tony Allen
2024	Everything Is OK	
