= Spike Heatley =

British jazz double bassist (1933–2021)

- Born: Brian John Heatley; 17 February 1933; Muswell Hill, London, England
- Died: 10 November 2021 (aged 88) Dinan, Brittany, France
- Genres: Jazz
- Occupation: Musician
- Instrument: Double bass
- Years active: 1958–2021

Brian John Heatley (17 February 1933 – 10 November 2021), better known as Spike Heatley, was a British jazz double bassist.

== Early life ==
Heatley was born in Muswell Hill, North London in February 1933.

== Career ==
He appeared with Vic Ash's sextet in 1958, together with Ian Hamer (trumpet), Johnny Scott (flugelhorn), and Alan Branscombe (piano) and had then joined The Jazz Couriers some weeks before they disbanded.

He played briefly with the quartet Tubby Hayes formed immediately afterwards with fellow Couriers Terry Shannon and Phil Seamen. Heatley then joined pianist Eddie Thompson's house trio for the opening year at the original Ronnie Scott's in Gerrard Street, while also playing with John Dankworth.

Heatley stayed with Dankworth until 1962, then joined the Tony Coe Quintet, and toured with trumpeter Kenny Baker. In 1963, he was with the Bill Le Sage and Ronnie Ross quartet, with Allan Ganley. He then began session work in the same rhythm section as Jimmy Page and John McLaughlin. He was an early member of Alexis Korner's Blues Incorporated. Between 1970 and 1974, he was part of the jazz-rock fusion act CCS (Collective Consciousness Society) Band, and played on recording sessions for Rod Stewart. In the 1970s, he was in the house band for the children's TV show Play Away.

During the 1980s and early 90s, he was with the American all-star group the Great Guitars featuring Herb Ellis, Charlie Byrd and Barney Kessel which also sometimes featured British player, Martin Taylor. He played in Kessel's trio with Malcolm Mortimore, with whom he later joined Canadian pianist, Oliver Jones.

== Later life and death ==
Heatley died in Dinan, France on 10 November 2021, at the age of 88. He was survived by his wife, Stevie, as well as his son and two daughters.

== Discography ==
- Presenting The Bill Le Sage - Ronnie Ross Quartet (April 1963) - Bill Le Sage (piano, vibes); Ronnie Ross (baritone sax); Heatley (bass); Allan Ganley (drums)
- 2003:The Other Side of the Coin (Renella Records) - Spike Heatley, (double bass); Roy Williams, (trombone); Danny Moss (tenor saxophone); Mick Hanson (guitar); Dave Newton (piano); Malcolm Mortimore (drums)
- One for Clifford and another one for Tubby (Renella Records) - Spike Heatley (bass); Alan Barnes (saxes); John Horler (piano); Malcolm Mortimore (drums)
- Zurich Express (Renella Records) - Spike Heatley (leader/bass); Jim Lawless (vibraphone); Andy Williams (guitar); Malcolm Mortimore (drums)
