= Whose Side Are You On? =

Studio album by Matt Bianco
- Released: 10 August 1984
- Recorded: 1983–1984
- Genres: Sophisti-pop; jazz-pop
- Length: 40:58 (LP); 41:02 (CD); 55:04 (MC)
- Label: WEA
- Producers: Danny White; Mark Reilly; Peter Collins

Matt Bianco chronology
Whose Side Are You On? (1984)	Matt Bianco (1986)

Professional ratings
Review scores
Source	Rating
AllMusic	4.5/5 stars
God Is in the TV	Mixed
No. 1	2/5 stars
Smash Hits	5.5/10

Whose Side Are You On? is the debut studio album by British band Matt Bianco, released in 1984 by WEA. For this album, Matt Bianco was a trio of Mark Reilly (vocals), Basia Trzetrzelewska (vocals), and Danny White (keyboards).

The album contains the band's first five international hits, most notably "Get Out of Your Lazy Bed", "Half a Minute", and the title track.

== Overview ==
The original vinyl record featured 10 tracks. The cassette edition had 12 tracks, adding two bonus tracks: the 12" version of "Big Rosie" (B-side of the band's debut single "Get Out of Your Lazy Bed") and "The Other Side", the instrumental B-side of the single "Whose Side Are You On?". Additionally, the versions of "More Than I Can Bear", "Half a Minute", "Matt's Mood", "Get Out of Your Lazy Bed" and "Sneaking Out the Back Door" on the cassette are different from the versions heard on the vinyl/CD edition. The CD edition was released slightly later, and was one of the earliest pop music compact discs to be released in the music industry.

Whose Side Are You On? achieved a considerable international success, peaking at no. 1 in Austria, where it was the second best-selling album of 1985, behind Tina Turner's Private Dancer. Furthermore, it reached the top 10 in Germany, the Netherlands and Norway. In the UK, the album charted within the top 40 and was awarded gold certification. All of its five singles charted in the top 30 in at least one European country.

== Track listings ==
=== LP/CD ===
All tracks written by Reilly/White except "Whose Side Are You On?" by Reilly/White/Ross, and "Half a Minute" by Reilly/White/Poncioni.

1. "Whose Side Are You On?" (Extended Version) – 4:32
2. "More Than I Can Bear" – 4:15
3. "No No Never" – 3:43
4. "Half a Minute" – 3:49
5. "Matt's Mood" – 5:19
6. "Get Out of Your Lazy Bed" – 3:28
7. "It's Getting Late" – 3:20
8. "Sneaking Out the Back Door" – 3:46
9. "Riding with the Wind" – 3:22
10. "Matt's Mood II" – 5:15

=== MC ===
All tracks written by Reilly/White except "Whose Side Are You On?" by Reilly/White/Ross; "Half a Minute" and "Big Rosie" by Reilly/White/Poncioni.

1. "Whose Side Are You On?" (Extended Version) – 4:32
2. "More Than I Can Bear" – 4:44
3. "No No Never" – 3:43
4. "Half a Minute" (Extended Version) – 4:49
5. "Matt's Mood" – 5:29
6. "Big Rosie" (Extended Version) – 6:07
7. "Get Out of Your Lazy Bed" (Extended Version) – 4:30
8. "It's Getting Late" – 3:20
9. "Sneaking Out the Back Door" (Extended Version) – 4:46
10. "Riding with the Wind" – 3:22
11. "Matt's Mood II" – 5:15
12. "The Other Side" – 4:14

=== 2016 expanded deluxe CD edition ===
Disc One

1. "Whose Side Are You On?" (Extended Version) – 4:35
2. "More Than I Can Bear" (Remix) – 4:42
3. "No No Never" – 3:44
4. "Half a Minute" – 3:50
5. "Matt's Mood" (12" Remix) – 5:26
6. "Get Out of Your Lazy Bed" – 3:27
7. "It's Getting Late" – 3:24
8. "Sneaking Out the Back Door" – 3:47
9. "Riding with the Wind" – 3:24
10. "Matt's Mood II" – 5:16
11. "More Than I Can Bear" (Original UK Album Version) – 4:14
12. "Matt's Mood" (Original UK Album Version) – 5:19
13. "Big Rosie" (7" Version) – 3:29
14. "Whose Side Are You On?" (7" Version) – 3:45
15. "The Other Side" – 4:16
16. "More Than I Can Bear" (US Edited Remix) – 3:57
17. "Whose Side Are You On?" (US 7" Version) – 3:25

Disc Two

1. "Get Out of Your Lazy Bed" (Extended Version) – 4:34
2. "Matt's Mood" (Single Edit) – 4:36
3. "Big Rosie" (Extended Version) – 6:10
4. "Matt's Mood II" (Single Edit) – 3:41
5. "Sneaking Out the Back Door" (Extended Version) – 4:48
6. "More Than I Can Bear" (7" Remix) – 4:18
7. "Big Rosie" (Remix) – 4:55
8. "Half a Minute" (Extended Version) – 4:46
9. "Matt's Mood II" (Extended Version) – 5:31
10. "Whose Side Are You On?" (Demo) – 4:07
11. "Half a Minute" (Demo) – 3:33
12. "Get Out of Your Lazy Bed" (Demo) – 3:53
13. "Sneaking Out the Back Door" (Demo) – 3:42
14. "Big Rosie" (Demo) – 3:42
15. "The Happy Christmas Song" (Demo) – 2:46
16. "Half a Minute" (2016) – 3:49

== Personnel ==
=== Band ===
- Mark Reilly – vocals and production
- Basia Trzetrzelewska – vocals and arrangement of vocal harmonies
- Danny White – keyboards and production

=== Production ===
- Peter Collins for Loose End Productions – production on "Big Rosie"
- Phil Harding – sound engineer on all tracks except "Matt's Mood", "Get Out of Your Lazy Bed" and "Sneaking Out the Back Door", and mixing on all tracks except "Matt's Mood"
- John Buckley – sound engineer on "Matt's Mood", "Get Out of Your Lazy Bed" and "Sneaking Out the Back Door", mixing on "Matt's Mood"

=== Musicians ===
- Robin Jones – percussion on all tracks except "Get Out of Your Lazy Bed" and "Sneaking Out the Back Door"
- Ronnie Ross – baritone sax on "No No Never", "Half a Minute", "Matt's Mood", "Get Out of Your Lazy Bed", "Matt's Mood II" and "The Other Side"
- Peter White – acoustic guitar on "Half a Minute"
- Charles Morgan – drums on "Whose Side Are You On?"
- Guy Barker – flugelhorn on "More Than I Can Bear"
- Chris Dean – trombone on "It's Getting Late"
- Luke Tanny – trumpet on "Sneaking Out the Back Door"
- Peter Ross – drums and percussion on "Big Rosie", "Get Out of Your Lazy Bed" and "Sneaking Out the Back Door"
- Ray Warleigh – flute on "Big Rosie"
- Kito Poncioni – music on "Big Rosie"

=== Staff ===
- Jallé Bakke – hair and make up
- Monica Curtin – photography
- Simon Pickford – graphics
- Trina Baer – clothes
- Peter White, Brian Carr, Richard Evans, Oliver "The Lizard" Smallman, and WEA – special thanks and collaboration

== Charts and certifications ==
=== Weekly charts ===
Chart (1984–85)	Peak position
Australia (Kent Music Report)	38
Austrian Albums (Ö3 Austria)	1
Canada Top Albums/CDs (RPM)	73
Dutch Albums (Album Top 100)	7
German Albums (Offizielle Top 100)	3
Italian Albums (Musica e dischi)	16
New Zealand Albums (RMNZ)	33
Norwegian Albums (VG-lista)	10
Swedish Albums (Sverigetopplistan)	39
Swiss Albums (Schweizer Hitparade)	12
UK Albums (Official Charts)	35

=== Year-end charts ===
Chart (1984)	Peak position
Netherlands (MegaCharts)	78

Chart (1985)	Peak position
Austria (Ö3 Austria)	2
Germany (Media Control)	5
Netherlands (MegaCharts)	15

== Certifications ==
Certifications for Whose Side Are You On?
Region	Certification	Certified units/sales
United Kingdom (BPI)	Gold	100,000^{^}
^{^} Shipments figures based on certification alone.
