= Whose Side Are You On? (song) =

Single by Matt Bianco

from the album Whose Side Are You On?
- B-side: "The Other Side"; "Matt's Mood II"
- Released: 13 July 1984
- Genre: Sophisti-pop
- Length: 3:42
- Label: WEA
- Songwriters: Mark Reilly, Danny White
- Producer: Peter Collins

Matt Bianco singles chronology
| "Sneaking Out the Back Door" (1984) | "Whose Side Are You On?" (1984) | "Half a Minute" (1984) |

Music video
- "Whose Side Are You On?" on YouTube

"Whose Side Are You On?" is the third single by British band Matt Bianco, released in 1984. It was written by band members Mark Reilly and Danny White, and produced by Peter Collins. The song was included on Matt Bianco's first album Whose Side Are You On?

The accompanying music video was directed by Danny Kleinman.

== Track listings ==
- 7" single

A. "Whose Side Are You On?" – 3:42
B. "The Other Side" – 4:11

- 12" single

A. "Whose Side Are You On?" (Extended Version) – 4:32
B. "The Other Side" – 4:12

- 7" US single

A. "Whose Side Are You On?" – 3:22
B. "Matt's Mood II" – 4:13

== Charts ==
Weekly chart performance for "Whose Side Are You On?"
| Chart (1984–85) | Peak position |
|---|---|
| Australia (ARIA) | 57 |
| Canada (RPM) | 70 |
| Netherlands (Single Top 100) | 22 |
| UK Singles Chart (OCC) | 83 |
