= Pete Cornish =

British designer of electric guitar effects

Pete Cornish is a British designer of electric guitar effects and other electronic musical instruments. He is mainly noted for his elaborate fully custom guitar pedalboard systems. He has worked for Paul McCartney, Pink Floyd's David Gilmour, The Who's Pete Townshend, Lou Reed, Tony Iommi, Queen's Brian May, Mark Knopfler (as well directing some Dire Straits and Rick Astley videos), The Police's Andy Summers, and many others.

Cornish has been described as "the inventor of the pedalboard" and a key figure in the transition from single effects to the development of multi-effects units.

== History ==
Pete's basic training was in workshop technology and here he learned to torture-test equipment to determine its suitability for field use.
