= Matt Bianco =

British band formed in 1983

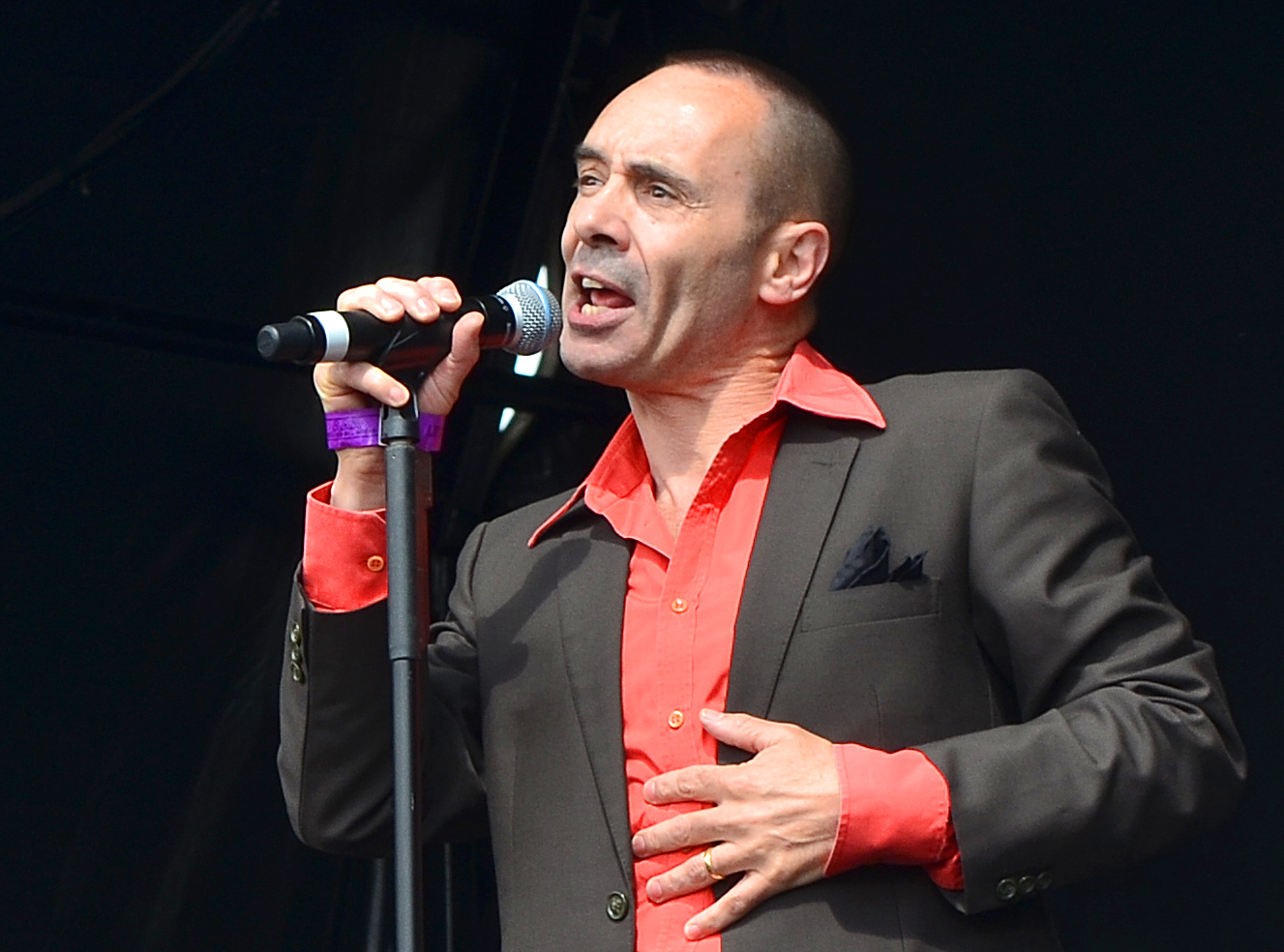
- Mark Reilly of Matt Bianco performing in June 2014

Background information
- Origin: United Kingdom
- Genres: Sophisti-pop; jazz-funk; Latin pop
- Years active: 1983–present
- Labels: WEA; Atlantic; East West; Victor; ZYX Music; Intercord; EmArcy; earMUSIC
- Members: Mark Reilly
- Past members: Mark Fisher; Danny White; Basia Trzetrzelewska; Kito Poncioni; Jenni Evans
- Website: mattbianco.com

Matt Bianco are a British band formed in 1983, performing sophisti-pop, jazz-funk and Latin-flavoured music. From around mid- to late-80s, the group scored a number of internationally charting singles, including "Get Out of Your Lazy Bed", "Whose Side Are You On?", "Half a Minute", "Yeh Yeh" and "Don't Blame It on That Girl".

The group's name suggests that Matt Bianco is a person, often assumed to be an alias for the main member and front man Mark Reilly. According to the group, however, Matt is in fact "a made up spy, a secret agent; we loved spy TV themes and film scores; we were really into that 60s spy movie image". Initially, the line-up included Danny White and Basia Trzetrzelewska, who left the band to focus on Basia's solo career, but rejoined Matt Bianco briefly in the mid-2000s.

== History ==
=== Early years ===
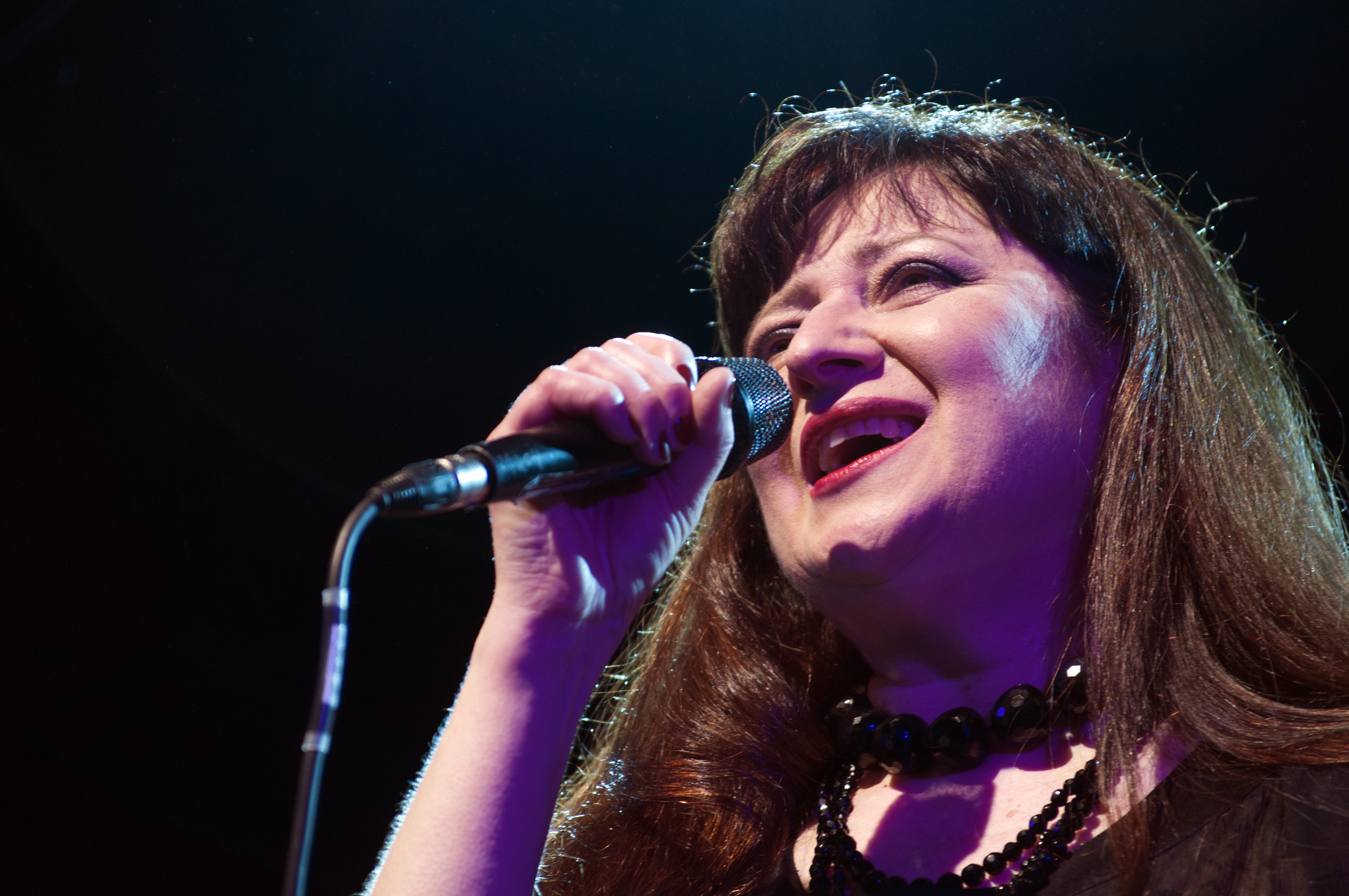
The band featured Polish singer-songwriter Basia as a co-vocalist from 1983 to 1985 and again from 2003 to 2005.

Matt Bianco was formed in 1983 by Mark Reilly (vocals), Danny White (keyboard), Kito Poncioni (bass) – all of whom had just left art pop group Blue Rondo à la Turk – and Polish vocalist Basia Trzetrzelewska. Basia had performed in a short-lived band called Bronze alongside White, having answered their ad placed in Melody Maker.

The group was pictured as a quartet for their first single "Get Out of Your Lazy Bed", although Poncioni only played on the non-album B-side "Big Rosie". He dropped out of the group entirely before the recording of their first album Whose Side Are You On?, released through WEA in August 1984, although he received a co-writing credit on the track "Half a Minute". The album spawned five UK and European hits, including "Get Out of Your Lazy Bed", "Half a Minute", "Sneaking Out the Back Door", "More Than I Can Bear" and the title track. It made the top 3 in Germany and number 1 in Austria. In the UK, it reached the top 40 and would earn a gold certification. Despite the success, Trzetrzelewska and White left the group in 1985 so that Trzetrzelewska could pursue an international solo career under the mononym Basia.

=== Reilly-Fisher duo years ===
Following Danny and Basia's departure, Jenni Evans joined the band as the new female singer, and Mark Fisher became songwriter, producer, and keyboard player. This line-up recorded a self-titled album, which was released in 1986. It spawned the hit "Yeh Yeh", a cover of Georgie Fame's song, which reached number 13 on the UK Singles Chart and number 7 in Germany, and the moderately successful second single "Just Can't Stand It".

The band's sound changed considerably with the addition of Fisher, who contributed a more contemporary sound, compared to that of the early Matt Bianco.

Matt Bianco was now a household name in Europe, and Warner Brothers sought to market them in the United States. They hired Gloria Estefan's husband and producer Emilio Estefan to produce a few songs, and recorded their third album, Indigo, with the Estefan productions being chosen as singles. 1988's "Don't Blame It on That Girl" and "Good Times" only made a moderate impact. However, "Wap Bam Boogie", an album track originally on the B-side of the first single (and which did not involve Estefan in any capacity), did well on the dance charts. This pushed the joint single release of "Don't Blame It on That Girl"/"Wap Bam Boogie" up to number 11 on the UK Singles Chart, making it Matt Bianco's most successful single in that territory. It was also a top 10 dance hit in the US.

The band's fourth studio album, Samba in Your Casa, was released in 1991 by Warner Brothers. It was not a commercial success, though one of its singles, a cover of "What a Fool Believes" (originally by Kenny Loggins and popularised by The Doobie Brothers), reached number 23 in Ireland. Reilly and Fisher split from their record company and started recording albums in their own studios. They scored contracts with ZYX Music and Intercord in Europe, and Victor Entertainment in Asia, but failed to sign on with another major label. Their fifth album, Another Time Another Place, was first released only in Japan in 1993, and in other countries the following year.

Their 1997 album World Go Round reached number 23 in Japan, and the lead single "Sunshine Day" was a moderate dance hit in the US. In 1998, the band released A/Collection exclusively in Japan – a compilation featuring a number of remakes of their stand-out album tracks plus remixes of a few of their hits. It was another top 40 seller there, and the 2000 studio album Rico peaked at number 48.

=== 2003–2015: Reunion of the original trio and beyond ===
In 2003, initiated by a mutual friend, Basia Trzetrzelewska and Danny White joined Mark Reilly to reform the original Matt Bianco line-up; original bassist Kito Poncioni had died in the late 1990s. Now again a trio, Matt Bianco signed to EmArcy Records and released the album Matt's Mood in spring 2004, named after one of their early instrumental tracks. The album featured adult contemporary/jazz numbers, in the spirit of their first LP. It was a moderate chart success internationally. The following year, the band embarked on a world tour, which included stops in the UK, Japan, and the United States. Following the tour, Trzetrzelewska and White left Matt Bianco again to reinvigorate Basia's solo career. Reilly reunited with Fisher, and Matt Bianco were back as a duo.

After signing with earMUSIC, a division of Edel, the band released studio albums HiFi Bossanova and Hideaway in 2009 and 2012, respectively.

=== 2016 onwards ===
Mark Reilly (without Mark Fisher) released a collaborative album with New Cool Collective in 2016, The Things You Love, credited to "Matt Bianco (Mark Reilly) Meets New Cool Collective". It featured nine new tracks and a re-recording of "Don't Blame It on That Girl". Fisher died on 12 December 2016. Reilly carried on under the Matt Bianco moniker, and released a new album, Gravity, in 2017. In October 2017, Cherry Red Records re-issued their album Matt Bianco in a 2-CD deluxe edition format, having re-issued a similarly packaged version of Whose Side Are You On? in June 2016.

November 2020 saw the release of a second collaboration album with New Cool Collective, High Anxiety. In June 2022, Matt Bianco released a double album The Essential Matt Bianco. Re-imagined, Re-loved, which featured new versions of 15 of their classic songs plus 15 remixes and special versions. In September 2025, the band released yet another album, Masquerader.

== Band members ==
Current members

- Mark Reilly (born 20 February 1960 in High Wycombe) – vocals (since 1983)

Past members

- Danny White – keyboards (1983–1985; 2003–2005)
- Basia Trzetrzelewska – vocals (1983–1985; 2003–2005)
- Kito Poncioni – bass guitar (1983–1984)
- Mark Fisher – keyboards
- Jenni Evans – vocals

== Discography ==
- Whose Side Are You On? (1984)
- Matt Bianco (1986)
- Indigo (1988)
- Samba in Your Casa (1991)
- Another Time Another Place (1993)
- Gran Via (1995)
- World Go Round (1997)
- Rico (2000)
- Echoes (2002)
- Matt's Mood (2004)
- Hifi Bossanova (2009)
- Hideaway (2012)
- The Things You Love (2016; with New Cool Collective)
- Gravity (2017)
- High Anxiety (2020; with New Cool Collective)
- Masquerader (2025)
