= Sheila Rock =

American photographer

- Born: Illinois USA
- Education: Boston University London Film School
- Occupation: Photographer
- Years active: since 1977 to present
- Spouse: Mick Rock 7 years Lincoln Norton present
- Children: none
- Website: sheilarock.com

Sheila Rock is an American photographer who was active in London since 1977. Rock is primarily known for her music photography, specifically her work during the punk and post-punk scene.

In 2017, from April 26 to July 4, the Barbican Music Library and Barbican Art Gallery hosted an exhibit of Rock's work including some of her vintage prints from the 1970s.

Her work is included in the collection of the Museum of Fine Arts Houston and the National Portrait Gallery, London and the V&A London . She has published four books of her works.

She studied at Boston University, and London Film School. She was married to Mick Rock, who was also a photographer.

== Publications ==
- Sera (2003)
- Horses
- Punk+ (2013)
- Tough & Tender (2015)
- Young Punks (2020)
- 80s Sound and Vision (2022)
- New Romantics from Billy's to the People's Palace (2023)
