= Ronnie Ross =

British jazz saxophonist (1933–1991)

- Born: Albert Ronald Ross; 2 October 1933; Calcutta, India
- Died: 12 December 1991 (aged 58) London, England
- Genre: Jazz
- Occupation: Musician
- Instrument: Baritone saxophone
- Years active: 1950–1991

Albert Ronald Ross (2 October 1933 – 12 December 1991) was a British jazz baritone saxophonist.

== Life ==
Born in Calcutta, India, to Scottish parents, Ross moved to England in 1946 and was educated at the Perse School in Cambridge. He began playing tenor saxophone in the 1950s with Tony Kinsey, Ted Heath, and Don Rendell. During his tenure with Rendell, he switched to baritone saxophone. He played at the Newport Jazz Festival in 1958, and formed a group called the Jazz Makers with drummer Allan Ganley that same year. He toured the United States in 1959 and Europe later that year with the Modern Jazz Quartet. From 1961 to 1965 he played with Bill Le Sage, and later with Woody Herman, John Dankworth, Friedrich Gulda, and Clark Terry.

Ross was a saxophone tutor for a young David Bowie, played baritone saxophone on The Beatles' White Album track, "Savoy Truffle", and four years later was the baritone sax soloist on the Lou Reed song "Walk on the Wild Side", which was co-produced by Bowie. He also had guest appearances as a soloist on several Matt Bianco albums. The 2004 Matt Bianco album, Matt's Mood, contains three songs composed by band member Danny White, that were drawn from demos he and Ross recorded together – including the tribute song "Ronnie's Samba".

He died, having been diagnosed with cancer, in London, in December 1991, aged 58.

== Discography ==
=== As leader or co-leader ===
- Double Event (later released as Stompin' With The Ronnie Ross Quintet - 1958) - Ronnie Ross (alto and baritone sax), Bert Courtley (trumpet, mellophone), Eddie Harvey (piano, trombone), Pete Blanin (bass), Andy White (drums).
- The Swingin' Sounds Of The Jazz Makers (1959) - Ronnie Ross (alto and baritone sax), Allan Ganley (drums), Art Ellefson (tenor sax), Stan Jones (piano), Stan Wasser (bass).
- Presenting The Bill Le Sage - Ronnie Ross Quartet (April 1963) - Bill Le Sage (piano, vibes), Ronnie Ross (baritone sax), Spike Heatley (bass), Allan Ganley (drums).
- Cleopatra's Needle (1968) - Ronnie Ross (baritone sax), Spike Heatley (bass), Art Ellefson (tenor sax), Les Condon (trumpet), Bill Le Sage (vibes and piano), Tony Carr (drums).
