= Mark Fisher (musician) =

British session keyboardist (1959–2016)

Mark Fisher (3 December 1959 – 12 December 2016) was a British session keyboardist. He was the first keyboard player for Wham! and performed on their 1985-1986 world tour. He also worked with Sister Sledge, and was one-half of Matt Bianco. His father is Tony Fisher, a trumpeter who worked with Frank Sinatra, Sarah Vaughan, and Oscar Peterson, and recorded with The Beatles during the Sgt. Pepper's Lonely Hearts Club Band sessions, appearing on "Strawberry Fields Forever".
