= Sophisti-pop =

1980s British subgenre of pop music

- Stylistic origins: Pop; soul; smooth jazz; new wave; synth-pop
- Cultural origins: Mid-1980s, United Kingdom
- Typical instruments: Saxophone; synthesizer; drums; guitar; bass guitar

Sophisti-pop (short for "sophisticated pop") is a pop music subgenre that developed during the mid-1980s out of the British new wave era. It originated with acts who blended elements of jazz, soul, and pop with lavish production. The term "sophisti-pop" was coined only after the genre's peak in the mid-1980s.

== Characteristics ==
Sophisti-pop is characterised by its extensive use of electronic keyboards, synthesizers, and polished arrangements. Artists also utilized cutting-edge studio technology and perfectionist recording methods. The genre has been described as mellow, romantic, and atmospheric, with artists often adopting a sharp, well-dressed and well-groomed visual presentation.

== History ==
Stylus Magazine suggested that acts had been influenced by the work of Roxy Music (such as 1982's Avalon, often cited as the first sophisti-pop album), and Bryan Ferry's Boys and Girls (1985) and Bête Noire (1987).

Sweetwater named major artists in the genre as including the Blue Nile, Prefab Sprout, the Style Council, Scritti Politti, Everything but the Girl, and Danny Wilson. AllMusic added Simply Red, Sade, Basia, and Swing Out Sister. Writer Iain Munn added to the list Level 42, the Blow Monkeys, and Joe Jackson's 1984 album Body and Soul.

British singer-songwriter Black, whose 1987 hit "Wonderful Life" has also been classified as sophisti-pop by AllMusic.

The genre's mainstream popularity declined during the 1990s.

== See also ==
- List of sophisti-pop artists
- Progressive soul
- Plastic soul
- Progressive pop
- Quiet storm
