= Howard Jones discography =

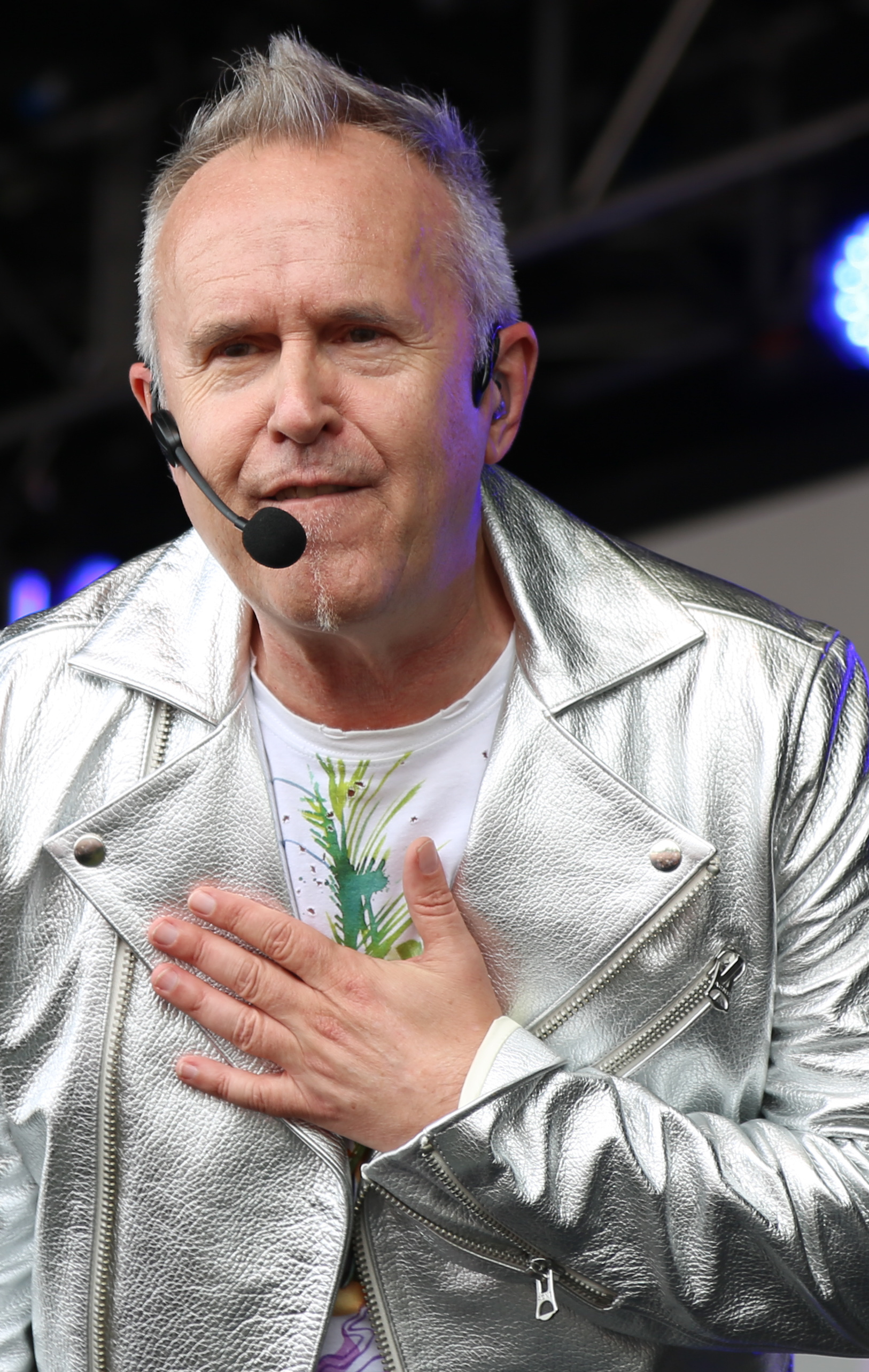
- Jones performing in 2015
- Studio albums: 15
- Extended plays: 1
- Live albums: 8
- Compilation albums: 12
- Singles: 34

This is a discography for the English musician Howard Jones.

== Albums ==
=== Studio albums ===
Title	Album details	Peak chart positions											Certifications
Title	Album details	UK	AUS	CAN	GER	ITA	NED	NOR	NZ	SWE	SWI	US	Certifications
Human's Lib	Released: 1984; Label: WEA/Elektra	1	68	18	8	—	15	13	21	5	12	59	UK: 2× Platinum; CAN: Gold
Dream into Action	Released: 1985; Label: WEA/Elektra	2	17	10	20	12	26	4	35	1	19	10	UK: Gold; CAN: Platinum; US: Platinum
One to One	Released: 1986; Label: Elektra/Asylum	10	65	24	—	—	70	—	—	27	—	59	UK: Gold
Cross That Line	Released: 1989; Label: WEA/Elektra	64	97	42	—	—	—	—	—	—	—	65	
In the Running	Released: June 1992; Label: Elektra/East West	—	158	—	—	—	—	—	—	—	—	—	
Working in the Backroom	Released: 1993; Label: Dtox	—	—	—	—	—	—	—	—	—	—	—	
Angels & Lovers	Released: 1997; Label: Pony Canyon Inc.	—	—	—	—	—	—	—	—	—	—	—	
People	Released: 1998; Label: Ark 21	—	—	—	—	—	—	—	—	—	—	—	
Piano Solos (For Friends and Loved Ones)	Released: 2003; Label: Dtox	—	—	—	—	—	—	—	—	—	—	—	
Revolution of the Heart	Released: 2005; Label: Koch	—	—	—	—	—	—	—	—	—	—	—	
Piano Solos (For Friends and Loved Ones) Vol. 2	Released: 2006; Label: Dtox	—	—	—	—	—	—	—	—	—	—	—	
Ordinary Heroes	Released: 2009; Label: Dtox	—	—	—	—	—	—	—	—	—	—	—	
Engage	Released: 2015; Label: Dtox	—	—	—	—	—	—	—	—	—	—	—	
Transform	Released: 2019; Label: Dtox	49	—	—	—	—	—	—	—	—	—	—	
Dialogue	Released: 2022; Label: Dtox	—	—	—	—	—	—	—	—	—	—	—	
Piano Composed Ivory	Released: 2025; Released on vinyl only; Label: Cherry Red Records	—	—	—	—	—	—	—	—	—	—	—	
Piano Composed Spirio	Released: 2025; Released on CD only; Label: Cherry Red Records	—	—	—	—	—	—	—	—	—	—	—	
"—" denotes a recording that did not chart or was not released in that territory.

=== Compilation albums ===
Title	Album details	Peak chart positions					Certifications
Title	Album details	UK	UK Sales	AUS	GER	SWE	Certifications
The 12″ Album	Released: 1984; Label: WEA/Elektra	15	15	56	49	20	UK: Gold
12″ers Vol. 2	Released: 1985; Label: WEA	—	—	—	—	—	
The Best of Howard Jones	Released: 1993; Label: East West	36	36	—	—	—	UK: Silver
Perform.00	Released: 2000; Label: Dtox	—	—	—	—	—	
Perform.01	Released: 2001 (US); Label: Dtox	—	—	—	—	—	
The Very Best of Howard Jones	Released: 2003; Label: Dtox	—	—	—	—	—	
The Ultimate Collection	Released: 2005; Label: Warner Strategic Marketing	115	115	—	—	—	
The Platinum Collection	Released: 2006; Label: Rhino	—	—	—	—	—	
Revolution Remixed & Surrounded	Released: 2007; Label: Dtox	—	—	—	—	—	
C3lebrati0n	Released: 2013; Label: Dtox	—	—	—	—	—	
Best 1983–2017	Released: 2017; Label: Cherry Red	—	—	—	—	—	
Celebrate It Together – The Very Best of Howard Jones 1983–2023	Released: 2023; Released as 2×CD, 4×CD and translucent mint green 2×LP versions; Label: Cherry Red	—	24	—	—	—	
"—" denotes a recording that did not chart or was not released in that territory.

=== Live albums ===
Title	Album details
Live Acoustic America	Released: 1996; Label: Plump
The Peaceful Tour Live	Released: 2001; Label: Plump Dtox
Live in Birkenhead (with Robin Boult)	Released: 2007; Label: Plump Dtox
The 25th Anniversary Concert Live at The indigO2	Released: 2008; Label: Dtox, Live Here Now
Live at The IndigO2 2010	Released: 2012; Label: Dtox
Live at Siyan	Released: 2020; Label: Dtox
Live at Union Chapel with Nick Beggs and Robin Boult	Released: 2021; Label: Dtox
Live at the NHK Hall, Tokyo Japan 1984	Released: 2022; Label: Cherry Red

=== Video albums ===
Title	Album details
Live in Salt Lake City	Released: 12 June 2007; Studio: E1 Entertainment Distribution; Formats: DVD

== Extended plays ==
Title	Details	Peak chart positions
Title	Details	US
Action Replay	Released: 1986; Label: Elektra	34

== Singles ==
=== As main artist ===
Title	Year	Peak chart positions													Certifications	Album
Title	Year	UK	UK Network	UK Airplay	AUS	BEL (FLA)	CAN	GER	IRE	ITA	NED	NZ	SWE	US	Certifications	Album
"New Song"	1983	3	4	—	60	—	22	19	3	—	—	—	10	27	UK: Silver	Human's Lib
"What Is Love?"	1983	2	2	—	31	16	49	6	3	18	—	—	10	33	UK: Silver	Human's Lib
"Hide and Seek"	1984	12	11	—	—	38	—	38	5	—	32	—	—	—		Human's Lib
"Pearl in the Shell"	1984	7	7	—	—	—	—	60	2	—	—	—	—	108		Human's Lib
"Like to Get to Know You Well"	1984	4	3	—	16	—	68	56	3	18	—	—	8	49	UK: Silver	Dream into Action
"Things Can Only Get Better"	1985	6	4	—	11	12	9	—	5	11	—	—	3	5	UK: Silver	Dream into Action
"Look Mama"	1985	10	9	—	20	30	—	24	3	6	—	—	17	—		Dream into Action
"Life in One Day"	1985	14	12	—	33	30	33	57	3	47	23	39	—	19		Dream into Action
"No One Is to Blame"	1986	16	14	—	9	—	5	—	4	14	47	49	—	4		Dream into Action
"All I Want"	1986	35	25	—	83	—	—	—	13	31	—	—	—	76		One to One
"You Know I Love You... Don't You?"	1986	43	34	—	61	—	26	—	—	—	—	—	—	17		One to One
"Will You Still Be There?"	1986	—	—	—	—	—	—	—	—	—	—	—	—	—		One to One
"Little Bit of Snow"	1987	70	72	—	—	—	—	—	30	—	—	—	—	—		One to One
"Everlasting Love"	1989	62	59	—	91	—	3	—	—	—	—	—	—	12		Cross That Line
"The Prisoner"	1989	98	—	—	—	—	49	—	—	—	—	—	—	30		Cross That Line
"Lift Me Up"	1992	52	40	25	131	—	6	—	—	—	—	—	—	32		In the Running
"Two Souls"	1992	—	—	—	—	—	—	53	—	—	—	—	—	—		In the Running
"Tears to Tell"	1992	—	—	—	—	—	66	—	—	—	—	—	—	—		In the Running
"I.G.Y. (What a Beautiful World)"	1993	76	—	34	—	—	—	52	—	—	—	—	—	—		The Best of Howard Jones
"Angels & Lovers"	1997	—	—	—	—	—	—	—	—	—	—	—	—	—		Angels & Lovers
"Dreamin' On"	1997	—	—	—	—	—	—	—	—	—	—	—	—	—		People
"Tomorrow Is Now"	1998	—	—	41	—	—	—	99	—	—	—	—	—	—		People
"Let the People Have Their Say"	1998	99	—	49	—	—	—	85	—	—	—	—	—	—		People
"No One Is to Blame" (live)	2000	—	—	—	—	—	—	—	—	—	—	—	—	—		Perform.00
"Someone You Need" (with Duncan Sheik)	2000	—	—	—	—	—	—	—	—	—	—	—	—	—		Perform.00
"Everlasting Love" (live)	2001	—	—	—	—	—	—	—	—	—	—	—	—	—		Perform.00
"Revolution of the Heart"	2003	—	—	—	—	—	—	—	—	—	—	—	—	—		Revolution of the Heart
"Just Look at You Now"	2005	—	—	—	—	—	—	—	—	—	—	—	—	—		Revolution of the Heart
"Building Our Own Future"	2006	—	—	—	—	—	—	—	—	—	—	—	—	—		Non-album single
"Soon You'll Go"	2009	—	—	—	—	—	—	—	—	—	—	—	—	—		Ordinary Heroes
"Hold on to Your Heart"	2015	—	—	—	—	—	—	—	—	—	—	—	—	—		Engage
"Beating Mr. Neg"	2019	—	—	—	—	—	—	—	—	—	—	—	—	—		Transform
"Hero in Your Eyes"	2019	—	—	—	—	—	—	—	—	—	—	—	—	—		Transform
"The One to Love You"	2019	—	—	—	—	—	—	—	—	—	—	—	—	—		Transform
"—" denotes a recording that did not chart or was not released in that territory.

=== As featured artist ===
Title	Year	Peak chart positions		
Title	Year	UK	UK Dance	AUS
"Slip Away" (Mohito featuring Howard Jones)	2005	82	23	96
