= The Best of Howard Jones =

Greatest hits album by Howard Jones
- Released: 29 June 1993
- Recorded: 1983–1992
- Genre: Rock; pop
- Length: 78:19
- Label: Elektra; East West
- Producer: Various

Howard Jones chronology
In the Running (1992)	The Best of Howard Jones (1993)	Working in the Backroom (1994)

Singles from The Best of
- 1. "I.G.Y. (What a Beautiful World)" Released: 26 April 1993

Professional ratings
Review scores
Source	Rating
AllMusic	4.5/5 stars

The Best of Howard Jones is a compilation album by the British pop musician Howard Jones. It compiles key hits and album tracks from 1983–1992 during Jones's tenure on the Warner music label, plus one new track, a cover of Donald Fagen's "I.G.Y. (What a Beautiful World)". It does not include Jones's last UK Top 40 hit, "All I Want", from 1986. The album was certified Silver in the UK.

== Track listing ==
All tracks are written by Howard Jones unless otherwise noted.

No.	Title	Original album	Length
1.	"What Is Love?" (writers: Jones, William Bryant)	Human's Lib	3:41
2.	"New Song"	Human's Lib	4:15
3.	"Pearl in the Shell"	Human's Lib	3:59
4.	"Always Asking Questions" (writers: Jones, William Bryant)	The 12″ Album	4:27
5.	"Things Can Only Get Better"	Dream into Action	3:57
6.	"Like to Get to Know You Well"	Dream into Action	4:01
7.	"Life in One Day"	Dream into Action	3:39
8.	"You Know I Love You... Don't You?"	One to One	4:05
9.	"Hide and Seek"	Human's Lib	4:49
10.	"No One Is to Blame" (single version)	Action Replay (EP)	4:12
11.	"Look Mama"	Dream into Action	4:05
12.	"The Prisoner"	Cross That Line	4:40
13.	"Everlasting Love"	Cross That Line	4:20
14.	"Lift Me Up" (writers: Jones, Ross Cullum)	In the Running	3:40
15.	"Tears to Tell"	In the Running	4:19
16.	"Two Souls" (writers: Jones, Andy Ross, Cullum)	In the Running	4:24
17.	"I.G.Y. (What a Beautiful World)" (writer: Donald Fagen)	Previously unreleased	5:07
18.	"City Song"	In the Running	7:16

== Charts ==
Chart performance for The Best of Howard Jones
Chart (1993)	Peak position
UK Albums (OCC)	36

== Certifications ==
Region	Certification	Certified units/sales
United Kingdom (BPI)	Silver	60,000^{^}
^{^} Shipments figures based on certification alone.
