= Live Acoustic America =

Live album by Howard Jones
- Released: 1996
- Recorded: April 28, 1992; Mixed in September 1994
- Venues: Variety Arts Theater (Los Angeles, California, USA)
- Genres: Acoustic; rock; pop
- Length: 71:18
- Label: Plump Records
- Producer: Howard Jones

Howard Jones chronology
| Working in the Backroom (1994) | Live Acoustic America (1996) | Angels & Lovers (1997) |

Live Acoustic America is an acoustic live album by the British musician Howard Jones, released in 1996. It was recorded in 1992 in Los Angeles to a sell-out crowd as part of his acoustic tour which travelled the world, with Jones playing venues in Europe, the USA and Jamaica. The tour accompanied the release of the piano-based album In the Running and featured pared-back versions of his hits, album tracks, and the Beatles cover "Come Together". It features Carol Steele on percussion.

== Track listing ==
1. "Intro/Pearl in the Shell" - 3:44
2. "Don't Always Look At The Rain" - 2:56
3. "Fallin' Away" - 4:25
4. "Exodus/Come Together" - 5:29
5. "You Know I Love You... Don't You?" - 2:59
6. "Out Of Thin Air" - 3:00
7. "One Last Try" - 3:55
8. "Like to Get to Know You Well" - 4:42
9. "City Song" - 5:02
10. "Lift Me Up" - 3:35
11. "Tape To Tape Rag" - 1:19
12. "Everlasting Love" - 5:56
13. "Life in One Day" - 6:18
14. "Things Can Only Get Better" - 5:01
15. "What Is Love?" - 4:17
16. "New Song" - 3:24
17. "No One Is to Blame" - 5:07

== Credits ==
- Howard Jones – vocals, grand piano
- Carol Steele – percussion, backing vocals (5, 9)
- Harry Andronis – recording
- Steve Venezia – recording, sound engineer
- Stephen W. Tayler – mixing at The Shed (Maidenhead, UK)
- Paul Ridout – art direction, design
- Simon Fowler – black & white photography
- Berny Gilson – color photography
- D.J. Howie – tour manager
- David Stopps – management
- Jeanette Humphreys – management
