= You Know I Love You =

You Know I Love You may refer to:

- "You Know I Love You", a song by The Pigeon Detectives from the album Wait for Me
- "You Know I Love You" (B. B. King song)
- "You Know I Love You... Don't You?", a song by Howard Jones
