= Ordinary Heroes =

Ordinary Heroes may refer to:

- Ordinary Heroes (album), an album by Howard Jones
- Ordinary Heroes (novel), a novel by Scott Turow
- Ordinary Heroes (1986 film), an American film directed by Peter H. Cooper
- Ordinary Heroes (1999 film), a Hong Kong film directed by Ann Hui

== See also ==
- Ordinary Hero (disambiguation)
