= Let It Flow =

Let It Flow may refer to:

- Let It Flow, a 1974 album by Elvin Bishop
- Let It Flow, a 1977 album by Dave Mason
- "Let It Flow" (song), a 1995 song by Toni Braxton
- "Let It Flow", a 1978 song by Gasolin' from the album Killin' Time
- "Let It Flow", a 1987 song by Howard Jones from single "Little Bit of Snow"
- "Let It Flow", a 1989 song by Heavy D & the Boyz from the album Big Tyme
- "Let It Flow", a 1991 song by Erasure from the EP "Am I Right?"
- "Let It Flow", a 1995 song by Spiritualized from Pure Phase
- "Let It Flow", a 1996 song by Ash from the album 1977
- "Let It Flow", a 1996 song by Tab Two from the album Belle Affaire
- "Let It Flow", a 1997 song by En Vogue from the album EV3
- "Let It Flow", a 1998 song by Union from their self-titled debut album
- "Let It Flow", a 2002 song by Jeff Deyo from the album Saturate
- "Let It Flow (Get You in the Mood)", a 2003 song by KRS-One from the album D.I.G.I.T.A.L.
- "Let It Flow", a 2004 song by Carried Away from the album Closer to You
- "Let It Flow", a 2006 song by Stephy Tang, used as a theme song for Hong Kong series Love Guaranteed

== See also ==
- "Cycle (Let It Flow)", a 1982 song by Gary Brooker
