= Transform (Howard Jones album) =

Studio album by Howard Jones
- Released: 10 May 2019
- Studios: Recognizer Studios, Bristol
- Genres: Pop, synth-pop
- Length: 44:35
- Label: D-tox
- Producers: Howard Jones; BT; Robbie Bronnimann

Howard Jones chronology
Engage (2015)	Transform (2019)	Dialogue (2022)

Singles from Transform
- 1. "Beating Mr. Neg" Released: March 2019; 2. "Hero in Your Eyes" Released: April 2019; 3. "The One to Love You" Released: April 2019

Transform is a 2019 studio album by the English musician Howard Jones. It is the first proper studio album from Jones in a decade, and was released on 10 May 2019 on CD and vinyl formats.

== Background ==
Transform was conceived from multiple situations. One being when former Take That frontman Gary Barlow asked Jones to produce songs for the soundtrack to the 2016 movie Eddie the Eagle. Two songs were written for the soundtrack, with one—"Eagle Will Fly Again"—being featured on Transform. Jones recalls that after writing the two tracks, he thought about returning to his electronic roots.

Another build up was when Jones collaborated with fellow friend and fan BT for three tracks. "The One to Love You", the first song on the album, was the first of their endeavours. The final catalyst was, of course, the fans who relentlessly asked for a new synth-based album from the musician. Jones also teamed up again with producer Robbie Bronnimann, who was present on the 2005 album Revolution of the Heart.

When asked about the lyrics in Transform, Jones responded by stating he wanted the music to be relevant to those in his generation when it comes to "having kids or battling with negative forces". He continues by adding, "My lyrics are about how we can work on our own attitude to life to be happier with it. It starts with us. If we stand up and say no we aren’t having it anymore. Then it will change."

Jones embarked on a summer tour to promote the album with Men Without Hats and BT and his group All Hail the Silence.

== Reception ==
Professional ratings
Review scores
Source	Rating
Paste	8.4/10
The Times	2/5 stars
Cryptic Rock	4/5 stars
Belfast Telegraph	8/10
Classic Pop	4/5 stars

Transform received mostly positive reviews. Libby Cudmore of Paste felt Transform was both familiar and innovative; saying that Howard Jones had returned stronger than ever. She praised the complexity of the beats and keyboard lines on "The One to Love You", "Take Us Higher", and "Tin Man", while also noting that the lyrics are "honest" and "tailor-made for the montage that plays in your head while...running at the gym...[or] indulging in some much-needed self-care."

Alfie Vera Mella of Cryptic Rock considered the album to be "another testimony of [Jones'] greatness" when it comes to adapting to modern music without sacrificing his trademark sound. Vera Mella praised "Take Us Higher"'s "dancey mood" by comparing it to the likes of 1990's alternative dance bands (The Farm, Pop Will Eat Itself) and early synthpop (The Human League). He also appreciated the melodramatic "Tin Man" and passionate ballad "Mother", but considered "Hero in Your Eyes" to be the album's highlight.

Wyndham Wallace of Classic Pop magazine praised Jones for sticking to his nostalgic roots. He found the album to be full of "jolly" and "nifty" tracks, but still able to "successfully...show [Jones'] touchy-feely side". He gave the album the designation "Best New Release" of May 2019.

== Track listing ==
All tracks are written by Howard Jones except where noted.

No.	Title	Writer(s)	Length
1.	"The One to Love You"	Jones; Brian Transeau	4:21
2.	"Take Us Higher"		3:38
3.	"Beating Mr. Neg"		5:41
4.	"Transform"	Jones; Transeau	3:39
5.	"Hero in Your Eyes"		4:17
6.	"Tin Man Song"		5:58
7.	"At the Speed of Love"	Jones; Transeau	4:12
8.	"Eagle Will Fly Again"		4:13
9.	"Mother"		4:41
10.	"Stay with Me"		3:55
Total length:			44:35

CD Deluxe edition
No.	Title	Length
1.	"Take Us Higher (12" Mix)"
2.	"Beating Mr. Neg (12" Mix)"
3.	"Hero in Your Eyes (12" Mix)"
4.	"Tin Man Song (12" Mix)"
5.	"Level View Chill"

== Credits ==
Musicians

- Howard Jones – all vocals and instruments, except
- Christian Burns – additional backing vocals (1)
- Aric Johnson – vocal Dolby magic effects (1, 4, 7)
- Mike DiMattia – vocal comps (1, 4, 7)
- BT – additional instruments (1, 4, 7)
- Jonathan Atkinson – drums (8)
- Robbie Bronnimann – strings (9)
- Robin Boult – guitars (10)

Production

- BT – producer (1, 4, 7), mixing (1, 4, 7)
- Robbie Bronnimann – producer (2, 3, 5, 6, 8–10), mixing (2, 3, 5, 6, 8–10)
- Howard Jones – producer (2, 3, 5, 6, 8–10)
- Stephen W. Tayler – vocal recording (1, 10)
- Steven Cripps Graphic Design – design
- Simon Fowler – design concept, photography

== Charts ==
Chart (2019)	Peak position
UK Independent Albums (Official Charts)	7
Scottish Albums (Official Charts)	18
UK Albums (Official Charts)	49
