= Ordinary Hero =

Ordinary Hero may refer to:

- Un eroe borghese, also known as Ordinary Hero, a 1995 Italian historical drama film
- Ordinary Hero (2022 film), a Chinese drama film
- "Ordinary Hero" (Cagney & Lacey), a 1985 television episode

== See also ==
- Ordinary Heroes (disambiguation)
