= Little Bit of Snow =

Single by Howard Jones

from the album One To One
- Released: 2 March 1987
- Genre: New wave
- Length: 4:30
- Label: WEA
- Songwriter: Howard Jones
- Producer: Arif Mardin

Howard Jones singles chronology
| "You Know I Love You... Don't You?" (1986) | "Little Bit of Snow" (1987) | "Everlasting Love" (1989) |

"Little Bit of Snow" was a 1987 single taken from British singer-songwriter Howard Jones' third studio album, One To One. No video was made to promote the single, which reached number 70 in the UK Singles Chart. The song was not released as a single in the US.

Jones donated the song to the 1986 Anti-Heroin Project charity album, It's a Live-In World. The use of the word snow in the lyrics referred to cocaine. It was the first of Jones' singles to be released on cassette. While not a huge success in the UK sales charts the track did reach number 30 in Ireland. The 12" contains two orchestral versions of "Hide and Seek" and "Hunger for the Flesh", which were recorded at Abbey Road Studios.

== Track listing ==
7"

- "Little Bit Of Snow" – 4:30
- "Let It Flow" – 3:47

12"/cassette

- "Little Bit Of Snow" – 4:30
- "Let It Flow" – 3:47
- "Will You Still Be There" (New Version) – 4:37
- "Hunger For The Flesh" (Orchestral) – 4:58
- "Hide and Seek" (Orchestral) – 7:09

== Charts ==
| Chart (1987) | Peak position |
|---|---|
| UK Singles (Official Charts) | 70 |
