= Revolution of the Heart =

Studio album by Howard Jones
- Released: 2005
- Genre: Rock; pop
- Length: 52:38
- Label: Koch
- Producer: Howard Jones; Robbie Bronnimann

Howard Jones chronology
The Very Best of Howard Jones (2003)	Revolution of the Heart (2005)	Revolution Remixed & Surrounded (2007)

Revolution of the Heart is the eighth studio album by the British musician Howard Jones, released in 2005. This album marked a return to the electronic production that featured on Jones' early albums. Several promo singles were released - "Just Look at You Now" and "Revolution of the Heart". Notably, the album's lyrics are broadly influenced by Nichiren Buddhism, which Jones began practicing in the early 1990s. The album was released in several formats, including a limited-edition version sold through Jones' website, which sold out quickly. A double disc was released in some territories which included several remixed tracks, while the Japanese edition contained some reworked versions of old hits as bonus tracks.

== Track listing ==
All tracks are written by Howard Jones and Robbie Bronnimann, except where noted.

No.	Title	Writer(s)	Length
1.	"Celebrate Our Love"		4:42
2.	"Respected"		5:37
3.	"Just Look at You Now"		4:21
4.	"Revolution of the Heart"		3:15
5.	"I've Said Too Much"		5:06
6.	"The Presence of Other"		6:15
7.	"Black & White"		5:25
8.	"Another Chance"		5:49
9.	"Stir It Up"	Jones, Bronnimann, Robin Boult	3:31
10.	"For You, See Me"		8:34

Japan bonus tracks
No.	Title	Writer(s)	Length
11.	"Just Look at You Now" (The Young Punx Mix)		8:09
12.	"New Song" (Revisited)	Jones	4:17

Italy bonus tracks
No.	Title	Length
11.	"Just Look at You Now" (dba Mix)	7:37
12.	"Revolution of the Heart" (John B Mix)	7:55
13.	"For You, See Me" (John B Mix)	6:31

Australia bonus disc
No.	Title	Writer(s)	Length
1.	"Things Can Only Get Better" (Robbie Bronnimann Mix)	Jones	6:35
2.	"Revolution of the Heart" (John B Mix)		7:55
3.	"Slip Away" (Steve Angello & The Young Punx Mix)	Cameron Sauders, Hal Ritson, Jones, Mark Conlin	5:32
4.	"Just Look at You Now" (The Young Punx Mix)		8:09
5.	"Slip Away" (Filthy Rich Mix)	Sauders, Ritson, Jones, Conlin	5:38
6.	"For You, See Me" (John B Electro Rock Drum & Bass Mix)		6:31
7.	"Revolution of the Heart" (dba Mix)		7:08
8.	"Just Look at You Now" (dba Mix)		7:37
9.	"What Is Love?" (Hojo Vocal dba Mix)	Jones, William Bryant	7:16

"Slip Away" is performed by Mohito featuring Howard Jones.

== Personnel ==
- Howard Jones – vocals, acoustic piano, Moog Prodigy, keyboard programming, producer
- Robbie Bronnimann – virtual instruments, Macintosh computer, sound design, producer, mixing
- Robin Boult – guitars
- Shaz Sparks – backing vocals (1, 3, 4)
- Mark "Busk" Conlin – vocals (3, 5) (Australian Bonus Disc)
- Ian Walden – sleeve design, illustration, additional and image photography
- Freddie Walker – cover photography
