= Lift Me Up (Howard Jones song) =

Single by Howard Jones

from the album In the Running
- Released: 30 March 1992
- Genre: Synthpop, pop rock
- Length: 3:39
- Label: WEA UK; Elektra Records US – Elektra 64779
- Songwriters: Ross Cullum, Howard Jones
- Producers: Ross Cullum, Howard Jones

Howard Jones singles chronology
"The Prisoner" (1989)	"Lift Me Up" (1992)	"Two Souls" (1992)

"Lift Me Up" is a song by British singer-songwriter Howard Jones. It was written and produced by Ross Cullum and Jones, and released in March 1992 by WEA, as the first single from Jones' fifth studio album, In the Running (1992). The song has been featured on several of Jones' compilations and live albums, including 1993's The Best of Howard Jones, 1996's Live Acoustic America and 2004's The Very Best of Howard Jones.

== Chart performance ==
"Lift Me Up" was released as a single on 30 March 1992 and reached numbers 25 and 32 on the US Cash Box Top 100 and Billboard Hot 100 charts, and number 13 on the Radio & Records Contemporary Hit Radio chart. It was Jones' ninth and last Billboard top-40 hit. The song also reached number 10 on the Billboard Adult Contemporary chart, his last hit on that chart to date. In Canada, the song peaked at number six, making it the last top-10 hit of Jones' career in any nation.

== Charts ==
Chart (1992)	Peak position
Australia (ARIA)	131
UK Singles (OCC)	52
UK Network Chart Network Chart	40
UK Airplay Chart Music Week	25
US Billboard Hot 100	32
US Adult Contemporary (Billboard)	10
US Cash Box Top 100	25

== Personnel ==
- Howard Jones – vocals, keyboards (incl. piano, synthesized guitars and bass)
- Ross Cullum – drums
- Tessa Niles, Carol Kenyon – backing vocals
