= Perform.00 =

Studio album by Howard Jones
- Released: 2000–2001
- Genre: Rock, pop
- Length: 71:51
- Label: Dtox – UK; Avex – Japan; BCI Eclipse – US
- Producer: Howard Jones

Howard Jones chronology
People (1998)	Perform.00 (2000)	The Peaceful Tour Live (2002)

Perform.00 is a collection of Howard Jones favorites re-recorded by Jones and the backup band that accompanied him on tour to support his 1998 album People, and on the VH-1 Big Rewind tour of the late 90s (where he appeared on the same bill as The Human League and Culture Club). The bassist for the tours and on this album was Nick Beggs, known better as the bassist for Kajagoogoo. Drummer Kevin Wilkinson and guitarist Robin Boult also contributed to both projects.

Many of the artist's older songs are given an updated, stadium rock sound; Jones plays mostly piano and organ, with only an occasional hint of his trademark synthesizers. There are three new tracks: "Love Is A Good Thing", "I Must Go" and "Someone You Need" (a collaboration with Duncan Sheik).

== Versions ==
Various versions of the album were released in different markets around the world:

Territory	Release Date	Album title	Notes
Europe	10 July 2000	Perform.00	
Worldwide (internet release)	1 August 2000	Pefawm	Limited edition two-disc set
UK	Jan 2001	Perform.00	
Japan	25 July 2001	Metamorphosis	Includes exclusive club remix of "What Is Love?"
US	14 August 2001	Perform.01	

== Track listing ==
=== Perform.00 / Perform.01 ===
1. "You Know I Love You...Don't You?" – 3:38
2. "Love Is A Good Thing" – 3:46
3. "No One Is To Blame" – 4:44
4. "Someone You Need" – 3:34
5. "Everlasting Love" – 4:20
6. "I Must Go" – 5:49
7. "Tomorrow Is Now" – 4:19
8. "Pearl In The Shell" – 4:24
9. "Hide And Seek" – 10:32
10. "What Is Love?" – 6:06
11. "Let The People Have Their Say" – 3:18
12. "Like To Get To Know You Well" – 4:35
13. "New Song 99" – 4:59
14. "Things Can Only Get Better" – 7:41

=== Pefawm ===
- Disc One
1. "Pearl In The Shell" – 4:24
2. "No One Is To Blame" – 4:44
3. "Someone You Need" – 3:34
4. "Like To Get To Know You Well" – 4:35
5. "You're The Buddha" – 4:41
6. "New Song 99" – 4:59
7. "Wedding Song" – 5:56
8. "Let The People Have Their Say (Calypso)" – 3:18
9. "Tomorrow Is Now" – 4:19
10. "Things Can Only Get Better" – 7:41
- Disc Two
1. "You Know I Love You...Don't You?" – 3:38
2. "Love Is A Good Thing" – 3:46
3. "I Must Go" – 5:49
4. "Everlasting Love" – 4:20
5. "Everything" – 4:57
6. "Let The People Have Their Say (Stadium)" – 5:02
7. "Life In One Day" – 5:05
8. "Dreamin' On" – 3:58
9. "What Is Love?" – 6:06
10. "Hide And Seek" – 10:32

=== Metamorphosis ===
1. "Pearl In The Shell" – 4:25
2. "No One Is To Blame" – 4:37
3. "Someone You Need" – 3:35
4. "New Song 99" – 4:59
5. "Wedding Song" – 5:57
6. "Let The People Have Their Say (Calypso)" – 3:19
7. "Tomorrow Is Now" – 4:21
8. "Life In One Day" – 5:06
9. "Dreamin' On" – 3:59
10. "You Know I Love You...Don't You?" – 3:39
11. "What Is Love?" – 6:06
12. "Everlasting Love" – 4:20
13. "Things Can Only Get Better" – 7:43
14. "Let The People Have Their Say (Radio Edit)" – 3:40
15. "What Is Love? (Trouser Enthusiasts Club Mix)" – 8:06
