= The Peaceful Tour Live =

Live album by Howard Jones
- Released: 2001
- Genre: Rock, pop
- Length: 62:03
- Label: Dtox
- Producer: Howard Jones

Howard Jones chronology
Perform.00 (2000)	The Peaceful Tour Live (2001)	Piano Solos (for Friends and Loved Ones) (2002)

The Peaceful Tour Live is a collection of Howard Jones songs performed live and with full electronics, released in 2001. Many of the hits included were revamped with contemporary electro elements, most notably You Know I Love You Don't You? Robin Boult accompanied Howard on electric guitar for this tour and Shaz Sparks sung backing vocals and the chorus on the track All I Want.

== Track listing ==
1. "Conditioning" – 6:01
2. "New Song" – 4:49
3. "Like To Get To Know You Well" – 5:19
4. "Collective Heartbeat" – 7:17
5. "Hide And Seek" – 6:09
6. "All I Want" – 5:37
7. "Hunt The Self" – 3:59
8. "Let The People Have Their Say" – 5:12
9. "You Know I Love You...Don't You?" – 4:55
10. "Things Can Only Get Better" – 7:10
11. "What Is Love?" – 5:30
