= The Prisoner (Howard Jones song) =

Single by Howard Jones

from the album Cross That Line
- Released: 22 May 1989
- Genre: New wave
- Length: 4:40
- Label: WEA UK; Elektra Records US – Elektra 69288
- Songwriter(s): Howard Jones
- Producer(s): Chris Hughes, Ross Cullum, Ian Stanley

Howard Jones singles chronology
"Everlasting Love" (1989)	"The Prisoner" (1989)	"Lift Me Up" (1992)

"The Prisoner" is a song written and performed by British singer-songwriter Howard Jones. It was included on his 1989 album Cross That Line and released as a single in 1989, reaching number 30 on the Billboard Hot 100. It was the second single from Cross That Line, following "Everlasting Love", a number-one Adult Contemporary hit.

"The Prisoner" also appears on several of Jones' compilation albums, including 1993's The Best of Howard Jones and 2004's The Very Best of Howard Jones.

== Track listings ==
7"

A. "The Prisoner" - 4:38
B. "Rubber Morals" - 4:18

12" / CD

A. "The Prisoner (The Portmeirion Mix)" - 6:59
B1. "Rubber Morals" - 4:18
B2. "Have You Heard the News" - 3:55

12" Elektra – ED-5385 PROMO LP

A1. "The Prisoner (Edit of LP Version)" - 4:16
A2. "The Prisoner (LP Version)" - 4:38
B1. "The Prisoner (The Portmeirion Mix)" - 6:59

== Personnel ==
- Howard Jones – vocals, keyboards
- Ian Stanley – keyboards
- Chris Hughes – drums
- Andy Ross – guitar
