= Angels & Lovers =

Studio album by Howard Jones
- Released: August 20, 1997
- Studio: The Shed (Maidenhead, England)
- Genre: Rock / Pop
- Length: 59:04
- Label: Pony Canyon Inc.
- Producer: Andy Ross; Howard Jones

Howard Jones chronology
Live Acoustic America (1996)	Angels & Lovers (1997)	People (1998)

Professional ratings
Review scores
Source	Rating
AllMusic	2.5/5 stars

Angels & Lovers is an album by the British pop musician Howard Jones. It was released in 1997 in Japan only. The album was re-released worldwide the following year as People, with some minor changes to the track listing.

The two songs that were on this album but not on People, "Angels And Lovers" and "When Lovers Confess", appeared on later CD singles.

== Track listing ==
All tracks are written by Howard Jones and Andy Ross, except where noted.

No.	Title	Writer(s)	Length
1.	"If You Love"	Jones	4:37
2.	"You're the Buddha"		4:35
3.	"Sleep My Angel"		4:32
4.	"We Make the Weather"	Jones, Ross, Roy Jones	5:18
5.	"Wedding Song"	Jones, Ross, Roy Jones	4:45
6.	"Back in Your Life"		5:06
7.	"Not One of the Lonely Tonight"		6:53
8.	"Dreamin' On"		3:32
9.	"Let Me Be the First to Know"		5:15
10.	"Nothing to Fear"		6:55
11.	"When Lovers Confess"		3:43
12.	"Angels and Lovers"		3:59

Roy Jones (co-writer of lyrics for tracks 4 and 5) is Howard's brother.
