= People (Howard Jones album) =

Studio album by Howard Jones
- Released: 14 July 1998
- Studios: Parr Street Studios (Liverpool, UK)
- Genres: Rock, pop
- Length: 63:27
- Label: Ark 21
- Producers: Andy Ross; Howard Jones; Robbie Bronnimann (Track 4)

Howard Jones chronology
Angels & Lovers (1997)	People (1998)	Perform.00 (2000)

Professional ratings
Review scores
Source	Rating
AllMusic	2.5/5 stars

People is officially Howard Jones's seventh album, released in 1998. After the US release on Ark 21 Records, People was a global release via Jones' own record label dtox. The album is a reworked version of the 1997 Japanese-only release Angels & Lovers. The title track and "When Lovers Confess" were deleted and three new tracks added: "Tomorrow Is Now", "Everything", and "Let the People Have Their Say". The album did not chart in the UK. However, the single "Let the People Have Their Say" broke the top 100 barrier in the UK and received ample air play on BBC Radio 2. The tri-fold slip case version features the faces of 210 people, all friends, family and fans of Jones.

To promote the album, a tour was organised. Jones' band consisted of former Kajagoogoo bassist Nick Beggs, guitarist Robin Boult and on drums the late Kevin Wilkinson who has played with China Crisis. Howard also toured the US with Culture Club and The Human League playing a host of hits and songs from the album in large arenas.

== Track listing ==
All tracks are written by Howard Jones and Andy Ross, except where noted.

No.	Title	Writer(s)	Length
1.	"You're the Buddha"		4:35
2.	"Tomorrow Is Now"	Jones, Jane Wiedlin, Dave Bassett	3:51
3.	"Everything"	Jones, Paul Jefferson, Swirl	3:48
4.	"Let the People Have Their Say"	Jones, Ross, William Deasy	4:24
5.	"If You Love"	Jones	4:37
6.	"Sleep My Angel"		4:31
7.	"We Make the Weather"	Jones, Ross, Roy Jones	5:16
8.	"Back in Your Life"		5:12
9.	"Wedding Song"	Jones, Ross, Roy Jones	4:41
10.	"Dreamin' On"		3:31
11.	"Let Me Be the First to Know"		5:15
12.	"Nothing to Fear"		6:55
13.	"Not One of the Lonely Tonight"		6:54

Track 4 has a different version on the European versions of this album. Roy Jones (co-writer of lyrics for tracks 7 and 9) is Howard's brother.

== Personnel ==
- Howard Jones – vocals, keyboards (1, 5–13), Apple Mac programming (1, 5–13), acoustic piano (2), Hammond organ (2, 3), electric piano (3), backing vocals (3)
- Robbie Bronnimann – keyboards (4), programming (4)
- Andy Ross – guitars (1, 5–13), tambourine (2), keyboards (4), programming (4), Apple Mac programming (6–13)
- Robin Boult – guitars (1, 2, 4, 5)
- Eric Gales – guitars (3)
- Pino Palladino – bass (1, 5)
- Keith Wilkinson – bass (2)
- Greg Wells – bass (3)
- Guy Richman – drums (1, 5)
- Kevin Wilkinson – drums (2)
- Stewart Copeland – drums (3)
- Luis Jardim – percussion (1, 5)
- Carol Steele – percussion (6–13)
- Kevin Robinson – flugelhorn (1), trumpet (1)
- Alfia Bekova – cello (4)
- David Hughes – cello (4)
- Andy Hunter – scratches (4)
- Katie Kissoon – backing vocals (1, 5)
- Sylvia Mason-James – backing vocals (1, 5)
- Beverley Skeete – backing vocals (1, 5)
- Paul Jefferson – backing vocals (3)
- Swirl 360 (Denny and Kenny Scott) – backing vocals (3)
- Woodlands Hospice Community Choir – choir (4)
- Tyndale Thomas – choir director (4)

== Production ==
- Howard Jones – producer, mixing (2)
- Andy Ross – producer, mixing (2, 4)
- Robbie Bronnimann – producer (4), mixing (4)
- Stephen W. Tayler – engineer (1, 5), mixing (1, 5)
- Avril Mackintosh – engineer (1, 2, 4–13), mixing (2)
- Bob Clearmountain – mixing (3, 6–13)
- Bob Ludwig – mastering at Gateway Mastering (Portland, Maine)
- Paul Ridout – artwork, design
- Simon Fowler – photography
- David Stopps – management for Friars Management
