= Working in the Backroom =

Studio album by Howard Jones
- Released: 1993
- Studio: The Shed (Maidenhead, England)
- Genre: Rock, pop
- Length: 50:52
- Label: Dtox
- Producer: Howard Jones; Andy Ross

Howard Jones chronology
The Best of Howard Jones (1993)	Working in the Backroom (1993)	Live Acoustic America (1996)

Working in the Backroom is the sixth album by the British pop musician Howard Jones. It was released in 1993, and was the first album to be released on Dtox Records, Jones's own label. Jones sold over 20,000 copies of the album at his shows. Jones's parents often helped him sell the copies. He supported the album with a North American solo tour designated "The Synthesizer Tour"; The Fat Lady Sings opened some of the shows.

== Production ==
Jones recorded and produced the album at his home studio. He spent about a year working on it.

== Critical reception ==
Professional ratings
Review scores
Source	Rating
The Encyclopedia of Popular Music	3/5 stars

The Washington Post wrote: "A collection of not-very-experimental experiments, the album sounds like mainstream Jones on such songs as 'Over & Above' and 'Left No Evidence'."

== Track listing ==
All tracks composed by Howard Jones; except where indicated.

1. "Cathedral of Chutai Excerpt" – 1:19
2. "Cookin' in the Kitchen" (Howard Jones, Andy Ross) – 4:58
3. "Over & Above" (Howard Jones, Andy Ross) – 4:48
4. "You Are Beautiful to Me" (Howard Jones, Andy Ross) – 4:52
5. "Left No Evidence" – 4:09
6. "You Can Say It's All Over" – 5:27
7. "Don't Get Me Wrong" – 7:10
8. "Blue" – 4:23
9. "Egypt Love Trance" – 5:20
10. "Let the Spirit Carry Me" – 4:17
11. "Cathedral of Chutai" – 4:05

== Personnel ==
- Howard Jones – vocals, keyboards, Macintosh computer
- Andy Ross – guitars, Macintosh computer
- Carol Steele – caxixi (5), congas (5)

=== Production ===
- Howard Jones – producer
- Andy Ross – producer
- Paul Ridout – art direction, photography
- David Stopps – management for Friars Management, Ltd.
