= One to One (Howard Jones album) =

Studio album by Howard Jones
- Released: 13 October 1986
- Recorded: 1985
- Studio: Windmill Lane (Dublin); The Farm (Chiddingfold, Surrey)
- Genre: Synth-pop
- Length: 49:54
- Label: Elektra
- Producer: Arif Mardin (tracks 1−10) Phil Collins and Hugh Padgham (track 11)

Howard Jones chronology
Action Replay (1986)	One to One (1986)	Cross That Line (1989)

Singles from One to One
- 1. "All I Want" Released: 22 September 1986; 2. "You Know I Love You... Don't You?" Released: 17 November 1986; 3. "Little Bit of Snow" Released: 2 March 1987

One to One is the third studio album by the English synth-pop musician Howard Jones, released on 13 October 1986 by Elektra Records. The album contains the singles "You Know I Love You... Don't You?" (US top twenty), "All I Want" (top 40 in many European countries) and "Little Bit of Snow" (top 75 in the UK). The CD release also contains the single version of "No One Is to Blame", a song included in its original form on Jones's previous studio album, Dream into Action (1985), which had been re-recorded and released as a single earlier in 1986. This version features Genesis' Phil Collins on drums and backing vocals. One to One reached number 10 on the UK Albums Chart.

== Critical reception ==
Professional ratings
Review scores
Source	Rating
AllMusic	2/5 stars
The Encyclopedia of Popular Music	2/5 stars
MusicHound Rock: The Essential Album Guide	2/5 stars
The Rolling Stone Album Guide	2.5/5 stars

The Rolling Stone Album Guide wrote that "Jones's songs take on a reflective cast, which neither helps their melodies nor enhances his singing." Trouser Press wrote that "the once-colorful elf has become part of a mainstream adult pop enterprise."

== Track listing ==
All tracks are written by Howard Jones.

No.	Title	Length
1.	"You Know I Love You... Don't You?"	4:05
2.	"The Balance of Love (Give and Take)"	4:29
3.	"All I Want"	4:37
4.	"Where Are We Going?"	5:01
5.	"Don't Want to Fight Anymore"	4:37
6.	"Step into These Shoes"	4:19
7.	"Will You Still Be There?"	4:45
8.	"Good Luck, Bad Luck"	4:14
9.	"Give Me Strength"	5:01
10.	"Little Bit of Snow"	4:30

CD bonus track
No.	Title	Length
11.	"No One Is to Blame" (Single Version)	4:13

== Personnel ==
- Howard Jones – vocals, keyboards, drum and percussion programming, sequencing
- Mike Roarty – Fairlight CMI
- Reb Beach – guitars
- Nick Moroch – guitars
- Phil Palmer – guitars
- Nile Rodgers – guitars
- Mo Foster – bass guitar
- Martin Jones (Howard's brother) – bass guitar
- Steve Ferrone – drums
- Trevor Morais – drums
- Phil Collins – drums (11), backing vocals (11)
- Gary Burton – vibraphone
- Bob Gay – brass section, alto saxophone
- Scott Gilman – brass section
- Kendall Crane – brass section
- Matthew Cornish – brass section
- Matt Molloy – flute, penny whistle
- Max Eastley – whirling instruments and the Arc
- Louise Lowry – tap dancing
- Arif Mardin – string arrangements (10)
- Gene Orloff – string concertmaster (10)
- Afrodiziak (Caron Wheeler, Claudia Fontaine, Naomi Thompson) – backing vocals
- Daramis Carbaugh – backing vocals
- Doris Eugenio – backing vocals
- Deborah Forman – backing vocals
- Marcus Miller – backing vocals
- Cindy Mizelle – backing vocals
- Mike Murphy – backing vocals
- Mark Stevens – backing vocals
- Fonzi Thornton – backing vocals
- Boys choir of St. Patrick's Cathedral, Dublin – backing vocals
- John Dexter – choir director and conductor

=== Production ===
Tracks 1−10

- Arif Mardin – producer
- Kevin Killen – engineer, Quality Control technician
- Eddie Garcia – assistant engineer (New York, NY)
- John Grimes – assistant engineer (Dublin, Ireland)
- Mike Roarty – Quality Control technician
- Recorded at Windmill Lane Studios (Dublin, Ireland).
- Mixed at Atlantic Studios (New York, NY).

Track 11

- Phil Collins – producer
- Hugh Padgham – producer, engineer
- Steve Chase – assistant engineer
- Paul Gomersall – assistant engineer
- Recorded at The Farm (Surrey, England).

Additional credits

- Chris Garnham – cover photography
- Simon Fowler – inside photography

== Charts ==
Chart (1986)	Peak position
Australian Albums (Kent Music Report)	65
Canadian Albums Chart	24
Dutch Albums (Album Top 100)	70
Swedish Albums (Sverigetopplistan)	27
UK Albums (OCC)	10
US Billboard 200	59

== Certifications ==
Region	Certification	Certified units/sales
United Kingdom (BPI)	Gold	100,000^{^}
^{^} Shipments figures based on certification alone.
