= In the Running =

Album by Howard Jones

Studio album by Howard Jones
- Released: 27 April 1992
- Recorded: September 1990 – September 1991
- Studio: The Shed (Maidenhead, England); A&M (Hollywood, California, USA)
- Genre: Pop rock
- Length: 51:04
- Label: Elektra (US); East West
- Producer: Ross Cullum; Howard Jones

Howard Jones chronology
Cross That Line (1989)	In the Running (1992)	The Best of Howard Jones (1993)

Singles from In the Running
- 1. "Lift Me Up" Released: 30 March 1992; 2. "Two Souls" Released: 1992; 3. "Tears to Tell" Released: 1992

In the Running is the fifth studio album by the English pop musician Howard Jones, released in 1992. It was his last original studio album recorded on the Warner/Elektra label. It contains the US Top 40 hit "Lift Me Up". An acoustic tour took place in 1992 with Howard on grand piano, accompanied by Carol Steele on percussion.

The album was remastered and released on CD (with a host of extra tracks) in 2012, with another reissue in 2021.

== Production ==
David Lindley and Midge Ure were among the guitar players who played on In the Running. Jones worked on the album for three years.

== Critical reception ==
Professional ratings
Review scores
Source	Rating
Boston Herald	B
Chicago Tribune	2/4 stars

Rolling Stone wrote: "If Jones once wrote catchy pop songs, he's now drifting into intricate orchestration, slick production and melodrama." The Chicago Tribune noted that "Jones aims for social statements as a catharsis for change, but the lyrical territory is well-trodden." The Washington Post deemed the album "mainstream, mid-tempo pop-rock."

== Track listing ==
All tracks composed by Howard Jones; except where indicated.

1. "Lift Me Up" (Jones, Ross Cullum) – 3:39
2. "Fallin' Away" (Jones, Ross Cullum, Lala) – 6:53
3. "Show Me" (Jones, Ross Cullum) – 4:32
4. "The Voices Are Back" – 5:32
5. "Exodus" – 4:32
6. "Tears to Tell" – 5:23
7. "Two Souls" (Jones, Andy Ross, Ross Cullum) – 4:23
8. "Gun Turned On the World" – 4:38
9. "One Last Try" – 4:11
10. "City Song" – 7:17

=== 2021 Remaster ===
Bonus tracks:

11. I. G. Y. (What A Beautiful World) (Single Mix)

12. New Man

13. Takin’ The Time

14. You Say

15. One Last Try (Edit)*

* Previously Unreleased

CD Two

1. Lift Me Up (Instrumental)*
2. Fallin’ Away (Instrumental)*
3. Show Me (Instrumental)*
4. The Voices Are Back (Instrumental)*
5. Exodus (Instrumental)*
6. Tears To Tell (Instrumental)*
7. Two Souls(Instrumental)*
8. Gun Turned On The World (Instrumental) (Extended Version)*
9. One Last Try (Instrumental) (Extended Version)*
10. City Song (Instrumental)*
11. I.G.Y. (What A Beautiful World) (Instrumental)*
12. Road To Cairo (TV Mix)*
13. Other People Are Us (TV Mix)*
14. What Is Love? (’93 Remix) (Instrumental)*

* Previously Unreleased

CD Three

1. What Is Love? (’93 12″ Remix Part 1)*
2. What Is Love? (’93 12″ Remix Part 2)*
3. Tears To Tell (7″ Edit)**
4. Don’t Be Part Of It
5. Road To Cairo (Andy Scarth Mix)**
6. I. G. Y. (What A Beautiful World) (Special Dj Edit)**
7. Other People Are Us
8. What Is Love? (’93 Remix)*
9. Two Souls (Early Extended Mix)*
10. Don’t Be Part Of It (Moo Mix)**
11. I. G. Y. (What A Beautiful World) (Live At The Spectrum Theatre, Philadelphia 1987)**
12. Road To Cairo**
13. Tears To Tell (Early Mix)*
14. One Last Try (Extended Version)*
15. Don’t Be Part Of It (Dance Mix Aka Dub Mix)**

* Previously Unreleased

** Previously Unreleased Remastered

DVD Four:

1. Interview With Howard Jones October 2020:

- Creating “In The Running”
- Track By Track Commentary

2. I.G.Y. (What A Beautiful World) (Pebble Mill – 18/05/1993)

3. What Is Love? (Pebble Mill – 18/05/1993)

4. Tears To Tell (Promo Video)

5. Lift Me Up (Promo Video)

6. I.G.Y. (What A Beautiful World) (Promo Video)

7. Tears To Tell (Blue Tint Version) (Promo Video)

== Personnel ==
- Howard Jones – vocals, acoustic piano, keyboards (1–4, 6–10), keyboard bass (1, 2, 4, 5, 7–10), keyboard guitar (1–4, 7, 8, 10), vocoder (5), organ (5, 6), backing vocals (5), bass guitar (6), drums (10)
- Jai Winding – additional keyboards (3, 7), Moog bass (3)
- Kevin Maloney – Synclavier editing (7)
- Ian Stanley – additional keyboards (8)
- Dean Parks – electric guitar (2), guitars (5), soft wah wah guitar (9)
- David Lindley – slide guitar (2), acoustic guitar (2)
- Steve Farris – guitars (3, 5, 7, 8)
- Neil Taylor – guitar solo (3)
- Robbie McIntosh – guitars (6)
- Midge Ure – "breakdown" guitar (7)
- Andy Ross – wah wah guitar (7), additional guitars (7), rhythm arrangements (7)
- Ross Cullum – drums (1–3, 10), guitar solo (9)
- Mark Brzezicki – additional percussion (2), additional drums (3)
- Chris Hughes – drums (4, 6, 8)
- Richie Hayward – drums (5, 7)
- Sam Clayton – tambourine (5)
- Luis Conte – percussion (7, 9)
- Kevin Robinson – trumpet (4)
- Clare Fischer – clarinet, choir and brass arrangements (9)
- Sooty Bonnet – blues mordents (1)
- Carol Kenyon – backing vocals (1, 2, 4–7), choir (10)
- Tessa Niles – backing vocals (1, 2, 4–7), choir (10)

Production

- Rupert Hine – executive producer
- Howard Jones – producer
- Ross Cullum – producer, recording
- Chad Munsey – assistant engineer
- Paul Corkett – additional engineer
- Andy Strange – additional engineer
- Steve Williams – additional engineer
- Arne Frager– engineer for Claire Fischer arrangements
- Bob Clearmountain – mixing at Mayfair Studios (London, England)
- Avril Mackintosh – mix assistant
- Bob Ludwig – mastering at Masterdisk (New York, NY)
- Janet Boye – art direction, design
- Daniel Miller – photography
