= All I Want (Howard Jones song) =

Single by Howard Jones

from the album One To One
- Released: 22 September 1986
- Genre: New wave
- Length: 4:38
- Label: WEA (UK); Elektra Records (US)
- Songwriter(s): Howard Jones
- Producer(s): Arif Mardin

Howard Jones singles chronology
| "No One Is to Blame" (1985) | "All I Want" (1986) | "You Know I Love You... Don't You?" (1986) |

"All I Want" is a single taken from Howard Jones's third studio album.

Released in September 1986 in the UK as the lead single from the album One to One, it reached #35 in the UK Singles Chart, his lowest charting hit to that time, and the last UK top 40 hit of Jones' career on the Official Singles Chart, although You Know I Love You... Don't You? from 1986 and 1989's Lift Me Up both went top 40 on the rival Network Chart.

In the United States, it was the third single from the album, and reached #76 on the Billboard Hot 100 chart. As was the case in the UK, it was the lowest charting US hit of Jones' career to that time.

The track was more successful in some European territories, reaching top twenty in Ireland and top five in Sweden.

== Critical reception ==
William Shaw of Smash Hits welcomed Jones return. He priced "slightly electro-ish" and "harder" new sound and called the song as a best "he's ever written."

== Track listing ==
All tracks written by Jones.

- UK release

7"

- "All I Want" – 4:38
- "Roll Right Up" – 4:49

12"

- "All I Want (Extended Version)" – 6:15
- "Roll Right Up" – 4:48
- "Don’t Want To Fight Anymore" – 4:32
- US release

7"

- "All I Want" – 4:38
- "Dig This Well Deep" – 4:34

12"

- "All I Want (Extended Version)" – 6:23
- "You Know I Love You... Don’t You? (Live)" – 3:09
- "All I Want (Edit)" – 4:07
- "Hide & Seek (Orchestral)" – 7:09

== Chart positions ==
| Chart (1986) | Peak position |
|---|---|
| Australia (Kent Music Report) | 83 |
| Ireland Singles Chart | 13 |
| Italian Singles Chart | 26 |
| UK Singles Chart | 35 |
| US Billboard Hot 100 | 76 |
