= Cross That Line =

Studio album by Howard Jones
- Released: 20 March 1989
- Recorded: 1988
- Studio: The Shed (Maidenhead, Berkshire); The Wool Hall (Beckington, Somerset)
- Genre: Synth-pop
- Length: 48:26
- Label: Elektra (US)/WEA
- Producer: Howard Jones; Chris Hughes; Ross Cullum; Ian Stanley

Howard Jones chronology
One to One (1986)	Cross That Line (1989)	In the Running (1992)

Singles from Cross That Line
- 1. "Everlasting Love" Released: 20 February 1989; 2. "The Prisoner" Released: 22 May 1989

Professional ratings
Review scores
Source	Rating
AllMusic	2.5/5 stars
Stereo Review	(very good)

Cross That Line is the fourth studio album by the English synth-pop musician Howard Jones, released on 20 March 1989 by Elektra Records. It featured two hit singles "Everlasting Love" (No. 12 US) and "The Prisoner" (No. 30 US), though neither of these singles nor the album itself were successful in Jones's native UK.

The album was produced by Jones with Ian Stanley, Chris Hughes, and Ross Cullum.

The track "Powerhouse" was remixed by Danny D and released to clubs.

The album was remastered and released on CD (with extra tracks) in 2012.

== Track listing ==
All tracks are written by Howard Jones.

1. "The Prisoner" – 4:38
2. "Everlasting Love" – 4:16
3. "Powerhouse" – 3:26
4. "Last Supper" – 5:18
5. "Cross That Line" – 4:42
6. "Out of Thin Air" – 3:07
7. "Guardians of the Breath" – 7:34
8. "Fresh Air Waltz" – 3:59
9. "Wanders to You" – 5:08
10. "Those Who Move Clouds" – 5:46

== Personnel ==
- Howard Jones – vocals, keyboards (1, 2, 4, 7, 10), Fairlight CMI guitar (3, 5, 7), Hammond organ (3, 8), drums (4, 8, 10), acoustic piano (5, 6, 8), flute solo (5), body samples (7), Fairlight CMI strings (8)
- Ian Stanley – keyboards (1, 2)
- Mike Roarty – Fairlight CMI operator (1, 2, 4–10)
- Andy Ross – guitars (1, 2)
- Martin Jones (Howard's brother) – guitars (2), Wal bass (5–9), electric guitar (8)
- Phil Palmer – electric guitar (3, 5, 9), acoustic guitar (4)
- Frédéric "Steg" Stegner – EBow guitar (7)
- Chris Hughes – drums (1, 2)
- Trevor Morais – drums (3, 5, 9)
- Danny D – drum programming (3)
- Simon Clarke – alto saxophone (3, 5, 9), flute (5, 9)
- Tim Sanders – tenor saxophone (3, 5, 9); soprano saxophone (5, 9) and solo (9)
- Peter Thoms – trombone (9)
- Roddy Lorimer – trumpet (3, 5), flugelhorn solo (5), flugelhorn (9)
- Steve Sidwell – trumpet (3)
- Alan Hewitt – chainsaw (7)
- Sandy McLelland – additional vocals (2)
- Inga Humpe – vocals (3)
- Claudia Fontaine – backing vocals (5)
- Osheen Jones (Howard's son) – laughter (10)

== Production ==
- Ross Cullum – producer (1, 2), recording (1, 2)
- Chris Hughes – producer (1, 2), recording (1, 2)
- Ian Stanley – producer (1, 2), recording (1, 2)
- Howard Jones – producer (3–10), arrangements
- Mike Roarty – recording (1, 2, 4–10), mixing (1, 2, 4–10)
- Johnny D – mixing (3)
- Andy Scarth – drum recording (3, 5, 9)
- Denis Blackman – mastering at Tape One Studios (London, UK)
- Simon Fowler – back cover photography, inner sleeve photography
- Brian Griffin – front cover photography

== Charts ==
Chart (1989)	Peak position
Australian Albums (Kent Music Report)	97
Billboard Canadian Albums	43
UK Albums (Official Charts)	64
US Billboard 200	65
