= Ordinary Heroes (album) =

Studio album by Howard Jones
- Released: 9 November 2009
- Genre: Pop
- Length: 41:57
- Label: DTox
- Producer: Robbie Bronnimann

Howard Jones chronology
Live in Birkenhead (2007)	Ordinary Heroes (2009)	Engage (2015)

Professional ratings
Review scores
Source	Rating
AllMusic	2.5/5 stars

Ordinary Heroes is the ninth studio album by the English pop musician Howard Jones, released on 9 November 2009. A simpler album production than the previous release Revolution of the Heart was present here. Strings and piano dominate, and while there are some upbeat tracks, the album has a mellow, mature atmosphere. Some of the tracks were performed with the Morrison Orpheus Choir in St David's Hall in Cardiff at a special one-off gig.

== Track listing ==
- Standard Version
1. "Straight Ahead" (Howard Jones, Cori Josias) – 4:13
2. "Say It Like You Mean It" (Jones, Josias) – 3:35
3. "Someone You Need" (Jones, Duncan Sheik, Martha Schuyler Thompson) – 3:31
4. "Collective Heartbeat" (Jones) – 3:48
5. "Fight On" (Jones) – 4:06
6. "Even If I Don't Say" (Jones, Josias) – 3:50
7. "Ordinary Heroes" (Jones, Josias) – 4:33
8. "You Knew Us So Well" (Jones) – 4:55
9. "Love Never Wasted" (Jones) – 4:48
10. "Soon You'll Go" (Jones, Josias) – 4:38

A limited edition 2CD pack was sold exclusively by Jones' website. The second disc included piano and vocal versions of each track from the standard album, plus two additional songs.

- Bonus Disc
1. "Straight Ahead"
2. "Say It Like You Mean It"
3. "Someone You Need"
4. "Collective Heartbeat"
5. "Fight On"
6. "Even If I Don't Say"
7. "Ordinary Heroes"
8. "You Knew Us So Well"
9. "Love Never Wasted"
10. "Soon You'll Go"
11. "Your Heart Has Won" (Jones) - 3:47
12. "Love Never Wasted (Revisited)" - 4:57

== Personnel ==
- Howard Jones – vocals, Steinway piano, musical arrangements, string arrangements
- Robin Boult – guitars
- Martin Cohen – bass
- Jonathan Atkinson – drums
- Vicky Matthews – cello
- Racheal Robson – viola
- Deborah White – 1st violin
- Natalia Bonner – 2nd violin
- Ty Unwin – additional strings on "Soon You'll Go"
- Fiona Brice – string arrangements, conductor
- Daniel Pierce – backing vocals
- Morriston Orpheus Choir – choir on "Soon You'll Go"
- Joy Amman Davies – choir conductor

== Production ==
- Produced, recorded and mixed by Robbie Bronniman.
- Recorded at Robot Studios and Level View Studio (Somerset, England).
- Strings recorded by Matthew Lawrence at Assault & Battery and Metropolis Studio (London, England).
- Choir recorded by Stephen W. Taylor in Swansea, Wales.
- Album Artwork – Hush Creative
