= Human's Lib =

1984 debut studio album by Howard Jones

Studio album by Howard Jones
- Released: 9 March 1984
- Recorded: June 1983 ("New Song"); October–November 1983
- Studios: Farmyard (Little Chalfont, Buckinghamshire); Chipping Norton (Oxfordshire; "New Song")
- Genre: Synth-pop
- Length: 42:58
- Labels: WEA; Elektra
- Producers: Rupert Hine; Colin Thurston ("New Song")

Howard Jones chronology
Human's Lib (1984)	The 12″ Album (1984)

Singles from Human's Lib
- 1. "New Song" Released: 19 August 1983; 2. "What Is Love?" Released: 18 November 1983; 3. "Hide and Seek" Released: 10 February 1984; 4. "Pearl in the Shell" Released: 18 May 1984

Human's Lib is the debut studio album by the English synth-pop musician Howard Jones. It was released on 9 March 1984 and entered the UK Albums Chart at the No. 1 spot, spending a total of 57 weeks on the charts. The album has been certified double platinum by the BPI for sales in excess of 600,000 copies.

Four songs from the album were released as singles in the UK, all of which reached the top 20 on the UK singles chart: "New Song" peaked at #3, "What Is Love?" at #2, "Hide and Seek" at #12, and "Pearl in the Shell" at #7. "New Song" and "What Is Love?" also charted on the US Billboard Hot 100 in the US, both reaching the top 40.

"Equality" was released as a single only in South Africa, as a commentary about the policy of apartheid there at the time.

== Critical reception ==
Professional ratings
Review scores
Source	Rating
AllMusic	4.5/5 stars
God Is in the TV	9/10
Number One	3/5
Record Collector	4/5 stars
Record Mirror	3.5/5 stars
Rolling Stone	2/5 stars
The Rolling Stone Album Guide	3/5 stars
Smash Hits	6 1/2/10
Sounds	2/5 stars
The Village Voice	C−

Contemporary reviews of Human's Lib were generally negative, with many criticising the songs' music and lyrics as being lightweight. In Melody Maker, Colin Irwin called Jones "the aural equivalent of painting by numbers" and said that although the sentiments expressed in the lyrics were worthy ones, "his sermons are embarrassingly glib". Irwin stated that only "Hide and Seek" and the title track were passable songs, and that overall "this is very shallow pop music dressed as something much more important and profound". Don Watson of NME wrote, "It's as hard to distinguish his music as it is to distinguish it from your carpet; conveniently, though, the lyrics are printed on the inner sleeve so that we may fully appreciate the complete lack of any novel observation in the songs ... What's so amusing about Jones' songwriting is the glib manner in which he brandishes threadbare platitudes as unique insights." In Sounds, David Tibet called Human's Lib "an LP of simple/simplistic electronic-pop tunes, irretrievably lightweight, that offer nothing new except more music to tap your feet and grin inanely to". He stated that it was "not an offensive record at all", but that "people should ask for something more demanding than aural air conditioning".

In the US, Christopher Connelly of Rolling Stone stated that Jones "simply doesn't demonstrate the imagination or songwriting skill to produce anything truly memorable", and that "too often, his compositions are poor pastiches of already overworked synth exercises". Robert Christgau of The Village Voice panned Human's Lib as a "revolving self-help manual" marred by Jones' "ressentiment" and unadorned synth-pop.

More positive reviews came from Betty Page in Record Mirror, who said the album provided "lashings of beaty, intensely danceable chunks of electropop alternated with sincere and heartfelt one-man-and-his-piano ballads. And to a point, he does it very well ... for an occupier of the Middle Earth of chart pop, he's quite a grower, if not a wrencher of guts", and from Neil Tennant in Smash Hits, who commented that Jones had "a neat talent for writing melodic pop songs with clever hooks and real 1970s singer-songwriter lyrics. A must for all Supertramp fans."

In a retrospective review, Stephen Thomas Erlewine of AllMusic found that Human's Lib, with its "state-of-the-art" synth-pop sound and songs about "the power of positive thinking" and "universal love", possesses "an appealing dichotomy: underneath his electronics and stylish haircut, he's singing about subjects better suited to acoustic guitars and tie-dyed T-shirts." "Still," Erlewine continued, "Human's Lib benefits from Jones' complete immersion in synths, giving the album a glimmering sheen that remains emblematic of the dawn of MTV." God Is in the TV's Andy Page called it "a masterclass in pop-with-a-conscience", while in Record Collector, Joel McIver reflected on the album's negative reception from critics upon release, writing, "as ever, they (we) knew nothing because it sounds killer all these years later".

== Track listing ==
All tracks are written and composed by Howard Jones, unless indicated otherwise. Track timings are taken from the original UK LP edition.

Side one
No.	Title	Writer(s)	Length
1.	"Conditioning"	music: Jones, lyrics: Bill Bryant	4:32
2.	"What Is Love?"	music: Jones, lyrics: Bryant, Jones	3:45
3.	"Pearl in the Shell"		4:03
4.	"Hide and Seek"		5:34
5.	"Hunt the Self"	music: Jones, lyrics: Bryant, Jones	3:42

Side two
No.	Title	Writer(s)	Length
6.	"New Song"		4:15
7.	"Don't Always Look at the Rain"		4:13
8.	"Equality"	music: Jones, lyrics: Bryant, Jones	4:26
9.	"Natural"	music: Jones, lyrics: Bryant	4:25
10.	"Human's Lib"	music: Jones, lyrics: Bryant	4:03
Total length:			42:58

- Many CD editions substitute a 6:32 mix of "What Is Love?" (identical to the extended mix from the 12-inch single except that the vocal echo at 2:52 is missing) for the 3:45 album version and add "China Dance", an instrumental B-side from the "Hide and Seek" single, as a bonus track (track 11).
- In May 2024, Cherry Red Records released new special edition versions of both Human's Lib and the follow-up album, Dream into Action (1985) as CD + Blu-ray packages. The releases feature new mixes of the albums by Stephen W. Tayler. The Blu-ray contains both 5.1 DTS HD Master Audio and 96/24 LPCM stereo versions by Tayler, plus Dolby Atmos versions of "What Is Love?", "Hide and Seek" and "New Song" (Farmyard version) mixed by Bob Clearmountain.

== Personnel ==
- Howard Jones – synthesizers, keyboards, vocals, drum machines
- Davey Payne – saxophone on "Pearl in the Shell"
- Stephen W. Tayler – engineer, mixing; saxophone on "Pearl in the Shell"
- Ben Rogan – assistant engineer
- Colin Thurston – producer and engineer on "New Song"
- Rupert Hine – producer on all other tracks; uncredited backing vocal on "What Is Love"
- Simon Fowler – photography
- Steg – artwork

== Equipment used ==
Howard Jones used the following equipment on Human's Lib:

- Roland Jupiter-8
- Roland Juno-60
- Yamaha DX7 (×2)
- Sequential Circuits Pro-One
- Sequential Circuits Prophet T8 – MIDI'd to two DX7s
- Moog Prodigy
- Memorymoog
- Roland TR-808 drum machine
- E-mu Drumulator drum machine
- Simmons SDSV drum module with SDS6 sequencer
- LinnDrum – owned by Rupert Hine

Various drum sounds replaced with real drum samples from an AMS DMX 15-80S digital delay.

== Charts ==
=== Weekly charts ===
Chart (1983–1984)	Peak position
Australian Albums (Kent Music Report)	68
Canadian Albums (RPM)	18
Dutch Albums (Album Top 100)	15
German Albums (Offizielle Top 100)	8
New Zealand Albums (RMNZ)	21
Norwegian Albums (VG-lista)	13
Swedish Albums (Sverigetopplistan)	5
Swiss Albums (Schweizer Hitparade)	12
UK Albums (Official Charts)	1
US Billboard 200	59

=== Year-end charts ===
Chart (1984)	Position
Canadian Albums (RPM)	68
German Albums (Offizielle Top 100)	31
UK Albums (Gallup)	16

== Certifications ==
Region	Certification	Certified units/sales
Canada (Music Canada)	Gold	50,000^{^}
United Kingdom (BPI)	2× Platinum	600,000^{^}
^{^} Shipments figures based on certification alone.
