= The Very Best of Howard Jones =

Greatest hits album by Howard Jones
- Released: 2003
- Genre: Rock, pop
- Length: Disc One: 74:29; Disc Two: 79:22
- Label: Dtox
- Producer: Various

Howard Jones chronology
Piano Solos (for Friends and Loved Ones) (2002)	The Very Best of Howard Jones (2003)	Revolution of the Heart (2005)

The Very Best of Howard Jones is a collection of Howard Jones's biggest hits between 1983 and 2003. It also contains one new track, "Revolution Of The Heart", in its original form. It would later be altered and featured on his 2005 album, Revolution Of The Heart. The Very Best of Howard Jones also came with a bonus disc of B-sides. The two-disc set featuring 36 synth-pop hits includes "New Song," "Everlasting Love," and the Phil Collins-produced version of "No One Is To Blame."

== Track listing ==
=== Disc one ===
1. "Revolution Of The Heart" – 4:10
2. "What Is Love?" – 3:41
3. "No One Is To Blame" – 4:12
4. "Like To Get To Know You Well" – 4:00
5. "Lift Me Up" – 3:40
6. "You Know I Love You...Don't You?" – 4:04
7. "The Prisoner" – 4:41
8. "Everlasting Love" – 4:20
9. "Things Can Only Get Better" – 3:56
10. "All I Want" – 4:35
11. "Life In One Day" – 3:38
12. "Let The People Have Their Say" – 4:22
13. "Hide And Seek" – 4:49
14. "Don't Always Look At The Rain" – 4:13
15. "Blue" – 4:21
16. "New Song" – 4:15
17. "Tomorrow Is Now" – 3:52
18. "Someone You Need" – 3:31

=== Disc two ===
1. "Change the Man" – 4:29
2. "It Just Doesn't Matter" – 3:36
3. "Tao Te Ching" – 3:51
4. "Law Of The Jungle" – 3:18
5. "Bounce Right Back (Cause + Effect Mix)" – 7:29
6. "Learning How To Love" – 5:19
7. "Boom Bap Respite" – 2:47
8. "The Chase" – 2:53
9. "Roll Right Up" – 4:48
10. "Dig This Well Deep" – 4:34
11. "Let It Flow" – 3:46
12. "Brutality Of Fact" – 4:27
13. "Power Of The Media" – 4:46
14. "Rubber Morals" – 4:19
15. "New Man" – 5:53
16. "What Can I Say?" – 5:07
17. "Don't Put These Curses On Me" – 3:38
18. "Modern Man" – 4:13
