= Everlasting Love (Howard Jones song) =

Single by Howard Jones

from the album Cross That Line
- B-side: "The Brutality of Fact"
- Released: 20 February 1989
- Genre: Synthpop; dance-pop
- Length: 4:16
- Label: WEA (UK); Elektra (US)
- Songwriter: Howard Jones
- Producers: Chris Hughes; Ross Cullum; Ian Stanley

Howard Jones singles chronology
"Little Bit of Snow" (1987)	"Everlasting Love" (1989)	"The Prisoner" (1989)

"Everlasting Love" is a song by English singer and songwriter Howard Jones from his fourth studio album, Cross That Line (1989). Written by Jones, it was released as the album's first single on 20 February 1989.

The song reached No. 12 in the United States on the Billboard Hot 100 chart in the early summer of that year, and also peaked at No. 19 on the Modern Rock Tracks chart, the first of only two singles to appear there. It also spent two weeks at No. 1 on the US Adult Contemporary chart, the singer's second chart-topper on this tally (following "No One Is to Blame" from 1986). In Canada, it was the highest-charting single of his entire career, peaking at No. 3. In his native UK, where Jones had enjoyed numerous pop hits, "Everlasting Love" failed to have as much of an impact as earlier singles, stalling at No. 62 on the UK Singles Chart. The song was co-produced by ex-Tears for Fears band member Ian Stanley.

== Track listing ==
7" & cassette

1. "Everlasting Love" – 4:20
2. "The Brutality of Fact" – 4:27

12"

1. "Everlasting Love (808 Mix)" – 6:28
2. "Everlasting Love" – 4:20
3. "The Brutality of Fact" – 4:27
4. "Power of the Media" – 4:47

3" CD

1. "Everlasting Love" – 4:20
2. "The Brutality of Fact" – 4:27
3. "Power of the Media" – 4:47
4. "No One Is to Blame" – 4:13

Limited Edition 3" CD

1. "Everlasting Love (The Institute Mix)" – 4:48
2. "Hide and Seek (Orchestral)" – 7:09
3. "Conditioning (Live in Philadelphia)" – 5:26

== Charts ==
=== Weekly charts ===
Chart (1989)	Peak position
Australian Singles Chart	91
Canada (RPM)	3
Italy Airplay (Music & Media)	10
UK Singles Chart	62
US Billboard Hot 100	12
US Adult Contemporary	1
US Modern Rock Tracks	19

=== Year-end charts ===
Chart (1989)	Position
Canada Top Singles (RPM)	61

== Personnel ==
- Howard Jones – vocals; keyboards
- Ian Stanley – keyboards
- Chris Hughes – drums
- Andy Ross – guitar
- Martin Jones – guitar
- Sandy McLelland – additional vocals
