= Hide and Seek (Howard Jones song) =

Single by Howard Jones

from the album Human's Lib
- Released: 10 February 1984
- Recorded: 1983
- Studio: Farmyard (Little Chalfont, Buckinghamshire)
- Length: 4:49
- Label: WEA
- Songwriter: Howard Jones
- Producer: Rupert Hine

Howard Jones singles chronology
"What Is Love?" (1983)	"Hide and Seek" (1984)	"Pearl in the Shell" (1984)

Music video
- "Hide and Seek" on YouTube

"Hide and Seek" is a song by the English synth-pop musician Howard Jones, released on 10 February 1984 by WEA Records as the third single from his debut studio album, Human's Lib. It reached the top five in Ireland and peaked at number 12 on the UK singles chart. Musically, the song is darker than other songs by Jones, featuring an eerie gothic-tinged sound that is comparable to dark ambient. The song has been covered by many artists, including a version by the German band Gregorian on their fifth studio album Masters of Chant Chapter IV (2003). A re-recorded, longer version of the song was released on the album Perform.00 by Jones in 2000.

== Background ==
When writing "Hide and Seek", Jones was inspired by the work of Alan Watts, particularly on his views of life and death. Jones recalled reading a book from Watts that discussed the concept of explaining the concept of God to a child from the paradigm of Eastern philosophy. He described "Hide and Seek" as a "very spiritual song" about being interconnected with the world. In a 2024 interview, Jones said that "Hide and Seek" was "even more relevant now because of where we are as a world. It's very easy to give up on things and resign yourself to doom, but it's very important to feel hopeful and positive about the future. That song is definitely about hope."

Jones performed a solo acoustic version of the song at the 1985 Live Aid benefit concert. He reflected in 2015 that it was "very fortunate" that he picked that song to perform and said that it was a "wonderful feeling" when the audience joined in to sing parts of the chorus.

== Track listing ==
The B-sides, "Tao Te Ching" and "China Dance", are both instrumentals. All tracks were written by Jones.

7"

1. "Hide and Seek" – 4:49
2. "Tao Te Ching" – 3:52

12"

1. "Hide and Seek" (long version) – 8:30
2. "Tao Te Ching" – 3:52
3. "China Dance" – 3:50

UK limited edition 10"

1. "Hide and Seek" (concert version)
2. "Hide and Seek" – 4:49
3. "Tao Te Ching" – 3:52

UK limited edition 7" square shaped picture disc

1. "Hide and Seek" (long version) – 8:30
2. "Tao Te Ching" – 3:52
3. "China Dance" – 3:50

== Charts ==
=== Weekly charts ===
Chart (1984)	Peak position
Belgium (Ultratop 50 Flanders)	38
Germany (GfK)	38
Ireland (IRMA)	5
Netherlands (Single Top 100)	32
UK Singles (OCC)	12

=== Year-end charts ===
Chart (1984)	Position
UK Singles (Gallup)	89
