= New Song (Howard Jones song) =

- 7" single sleeve

Single by Howard Jones

from the album Human's Lib
- Released: 19 August 1983
- Recorded: 1983
- Studio: Chipping Norton (Oxfordshire)
- Genre: New wave; disco-pop; synth-pop
- Length: 4:16
- Label: WEA
- Songwriter: Howard Jones
- Producer: Colin Thurston

Howard Jones singles chronology
"New Song" (1983)	"What Is Love?" (1983)

Music video
- "New Song" on YouTube

"New Song" is the debut single by the English synth-pop musician Howard Jones, released on 19 August 1983 by WEA Records. It reached number 3 on the UK singles chart, spending 20 weeks in the top 75 and becoming the 28th best-selling single of 1983 in the UK. On the UK seven-inch single, the song's lyrics are printed in a spiral on the A-side label, with all the credits printed on the B-side. It was released in the US in early 1984, peaking at number 27 on the Billboard Hot 100 chart. The track later appeared on Jones' debut studio album Human's Lib (1984).

== Background ==
Howard Jones said, "In 'New Song', I wanted a song that was like my manifesto, like why I wanted to be in the business and why I wanted to write songs in the first place. I was working in the factory at the time—I was doing the gigs at night and I was working in the factory. And I wanted to say to people, 'You can. It is possible to do what you really want to do if you've got enough guts and determination. You can do what you're really good at in this life if you set your mind to it.' And so really that's what that song's about. It's about letting go of fear and seeing both sides of an argument and throwing off the things that hold you back mentally."

The single's B-side was titled "Change the Man". The twelve-inch single featured an extended version of "New Song" together with "Change the Man" and the original studio version of "Conditioning", which would be re-recorded for Human's Lib. "New Song" itself was later re-recorded for The 12″ Album (1984), in a version denoted "new version". This featured a lot of multi-layered piano, in contrast to the austere synthesiser sound of the original seven and twelve-inch versions.

Equipment used for the song includes a Roland Juno-60 synthesiser, Memorymoog synthesiser, and an E-mu Drumulator drum machine.

BBC Radio 1 DJ Mike Read refused to play "New Song", suggesting it was too similar to the 1977 song "Solsbury Hill" by Peter Gabriel of Genesis. When asked about the similarity in a 2011 interview, Jones denied using "Solsbury Hill" as inspiration:

No, there might have been a subconscious influence and I've always been a massive fan of Peter's... I mean there's always something you can compare things to, but there was no conscious influence.

== Music video ==
The music video opens at a pickle plant, where Jones's character works as a caretaker. As the owner arrives on the site, Jones strips off his uniform coveralls and begins to sing to his colleagues. One of them, a man wearing black and white theatrical make-up, (Note: Mime artist and regular live and video collaborator Jed Hoile.) removes his coveralls and begins to dance through the plant. As the boss begins to sweep the floor, Jones, the dancer, and several employees pile into his luxury car and drive away. Jones and the dancer next visit an Underground station (specifically Holborn tube station) to perform for the patrons, then visit a window cleaner and get him to take a break from his work. Finally, the two arrive at a school and interrupt a class of unruly students, who follow them outside to play on the grass, followed by their teacher.

== Track listings ==
7" vinyl (UK)

1. "New Song" (Howard Jones) – 4:16
2. "Change the Man" (Jones) – 4:30

7" vinyl (US)

1. "New Song" (Jones) – 4:16
2. "Conditioning" (Jones, Bill Bryant) – 4:02

12" vinyl

1. "New Song" (extended mix) (Jones) – 5:21
2. "Change the Man" (Jones) – 4:30
3. "Conditioning" (Jones, Bryant) – 4:55

== Charts ==
Chart (1983–1984)	Peak position
Australia (Kent Music Report)	60
Canada (The Record)	16
Germany (GfK)	19
Ireland (IRMA)	3
Sweden (Sverigetopplistan)	10
Switzerland (Schweizer Hitparade)	15
UK Singles (OCC)	3
US Billboard Hot 100	27
