= You Know I Love You... Don't You? =

Single by Howard Jones

from the album One to One
- B-side: "Roll Right Up"
- Released: October 1986 (US); 17 November 1986 (UK)
- Genre: New wave, pop
- Length: 4:04
- Label: WEA (UK); Elektra Records (US)
- Songwriter(s): Howard Jones
- Producer(s): Arif Mardin

Howard Jones singles chronology
"All I Want" (1985)	"You Know I Love You... Don't You?" (1986)	"Little Bit of Snow" (1987)

"You Know I Love You... Don't You?" was a single from Howard Jones's third studio album One to One. It was his first single not to enter the UK Top 40, peaking at #43, although it did reach #34 in the rival Network Chart. It fared much better in the US reaching #17 in the Billboard Hot 100 chart.

== Track listing ==
All tracks were written by Jones.

=== UK release ===
7"

- "You Know I Love You... Don't You?" – 4:04
- "Dig This Well Deep" – 4:33

12"

- "You Know I Love You... Don't You?" (Dance in the Fields Mix) – 7:19
- "Dig This Well Deep" - 4:34
- "You Know I Love You... Don't You?" (instrumental) – 5:58

NOTE: A limited edition double pack was available in both 7" and 12" format, which included a single-sided bonus disc featuring the song

- "Hide & Seek (Orchestral)"

=== US release ===
7"

- "You Know I Love You... Don't You?" – 4:04
- "Dig This Well Deep" – 4:33

12"

- "You Know I Love You... Don't You?" (Dance in the Fields Mix) – 7:19
- "You Know I Love You... Don't You?" (instrumental) – 5:58
- "You Know I Love You... Don't You?" (edited version) – 3:45
- "Roll Right Up" – 4:45
