= What Is Love? (Howard Jones song) =

Single by Howard Jones

from the album Human's Lib
- B-side: "It Just Doesn't Matter"
- Released: 18 November 1983
- Studio: Farmyard (Little Chalfont, Buckinghamshire)
- Genre: Synth-pop
- Length: 3:41 (single version); 6:36 (extended version)
- Label: WEA
- Songwriters: Howard Jones; Bill Bryant
- Producer: Rupert Hine

Howard Jones singles chronology
| "New Song" (1983) | "What Is Love?" (1983) | "Hide and Seek" (1984) |

Music video
- "What Is Love?" on YouTube

"What Is Love?" is a song by the English synth-pop musician Howard Jones, released on 18 November 1983 by WEA Records as the second single from his debut studio album, Human's Lib (1984). It reached number 2 on the UK singles chart, becoming Jones' highest chart placing to date. In the US, it peaked at number 33 on the Billboard Hot 100.

The song was originally entitled "Love?" on the demo tape which Howard Jones recorded in 1982, which itself was available at his gigs. Jones also used the question mark motif around this time on posters advertising his gigs; posters which also hung behind him on stage at his early 1980s Marquee Club appearances and which read simply "Howard Jones?".

== Background ==
Howard Jones said, "I didn't want to write songs about, 'I love you, baby, you've hurt me and I'm sad.' I didn't want to write songs about co-dependency. If I was going to write about love, I wanted to say what do we mean by love? What is it, really? You can't be dependent upon another person for your happiness. So you'd better question this idea of romantic love pretty soon, otherwise you're going to be pretty miserable. So that's really what that song is."

== Music video ==
The music video for "What Is Love?" was filmed in Paris, France, and features Jones walking around the city and a park.

== Personnel ==
Credits sourced from One Two Testing and Electricity Club

- Howard Jones – lead and backing vocals, Yamaha DX7, SCI Prophet T-8, Roland Juno-60 and Moog Prodigy synthesizers, E-mu Drumulator programming
- Rupert Hine – backing vocals

== Track listing ==
- 7"
1. "What Is Love?" (Howard Jones, Bill Bryant) – 3:41
2. "It Just Doesn't Matter" (Jones, Bryant) – 3:36
- 12"
1. "What Is Love?" (extended version) (Jones, Bryant) – 6:33
2. "It Just Doesn't Matter" (Jones, Bryant) – 4:30
3. "Hunt the Self" (live at the Marquee) (Jones, Bryant) – 5:36
- Limited edition 12"

A limited edition pack was also released featuring the standard 12-inch single and a "Live at the Marquee" bonus 7-inch single which featured the tracks:

1. "What Can I Say" (Jones, Bryant) – 5:10
2. "Bounce Right Back" (Jones) – 5:23
- Demo tape
1. "What Can I Say"
2. "Always Asking Questions"
3. "Human's Lib"
4. "Love?" (a.k.a. "What Is Love?")
5. "Risk"

== Charts ==
=== Weekly charts ===
| Chart (1983–1984) | Peak position |
|---|---|
| Australia (Kent Music Report) | 31 |
| Belgium (Ultratop 50 Flanders) | 16 |
| Canada Top Singles (RPM) | 49 |
| France (IFOP) | 80 |
| Germany (GfK) | 6 |
| Ireland (IRMA) | 3 |
| Norway (VG-lista) | 10 |
| Sweden (Sverigetopplistan) | 10 |
| Switzerland (Schweizer Hitparade) | 24 |
| UK Singles (Official Charts) | 2 |
| US Billboard Hot 100 | 33 |
| US Cashbox | 35 |

=== Year-end charts ===
| Chart (1984) | Position |
|---|---|
| Germany (Official German Charts) | 68 |
| UK Singles (Gallup) | 76 |

== Certifications ==
| Region | Certification | Certified units/sales |
|---|---|---|
| United Kingdom (BPI) | Silver | 250,000^{^} |
^{^} Shipments figures based on certification alone.
