= Howard Jones (British musician) =

British musician (born 1955)

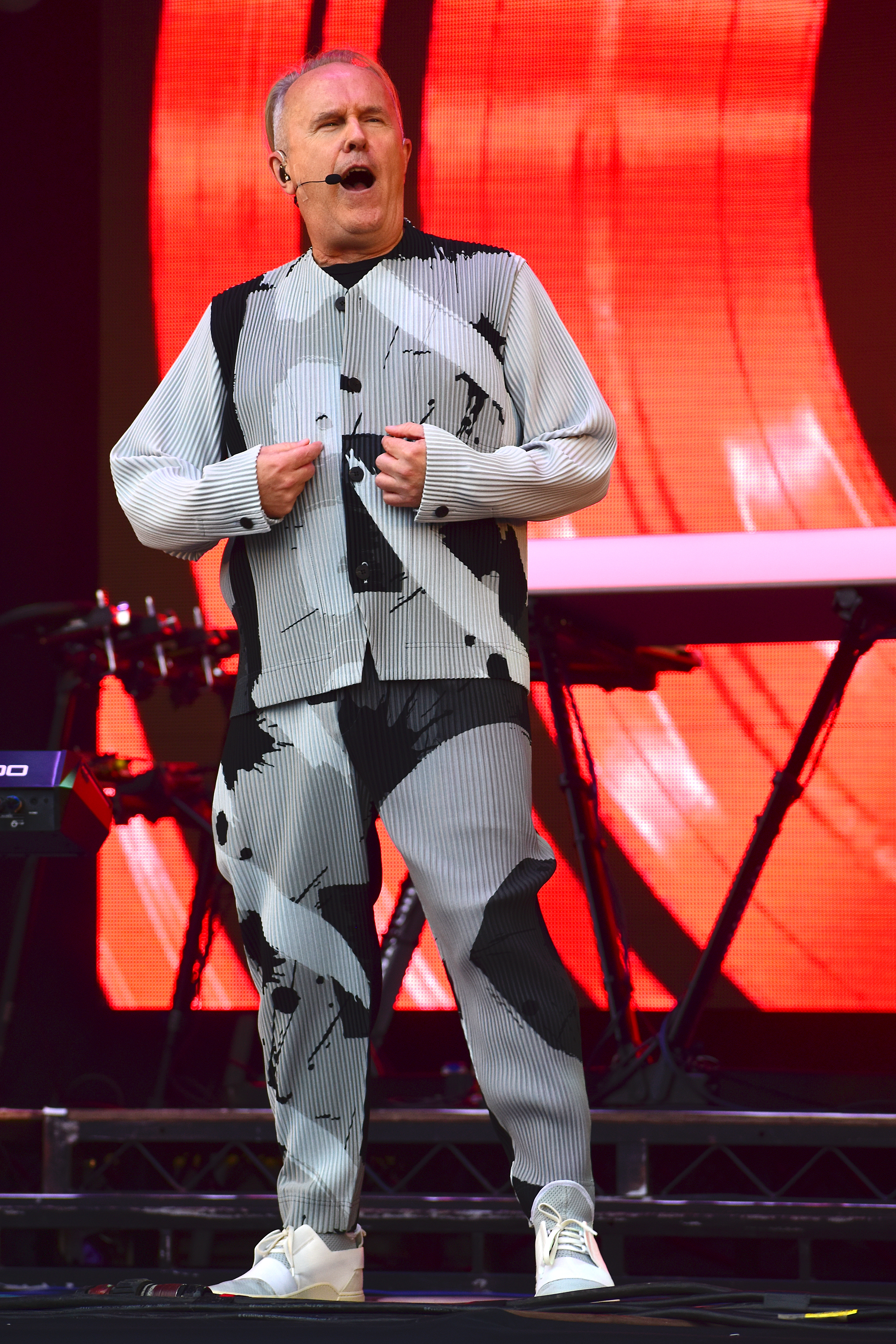
- Jones performing live at Let's Rock Liverpool, 2021

Background information
- Born: John Howard Jones; 23 February 1955 (age 71); Hythe, Hampshire, England
- Genres: Synth-pop; new wave
- Occupations: Musician; singer; songwriter
- Instruments: Vocals; keyboards
- Years active: 1982–present
- Labels: WEA; Elektra; East West; D-tox; Pony Canyon Inc.; Ark 21; Koch
- Formerly of: Red Beat
- Website: www.howardjones.com

John Howard Jones (born 23 February 1955) is a British musician. He had ten top-40 hit singles on the UK singles chart from 1983 to 1986, six of which reached the top 10, including "Like to Get to Know You Well", "What Is Love?", "New Song", and "Things Can Only Get Better". His debut studio album Human's Lib (1984) reached number one on the UK Albums Chart. Around the world, Jones had 15 top-40 hit singles from 1983 to 1992. The 1986 single "No One Is to Blame" reached No. 4 on the US charts. Four others placed in the US top 20.

Jones is associated with the 1980s Second British Invasion of the US. He has been described by the AllMusic editor Stephen Thomas Erlewine as "one of the defining figures of mid-'80s synth-pop", and he performed at Live Aid at Wembley Stadium in 1985. He has sold over eight million albums.

== Early life ==
John Howard Jones was born on 23 February 1955 in Hythe, Hampshire, to Welsh parents and spent his early years in Rhiwbina, Cardiff, South Wales, where he attended Heol Llanishen Fach primary school and then Whitchurch Grammar School. Jones is the eldest of four boys. His brothers, Roy, Martin, and Paul, are all musicians in their own right. Jones began taking piano lessons at age seven. He later attended the Royal Grammar School in High Wycombe, Buckinghamshire.

The family moved to Canada twice, the first time when Jones was nine, settling in Nepean, Ontario, a suburb of Ottawa. There, he joined his first band, widely misidentified as Warrior – a progressive and classic rock band that Jones founded in 1971 and played with until 1972, this after having returned permanently to England.

Jones attended the Royal Northern College of Music in Manchester in the mid-1970s while playing in various bands. He left the college after two-and-a-half years of a three-year course because he did not want to be a classical pianist. He met Buddhist practitioner Bill Bryant, who wrote lyrics for some of Jones's songs and was a major influence in this period. The Jones brothers (minus Howard) had a band called Red Beat in the late 1970s.

== Career ==
=== 1980s ===
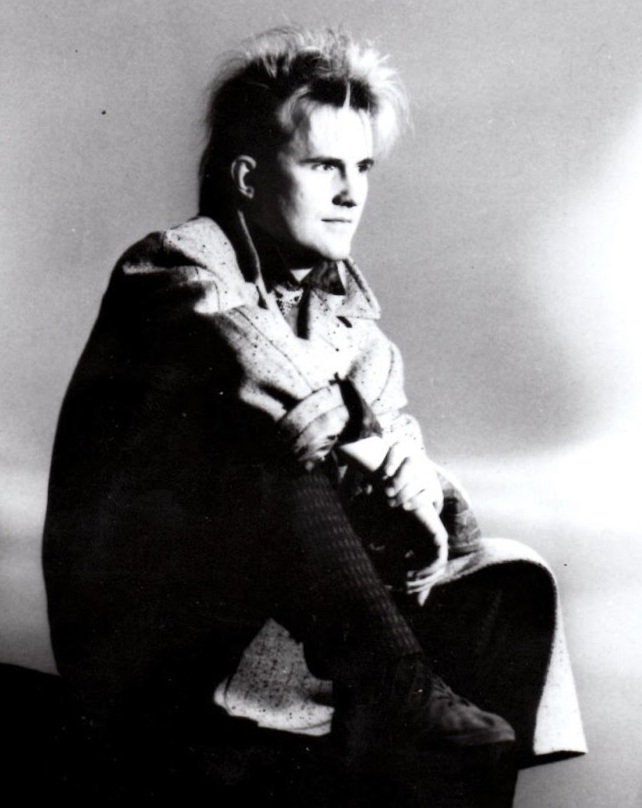
Jones in 1985

Jones appeared as a solo artist in local venues in High Wycombe before inviting mime artist Jed Hoile to perform improvised choreography as Jones played behind him. In 1983, he hired the Marquee Club in London and invited record labels to come and see him perform. After a BBC Radio 1 session, Jones obtained opening act slots with China Crisis and Orchestral Manoeuvres in the Dark (OMD) before signing a recording contract with Warner Music Group, then called WEA, in mid-1983. He has cited influences such as OMD (whose song "Enola Gay" was covered by Jones in early live sets), Keith Emerson and Stevie Wonder.

Jones' first single, "New Song", was released in September 1983. It reached the top 30 in the US and the top 5 in the UK. He made his debut performance on BBC Television's Top of the Pops (TOTP) on 22 September 1983. He had four more hit songs over the next twelve months and a UK number one album, Human's Lib (1984), which eventually went double platinum. Bill Bryant was credited with jointly writing the lyrics for six songs on the album. "New Song", "What Is Love?", and "Pearl in the Shell" all did well during 1983 and 1984. Human's Lib was certified gold and platinum in several countries. Jones developed a loyal teen following. His parents ran his fan club.

In the summer of 1984, Jones released "Like to Get to Know You Well", which he said was 'dedicated to the original spirit of the Olympic Games.' Although it was not an official Olympic anthem for the Games in Los Angeles that summer, it was a worldwide hit. It reached No. 4 on the UK singles chart. The sleeve featured the song title in ten different languages while Jones sang the title line in French and German on the extended 12″ version. The song also appeared in the American teen black comedy film Better Off Dead (1985) and the action-adventure game Grand Theft Auto: Vice City Stories (2006).

In February 1985, Jones appeared with Stevie Wonder, Herbie Hancock and Thomas Dolby at the 27th Grammy Awards ceremony; the group performed a medley of material from all four artists.

Jones' second LP, The 12″ Album was a remix album. It contained six songs, all but one of which had been previously released, but which appeared in elongated formats, including the multilingual version of "Like to Get to Know You Well". The album was certified gold in the UK.

In 1985, Jones released his second studio album, Dream into Action, which included backing vocals by the trio Afrodiziak. Afrodiziak included Caron Wheeler and Claudia Fontaine. His brother Martin played bass guitar. He had to have an extra string added to his instrument to play some of the bass lines, which had originally been scored for keyboard. One of the album's tracks, "No One Is to Blame", was later re-recorded, featuring Genesis's Phil Collins as drummer, record producer, and performing backing vocals. (This second version appears on Jones's US EP Action Replay, and also as a bonus track on the CD version of the following studio album One to One). Dream into Action was Jones's most successful album and popular worldwide; it reached number two in the UK and number 10 in the US, and remained on the US chart for almost a year. The singles "Life in One Day", "Things Can Only Get Better", and "Look Mama" appeared on this album. In July 1985, Jones performed at Wembley Stadium as part of the Live Aid concert, singing his 1984 hit "Hide and Seek" and playing piano. He also embarked on a world tour.

The extended play (EP) Action Replay was released in 1986. It included the re-recorded version of "No One Is to Blame". The song was Jones's biggest US hit, reaching number 4 on the chart. By this time, his fortunes were changing in his native UK, and "No One Is to Blame" peaked at number 16. His next single, "All I Want", peaked at number 35, and would be his last UK top 40 hit. Jones released his third studio album, One to One, in October 1986, which peaked at number 10 in the UK and would be his last UK hit album, despite achieving gold sales status. In the US, Jones continued to fill large arenas, and the single "You Know I Love You... Don't You?" reached the top twenty on the Billboard Hot 100 singles chart in 1986.

In June 1988, Jones performed at Amnesty International's Festival of Youth at the Milton Keynes Bowl. Jones's subsequent studio album, Cross That Line (1989), performed poorly in the UK, but the 1989 singles "Everlasting Love" (his second US Adult Contemporary number 1 hit after "No One Is to Blame") and "The Prisoner" charted in the US. Jones continued to play large venues in the US during the late 1980s, and the Cross That Line Tour played major outdoor venues in the US in 1989.

=== 1990s ===
Jones co-wrote the dance music hits "Heaven Give Me Words" and "Your Wildlife" with the members of Propaganda. The tracks appeared on their second studio album 1234 (1990); "Heaven Give Me Words" reached number 36 on the UK singles chart and number 22 on the US Adult Contemporary chart and "Your Wildlife" reached number 22 on the US Dance Music/Club Play Singles chart.

Jones contributed to the One World One Voice album as part of the One World collaborative, which peaked at number 27 on the UK Albums Chart in 1990.

In 1991, Jones' version of Umberto Tozzi's "Other People Are Us" featured on a compilation album for the Sanremo Music Festival 1991 that hit number 15 on the Italian album charts.

Jones' fifth studio album In the Running (1992) failed to chart in the UK until a remastered version hit the top 100 sales chart in 2021, but the single "Lift Me Up" (1992) charted in the US top 40 and the UK Network Chart top 40 in 1992.

With his 10-year tenure on the Warner Music label at an end, a greatest-hits compilation album The Best of Howard Jones was released in 1993. The album peaked at number 36 in the UK, and by 2005 (12 years after its release) it was certified silver by the BPI for over 60,000 copies sold in the UK.

After Jones' contract with WMG expired, he concentrated on production, songwriting, and running a restaurant. He started his own record label, Dtox, releasing a number of albums through the label, such as Working in the Backroom, produced in his own recording studio ('The Shed' in Maidenhead, Berkshire). The album, which sold over 20,000 copies in the first year of release, was made available only at concerts and through his official website.

Jones toured the US and Europe over the next couple of years. Live Acoustic America came out in 1996 and People in 1998.

=== 2000s ===
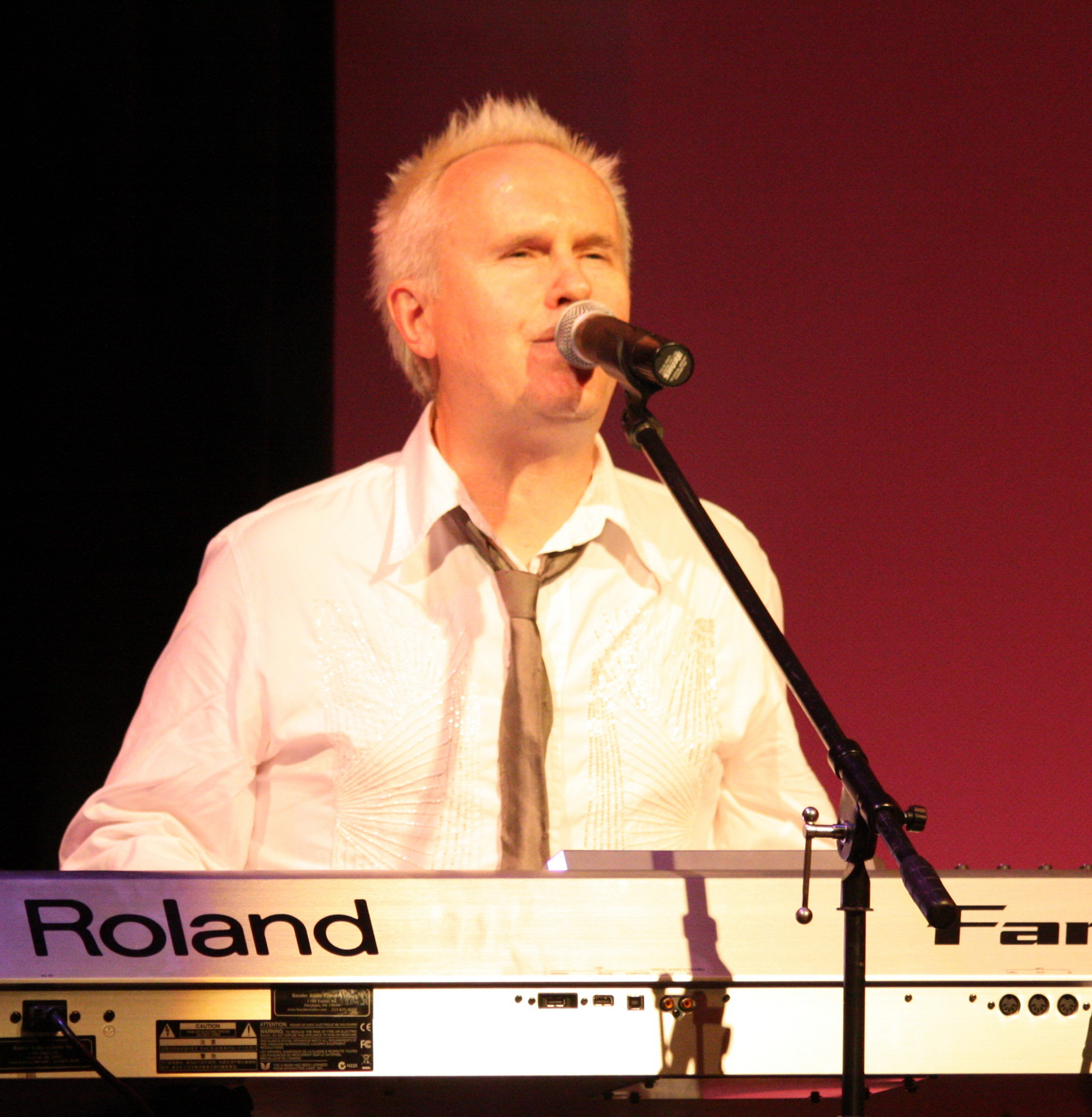
Jones performing at the Sellersville Theater in Sellersville, Pennsylvania, 2008

In 2001, Jones played keyboards on the Ringo Starr & His All-Starr Band tour.

On 20 September 2003, Jones played a 20th anniversary concert at the Shepherd's Bush Empire, West London, commemorating the release of his first single. He was joined by Ultravox's Midge Ure and Nena, as well as his mime artist, Jed Hoile. A recording of this concert was later released on DVD. Jones continued to tour and write new music, collaborating with Robbie Bronnimann to co-write and co-produce music for Sugababes, and Jones' own studio album Revolution of the Heart (2005). He toured playing gigs in the United States, Italy, Germany and Sweden and played a number of times at the Edinburgh Festival in 2006. The same year Jones provided a vocal for the song "Into the Dark" by Ferry Corsten for the latter's studio album, L.E.F. Jones was also featured on Katrina Carlson's cover version of "No One Is to Blame", which entered the US Hot Adult Contemporary Tracks chart in 2007.

In October 2006, Jones released "Building Our Own Future" as a podsafe track, as one of several established artists looking to use podcasts as a new means of promoting their music and tours. The song debuted at number 1 on the PMC Top10 on 29 October 2006 and spent four weeks at the top of the chart. Jones' track "Revolution of the Heart" spent five weeks at number 1 on the PMC Top10 during 2007 and finished the year as the number 2 song in their annual countdown.

Jones embarked on an acoustic tour of Australia in 2007, beginning in Brisbane and concluding on 5 April in Perth. The Revolution Remixed & Surrounded album was followed in November by Live in Birkenhead. Jones performed another acoustic set, with other 1980s acts at the Retrofest, on 1 September 2007 at Culzean Castle in Ayrshire, Scotland.

Jones is a member of Sōka Gakkai International, and is musical director of one of its choirs, the Glorious Life Chorus. The chorus performs some of his songs in its repertoire, including "Building Our Own Future" and "Respected". He returned to Australia again in 2009, this time accompanied by vocalist Laura Clapp and music technologist Robbie Bronnimann. On 26 February 2009, Jones was at the UK premiere of Roland's new V-Piano in Bristol, and performed "Hide and Seek". He continues to tour, and played the 'Big Hair Affair 2009' on 1 August 2009 at the Ryedale Arena, Pickering, North Yorkshire.

Ordinary Heroes was released in November 2009, and he toured London, Cardiff and Manchester with a string section and the Morriston Orpheus Choir (in St David's Hall in Cardiff). During an interview with the Stuck in the '80s podcast after the album's release, Jones said "Soon You'll Go" was inspired by his daughter's upcoming departure to university, but that the song has come to take on broader meaning about cherishing the time he has with people.

Jones is a member of the board of directors for the Featured Artists' Coalition, which was founded in 2009.

=== 2010s ===
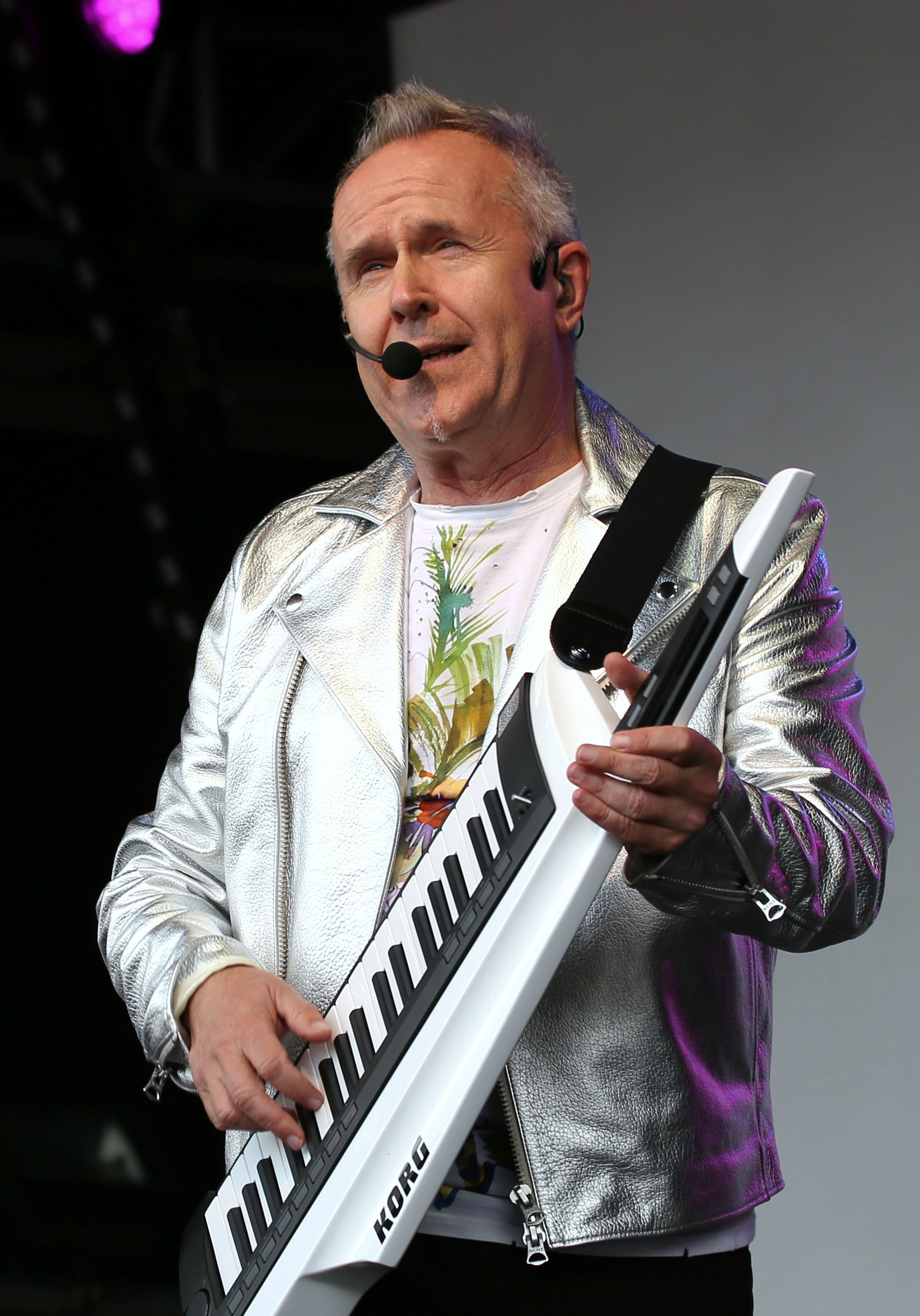
Jones performing at The Kings Arms in All Cannings, Wiltshire, 2015

On 29 November 2011, a UK tour was announced. Human's Lib and Dream into Action were performed in April 2012 across eight venues. A weekly radio series coincided with tour called Electronic 80s with Howard Jones on Absolute Radio.

In 2012, he appeared on "The Song That Changed My Life" on BYUtv, the cable station for Brigham Young University (BYU).

In 2015, the release of Engage was made on Jones' own D-tox Records.

In 2016, he went out on tour supporting Barenaked Ladies as an opening act for their Last Summer on Earth US tour, reuniting with OMD.

In 2018, Jones joined fellow musician Steve Hogarth of neo-prog band Marillion by being present at the unveiling of a sculpture in tribute to David Bowie in Aylesbury, Buckinghamshire.

Transform was released on 10 May, 2019. It features three collaborations with American electronic musician BT. It is the second electronic album in a set of four, the first being Engage. In 2022 the third album was released, Dialogue consisting of eight songs.

=== 2020s ===
Piano Composed was released on 23 May, 2025 in two different versions, one on vinyl and one on CD. This is Jones' third piano-based album. He composed and refined ten piano pieces during COVID-19 lockdowns (from an original 15-20 pieces), which was released as Piano Composed Ivory on vinyl. Inspired by a session with a Steinway Spirio player piano, he reimagined the tracks using its advanced capabilities (creating complex, unplayable arrangements) which was released as Piano Composed Spirio on CD, showcasing two distinct interpretations of the same compositions.

== In the media ==
Jones has spoken of the media's negative perception of him. In 2006, he said: "My songs are not about drug-taking or debauchery or rock and roll. They're about positive thinking and challenging people's ideas. I wasn't fashionable. I never got good reviews. But I'm proud of the fact that I wasn't liked by the media ... Pop music is so reactionary and bigoted. And I found that what's 'cool' is often very shallow and transient."

== Personal life ==
Jones is married to Jan Smith. They have three children: Osheen, Mica and Jasper. In the late 1980s, Jones began practicing Nichiren Buddhism as a member of the worldwide Buddhist association Soka Gakkai International; he has credited his daily practice of chanting "Nam myoho renge kyo" (I devote myself to the Lotus Sutra) since 1991 as "having a profoundly positive effect on my life."

As of 2006, Jones resided in Creech St Michael, near Taunton, Somerset. Jones was a vegetarian for 42 years and became a vegan in 2019.

== Discography ==
=== Studio albums ===
- Human's Lib (1984)
- Dream into Action (1985)
- One to One (1986)
- Cross That Line (1989)
- In the Running (1992)
- Working in the Backroom (1993)
- Angels & Lovers (1997)
- People (1998)
- Piano Solos (For Friends and Loved Ones) (2003)
- Revolution of the Heart (2005)
- Piano Solos (For Friends and Loved Ones) Vol. 2 (2006)
- Ordinary Heroes (2009)
- Engage (2015)
- Transform (2019)
- Dialogue (2022)
- Piano Composed (2025): Released in two different editions, with different versions of the same tracks:

- Piano Composed Ivory (2025) (Vinyl)
- Piano Composed Spirio (2025) (CD)

- Global Citizen (2027)

=== Extended plays ===
- The 12″ Album (1984)
- Action Replay (1986)

== Bibliography ==
- Howard Jones – Helen FitzGerald (1985); Bobcat Books, London – ISBN 0-7119-0767-6
