= List of Canadian Idol finalists =

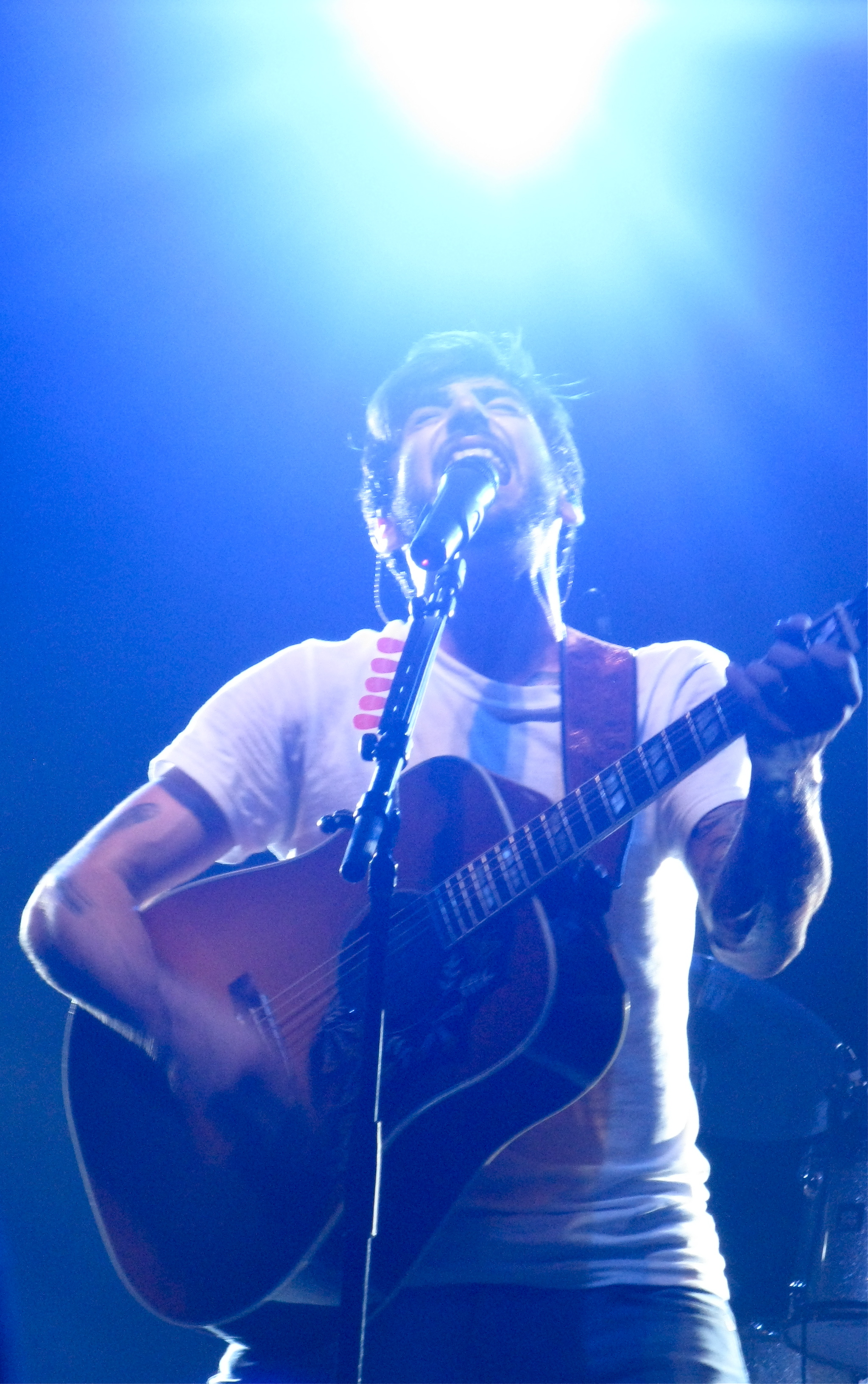
Jacob Hoggard, the lead singer of Hedley, finished third on the second season of Canadian Idol.

Canadian Idol was a Canadian interactive reality game show series. The series premiered their first season in 2003 on CTV and was on air for six seasons. Based on the American version of the show, American Idol, it is part of the Idol series. Canadian Idol was the most-watched Canadian English-language television series of 2008. The show began with a tour across Canada, in which singers audition in front of four judges: Jake Gold, Sass Jordan, Zack Werner, and Farley Flex. The show was cancelled due to the slowing economy.

The show's age requirements allowed people to enter only if they were between 16 and 28 years of age. During every season, the final round of competition featured ten singers, except for season one when it had eleven finalists. 61 contestants have reached the finals of their respective Canadian Idol season. Out of the contestants listed, 26 of them were under the age of 20, including three winners and four runners-up. Seventeen finalists came from the province of Ontario, while British Columbia and Alberta each had nine. Alberta had the most Canadian Idol winners with three—Kalan Porter, Melissa O'Neil, and Theo Tams; Newfoundland and Labrador had the most runners-up with two—Rex Goudie and Craig Sharpe. Prince Edward Island was the only province to never have had a finalist. There has never been a Canadian Idol finalist from a Canadian territory. Toronto, Ontario was the hometown for the most Canadian Idol finalists with five, followed by Abbotsford, British Columbia with four. Rob James, Dwight d'Eon, and Drew Wright were 28 at the time their season's final round began, making them the oldest finalists to have performed; Emily Vinette, Daryl Brunt, Craig Sharpe, and Martha Joy were 16 at the time their season's final round began, making them the youngest finalists to have been in the finals.

== Contestants ==
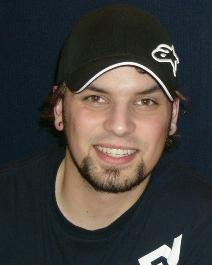
Rex Goudie finished as the runner-up on the third season of Canadian Idol.

Jaydee Bixby finished as the runner-up on the fifth season of Canadian Idol.

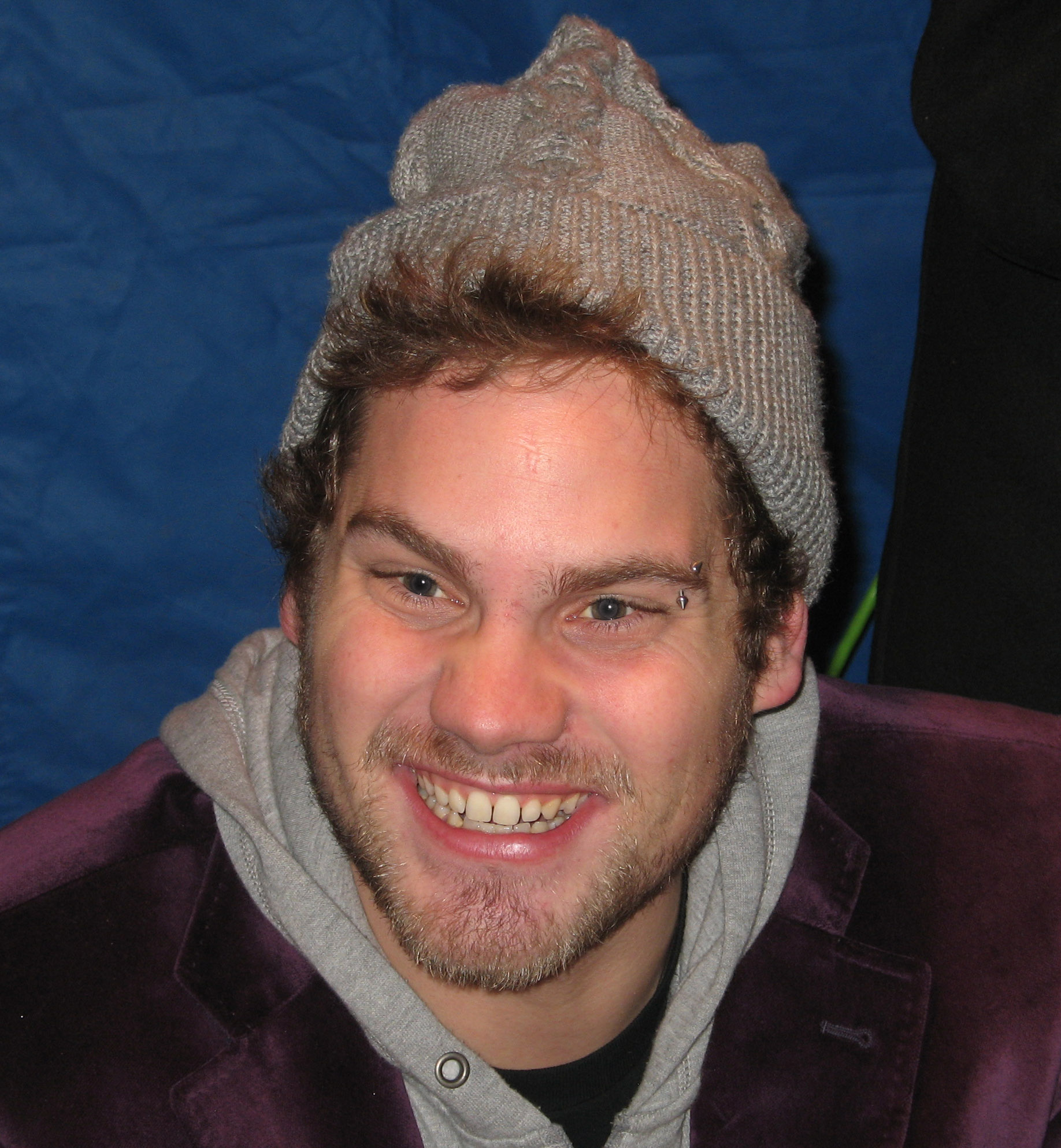
Theo Tams won the most recent sixth season of Canadian idol.

Name	Age^{[a]}	Hometown	Season	Finished	Reference
Richie Wilcox	23	Halifax, Nova Scotia	1	11th	
Candida Clauseri	20	Toronto, Ontario	1	10th	
Karen-Lee Batten	23	Abbotsford, British Columbia	1	9th	
Mikey Bustos	22	Toronto, Ontario	1	8th	
Tyler Hamilton	26	Edmonton, Alberta	1	7th	
Toya Lesmond	22	Ajax, Ontario	1	6th	
Jenny Gear	21	Carbonear, Newfoundland and Labrador	1	5th	
Audrey De Montigny	17	Sainte-Julienne, Quebec	1	4th	
Billy Klippert	24	Calgary, Alberta	1	3rd	
Gary Beals	20	Dartmouth, Nova Scotia	1	Runner-up	
Ryan Malcolm	24	Kingston, Ontario	1	Winner	
Brandy Callahan	24	Halifax, Nova Scotia	2	10th	
Manoah Hartmann	25	Regina, Saskatchewan	2	9th	
Joshua Seller	23	Brigden, Ontario	2	8th	
Kaleb Simmonds	21	Dartmouth, Nova Scotia	2	7th	
Elena Juatco	19	Vancouver, British Columbia	2	6th	
Shane Wiebe	21	Abbotsford, British Columbia	2	5th	
Jason Greeley	27	Upper Island Cove, Newfoundland and Labrador	2	4th	
Jacob Hoggard	20	Abbotsford, British Columbia	2	3rd	
Theresa Sokyrka	23	Saskatoon, Saskatchewan	2	Runner-up	
Kalan Porter	18	Medicine Hat, Alberta	2	Winner	
Emily Vinette	16	Ottawa, Ontario	3	10th	
Ashley Leitao	17	Burnaby, British Columbia	3	9th	
Amber Fleury	26	Calgary, Alberta	3	8th	
Daryl Brunt	16	Sudbury, Ontario	3	7th	
Josh Palmer	22	Saskatoon, Saskatchewan	3	6th	
Casey LeBlanc	17	Nackawic-Millville, New Brunswick	3	5th	
Suzi Rawn	23	Kamloops, British Columbia	3	4th	
Aaron Walpole	26	St. Thomas, Ontario	3	3rd	
Rex Goudie	19	Burlington, Newfoundland and Labrador	3	Runner-up	
Melissa O'Neil	17	Calgary, Alberta	3	Winner	
Kati Durst	26	Goderich, Ontario	4	10th	
Sarah Loverock	25	Gibsons, British Columbia	4	9th	
Brandon Jones	17	Quispamsis, New Brunswick	4	8th	
Rob James	28	Winnipeg, Manitoba	4	7th	
Ashley Coulter	23	Emeryville, Ontario	4	6th	
Steffi DiDomenicantonio	17	Orléans, Ontario	4	5th	
Chad Doucette	18	Chezzetcook, Nova Scotia	4	4th	
Tyler Lewis	20	Rockglen, Saskatchewan	4	3rd	
Craig Sharpe	16	Upper Island Cove, Newfoundland and Labrador	4	Runner-up	
Eva Avila	19	Gatineau, Quebec	4	Winner	
Mila Miller	18	Woodbridge, Ontario	5	10th	
Khalila Glanville	24	Dorval, Quebec	5	9th	
Martha Joy	16	Toronto, Ontario	5	8th	
Greg Neufeld	23	Abbotsford, British Columbia	5	7th	
Tara Oram	23	Hare Bay, Newfoundland and Labrador	5	6th	
Matt Rapley	18	Regina, Saskatchewan	5	5th	
Dwight d'Eon	28	West Pubnico, Nova Scotia	5	4th	
Carly Rae Jepsen	22	Mission, British Columbia	5	3rd	
Jaydee Bixby	17	Drumheller, Alberta	5	Runner-up	
Brian Melo	25	Hamilton, Ontario	5	Winner	
Adam Castelli	26	Hamilton, Ontario	6	10th	
Katherine St-Laurent	17	Otterburn Park, Quebec	6	9th	
Sebastian Pigott	25	Toronto, Ontario	6	8th	
Mark Day	20	Portugal Cove, Newfoundland and Labrador	6	7th	
Amberly Thiessen	19	Seven Persons, Alberta	6	6th	
Mookie Morris	18	Toronto, Ontario	6	5th	
Earl Stevenson	23	Lloydminster, Alberta	6	4th	
Drew Wright	28	Collingwood, Ontario	6	3rd	
Mitch MacDonald	22	Port Hood, Nova Scotia	6	Runner-up	
Theo Tams	22	Lethbridge, Alberta	6	Winner	

== See also ==
- Music of Canada

== Notes ==
- ^{a} Contestant's age at the time the season's final round began.
