= Canadian Idol season 1 =

Canadian Idol
- Season 1
- Hosted by: Ben Mulroney
- Judges: Farley Flex; Jake Gold; Sass Jordan; Zack Werner
- Winner: Ryan Malcolm
- Runner-up: Gary Beals

Release
- Original network: CTV
- Original release: June 9 – September 16, 2003

Season chronology
- Next → Season 2

The first season of Canadian Idol debuted on June 9, 2003. Ryan Malcolm of Kingston, Ontario was the eventual winner. On July 15, 2003, CTV and INSINC announced that broadband video of the program would be available over the Internet.

== Auditions ==
Auditions were held in Toronto, Montreal, Vancouver, Ottawa, Calgary, Winnipeg, Halifax, and St. John's in the spring.

== Finals ==
=== Finalists ===
Finalist	Age *	From	Status
Richie Wilcox	23	Halifax	Eliminated 1st in Week 1
Candida Clauseri	20	Toronto	Eliminated 2nd in Week 1
Karen Lee Batten	23	Abbotsford	Eliminated 3rd in Week 1
Mikey Bustos	22	Toronto	Eliminated 4th in Week 2
Tyler Hamilton	26	Edmonton	Eliminated 5th in Week 2
Toya Alexis	22	Ajax	Eliminated 6th in Week 3
Jenny Gear	21	Carbonear	Eliminated 7th in Week 4
Audrey de Montigny	17	Sainte-Julienne	Eliminated 8th in Week 5
Billy Klippert	24	Calgary	Eliminated 9th in Week 6
Gary Beals	20	Dartmouth	Runner-up
Ryan Malcolm	24	Kingston	Winner

* as of the start of the season

=== Live show details ===
==== Heat 1 (7 July 2003) ====
Order	Artist	Song (original artists)	Result
1	Quisha Wint	"Signed, Sealed, Delivered I'm Yours" (Stevie Wonder)	Eliminated
2	Danny Balkwill	"All in Love is Fair" (Stevie Wonder)	Eliminated
3	Kelly-Ann Evans	"Georgia On My Mind" (Ray Charles)	Eliminated
4	Miranda Walsh	"Turn Your Lights Down Low" (Lauryn Hill)	Eliminated
5	Billy Klippert	"Superstar" (The Carpenters)	Advanced
6	Jessica David	"Love Will Lead You Back" (Taylor Dayne)	Eliminated
7	Mikey Bustos	"Sometimes When We Touch" (Dan Hill)	Advanced
8	Tara Martel	"Neither One of Us (Wants to Be the First to Say Goodbye)" (Gladys Knight & the Pips)	Eliminated
9	Andrew Leader	"Lately" (Stevie Wonder)	Eliminated
10	Candida Clauseri	"I Will Always Love You" (Whitney Houston)	Advanced

Notes

- Candida Clauseri, Mikey Bustos and Billy Klippert advanced to the top 11 of the competition. The other 7 contestants were eliminated.
- Andrew Leader returned for a second chance at the top 11 in the Wildcard Round.

==== Heat 2 (14 July 2003) ====
Order	Artist	Song (original artists)	Result
1	Phil de Torres	"My Cherie Amour" (Stevie Wonder)	Eliminated
2	Faith McMillan	"There You'll Be" (Faith Hill)	Eliminated
3	Jermain Maxwell	"Always and Forever" (Heatwave)	Eliminated
4	Joni Rodney	"You've Changed" (Billie Holiday)	Eliminated
5	Marc Devigne	"Don't Let the Sun Go Down on Me" (Elton John)	Eliminated
6	Nicole Sinclair	"Because You Loved Me" (Celine Dion)	Eliminated
7	Richie Wilcox	"Your Smiling Face" (James Taylor)	Advanced
8	Jenny Gear	"Tower of Song" (Leonard Cohen)	Advanced
9	Tyler Hamilton	"Don't Let the Sun Go Down on Me" (Elton John)	Advanced
10	Bebe Booth	"(Sittin' On) The Dock of the Bay" (Otis Redding)	Eliminated

Notes

- Tyler Hamilton, Jenny Gear and Richie Wilcox advanced to the top 11 of the competition. The other 7 contestants were eliminated.
- Marc Devigne returned for a second chance at the top 11 in the Wildcard Round.

==== Heat 3 (21 July 2003) ====
Order	Artist	Song (original artists)	Result
1	Tyler Done	"Three Times a Lady" (Commodores)	Eliminated
2	Yvette Miller	"The Prayer" (Celine Dion & Andrea Bocelli)	Eliminated
3	Sherry St. Germain	"Chain of Fools" (Aretha Franklin)	Eliminated
4	Justin Ament	"Amazed" (Lonestar)	Eliminated
5	Toya Alexis	"I Believe in You and Me" (Whitney Houston)	Eliminated
6	Audrey de Montigny	"Reflection" (Christina Aguilera)	Advanced
7	Gary Beals	"At This Moment" (Billy Vera)	Advanced
8	Sharon Van den Enden	"Get Here" (Oleta Adams)	Eliminated
9	Ryan Malcolm	"One" (U2)	Eliminated
10	Karen Lee Batten	"Come Away with Me" (Norah Jones)	Advanced

Notes

- Audrey de Montigny, Gary Beals and Karen Lee Batten advanced to the top 11 of the competition. The other 7 contestants were eliminated.
- Tyler Done, Toya Alexis, Sharon van den Enden and Ryan Malcolm returned for a second chance at the top 11 in the Wildcard Round.

==== Wildcard round (28 July 2003) ====
Order	Artist	Song (original artists)	Result
1	Toya Alexis	"Try It On My Own" (Whitney Houston)	Advanced
2	Ryan Malcolm	"Just the Way You Are" (Billy Joel)	Advanced
3	Tyler Done	"Isn't She Lovely" (Stevie Wonder)	Eliminated
4	Kevin Murdock	"Can You Feel the Love Tonight" (Elton John)	Eliminated
5	Andrew Leader	"Me and Mrs. Jones" (Billy Paul)	Eliminated
6	Marc Devigne	"Against All Odds (Take a Look at Me Now)" (Phil Collins)	Eliminated
7	Sharon van den Enden	"A Woman's Worth" (Alicia Keys)	Eliminated

Notes

- Toya Alexis and Ryan Malcolm received the most votes, and completed the top 11.

==== Live Show 1 (4 August 2003) ====
Theme: Canadian Hits

Order	Artist	Song (original artists)	Result
1	Billy Klippert	"If You Could Read My Mind" (Gordon Lightfoot)	Safe
2	Toya Alexis	"If You Asked Me To" (Celine Dion)	Bottom four
3	Richie Wilcox	"Bulletproof" (Blue Rodeo)	Eliminated
4	Karen Lee Batten	"Black Velvet" (Alannah Myles)	Eliminated
5	Gary Beals	"Angel" (Sarah McLachlan)	Safe
6	Candida Clauseri	"The Power of Love" (Celine Dion)	Eliminated
7	Ryan Malcolm	"Try" (Blue Rodeo)	Safe
8	Jenny Gear	"Possession" (Sarah McLachlan)	Safe
9	Mikey Bustos	"Straight from the Heart" (Bryan Adams)	Safe
10	Audrey de Montigny	"Angel" (Sarah McLachlan)	Safe
11	Tyler Hamilton	"After the Rain" (Blue Rodeo)	Safe

==== Live Show 2 (11 August 2003) ====
Theme: Motown

Order	Artist	Song (original artists)	Result
1	Mikey Bustos	"I Heard It Through the Grapevine" (Marvin Gaye)	Eliminated
2	Jenny Gear	"Sir Duke" (Stevie Wonder)	Safe
3	Ryan Malcolm	"For Once in My Life" (Stevie Wonder)	Safe
4	Audrey de Montigny	"Mercy Mercy Me" (Marvin Gaye)	Safe
5	Tyler Hamilton	"My Girl" (The Temptations)	Eliminated
6	Toya Alexis	"If You Really Love Me" (Stevie Wonder)	Safe
7	Billy Klippert	"I Just Called to Say I Love You" (Stevie Wonder)	Bottom three
8	Gary Beals	"Signed, Sealed, Delivered I'm Yours" (Stevie Wonder)	Safe

==== Live Show 3 (18 August 2003) ====
Theme: Summertime Hits

Order	Artist	Song (original artists)	Result
1	Jenny Gear	"Summertime" (Abbie Mitchell)	Safe
2	Gary Beals	"Unchained Melody" (The Righteous Brothers)	Bottom three
3	Audrey de Montigny	"Dreamlover" (Mariah Carey)	Bottom two
4	Billy Klippert	"Have You Ever Seen the Rain" (Creedence Clearwater Revival)	Safe
5	Toya Alexis	"You Are the Sunshine of My Life" (Stevie Wonder)	Eliminated
6	Ryan Malcolm	"Drift Away" (Dobie Gray)	Safe

==== Live Show 4 (25 August 2003) ====
Theme: Elton John

Order	Artist	Song	Result
1	Audrey de Montigny	"The One"	Safe
2	Ryan Malcolm	"Believe"	Bottom two
3	Jenny Gear	"Rocket Man"	Eliminated
4	Gary Beals	"Something About the Way You Look Tonight"	Safe
5	Billy Klippert	"Levon"	Safe

==== Live Show 5 (1 September 2003) ====
Theme: Love Songs

Order	Artist	First song (original artists)	Order	Second song	Result
1	Billy Klippert	"Hooked on a Feeling" (B. J. Thomas)	6	"I Don't Want to Miss a Thing" (Aerosmith)	Safe
2	Audrey de Montigny	"Turn Me On" (Norah Jones)	5	"The Greatest Love of All" (Whitney Houston)	Eliminated
3	Gary Beals	"Let's Stay Together" (Al Green)	8	"When a Man Loves a Woman" (Percy Sledge)	Bottom two
4	Ryan Malcolm	"Crazy" (Willie Nelson)	7	"Hooked on a Feeling" (B. J. Thomas)	Safe

==== Live Show 6: Semi-final (8 September 2003) ====
Theme: Judge's/Competitor's Choice

Order	Artist	First song (original artists)	Second song	Result
1	Ryan Malcolm	"He Ain't Heavy, He's My Brother" (The Hollies)	"Movin' Out (Anthony's Song)" (Billy Joel)	Safe
2	Gary Beals	"Wildflower" (Skylark)	"Overjoyed" (Stevie Wonder)	Safe
3	Billy Klippert	"Everytime You Go Away" (Paul Young)	"Plush" (Stone Temple Pilots)	Eliminated

==== Live final (15 September 2003) ====
Order	Artist	First song	Second song	Third song	Result
1	Ryan Malcolm	"Something More"	"Down on the Corner"	"Stand by Me"	Winner
2	Gary Beals	"To Love Somebody"	"Something More"	"A Whole New World"	Runner-up

== Elimination chart ==
Week:		Top 11	Top 8	Top 6	Top 5	Top 4	Top 3	Top 2
Place	Contestant	Result						
1	Ryan Malcolm				Bottom 2			Winner
2	Gary Beals			Bottom 3		Bottom 2		Runner-up
3	Billy Klippert		Bottom 3				Elim	
4	Audrey de Montigny			Bottom 2		Elim		
5	Jenny Gear				Elim			
6	Toya Alexis	Bottom 4		Elim				
7	Mikey Bustos		Elim					
8	Tyler Hamilton		Elim					
9	Karen Lee Batten	Elim						
10	Candida Clauseri	Elim						
11	Richie Wilcox	Elim						

== See also ==
- List of songs performed on Canadian Idol
