= Steffi DiDomenicantonio =

Canadian singer and actress

- Born: Stephanie Marie Toscano DiDomenicantonio; April 28, 1989 (age 37); Longueuil, Quebec, Canada
- Occupations: Actress, singer
- Years active: 2006–present

Stephanie Marie Toscano DiDomenicantonio (born April 28, 1989), also known as Steffi D, is a Canadian singer and actress, who first rose to prominence as a fifth-place finalist on the fourth season of Canadian Idol.

== Early life ==
DiDomenicantonio was born in Longueuil, Quebec, Canada, but grew up in Ottawa, Ontario. She attended École secondaire publique De La Salle, but left to audition for Canadian Idol. Following her elimination, she returned to complete her final year of high school. DiDomenicantonio is a graduate of the George Brown College theatre program.

== Career ==
=== Canadian Idol ===
In early 2006, while in high school, DiDomenicantonio auditioned for the fourth season of Canadian Idol. At her Ottawa audition, she received mixed-results: judges Sass Jordan and Zack Werner voted "no" whereas Jake Gold and Farley Flex voted "yes". During her time on the show, DiDomenicantonio became known for her unorthodox song choices and unique look that included a bow in her hair. As part of the show, she had the opportunity to be mentored by various music icons, such as Martina McBride. McBride, when speaking about DiDomenicantonio, said "She’s got star quality. I see big things for her future. I’m a big fan."

On August 22, 2006, DiDomenicantonio was eliminated in 5th place.

==== Performances and results ====
Week	Theme	Song	Artist	Status
Top 22	Free Choice	"I Only Have Eyes for You"	Ella Fitzgerald	Bottom 4
Top 18	Free Choice	"White Flag"	Dido	Advanced
Top 14	Free Choice	"Kiss Me"	Sixpence None the Richer	Advanced
Top 10	Canadian Songs	"Alone in the Universe"	David Usher	Bottom 3
Top 9	The Rolling Stones	"Miss You"	The Rolling Stones	Bottom 3
Top 8	Songs from the 1980s	"It's My Life"	Talk Talk	Safe
Top 7	Songs of Classic Rock	"Life on Mars?"	David Bowie	Bottom 2
Top 6	Acoustic Music	"Love Fool"	The Cardigans	Bottom 3
Top 5	Country-Rock Hits	"These Boots Are Made for Walkin'"	Nancy Sinatra	Eliminated

=== Television ===
In 2022 DiDomenicantonio, alongside Anand Rajaraman, hosted the annual CAFTCAD (Canadian Alliance for Film and Television Costume Arts and Design) Awards.

=== Theatre ===
Following her run on Canadian Idol, DiDomenicantonio has performed on stage across Canada and the United States. She made her professional stage debut in the first national tour of Spring Awakening, as Ilse.

In 2013, she was nominated for a Dora Award in the Outstanding Musical Theatre Performance by a Female category for her role of Cinderella in Toronto's Young People's Theatre production of Cinderella (a RATical retelling).

Starting in 2018, DiDomenicantonio portrayed the role of Janice Moshers & others in the Canadian production of Come from Away. She remained with the show until performances were suspended because of the COVID-19 pandemic, and returned to the show until it closed permanently in December 2021.

In 2020, amidst the COVID-19 pandemic that forced theatres to close, DiDomenicantonio and stage manager Lisa Humber co-hosted the web series, Check in from Away, for Mirvish Productions.

Didomenicantonio joined the first national tour of Come from Away in 2022, where she reprised her role of Janice and others. She also reprised her role at a special concert staging of the musical in Gander.

In 2023, Didomenicantonio appeared as Regina Kuntz in Rock of Ages, which played at the Elgin Theatre between February 23 and May 20, 2023.

Didomenicantonio will reprise her role of Janice and others in the Canadian revival production of Come from Away. The musical will play at the Babs Asper Theatre in Ottawa between August 14 and September 1, 2024, before transferring to the Royal Alexandra Theatre where it will begin performances on September 22, 2024.

== Credits ==
=== Theatre ===
Year	Production	Role	Theatre	Category	Ref.
2008–2010	Spring Awakening	Ilse	First National Tour		
2012	Next to Normal	Natalie	Royal Manitoba Theatre Centre	Regional: Winnipeg	
2013	Cinderella (a RATical retelling)	Cinderella	Young People's Theatre	Regional: Toronto	
2013	Rooms: A Rock Romance	Monica P. Miller	Winnipeg Studio Theatre	Regional: Winnipeg	
2014	Look, No Hans!	Mitzi	Festival Theatre	Regional / Drayton Entertainment	
2014	The Rocky Horror Show	Janet Weiss	Sudbury Theatre Centre	Regional: Sudbury	
2015	Cabaret	Sally Bowles	Royal Manitoba Theatre Centre	Regional: Winnipeg	
2015	Peter Pan	Wendy	Elgin Theatre	Regional / Ross Petty Productions	
2016	I Love You, You're Perfect, Now Change	Woman 2	Segal Centre for Performing Arts	Regional: Montreal	
2018	Come from Away	Janice Mosher and others	Royal Manitoba Theatre Centre	Pre-Toronto engagement	
2018-2020, 2021	Come from Away	Janice Mosher and others	Royal Alexandra Theatre	Canadian production / Mirvish Productions	
2022	Come from Away	Janice Mosher and others	First National Tour		
2022	Come from Away	Janice Mosher and others	Steele Community Centre	Concert staging: Gander	
2023	Rock of Ages	Regina Kuntz	Elgin Theatre	Regional / More Entertainment Group	
2024	Come from Away	Janice Mosher and others	Babs Asper Theatre	Pre-Toronto engagement: Ottawa	
2024–2025	Come from Away	Janice Mosher and others	Royal Alexandra Theatre	Canadian production / Mirvish Productions	

=== Film ===
Year	Title	Role	Notes
2014	Stage Fright	Bethany	
2018	Loretta's Flowers	Camille	Short Film
2025	This Time	Liza Minnelli, Sally Bowles	

=== Television ===
Year	Show	Role	Notes
2006	Canadian Idol	Herself	5th-place finalist
2008	Moitié Moitié	Audrey	
2012	Lost Girl	Female Student	Episode: "School's Out"
2012	Sunshine Sketches of a Little Town	Lila Drone	TV movie
2012	Charles Goes on a Date	Charlotte	TV mini series
2013	Nikita	Paula	Episode: S4E01 "Wanted"
2014	Saving Hope	Pauline Flemmer	Episode: S3E07 "The Way We Were"
2016	The Rick Mercer Report	Wife	Episode: S13E18
2016	Private Eyes	Karaoke Singer	Episode: S1E07 "Karaoke Confidential"
2017	Fugazi	Cleo	TV movie
2018	Crawford	Shellers	9 episodes
2018	Cutie Pugs	French Theme Song Singer	Episode: S1E01 "The Ball"
2018	Amélie et Compagnie	India	8 episodes
2020	Ollie's Pack	Ashlor (voice)	Animated series, 3 episodes
2020	Learning to Love Again	Eloise	TV movie
2021	Frankie Drake Mysteries	Tara Tweet	Episodes: S4E02 "Prince in Exile", S4E03 "The Girls Can't Help it" & S4E10 "A Family Affair"
2021	Workin' Moms	Carlena Conway	Episode: S5E08 Punch Dad
2021	Love at Sky Gardens	Shauna	TV movie
2021	Mistletoe and Molly	Cameron	TV movie
2021	Christmas in Washington	Vera	TV movie
2022	Take Note	Vivian Stelgan	5 episodes
2022	Transplant	Cora Maxwell	Episode: S2E09 "Between"
2022	Summer Memories	Famous Rich Kid (voice)	2 episodes
2022	Paris Paris	Sandy	3 episodes: S1E07 "De la Terre à la Lune", S2E08 "Mon coeur est à l'ouest", S2E10 "Mon coeur dans ta main"
2022-2023	Murdoch Mysteries	Melody Struthers	2 episodes: S15E20 "Pendrick's Planetary Parlour", S16E14 "Murdoch at the End of the World"
2023	Luckless in Love	Kyra	TV movie
2023	Accused	Nadine	Episode: S1E01 "Scott's Story"
2023	A Bet with the Matchmaker	Nancy	TV movie
2023-2024	Chucky	Samantha	3 episodes in season 3: S3E01 "Murder at 1600", S3E02 "Let the Right One In", S3E07 "There Will Be Blood"
2024	The Umbrella Academy	Bailey Stone	Episode: S4E03 "The Squid and the Girl"
2025	Star Trek: Strange New Worlds	Dr. Gyud	Episode: S3E07 "What Is Starfleet?"

=== Web series ===
Year	Title	Role	Notes
2020 – present	Check in from Away	Herself	co-star, co-writer, co-producer, co-director

=== Discography ===
==== Cast recordings ====
- Canadian Idol: Spotlights – Sony BMG (2006)
