= Canadian Idol season 2 =

Season of television series

Canadian Idol
- Season 2
- Hosted by: Ben Mulroney
- Judges: Farley Flex; Jake Gold; Sass Jordan; Zack Werner
- Winner: Kalan Porter
- Runner-up: Theresa Sokyrka

Release
- Original network: CTV
- Original release: June 1 – September 16, 2004

Season chronology
- ← Previous; Season 1 Next → Season 3

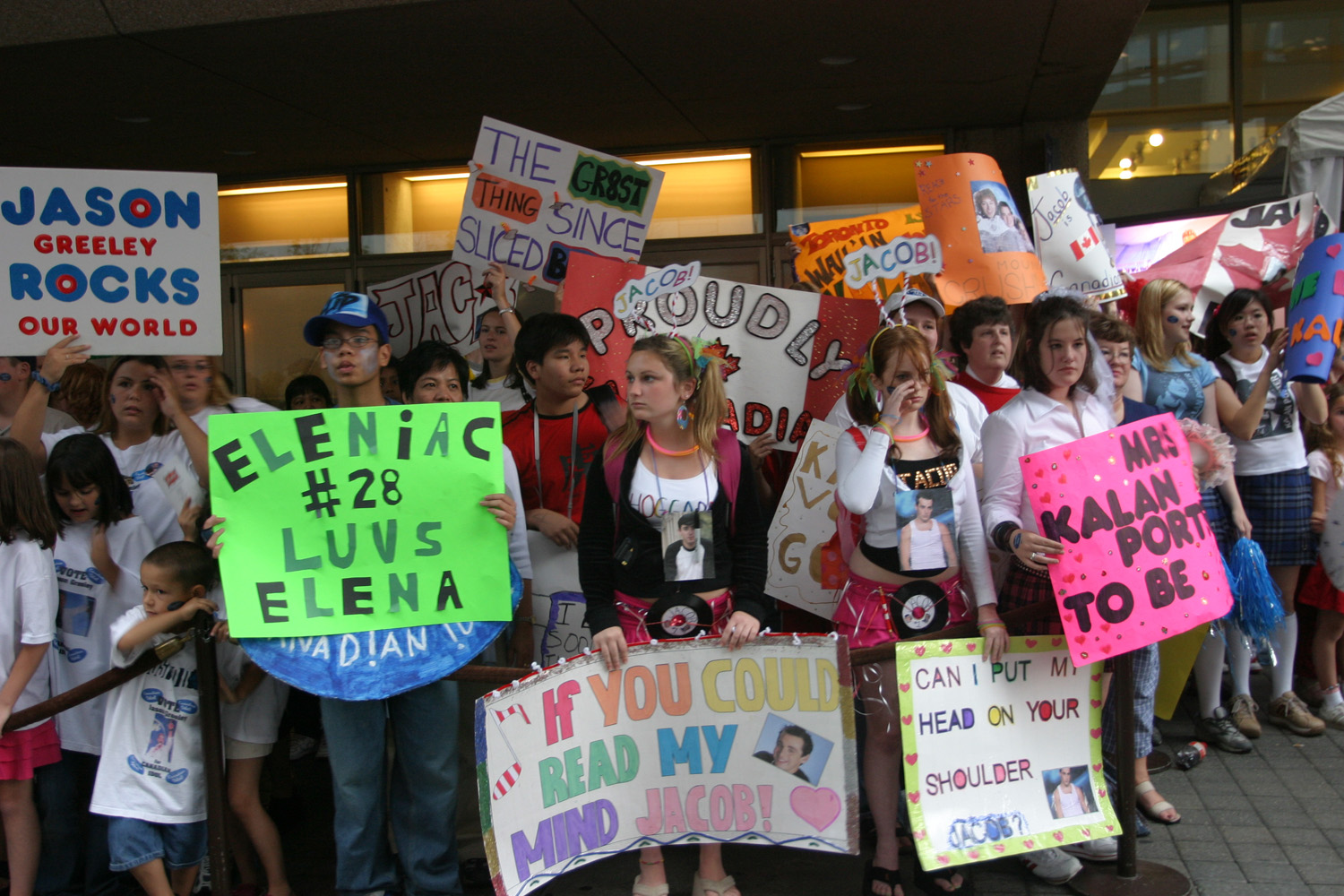
Canadian Idol fans in front of the CTV studio in Toronto in August 2004

The second season of Canadian Idol debuted on June 1, 2004, and became the most watched show in Canada, drawing in over 3 million viewers each week.

Auditions were held in Toronto, Montreal, Vancouver, Ottawa, Edmonton, Winnipeg, Halifax, Regina, and St. John's. The season provided an Idol first when the final six contestants played their own instruments during a group performance of the Gordon Lightfoot classic "Canadian Railroad Trilogy". This was the first time that contestants on any Idol series had performed with instruments;

Kalan Porter of Medicine Hat, Alberta won the series, and Theresa Sokyrka of Saskatoon, Saskatchewan was the runner-up. In November 2004, merely two months after the competition, Porter released his debut album entitled 219 Days – the number days spanning from his first audition to the release of his CD. Other season two finalists who released albums include Sokyrka, Jacob Hoggard (with his band Hedley), Jason Greeley, Shane Wiebe, and Joshua Seller.

== Semifinals ==
=== Semifinal Group 1 (16 June 2004) ===
Order	Artist	Song (original artists)	Result
1	Anabelle Lumayag	"How Am I Supposed to Live Without You" (Laura Branigan)	Eliminated
2	Kyla Sandulak	"God Bless the Child" (Billie Holiday)	Eliminated
3	Joshua Seller	"Somewhere Out There" (James Ingram & Linda Ronstadt)	Advanced
4	Jessica Mitchell	"If I Ain't Got You" (Alicia Keys)	Eliminated
5	Raj Ramawad	"Overjoyed" (Stevie Wonder)	Eliminated
6	Annie Lefebvre	"The Impossible Dream" (Richard Kiley)	Eliminated
7	Andrae Ennis	"Here and Now" (Luther Vandross)	Eliminated
8	Brandy Callahan	"The Greatest Love of All" (George Benson)	Advanced

Notes

- Joshua Seller and Brandy Callahan advanced to the top 10 of the competition. The other 6 contestants were eliminated.
- Kyla Sandulak and Raj Ramawad returned for a second chance at the top 10 in the Wildcard Round.

=== Semifinal Group 2 (23 June 2004) ===
Order	Artist	Song (original artists)	Result
1	Anna Cyzon	"Son of a Preacher Man" (Dusty Springfield)	Eliminated
2	Mohanza Kelly	"A Change Is Gonna Come" (Sam Cooke)	Eliminated
3	Liz Titan	"I Have Nothing" (Whitney Houston)	Eliminated
4	Mark Levesque	"At This Moment" (Billy Vera)	Eliminated
5	Kaleb Simmonds	"Water Runs Dry" (Boyz II Men)	Advanced
6	Filomena Pasqua	"Respect" (Otis Redding)	Eliminated
7	Elena Juatco	"Midnight Train to Georgia" (Gladys Knight & the Pips)	Eliminated
8	Kalan Porter	"Lady" (Kenny Rogers)	Advanced

Notes

- Kalan Porter and Kaleb Simmonds advanced to the top 10 of the competition. The other 6 contestants were eliminated.
- Liz Titan and Elena Juatco returned for a second chance at the top 10 in the Wildcard Round.

=== Semifinal Group 3 (30 June 2004) ===
Order	Artist	Song (original artists)	Result
1	Constant Bernard	"Me and Mrs. Jones" (Billy Paul)	Eliminated
2	Jerrica Santos	"Evergreen" (Barbra Streisand)	Eliminated
3	Andrew Broderick	"Knocks Me Off My Feet" (Stevie Wonder)	Eliminated
4	Valerie Jalbert	"Open Arms" (Journey)	Eliminated
5	Bernard Quilala	"Angel" (Jon Secada)	Eliminated
6	Diane Archer	"Nobody Does It Better" (Carly Simon)	Eliminated
7	Jacob Hoggard	"Only the Good Die Young" (Billy Joel)	Advanced
8	Theresa Sokyrka	"Summertime" (Abbie Mitchell)	Advanced

Notes

- Theresa Sokyrka and Jacob Hoggard advanced to the top 10 of the competition. The other 6 contestants were eliminated.
- Andrew Broderick and Bernard Quilala returned for a second chance at the top 10 in the Wildcard Round.

=== Semifinal Group 4 (7 July 2004) ===
Order	Artist	Song (original artists)	Result
1	Brock Groombridge	"Beauty and the Beast" (Peabo Bryson & Céline Dion)	Eliminated
2	Danielle Falco	"Think Twice" (Celine Dion)	Eliminated
3	Jason Greeley	"Heaven" (Bryan Adams)	Eliminated
4	Manoah Hartmann	"My Immortal" (Evanescence)	Advanced
5	Shane Wiebe	"Forever Young" (Bob Dylan)	Advanced
6	Rebecca Abbott	"Moondance" (Van Morrison)	Eliminated
7	Jermaine Richards	"Endless Love" (Lionel Richie & Diana Ross)	Eliminated
8	Ted Senecal	"Georgia on My Mind" (Hoagy Carmichael)	Eliminated

Notes

- Shane Wiebe and Manoah Hartman advanced to the top 10 of the competition. The other 6 contestants were eliminated.
- Jason Greeley and Ted Senecal returned for a second chance at the top 10 in the Wildcard Round.

=== Wildcard (14 July 2004) ===
Order	Artist	Song (original artists)	Result
1	Bernard Quilala	"I Heard It Through the Grapevine" (Gladys Knight & the Pips)	Eliminated
2	Liz Titan	"Try It on My Own" (Whitney Houston)	Eliminated
3	Raj Ramawad	"Lately" (Stevie Wonder)	Eliminated
4	Kyla Sandulak	"Stand by Me" (Ben E. King)	Eliminated
5	Ted Senecal	"Joy to the World" (Three Dog Night)	Eliminated
6	Elena Juatco	"What I Did for Love" (Priscilla Lopez)	Advanced
7	Jason Greeley	"Sad Songs (Say So Much)" (Elton John)	Advanced
8	Andrew Broderick	"Imagine" (John Lennon)	Eliminated

Notes

- Jason Greeley and Elena Juatco received the most votes, and completed the top 10.

== Finals ==
=== Top 10 (21 July 2004) ===
Theme: Canadian Hits

Order	Artist	Song (original artists)	Result
1	Joshua Seller	"Try" (Blue Rodeo)	Bottom three
2	Brandy Callahan	"Nobody's Supposed to Be Here" (Deborah Cox)	Eliminated
3	Shane Wiebe	"My Song" (Glass Tiger)	Safe
4	Manoah Hartmann	"Hallelujah" (Leonard Cohen)	Bottom two
5	Jason Greeley	"Cuts Like a Knife" (Bryan Adams)	Safe
6	Kalan Porter	"Born to Be Wild" (Steppenwolf)	Safe
7	Theresa Sokyrka	"Good Mother" (Jann Arden)	Safe
8	Kaleb Simmonds	"(Everything I Do) I Do It for You" (Bryan Adams)	Safe
9	Elena Juatco	"Mary Jane" (Alanis Morissette)	Safe
10	Jacob Hoggard	"Put Your Head on My Shoulder" (Paul Anka)	Safe

=== Top 9 (28 July 2004) ===
Theme: British Invasion

Order	Artist	Song (original artists)	Result
1	Jacob Hoggard	"Space Oddity" (David Bowie)	Safe
2	Theresa Sokyrka	"There's a Kind of Hush" (Popularized by Herman's Hermits)	Safe
3	Jason Greeley	"Saturday Night's Alright for Fighting" (Elton John)	Safe
4	Kaleb Simmonds	"Tears in Heaven" (Eric Clapton)	Bottom three
5	Elena Juatco	"The First Cut Is the Deepest" (Popularized by Cat Stevens)	Safe
6	Joshua Seller	"Where the Streets Have No Name" (U2)	Safe
7	Manoah Hartmann	"Sweet Dreams (Are Made of This)" (Eurythmics)	Eliminated
8	Kalan Porter	"The House of the Rising Sun" (The Animals)	Safe
9	Shane Wiebe	"Something About the Way You Look Tonight" (Elton John)	Bottom two

=== Top 8 (4 August 2004) ===
Theme: Rock & Roll

Order	Artist	Song (original artists)	Result
1	Jason Greeley	"Proud Mary" (Creedence Clearwater Revival)	Safe
2	Shane Wiebe	"I Believe in a Thing Called Love" (The Darkness)	Bottom two
3	Joshua Seller	"Iris" (Goo Goo Dolls)	Eliminated
4	Theresa Sokyrka	"Piece of My Heart" (Erma Franklin)	Safe
5	Kalan Porter	"Paint It Black" (The Rolling Stones)	Safe
6	Jacob Hoggard	"Everything" (Lifehouse)	Safe
7	Elena Juatco	"I Just Want to Make Love to You" (Etta James)	Bottom three
8	Kaleb Simmonds	"Hound Dog" (Big Mama Thornton)	Safe

=== Top 7 (11 August 2004) ===
Theme: Lionel Richie

Order	Artist	Song (original artists)	Result
1	Kalan Porter	"Still"	Safe
2	Theresa Sokyrka	"Hello"	Safe
3	Shane Wiebe	"Angel"	Bottom three
4	Kaleb Simmonds	"Truly"	Eliminated
5	Jacob Hoggard	"Brick House"	Safe
6	Elena Juatco	"Fancy Dancer"	Bottom two
7	Jason Greeley	"Easy"	Safe

=== Top 6 (18 August 2004) ===
Theme: Gordon Lightfoot

Order	Artist	Song (original artists)	Result
1	Elena Juatco	"Early Morning Rain"	Eliminated
2	Jason Greeley	"Rainy Day People"	Safe
3	Jacob Hoggard	"Sundown"	Bottom two
4	Shane Wiebe	"The Way I Feel"	Bottom three
5	Theresa Sokyrka	"Song for a Winter's Night"	Safe
6	Kalan Porter	"If You Could Read My Mind"	Safe

=== Top 5 (25 August 2004) ===
Theme: Summertime Hits

Order	Artist	Song (original artists)	Result
1	Shane Wiebe	"Can't Take My Eyes Off You" (Frankie Valli)	Eliminated
2	Kalan Porter	"Long Train Runnin'" (The Doobie Brothers)	Safe
3	Jason Greeley	"Bad Case of Loving You (Doctor, Doctor)" (Robert Palmer)	Bottom two
4	Jacob Hoggard	"I Don't Want to Miss a Thing" (Aerosmith)	Safe
5	Theresa Sokyrka	"Cruisin'" (Smokey Robinson)	Safe

=== Top 4 (1 September 2004) ===
Theme: Standards

Order	Artist	First song (original artists)	Second song	Result
1	Theresa Sokyrka	"It's Only a Paper Moon" (Claire Carleton)	"Dream a Little Dream of Me" (Ernie Birchill)	Bottom two
2	Kalan Porter	"Moon River" (Audrey Hepburn)	"The Way You Look Tonight" (Fred Astaire)	Safe
3	Jason Greeley	"I Won't Dance" (Fred Astaire)	"It Had to Be You" (Popularized by Harry Connick Jr.)	Eliminated
4	Jacob Hoggard	"Straighten Up and Fly Right" (Nat King Cole)	"Unforgettable" (Nat King Cole)	Safe

=== Top 3 (8 September 2004) ===
Theme: Judge's Choice

Order	Artist	First song (original artists)	Second song	Result
1	Jacob Hoggard	"If You Don't Know Me by Now" (Harold Melvin & the Blue Notes)	"I Want You to Want Me" (Cheap Trick)	Eliminated
2	Theresa Sokyrka	"What the World Needs Now Is Love" (Jackie DeShannon)	"Ready for Love" (India Arie)	Safe
3	Kalan Porter	"I Still Haven't Found What I'm Looking For" (U2)	"Nature Boy" (Nat King Cole)	Safe

=== Top 2 (15 September 2004) ===
Order	Artist	First song	Second song	Third song	Result
1	Theresa Sokyrka	"Awake in a Dream"	"Come Away with Me"	"Cruisin'"	Runner-up
2	Kalan Porter	"I Can Only Imagine"	"Born to Be Wild"	"Awake in a Dream"	Winner

Finale result show (September 16, 2004)
Performer	Song	Artist
Top 10	Jailhouse Rock I Only Want to Be with You; Tempted; Under Pressure; Sisters Are Doin' It for Themselves; Johnny B. Goode	Elvis Presley Dusty Springfield; Squeeze; Queen & David Bowie; Eurythmics & Aretha Franklin; Chuck Berry
Ryan Malcolm	Fallin'	Ryan Malcolm
Top 10	You're Still the One Carefree Highway; I'm Like a Bird; Bulletproof; Sundown; The Weight	Shania Twain Gordon Lightfoot; Nelly Furtado; Blue Rodeo; Gordon Lightfoot; The Band
Top 10	Share the Land	The Guess Who
Kalan Porter	Nature Boy	Nat King Cole
Theresa Sokyrka	Good Mother	Jann Arden
Top 2	True Colors	Cyndi Lauper
Kalan Porter	Awake in a Dream	Kalan Porter

=== Elimination Chart ===
Week:		Top 10	Top 9	Top 8	Top 7	Top 6	Top 5	Top 4	Top 3	Top 2
Place	Contestant	Result								
1	Kalan Porter									WINNER
2	Theresa Sokyrka							Bottom 2		RUNNER-UP
3	Jacob Hoggard					Bottom 2			Elim	
4	Jason Greeley						Bottom 2	Elim		
5	Shane Wiebe		Bottom 2	Bottom 2	Bottom 3	Bottom 3	Elim			
6	Elena Juatco			Bottom 3	Bottom 2	Elim				
7	Kaleb Simmonds		Bottom 3		Elim					
8	Joshua Seller	Bottom 3		Elim						
9	Manoah Hartmann	Bottom 2	Elim							
10	Brandy Callahan	Elim								
