= Canadian Idol season 3 =

Canadian Idol
- Season 3
- Hosted by: Ben Mulroney
- Judges: Farley Flex; Jake Gold; Sass Jordan; Zack Werner
- Winner: Melissa O'Neil
- Runner-up: Rex Goudie

Release
- Original network: CTV
- Original release: May 30 – September 14, 2005

Season chronology
- ← Previous; Season 2 Next → Season 4

Melissa O'Neil won the title of the first female Canadian Idol and the youngest Idol in Canada in 2005, beating runner-up Rex Goudie.

== Semi-finals ==
=== Semifinal Group 1 (14 June 2005) ===
Order	Artist	Song (original artists)	Result
1	Matt Humphreys	"Chariot" (Gavin DeGraw)	Eliminated
2	Jenn Beaupré	"Cheek to Cheek" (Frank Sinatra)	Eliminated
3	Melody Bonicel	"All in Love Is Fair" (Stevie Wonder)	Eliminated
4	Daryl Brunt	"When You Believe" (Mariah Carey & Whitney Houston)	Advanced
5	Dianelys Hernandez	"Summertime" (Abbie Mitchell)	Eliminated
6	Stephane Aubin	"Georgia on My Mind" (Ray Charles)	Eliminated
7	Ashley Leitão	"Colors of the Wind" (Vanessa Williams)	Advanced
8	Cher Maendel	"Bohemian Rhapsody" (Queen)	Eliminated

Notes

- Daryl Brunt and Ashley Leitão advanced to the top 10 of the competition. The other 6 contestants were eliminated.
- Dianelys Hernandez and Stephane Aubin returned for a second chance at the top 10 in the Wildcard Round.

=== Semifinal Group 2 (21 June 2005) ===
Order	Artist	Song (original artists)	Result
1	Dave Moffatt	"Overjoyed" (Stevie Wonder)	Eliminated
2	Alinka Chambers	"Black Velvet" (Alannah Myles)	Eliminated
3	David Mongar	"Only the Good Die Young" (Billy Joel)	Eliminated
4	Casey LeBlanc	"Bring It On Home to Me" (Sam Cooke)	Advanced
5	Josh Palmer	"Love Having You Around" (Stevie Wonder)	Eliminated
6	Julie Tellier	"Dirty Man" (Joss Stone)	Eliminated
7	Vince Benenati	"What a Wonderful World" (Louis Armstrong)	Eliminated
8	Emily Vinette	"Don't Cry Out Loud" (Melissa Manchester)	Advanced

Notes

- Casey LeBlanc and Emily Vinette advanced to the top 10 of the competition. The other 6 contestants were eliminated.
- Josh Palmer and Vince Benenati returned for a second chance at the top 10 in the Wildcard Round.

=== Semifinal Group 3 (28 June 2005) ===
Order	Artist	Song (original artists)	Result
1	Barbra Preisman	"I Can't Give You Anything but Love, Baby" (Billie Holiday)	Eliminated
2	Giselle Correia	"Brass in Pocket" (Pretenders)	Eliminated
3	Diego Alvarez	"One More Try" (George Michael)	Eliminated
4	Devika Mathur	"Hero" (Mariah Carey)	Eliminated
5	Rex Goudie	"After the Rain" (Blue Rodeo)	Advanced
6	Michelle Madeira	"One Moment in Time" (Whitney Houston)	Eliminated
7	Barrett Peitsch	"Walking in Memphis" (Marc Cohn)	Eliminated
8	Amber Fleury	"I Can't Make You Love Me" (Bonnie Raitt)	Advanced

Notes

- Amber Fleury and Rex Goudie advanced to the top 10 of the competition. The other 6 contestants were eliminated.
- Devika Mathur and Barrett Peitsch returned for a second chance at the top 10 in the Wildcard Round.

=== Semifinal Group 4 (5 July 2005) ===
Order	Artist	Song (original artists)	Result
1	Genevieve Nadeau	"Some Kind of Wonderful" (Soul Brothers Six)	Eliminated
2	Luke O'Reilly	"Bless the Broken Road" (Rascal Flatts)	Eliminated
3	Keely Hutton	"Don't Cry Out Loud" (Melissa Manchester)	Eliminated
4	Aaron Walpole	"Try" (Blue Rodeo)	Eliminated
5	Danian Vickers	"Get Here" (Oleta Adams)	Eliminated
6	Suzi Rawn	"Fortunate Son" (Creedence Clearwater Revival)	Advanced
7	Matt Kennedy	"I'll Be" (Edwin McCain)	Eliminated
8	Melissa O'Neil	"Concrete Angel" (Martina McBride)	Advanced

Notes

- Melissa O'Neil and Suzi Rawn advanced to the top 10 of the competition. The other 6 contestants were eliminated.
- Luke O'Reilly and Aaron Walpole returned for a second chance at the top 10 in the Wildcard Round.

=== Wildcard (12 July 2005) ===
Order	Artist	Song (original artists)	Result
1	Stephane Aubin	"Ain't No Sunshine" (Bill Withers)	Eliminated
2	Barrett Peitsch	"At This Moment" (Billy Vera)	Eliminated
3	Devika Mathur	"Un-Break My Heart" (Toni Braxton)	Eliminated
4	Vince Benenati	"I Could Not Ask for More" (Edwin McCain)	Eliminated
5	Aaron Walpole	"Drift Away" (Dobie Gray)	Advanced
6	Dianelys Hernandez	"Unchain My Heart" (Joe Cocker)	Eliminated
7	Luke O'Reilly	"Amazed" (Lonestar)	Eliminated
8	Josh Palmer	"Fooled Around and Fell in Love" (Elvin Bishop)	Advanced

Notes

- Aaron Walpole and Josh Palmer received the most votes, and completed the top 10.

== Finals ==
=== Top 10 (19 July 2005) ===
Theme: Canadian Hits

Order	Artist	Song (original artists)	Result
1	Aaron Walpole	"You Ain't Seen Nothing Yet" (Bachman-Turner Overdrive)	Safe
2	Emily Vinette	"Crying" (Roy Orbison)	Eliminated
3	Daryl Brunt	"With These Eyes" (Roch Voisine)	Bottom two
4	Suzi Rawn	"Everytime I See Your Picture" (Luba)	Safe
5	Melissa O'Neil	"Believe in You" (Amanda Marshall)	Bottom three
6	Ashley Leitão	"Let It Rain" (Amanda Marshall)	Safe
7	Rex Goudie	"Born to Be Wild" (Steppenwolf)	Safe
8	Amber Fleury	"Possession" (Sarah McLachlan)	Safe
9	Josh Palmer	"Hallelujah" (Leonard Cohen)	Safe
10	Casey LeBlanc	"From This Moment On" (Shania Twain)	Safe

=== Top 9 (26 July 2005) ===
Theme: Stevie Wonder

Order	Artist	Song	Result
1	Casey LeBlanc	"Heaven Help Us All"	Safe
2	Josh Palmer	"That Girl"	Bottom three
3	Amber Fleury	"Lately"	Safe
4	Daryl Brunt	"Superstition"	Safe
5	Ashley Leitão	"Sir Duke"	Eliminated
6	Rex Goudie	"Pastime Paradise"	Safe
7	Melissa O'Neil	"Living for the City"	Bottom two
8	Aaron Walpole	"You Haven't Done Nothin'"	Safe
9	Suzi Rawn	"Higher Ground"	Safe

=== Top 8 (2 August 2005) ===
Theme: The 80s

Order	Artist	Song (original artists)	Result
1	Amber Fleury	"Just Like Jesse James" (Cher)	Eliminated
2	Rex Goudie	"Every Breath You Take" (The Police)	Safe
3	Casey LeBlanc	"Like a Prayer" (Madonna)	Safe
4	Daryl Brunt	"Tainted Love" (Soft Cell)	Safe
5	Suzi Rawn	"Heartbreaker" (Pat Benatar)	Bottom two
6	Aaron Walpole	"Working for the Weekend" (Loverboy)	Safe
7	Josh Palmer	"In the Air Tonight" (Phil Collins)	Bottom three
8	Melissa O'Neil	"Holding Out for a Hero" (Bonnie Tyler)	Safe

=== Top 7 (9 August 2005) ===
Theme: Standards

Order	Artist	Song (original artists)	Result
1	Suzi Rawn	"Minnie the Moocher" (Cab Calloway)	Safe
2	Aaron Walpole	"I Can't Believe That You're in Love with Me" (Dean Martin)	Bottom two
3	Melissa O'Neil	"It's De-Lovely" (Ella Fitzgerald)	Safe
4	Josh Palmer	"When I Fall in Love" (Nat King Cole)	Safe
5	Rex Goudie	"Feeling Good" (Nina Simone)	Safe
6	Casey LeBlanc	"I Could Write a Book" (Dinah Washington)	Bottom three
7	Daryl Brunt	"What a Wonderful World" (Louis Armstrong)	Eliminated

=== Top 6 (16 August 2005) ===
Theme: Classic Rock

Order	Artist	Song (original artists)	Result
1	Melissa O'Neil	"Alone" (Heart)	Safe
2	Rex Goudie	"Turn the Page" (Bob Seger)	Bottom three
3	Casey LeBlanc	"I'll Stand by You" (The Pretenders)	Safe
4	Aaron Walpole	"Hot Blooded" (Foreigner)	Safe
5	Suzi Rawn	"Piece of My Heart" (Janis Joplin)	Bottom two
6	Josh Palmer	"Layla" (Derek and the Dominos)	Eliminated

=== Top 5 (23 August 2005) ===
Theme: Burton Cummings & The Guess Who

Order	Artist	Song (original artists)	Result
1	Rex Goudie	"No Sugar Tonight" (The Guess Who)	Safe
2	Casey LeBlanc	"Timeless Love" (Burton Cummings)	Eliminated
3	Suzi Rawn	"American Woman" (The Guess Who)	Bottom two
4	Melissa O'Neil	"My Own Way to Rock" (Burton Cummings)	Safe
5	Aaron Walpole	"These Eyes" (The Guess Who)	Safe

=== Top 4 (30 August 2005) ===
Theme: Elvis Presley

Order	Artist	First song	Second song	Result
1	Aaron Walpole	"(Let Me Be Your) Teddy Bear"	"Love Me Tender"	Safe
2	Suzi Rawn	"Heartbreak Hotel"	"Can't Help Falling in Love"	Eliminated
3	Melissa O'Neil	"A Little Less Conversation"	"You'll Never Walk Alone"	Safe
4	Rex Goudie	"Blue Suede Shoes"	"If I Can Dream"	Safe

=== Top 3 (6 September 2005) ===
Theme: Barenaked Ladies

Order	Artist	First song	Second song	Result
1	Rex Goudie	"Brian Wilson"	"Call and Answer"	Safe
2	Aaron Walpole	"Break Your Heart"	"Enid"	Eliminated
3	Melissa O'Neil	"The Old Apartment"	"When I Fall"	Safe

=== Top 2 (13 September 2005) ===
Order	Artist	First song	Second song	Third song	Result
1	Melissa O'Neil	"Angel of the Morning"	"A Broken Wing"	"Alive"	Winner
2	Rex Goudie	"Alive"	"Bulletproof"	"Superman (It's Not Easy)"	Runner-up

== Elimination Chart ==
Week:		Top 10	Top 9	Top 8	Top 7	Top 6	Top 5	Top 4	Top 3	Top 2
Place	Contestant	Result								
1	Melissa O'Neil	Bottom 3	Bottom 2							Won
2	Rex Goudie					Bottom 3				Elim
3	Aaron Walpole				Bottom 2				Elim	
4	Suzi Rawn			Bottom 2		Bottom 2	Bottom 2	Elim		
5	Casey LeBlanc				Bottom 3		Elim			
6	Josh Palmer		Bottom 3	Bottom 3		Elim				
7	Daryl Brunt	Bottom 2			Elim					
8	Amber Fleury			Elim						
9	Ashley Leitao		Elim							
10	Emily Vinette	Elim								

== Reception ==
The season's three-night premiere received 2.3 million, 2.1 million, and 1.8 million viewers, up roughly 25% from season two. The finale drew 2.7 million viewers.
