= Jenny Gear =

Canadian singer (born 1982)

Jenny Gear (born April 23, 1982) is a Canadian singer and former Canadian Idol contestant.

== On Canadian Idol ==
Gear auditioned for Season One of Canadian Idol in St. John's, Newfoundland and Labrador in 2003, bringing the panel of judges (which included Jake Gold, Sass Jordan, Farley Flex and Zach Werner) to tears with her rendition of "God Bless the Child".

She next completed the Toronto rounds and earned herself a spot in the semi-finals. There, she performed "Tower Of Song" by Leonard Cohen and received mixed reviews from the judges. Some of the judges' comments include "In true Newfoundland style I can't help but feel that you are slightly a fish out of water in all of this," from Zach Werner and "When I get a sense you're enjoying yourself, I enjoy myself. And that's all it boils down to," from Farley Flex. The next night, she garnered enough votes to earn herself the fifth seat in the Top 11.

On August 4, the Top 11 performed Canadian hits. Gear excelled with her version of Sarah McLachlan's "Possession", showing off her incredible range and pitch-perfect control, and after all the voting, was safe from elimination. Some of the judges' comments include "You do put the Canadian in Canadian Idol," from Zach Werner and "It never fails to amaze me the amount of control you have when you're singing. This unbelievably emotional stuff," from Sass Jordan.

The next theme, Motown, proved to be a challenge for Gear. She sang "Sir Duke" by Stevie Wonder and although she received mediocre comments from the judges, she was safe and without a trip to the bottom three. Some of the judges' comments include "This girl can really sing," from Zach Werner and "You get up there and you just have this vibe about you, and you be Jenny. You can't judge Jenny Gear. It's just impossible," from Jake Gold.

For the Top 6, Jenny performed an amazing rendition of "Summertime" and remained safe from elimination. Some of the judges' comments include "Jenny, that was a really beautiful interpretation," from Sass Jordan and "Jenny I gotta say, I feel vindicated. You've just shown Canada what we first saw in St. John's. That was riveting," from Farley Flex.

The next theme night was Elton John and Jenny chose to sing "Rocket Man." Her performance earned her a mediocre response from the judges with comments that included "With the song selection and the arrangement and how level your performance was it was sort of like the words you don't want to hear your surgeon say... whoops," from Zach Werner and "I think you took a song that's extremely hard to sing and you did a damn fine job," from Sass Jordan. The next night, she had her first and last trip to the bottom two along with eventual Canadian Idol winner Ryan Malcolm. When the results were announced the crowd was shocked to find Jenny eliminated.

=== Post-Idol ===
After the show, Idol judge Jake Gold signed Gear to his talent agency, but they eventually parted ways due to creative differences.

Jenny Gear's debut album "Jenny Gear and The Whiskey Kittens", which was recorded entirely in her grandmother's kitchen, was actually recorded before she appeared on Idol. The CD was released in late 2004 and has been the top seller on Atlantic Music Online for the last two and a half years.

She has appeared on many TV shows including "Breakfast Television", "MuchMusic's Going Coastal", "Live at 5", and "Out of the Fog"." She also appeared in her own special on CBC in 2004 before the release of her album. Jenny Gear is currently playing clubs around the St. John's area and working on her 2nd CD.

== Jenny Gear and The Whiskey Kittens ==
Jenny Gear and The Whiskey Kittens, the band on Jenny's first CD, are no longer performing together. Most of the members are now pursuing solo careers. Accompanying Jenny at most of her gigs lately is the well known St. John's guitarist Sandy Morris.

=== Singles ===
Year	Single	Chart peaks	Album
Year	Single	CAN	Album
2003	"Tower of Song"	84	Jenny Gear and the Whiskey Kittens
2003	"She's Like the Shallow"	10	Jenny Gear and the Whiskey Kittens
2004	"Murder in the Southlands"	8	Jenny Gear and the Whiskey Kittens
2005	"Brave Percy"	1	Jenny Gear and the Whiskey Kittens
2005	"Win, Win"	22	Jenny Gear and the Whiskey Kittens
2005	"Pale Slice of Moon"	6	Jenny Gear and the Whiskey Kittens
2006	"All You Gotta Do"	17	Jenny Gear and the Whiskey Kittens

== Trivia ==
- Jenny Gear appears in the Great Big Sea video for "Captain Kidd" from The Hard and the Easy album.
