= Canadian Idol season 5 =

Canadian Idol
- Season 5
- Hosted by: Ben Mulroney
- Judges: Sass Jordan; Farley Flex; Zack Werner; Jake Gold
- Winner: Brian Melo
- Runner-up: Jaydee Bixby
- Finals venue: John Bassett Theatre

Release
- Original network: CTV
- Original release: June 5 – September 11, 2007

Season chronology
- ← Previous; Season 4 Next → Season 6

The fifth season of Canadian Idol is the fifth installation of the Idol series in Canada. It was again hosted by Ben Mulroney, with Farley Flex, Jake Gold, Sass Jordan and Zack Werner all returning as judges. The show premiered on June 5, 2007, with a 90-minute episode. Voting began during the fourth week. New events introduced that season included the Help Idols build a house and the Kraft Confidential with David Kerr. The elimination song for this year was Walk on Home by Kalan Porter. The final episode of the season was broadcast on September 11, 2007, when Brian Melo was crowned Canadian Idol.

== Plan ==
On December 19, 2006, CTV announced their plans for the fifth season of Canadian Idol. It started off in Vancouver on February 3, 2007, and went on to 9 more cities across Canada in a 10-week period.

== Auditions ==
This was the first season in which Canadian auditioners could play along with their instrument in their audition, making it the second Idol program to do so, after the 2006 season of Australian Idol. The auditioners were allowed to bring any type of instrument they wish as long as they are able to sing and play at the same time. They must be able to carry their instrument with them throughout the audition process. CTV explained on its website that many competitors have indicated they feel more comfortable in an audition setting by accompanying themselves on an instrument. Competitors were judged on a whole range of factors, including singing ability, style and presence. They state that the "Ability to play an instrument is yet another dimension to each competitor's complete package."

Auditions were held in eleven cities in the winter and early spring of 2007 in the following order:

- February 3 & 4: Vancouver BC Place Stadium
- February 10 & 11: Calgary Pengrowth Saddledome
- February 17 & 18: Saskatoon Credit Union Centre
- February 24 & 25: Winnipeg MTS Centre
- March 3 & 4: London John Labatt Centre
- March 10 & 11: Montreal Pepsi Forum
- March 17 & 18: Ottawa St-Laurent Centre
- March 24 & 25: Halifax Halifax Metro Centre
- April 4: St. John's Mile One Centre
- Starting April 11: Toronto Yonge-Dundas Square (now Sankofa Square)

== Audition process ==
The audition process may vary in different cities. However, the concept is essentially the same.

=== Tier 1 ===
After the competitor receives their number at the registration desk, they are allowed to go to other places until their number is called. After their number is called, they will be asked to wait in the front line for their audition for the first round. Auditioners will be sent in groups of five, taken to the waiting room by an audition crew. The audition crews responsible for the groups will take the competitors to Tier 1, where they will audition to the representative of a producer with their group.

Each auditioner will take turn to sing one song for as long as they want. If the representative is not sure about the competitor's performance, they may ask them to sing another song. After all five auditioners have sung, the representatives may make comments, and announces auditioners that will not go through to the second round. The successful auditioners will be given a Yellow Ticket, and will return to the waiting room to wait for an audition crew to lead them to a separate waiting room where they wait for the second round of audition.

=== Tier 2 ===
After the auditioner's number is called for the second round of audition known as Tier 2, an audition crew will take them along with couple others to the waiting room once more. The competitors will have to wait there until their number is called, and then they will be sent into the audition room. In Tier 2, the competitors will audition to a producer of the show, where they will be asked to sing a minimum of two songs. The successful auditioner will receive a Blue Ticket, and will need to return to the registration desk to register for the Celebrity Judges round.

=== Celebrity judges ===
By assigned order of time on successful auditioner's registration paper, they will be called into the final round of audition where they meet the Canadian Idol Celebrity Judges Farley Flex, Jake Gold, Sass Jordan and Zack Werner. It will be held at a secret location on another day.

In this round, the auditioner will have to prepare one song in the song list that is given when registering for the third round, along with four other songs of their own choice. Successful auditioners will be given a Gold Ticket, where they will have a chance to participate in the Top 200 week in Toronto.

The Gold Ticket receivers are asked to remain absolutely silent, or they may face possible disqualification due to fairness purposes.

== Top 212 ==
The Top 212 auditions were again held in Toronto. The 212 singers from across the country selected stepped in front of the four judges during the Top 200 week. They competed against cuts that included solos, duets and group performances. Eventually, the group as whittled down to just 22 finalists.

== Top 22, The Semi-Finals ==
The Top 22 was announced on June 19. One original member of the Top 22, Ritchea Hodge, dropped out for personal reasons and was replaced by Scarlett Burke.

Those who were eliminated before the finals are listed below.

=== Males Eliminated ===
- Liam Styles Chang, 27, is a singer/songwriter from Victoria, British Columbia. Liam is currently the lead singer of the band Aivia.
- Tyler Mullendore, 19, is a construction worker from Lake Ainslie, Nova Scotia. He is notable for making the judges laugh during his audition, when after being asked if he had ever seen the show, he retorted, "Yeah, I seen 'er, buddy."
- Andrew Austin, 27, is a musician from Sarnia, Ontario.
- Clifton Murray, 18, is a singer and actor from Toronto, Ontario.
- Derek Hoffman, 17, is a student from Aurora, Ontario. Derek is currently the lead singer of the pop/rock band Brighter Brightest.
- Justyn Wesley, 22, is a singer/songwriter and producer from Toronto, Ontario.

=== Females Eliminated ===
- Montana Martin Iles, 16, is a student from Sainte-Julienne, Quebec. Despite performing alone during the group part of Toronto Week, she impressed the judges with her raw style.
- Annika Odegard, 16, is a student and performer from Calgary, Alberta
- Naomi-Joy Blackhall, 25, is an account manager from Halifax, Nova Scotia. She and her fellow Top 22 member Dwight d'Eon have been labelled as the rockers for this season.
- Scarlett Burke, 18, is a performer from Toronto, Ontario who joined the competition after Ritchea Hodge dropped out for personal reasons. Prior to the show, Burke had played Nala in The Lion King at the Princess of Wales Theatre in Toronto.
- Maud Coussa-Jandl, 25, is a Promotions Coordinator from Sherbrooke, Quebec.
- Christine Hanlon, 21, is a singer/songwriter from Toronto, Ontario. She was shown in the fourth episode as continuing in the competition despite a throat infection.

Withdrew

Ritchea Hodge is a 16-year-old High School Student from Brampton, Ontario. Hodge dropped out of the competition for unrevealed, personal reasons prior to June 27.

=== Top 22 ===
==== Men ====
Order	Contestant	Song (original artist)	Result
1	Jaydee Bixby	"Johnny B. Goode" (Chuck Berry)	Safe
2	Clifton Murray	"I'll Be" (Edwin McCain)	Bottom 4
3	Derek Hoffman	"Move Along" (The All-American Rejects)	Eliminated
4	Justyn Wesley	"Some Kind of Wonderful" (Grand Funk Railroad)	Eliminated
5	Dwight d'Eon	"Cry" (Godley & Creme)	Safe
6	Greg Neufeld	"This Love" (Maroon 5)	Safe
7	Tyler Mullendore	"Brown Sugar" (The Rolling Stones)	Safe
8	Andrew Austin	"Freedom! '90" (George Michael)	Bottom 4
9	Matt Rapley	"Isn't She Lovely" (Stevie Wonder)	Safe
10	Brian Melo	"Stereo" (The Watchmen)	Safe
11	Liam Styles Chang	"This Magic Moment" (The Drifters)	Safe

==== Women ====
Order	Contestant	Song (original artist)	Result
1	Tara Oram	"Rose Garden" (Lynn Anderson)	Safe
2	Martha Joy	"I Don't Want to Miss a Thing" (Aerosmith)	Safe
3	Montana Martin Iles	"The Bird and the Worm" (The Used)	Safe
4	Mila Miller	"I'm Going Down" (Rose Royce)	Bottom 4
5	Maud Coussa-Jandl	"Dreams" (The Cranberries)	Eliminated
6	Annika Odegard	"Helplessly, Hopelessly" (Jessica Andrews)	Safe
7	Naomi-Joy Blackhall	"Judgement Day" (Whitesnake)	Bottom 4
8	Christine Hanlon	"Possession" (Sarah McLachlan)	Eliminated
9	Scarlett Burke	"I Learned from the Best" (Whitney Houston)	Safe
10	Khalila Glanville	"Family Portrait" (Pink)	Safe
11	Carly Rae Jepsen	"Put Your Records On" (Corinne Bailey Rae)	Safe

=== Top 18 ===
==== Men ====
Order	Contestant	Song (original artist)	Result
1	Liam Styles Chang	"She's So High" (Tal Bachman)	Safe
2	Andrew Austin	"Sunday Morning" (Maroon 5)	Eliminated
3	Dwight d'Eon	"Used to Be Alright" (I Mother Earth)	Bottom 4
4	Clifton Murray	"You Give Me Something" (James Morrison)	Eliminated
5	Greg Neufeld	"Geek in the Pink" (Jason Mraz)	Safe
6	Brian Melo	"Angels" (Robbie Williams)	Bottom 4
7	Jaydee Bixby	"I Got a Woman" (Ray Charles)	Safe
8	Matt Rapley	"You Raise Me Up" (Secret Garden)	Safe
9	Tyler Mullendore	"Have a Little Faith in Me" (John Hiatt)	Safe

==== Women ====
Order	Contestant	Song (original artist)	Result
1	Martha Joy	"To Where You Are" (Josh Groban)	Safe
2	Tara Oram	"Safe in the Arms of Love" (Michelle Wright)	Safe
3	Naomi-Joy Blackhall	"Here with Me" (Dido)	Eliminated
4	Carly Rae Jepsen	"Sweet Ones" (Sarah Slean)	Safe
5	Scarlett Burke	"Proud Mary" (Tina Turner)	Eliminated
6	Montana Martin Iles	"Thnks fr th Mmrs" (Fall Out Boy)	Safe
7	Mila Miller	"Try a Little Tenderness" (Otis Redding)	Bottom 4
8	Annika Odegard	"Super Duper Love" (Joss Stone)	Safe
9	Khalila Glanville	"I Can't Help Myself (Sugar Pie Honey Bunch)" (Four Tops)	Bottom 4

=== Top 14 ===
==== Men ====
Order	Contestant	Song (original artist)	Result
1	Matt Rapley	"I'll Be There" (The Jackson 5)	Safe
2	Greg Neufeld	"Daughters" (John Mayer)	Safe
3	Tyler Mullendore	"Rock'n Me" (Steve Miller Band)	Eliminated
4	Liam Styles Chang	"Over My Head (Cable Car)" (The Fray)	Eliminated
5	Dwight d'Eon	"Bright Lights" (Matchbox Twenty)	Safe
6	Jaydee Bixby	"Sold (The Grundy County Auction Incident)" (John Michael Montgomery)	Safe
7	Brian Melo	"Drive" (Incubus)	Safe

==== Women ====
Order	Contestant	Song (original artist)	Result
1	Annika Odegard	"Ordinary Day" (Vanessa Carlton)	Eliminated
2	Khalila Glanville	"For You I Will" (Monica)	Safe
3	Carly Rae Jepsen	"Waiting in Vain" (Annie Lennox)	Safe
4	Tara Oram	"When God-Fearin' Women Get the Blues" (Martina McBride)	Safe
5	Montana Martin Iles	"Ironic" (Alanis Morissette)	Eliminated
6	Martha Joy	"That's the Way It Is" (Celine Dion)	Safe
7	Mila Miller	"Rehab" (Amy Winehouse)	Safe

== Top 10, The Finals ==
After the Semi-Finals, the final 10 competitors are faced with a new theme challenge every week. Based on public voting, one finalist is eliminated each week. The season finale of Canadian Idol took place on September 11, 2007. Brian Melo from Hamilton, Ontario is 2007 Canadian Idol.

=== Finalists ===
- Brian Melo (born August 15, 1982, in Hamilton, Ontario, 24 years old during the season), is a construction worker from Hamilton, Ontario. He is the only contestant who received a standing ovation from all the judges. He is the Canadian Idol for 2007.
- Jaydee Bixby (born August 14, 1990, in Drumheller, Alberta, 17 years old during the season), is a student and performer from Drumheller, Alberta. He was the only member of the season's Top 10 who had never been in the bottom 3 or 2. He is the 2007 runner-up to Canadian Idol, Brian Melo.
- Carly Rae Jepsen (born November 21, 1985, in Mission, British Columbia, 21 years old during the season), is a student from Mission, British Columbia. In Season 5, she was the last girl standing.
- Dwight d'Eon (born December 18, 1978, 28 years old during the season), is a musician and lobster fisherman from West Pubnico, Nova Scotia.
- Matt Rapley (born March 13, 1988, 18 years old during the season), is a student from Regina, Saskatchewan.
- Tara Oram (born April 28, 1984, 23 years old during the season), is a singer from Hare Bay, Newfoundland and Labrador. She was never placed in the Bottom 3 or 2 until her night of elimination.
- Greg Neufeld (born February 1, 1984, 23 years old during the season), is a singer/songwriter and house framer from Abbotsford, British Columbia. He had made the Top 22 during Season Four, but had been eliminated from the competition in the second week of voting. Regarded as a favorite in Season 5, his elimination caused controversy, in part because of host Ben Mulroney's comment ("Canada got it wrong") upon his elimination.
- Martha Joy (born December 8, 1990, in Toronto, Ontario, 16 years old during the season), is a student from Toronto, Ontario.
- Khalila Glanville (born July 12, 1983, 23 years old during the season), is a daycare worker from Dorval, Quebec.
- Kamila Miller (also known as Mila Miller) (born December 1, 1989, 17 years old during the season), is a student from Woodbridge, Ontario. Despite writing the lyrics to a song on her hands during the final phase of Toronto Week, she was able to impress the judges with her vocal ability.

== Finals ==
=== Top 10 – #1 Hits ===
Order	Contestant	Song (original artist)	Result
1	Dwight d'Eon	"Unwell" (Matchbox Twenty)	Safe
2	Khalila Glanville	"Killing Me Softly" (The Fugees)	Bottom 2
3	Carly Rae Jepsen	"Inside and Out" (Feist)	Bottom 3
4	Brian Melo	"If You Could Only See" (Tonic)	Safe
5	Mila Miller	"Signed, Sealed, Delivered I'm Yours" (Stevie Wonder)	Eliminated
6	Jaydee Bixby	"It's Only Make Believe" (Conway Twitty)	Safe
7	Greg Neufeld	"All These Things That I've Done" (The Killers)	Safe
8	Martha Joy	"The Power of Love" (Jennifer Rush)	Safe
9	Tara Oram	"You Win My Love" (Shania Twain)	Safe
10	Matt Rapley	"I Heard It Through the Grapevine" (Marvin Gaye)	Safe

=== Top 9 – The 60s ===
Order	Contestant	Song (original artist)	Result
1	Jaydee Bixby	"Runaway" (Del Shannon)	Safe
2	Tara Oram	"Suspicious Minds" (Elvis Presley)	Safe
3	Matt Rapley	"Whipping Post" (The Allman Brothers Band)	Safe
4	Dwight d'Eon	"Undun" (The Guess Who)	Safe
5	Carly Rae Jepsen	"Georgia on My Mind" (Ray Charles)	Safe
6	Brian Melo	"Bold as Love" (Jimi Hendrix)	Bottom 2
7	Khalila Glanville	"(You Make Me Feel Like) A Natural Woman" (Aretha Franklin)	Eliminated
8	Greg Neufeld	"Long Black Veil" (Johnny Cash)	Safe
9	Martha Joy	"Love Child" (The Supremes)	Bottom 3

=== Top 8 – Unplugged ===
Order	Contestant	Song (original artist)	Result
1	Martha Joy	"True Colors" (Cyndi Lauper)	Eliminated
2	Dwight d'Eon	"Every Breath You Take" (The Police)	Safe
3	Jaydee Bixby	"Good Riddance (Time of Your Life)" (Green Day)	Safe
4	Tara Oram	"Heaven" (Bryan Adams)	Safe
5	Brian Melo	"She Talks to Angels" (The Black Crowes)	Safe
6	Matt Rapley	"Ain't No Sunshine" (Bill Withers)	Bottom 2
7	Carly Rae Jepsen	"Torn" (Natalie Imbruglia)	Safe
8	Greg Neufeld	"I'm Ready" (Bryan Adams)	Safe

=== Top 7 – Queen ===
Order	Contestant	Song	Result
1	Brian Melo	"Too Much Love Will Kill You"	Bottom 2
2	Greg Neufeld	"We Are the Champions"	Eliminated
3	Carly Rae Jepsen	"Killer Queen"	Bottom 3
4	Matt Rapley	"Under Pressure"	Safe
5	Dwight d'Eon	"Tie Your Mother Down"	Safe
6	Tara Oram	"Headlong"	Safe
7	Jaydee Bixby	"I Want to Break Free"	Safe

=== Top 6 – Pop/Rock ===
Order	Contestant	Song (original artist)	Result
1	Tara Oram	"Walking on Sunshine" (Katrina and the Waves)	Eliminated
2	Jaydee Bixby	"Amazed" (Lonestar)	Safe
3	Matt Rapley	"Everything" (Michael Bublé)	Safe
4	Carly Rae Jepsen	"Come to My Window" (Melissa Etheridge)	Bottom 3
5	Brian Melo	"The Dolphin's Cry" (Live)	Safe
6	Dwight d'Eon	"Smooth" (Santana & Rob Thomas)	Bottom 3

=== Top 5 – My Own Idol ===
Order	Contestant	Song (original artist)	Result
1	Matt Rapley	"Higher Ground" (Stevie Wonder)	Eliminated
2	Dwight d'Eon	"Bed of Roses" (Bon Jovi)	Bottom 2
3	Jaydee Bixby	"I Can't Stop Loving You" (Don Gibson)	Safe
4	Carly Rae Jepsen	"Chuck E's In Love" (Rickie Lee Jones)	Safe
5	Brian Melo	"Karma Police" (Radiohead)	Safe

=== Top 4 – Standards ===
Order	Contestant	Song (original artist)	Result
1	Carly Rae Jepsen	"My Heart Belongs to Daddy" (Mary Martin)	Safe
2	Jaydee Bixby	"Fever" (Michael Bublé)	Safe
3	Brian Melo	"Mack the Knife" (Bobby Darin)	Safe
4	Dwight d'Eon	"I Get a Kick Out of You" (Frank Sinatra)	Eliminated
5	Carly Rae Jepsen	"I Got It Bad (and That Ain't Good)" (Ivie Anderson)	Safe
6	Jaydee Bixby	"When You're Smiling" (Louis Prima)	Safe
7	Brian Melo	"Feeling Good" (Nina Simone)	Safe
8	Dwight d'Eon	"Unforgettable" (Nat King Cole)	Eliminated

=== Top 3 – Judge's Choice & People's Choice ===
Order	Contestant	Song (original artist)	Result
1	Jaydee Bixby	"Break It to Them Gently" (Burton Cummings)	Safe
2	Brian Melo	"A Whiter Shade of Pale" (Procol Harum)	Safe
3	Carly Rae Jepsen	"At Seventeen" (Janis Ian)	Eliminated
4	Jaydee Bixby	"Ring of Fire" (Johnny Cash)	Safe
5	Brian Melo	"Lightning Crashes" (Live)	Safe
6	Carly Rae Jepsen	"White Flag" (Dido)	Eliminated

=== Finale ===
Each contestant sang three songs.

Order	Contestant	Song (original artist)	Result
1	Jaydee Bixby	"Who Says You Can't Go Home" (Bon Jovi)	Runner-Up
2	Brian Melo	"This Ain't a Love Song" (Bon Jovi)	Winner
3	Jaydee Bixby	"All I Ever Wanted"	Runner-Up
4	Brian Melo	"All I Ever Wanted"	Winner
5	Jaydee Bixby	"It's Not Unusual" (Tom Jones)	Runner-Up
6	Brian Melo	"Hallelujah" (Leonard Cohen)	Winner

=== Song themes ===
Each week, a song theme will be presented to the competitors. Each competitor must base their song choice on the theme of the week.

- July 17 – #1 Hits
- July 24 – Music of the 1960s
- July 31 – Unplugged (Acoustic music)
- August 7 – Queen
- August 14 – Pop-Rock
- August 21 – My Own Idol (artists who inspire the contestants)
- August 28 – Standards
- September 4 – Judges choice & People choice
- September 11- Season Finale

=== Help the Idols Build a House ===
It is a fundraising campaign that will help build the first North American Ronald McDonald Family Retreat at Bear Mountain Resort in Victoria, British Columbia. The sales of the Canadian Idol single, "Believe in You" will be donated to the Ronald McDonald House Charities. Canadian Idol announced on the Season Finale that they raised over $1 Million.

== 2007 Elimination Chart ==
Contestants are in reverse chronological order of elimination.

Legend
Female	Male	Top 10	Top 22

Stage:		Semi-Finals			Finals								
Week:		6/27	7/4	7/11	7/18	7/25	8/1	8/8	8/15	8/22	8/29	9/5	9/11
Place	Contestant	Result											
1	Brian Melo		Btm 3			Btm 2		Btm 2					Winner
2	Jaydee Bixby												Runner-up
3	Carly Rae Jepsen				Btm 3			Btm 3	Btm 3			Elim	
4	Dwight d'Eon		Btm 4						Btm 3	Btm 2	Elim		
5	Matt Rapley						Btm 2			Elim			
6	Tara Oram								Elim				
7	Greg Neufeld							Elim					
8	Martha Joy					Btm 3	Elim						
9	Khalila Glanville		Btm 4		Btm 3	Elim							
10	Kamila Miller	Btm 3	Btm 3		Elim								
11–14	Annika Odegard			Elim									
11–14	Liam Styles Chang			Elim									
11–14	Montana Martin Iles			Elim									
11–14	Tyler Mullendore			Elim									
15–18	Andrew Austin	Btm 3	Elim										
15–18	Clifton Murray	Btm 4	Elim										
15–18	Naomi-Joy Blackhall	Btm 4	Elim										
15–18	Scarlett Burke		Elim										
19–22	Christine Hanlon	Elim											
19–22	Derek Hoffman	Elim											
19–22	Justyn Wesley	Elim											
19–22	Maud Coussa-Jandl	Elim											
