= Ryan Malcolm discography =

- Studio albums: 1
- Singles: 3
- Music videos: 1

This is the discography of Canadian Idol first season winner and Low Level Flight vocalist Ryan Malcolm. In his career, Ryan has released one solo studio album, one solo single, two LLF album, and three LLF singles. He also starred in six music videos.

== Albums ==
=== Studio albums ===
Year	Album details	Peak	Certifications (sales threshold)
Year	Album details	CA	Certifications (sales threshold)
2003	Home: Released: December 9, 2003; Label: Sony BMG; Format: CD	4	CAN: Platinum

== Singles ==
Year	Single	Peak	Album
Year	Single	CAN	Album
2003	"Something More"	1	Home
2004	"Star of All the Planets"	79	Home
2004	"You Made This Fool Become a Man"	—	Home
"—" denotes the song failed to chart.

== Low Level Flight discography ==
=== Studio albums ===
Year	Album details	Peak	Certifications (sales threshold)
Year	Album details	CA	Certifications (sales threshold)
2007	Urgency: Release date: March 27, 2007; Label: I Heart Records/Times of India; Format: CD, digital download	—	CAN: 8,500; IND: 3,500
2011	Through These Walls: Release date: May 8, 2011; Label: I Heart Records/Brave Rekords; Format: LP, digital download	—	
"—" denotes the album failed to chart.

=== Singles ===
Year	Single	Peak			Album
Year	Single	CAN	CAN Alt	Much	Album
2007	"Change for Me"	69	35	—	Urgency
2007	"Say"	22	7	—	Urgency
2008	"Turnaround"	—	—	—	Urgency
2011	"Cash Machine"	35	22	—	Through These Walls
2011	"Brooklyn Radio"	—	31	5	Through These Walls
"—" denotes the song failed to chart.

== Music videos ==
Year	Single	Album
2003	"Something More"	Home
2007	"Change For Me"	Urgency
2007	"Say"	Urgency
2008	"Turnaround"	Urgency
2011	"Cash Machine"	Through These Walls
2011	"Brooklyn Radio"	Through These Walls
