= Klippert =

Klippert is a surname of German origin. Notable people with the surname include:

- Billy Klippert, Canadian rock singer-songwriter
- Brad Klippert (born 1957), American politician
- George Klippert (1926-1996), Canadian gay man
- Serhiy Klippert (born 1989), Ukrainian Paralympic swimmer
