= Ashley Coulter =

- Born: April 26, 1983 (age 43); Emeryville, Ontario, Canada
- Occupation: Singer
- Years active: 2006–present
- Formerly of: Nemesis
- Website: www.myspace.com/ashesband

Ashley Coulter (born April 26, 1983) is a Canadian singer and the sixth-place finalist in the 2006 season of Canadian Idol. She was born and raised in Emeryville, Ontario (near Windsor), but lives in Toronto, Ontario.

== Canadian Idol ==
Before her debut on Canadian Idol in late May 2006, she worked as a cashier in London: most recently at The Real Canadian Superstore in northwest London for about two months, and previously at Angelo's Bakery & Deli, also in northwest London. Both stores displayed signs of support outside their establishments during Coulter's tenure on Idol.

Prior to auditioning for Idol, Coulter was a singer in a local rock band called Nemesis. She auditioned in Kitchener, where she claimed to be "better than [the] bar singer" that judge Farley Flex proclaimed her to be; Coulter was backed up by judge Zack Werner who supported her.

Coulter's performances on Canadian Idol include:

1. Top 22: Bring It On Home to Me (Sam Cooke)
2. Top 18: I'm the Only One (Melissa Etheridge) – Bottom 4 07/05/06
3. Top 14: Crazy (Patsy Cline)
4. Top 10: American Woman (The Guess Who) – Bottom 2 07/18/06
5. Top 9: Gimme Shelter (Rolling Stones) – Bottom 2 07/25/06
6. Top 8: Eternal Flame (The Bangles)
7. Top 7: Knockin' on Heaven's Door (Bob Dylan)
8. Top 6: Crying (Roy Orbison) – Eliminated 08/15/06

== Post-Idol career ==
In an interview on London radio station CJBK following her elimination, Coulter stated that she does not intend to return to working as a cashier and wishes to continue pursuing her music career. She has since begun recording as a solo artist under the name Ashes, performing in and around the GTA. She worked at Steve's Music Store, Toronto.

Ashes collaborated with Canadian artist Classified on his album Handshakes and Middle Fingers, contributing vocals to the single "That Aint Classy". The single became available on Classified's website January 31, 2011.
