= Tyler Hamilton (disambiguation) =

Tyler Hamilton may refer to:

- Tyler Hamilton (born 1971) former bicycle racer.
- Tyler Hamilton (footballer) (born 1999), English footballer
- Tyler Hamilton (reporter) (born 1970), Canadian reporter
- Tyler Hamilton (singer), Canadian singer
