= Canadian Idol =

Television program

- Created by: Simon Fuller
- Directed by: Joan Tosoni
- Presented by: Ben Mulroney (2003–2008); Jon Dore (2003–2005); Elena Juatco (2006); Dave Kerr (2007); Jully Black (2008)
- Judges: Sass Jordan; Farley Flex; Zack Werner; Jake Gold
- Country of origin: Canada
- Original language: English
- No. of seasons: 6
- No. of episodes: 186

Production
- Executive producers: John Brunton; Barbara Bowlby
- Running time: Varies
- Production companies: Insight Productions; FremantleMedia North America; 19 Entertainment

Original release
- Network: CTV
- Release: June 9, 2003 – September 10, 2008

Related
- The Launch

Canadian Idol is a Canadian reality television competition show which aired on CTV, based on the British show Pop Idol. The show was a competition to find the most talented young singer in Canada, and was hosted by Ben Mulroney. Jon Dore was the "roving reporter" for the first three seasons (appearing in comedy skits throughout the show). Elena Juatco (a season 2 contestant) assumed the role for season four, Dave Kerr had the role in season five and Jully Black in season six.

The show began with a cross-Canada tour in which singers audition in front of four judges: Jake Gold of Toronto, Sass Jordan of Montreal, Quebec, Zack Werner of Winnipeg, Manitoba, and Farley Flex of Ajax, Ontario. Eventually the performers were narrowed down to 10 finalists (11 in season one due to a near-tie), with each competitor performing live. Viewers had two hours following the broadcast of the show to phone in their votes for their favourite competitor. On the following night's episode (live again), the competitor with the fewest votes was sent home. After the final two perform, viewers had more than two hours to vote. The next day (five days later in season 4; two days later in season 6), the competitor with the most votes was declared the winner. The show was taped at the John Bassett Theatre in Toronto, Ontario.

In December 2008, CTV announced that Canadian Idol would be "suspended", not airing in the 2009 season due to "the current economic climate". At that time, the network stated that it expected the show would return in 2010. However, CTV has not made any further announcement regarding the series since that time, and the series is now generally considered to have been cancelled. Following the announcement of the show's suspension, Joel Rubinoff, television critic for the Waterloo Region Record, strongly criticized the show's direction, declaring that it had "bottomed out creatively in every possible way" and "outlived its usefulness".

== Final results ==
In its six seasons, the winners and runners-up were:

| Year | Winner | Runner-up |
|---|---|---|
| 2003 | Ryan Malcolm | Gary Beals |
| 2004 | Kalan Porter | Theresa Sokyrka |
| 2005 | Melissa O'Neil | Rex Goudie |
| 2006 | Eva Avila | Craig Sharpe |
| 2007 | Brian Melo | Jaydee Bixby |
| 2008 | Theo Tams | Mitch MacDonald |

== Season 1 ==
In the first season, which debuted on June 9, 2003, Ryan Malcolm of Kingston, Ontario won, with Gary Beals of Dartmouth, Nova Scotia coming in second. Malcolm released his debut album entitled "Home" in October 2003, which included his first single from Canadian Idol: "Something More". In fact, eight members of the Season One Top 11 have now released their own solo albums, including Gary Beals, Billy Klippert, Audrey De Montigny, Jenny Gear, Toya Alexis, Mikey Bustos, and Karen Lee Batten.

Auditions were held in Toronto, Montreal, Vancouver, Ottawa, Calgary, Winnipeg, Halifax, and St. John's.

| Date | Theme | Bottom Four | | | |
|---|---|---|---|---|---|
| August 5 | Canadian Hits | Richie Wilcox | Candida Clauseri | Karen-Lee Batten | Toya Alexis |
| | | Bottom Three | | | |
| August 12 | Motown | Mikey Bustos | Tyler Hamilton | Billy Klippert | |
| August 19 | Summertime Hits | Toya Alexis (2) | Audrey De Montigny | Gary Beals | |
| | | Bottom Two | | | |
| August 26 | Elton John | Jenny Gear | Ryan Malcolm | | |
| September 2 | Love Songs | Audrey de Montigny (2) | Gary Beals (2) | | |
| September 9 | Judges' Choice | Billy Klippert (2) | | | |
| September 16 | Final Two | Gary Beals (3) | Ryan Malcolm (1) | | |

Canadian Idol
Canadian Idol Finalists (with dates of elimination)
Season 1 (2003)
| Ryan Malcolm | Winner |
| Gary Beals | September 16 |
| Billy Klippert | September 9 |
| Audrey de Montigny | September 2 |
| Jenny Gear | August 26 |
| Toya Alexis | August 19 |
| Tyler Hamilton | August 12 |
| Mikey Bustos | August 12 |
| Karen-Lee Batten | August 5 |
| Candida Clauseri | August 5 |
| Richie Wilcox | August 5 |
Season 2 (2004)
| Kalan Porter | Winner |
| Theresa Sokyrka | September 16 |
| Jacob Hoggard | September 9 |
| Jason Greeley | September 2 |
| Shane Wiebe | August 26 |
| Elena Juatco | August 19 |
| Kaleb Simmonds | August 12 |
| Joshua Seller | August 5 |
| Manoah Hartmann | July 29 |
| Brandy Callahan | July 22 |
Season 3 (2005)
| Melissa O'Neil | Winner |
| Rex Goudie | September 14 |
| Aaron Walpole | September 7 |
| Suzi Rawn | August 31 |
| Casey LeBlanc | August 24 |
| Josh Palmer | August 17 |
| Daryl Brunt | August 10 |
| Amber Fleury | August 3 |
| Ashley Leitao | July 27 |
| Emily Vinette | July 20 |
Season 4 (2006)
| Eva Avila | Winner |
| Craig Sharpe | September 17 |
| Tyler Lewis | September 5 |
| Chad Doucette | August 29 |
| Steffi DiDomenicantonio | August 22 |
| Ashley Coulter | August 15 |
| Rob James | August 8 |
| Brandon Jones | August 1 |
| Sarah Loverock | July 25 |
| Kati Durst | July 18 |
Season 5 (2007)
| Brian Melo | Winner |
| Jaydee Bixby | September 11 |
| Carly Rae Jepsen | September 4 |
| Dwight d'Eon | August 28 |
| Matt Rapley | August 21 |
| Tara Oram | August 14 |
| Greg Neufeld | August 7 |
| Martha Joy | July 31 |
| Khalila Glanville | July 24 |
| Mila Miller | July 17 |
Season 6 (2008)
| Theo Tams | Winner |
| Mitch MacDonald | September 10 |
| Drew Wright | September 2 |
| Earl Stevenson | August 26 |
| Mookie Morris | August 19 |
| Amberly Thiessen | August 12 |
| Mark Day | August 5 |
| Sebastian Pigott | July 29 |
| Katherine St-Laurent | July 22 |
| Adam Castelli | July 15 |

== Season 2 ==
The second season of Canadian Idol debuted on June 1, 2004, and became the most-watched show in Canada, drawing in over 3 million viewers each week.

Auditions were held in Toronto, Montreal, Vancouver, Ottawa, Edmonton, Winnipeg, Halifax, Regina, and St. John's. The season provided an Idol franchise first when the final six contestants played their own instruments during a group performance of the Gordon Lightfoot classic "Canadian Railroad Trilogy".

Kalan Porter of Medicine Hat, Alberta won the series, and Theresa Sokyrka of Saskatoon, Saskatchewan was the runner-up. In November 2004, merely two months after the competition, Porter released his debut album entitled 219 Days – the number of days spanning from his first audition to the release of his CD. It was certified double platinum within two months and he received three Juno nominations. Porter also won Fan Favourite Canadian Artist at the MuchMusic Video Awards. Other competitors from Season Two's Top 10 who have released albums include: Sokyrka, Jacob Hoggard (four albums with his band Hedley), Jason Greeley, Shane Wiebe, and Joshua Seller. Porter is the first CI winner to have a second CD released by Sony BMG (Wake Up Living launched August 28, 2007). Jacob Hoggard released his second album (Universal) with his band, Hedley; the album's first single, "She's So Sorry", was released to radio August 20, 2007.

| Date | Theme | Bottom Three | | |
|---|---|---|---|---|
| July 22 | Canadian Hits | Brandy Callahan | Manoah Hartmann | Joshua Seller |
| July 29 | British Invasion | Manoah Hartmann (2) | Shane Wiebe | Kaleb Simmonds |
| August 5 | Rock & Roll | Joshua Seller (2) | Shane Wiebe (2) | Elena Juatco |
| August 12 | Lionel Richie | Kaleb Simmonds (2) | Elena Juatco (2) | Shane Wiebe (3) |
| August 19 | Gordon Lightfoot | Elena Juatco (3) | Jacob Hoggard | Shane Wiebe (4) |
| | | Bottom Two | | |
| August 26 | Summertime Hits | Shane Wiebe (5) | Jason Greeley | |
| September 2 | Standards | Jason Greeley (2) | Theresa Sokyrka | |
| September 9 | Judges' Choice | Jacob Hoggard (2) | | |
| September 16 | Final Two | Theresa Sokyrka (2) | Kalan Porter | |

== Season 3 ==
In December 2004, CTV announced that they would be producing a third season of Canadian Idol in 2005. Auditions began in February and finished in April 2005 and the show debuted May 30, just days after the conclusion of the fourth season of American Idol but did not follow suit yet on the new change to that show.

Auditions were held in Toronto, Montreal, Vancouver, Ottawa, Calgary, Winnipeg, London, Sudbury, Saskatoon, St. John's, Moncton, Charlottetown, Sydney, and Whitehorse.

This season introduced a twist in the Wildcard semi-final round. On the group 4 results show, after the results were revealed, 11 previous competitors were brought out. (CTV had advertised the broadcast as having 12 competitors, but one dropped out at the last minute.) The judges expressed how they felt about each competitor, and each competitor had a chance to show why they should sing in the Wildcard, whether it be through song or a plea. Then, the public had a chance to vote which would decide which of the 11 competitors would sing in the Wildcard.

After the final, Melissa O'Neil of Calgary, Alberta was crowned the winner; with Rex Goudie of Burlington, Newfoundland and Labrador the runner-up. Melissa O'Neil, Rex Goudie, Aaron Walpole, and Suzi Rawn have released albums; while Casey LeBlanc, Ashley Leitao and Amber Fleury have released an album as a group called Braided. Josh Palmer is also working on an album release.

| Date | Theme | Bottom Three | | |
|---|---|---|---|---|
| July 19 | Canadian Hits | Emily Vinette | Daryl Brunt | Melissa O'Neil |
| July 20 | Stevie Wonder | Ashley Leitao | Melissa O'Neil (2) | Josh Palmer |
| August 3 | The 1980s | Amber Fleury | Suzi Rawn | Josh Palmer (2) |
| August 10 | Big Band | Daryl Brunt (2) | Aaron Walpole | Casey LeBlanc |
| August 17 | Classic rock | Josh Palmer (3) | Suzi Rawn (2) | Rex Goudie |
| | | Bottom Two | | |
| August 24 | The Guess Who | Casey LeBlanc (2) | Suzi Rawn (3) | |
| August 31 | Elvis Presley | Suzi Rawn (4) | | |
| September 7 | Barenaked Ladies | Aaron Walpole (2) | | |
| September 14 | Final Two | Rex Goudie (2) | Melissa O'Neil (2) | |

== Season 4 ==
In January 2006, CTV announced their plans for a fourth season of Canadian Idol. An 11-week audition tour took place in February, March and April 2006. Auditions were held in Toronto, Montreal, Vancouver, Ottawa, Edmonton, Winnipeg, Kitchener-Waterloo, Halifax, Regina, St. John's, and Yellowknife. Season two competitor Elena Juatco joined the show as the roving reporter, while Jon Dore did not return for the fourth season. The season premiered on May 29, five days after the finale of American Idol Season 5. The season finale of Canadian Idol took place on Sunday, September 17, 2006. The finale, originally scheduled for Tuesday, September 12, was moved to help resolve a conflict with ABC's 'Dancing with the Stars', which CTV also carried and which ABC announced would debut September 12. Eva Avila took the title in the closest final vote to date; CTV announced that 3.3% -- which amounted to 131,000 votes—separated her from Newfoundland's Craig Sharpe.

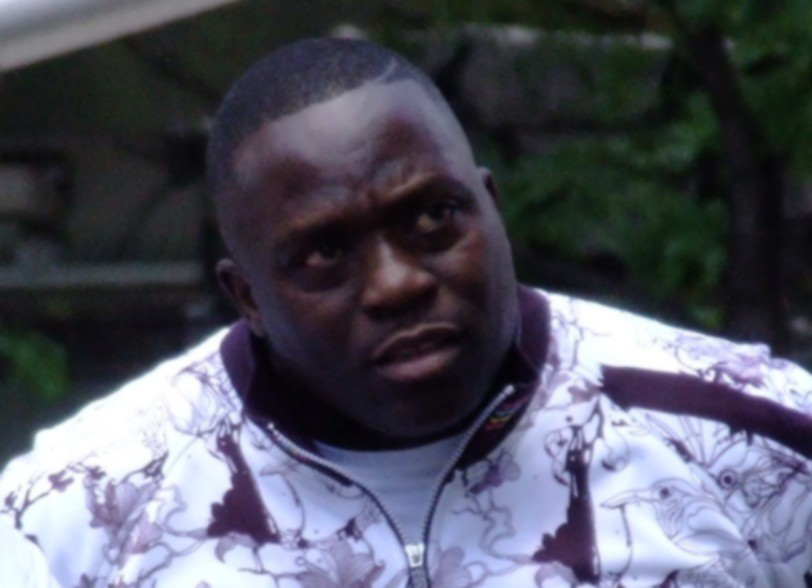
Farley Flex, a judge for Canadian Idol

On Saturday, September 16, 2006, a day prior to the public announcement of the Idol results, Sony BMG Music Entertainment began offering Avila's version of the first single, Meant to Fly, for sale on the website EvaAvila.com. Although the page was subsequently blanked, the artwork for the single can currently be located within the image files of the webpage. This occurrence led to the creation of many rumours regarding the winner of the competition. Both Avila's and Sharpe's singles were made available for pre-order for the September 26, 2006 release date on Amazon.

As of 2009, Eva Avila ('Somewhere Else' and 'Give Me the Music'), Craig Sharpe ('I Am'), Chad Doucette ('Hit It'), Tyler Lewis ('I'm Coming Home'), and Brandon Jones ('All for You') had all launched debut CDs.

| Date | Theme | Bottom Three | | |
|---|---|---|---|---|
| July 17 | Canadian Hits | Kati Durst | Ashley Coulter (2) | Steffi D (2) |
| July 24 | Rolling Stones | Sarah Loverock | Ashley Coulter (3) | Steffi D (3) |
| July 31 | The 1980s | Brandon Jones | Chad Doucette | Eva Avila |
| | | Bottom Two | | |
| August 7 | Classic Rock | Rob James | Steffi D (4) | |
| | | Bottom Three | | |
| August 14 | Unplugged | Ashley Coulter (4) | Craig Sharpe | Steffi D (5) |
| | | Bottom Two | | |
| August 21 | Country Standards | Steffi D (6) | Eva Avila (2) | |
| August 28 | Judges' Choice | Chad Doucette (2) | Tyler Lewis | |
| September 4 | Standards | Tyler Lewis (2) | | |
| September 11 | Final Two | Craig Sharpe (2) | Eva Avila (2) | |

== Season 5 ==
In December 2006, CTV announced the plans for the fifth season of Canadian Idol. The audition tour began in Vancouver on February 3, and visited nine more cities across Canada in a 10-week trip. This year, the network announced that the auditioners can play along with their instrument in their audition. The network also indicated that Dave Kerr will replace Elena Juatco in the co-hosting role for Season Five. Season Five premiered on June 5, 2007. On July 11, 2007 Canadian Idol voters picked their top ten. On September 4, 2007 these were narrowed down to the final two, Jaydee Bixby and Brian Melo. On September 11, 2007, Brian Melo was voted the winner. Placing 3rd was Carly Rae Jepsen, globally the best selling Canadian Idol alum to-date.

| Date | Theme | Bottom Three | | |
|---|---|---|---|---|
| July 17 | #1 Hits | Mila Miller (2) | Carly Rae Jepsen | Khalila Glanville (2) |
| July 23 | The 1960s | Khalila Glanville (3) | Brian Melo (2) | Martha Joy |
| | | Bottom Two | | |
| July 30 | Unplugged | Martha Joy (2) | Matt Rapley | |
| | | Bottom Three | | |
| August 6 | Queen | Greg Neufeld | Brian Melo (3) | Carly Rae Jepsen (2) |
| August 13 | Pop-Rock | Tara Oram | Carly Rae Jepsen (3) | Dwight d'Eon (2) |
| | | Bottom Two | | |
| August 20 | My Own Idol | Matt Rapley (2) | Dwight d'Eon (3) | |
| August 27 | Standards | Dwight d'Eon (4) | | |
| September 3 | Judges'/Peoples' Choice | Carly Rae Jepsen (4) | | |
| September 10 | Final Two | Jaydee Bixby | Brian Melo (4) | |

== Season 6 ==
In January 2008, CTV announced the plans for the sixth season of Canadian Idol. The sixth season held auditions in Edmonton, Calgary, Vancouver, Winnipeg, Hamilton, Ottawa, Montreal, Halifax, St. John's, and Toronto. In addition to the auditions, contestants who failed to advance to the next round or were unable to make it to an audition on the scheduled date were able to audition via cyberspace by uploading their 2-minute audition to the show's website. This was the first season to feature a top 24 instead of top 22 along with an uneven number of men and women in the cast. The Canadian voters selected their Top 10 on July 9, 2008, and chose Theo Tams as the winner in the finale, which aired September 10.

| Date | Theme | Bottom Three | | |
|---|---|---|---|---|
| July 14 | David Bowie | Adam Castelli (2) | Sebastian Pigott | Mookie Morris |
| July 21 | Rock and Roll Heaven | Katherine St-Laurent | Sebastian Pigott (2) | Amberly Thiessen |
| July 28 | Unplugged | Sebastian Pigott (3) | Mookie Morris (2) | Mark Day |
| August 4 | Top 10 UK Hits | Mark Day (2) | Earl Stevenson | Theo Tams |
| August 11 | Canadian Rock | Amberly Thiessen (2) | Earl Stevenson (2) | Drew Wright |
| | | Bottom Two | | |
| August 18 | Judges Choice of Beatles songs | Mookie Morris (3) | Drew Wright (2) | |
| August 25 | Anne Murray + Free choice | Earl Stevenson (3) | | |
| September 1 | Bryan Adams | Drew Wright (3) | | |
| September 8 | Final Two | Mitch MacDonald | Theo Tams (1) | |

== See also ==
- Canada's Got Talent
- La Voix
- The Rehearsal
- Music of Canada
