= Richie Wilcox =

Canadian theatre director and musician

- Born: 1980 (age 45–46); New Waterford, Nova Scotia, Canada
- Occupations: Singer, actor, theatre director

Richie Wilcox (born 1980) is a Canadian theatre director, singer and performer who - alongside his husband and collaborator Aaron Collier - currently helms Heist, a live art company committed to creating, producing and presenting innovative, genre-bending and queerly playful performances. Wilcox is also the current Artistic Producer at the Ship's Company Theatre.

Wilcox was a contestant on the first season of reality television show Canadian Idol.

== Early life ==
Born in New Waterford, Nova Scotia, Wilcox's first national performance came on a Rita MacNeil Christmas television special when he was nine years old.

== Education ==
Wilcox subsequently studied drama at University College of Cape Breton (now Cape Breton University) and Dalhousie University, graduating with honours from the Theatre Studies program at University of King's College. He completed his master's degree in Theatre Direction at Texas State University in San Marcos, Texas. He is pursuing a PhD in theatre at York University in Toronto, where he taught Second Year Devised theatre.

== Career ==
In 2003, on the first season of Canadian Idol, Richie Wilcox finished in a three-way tie for eighth place. He was eliminated after the first week of Top 11 performances, although fellow Halifax singer Gary Beals went on to finish in second place.

Before Idol, he was assistant manager of a deli. After Idol, from 2003 to 2005, Wilcox wrote a weekly column about reality shows for The Daily News.

Wilcox has performed in and directed numerous theatre productions in Halifax. He co-founded independent theatre company, Angels & Heroes. After four increasingly successful seasons with the indie troupe and two summers acting and directing in a company called Festival Antigonish, Wilcox went on to complete a master's degree in Theatre Direction at Texas State University in San Marcos, Texas before returning to Halifax in 2007. He won a Merritt Award for Emerging Theatre Artist in 2007.

In 2024, he had a supporting role as a therapist in Taylor Olson's film Look at Me.

== Personal life ==
Wilcox is gay.
