= Ryan Malcolm =

Canadian singer and realtor

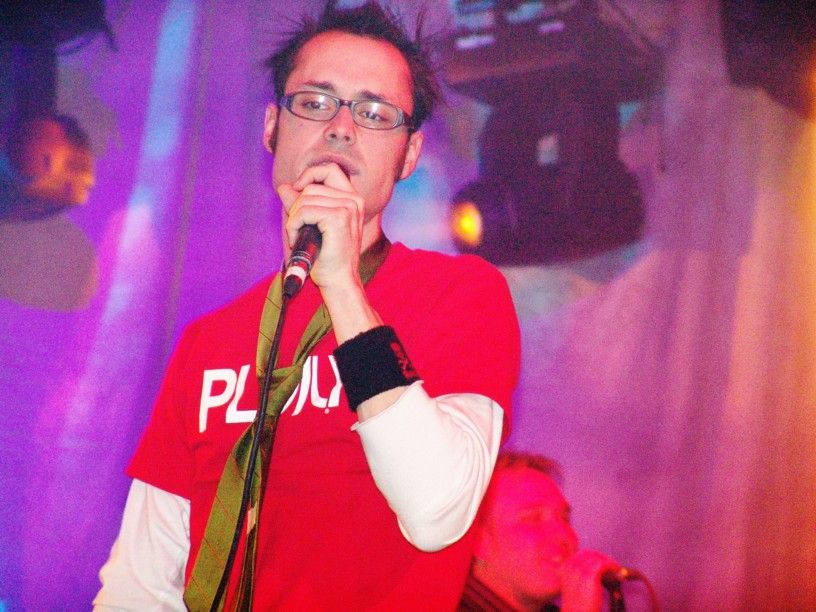
- Ryan Malcolm, March 2004

Background information
- Born: Ryan Michael Malcolm; October 13, 1979 (age 46)
- Origin: Kingston, Ontario, Canada
- Occupation: Singer
- Label: BMG International

Ryan Michael Malcolm (born October 13, 1979) is a Canadian singer and realtor best known as the winner of the first season of Canadian Idol.

In 2003, he released his debut solo album Home which was certified Platinum in Canada. In 2006, Malcolm formed a new alternative rock band, Low Level Flight.

== Biography ==
=== Early years ===
Ryan grew up in Amherstview, a small town just west of Kingston. The son of John and Sharron Malcolm, Ryan had two older siblings, Kim and Sean. At the age of nine, Ryan's parents were divorced and then John remarried. His wife Deborah had three children, and Ryan had three new step-siblings, Jordan, Reagan, and Grayson. Throughout the 1990s, Ryan's father owned and operated many restaurants, where Ryan worked as a waiter, setting up his nickname on idol as "waiter boy", in reference to the pop singer Avril Lavigne's song "Sk8er Boi". Both Malcolm and Lavigne attended the same high school in Napanee. Ryan had his musical debut singing at guest appearance with his Dad John, who had a solo vocal act. When John and his step-mom Deb opened their restaurant in Napanee, Ryan, 13 at the time, started singing regularly with his Dad. Later brother Reagan joined the act, and the band "A Bit of Nostalgia" was born.

Ryan continued singing with "A Bit of Nostalgia" until he won Idol. Presently, he enjoys coming home for reunion shows with his Dad and brother Reagan, for special events. Before entering Canadian Idol, he also worked as a waiter at the Lone Star Texas Grill in Kingston.

=== Canadian Idol ===
Malcolm did not crack the top 10 in his first attempt but was awarded a spot on the wildcard show after which, because the vote was so close, he became the 11th contestant in the final group. His consistency throughout the final phase of the competition and his great song choices won him many fans and eventually the Canadian Idol crown.

Week	Theme	Song Choice	Artist
Audition	N/A	"Smoke Gets in Your Eyes" "Down on the Corner"	The Platters; Creedence Clearwater Revival
Top 32	N/A	"One"	U2
Wildcard	N/A	"Just the Way You Are"	Billy Joel
Top 11	Canadian Hits	"Try"	Blue Rodeo
Top 8	Motown	"For Once in My Life"	Stevie Wonder
Top 6	Summertime Hits	"Drift Away"	Dobie Gray
Top 5	Elton John	"Believe"	Elton John
Top 4	Love Songs	"Crazy" "Hooked on a Feeling"	Patsy Cline; Blue Swede
Top 3	Judges' Choice; Competitors' Choice	"He Ain't Heavy, He's My Brother" "Movin' Out (Anthony's Song)"	The Hollies; Billy Joel
Top 2	Final Two	"Something More"; Stand by Me "Down on the Corner"	Ryan Malcolm; Ben E. King; Creedence Clearwater Revival

=== After Idol ===
His debut single, "Something More" was released on radio the day after his win and to the public on September 30. It went four times platinum on the first day of its release and stayed at #1 on the Canadian Singles Chart for 13 consecutive weeks.

On December 9, 2003, Malcolm's debut album Home was released. It debuted and peaked at #4 on the Canadian Albums Chart, and was certified platinum, selling 170,000 copies and earning a Juno nomination for Best Pop Album.

Later that month, Malcolm participated in World Idol and shared the stage with Elton John and Victoria Beckham. Alongside fellow idol friend Kelly Clarkson, he placed sixth. He followed this with a tour of Eastern Canada with various guests, including Jacynthe, Gary Beals, and Audrey de Montigny. He returned to Europe two more times that year to perform with Annie Lennox at Royal Albert Hall in London as well as to perform in Prague.

He represented Canada at the National Children's Peace Concert in the Czech Republic. He sang the national anthem at the 2004 Grey Cup.

He made his acting debut in the Ross Petty pantomime "Snow White and the Group of Seven" at the Elgin Theatre in Toronto with fellow finalists Gary Beals and Billy Klippert, as well as season two finalist Elena Juatco. Ryan also spent some time traveling in Africa and South America, where many of LLF's songs were inspired. In 2006 and 2007 he was a two-time host of Toronto's sketch comedy show Sunday Night Live.

Malcolm and his girlfriend briefly ran a restaurant in El Castillo, Costa Rica.

== Low Level Flight ==
In 2006, Malcolm formed and fronted a new five-piece alternative rock band Low Level Flight. On March 27, 2007, the band released their debut album Urgency. The band spent much of 2007 touring across Canada and later toured Mexico and the United States, promoting their debut album. In September 2007, LLF performed their second single from the album "Say" on the top three results show of Canadian Idol. In 2009, LLF signed a record deal with Times Of India, and toured throughout India. LLF released their second studio album "Through These Walls" in 2011. And toured UK and Europe twice in support of the release. They are currently on their third single "TSK TSK". The band will return to India in early 2013 for more tour dates.

Along with fronting LLF, Malcolm is a CEO of I Heart Records, a Toronto-based record label.

== Discography ==
- Ryan Malcolm discography

== See also ==
- Canadian rock
- Music of Canada
