= Aaron Walpole =

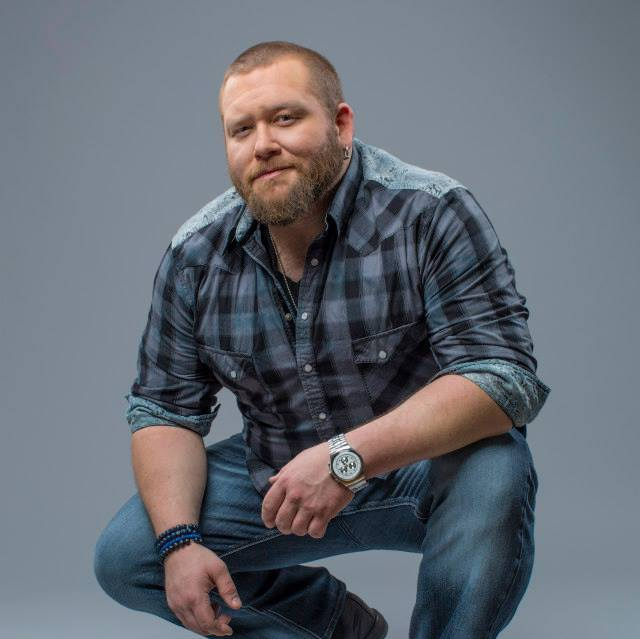

Background information
- Born: Aaron John Walpole; March 7, 1979 (age 47); London, Ontario, Canada
- Genres: Musicals, Rock Opera, Rock, Blues
- Occupations: Actor, Musician
- Instruments: Vocals, Guitar

Aaron John Walpole (born March 7, 1979) is a Canadian actor and singer, who placed third on the third season of Canadian Idol. He is best known for playing the role of Lonnie in the 2010 Toronto run of Rock of Ages and Annas in the 2012 Broadway run of Jesus Christ Superstar. He appeared in the 2014 Broadway revival of Les Misérables, as a part of the ensemble.

== Early life ==
Walpole was born in London, Ontario, and has two siblings. When he was 10 years old, he saw a production of Jesus Christ Superstar with his family, which inspired him to pursue musical theatre.

Walpole attended Parkside Collegiate Institute, where he played football and acted. He appeared in a high school production of West Side Story as Tony. In 2001, Walpole graduated from the musical theatre program at Sheridan College.

== Career ==
=== Canadian Idol ===
In 2005, Walpole auditioned for the third season of Canadian Idol. He went to the auditions to support a friend, but was forced to register to audition so he could stay in line with her. Walpole advanced through the audition stages, but was eliminated in the top 32 round. However, he was chosen to compete in the wildcard round where he received enough votes to advance. Walpole finished in third place, behind runner-up Rex Goudie and winner Melissa O'Neil.

Following the show, Walpole released a self-titled album in 2006.

=== Performances and results ===
Week	Theme	Song	Artist	Status
Top 32	Free Choice	" Try"	Blue Rodeo	Eliminated
Wildcard	Free Choice	"Drift Away"	Dobie Gray	Advanced
Top 10	Canadian Hits	" You Ain't Seen Nothing Yet"	Bachman–Turner Overdrive	Safe
Top 9	Stevie Wonder	"You Haven't Done Nothin'"	Stevie Wonder	Safe
Top 8	The 80s	"Working for the Weekend"	Loverboy	Safe
Top 7	Standards	"I Can't Believe That You're in Love with Me"	Dean Martin	Bottom 2
Top 6	Classic Rock	"Hot Blooded"	Foreigner	Safe
Top 5	Burton Cummings & The Guess Who	"These Eyes"	The Guess Who	Safe
Top 4	Elvis Presley	"(Let Me Be Your) Teddy Bear" " Love Me Tender"	Elvis Presley	Safe
Top 3	The Barenaked Ladies	"Break Your Heart" " Enid"	The Barenaked Ladies	Eliminated

=== Theatre ===
In 2010, Walpole starred as Lonny in the Canadian premiere production of Rock of Ages. The musical opened at the Royal Alexandra Theatre on April 20, 2010 and closed on January 2, 2011.

Walpole made his Broadway debut in 2012, where he appeared as Annas in the revival of Jesus Christ Superstar. The production was originally presented in 2011 at the Stratford Festival, before transferring to the La Jolla Playhouse where it played a pre-Broadway engagement. The show closed on July 1, after four months of performances.

In 2013, Walpole appeared in a revival of Les Misérables, where he played Champmathieu and understudied the role of Jean Valjean. The musical had a pre-Broadway engagement at the Princess of Wales Theatre in Toronto between September 27, 2013 and February 2, 2014. The musical then transferred to Broadway, where it began performances at the Imperial Theatre on 1 March 2014.

In 2015, Walpole joined the first national tour of Kinky Boots, where he played Don.

In 2025, Walpole will appear as a standby in the Canadian revival production of Come from Away. The musical will play at the Babs Asper Theatre in Ottawa between August 14 and September 1, 2024, before transferring to the Royal Alexandra Theatre where it will begin performances on September 22, 2024.

=== Television and film ===
Walpole's first major acting role was in the 2003 television movie, Deacons for Defense. He also starred in the 2011 movie Silent But Deadly as Rob. Since then, he has appeared in several television shows.

== Personal life ==
On October 4, 2014, Walpole married Stefanie Oechslin. They have one child, a son named Eli.

== Credits ==
=== Theatre ===
Year	Production	Role	Location	Category	Ref.
2004	Guys and Dolls	Angie the Ox / Master of Ceremonies	Festival Theatre	Regional / Stratford Festival	
2004	Anything Goes	Quartet Tenor #2	Avon Theatre	Regional / Stratford Festival	
2010–2011	Rock of Ages	Lonny	Royal Alexandra Theater	Canadian production / Mirvish Productions	
2011	Camelot	Sir Lionel	Festival Theatre	Regional / Stratford Festival	
2011	Jesus Christ Superstar	Annas	Avon Theatre	Regional / Stratford Festival	
2011	Jesus Christ Superstar	Annas	La Jolla Playhouse	Pre-Broadway engagement	
2012	Jesus Christ Superstar	Annas	Neil Simon Theatre	Broadway	
2013–2014	Les Misérables	alt. Jean Valjean	Princess of Wales Theatre	Pre-Broadway engagement: Toronto	
2014–2016	Les Misérables	alt. Jean Valjean	Imperial Theatre	Broadway	
2015–2017	Kinky Boots	Don	First National Tour		
2017	Rock of Ages	Lonny	Dunfield Theatre	Regional / Drayton Entertainment	
2018	The Little Mermaid	Chef Louis	Huron Country Playhouse; St. Jacobs Country Playhouse	Regional / Drayton Entertainment	
2018	Man of La Mancha	Sancho Panza / Cervantes' Manservant	Dunfield Theatre	Regional / Drayton Entertainment	
2021	Jesus Christ Superstar	Annas	Tokyu Theatre Orb	Concert staging: Tokyo, Japan	
2022	It Runs in the Family	Police Sergeant	Hamilton Family Theatre; Huron Country Playhouse	Regional / Drayton Entertainment	
2023	Evita	Ensemble	Hamilton Family Theatre	Regional / Drayton Entertainment	
2023	Fiddler on the Roof	Mendel/Russian Soloist	Hamilton Family Theatre	Regional / Drayton Entertainment	
2024	Come from Away	Standby	Babs Asper Theatre	Pre-Toronto engagement: Ottawa	
2024–2025	Come from Away	Standby	Royal Alexandra Theatre	Canadian production / Mirvish Productions	

=== Television ===
Year	Show	Role	Notes
2003	Deacons for Defense	Jimmy	TV movie
2005	Canadian Idol	Himself	3rd-place finalist
2011	Breakout Kings	Skip Blax	Episode S1.E10: "Paid in Full"
2021	In the Dark	Security Guard	Episode S3.E4: "Safe and Sound"
2021	The Hot Zone	Security Guard	Episode S2.E2: "Hell's Chimney"
2023	Accused	Bailiff #2	Episode S1.E13: "Samir's Story"

=== Film ===
Year	Title	Role	Notes
2014	Silent but Deadly	Rob	

=== Discography ===
- Canadian Idol: High Notes – Sony BMG, 19 Recordings (2005)
- Aaron Walpole (2006)
