= Chad Doucette =

- Born: August 3, 1988 (age 36)
- Origin: Canadian
- Occupation: Singer

Chad Doucette (born August 3, 1988) is a Canadian singer from East Chezzetcook, Nova Scotia, who finished 4th in the 2006 season of Canadian Idol.

Doucette, who auditioned in Sydney, Nova Scotia, made the Top 48 in season 3 of Canadian Idol, but was cut in the last round before the semi-finals. In season 4, he reached 4th place. The week he was eliminated from the competition, a record was set for the most votes cast on Canadian Idol, 4.3 million.

Songs that Doucette has performed on Canadian Idol include:

Week/Theme	Song Sung	Artist	Results
Top 22; Contestant's Choice	"Tonight I Wanna Cry"	Keith Urban	Advanced
Top 18; Contestant's Choice	"Save the Last Dance for Me"	The Drifters	Advanced
Top 14; Contestant's Choice	"Iris"	Goo Goo Dolls	Advanced
Top 10; Canadian Hits	"The Other Man"	Sloan	Safe
Top 9 The Rolling Stones	"You Can't Always Get What You Want"	The Rolling Stones	Safe
Top 8 Music From the 1980s	"Never Tear Us Apart"	INXS	Bottom 2
Top 7 Classic Rock Songs	"Bad Side of the Moon"	April Wine	Safe
Top 6 Songs - Unplugged	"Santa Monica"	Theory of a Deadman	Safe
Top 5 Hits of Country	"If You Could Read My Mind"	Gordon Lightfoot	Safe
Top 4 Judges' Choice	"Hanging By A Moment" "Everybody Hurts"	Lifehouse; R.E.M.	Eliminated
