= Tyler Hamilton (singer) =

- Born: Tyler Hamilton
- Genres: Pop, classical
- Occupation: Singer
- Instrument: Vocals
- Years active: 2003–present
- Label: independent
- Website: Due Voci's website

Tyler Hamilton is a pop singer best known for placing seventh in the first season of Canadian Idol. He is also a member of the classical music group "Due Voci." The group released their first studio album in June 2010.

== Career ==
Tyler competed in the first season of Canadian Idol which took place in 2003. He finished in seventh place. After Idol, Tyler met David Foster, who introduced him to American Idol fifth season runner up Katharine McPhee and songwriter Diane Warren, who would eventually start Tyler's classical music group "Due Voci." He partnered up with singer-songwriter Kelly Levesque and made their first album, Due Voci, which released in the summer of 2010. Tyler is currently the first Canadian Idol contestant to have an album chart in one of the major US Billboard charts.

== Discography ==
=== Albums ===
| Year | Album | Peak | |
| Year | Album | US Class | US Heat |
|---|---|---|---|
| 2010 | Due Voci: Released: 8 June 2010; Label: Self released; Format: CD, digital download | 4 | 11 |
