= Amber Fleury =

- Born: April 10, 1979 (age 47); Dauphin, Manitoba, Canada
- Occupation: Recording artist
- Website: www.amberfleury.com

Amber Fleury (born April 10, 1979) is a Canadian recording artist, and was the eighth-place finisher in the third season of Canadian Idol, which aired during the summer of 2005. Born in Dauphin, Manitoba, she now lives in Calgary, Alberta where she is a paralegal.

== Early life and career ==
Fleury was born in Dauphin, Manitoba. Her parents found that she was able to sing on key from as young as age two. At age ten, Fleury appeared on the nationally televised "Tommy Hunter Show" in Toronto, Ontario. At age twelve, she released a five-song mini album "Say It Again" produced by Gary Buck. At age thirteen, she won a vocal competition in Edmonton; soon after, she recorded and released the album Lila's Child and toured Western Canada. The first single off the "Lila's Child" album, "Just Getting Used to Your Love", peaked at #18 on the Top 60 Canadian Country Music Charts. The music video for her second single "Lila's Child" was played in medium rotation on CMT. She then went on to release a full second album "Ain't No Cure For Love". Throughout her early career, Fleury performed on several television shows, telethons, and festivals across Western Canada.

Before Canadian Idol, she worked as a paralegal at Bennett Jones LLP in Calgary.

== Canadian Idol ==
In the Top 100, for her first solo performance, Amber sang "I Can't Make You Love Me", which helped her advance to the group stage of the competition. She joined forces with two other contestants and they performed their rendition of Brandy's "Have You Ever". All three girls advanced to the duets stage. Amber then performed Shania Twain's "From This Moment On" with a fellow contestant and advanced to the last stage of the Top 100, which was once again, solo performances. She sang Faith Hill's "There You'll Be" and was then chosen to advance to the Top 32.

In the Top 32, Fleury performed Bonnie Raitt's "I Can't Make You Love Me" and was pegged by the judges as being the best singer that had ever been on the show. Their high praise along with Canada's approval bought her the votes to put her through to the Top 10. Throughout her stay on Canadian Idol, Fleury appeared to be most at home singing ballads and country songs although she showed much versatility with her song choices throughout the first three weeks of the Top 10. In "Stevie Wonder" week, the judges urged her to step out of her comfort zone. However, after her performance of Cher's "Just Like Jesse James" in the Eighties week, Fleury received the lowest number of votes and was eliminated from the competition.

Songs that Fleury performed on Canadian Idol include:

- Top 32: "I Can't Make You Love Me"
- Top 10: "Possession" (Canadian Hits week)
- Top 9: "Lately" (Stevie Wonder week)
- Top 8: "Just Like Jesse James" (Eighties week)

=== Post Idol ===
Fleury formed a group named Braided with fellow former season 3 contestants Ashley Leitao and Casey LeBlanc. Their first album was released in August 2006, and they toured the country to promote the album. In 2007 after their move to Toronto to advance their careers, Fleury, Leitao and LeBlanc decided to go their separate ways.

Since that time, Fleury has continued to pursue her music career in Calgary, Alberta where she now fronts her own band called simply "The Amber Fleury Band". The group plays a number of venues in Calgary on a regular basis and their popularity continues to grow. She has also co-written four songs, which she hopes to put on an album in the future.

== Discography ==
=== Albums ===
Year	Album
1991	Say It Again
1993	Lila's Child
1996	Ain't No Cure For Love
2006	Casey, Ashley and Amber

=== Singles ===
Year	Single	CAN Country	Album
1993	"Just Getting Used to Your Love"	63	Lila's Child
1994	"Lila's Child"	57	Lila's Child
1994	"Just a Matter of Time"	60	Lila's Child
