= Toya Alexis =

Canadian vocalist and actress

- Born: LaToya Lesmond; July 16, 1980 (age 46)
- Origin: Ajax, Ontario, Canada
- Genres: Soul; jazz; pop
- Occupations: Singer–songwriter, actress
- Instrument: Vocals
- Years active: 2001-2006

LaToya Lesmond (born July 16, 1980), better known as Toya Alexis, is a Canadian vocalist and actress from Ajax, Ontario.

== Career ==
Alexis won a "Rising Star" contest and sang at the Apollo Theater. In 2001 she appeared, as LaToya Lesmond, as a contestant on season one of Popstars on the Global Television Network. She was a finalist, and was featured on the debut album of the winners who were named Sugar Jones. She was a contestant on the first season of Canadian Idol in 2003, reaching sixth place in a controversial decision as she was a judge favourite. "I actually knew I loved to sing before I could talk," Toya Alexis told students at Ridgewood Public School (Mississauga, ON) after her Canadian Idol experience.

In 2004, Alexis was one of several Hip-Hop artists to co-write "Drop the Chrome," an anti-violence song aimed at youth. Other co-writers were Marcus Kane, Thrust, Maestro, Michie Mee, and Skitz. Proceeds from the sale of the 3-track CD were split between two youth-focused charities Tropicana Community Services and Youth Assisting Youth.

=== Debut album ===
Alexis was subsequently offered a recording contract, and released her first single, the Top 40 hit "Am I Loving?", in 2004. She also appeared as a guest vocalist on recordings by several other Canadian artists. Her full-length debut album, S.O.B. Story, was released in August on Canadian Idol judge Farley Flex's label, Plasma, who also served as her manager.

== Theatre ==
In 2005, she was a featured cast member as "Mabel" in the Canstage show Crowns, at the Bluma Appel Theatre in Toronto.

Her other stage credits have included Doo Wop to Motown (Theatre on the Grand), Once on This Island (Stirling Festival Theatre), Rainbow World (Bathurst Street Theatre), The Good Times Are Killing Me (Royal Alex Theatre) and Dreamgirls, (a co-production between Theatre Aquarius and the Manitoba Theatre Centre).

== Idol performances ==
- Top 32 (Group 3) - "I Believe In You and Me" (Whitney Houston)
- Wildcard - "Try It on My Own" (Whitney Houston)
- Top 11 - "If You Asked Me To" (Celine Dion)
- Top 8 - "If You Really Love Me" (Stevie Wonder)
- Top 6 - "You Are the Sunshine of My Life" (Stevie Wonder)

== Singles history ==
2002: "I Got U" (with Sugar Jones) (#70, Canadian Singles Chart)

2004: "Am I Loving?" (#36, Canadian Singles Chart)

2005: "Toy Boy" (#17, Canadian Singles Chart)

2006: "Where Did Our Love Go?" (#29, Canadian Singles Chart)

== Discography ==
=== Albums ===
Year	Album details	Peak	Certifications (sales threshold)
Year	Album details	CA	Certifications (sales threshold)
2005	S.O.B. Story: Released: August 2, 2005; Label: Plasma; Format: CD	—	CA sales: 159,000; CRIA: Platinum
"—" denotes releases that did not chart

=== Singles ===
- "Am I Loving?"
- "Toy Boy"
- "Where Did Our Love Go?"

== Videos ==
Featured on

- Canadian Idol Greatest Moments (2003) (track 11 singing "Try It on My Own")
- Sugar Jones (2001) (featured on "I Got U")
