= Gary Beals =

Canadian singer

- Born: Gary Beals; October 25, 1982 (age 43); Halifax, Nova Scotia
- Origin: Cherry Brook, Nova Scotia
- Genres: Gospel, RnB
- Occupation: Singer-songwriter
- Instrument: Vocals
- Years active: 2002–present

Gary Beals (born October 25, 1982) is a Canadian singer who is best known for being runner up in the first season of the reality television series Canadian Idol. He is a resident of Cherry Brook, Nova Scotia and named "Best Halifamous Person of 2003" by The Coast. Halifax Regional Municipality celebrated "Gary Beals Day" on November 22, 2003.

He is gay.

== Career ==
After coming second place to Ryan Malcolm on Canadian Idol, he released a self-titled debut CD in August 2004.

His first album, Gary Beals, entered the Canadian album charts at Number 10 and went on to sell 110,000 copies.

His second album, The Rebirth Of..., was released on June 9, 2009.

His third studio album, Bleed My Truth was released October 23, 2020. His first single from the album, "Me For Me", 'is about being vulnerable and not being afraid to expose pieces of ourselves. It's about having open and honest conversations with those we love.'

== Discography ==
=== Albums ===
Year	Album	Peak	Sales
Year	Album	CAN	Sales
2004	Gary Beals: Debut album; Released: August 17, 2004	10	Sales: 110,000
2009	The Rebirth Of...: Second studio album; Released: June 9, 2009	—	Sales: n/a
2020	Bleed My Truth: Third studio album; Released: October 23, 2020	—	Sales: n/a
2023	The Melody Within: Fourth studio album; Released: October 27, 2023	—	Sales: n/a
"—" denotes the album did not chart.

=== Singles ===
Year	Single	Chart peaks	Album
Year	Single	CAN	Album
2004	"Summer Nights"	4	Gary Beals
2004	"I've Changed"	—	Gary Beals
2004	"Not That Strong"	—	Gary Beals
2009	"I Know You're Out There"	—	The Rebirth Of...
2009	"Jump Off" (featuring Blessed)	—	The Rebirth Of...
2020	"Me for Me"	—	Bleed My Truth
2020	"Blood Red Roses"	—	Bleed My Truth

"—" denotes releases that did not chart. |}
