= Billy Klippert =

Canadian rock singer-songwriter

- Origin: Canada
- Genre: Rock
- Occupation: Singer-songwriter
- Instruments: Vocals, piano
- Years active: 2004–present

Billy Klippert is a Canadian rock singer-songwriter who rose to fame via the first season of Canadian Idol, in which he finished third.

== Career ==
His self-titled debut album on the Orange Record Label reached 36th spot on Canada's top 100 albums chart in July 2004. His second album Naked & The Simple Truth was released on 3 October 2006, the first single from which was 'Going Under'. In March 2007, Klippert won a Canadian Music Week Indie Award for Favourite Pop Artist of the Year.

== Discography ==
=== Albums ===
Year	Album	Peak
Year	Album	CAN
2004	Billy Klippert: Debut album; Released: 15 June 2004	36
2006	Naked & The Simple Truth: Second studio album; Released: 3 October 2006	—
"—" denotes the album did not chart.

=== Singles ===
Year	Single	Chart peaks	Album
Year	Single	CAN	Album
2004	"Levon"	—	Billy Klippert
2006	"Going Under"	—	Naked & The Simple Truth

"—" denotes releases that did not chart.
