= Farley Flex =

Canadian music manager

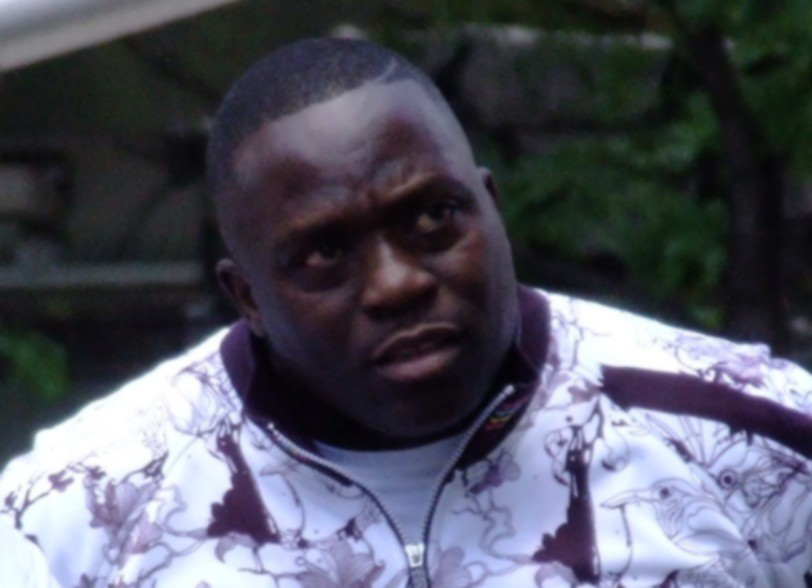
- Born: Farley Fridal; August 9, 1962 (age 63); London, England
- Occupations: Music promoter, artist manager
- Notable credit: Canadian Idol

Farley Flex (born Farley Fridal, August 9, 1962) is a Media Consultant, music promoter, artist manager, and motivational speaker. He is best known for being a judge on the reality television series Canadian Idol.

== Early life ==
He was born in London, England, to Trinidadian parents.

== Career ==
Flex was instrumental in founding FLOW 93.5 in Toronto, the first urban music-format radio station in Canada when it first went on the air in 2001, and where he was the station's first Music Director and Vice President of Business Development. His success as an artist manager, radio personality and executive along with the success of the station prompted Canadian Idol's producers to select him as a judge before its 2003 launch. He is the recipient of the Bob Marley Day Award (2009), a Harry Jerome Award (2007), the Urban Music Association of Canada's Special Achievement and Media Personality of the Year Awards, and was inducted into the Scarborough Walk of Fame. Flex is the founder of R.E.A.L. School - Reality Education & Applied Life Skills a not for profit organization that engages primarily youth from inner city and marginalized communities worldwide. "What celebrity does is that it creates an umbrella under which you can do all those things with a higher level of impact."

Flex was the original manager of Maestro Fresh Wes, Canada's first mainstream rapper, and has also taken several former Idol contestants under his wing to promote their albums, such as Gary Beals and Toya Alexis.

In 1994 he was featured in Andrew Munger's documentary film Make Some Noise.

Flex currently operates FUSE Restaurant Entertainment Emporium, a restaurant in the historic district of Corktown in specializing in global cuisine and live entertainment.
