= Jake Gold =

American-born Canadian music manager (born 1958)

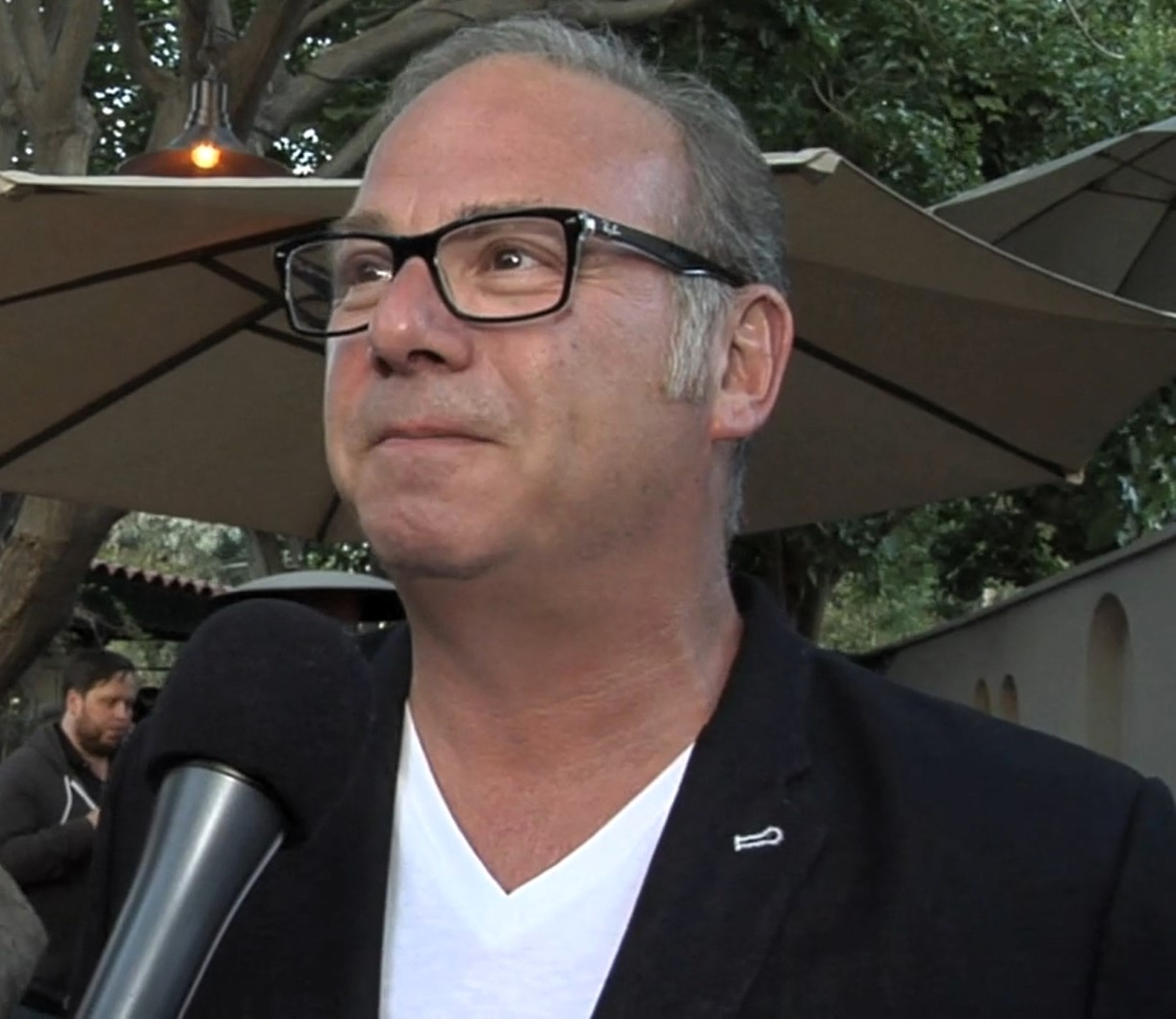
- Gold in 2015
- Born: April 4, 1958 (age 68); New Jersey, U.S.
- Occupation: Musician manager
- Notable credit: Canadian Idol
- Website: www.mgmtrust.ca

Jake Gold (born April 4, 1958) is an American-born Canadian music manager. He was a judge on the Canadian Idol television program. In addition to Idol participants, he has managed Canadian artists The Tragically Hip, The Watchmen, The Cliks, and Sass Jordan.

== Early life ==
Gold was born in New Jersey. His family moved to Toronto when he was a small child.

== Career ==
Gold started his management company, The Management Trust, in the 1980s. He managed the Tragically hip for seventeen years, ending in 2003, and was also manager for the band Big Wreck.

In 2002, Gold was chosen as a judge for the television talent contest show Canadian Idol, and he held this role for six seasons.

The Management Trust (MGM Trust) later represented artists Adam Cohen and Crash Karma, as well as music producers me&john, Moe Berg, Russell Broom, Terry Brown, and Laurence Currie. He has been awarded Manager of the Year three times by the Canadian Music Industry.
