= Zack Werner =

Canadian musician (born 1960)

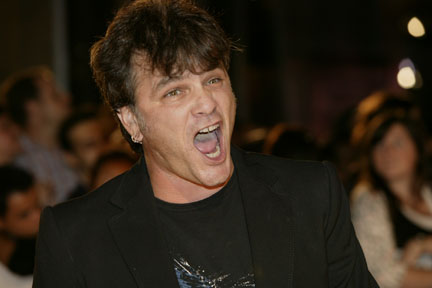
- Zack Werner in 2007.
- Born: Isaac Werner; 1960 (age 65–66); Winnipeg, Manitoba, Canada
- Occupations: Record producer, talent manager, entertainment lawyer, musician
- Notable credit: Canadian Idol

Isaac "Zack" Werner (born 1960) is a Canadian artist, producer, entertainment lawyer and manager.

== Early life and education ==
Born in Winnipeg in 1960, Werner attended the St. John's-Ravenscourt School. He received a B.A. from the University of Minnesota and a law degree from the University of British Columbia.

== Musical career ==
Werner moved to Toronto and joined local rock band The Ringing. The band, managed by Gary Pring (Glass Tiger), secured a development deal with Capitol Records. Werner formed the group Thick As Thieves and relocated to Los Angeles. The group opened for Alice In Chains and Pearl Jam and negotiated a distribution deal through BMG. When the band broke up, Werner returned to Toronto and signed a development deal with MCA as a solo-artist and worked with producer John Punter (Spoons, Japan).

Werner is a founding member of Canadian country rock band Haymaker, founded in 2007.

== Management career ==
Werner practiced Entertainment law with the firm Sanderson, Taylor (now Sanderson Entertainment Law), where his clients were The Philosopher Kings, Chris Smith Management, Sky, Ron Sexsmith and Sass Jordan. During his legal career Zack presented showcases for record companies that were among the first exposure for k-os, Rascalz, Sarah Harmer and Finger Eleven (then known as Rainbow Butt Monkeys).

In 1997, Werner founded Venus Corporation with Beau Randall. The company offered artist and producer management and a record label, Venus Records, in partnership with EMI Canada. Werner managed the artists Esthero, Down With Webster, Skye Sweetnam, Tara Slone, Patricia O'Callaghan, Simon Wilcox, Robin Black, Lindi Ortega, Joel Parisien (Newworldson), Doc McKinney, The Johnstones and James Robertson. The firm also managed both winners of the TV series Rock Star, Lukas Rossi and J.D. Fortune.

== Canadian Idol-present ==
From 2003-2008, Werner was one of the judges on Canadian Idol (in which capacity he appeared on a 2004 episode of Corner Gas). He was also a judge on the 2003 one-off performance show, World Idol.

In 2011, Werner formed Zack Werner Idol School providing vocal performance training and mentoring across Greater Toronto and producing live concerts. The students included Interscope Records recording artist Ren, Eurovision Song Contest semi-finalist Peter Serrado and up-and-coming singer/songwriter Mikalyn Hay. In 2013, he played a small role in the film Catch a Christmas Star.

In 2016, Werner moved his Idol School to St. John's, Newfoundland and Labrador. In partnership with The Telegram and NTV (CJON-DT), he produced a province-wide singing contest for three years, Sing NL. He also created a pop youth performance group KidZrock NL and produced and managed records by artists Madeline Salter and Abigale. Werner also returned to playing live with a long-term residency at Erin's Pub, and as a member of retro jam bands Groovy and, with Wade Pinhorn, Brad Jefford and Boomer Stamp, The Atomic Dogs.

In 2021, Werner returned to Toronto to work in business development/affairs in the digital rights and music publishing industry.
