= Tim Fletcher =

English-Canadian musician (born 1978)

- Born: Timothy Fletcher; 1978 (age 47–48); Montreal, Quebec, Canada
- Genres: Indie rock
- Instruments: Vocals, electric guitar, acoustic guitar
- Years active: 2000 – present

Timothy Fletcher (born 1978) is an English-Canadian musician who was the vocalist and guitarist for Montreal-based band the Stills, which disbanded in 2011. Born in Montreal, Fletcher met his future bandmates at the age of 15 before forming the Stills in 2000. Along with a number of the Stills, he previously played in an early incarnation of the band Chinatown, and was also a member of heavy metal band Amentum.

Fletcher and Dave Hamelin were the principal songwriters in the Stills. On the band's first album, Logic Will Break Your Heart, Fletcher was the lead singer. However, when guitarist Greg Paquet left the band and former drummer Hamelin took up lead guitar, Fletcher's role as frontman was diminished on the second record, Without Feathers. He returned to lead vocalist duties for the third album, Oceans Will Rise.

Since the demise of the Stills, Fletcher sang background vocals on the Sam Roberts Band's 2014 album Lo-Fantasy and played guitar for Canadian rapper k-os. In 2014, he formed the band Beat Cops with Mikey Heppner (of Priestess fame), releasing the album Mean Streets in 2015. That same year, Fletcher released the album Punks on the Moon with his project Voizes.

Inspired by 1970s-era UK punk and reggae, Fletcher formed Megative with ex-Stills producer Gus van Go, songwriting duo Like Minds (Jesse Singer and Chris Soper) and dancehall performer Screechy Dan. In 2017, the ensemble debuted with the single "More Time". On July 27, 2018, Megative released their self-titled debut album on Last Gang Records.

In 2015, he made a cameo appearance in the comedy web series The Plateaus.
