= Rememberese =

EP by The Stills
- Released: June 17, 2003
- Recorded: The Boiler-Room (Brooklyn, NY), 2003
- Genre: Indie rock, post-punk revival
- Length: 14:15
- Label: Vice; 679 Recordings (UK)
- Producer: Gus Van Go

The Stills chronology
| Rememberese (2003) | Logic Will Break Your Heart (2003) |

Professional ratings
Review scores
| Source | Rating |
|---|---|
| AllMusic | 4/5 stars |

Rememberese is the debut EP by Canadian indie rock band the Stills, released on June 17, 2003 by Vice Records (and in the UK by 679 Recordings). Produced by Gus Van Go, it contained "Still in Love Song" and that song's extended remix, as well as two additional songs ("Killer Bees" and "Talk to Me") not found on their following debut full-length, Logic Will Break Your Heart.

== Track listing ==
Al tracks composed by the Stills

1. "Still in Love Song" – 3:44
2. "Killer Bees" – 4:07
3. "Talk to Me" – 1:30
4. "Still in Love Song" (12" Extended Remix) – 4:56

== Personnel ==
- "Still in Love Song" recorded by Jason Braun at Melody Lane, NYC. Mixed by Gus Van Go and Werner F. at The Boiler-Room, NYC.
- "Killer Bees" recorded by Werner F. at The Boiler-Room, NYC. Mixed by Gus Van Go and Werner F.
- "Talk to Me" recorded on 4-track in Dave Hamelin's bedroom.
- "Still in Love Song (12" Extended Remix)" by Gus Van Go and Werner F.
- Artwork by Martine Sicotte for MSDSGN.
- Photos by Dave Reich.
- Mastered by Werner F. at The Boiler-Room, NYC.
