= Walk the Plank (theatre company) =

British performance company

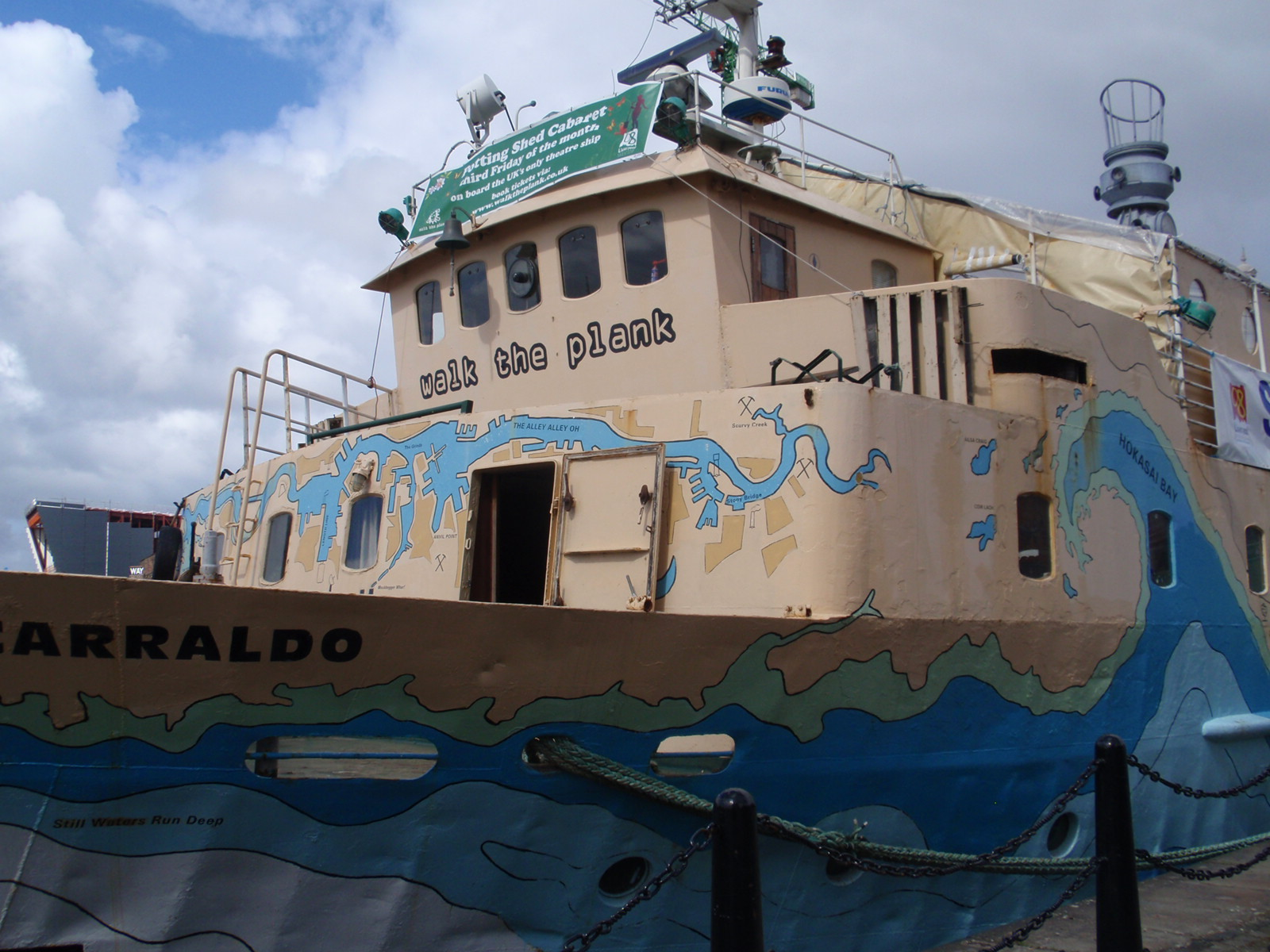
Part of the side of the Fitzcarraldo

Walk the Plank are a British group of artists, theatre makers, pyrotechnicians and event engineers who specialise in outdoor arts/theatre, touring performance and pyrotechnics.

Their shows are on land and on water and often mix performance, music, lighting, visual images, fire, and fireworks. The company was established by John Wassell and Liz Pugh in 1991, who identified a niche market for a touring theatre ship, and other aquatic shows on the waterways. The company's work began when the pair purchased a touring theatre ship, the MV Fitzcarraldo. The company's work has now extended far beyond the ship and they work on delivering shows and events, varying in scale from intimate to epic. Walk the Plank have produced work for Toronto’s WinterCity Festival, Singapore Festival, Euro 2004, Tall Ships 2005, Centerparcs, Sir Paul McCartney, the Commonwealth Games, as well as multiple city and local councils. Perhaps their most well known credit are the opening and closing ceremonies for Liverpool's Capital of Culture celebrations.

Their administrative base is in Salford, Greater Manchester and they have workshop facilities in Ramsbottom and Rawtenstall.

Their work often involves community engagement and they are known for scheduling and leading participation elements which fit the context of the event they are organising.

== Event management and consultancy ==
The company's Senior Management Team (including co-founders John Wassell and Liz Pugh and Project Directors Andy Stratford and Billie Klinger) are trusted advisers in the areas of outdoor arts and cultural events.

== MV Fitzcarraldo ==
The Fitzcarraldo was built in 1971 in Sandnessjøen, Norway for TFDS as the MV Bjarkøj.

In 2000, 's co-production (with Company) of Moby Dick won Best Fringe Production at the Manchester Evening News Theatre Awards. Jim Burke also won the Best New Play award for this adaptation.

In 2003 the ship went on a national tour to 19 ports with a stage adaption of Jules Verne's 1870 novel Twenty Thousand Leagues Under the Seas, to positive reviews. At first the audience sits on the quayside, and the Fitzcarraldo represents the Abraham Lincoln; later they sit in the Fitzcarraldo's hold, which represents the inside of the Nautilus, or occasionally the seabed.

Due to prohibitive expenses the MV Fitzcarraldo was sold in 2010 to Dutch owners who plan to turn it into a floating nightspot. Walk the Plank continue to focus on delivering large scale outdoor events, creating touring performances and providing pyrotechnics and firework displays to both public sector and private corporate organisations.
