= Gus van Go =

Canadian-American musician and producer

- Born: Gustavo Coriandoli; Mar del Plata, Argentina
- Genres: Indie rock
- Occupations: Record producer; mixer
- Formerly of: Megative

Gus van Go is a Canadian-American producer, mixer, and musician best known for his work with The Beaches, Metric, Arkells, The Stills, The Sam Roberts Band, Lowell, Whitehorse, and Hollerado. Some of his other work includes Wintersleep, Michael Rault, Terra Lightfoot, Said The Whale, The Trews, and Priestess. He is also a member of the band Megative, along with Tim Fletcher (ex-lead-singer of The Stills) and Jamaican reggae vocalist Screechy Dan.

== Early life ==
van Go (born Gustavo Coriandoli), was born in Mar Del Plata, Argentina. His family subsequently moved to Montreal and he is now a naturalized American and Canadian citizen.

== Career ==
van Go began his musical career as lead-singer/guitarist for the Montreal cult-band Me Mom & Morgentaler. The band established a following in the 1990s, and was known for its extravagant and theatrical live shows. In 1999, over 10,000 attended the band's reunion concert in Quebec City.

In 2001, he moved to New York City, where he met musician and producer Werner F. The two began working together in 2003 when they produced The Stills’ debut album Logic Will Break Your Heart, which received favorable reviews from critics. In 2006 they built The Boiler Room Studio in the Williamsburg neighborhood of Brooklyn, NY, where they've since produced and mixed many albums including Fast Romantics, Monster Truck, Matt Mays, Glorious Sons, The Elwins, Michael Rault, as well as many popular French language artists from Quebec like Les Trois Accords and Cowboys Fringants.

Van Go currently divides his time between his Brooklyn and Montreal studios.

== Awards and discography ==
Van Go was personally nominated for a Juno award in 2018 for his work with the group Whitehorse and Singer-songwriter Terra Lightfoot. Both artists’ albums were also nominated for Best Album in the Adult Alternative category that year, each produced and mixed by Gus van Go and his partner Werner F.

He was nominated for an Engineer Of The Year Juno award in 2015 for the Whitehorse album Leave No Bridge Unburned, which took home the Juno award for Alternative Album of the Year.

In 2015, he produced and mixed the album Octobre by French-language neo-trad band Les Cowboys Fringants which reached #1 in the Quebec charts, attained gold-record status, and was awarded Rock Album of the Year at the 2016 ADISQ awards ceremonies.

In 2013 and 2010, he was nominated for Producer of The Year at Quebec's ADISQ awards for his work with Les Trois Accords.

Oceans Will Rise, the third release from The Stills, was awarded a Juno Award for 'Alternative Album of the Year' during the 2009 Juno Awards Gala on March 28, 2009. In 2008, Vulgaires Machins’ Compter Les Corps (another Gus van Go & Werner F production) was nominated for a Juno Award for "Best French-Language Album".

=== Selected discography ===
(P = Produced, M = Mixed)

Release year	Artist	Album/Single
1995	The Kingpins	On the Run (P)
1997	The Kingpins	Watch Your Back (P)
1998	The Undercovers	Some People - Stomp Records (P)
2001	Smitty's	Burnin’ & Shakin’ (P)
2003	The Stills	Logic Will Break Your Heart - Vice Records/Atlantic (P/M)
2005	Priestess	Hello Master - RCA/Indica (P/M)
2006	The Stills	Without Feathers - Vice Records/Atlantic (P/M)
2006	Vulgaires Machins	Compter Les Corps - Indica Records (P/M)
2006	Xavier Caféïne	Gisèle - Indica Records (M)
2007	The Shapes	Faces We Make When We Dance (P/M)
2008	The Trews	No Time for Later - Bumstead/Universal (P/M)
2008	The Stills	Oceans Will Rise - Arts & Crafts (P/M)
2009	The Junction	Another Link in the Chain (P/M)
2009	Chinatown	Cité d’or - Tacca (P/M)
2009	Les Trois Accords	Dans Mon Corps - Indica Records (P/M)
2009	Low Level Flight	Through These Walls (P/M)
2010	Vulgaires Machins	Requiéme Pour Les Sourds - Indica Records (P/M)
2010	Hollerado	Record In A Bag - Royal Mountain Records (P/M)
2010	Ariel	Après Le Crime - Tacca (P/M)
2011	Neverending White Lights	Act III: Love Will Ruin (M)
2011	Monster Truck	The Brown EP - Dine Alone Records (P/M)
2011	The Grates	Secret Rituals - Dew Process/Vagrant (P)
2011	Kamakazi	Rien à Cacher - Indica Records (P/M)
2012	Amos the Transparent	Good Night My Dear… I'm Falling Apart (M)
2012	The Junction	Grievances (P/M)
2012	GrimSkunk	Set Fire - Indica Records (P/M)
2012	Rah Rah	The Poet's Dead - Hidden Pony (P/M)
2012	Les Trois Accords	J'aime Ta Grand-mère - La Tribu (P/M)
2013	Hollerado	White Paint - Royal Mountain Records (P/M)
2013	Xavier Caféïne	New Love - Indica Records (P/M)
2013	Wildlife	On The Heart - Wax Records (P)
2013	Said the Whale	Hawaiii - Hidden Pony (M)
2014	Terra Lightfoot	Everytime My Mind runs Wild - Sonic Unyon Records (P/M)
2014	Jeremy Fisher	The Lemon Squeeze - Hidden Pony (P/M)
2014	Teenage Kicks	Spoils of Youth - Rezolute/Universal (M)
2014	In-Flight Safety	Conversationalist - Night Danger (M)
2014	Royal Tusk	Mountain EP - Hidden Pony (P/M)
2014	Guillaume Beauregard	D’Étoiles, de pluie et de cendres - La Tribu (P/M)
2015	The Lazys	The Lazys - Pheremone Records (P/M)
2015	Michael Rault	Living Daylight - Burger Records (M)
2015	Simon I	Simon I - La Tribu (P/M)
2015	The Glorious Sons	The Union - Black Box/Universal (M)
2015	The Elwins	Play For Keeps - Hidden Pony (M)
2015	Hollerado	"Firefly" (single) - Royal Mountain Records (P/M)
2015	Sun K	Northern Lies - Maple Music Recordings (M)
2015	Whitehorse	Leave No Bridge Unburned - Six Shooter Records (P/M)
2015	Rah Rah	Vessels - Hidden Pony (P/M)
2015	Terra Lightfoot	Every Time My Mind Runs Wild (Sonic Unyon)
2015	Les Cowboys Fringants	Octobre - La Tribu (P/M)
2015	Les Trois Accords	Joie d’etre gai - La Tribu (P/M)
2015	Fast Romantics	"Julia" (single) (P/M)
2016	Les Handclaps	"Sessions: Brooklyn" (P/M) (Handclaps Records)
2016	The Junction	"City Light" Single (M) (Culvert Music)
2016	Wintersleep	The Great Detachment - Dine Alone (M)
2016	Tuns	Mind Over Matter - Royal Mountain (M)
2016	Arkells	Morning Report (P) (Universal Music Canada / Last Gang Records)
2016	Sam Roberts	"If You Want It" (single) - Universal Music (M)
2017	Fast Romantics	American Love - Light Organ (P/M)
2017	Hollerado	Born Yesterday - Royal Mountain Records (P/M)
2017	Said the Whale	As Long As Your Eyes Are Wide - Hidden Pony (M)
2017	Whitehorse	Panther in the Dollhouse - Six Shooter Records (M)
2017	Matt Mays	Once Upon a Hell of a Time - Sonic Records (M)
2017	Terra Lightfoot	New Mistakes - Sonic Unyon Records (P/M)
2018	Carmanah	Speak In Rhythms (P/M)
2018	Remi Chasse	Les Cris et Les Fleurs - Musicor (P/M)
2018	Jill Barber	Metaphora - Outside (P/M)
2018	Lowell	Lone Wolf - Arts & Crafts (P/M)
2018	Dumas	Nos Idéaux - La Tribu (P/M)
2018	Les Trois Accords	Tous Le Monde Capote - La Tribu (P/M)
2018	Mordicus	Où Sont Les Néons? (M)
2018	Megative	Megative - Last Gang/E-One (P/M)
2018	Modern Space	Flip For It - Warner Canada (P/M)
2019	Les Cowboys Fringants	Les Antipodes - La Tribu (P/M)
2019	Lily Frost	Retro Moderne (P/M)
2019	Guillaume Beauregard	Disparition - La Tribu (P/M)
2019	Robert Charlebois	Et Voila - La Tribu (P/M)
2019	Hollerado	“One Last Dance” (single) - Royal Mountain (P/M)
2019	Maïa	Plus Que Vive - Warner Canada (M)
2019	Marie-Eve Roy	Multicolore - La Tribu (P/M)
2019	Rheostatics	Here Comes The Wolves - Six Shooter (P/M)
2019	Adam Baldwin	No Rest For The Wicket - Sonic (P/M)
2019	Anyway Gang	Anyway Gang - Royal Mountain (P/M)
2020	Jill Barber	Entre Nous - Outside (P/M)
2020	Me Mom and Morgentaler	“Racist Friend” (single) (P/M)
2020	Sam Roberts Band	All Of Us - Universal (P/M)
2020	Lowell	“Lemonade” (single) - Arts & Crafts (P/M)
2020	Whitehorse	Modern Love - Six Shooter (M)
2020	Lowell	“God Is A Fascist"” (single) - Arts & Crafts (P/M)
2021	Alex Porat	"Miss Sick World" (Single) - (M)
2021	Robert Charlebois	Charlebois à Ducharme - La Tribu (P/M)
2021	Lowell	“Caroline” (single) - Arts & Crafts (P/M)
2021	Whitehorse	Strike Me Down - Six Shooter (M)
2021	Les Cowboys Fringants	Les Nuits De Repentigny - La Tribu (P/M)
2022	Metric	Formentera - (P/M)
2023	Metric	Formentera II - (P)
2023	The Beaches	Blame My Ex - (P/M)
2023	Sam Roberts Band	The Adventures of Ben Blank - Universal (P/M)
2024	Dear Rouge	Lonesome High - (P/M)
2024	Les Cowboys Fringants	Pub Royal - La Tribu (P/M)
