= Kandle (musician) =

Canadian singer-songwriter (born 1990)

- Born: Kandle Maria Osborne; October 14, 1990 (age 36); Victoria, British Columbia, Canada
- Genres: indie rock, swamp rock, folk rock, pop noir
- Occupations: Singer-songwriter, and musician
- Instruments: Vocal, guitar,
- Years active: 2011–present
- Label: Sleepless
- Website: www.kandlemusic.com

Kandle Maria Osborne, professionally known as Kandle, is a Canadian singer-songwriter, based in Montréal, Québec. Kandle is the daughter of 54–40 frontman Neil Osborne. She is originally from Victoria, British Columbia.

== Biography ==
Kandle got her start with The Blue Violets, a band she started with her sister Coral Osborne and friend Louise Burns. It was with them that she fell in love with songwriting and overcame her stage fright, building the foundations of her solo career.

In 2010, she met her musical partner and co-producer Sam Goldberg Jr. (Broken Social Scene, Yardlets) after he had approached her to take press shots for one of his musical projects. She agreed on the condition that he play on some of her songs she was recording. Kandle moved to Montréal to be closer to Goldberg Jr., and they soon founded The Krooks, featuring Jason Kent (The Dears, Sunfields) on bass and vocals, David Deïas on drums and Félix Dyotte and Tim Fletcher (The Stills) on guitars and keyboards. The Krooks became Kandle's backing band.

She independently released her debut EP Kandle on May 29, 2012, to critical acclaim. It was produced by her father and features Goldberg Jr. on guitar and bass.

After touring the EP in North America and Europe, Kandle headed back to the studio with Goldberg and her father on production duty. The resulting album was the widely celebrated In Flames, released on March 4, 2014, on the Québec-based label Dare to Care Records. The video from its lead single "Not Up To Me" was directed by Natalie Rae Robison, featuring a narrative inspired by the struggles of depression and anorexia. It was nominated for a Juno Award and won the Prism Prize Audience Award in 2015. Kandle toured extensively throughout North America and Europe to promote In Flames, sharing the stage with the likes of Lou Doillon and Cœur de pirate and including performances at CMJ, Osheaga, Pop Montreal and M for Montreal.

In 2017, Kandle signed to Toronto-based alternative label Sleepless Records and began recording her second full-length album, titled Holy Smoke. She teamed up with Sam Goldberg (Broken Social Scene), Devon Portielje (Half Moon Run), Graham Walsh (Holy Fuck) and producers John Agnello (Sonic Youth, Kurt Vile, Phosphorescent) and Alex Bonenfant (July Talk, Crystal Castles) to make her most powerful record yet, with songs tackling sexual assault, abuse of power, life on the road, trauma, and pain with vulnerability and force. The first single "When My Body Breaks” was released January 2018, featuring Peter Dreimanis of label mates July Talk and has been nominated for the 2018 JUNO Award for Engineer of the Year (Jason Dufour).

In 2018, Kandle appeared in Jack White's video for “Corporation” from his latest album Boarding House Reach, written and directed by Jodeb. Her own music videos “Bender” (directed by Kat Webber) and “Broken Boys” (directed by Lauren Graham) have been an integral part of Kandle's artistry.

Kandle began playing shows with her father, Neil Osborne, lead singer-guitarist-songwriter for Vancouver band 54-40, billing themselves as A Family Curse. They describe themselves as "pure folk-art worked from found objects (something old, something new)." A Toronto show took place May 8, 2019 at the intimate and tiny 20-capacity Radical Road Brewing Co. The father-daughter duo played later that year on August 7, 2019 as part of Roy Thompson Hall's Live on the Patio series, also in Toronto. These shows were bookended by shows in Montréal, where Kandle still resides, in February and August, 2019.

In May 2020, during lockdown and isolation due to the Coronavirus disease 2019 pandemic, Kandle recorded two new singles, "How Can You Hurt Me" and "Little Bad Things" and released them herself on SoundCloud as she was no longer contracted to Sleepless Records. She described the process of recording while sequestered at her parents' house in Victoria, BC, in detail to Vice Magazine.

Kandle's music has been described as elegiac and moody, with nods to Tom Waits, PJ Harvey and classic blues. She draws inspiration from her own life as a longtime child of the road, as well as her chronic pain caused by migraines.

== Discography ==
Studio albums

- In Flames (2014)
- Holy Smoke (2018)
- Set the Fire (2021)
- Danger To Dream (2026)

Extended Plays

- Kandle - EP (2011)
- Damned If I Do - EP (2018)

Singles

- How Can You Hurt Me (2020)
- Little Bad Things (2020)
- Honey Trap (2021)
- Lazarus (2026)
