= Without Feathers (album) =

Studio album by The Stills
- Released: May 9, 2006
- Recorded: 2005–2006
- Genre: Indie rock
- Length: 43:36 (US); 46:25 (UK)
- Label: Vice
- Producer: Gus Van Go

The Stills chronology
Logic Will Break Your Heart (2003)	Without Feathers (2006)	Oceans Will Rise (2008)

Professional ratings
Aggregate scores
Source	Rating
Metacritic	65/100
Review scores
Source	Rating
AllMusic	3.5/5 stars
NME	8/10
Pitchfork	6.7/10
Prefix Magazine	2.5/5 stars
Rocklouder	2/5 stars
Rolling Stone	2/5 stars

Without Feathers is the second album by Montreal indie rock band the Stills. It was released May 9, 2006 by Vice Records. The album was produced by Gus Van Go.

Emily Haines from fellow indie band Metric appeared on "Baby Blues," while Jason Collett of Broken Social Scene and Sam Roberts were featured on the track "Oh Shoplifter".

The album debuted at No. 6 on the Top Heatseekers chart, but failed to hit the Billboard 200. In Canada, the album did not fare well on the charts. It premiered at No. 51 before moving out of the Top 100 the following week. The album was later released in the UK in 2007 by Drowned in Sound Recordings, including two new tracks.

Without Feathers featured a major personnel change; with the departure of original lead guitarist Greg Paquet, drummer Dave Hamelin moved to guitar and sang lead vocals on the majority of the album's tracks. It was also the first Stills album to feature keyboardist Liam O'Neil as a full-time member, and was the debut for drummer Julien Blais.

The album also marked a big change in sound, from the 1980s-influenced post-punk revivalism of their debut to a happier, more rootsy Americana-oriented approach, which Pitchfork termed "cheerful and heartfelt".

== Track listing ==
=== US/Canada edition ===
No.	Title	Writer(s)	Length
1.	"In the Beginning"	Hamelin	5:45
2.	"The Mountain"	Hamelin, O'Neil	3:57
3.	"She's Walking Out"	Hamelin, O'Neil	3:09
4.	"Helicopters"	Fletcher	4:26
5.	"In the End"	Hamelin, O'Neil	3:45
6.	"Oh Shoplifter"	Hamelin	3:23
7.	"Interlude"	Fletcher, O'Neil	1:08
8.	"Halo the Harpoons"	Corbeil, Fletcher	3:44
9.	"It Takes Time"	Hamelin	4:11
10.	"Destroyer"	Hamelin	3:11
11.	"Baby Blues"	Hamelin	3:32
12.	"The House We Live In"	Hamelin, O'Neil	3:25

=== UK edition ===
No.	Title	Writer(s)	Length
1.	"In the Beginning"	Hamelin	5:44
2.	"Destroyer"	Hamelin	3:11
3.	"Helicopters"	Fletcher	4:23
4.	"The House We Live In"	Hamelin, O'Neil	3:26
5.	"It Takes Time"	Hamelin	4:11
6.	"Monsoon"	Fletcher, Hamelin	3:38
7.	"She's Walking Out"	Hamelin, O'Neil	3:11
8.	"Oh Shoplifter"	Hamelin	3:22
9.	"Outro"	Fletcher, O'Neil	1:10
10.	"Halo the Harpoons"	Corbeil, Fletcher	3:42
11.	"Baby Blues"	Hamelin	3:34
12.	"Retour à Vega"	Faucon, Fletcher, Hamelin, Trenton	2:57
13.	"The Mountain"	Hamelin, O'Neil	3:56

== Personnel ==
The Stills

- Olivier Corbeil – bass guitar, cowbell
- Tim Fletcher – vocals, electric guitar, acoustic guitar
- Dave Hamelin – vocals, electric guitar, acoustic guitar, drums, percussion, additional recording, mixing
- Liam O'Neil – piano, organs, keyboards, saxophone, tambourine, vocals, additional recording

Additional musicians

- Melissa Auf der Maur – handclaps on "Oh Shoplifter"
- Colin Brooks – drums
- "Chip" – trumpet on "Destroyer" and "It Takes Time"
- Evan Cranley – trombone on "Destroyer" and "It Takes Time"
- Kevin Drew – vocals on "She's Walking Out"
- Eric Fares – acoustic guitar on "Oh Shoplifter"
- Emily Haines – vocals on "Baby Blues"
- Mikey Heppner – handclaps on "Oh Shoplifter"
- Neil Johnson – saxophone on "Destroyer" and "It Takes Time"
- Alfie Jurvanen – lead guitar on "In the Beginning" and "She's Walking Out"
- Meghynn Norman – handclaps on "Oh Shoplifter"
- Vincenzo Nudo – percussion on "Oh Shoplifter"
- Elizabeth Powell – vocals on "Monsoon"
- Sam Roberts – acoustic guitar on "Oh Shoplifter"
- Felix Trenton – guitar on "Oh Shoplifter"

Production

- Adam "Bix" Berger – management, vocals on "In the Beginning" and "Destroyer", handclaps on "Oh Shoplifter"
- Werner F. – mixing
- Ryan Morey – mastering
- Cristophe Rihet – photography
- Mathieu Roberge – assistant engineer, handclaps on "Oh Shoplifter"
- Rod Shearer – recording
- Gus van Go – production, recording, mixing, backing vocals, percussion on "Destroyer", cowbell on "Helicopters", guitar on "The House We Live In", tambourine on "She's Walking Out", handclaps on "Oh Shoplifter"
- Patrick Watson – additional recording
