= Hello Master =

Studio album by Priestess
- Released: October 18, 2005
- Recorded: 2005
- Genres: Hard rock, stoner rock
- Length: 40:20
- Labels: Indica, RCA
- Producer: Gus van Go

Priestess chronology
Hello Master (2005)	Prior to the Fire (2009)

Hello Master is the debut studio album by Canadian hard rock band Priestess. Recorded with Gus van Go serving as producer, the album was initially released on October 18, 2005, by Indica Records in Canada and on later dates in other regions. Its lyrics discuss typical rock n' roll themes such as love, violence and death, and its unusual sound for a hard rock record of the time is the result of van Go trying to emulate the sounds of classic rock and metal albums.

The album's music was predominantly written by Mikey Heppner, the band's lead singer and guitarist. Heppner formed Priestess after the Dropouts, his previous act which played punk rock music, fell through as its members left to form the Stills. Their manager van Go signed on to produce Priestess' debut album. None of the music on Hello Master dates back to the Dropouts at all, as it was only written after Heppner decided he was done playing punk rock and wanted to play hard rock instead.

It is best known for spawning the hit "Lay Down", which was included in the video game Guitar Hero III: Legends of Rock, elevating the band's profile drastically. Critics have noted the album's resemblance to legendary acts such as Black Sabbath and AC/DC, who have been cited as a key influence on Priestess; such stylistic similarities had mixed results in reviews, but were not seen as terribly detrimental to the album's overall quality.

== Background and recording ==
Lead singer and guitarist Mikey Heppner formed the punk rock group the Dropouts in the early 2000s merely as a way of having fun performing at shows, after all his bandmates left for New York City to perform as the successful rock band the Stills full-time, he had an epiphany that he could take his own music more seriously, achieve that kind of success, and still have as much fun as he hoped. This, coupled with his first exposure to Tricky Woo (which he enjoyed for their resemblance to Black Sabbath and Deep Purple), led him to re-establish the Dropouts with a different musical style - hard rock - and a more earnest pursuit of success.

The Dropouts experienced a small number of personnel changes that eventually led to the group's current incarnation featuring Dan Watchorn on guitar, Vince Nudo on drums, and Mike Dyball on bass guitar. This lineup existed for no more than a year under the Dropouts name, before the suggestion of Priestess was made. With the band's change in musical style came new songs; no song on Hello Master dates back to before they called themselves Priestess.

Hello Master was recorded at the Boiler Room in New York City. When mastering the album, the group knew they wanted "I Am the Night, Colour Me Black" to be the lead track, and "Everything That You Are" to be the first track on side B of a vinyl release; consequently, "Everything That You Are" was put in the middle of the track list. The process of deciding the order in which the tracks were listed took about a week and a half.

== Music and lyrics ==
Gus van Go was known for having helmed the debut album by the Stills, whom he managed and whose success felt reassuring for Priestess. Heppner told the Montreal Mirror in December 2005 that he trusted van Go's judgment and that the producer "had every drum sound and guitar sound already figured out before he even pressed 'record'". The producer employed such things as shakers, tambourines, and vocal treatments, and Heppner has also stated that piano was occasionally used on the album for its "percussive" quality. In particular, cowbell was used on "Run Home". Even though the polished sound of the record was initially welcomed by the band as being something "different" for a hard rock record, the result of van Go emulating the sounds of well-known older metal records, the group came to be rather dissatisfied with it over time. While initially liking the idea, Heppner later described the album as merely being twelve of their songs in recorded form, and not actually intended to represent the group's live sound; the band pride themselves on their concert performances the most. In comparison to Prior to the Fire, the next album Priestess recorded, he said Hello Master is "a really weird sounding album [where] everything is so tight and really produced."

"We liked the idea and -- at the time -- thought it was a good one. We justified it as that we'd be a band of two beasts, how the record sounds and how we sound live."

— Mikey Heppner on the album's sound compared to the group's stage performance

Nine of the songs were written by Heppner himself, with guitarist Dan Watchorn writing two and drummer Vince Nudo writing one ("Blood") but the band collectively arranged the work, suggesting various alterations to existing material and combining it into one cohesive whole; their next album would feature greater input from all band members, and the songwriting process would be more communal.

The music on the album has often been described as a revival of classic rock 'n' roll with its use of things such as guitar solos. The band have denied that they set out to be any kind of revivalist act, with Heppner noting, "I know what they're intending to say. We remind people of some of the classic bands they love and they compare us to them. It's well intentioned. But we didn't start out to be a seventies rock band. We play rock music the way we think it should be played. And that includes guitar solos." The songs follow typical verse-chorus-verse structures, which Watchorn noted the band felt the need to transcend to some extent with their songwriting for Prior to the Fire.

Hello Master was largely written about typical rock and metal themes, ranging from the obvious to the obscure. One recurring theme on the album is death, set to ironically upbeat music. In particular, "Lay Down" is about a man who murders his wife, and "Two Kids" relates the discovery of the bodies of two dead children. Watchorn wrote the latter after conceiving of the opening lyrics which he said "haunted [him] for days"; he quickly realized it would be a rather dark song once he began developing the song further. The mystery behind the two deaths is never solved in the song. Although he did not specify, he said later that there were songs on this record that referred to films, which were cited as a greater source of inspiration for Prior to the Fire.

Continuing the theme of death, "No Real Pain" contains lyrics about facing hardship, and mortality in particular. After the passing of Piggy, the guitarist from Voivod, the band dedicated the song to him in concert for a short time. In concert, the song features a drum solo that does not appear on the record. "Living Like a Dog" also features an extended jam that increases the song's length by a considerable amount of time in the live setting.

The Fanzine's Richard Parks, interviewing Mikey Heppner, noted that many of the album's lyrics were threatening in some way; in addition to the aforementioned references to death, other songs have dark subtexts. "Time Will Cut You Down" has a straightforward message of "one frustrated person warning someone else", according to Heppner, while "Talk to Her" seemed according to Parks to be a distorted take on the Beatles song "She Loves You". "In 'She Loves You', the guy is trying to help his friend who's in a relationship," explained Parks, "but in 'Talk to Her' it becomes a threat - more like, I'm going to take your girl away from you." Heppner remarked that a closer comparison would be to the other Beatles tune "You're Going to Lose That Girl", whose message about losing in a relationship was similarly blunt. Heppner acknowledged that the songs "fit together" with regard to their apparent similarities in subject matter, but denied the presence of an intentional unifying theme around which the songs were written.

The album's closing song, "Blood", was written and sung by drummer Vince Nudo, who is an avid vampire mythology enthusiast. The song centers on a conflict between good and evil, the latter personified as a vampire. Intentionally leaving the song open to interpretation as to whether the conflict depicted is a literal one, Nudo said, "I think everyone has encountered a vampire (off the screen or pages of a book). I guess the hero is the good guy who sees what's coming and battles their way out. But in this song the good guy loses."

"Everything That You Are" features a 25-second straight vamp on one chord; the song was not written this way but the band had the idea to make it so during pre-production, loving the idea.

== Packaging and title ==
The original cover art for the album

The album had a different cover upon its initial release in Canada, designed by Jac Currie; when RCA asked if the band wanted to change the cover art, the band agreed. Heppner explained that although initially he was enthusiastic about the cover, he later became embarrassed by it as he felt it was too garish. Its eventual replacement was a painting done by Arik Roper, who reportedly made the entire painting on a deadline of four days. Heppner considered Roper to be his favorite painter at the time and wanted the new album cover to be a painting akin to a cover such as that of In the Court of the Crimson King. Roper had previously designed a T-shirt for Priestess, so the band had established a rapport with him by that point and after Heppner made the request (supplying the key words "crazy, sunset, weird, landscape, mountains, trippy"), he was able to create the new cover art on short notice.

The giant hand on the cover was an afterthought; when the painting lacked the hand, Heppner loved the new cover but felt only that something was missing. He randomly suggested a hand, and Roper responded by taking a picture of his own hand and superimposing it on the image, emailing the group the result two hours later. He did not paint the hand; he merely inserted it with a software program.

The album's name has no significance and was chosen arbitrarily. It was only the latest in a series of suggestions the band members made to each other; they had been suggesting and debating names for a time but did not like any of them, until Vince Nudo simply recommended the two words "Hello Master". Heppner noted that the group were specifically avoiding calling it Priestess.

== Release and reception ==
Professional ratings
Review scores
Source	Rating
AllMusic	4.5/5 stars
Bullz-Eye	4/5 stars
Hour	4.5/5 stars
IGN	6.6/10
Metro Times	Favorable
Pitchfork	7.3/10
Prefix	6.0/10
Sputnikmusic	3.0/5
Ultimate Guitar	7/10 stars

After releasing the album on October 18, 2005, in Canada via Indica Records, Priestess signed a contract with RCA Records in January 2006 to handle distribution for the band in the rest of the world; the label released the album in remastered form in the United States on June 13, 2006, and would later dissolve the band's contract after feeling dissatisfied with the material on their follow-up album, Prior to the Fire, for the last time. Hello Master was released on May 14, 2007, in the United Kingdom.

"Lay Down" became arguably the band's best-known song due to its inclusion in the rhythm game Guitar Hero III: Legends of Rock, which was one of the best-selling video games of 2007. On the band's upsurge in popularity due to a video game, the band have affirmed that they remain very proud of the achievement, and believe that such video games are a perfectly valid way of exposing younger generations to music. Heppner noted that as the song's composer he considered it easier to play on a real guitar than the game, in answer to a question he was routinely asked by people after the game became popular.

The album drew a mixed critical reaction, with many reviewers commenting favorably on it but criticizing its traditional rock sound. The staff of Ultimate Guitar enjoyed the album, rating it 7 stars out of 10, but declared that it "seems to be frozen in the '70s", criticizing Heppner's singing and the overt influences from bands such as AC/DC, Black Sabbath and Motörhead (even though Heppner has stated he is not a Motörhead fan), but otherwise praising the group for the song "Time Will Cut You Down" and the cowbell on "Run Home". Tom Breihan wrote for Pitchfork that Hello Master was largely derivative of some of the aforementioned acts plus Ted Nugent, but noted that that was not necessarily a bad thing; Breihan mainly disliked "Living Like a Dog" but praised "Talk to Her" and "Time Will Cut You Down", the latter in particular for its chorus, and gave the record 7.3 points out of 10. Prefix writer Zach Hothorn, giving the album a 6.0 out of 10, considered "Time Will Cut You Down" as "a nice reprieve from the incessant open-A Angus Young riffing", and criticized "Blood" as "sound[ing] like an afterthought" and compared it to Queens of the Stone Age. Rating the album 3.0 out of 5 and suggesting that the band were having a crisis of musical identity on the record, as the album art seemed indicative of a different style of music than was present on the album, Sputnikmusic staff reviewer Irving Tan wrote that the second half of the album strove too diligently to mimic Metallica, Black Sabbath and Budgie, except for closing track "Blood" (which he said was the album's "most intriguing" song and evidence of the band's true potential). IGN's Chad Grishow gave a mixed review of 6.6 out of 10 and explained that "Two Kids" (mistakenly identifying Heppner as singing lead vocals on that song) and "Blood" (which he said sounded like a "completely different band" and would have been most fitting as a B-side) were the best tracks on the album, but that Priestess were inferior to like-minded "retro sound[ing]" contemporaries Wolfmother.

Not all reviews chided the band for bringing their forerunners to mind, however. AllMusic's Eduardo Rivadavia reviewed the album favorably and gave it 4.5 stars out of 5, enjoying the traces of classic rock influence he heard and only criticizing the finale "Blood" for being too evocative of Queens of the Stone Age. Jamie O'Meara for Hour magazine gave a near-perfect score of 4.5 out of 5 stars, and complimented the band on their classic rock sound, arguing they demonstrate a familiarity with the true roots of rock music and a desire to respect its heritage rather than claim they invented it. Bullz-Eye also noted the unwitting Queens of the Stone Age homage with "Blood"; reviewer James Eldred otherwise commended Priestess for having "recognizable riffs and chords" in the vein of "Smoke on the Water" and "Iron Man", scoring the record 4 out of 5 stars. Drawing many comparisons to classic rock acts such as Black Sabbath, Def Leppard and AC/DC, Michael Alan Goldberg of the Metro Times heavily praised the band's work on Hello Master, often specifically for having skills comparable to such acts (and also noting that Heppner's vocals bear resemblance to those of Chris Cornell's older work) without being frozen in the past.

The album's promotion was largely done via constant appearances in concert. One of Priestess' earliest accomplishments was being selected as the opening act for several Canadian dates on a Motörhead tour in 2005. Dates supporting the Sword and Early Man in the US followed in February and March 2006, and North American tour dates opening for Dinosaur Jr. followed that spring. The band continued to perform concerts in the US with Riverboat Gamblers and the Bronx in June, Gwar in August, Nashville Pussy in September, and Black Label Society and Black Stone Cherry from October until December. The following year, Priestess still added to their rigorous US touring schedule, as they supported Converge and Mastodon in concert from late January to February 2007. In June, the band supported Megadeth on a series of dates in the UK.

Priestess released a music video for "Run Home" in July 2006, and for "Lay Down" in September, the latter directed by Wendy Morgan of Revolver Productions.

== Track listing ==
All tracks are written by Priestess, except where noted.

No.	Title	Lead vocals	Length
1.	"I Am the Night, Colour Me Black"		3:14
2.	"Lay Down"		3:05
3.	"Run Home"		3:36
4.	"Two Kids"	Dan Watchorn	2:17
5.	"Talk to Her" (Priestess, Adam Berger, Gustavo Coriandoli)		3:10
6.	"Time Will Cut You Down"		5:05
7.	"Everything That You Are"		3:25
8.	"The Shakes"		3:21
9.	"Performance"		3:41
10.	"Living Like a Dog"		3:01
11.	"No Real Pain"		3:01
12.	"Blood"	Vince Nudo	3:17
Total length:			40:20

== Personnel ==
=== Priestess ===
- Mikey Heppner – lead guitar, lead vocals (except where noted)
- Vince Nudo – drums, backing vocals
- Dan Watchorn – rhythm guitar, backing vocals
- Mike Dyball – bass guitar

=== Additional personnel ===
- Gus Van Go – producer, mixing
- Werner F. – mixing, guitar solo on "No Real Pain"
- Colin Lane – photography
- Arik Roper – illustration
- Priestess & Frank Harkins – art direction
- Tom Baker – audio mastering at Precision Mastering
- Tom Siler – organ on "Lay Down"

Credits taken from 2006 edition.

== Usage in gaming ==
"Talk to Her" is featured in NHL 07, while "I Am The Night, Colour Me Black" is featured in NHL 2K8 and Need for Speed: Carbon.

"Lay Down" is featured in Guitar Hero 3: Legends of Rock.

"No Real Pain" is featured in Tony Hawk's Downhill Jam.

== Chart positions ==
=== Singles ===
Year	Single	Chart	Peak position	Source
2006	"Talk to Her"	Mainstream Rock Tracks	33	
