= Let's roll (disambiguation) =

Let's roll is a catchphrase for moving and starting an activity, attack, mission, or project.

Let's roll may also refer to:

- Let's Roll (album), a 2003 blues album by Etta James
- "Let's Roll", a song by Adina Howard from her album The Second Coming
- "Let's Roll", a song by Montreal band The Stills from their album Logic Will Break Your Heart
- "Let's Roll", a 2011 song by Yelawolf
- "Let's Roll", a song by Zzbra from the album Zzbra: Original Motion Picture Soundtrack, 2012
- "Let's Roll", a song by Neil Young from his album Are You Passionate?
- Let's Roll, a series by comedy gaming group Achievement Hunter, in which they play board games
