= Low Level Flight =

Canadian alternative-rock band

- Also known as: LLF
- Origin: Toronto, Ontario, Canada
- Genres: Alternative rock
- Years active: 2006–present
- Labels: Angeline Entertainment; I Heart Records; Fontana North; Time's Music India; Brave Rekords
- Members: Ryan Malcolm; Sebastien Duhaime; James Rooke; Hugh Allen; Brandon Merenick
- Website: www.facebook.com/lowlevelflight/

Low Level Flight (also known as LLF) is a Canadian five-piece alternative rock band formed in 2006 in Toronto by lead singer Ryan Malcolm. They have released two albums so far: Urgency (2007) and Through These Walls (2011). LLF toured much of Canada, the US, Mexico and Asia in support of their debut album, which was produced by Mike Borkosky. The band had three top ten videos and two top 40 singles from the album. LLF spent much of 2010 writing and recording Through These Walls with acclaimed producer Gus van Go, with distribution through Fontana North.

Past members include Mike Vanderzand, Simon Vanderzand who performed drums and guitar on Urgency album, Shaun Noronha and Ryan Gavel of No Warning. Noronha left the band after the birth of his son.

== Formation ==
Ryan Malcolm released his debut solo album, Home in 2003, which was nominated for a Juno Award for Best Pop Album in 2004. In 2006, he formed Low Level Flight.

== Career ==
=== Urgency (2007–2009) ===
Low Level Flight released their debut album, Urgency on March 27, 2007. Three singles were released from the album: "Change for Me", "Say" and "Turnaround". "Say" was the highest-charting single from the album, peaking at No. 22 on the Canadian Hot 100 chart. All three songs were radio hits and all three corresponding videos hit number-one in Canada.

Earlier in 2006, LLF had embarked on their first tour of Canada to promote their debut record. They later toured Mexico and the United States.

In November 2007, LLF was named "CHUM Networks Emerging Artist". In December 2007, LLF were musical guests on the television show Canadian Idol alongside Hedley. They were invited to attend the 2008 MuchMusic Video Awards.

In July 2008, LLF opened for Bon Jovi for the band's Canadian Festival Date. In 2009, the band signed a deal with the Times of India and released their album in India, which was followed by a short tour in the country.

LLF recently played with Interpol at Toronto's Sound Academy to a sold out crowd of 3000+.

=== Through These Walls (2010–present) ===
LLF started working on their second album in early 2010. The album, titled Through These Walls, was released May 3, 2011, and saw the band garner top ten video and top 30 single in its first week of release. The band flew to Europe for their first tour of the UK that same release week. LLF played festivals throughout Canada and Europe in the summer of 2011.

== Band members ==
- Ryan Malcolm - lead vocals, acoustic guitar.
- James Rooke - rhythm guitar.
- Sebastien Duhaime - bass.
- Hugh Allen - lead guitar.
- Brandon Merenick - drums, percussion.

Former members

- Shaun Noronha - bass.
- Dave Carter - lead guitar

== Discography ==
=== Albums ===
Year	Album details	Peak	Certifications (sales threshold)
Year	Album details	CA	Certifications (sales threshold)
2007	Urgency: Release date: March 27, 2007; Label: I Heart Records/Times of India; Format: CD, digital download	—	CAN: 8,500; IND: 3,500
2011	Through These Walls: Release date: May 8, 2011; Label: I Heart Records/Brave Rekords; Format: LP, digital download	—	
"—" denotes the album failed to chart.

=== Singles ===
Year	Single	Peak	Album
Year	Single	CAN Alt	Album
2007	"Change for Me"	35	Urgency
2007	"Say"	7	Urgency
2008	"Turnaround"	—	Urgency
2011	"Cash Machine"	22	Through These Walls
2011	"Brooklyn Radio"	31	Through These Walls
"—" denotes the song failed to chart.

=== Music videos ===
Year	Single	Album
2007	"Change For Me"	Urgency
2007	"Say"	Urgency
2008	"Turnaround"	Urgency
2011	"Cash Machine"	Through These Walls
2011	"Brooklyn Radio"	Through These Walls
2012	"Tsk Tsk"	Through These Walls
