= Home (Ryan Malcolm album) =

Studio album by Ryan Malcolm
- Released: December 9, 2003
- Genre: Pop
- Label: Bmg Int'l

Ryan Malcolm chronology
Home (2003)	Urgency (2007)

Singles from Home
- 1. "Something More" Released: September 30, 2003; 2. "Star of All Planets" Released: 2003; 3. "You made This Fool Become A Man" Released: 2003

Home is the debut album from Ryan Malcolm, who was the winner of the first season of Canadian Idol. The album was released on December 9, 2003.

== Reception ==
=== Commercial performance ===
The album debuted and peaked at #4 on the Canadian Albums Chart. The album was later certified platinum, selling over 170,000 copies.

=== Critical reception ===
The album received a "bad" rating from NOW's Sarah Liss, who wrote "The tunes on Home are as watered-down, radio-friendly and lyrically vapid as you'd expect, but they're all over the musical map, jumping from whiny soul-lite to wannabe Loverboy 80s rawk to Simple Plan-worthy punk-pop."

In a lukewarm review, David Hayden of The Coast wrote "It doesn’t feel like Malcolm really cares about these tunes, as he never really sinks his teeth in like he did during the competition."

== Awards ==
Despite receiving mostly negative reviews, the album earned a Juno nomination for Best Pop Album in 2004.

== Singles ==
- "Something More", the debut single from the album, was released on radio the day after Malcolm's win and to the public on September 30, 2003. The single went four times platinum on the first day of its release and stayed at #1 on the Canadian Singles Chart for 14 consecutive weeks.
- The second single, ""Star of All the Planets," peaked at #79 on the Canadian Singles Chart.
- The third single, "You Made This Fool Become a Man," failed to chart.

== Track listing ==
1. "Star Of All Planets"
2. "Straight Up The Middle"
3. "Crash & Burn"
4. "You Made This Fool Become A Man"
5. "Absolutely Perfect"
6. "I Gotta Be Me"
7. "Memory Lane"
8. "Home"
9. "Ride"
10. "October Skies"
11. "Don't Dream It's Over" (with Gary Beals)
12. "Something More"
13. "Nothing Left To Say"
14. "Good Girls"
15. "Your Heart Will Know"

== Personnel ==
- Guitar: Bobby Cameron, Chris Perry, Davey Johnstone, David Martin, Peter Mueller, Bryan Potvin, Joey Serlin
- Bass: Bob Basa, Bob Birch, Orin Isaacs, Chris Perry
- Keyboards: Adam Alexander, Derek Brin, David Tyson, Rob Wells
- Drums: Vinnie Colaiuta, Wilson Laurencin, Kenny Moran
- Percussion: Derek Brin, Rob Wells
- Strings: Daniel Blackman, Lenny Solomon, Wendy Solomon, Kathryn Sugden
- Background Vocals: Jenna Gawne, David Tyson
