= Terra Lightfoot =

Canadian musician

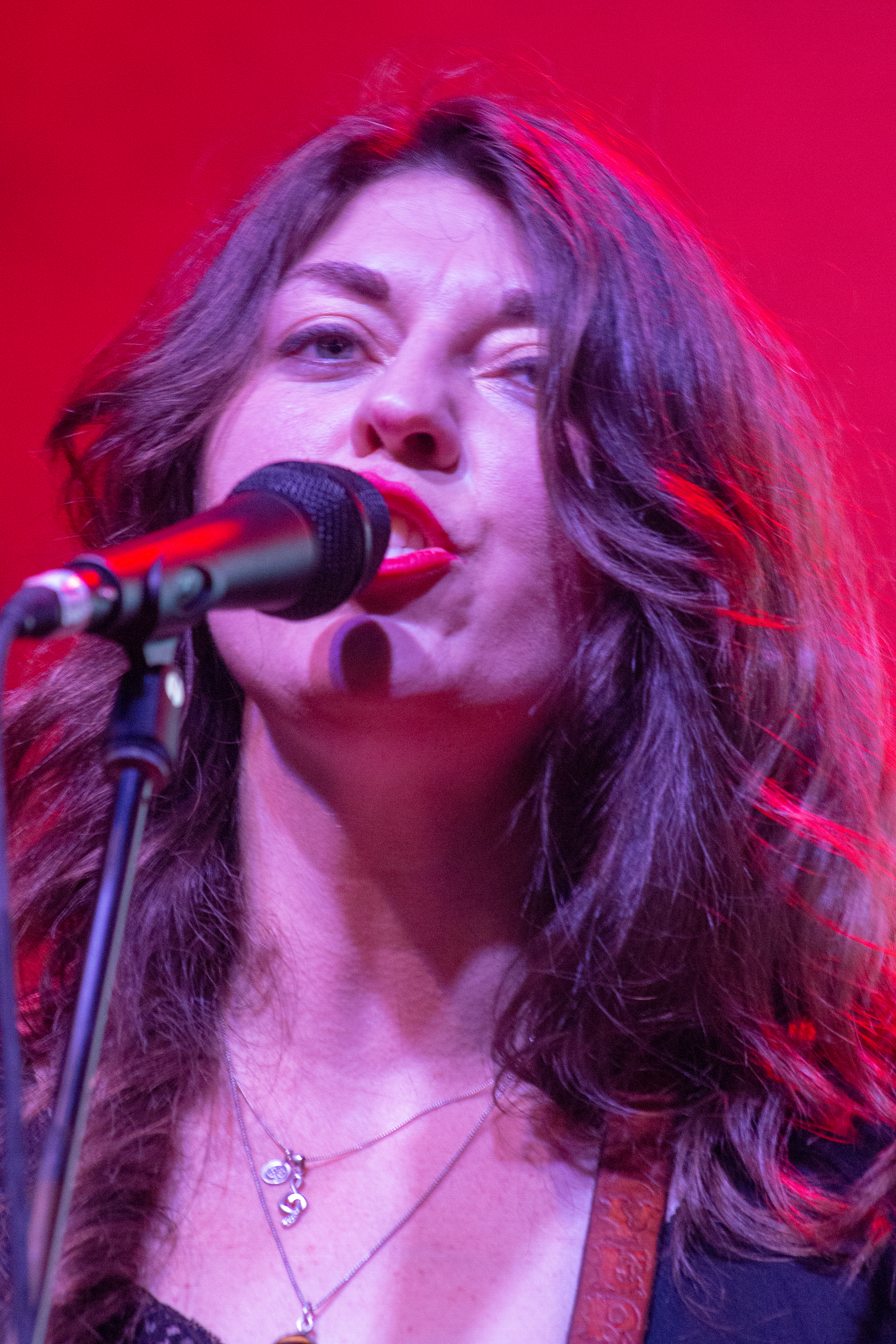
- Lightfoot performing at Supercrawl in Hamilton, ON in 2018

Background information
- Born: August 1986 (age 40); Waterdown, Ontario, Canada
- Genres: Folk; roots rock
- Occupations: Musician; singer; songwriter
- Instruments: Vocals; electric guitar
- Years active: 2010–present
- Website: terralightfoot.com

Terra Lightfoot (born August 1986) is a Canadian musician from Hamilton, Ontario who has released four albums with the independent music label Sonic Unyon Recording Company and is distributed by Universal Music Group in Canada and The Orchard outside of Canada. She performs in a folk and roots rock style known for bold vocals and electric guitar riffs.

== Early life ==
Lightfoot was raised in Waterdown, Ontario, a rural community in the northern part of Hamilton, and attended McMaster University.

== Early career ==
In the early 2010s Lightfoot was a member of the Dinner Belles, a group of country-folk performers from Hamilton. She performed as a guitarist and vocalist for the group's 2014 studio album The River and the Willow, having previously appeared on their self-released 2011 debut West Simcoe County.

Through indie music label, Sonic Unyon, Lightfoot released her first solo album, self-titled and released in 2011, was described as "subdued", with compositions characteristic of a modern folk singer-songwriter.

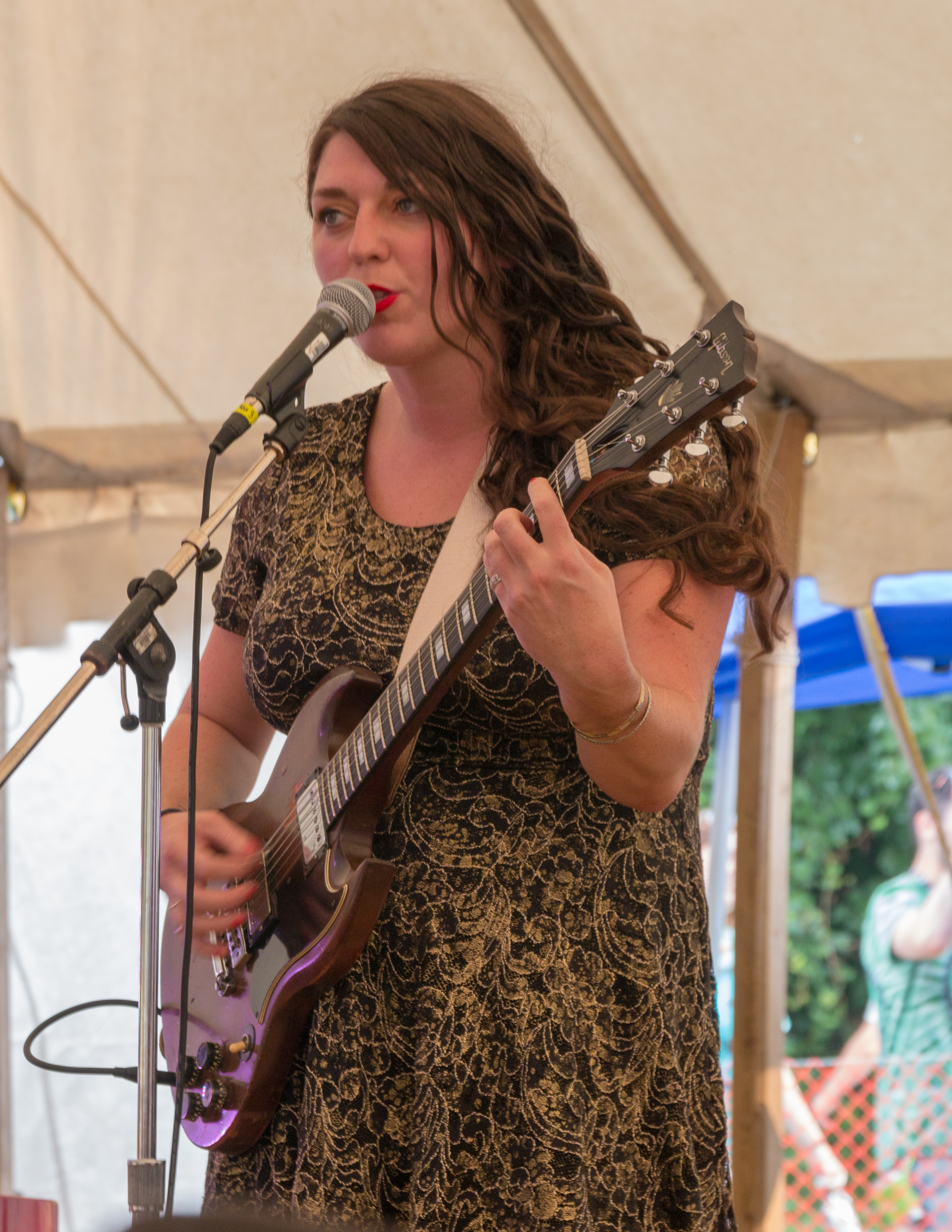
Lightfoot performing at Hillside Festival in 2015

Her second solo album, 2014's Every Time My Mind Runs Wild, saw her collaborate with indie rockers Gus van Go, Werner F, and Liam O'Neil (known for his performances with the group The Stills). The album's producers, van Go and F, were credited with bringing a more catchy, hook-heavy, power pop style.

In 2017, Terra Lightfoot released two new albums. In February she released orchestral collaboration Live in Concert. In late summer, Lightfoot released "Paradise," the lead single from her third studio album, New Mistakes. The record earned praise from critics at No Depression, Pop Matters, Guitar Player, Twangville, and The Boot.

New Mistakes earned Lightfoot a nomination for a 2018 JUNO Award for Adult Alternative Album of the Year. The album's single "Paradise" also earned producer van Go a 2018 JUNO nomination for Recording Engineer of the Year, as well as a long-list nomination for the 2018 Polaris Music Prize.

In August 2020, Lightfoot released a new single, "Paper Thin Walls," from her fourth studio album, Consider the Speed. That album was released on October 16, 2020.

Her 2023 album Healing Power was a longlisted nominee for the 2024 Polaris Music Prize, and received a Juno Award nomination for Adult Alternative Album of the Year at the Juno Awards of 2025.

In October 2025, Lightfoot released the album Home Front, recorded at her home. She says "it was recorded in the living room, on the back porch, in the relaxing moments after dinner or the late evening, when the crickets and peepers were singing their loudest"

== Musical style ==
Lightfoot has a multi-octave mezzo-soprano singing voice that has been compared to that of Joan Jett and Dusty Springfield. Her electric guitar style has been described as similar to John Fogerty and Van Morrison. The songs for which Lightfoot is best known are described as bluesy-rock power ballads.

March 2018 Lightfoot was featured in Guitar Player Magazine along with her SG 'Veronica'.

== Touring ==
Lightfoot has toured extensively in the United States, Canada, and the United Kingdom, performing at folk music festivals and intimate venues. In 2017 she was honoured by the Canadian Independent Music Association for being a touring musician selling at least 25,000 concert seats in a 12-month period.

While touring her 2017 album New Mistakes, Lightfoot also created, curated, and co-headlined The Longest Road Show, an all-female touring revue.

On tour, Lightfoot has collaborated with a famous Canadian singer forty years her senior, Gordon Lightfoot, though the two are not related. She has also toured with The Posies, Toad the Wet Sprocket, Bruce Cockburn and Blue Rodeo. She supported Willie Nelson on the lone Canadian date of the 2018 Outlaw Music Festival.

== Discography ==
=== Studio albums ===
- Terra Lightfoot (2011)
- Every Time My Mind Runs Wild (2015)
- New Mistakes (2017)
- Consider the Speed (2020)
- Healing Power (2023)
- Home Front (2025)

=== Live albums ===
- Live in Concert (2017)

== Awards and nominations ==
=== JUNO Awards ===
- New Mistakes (Sonic Unyon) - Nominee, Adult Alternative Album of the Year, 2018

=== Polaris Music Prize ===
- New Mistakes (Sonic Unyon) - Long List, 2018
- Healing Power (Sonic Unyon) - Long List, 2024
