= Priestess (band) =

Canadian rock band

Background information
- Origin: Montreal, Quebec, Canada
- Genres: Hard rock, stoner rock, heavy metal
- Years active: 2002–2012
- Labels: Indica, RCA, Tee Pee
- Members: Mikey Heppner; Mike Dyball; Vince Nudo; Dan Watchorn

Priestess was a Canadian hard rock/stoner rock band formed by singer/guitarist Mikey Heppner in Montreal, Quebec in 2002, comprising Heppner, singer/guitarist Dan Watchorn, singer/drummer Vince Nudo, and bassist Mike Dyball. Priestess were considered one of the most important bands in the early millennial "retro rock" movement, although they denied intentionally attempting to emulate the sounds of classic rock bands such as Black Sabbath and AC/DC, whom they idolized and to whom they were frequently compared.

Priestess was established in the early 2000s after all but one of the members of punk band The Dropouts left the band. The sole remaining member, Heppner, sought new bandmates after changing the group's sound, and after a name change they released their first album, Hello Master, on independent record label Indica in 2005. Initially only released in Canada, the album was noticed and released by RCA Records internationally the following year, and the single "Lay Down" brought the band much success after being included in the popular video game Guitar Hero III: Legends of Rock. RCA disliked Prior to the Fire, the result of the group's attempt at a second album, as the label feared its progressive rock-influenced sound would not be marketable; the band subsequently left the label and the album's serially-delayed 2009 release occurred in Canada on Indica, followed by an international 2010 release on independent label Tee Pee Records.

In 2012, the band announced the postponement of the release of a third album and cancellation of a European tour. There was no subsequent activity and, although no formal split was announced, the band is considered defunct, its members having since pursued other musical projects.

== History ==
=== As The Dropouts (2002–2004) ===
Mikey Heppner attended Vanier College in Montreal to major in music and find other Frank Zappa fans like himself to start a band with. He found no one suitable for the job; he described the people he met there as "all elevator jazz geeks" and became discouraged about being able to form an experimental band. Heppner discarded his experimental rock goals entirely after being inspired to form a punk rock band instead; a friend he met at Vanier named Olivier Corbeil took him to see a punk band in concert, which enthralled him so much he formed The Dropouts with Corbeil, Tim Fletcher and Dave Hamelin to partake of the same high energy he saw at that performance. The Dropouts played their first show on September 10, 2001, at the Jailhouse Rock Cafe in Montreal. Heppner wrote "really simple Ramones-type of songs" for the group while the other three members achieved gradual fame in their side project, the Stills. Heppner had no lasting ambitions for The Dropouts, who only recorded a demo, but performed dozens of live shows around Montreal until June 2002. After the Stills left for New York City in 2002 to continue on their own, Heppner felt surprised by their success.

Heppner changed his musical goals and decided to reform The Dropouts later in 2002, this time hoping for a more serious project in the vein of Tricky Woo (and their resemblance to Deep Purple and Black Sabbath). Future guitarist Dan Watchorn, who also moved to Montreal to attend college, was inactive musically when Heppner asked him to join the group. After hearing a demo of songs Heppner had been working on, Watchorn agreed to join. Mike Dyball auditioned for the band as bassist and quickly invited his friend, drummer Jonny Knowles (who was later replaced in 2003). Heppner discovered Vince Nudo when the latter played a concert with another band in the club at which Heppner worked as a disc jockey; Heppner was impressed by his performance. Recalling the performance, Heppner asked Nudo to join The Dropouts once Jonny was fired after a dozen shows. Heppner felt certain he had found all the right people for the group when their first jam session with Nudo resulted in a new song. At this point, the band was still performing as The Dropouts; they would not take on the name Priestess until October 2004. The new name was eventually chosen only based on how "heavy" it sounded, but it led to the misconception that they were trying to be a heavy metal band (a claim they have repeatedly denied), and Watchorn has explained that it also leads some concertgoers to think they are "an all-female Judas Priest cover band".

The Dropouts were signed to Montreal record label Indica Records in July 2004 and immediately began pre-production of their debut album with producer Gus van Go, planning for a spring 2005 release. Once the album pre-production was completed, and at the insistence of Indica Records, the band began looking for a new band name. The band played their last show as The Dropouts on September 30, 2004, at La Sala Rossa in Montreal, as part of the POP Montreal festival.

=== Early years as Priestess (2004–2007) ===
Priestess debuted live only eleven days after their last show as The Dropouts, performing at Main Hall in Montreal on October 11, 2004. The band finished recording its debut album in January 2005 but it was held back from release for nearly a year. In March, Priestess played the South by Southwest festival. They then embarked on an Eastern Canadian tour with Motörhead in late April and early May. The tour took them from Ontario to Nova Scotia.

The band's debut album, Hello Master, was produced by the Stills' producer, Gus van Go, and released on October 18, 2005, on Indica Records in Canada. After its release, the group admitted to being dissatisfied with its sound; Heppner described the album rather apathetically as "just the recorded version of twelve of our songs", and as "a really weird sounding album [where] everything is so tight and really produced". Critics took note of the album's hard rock style, sometimes to point out that it was not terribly unique; some criticized the classic rock-influenced style on Hello Master as being repetitive and stale, while others enjoyed it for that very reason. Comparisons to Black Sabbath were frequent, as were others to AC/DC and even Motörhead (even though Heppner has never been a fan of Motörhead, who ironically had taken them on tour). Hour magazine specifically pointed-out that the comparisons to Priestess' spiritual ancestors actually proved the band were trying to pay respect to their musical roots instead of claiming a unique style. Heppner was somewhat taken aback to learn of the impression critics were under; he noted that the album sounded "pretty modern" to him and the group did not consider the record to be a metal one at any point during its creation.

To promote the album, Priestess committed to a regular touring schedule which saw them frequently being selected to support more well-known acts. Motörhead took notice of Priestess and made them the opening act on several dates in Canada in 2005 before the release of Hello Master. RCA Records noticed the group and signed them in January 2006, becoming their label for all territories outside of Canada, remastering Hello Master and releasing it internationally, beginning with the United States on June 13. After the Canadian release, the group spent early 2006 supporting the Sword, Early Man, and Dinosaur Jr. in North America, and spent much of the rest of the year in the US with bands such as Gwar, Nashville Pussy, and Black Label Society. Their schedule continued well into 2007 as they traveled with Mastodon in the US and made their first appearance in the UK supporting Megadeth for several dates.

The single "Lay Down" was included in the video game Guitar Hero III: Legends of Rock, which elevated the band's profile drastically. Enthusiastic about the success of that game, Heppner has stated he believes Guitar Hero and such games to be perfectly valid ways of finding new music, noting that his first exposure to Black Sabbath was through the Super NES video game Rock n' Roll Racing, and Vince Nudo has given the genre credit for its potential to expose younger generations to classic rock. Another single from the album, "Talk to Her", peaked at #33 on the Mainstream Rock Tracks chart in 2006. Album track "Everything That You Are" was on the soundtrack of ATV Offroad Fury 4. Priestess were voted Montreal's heaviest band by readers of the Montreal Mirror in 2006.

As their busy touring schedule left them little time to write new material, Priestess only began work on a follow-up album in the summer of 2007. Heppner began writing things that were inspired by listening to progressive rock in his youth, which he felt made the work he created too esoteric for his bandmates to enjoy. When he did show them the material he was working on, they instead loved it, and as a whole began adding minor progressive rock characteristics to their sound in an effort to challenge themselves.

=== Prior to the Fire, dispute with RCA and departure for Tee Pee Records (2008–2011) ===
Priestess' second album, however, was constantly impeded before, during, and after recording. All throughout, RCA debated with the band over whether any of the songs were worthy of being singles that could sell the album substantially. RCA first delayed the beginning of the recording process trying to force them to write more songs, then delayed the album release by asking the same thing again, which the group refused. The production process itself was plagued with problems that prolonged it, as any producer hired before David Schiffman quit the project and after recording had begun in Los Angeles, the police forced them to change studios to avoid noise violation penalties.

Because of the disagreements, Priestess were relinquished from their contract with RCA and allowed to release the finished product, which was completed in the fall of 2008 and became Prior to the Fire, on another label—a compromise for which the band still respect RCA. Tee Pee Records, who had approached the band in their early days before they decided to sign with RCA who offered them more money, subsequently signed the group and the release finally occurred. Indica Records waited until the band had an international label before releasing Prior to the Fire, and released it in Canada on October 20, 2009, while the international release occurred early the following year. David Schiffman's more-relaxed approach to recording led to a sound for the record the band were more satisfied with; his production style was summarized as "[being] about recording it and not fucking with it", avoiding such studio tools as click tracks or editing, resulting in a record that more closely mirrors the band's live sound than Hello Master does. They have also expressed feeling more comfortable being signed to Tee Pee than to RCA.

The album was critically well-received, though some reviewers did not view the stylistic departure from Hello Master favorably. Rock Sound compared the group to Thin Lizzy and Baroness in a positive way, but Pitchfork declared the album could not compare to a record such as High on Fire's Snakes for the Divine. Other reviewers concluded the long wait between the group's two records was worth it.

In spite of delaying concert plans due to their inability to schedule recording dates, Priestess continued to tour ceaselessly after finishing the album, making a Canadian tour with Bison B.C. in November 2008, and touring the US again in the spring of 2009 with Gwar and Cattle Decapitation. Following its release, the group performed with such acts as Early Man, High on Fire, and new labelmates Naam in North America, and Bigelf in Europe and the UK. A music video for "Lady Killer" was released on February 4, 2010.

=== Attempted third album and hiatus (2012) ===
Priestess had planned to embark on a tour of Europe in the spring of 2012, including a concert at the Roadburn Festival in the Netherlands. Without explanation, these plans were cancelled. They had been working on and would have released a new album by that time, but no announcement has been made regarding a third Priestess album since then.

On September 3, 2012, after a long period of silence (which he attributed to issues for all the band members he was not at liberty to discuss), Heppner posted to the band's Facebook page via his own account to explain that the band lacked confidence in the material being recorded for their third album, and elected to simply "let it happen naturally". There was no subsequent update, and members have since engaged in other musical projects. Heppner formed garage rock outfit UBT (formerly Uncle Bad Touch), and during a 2013 feature on UBT, Planet S Magazine noted the "rumoured demise" of Priestess. In 2014–2015, Heppner was singer and guitarist in Beat Cops, with former Dropouts bandmate Tim Fletcher and Max Hébert of Les Breastfeeders; the Montreal Gazette described Heppner as "former singer/guitarist for ... Priestess". Vince Nudo became the drummer for Kurt Vile's backing band, the Violators, and has also formed Frères Lumières, a film-scoring group, with bandmate Dan Watchorn. Mike Dyball has been playing bass guitar for metal band WetMetal.

== Musical style ==
"We just consider ourselves a rock band. Every band is different and we play rock our way. I guess it kind of dwells into heavy metal territory from time to time but I wouldn't go into a room full of 'metalheads' and say, 'Hey, this is my Priestess record, we're a heavy metal band!'"

— Mikey Heppner, 2007

Priestess were frequently cited as a classic rock revivalist act, using such rock 'n' roll staples as guitar solos, and were often compared to legendary acts such as Black Sabbath, AC/DC, Led Zeppelin, and Deep Purple. Heppner denied that they were actively emulating the sound of the likes of such bands on purpose, arguing that they simply play what they want to play, and that such comparisons are only incidental.

The band have been variously labeled as hard rock, heavy metal, and even stoner rock, although the band did not try to define their style; Heppner once commented that "all labels beyond rock are useless to [him]," and also pointed out in 2005 that Cream were considered metal for their time, concluding that "in this ancient way, [Priestess are] metal." Other bands that influenced the group were also referred to as heavy metal in bygone decades. Watchorn only described the band as hard rock, and argues that calling their music "metal" only limits the band's creative freedom. Drummer Vince Nudo has said that since the songs are not written to be "heavy", he does not understand the direct metal association. The band opined that they are perhaps not "heavy" enough for heavy metal fans while they are too "heavy" for fans of softer rock, and also denied that the music scene of Montreal has in any way defined, shaped, or helped them find their sound; Heppner once said, "We might as well be from anywhere," and the band are close friends with fellow Montreal acts. The band's name itself has been part of the confusion; Heppner, speaking English during an interview with Canadian French-language newspaper La Presse, stated that Priestess was "just this heavy name" and the reporter wrote, "parce que ça sonne metal" (which translates to "because it sounds metal").

Hello Master was intentionally written to be simple in terms of the music, while Prior to the Fire was meant to be somewhat more complex on purpose without being too different from Hello Master. The stylistic shift was attributed to the band's desire to create something more challenging for themselves. Their debut album also features twin harmonized guitar solos, something long considered to have gone out of style in rock music. Heppner largely wrote the first album himself and had the others' help in arranging it, but the second one featured much more writing input from his bandmates.

=== Influences ===
The group admired classic rock mainstays such as the Beatles, the Rolling Stones, Black Sabbath, Led Zeppelin, and AC/DC. Nirvana was an early inspiration for Heppner, whose earliest repertoire was entirely made of Nirvana songs. Watchorn said the Melvins were his favorite band, and he also enjoyed folk and country music.

Heppner preferred the Beatles, while Watchorn has stated that he likes the Stones better. Bassist Mike Dyball was known to enjoy Bruce Springsteen and the Cult, and Nudo admired John Bonham, David Bowie, and Thin Lizzy. Heppner also cited Dinosaur Jr., with whom the group toured in 2006, as "a band that [they] have worshipped since [they] were teenagers," along with thrash metal group Metallica as a personal favorite.

Groups who championed the progressive rock movement of the 1970s have also impacted the group; in addition to the Beatles, Heppner cited Pink Floyd, Yes, Jethro Tull, Genesis, King Crimson, and Frank Zappa as his favorite inspirations, the latter being his favorite artist in general. On the band's second studio album, Prior to the Fire, they drew from more progressive rock influences, with more complex music and more obscure lyrical themes; Heppner, who had listened to these artists throughout his youth (while his bandmates did not), had been writing new material with them as his inspiration, but was embarrassed about the new musical direction at first, as he was not sure how his bandmates would react. Consequently, he did not show them the material he was writing for a time, and when he did, their reaction was the opposite of what he was expecting.

=== Songwriting and lyrics ===
Lyrical themes range from typical rock 'n' roll themes to film and television characters. Favorite movies inspired certain lyrics from Hello Master, and were also the subject of many songs on Prior to the Fire, along with anime; for example, "Murphy's Law" was a tribute of Heppner's to RoboCop, his favorite film, while "Sideways Attack" was inspired by Lone Wolf and Cub. Because of his preferred lyrical focus, Heppner does not claim to be an "amazing" lyricist.

Hello Master contains grim lyrics that refer to death and murder; in particular, "Lay Down" is about a man who murders his wife, while "Two Kids" relates the discovery and investigation of the dead bodies of two children. Prior to the Fire continued that lyrical tradition with "Lady Killer", in which someone promises to avenge the murder of a loved one.

Regarding the apparent theme of violence in the band's work, Heppner argued that such a theme is a logical side effect of writing heavier material, noting that he does not write violent lyrics for the sake of writing violent lyrics.

== Members ==
- Mikey Heppner – lead vocals, lead guitar (2002–2012)
- Dan Watchorn – rhythm guitar, backing vocals (2002–2012)
- Mike Dyball – bass guitar (2002–2012)
- Vince Nudo – drums, percussion, backing vocals (2003–2012)

== Discography ==
=== Albums ===
| Album | Details |
|---|---|
| Hello Master | Released: October 18, 2005; Label: Indica; Formats: CD, music download |
| Prior to the Fire | Released: October 20, 2009; Label: Indica; Formats: CD, music download |

=== Singles ===
- "Talk to Her" (2006)
- "I Am the Night, Colour Me Black" (2007)
- "Lady Killer" (2010)

== See also ==
- Canadian rock
- Music of Canada
