= Logic Will Break Your Heart =

Studio album by The Stills
- Released: October 21, 2003
- Recorded: 2003
- Studio: The Boiler-Room (Brooklyn) and Melody Lane (New York City)
- Genre: Indie rock, post-punk revival
- Length: 50:07
- Label: Vice
- Producer: Gus Van Go

The Stills chronology
Rememberese (2003)	Logic Will Break Your Heart (2003)	Without Feathers (2006)

Professional ratings
Aggregate scores
Source	Rating
Metacritic	79/100
Review scores
Source	Rating
AllMusic	4/5 stars
Blender	4/5 stars
Pitchfork	5.1/10
Rolling Stone	4/5 stars

Logic Will Break Your Heart is the debut album by the Montreal-based indie rock band the Stills. The album was released in North America on October 21, 2003, and in the UK on February 23, 2004. It included the singles "Lola Stars and Stripes", "Changes Are No Good" and "Still in Love Song".

The album elicited comparisons to Interpol and Echo & the Bunnymen, with AllMusic citing its "dark, art-pop design", and Pitchfork noting its "retro arrangements, percussive guitar work, and 'big' cavernous production".

== Track listing ==
All songs written by The Stills.

1. "Lola Stars and Stripes" – 3:50
2. "Gender Bombs" – 4:00
3. "Changes Are No Good" – 3:42
4. "Love and Death" – 4:16
5. "Of Montreal" – 4:28
6. "Ready for It" – 5:20
7. "Let's Roll" – 4:24
8. "Allison Krausse" – 3:06
9. "Animals and Insects" – 3:40
10. "Still in Love Song" – 3:41
11. "Fevered" – 4:03
12. "Yesterday Never Tomorrows" – 5:21

== Singles ==
- "Lola Stars and Stripes" (February 16, 2004)
  - CD1:
    1. "Lola Stars and Stripes"
    2. "Still in Love Song (12" Extended Remix)"
    3. "Lola Stars and Stripes (4-Track Demo)"
    4. "Lola Stars and Stripes (Enhanced Video)
  - CD2:
    1. "Lola Stars and Stripes"
    2. "At War (4-Track Demo)"
  - 7" vinyl:
    1. "Lola Stars and Stripes"
    2. "Lola Stars and Stripes (4-Track Demo)"
- "Changes Are No Good" (April 19, 2004)
  - CD1:
    1. "Changes Are No Good"
    2. "Changes Are No Good (Grand National Remix)"
    3. "Changes Are No Good (4-Track Demo)"
    4. "Lola Stars and Stripes"
    5. "Changes Are No Good" (Enhanced Video)
  - CD2:
    1. "Changes Are No Good"
    2. "Let's Roll (Band Demo)"
  - 7" vinyl:
    1. "Changes Are No Good"
    2. "Changes Are No Good (4-Track Demo)"
- "Still in Love Song" (August 9, 2004)
  - CD1:
    1. "Still in Love Song"
    2. "Yesterday Never Tomorrows (Live Acoustic)"
  - CD2:
    1. "Still in Love Song"
    2. "Lola Stars and Stripes (Live Acoustic)"
    3. "Love and Death (Live at The Troubadour)"
    4. "Still in Love Song (Live Acoustic)"
    5. "Still in Love Song" (Enhanced Video)
  - 7" vinyl:
    1. "Still in Love Song"
    2. "Still in Love Song (12" Extended Remix)"

== Personnel ==
The Stills

- Tim Fletcher - vocals, guitar
- Dave Hamelin - drums, keyboards, guitar, vocals
- Greg Paquet - lead guitar
- Oliver Crowe - bass
  - Liam O'Neil - keyboards on tracks 1, 2, 3, 6 and 11
  - Werner F. - baritone guitar on track 7; additional guitar on track 12; drum programming on track 9

Additional personnel

- Produced by Gus Van Go.
- Recorded by Werner F. at The Boiler-Room, Brooklyn, NY.
  - except track 10, recorded by Jay Braun at Melody Lane, NYC.
- Mixed by Gus Van Go and Werner F.
- Mastered by Emily Lazar at The Lodge, NYC.
- Managed by Adam "Bix" Berger.
- Art direction and design by Surface to Air.
- Cover photographs by Santiago Marotto.
- Interior portraits by Johnny Giunta.
- Illustrations by Gordon Hull.
