= Star of All Planets =

Single by Ryan Malcolm

from the album Home
- Released: 2003
- Genre: Pop
- Label: Bmg Int

Ryan Malcolm singles chronology
"Something More" (2003)	"Star of All Planets" (2003)	"You made This Fool Become A Man" (2004)

"Star of All Planets" is the second single by Canadian Idol first season winner Ryan Malcolm from his album Home.
