= Prior to the Fire =

Studio album by Priestess
- Released: October 20, 2009
- Recorded: October–November 2008
- Genre: Hard rock
- Length: 46:40
- Label: Indica (Canada), Tee Pee (USA)
- Producer: David Schiffman

Priestess chronology
Hello Master (2005)	Prior to the Fire (2009)

Prior to the Fire is the second studio album by Canadian hard rock group Priestess. Recorded in Los Angeles with producer David Schiffman, the album was initially released on October 20, 2009, by Indica Records in Canada. By design, the album lacks the production values of the band's debut album, Hello Master, in order to achieve a more natural sound. As the band took more progressive rock influences and applied them to their songwriting, they changed their lyrical focus and wrote about themes considered to be more unusual for rock music, such as film and television characters, for this album.

The record is known for the difficulty Priestess encountered in trying to release it. The band's extensive touring schedule for their previous album Hello Master consumed much of the time they would have used to write new material, and after they began doing so, they had disputes with RCA Records, their international distributor at the time, as to whether the new songs were acceptable. After the completion of the recording sessions, which were themselves problematic, RCA ultimately refused to release the album, fearing it was not commercial enough, but allowed the group to release it on another label. Tee Pee Records signed the group thereafter and released the album internationally. Priestess were still signed to Indica Records, but only for Canadian distribution; the release on Indica was withheld until an international distributor was found.

Critical reaction to the album was mixed, but largely positive. The departure in style from Hello Master was frequently noted for better or for worse, and comparisons of the group to influential hard rock and heavy metal acts such as Thin Lizzy and Black Sabbath were once again made.

== Background ==
In 2005, Priestess released its debut album Hello Master, which spawned two minor hits: "Lay Down" became popular because it was included as a playable track in the best-selling video game Guitar Hero III: Legends of Rock, and "Talk to Her" peaked at #33 on the Hot Mainstream Rock Tracks chart in 2006. Even though the group have admitted that they were ultimately displeased with the sound of the record, which they described as "so tight and really produced", they remain proud of their Guitar Hero achievement. The band spent roughly two and a half years performing concerts on behalf of Hello Master, supporting such acts as Dinosaur Jr., the Sword, Mastodon and Megadeth. During that time they concentrated mostly on the existing material and had little chance to write anything new, and writing for the new album would not begin in earnest until the summer of 2007.

Lead singer and guitarist Mikey Heppner, who listened to progressive rock in his youth, wrote things that he initially withheld from the band, because he felt that his bandmates would not understand him - he described his work as being "way too proggy". Despite his initial doubt, they loved his work when he showed it to them. Thereafter, Heppner began describing the forthcoming record in progressive rock terms during interviews. He told the Whistler Question that it "is a little more musically complex; deeper into the sort of metal side where we started out from", but that "It still sounds like us". He also told Jam! that the new songs were "leaning toward progressive (rock) territory".

However, RCA Records, their former label who released Hello Master outside their native Canada in all other territories starting in 2006, became hopeful that the band's next record would have similar success. As a result, the label continually rejected the material represented by the demo recordings the group were sending in, believing that none of the songs could perform as commercially successful singles. RCA continually delayed the band from entering the studio in hopes that they could write such a song, but by the time the group had written 20 songs (including material that was eventually phased out of their concert setlist) the label still had no confidence in the new material. "We really were in an amazing place, writing, jamming four to five times a week and coming up with great stuff," recalled Heppner. "We felt at the peak of our creativity. [...] And they were like, 'Can you write more songs?' (We were, like), 'This is insane.'" The laborious work on Priestess' sophomore album and the record label issues throughout 2008 ultimately forced bassist Mike Dyball to quit his side project, atmospheric black metal band Vision Lunar. RCA would continue to differ with Priestess on the issue, even after the album was finished.

== Recording ==
Realizing that the arguments were only consuming time, RCA relented for the time being and allowed the band to make studio arrangements. In December 2007, the band made their first attempt at recording the album with producer Matt Bayles, who after only a few days was dismissed as he "wasn't really the right fit". In 2008, after the band spent the winter looking for another producer, their A&R representative at RCA Records tried to schedule sessions with Tool guitarist Adam Jones but was unsuccessful; as a result, the process did not begin in earnest for six more months. This also meant they could not plan a concert tour until they had the problems with their studio schedule resolved. Following several more attempts at securing a producer, Priestess finally got the recording sessions scheduled for October 2008 when David Schiffman signed on to the project after meeting with the group through their A&R representative; Schiffman, whose résumé included artists from Johnny Cash to System of a Down, had expressed interest in helming the album for the band if they were in need of his services. After pre-production in Montreal, Priestess went to Los Angeles to record the album.

Once the recording sessions got off the ground, Priestess encountered another problem – this time with the law. The band were working in a house in a neighborhood, and the close proximity to other houses meant that they had to keep the amount of noise generated to a minimum. They had been assured that the house had not previously been served with noise violations of any kind, but after they had finished recording drums and many of the guitar parts, they learned that they had the volume set too high when working on the bass guitar tracks; law enforcement came to the door and forced them to take their work elsewhere because they were shaking neighboring houses with the noise they were generating. The band did so with no objection, quickly moving their equipment to another studio, although they recalled the incident rather humorously later. Schiffman was able to arrange for the group to use another facility as early as the following day, and the band moved production to that new location the night of the incident. The sessions were completed in November 2008.

During the sessions, the band played a single "secret" show in Los Angeles where they showed fans everything being recorded for the album.

== Music and lyrics ==
The band were enthusiastic about working with David Schiffman. His approach was more minimalistic compared to that of Gus van Go (who produced Hello Master) and did not involve many of the studio techniques van Go employed. Heppner stated, "Everything was way simpler [than it had been for Hello Master]." He noted that Prior to the Fire more accurately reflected the band's live sound, whereas Hello Master was, as he put it, a "studio production". The recording was not specifically intended to emulate their live concert sound, but to sound more natural – "This is Priestess playing in a room," Heppner clarified, thus emphasizing that they wanted to simply record the band and nothing else. Schiffman gave the band a lot of creative freedom as well, not interfering with song arrangements and simply allowing the band to record as they desired, which led Heppner to enthusiastically state that he was "all about recording it and not fucking with it." Heppner noted that if Schiffman had any suggestions, he never forced them onto the group, which made them more willing to consider his suggestions. At least 14 of the 20 songs the band wrote were recorded at the sessions.

"Riffs, at this point, to not be all too typical, almost need to have a second hook to them. There's the base riff, and it needs something that shoots off from what it would normally be; there's the standard and you've got to throw it for a loop."

— Dan Watchorn on the use of riffs on the album

After Heppner introduced his bandmates to progressive rock, the band integrated minor influences from the genre in their songwriting and compositions, including touches of keyboards, while trying not to deviate too much from the sound of Hello Master. The change in style was largely adopted so they could challenge themselves musically, but not specifically to be heavier: "I don't think we go in wanting to write a heavier record," guitarist Dan Watchorn stated. "I don't think we have a preconceived notion of what we want, the riffs and melodies just kind of come. The fact that Hello Master was a bit more on the poppy side and Prior to the Fire has a bit more edge to it is just where we're at right now with music." Of the end result, drummer Vince Nudo said, "Our individual tastes came out more [on this record than they did on Hello Master]. [...] It's more organic. We're not holding back so much."

The writing process for this album was more communal compared to that for Hello Master; Heppner had written much of the band's debut album himself and his bandmates helped him in arranging the material, but the sophomore album featured more contributions from each band member. Nudo once again wrote and sang a song for the record, and although Watchorn did not write the lyrics to an entire song by himself for this album, he and Heppner collaborated on several of them, including "Lady Killer". Watchorn explained that the songs changed drastically between the time they were first written and when they got recorded, and that the songs "weren't complete until they actually made the record." He also said that the album's protracted production history enabled the group to experiment with the songs and repeatedly alter them to taste, thus ironically yielding a record that was considered better than if they had been able to simply record it and be done with it sooner.

Lyrically, the album focused on more unusual themes for rock music than the band had written for Hello Master as they instead wrote about personal interests. For his part, Heppner described the songs as being about "mega geek shit", and recalled some advice he had been given to simply write about things he liked, which became how most of the songs on the album were written. Heppner wrote "Murphy's Law" as an ode to his favorite film, RoboCop; he was inspired to write it when he was writing songs in his room and saw his poster for the movie on the wall. His lyrics to "It Baffles the Mind" recount a tournament in the manga/anime series Dragon Ball, while the seminal Lone Wolf and Cub inspired him to write "Sideways Attack". The influential serial drama Twin Peaks served as the basis for a song that he wrote that did not make it into the final track listing; outtakes from the album were set for separate release on 7" singles. Watchorn has noted that this album was not the first time the band had described their favorite films in songs; although he did not specify which ones, he did note that there were songs from Hello Master that pertained to films as well.

Other themes were more general. "Lady Killer" has been cited as having a considerable thrash metal influence, and its topic of revenge against a serial killer is comparable to songs such as Iron Maiden's "Murders in the Rue Morgue" and Judas Priest's "The Ripper". The song emerged when the band attempted to "write a theme song for Jack the Ripper," according to Heppner, and its distinctive intro was created by generating feedback on a 1976 Gibson SG run through a 1970s MXR rack flanger. "The Gem" portrays the apocalypse as being a good thing because it wipes humanity off the planet; whoever sets it in motion (Heppner explained as by "open[ing] Pandora's Box") is hailed as a hero for having done the right thing. "Communicating Via-Eyes" is "the werewolf song", as Heppner put it; he wrote much of that song while on tour with Megadeth in the UK. He later stated a song loosely inspired by An American Werewolf in London was written for the album, but it is not clear whether he was referring to a song already on the album or an outtake from it.

== Title and artwork ==
The Cincinnati CityBeat reported that the album had been titled Life Giver, but Heppner was inspired to use the phrase Prior to the Fire while at a hotel on tour. Flipping through the channels on the hotel television in search of shows like CSI, he was just in time to witness a segment on A&E where a detective commented on a woman's death in a house fire. He said something to the effect of, "The amount of carbon monoxide in the victim's lungs proves that she had died prior to the fire," and Heppner liked the way the last words sounded.

The artwork was designed by a friend named Mike Yardley in response to a mass e-mail Hepper sent to all the artists he knew. The band do not ascribe any particular meaning to it; Heppner commented that the artwork, combined with the title, could be "a pre-creation thing" or even "a Billy Joel reference." In any case, the meaning of the artwork and title has been left open to interpretation, and the artwork was chosen specifically because it did not conform to an existing standard.

== Continuing dispute with RCA ==
Much as the label had argued with the band over the quality of the songs before production, RCA continued to debate the issue with Priestess after the album sessions were finished in the fall of 2008. Despite the confidence the band themselves had in the strength of the album's material, RCA still did not share that sentiment and refused to release the album, as they felt it still lacked a potential single. Reflecting on the situation, Heppner remarked, "You can't force write a single, it's impossible to do that. At least it's impossible for us. We're not Tin Pan Alley songwriters; we're a rock band."

"We just thought it was insane that the label wasn't understanding it. I think they were hoping we'd make the transition into a Foo Fighters–type band or something."

— Mikey Heppner, November 2009

RCA subsequently released the group from their contract. Despite having funded the album's production, RCA gave the band the opportunity to find another label to release the finished product instead, thus losing any money the company had invested in it. The group had hoped to release the album in March 2009, but RCA's reluctance caused Priestess to miss this anticipated timeframe completely. Indica Records has always been the band's label for material released in their native Canada, but the album was withheld from release altogether until the band could find a new label to replace RCA. By all accounts, the band lost a year trying to get Prior to the Fire released.

Because of RCA's leniency in the end, the band's departure was peaceful despite complications, and they still hold respect for RCA for what the label allowed them to do. Heppner credits the label for allowing the record that RCA funded to go to some other company who would want it instead, while Watchorn acknowledges that Great Recession would have mandated that record labels only keep "the things that are going to sell" on their rosters. Heppner noted that labels usually shelve albums permanently if they are deemed unfit for commercial sale rather than give them to the artists who recorded them, and that the band were "really, really lucky" in comparison. Priestess found and signed with New York City independent record label Tee Pee Records to replace RCA in late 2009; Tee Pee Records had offered to sign the group years earlier, but the band chose RCA over Tee Pee. They enjoy being signed to Tee Pee Records rather than RCA, where they feel more "at home". The band have stated that they feel less pressure to succeed on Tee Pee Records, and they do not feel any less important to the label compared to its higher-profile artists, such as American Idol contestants. "Tee Pee is the perfect label for us right now, because they totally understand what we want to do," Heppner stated. "I am alas [sic] stoked to be labelmates with so many wicked bands." He additionally noted that the only advantage the band had when signed to RCA was more money, and that having a different kind of music meant that Priestess were not as lucrative as a band such as the Foo Fighters, who were more heavily promoted.

== Release and reception ==
Professional ratings
Aggregate scores
Source	Rating
Metacritic	68/100
Review scores
Source	Rating
AllMusic	4/5 stars
Pitchfork Media	5.9/10
Artrocker	4/5 stars
Spin	8 of 10
The Boston Phoenix	1.5/4 stars
PopMatters	5/10 stars
Rock Sound	9/10
The PRP	4/5 stars
Prefix	5.0/10
Phoenix New Times	B

Prior to the Fire was released on October 20, 2009, in Canada, and on February 2, 2010 (the soonest possible date Tee Pee Records could give the band) in the United States. Priestess chose for an earlier release in Canada so that they could begin touring in support of the record at last. All CD pressings of the album contain 11 tracks, but with the deluxe edition from Tee Pee Records comes a code to obtain a 13-track edition from the Internet. It contains the original 11 tracks, plus two bonus tracks. (As the band are signed only to Indica Records in Canada, all deluxe editions from Tee Pee Records are only released outside of Canada.) Two deluxe editions were released by Tee Pee Records: both came with the code for the Internet download, and one came with an exclusive T-shirt as well.

Critical opinions of the album have been mixed, but largely positive. Metacritic gave the album a rating of 68 out of 100, based on 12 reviews.

AllMusic's Phil Freeman said that the album, which he gave 4 out of 5 stars, was well worth the wait after the amount of time it took to get released, and that the stylistic variety of material, combined with the cover art (which bore a striking resemblance to that of The Resistance, also released that year), could make Priestess "retro hard rock's answer to Muse". Rock Sound made a favorable comparison to Thin Lizzy for the track "Lunar", and to Baroness for "The Gem", giving the album a score of 9 out of 10. The PRP described the album as "heavier" than Hello Master, with its songs having "an alarming amount of depth", but referred to the track "Murphy's Law" as "questionable" in an otherwise favorable review which gave the album 4 out of 5 stars. Artrocker's Stuart Gadd also gave the album 4 out of 5 stars, as he enjoyed the stylistic reminders of Iron Maiden and other classic metal he heard on the album, and went as far as to say that despite being released in early 2010 it was already the best metal record of the year. David Marchese, writing for Spin, also praised the album with a score of 8 out of 10, even saying that "Someone should be fired for the delay [between Hello Master and Prior to the Fire], because this baby burns".

By contrast, Pitchfork Media's Tom Breihan offered a mixed opinion of 5.9 out of 10, stating that on its own the album is good, but it pales in comparison to an album like High on Fire's Snakes for the Divine. PopMatters scored the record 5 out of 10 stars and wondered if RCA's instincts were right in regards to the album's lack of "catchier" material, as Adrien Begrand said that Heppner's vocals were in general weaker on this album as compared to the band's previous record. Nonetheless, he did compliment Vince Nudo for his vocals on "Lunar", which he favorably compared to Black Sabbath, and also compared "Lady Killer" to Judas Priest. The Boston Phoenix reviewer Mikael Wood gave the album a star and a half out of four, and wrote that despite the cleverness behind the album's title, the songs within were empty, and while fans of the style would be comfortable with it, "Everybody else should seek out Hello Master."

Prefix writer Craig Hubert rated the album 5 out of 10, and said it had more "definable hooks" than most other metal albums, but that still made the record no better or more accessible. He did note that he looked forward to when the band reached their full potential, which he felt the new record's music indicated would be soon. Speaking from his perspective as an aged listener and someone who is not a fan of modern rock music, Jay Bennett of the Phoenix New Times gave the album a grade of B. He described the album as "a pleasant surprise", saying that he was not a fan of metal from recent years but that the album has "a lot more in common with the late-'70s and early-'80s-era Judas Priest and Iron Maiden", which he liked.

After the album's release in Canada, the band embarked on a tour in that country with Early Man and Trigger Effect in November 2009. February 2010 saw them return to the UK and Europe with Bigelf, and the group spent that spring supporting High on Fire in concert in the US. July saw them in Canada once more touring with High on Fire, and that November they played concerts as the headliner supported by new labelmates Naam in the US.

The band made a music video for "Lady Killer"; it was shot in the band's hometown of Montreal and directed by David Valiquette. Released on February 4, 2010, via Pitchfork Media, the video made extensive use of fur and taxidermy, which were noted by ChartAttack as qualities PETA would not approve of: "I can hear Ingrid Newkirk screaming right now." The video features the band members performing quite prominently in spite of Heppner's previous assertion that no music video made for the album would feature the band members performing, citing his embarrassment from the production process of the band's previous music videos. "Lady Killer" was listed by Noisecreep as the tenth best metal song of 2010.

== Track listing ==
No.	Title	Length
1.	"Lady Killer"	4:06
2.	"Raccoon Eyes"	2:40
3.	"The Firebird"	4:00
4.	"Murphy's Law"	2:55
5.	"The Gem"	7:59
6.	"Communicating Via-Eyes"	4:26
7.	"Lunar"	2:54
8.	"It Baffles the Mind"	5:34
9.	"Sideways Attack"	3:15
10.	"We Ride Tonight"	4:04
11.	"Trapped in Space & Time"	4:47
Total length:		46:40

Tee Pee Records vinyl bonus tracks
No.	Title	Length
12.	"Castle Dracula"	4:28
13.	"Dweller"	3:56

== Personnel ==
=== Priestess ===
- Mikey Heppner – lead guitar, lead vocals
- Dan Watchorn – rhythm guitar, backing vocals
- Mike Dyball – bass guitar
- Vince Nudo – drums, backing vocals, lead vocals on "Lunar"

=== Additional personnel ===
Credits taken from AllMusic.

- David Schiffman – producer, engineer
- Gordon Ball – photography
- Mike Yardley – illustrations, design
- Jon Cranfeld & Brian Kehew – second engineers
- Adrian Popovich – mixing
- Ryan Morey – audio mastering
- Ace – guitar technician
- Lee Smith – drum technician
