= Da Gryptions =

Canadian hip hop band

- Origin: Montreal, Quebec, Canada
- Genres: Hip hop
- Years active: 2009–present
- Members: Patrick Guay; Evan Cranley; Trevor Barnes; Stephen Ramsay
- Website: Da Gryptions on Myspace

Da Gryptions is a Canadian hip hop band from Montreal, formed in 2009. The band consists of Future Shark (a.k.a. Trevor Barnes) (vocals), Dark Science (a.k.a. Patrick Guay) (vocals), Apsobibi (a.k.a. Evan Cranley of Stars) (R&B vocals), and Ripples (a.k.a. Stephen Ramsay of Young Galaxy (production and hype-man), and features the studio skills of Weirdo Beardo (Liam O'Neil, formerly a member of The Stills).

== History ==
The group had the idea to form the group while car pooling to ball hockey. While initially it was just going to be a faux hip-hop act, they started doing DJ sets around Montreal, eventually putting together a live show.

After doing a few shows "freestyling" someone had videotaped one of these shows, with Apsobibi doing a chorus about Montreal's public bike system, BIXI Montréal. A producer at CJAD in Montreal came across this video and asked if the band could do a studio version that they could play on the air. After shooting a video for the track, it went viral hitting 7,000 plays in two days and 38,000 to date. The song was seen as a local hit and was recognized nationally. The band played the Osheaga Festival that summer and were played on CBC Radio and MusiquePlus as well. It was touted as Montreal's "Song of the summer" as well.

"The Bixi Anthem" was named the number 4 song of the year by the Montreal Gazette in their year-end wrapup.

The band have made mention of recording new Montreal themed songs. "We have a song called 'J'imagine,' about the golden era, if you will, of Montreal, from '67 to '76." Future Shark said to the Montreal Mirror "You know, Nadja Comaneci scoring seven perfect 10s, the metro system, the Expos."

The group made "It's BBQ Time" its next single, releasing it just in time for Saint-Jean-Baptiste on June 24, 2011.

In June 2012, there was mention of J'Imagine possibly being released. On July 28 the video, filmed once again by Who is KK Downey? director Darren Curtis, was uploaded to YouTube, in time for the start of the 2012 Summer Olympics. It was praised for its use of "Montrealisims". According to the Montreal Gazette, "references include the Big O, Youppi, Jean Leloup, Mitsou, Jacques Villeneuve, Nick Auf der Maur, Mordecai Richler, the Expos, July 1, the Oka Crisis, the Ice Storm, the Referendum, poutine, balconville, 5-à-7s, Drinking In L.A., Expo 67, and the Alouettes. As usual, the boys have a mad-styling video to go with the dope jam".

Because of Apsobibi's commitment to Stars the band will not be able to tour this release.

== Members ==
- Dark Science – Vocals
- Future Shark – Vocals
- Apsobibi - R&B Vocals
- Ripples - Production & Hype-Man

== Discography ==
=== Singles ===
- "The Bixi Anthem" (April 30, 2010)
- "It's BBQ Time" (June 24, 2011)
- "J'Imagine" (July 28, 2012)

=== Music videos ===
- "The Bixi Anthem" (June 8, 2010)
  - Directed by Darren Curtis
- "It's BBQ Time" (June 24, 2011)
  - Directed by Darren Curtis
- "J'Imagine" (July 28, 2012)
  - Directed by Darren Curtis, produced by Jared Curtis

== See also ==
- Evan Cranley
- Young Galaxy
