= Fast Romantics =

Canadian rock band

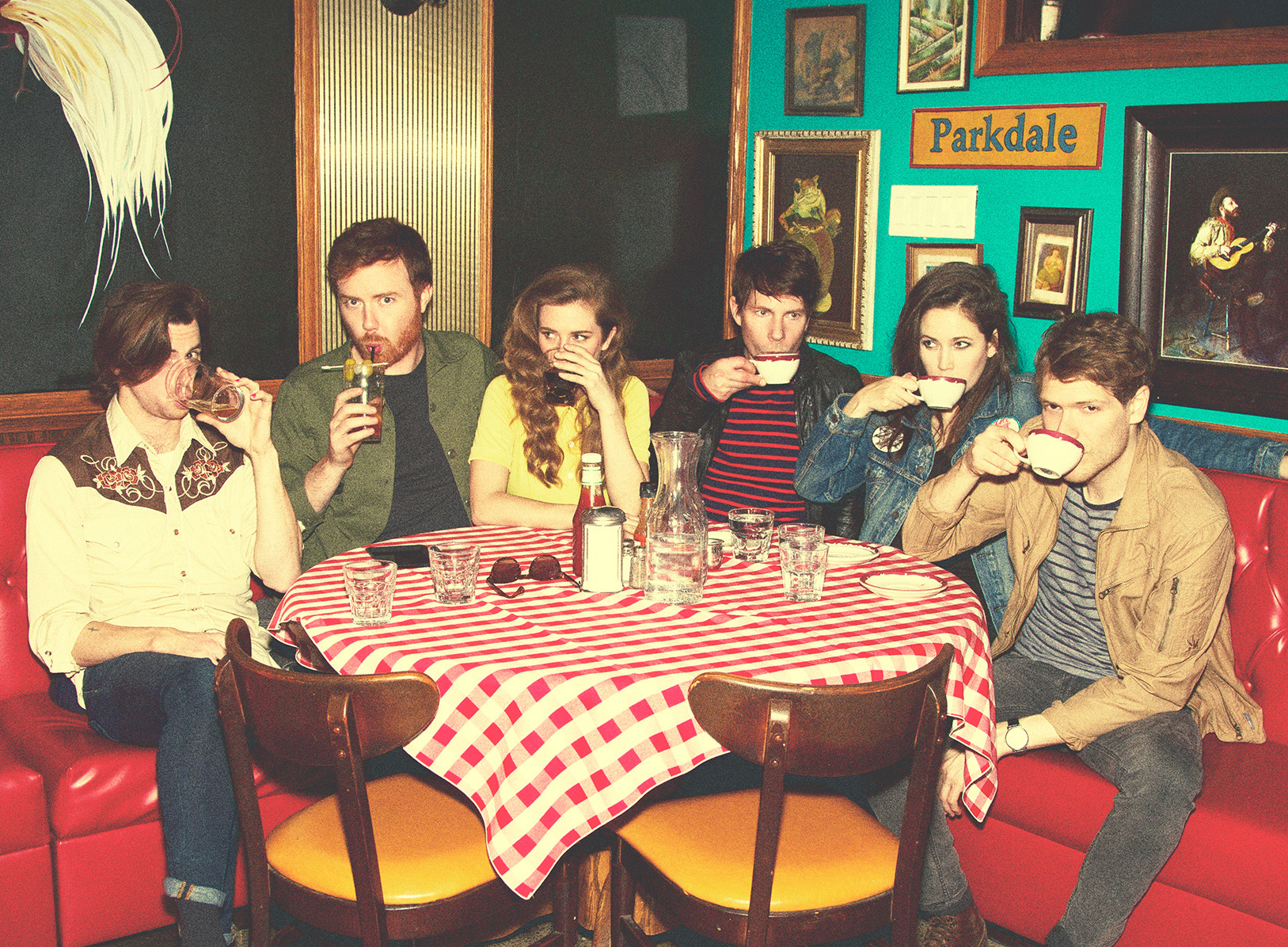
- Fast Romantics Press Photo, 2017. Photographer: Jen Squires.

Background information
- Origin: Calgary, Alberta, Canada
- Genres: Indie rock Indie pop
- Years active: 2008–present
- Members: Matthew Angus; Kirty; Jeffrey Lewis; Kevin Black; Nick McKinlay; Lisa Lorenz
- Past members: Matthew Kliewer; Alan Reain; Laurna Germscheid; Shane O'Keeffe; Lauren Heron; John de Jesus
- Website: fastromantics.com

Fast Romantics is a Canadian indie rock band based in Toronto, Ontario and originally formed in Calgary, Alberta.

== Early beginnings ==
Fast Romantics formed in 2009 by former members of long-running Calgary band The Mood, initially retaining three of its original members: Matthew Angus, Matthew Kliewer, and Jeffrey Lewis. Upon reforming, the band added Alan Reain on drums and began doing a number of local shows.

The band added and lost many members in the years that followed, releasing two independent records, touring heavily, and eventually reforming in Toronto in 2014.

The Fast Romantics debut, a self-titled LP, was a self-recorded effort released in 2008, and later mixed in Vancouver by Mike Fraser, who has also mixed albums by acts such as Franz Ferdinand, Elvis Costello, and Metallica. In 2008, Fast Romantics was one of the winners of the Xposure Contest hosted by Calgary alternative rock station X92.9/CFEX-FM, and three songs appeared on the resultant compilation CD. The band toured Canada twice in support of that album, and played events such as Virgin Festival.

In September 2009, the band was selected by Spin Magazine and competition co-creator John Varvatos as one of three global finalists in the magazine's "Free the Noise" competition. Taking a detour from their national Canadian tour, the band was flown to New York City to perform at the music club CBGB (now occupied by Varvatos). Guitarist Matthew Kliewer stated: "There were apparently 950 people there. I heard that Dennis Quaid was there, but I couldn't see if he was jumping up and down, checking his watch, or trying to save the planet."

On July 6, 2010, the band independently released the EP Kidcutter. The album was produced by Howard Redekopp, who has also produced Tegan and Sara, The New Pornographers, and Mother Mother. The EP was once again mixed by Mike Fraser.

Songs from the album have appeared on numerous television shows including Shameless, Breaking In, Vampire Diaries, Pretty Little Liars, and One Tree Hill. "Cool Kids" was also featured in the 2013 film As Cool as I Am.

Multiple lineup changers rocked the band during this early phase, and in 2013 the band eventually added two Australian members, Shane O'Keefe and Lauren Heron, at the same time realizing their next full-length album, Afterlife Blues. Again produced by Howard Redekopp, the album's first single was "Funeral Song", which eventually charted on national alternative rock radio. The band toured in Spring 2014 with openers Dear Rouge in support of the album.

In 2014, the band underwent another dramatic loss in members, reduced to its two founding members, primary songwriter Matthew Angus, and original bass player Jeffrey Lewis.

== Rebuilding and recent history ==
Deciding to rebuild the band from scratch with Lewis, Angus added four new members in 2014, beginning with respected Toronto singer/songwriter Kirty as a multi-instrumentalist and singer. The two developed a chemistry quickly and as new songs began to form, Kevin Black (formerly of Toronto-based band Hands & Teeth) was added on guitars and vocals, Nick McKinlay was added on drums, and eventually in 2015, Lisa Lorenz was added on keyboards.

Fast Romantics won Pop Group of the Year at the Sirius XM Indies in May 2014 for "Funeral Song", after which point, Angus began work on writing new material, saying in 2015: "We've been writing songs like 'Julia' that are super upbeat and poppy, and then there's these other songs that are dark and vibe-y and really rhythmic. And we're just sort of experimenting with everything. We'll probably come out with dozens and dozens of songs, so until it gets to a point where it's like, yeah, we've got an album we want to put forward and this is our sound for the next few years, we're just going to keep doing that."

The first single released by this new version of Fast Romantics was "Julia" in March, 2015. The song reached the Top 5 on CBC Radio 2 in Canada, and found itself onto radio in America as well. They released a music video featuring Fred Astaire dancing with members of the band, which was eventually short-listed for the Prism Prize, a national prize for Music Videos in Canada.

In June 2016, Fast Romantics won the 2016 SOCAN Songwriting Prize for the song "Julia", which was voted the best song by emerging artists over the past year. The rest of 2016 saw the band touring Canada and the United States while also finalizing work on their next LP with producers Gus Van Go and Werner F, who also produced "Julia".

In January 2017, the band released the first official single from their as-yet untitled new album, a political song called "Why We Fight." Released on the same day as the inauguration of Donald Trump, the video featured clips of American pop culture and protest movements, along with footage Angus found of an actor portraying Abraham Lincoln in a 1956 Greyhound-sponsored propaganda video, who was made to lip sync the lyrics of the song.

That same month, the band recorded a three-song performance of new material for alternative rock radio station Indie 88, stating in an interview portion that this was the band's true "first record" and that everything that came before was "just play-dough."

Shortly after the appearance, in February 2017, the band officially announced that they had signed to Light Organ Records and would be releasing their long-awaited LP on April 28, 2017, titled American Love. The press release described songs that were originally intended as love songs, but eventually became infused with the political uncertainty and social unrest occurring during the making of the album, a reference to the rise of Donald Trump throughout the 2016 election campaign in the USA. Frontman and lyricist Matthew Angus was quoted as saying: "I was falling pretty hard in love when we started the record. But the songs ended up being paintings of what it felt like to fall in love while the rest of the world went mad. The American election went bizarre and took over the Canadian one, everybody's obsession with social media hit some kind of peak, and suddenly everyone — everywhere — was talking about America. Smartphones were going off like bombs everywhere I went. It started seeping into the songwriting, and now I'm not even sure how to describe it. Is it a collection of love songs about politics or is it a collection of political songs about love?"

Shortly after announcing a release date and record label for American Love, the band went on whirlwind tour as the opening act for Said the Whale, playing 15 shows in 19 days. That was followed by an American tour in support of Air Traffic Controller.

In 2020, Fast Romantics released the album Pick It Up. On August 20, 2020, Fast Romantics gathered a small group of people at The Dakota Tavern in Toronto, and performed a full Pick It Up concert. In July 2021, the filmed concert was posted on YouTube.

== Discography ==
=== Albums ===
- The Fast Romantics (2009)
- Afterlife Blues (2013)
- American Love (2017)
- Pick It Up (2020)
- Happiness + Euphoria (2023)

=== EPs ===
- Kidcutter (2010)

== See also ==
- Music of Canada
- Canadian rock
- List of bands from Canada
