= Xavier Caféïne =

Xavier Cafeine Xavier Caféine
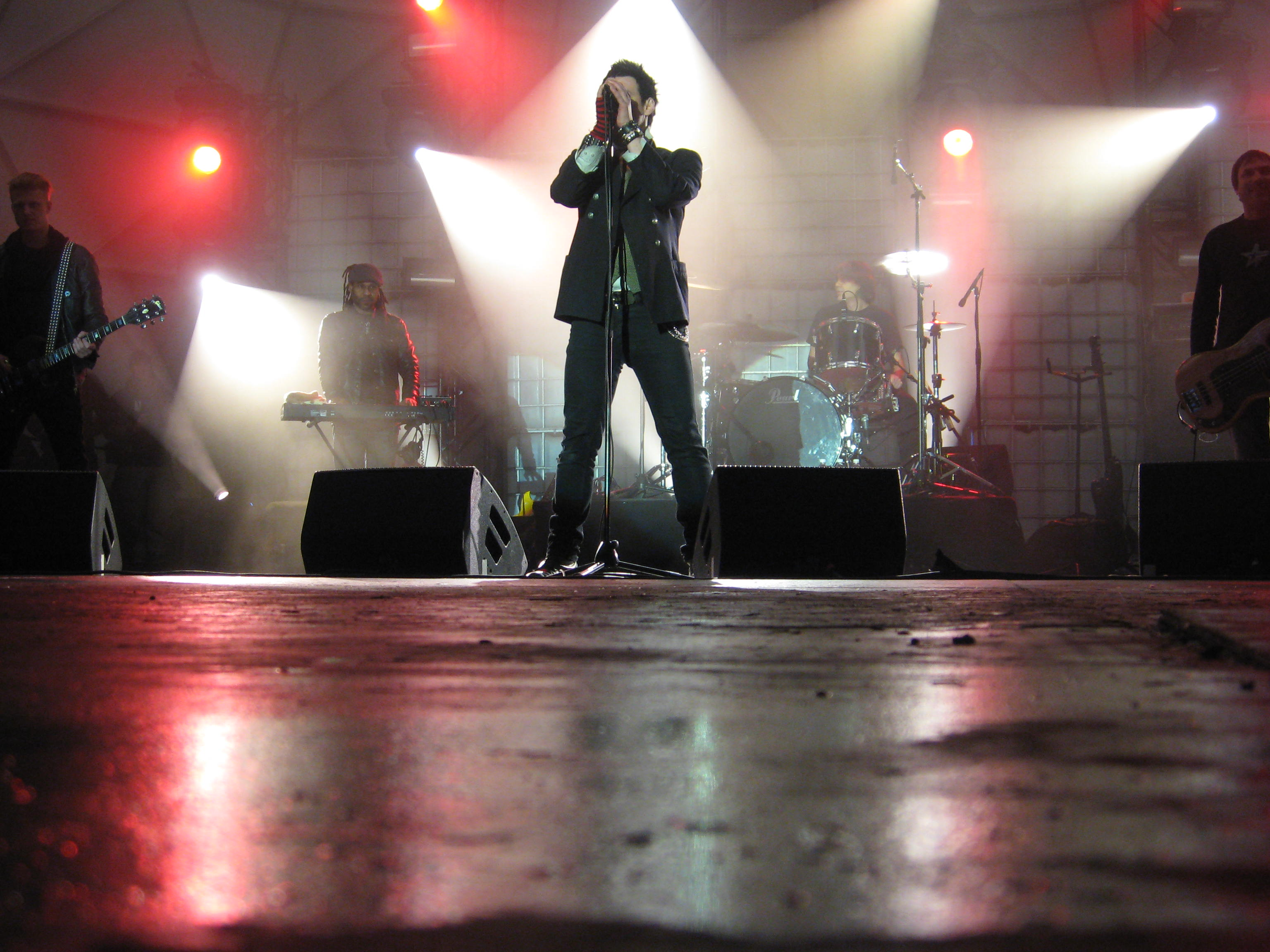

Background information
- Born: Xavier Plante
- Genres: Rock
- Occupations: Singer, musician
- Member of: Cafeine

Xavier Caféine is a French Canadian rock vocalist, multi instrumentalist, composer and producer from the province of Quebec. He is the primary songwriter and lead singer of his band Cafeine and has also released music under alternate spellings; Caféine, Xavier Caféïne, or Caféïne. Xavier received formal Jazz-Pop bass training at the Cégep Marie-Victorin school in Montreal. His first release was the indie-punk album Mal éduqué mon amour in 1998 sung entirely in French. The follow-up album Pornstar was released in 2000, leaning toward a more glam rock sound, with English lyrics.

In August 2006, he released Gisèle on Indica Records as a solo project. Once again Xavier wrote the music, sang and performed most of the instruments on his album. Additional drums were recorded by his friend Michel Langevin of Voivod. Gisèle considered a classic French-language punk rock album, earning two ADISQ 2007 nominations for "Best Rock Album of the Year" and "Best Male Artist", and winning the GAMIQ 2007 award for "Best Rock Album". The Society of Composers, Authors and Music Publishers of Canada awarded him the "2008 Discovery of the Year Song" award for "La fin du monde".

Cafeine's most recent album New Love was released again on Indica Records in 2013. The album was produced by Gus Van Go, giving the sound a crisper, more modern electro-punk-pop-rock sound. Singles "New Love", "Electric" and "L'ettre D'Amour" each reached the top 15 French-Canadian Commercial Alternative Radio BDS charts. New Love was primarily recorded in English with alternate French language versions for "Electric" and "L'ettre D'Amour". On February 17, 2015, New Love was digitally released in the US, marking the first time Cafeine's music received domestic distribution in a territory outside of Canada. The USA album cover art was changed from a photo of Cafeine to a blown out photo of a headless angel. A cover version of The Gun Club's song Sex Beat was included as a bonus track.

As a live performer, Cafeine is known for his high-octane-punk intensity. Le Journal de Québec quoted "he is still a beast on stage" referencing Toronto's alternative weekly NOW Magazine who declared "Cafeine is amazing, what a beast on stage". Established as a beloved personality, Cafeine regularly makes live appearances on French-Canadian music television such as Radio-Canada Television's show Stereopop or MusiquePlus specials such as Pop de jam.

In 2007, Belgian singer Plastic Bertrand contacted him to collaborate on the writing and composing of his new album "Dandy Bandit". Together they wrote seven songs. The two remain good friends, periodically performing together live as recently as June 24, 2015 in Montreal for the annual St. Jean Baptiste holiday. The free outdoor concert was attended by over 15,000 people in the streets of the Villeray area of Montreal and presented by La fete national dans Villeray 2015.

Other producer & songwriting collaborations include two albums for French-Canadian punk band Gazoline, "Futurbabymama" (2012) and their self-titled album Gazoline (2014).

== Discography ==
- 1998: Mal éduqué mon amour
- 2000: Pornstar
- 2004: Poxy
- 2006: Gisèle
- 2009: Bushido
- 2013: New Love
