= Wildlife (band) =

Canadian indie rock band

- Origin: Toronto, Ontario, Canada
- Genres: Indie Rock
- Years active: 2005–present
- Label: Wax Records
- Members: Dean Povinsky (Vocals); Derek Bosomworth (Bass); Dwayne Christie (Drums); Nick Greaves (Guitar); Chris Dawe (Keys)
- Past members: Julia Mensink; Graham Plant; Tim Daugulis
- Website: wildlifemusic.ca,

Wildlife are a Canadian indie rock band formed in 2005. The band is currently based in Toronto. The band's debut LP Strike Hard, Young Diamond was favourably received by both Exclaim! and Chart.

== History ==
=== Formation ===
Band members Dean Povinsky, Graham Plant, and Dwayne Christie are originally from Oshawa, Ontario. Wildlife began as an entity in 2005, when singer/guitarist Povinsky and guitarist Darryl Smith left Queen's University in Kingston, Ontario, and moved to Glasgow to form and play in a band. The group, also comprising Scottish drummer Peter Kelly and Canadian Billy Holmes, spent time travelling, writing songs, recording and playing small venues around Glasgow. The dark days, rain, and a general homesickness led the members to abandon the project and return to Canada.

Povinsky moved to Toronto with the intention of continuing Wildlife with childhood friend Graham Plant on guitar, drummer Dwayne Christie and Julia Mensink playing synthesizer. The group was rounded out when bassist Derek Bosomworth was procured via a Craigslist advertisement. The band is currently based in Toronto.

=== EP ===
The group independently released a self-titled EP in November 2008. Copies were sold at shows and on tours of Ontario and eastern Canada. The recording is currently out of print.

=== Strike Hard, Young Diamond ===
Wildlife released Strike Hard, Young Diamond on 16 November 2010 on the Toronto-based independent label Easy Tiger Music. Recorded and mixed in Hamilton, Ontario, their full-length debut was reviewed positively on the Baeble Music website. Critic Jessica Lewis of Exclaim! wrote, "The five songs are bold, full of angst and to the point, but they're also filled with youthful exuberance and affirming righteousness that will be good for a simple pick-me-up." In a favourable review, critic Scott Bryson of Chart suggested that the band's style was like a mix of fellow Canadians Wolf Parade and Born Ruffians.

Wildlife's song "Sea Dreamer" debuted on CBC Radio 3's top 30 charts at No. 28 and rose to No. 4.

Wildlife played the Canadian Music Week festival in 2011.

In an early leak of the Arcade Fire album The Suburbs, some tracks by Wildlife were released along with the leak, replacing "Rococo" by Arcade fire with "Sea Dreamer", among other replacements.

Band members cite their musical influences as including Bruce Springsteen, David Bowie, and The Clash.

=== On the Heart ===
Wildlife released On the Heart in March 2013 through Wax Records. This album gave the band their first top 10 radio hit with the single "Lightning Tent".

=== Age of Everything ===
Wildlife released a single called "Dead Century" in May 2016. The song was premiered live at Lee's Palace during Canadian Music Week 2016.

The album also saw a member change with the addition of Chris Dawe replacing Tim Daugulis, and Nick Greaves (The Most Serene Republic) replacing Graham Plant on Lead Guitar.

=== Take the Light with You ===
The band was most recently in the studio working with producer Dave Schiffman (PUP, The Mars Volta, System of a Down). The album was released in October 2019.

The band has also signed with Toronto-based record label Culvert Music.

== Band members ==
- Dean Povinsky – lead vocals, guitar (2005–present)
- Derek Bosomworth – bass guitar, vocals (2006–present)
- Dwayne Christie – drums (2006–present)
- Chris Dawe – keyboard, synth, keyboard, guitar, bass guitar (2012–present)
- Nick Greaves – Lead guitar (2014–present)

Former Members

- Julia Mensink – keyboards, (2006–2009)
- Graham Plant – guitar, (2006–2014)
- Tim Daugulis – keyboards, (2009–2013)

== Discography ==
=== EPs ===
- 2008: Wildlife

=== Albums ===
- 2010: Strike Hard, Young Diamond, CAN No. 55
- 2013: On the Heart
- 2016: Age of Everything
- 2019: Take the Light with You

== See also ==
- List of bands from Canada
