= Oceans Will Rise =

Studio album by the Stills
- Released: August 19, 2008
- Recorded: 2007–2008
- Genre: Indie rock
- Length: 48:16
- Label: Arts & Crafts
- Producers: Gus Van Go, The Stills

The Stills chronology
Without Feathers (2006)	Oceans Will Rise (2008)

Professional ratings
Aggregate scores
Source	Rating
Metacritic	64/100
Review scores
Source	Rating
AllMusic	4/5 stars
Blender	4/5 stars
eMusic	4/5 stars
Pitchfork	5.8/10
PopMatters	6/10 stars
Reax Magazine	4/5 stars
Spin	2.5/5 stars
Sputnikmusic	3/5 stars

Oceans Will Rise is the third and final album by Montreal indie rock band the Stills, released August 19, 2008.

In late 2007, Toronto-based record label Arts & Crafts signed the band to a worldwide recording deal. Once again working with producer Gus Van Go, the group felt, according to vocalist Tim Fletcher, "a raw energy of inspiration" during the new album's recording efforts that was absent in previous sessions. Two tracks, "Being Here" and "Rooibos/Palm Wine Drinkard", were first available for download via Spin magazine's website.

Pitchfork noted that the album "reconciled the mannered 1980s sound that first got them noticed with the open-hearted earthiness of their sophomore effort".

Oceans Will Rise was awarded a Juno Award for Alternative Album of the Year on March 28, 2009.

The track "Everything I Build" was featured in the 2009 episode "Rubicon" of ABC television series Defying Gravity. The track "I'm With You" was featured in an Alexander Keith's beer commercial in Canada.

== Track listing ==
1. "Don't Talk Down" – 4:08
2. "Snow in California" – 3:52
3. "Snakecharming the Masses" – 4:21
4. "Being Here" – 3:29
5. "Everything I Build" – 3:47
6. "Panic" – 3:43
7. "Eastern Europe" – 3:08
8. "Hands on Fire" – 4:57
9. "Dinosaurs" – 3:45
10. "I'm with You" – 3:22
11. "Rooibos/Palm Wine Drinkard" – 5:43
12. "Statue of Sirens" – 4:02

== Singles ==
- "Being Here" (August 4, 2008)
- "Don't Talk Down" (December 15, 2008)
- "I'm With You" (April 2009)
