= Liam O'Neil (musician) =

Canadian musician (born 1980)

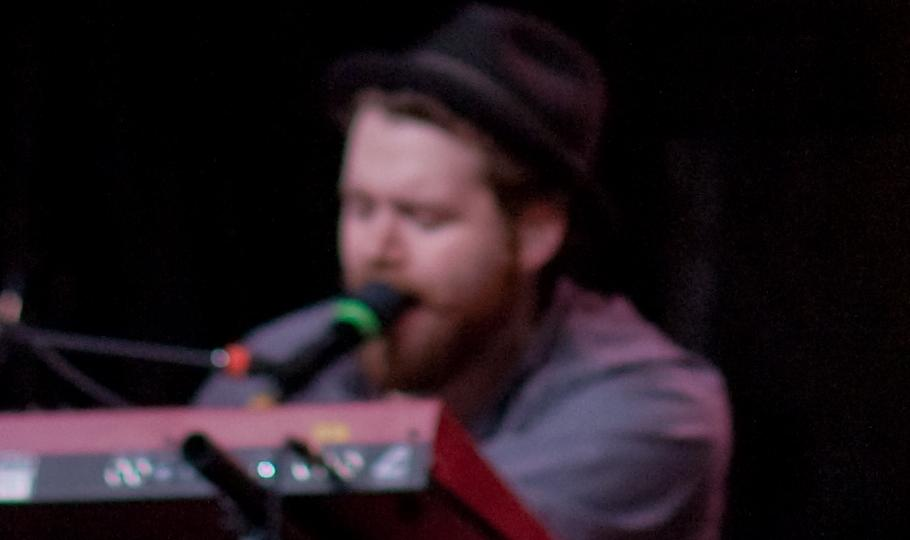

Background information
- Born: September 18, 1980 (age 45); Montreal, Quebec, Canada
- Genres: Indie rock
- Instruments: Piano, keyboards, percussion, vocals
- Years active: 2000 – present

Liam O'Neil (born September 18, 1980) is a Canadian musician and music producer, best known as the keyboardist and percussionist for Montreal-based band the Stills. He met the group's primary songwriter, Dave Hamelin, at school through a mutual friend. In 1996, the pair formed a ska band, in which O'Neil played saxophone. He later spent 18 months away from Montreal while he played in a jazz trio on a cruise ship, but he stayed in contact with the members of the Stills. After initially touring with the band, he became a full-time member when his bandmates heard him play a half-hour piano solo in a hotel bar. His first album with the band was Without Feathers. A talented multi-instrumentalist, he played piano, organ, saxophone, and tambourine on the record, as well as providing backing vocals on a number of tracks.

O'Neil contributed synth, piano, organ, and baritone and tenor sax to various tracks on Kings of Leon's 2010 album Come Around Sundown. He also collaborated with the band on their 2016 album W.A.L.L.S. O'Neil is currently a touring member of Kings of Leon.

He is also involved with hip hop act Da Gryptions, featuring members of Stars and Young Galaxy.
