= Dave Hamelin =

Canadian musician (born 1980)

- Born: David Charles Hamelin; October 3, 1980 (age 46)
- Origin: Lachine, Quebec, Canada
- Occupations: Singer-songwriter, musician
- Instruments: Guitar, vocals, drums synthesizer

David Charles Hamelin (born October 3, 1980) is a Canadian musician, songwriter and Grammy Award-winning producer known for his work with indie rock band the Stills. Originally the band's drummer, he moved to guitar and co-lead vocalist in 2005 when guitarist Greg Paquet left the band.

On March 28, 2009, the Stills were awarded two Juno Awards for their album Oceans Will Rise, in the categories of Best New Group and Best Alternative Album. In 2010, Paquet rejoined and Hamelin moved back to drums. The Stills announced their breakup on April 15, 2011.

In 2009, Hamelin formed the band Eight and a Half with Stills' keyboardist Liam O'Neil and Broken Social Scene drummer Justin Peroff. They released their self-titled debut in 2012.

== Production work ==
From 2013 onward, Hamelin has worked frequently as a producer.

He co-produced and mixed Broken Social Scene frontman Kevin Drew's second solo record, Darlings (2014); co-produced and mixed Andy Kim's It's Decided (2015) with Drew and Ohad Benchetrit; co-produced and mixed the Tragically Hip's album Man Machine Poem (2016) with Drew; and co-produced and mixed Gord Downie's album Secret Path (2016).

In 2016, he mixed the Sam Roberts Band album TerraForm

He produced and mixed the Belle Game's 2016 single "Yuh", as well as their 2017 album Fear Nothing.

In 2017, Hamelin played on and mixed Downie's final album, Introduce Yerself.

Hamelin co-wrote, produced and mixed the Leikeli47 track "Chain Gang" for the soundtrack to the 2018 film Uncle Drew.

Hamelin produced 9 songs on 070 Shake's 2020 album Modus Vivendi and was an executive producer on her sophomore album You Can't Kill Me, contributing to every song on the album. His work with 070 Shake led to him producing "Scar" from Beyoncé's project The Lion King: The Gift the year prior, before contributing to "Alien Superstar" from 2022 album Renaissance, and six songs on 2024 album Cowboy Carter, winning a Grammy Award for Album of the Year.

== Discography ==
=== As band member ===
Year	Band	Release
2003	The Stills	Rememberese EP
2003	The Stills	Logic Will Break Your Heart
2006	The Stills	Without Feathers
2008	The Stills	Oceans Will Rise
2012	Eight and a Half	Eight and a Half

=== Songs credits ===
List of production and songwriting (non-performing) credits for other artists, excluding interpolations and samples.
Track(s)	Year	Credit	Artist(s)	Album
Darlings	2014	Co-producer, mixer	Kevin Drew	Non-album single
It's Decided	2015	Andy Kim	Producer, mixer	Non-album single
"TerraForm"	2016	Mixer	Sam Roberts Band	TerraForm
"Chain Gang"	2018	Co-writer, producer, mixer	Leikeli47	Uncle Drew
"Mulita"	2018	Producer, composer	Leikeli47	Insecure (TV Series Soundtrack)
"On and On"	2018	Co-producer, composer	Clyde Guevera	Still Illin
"Baby Save Me Tonight"	2018	Co-writer	May	Non-album single
"More Than Words"	2018	Producer	Isabella	Non-album single
"Nice to Have"	2019	Producer	070 Shake	Modus Vivendi
"Morrow"	2019	Producer	070 Shake	Modus Vivendi
"SCAR"	2019	Producer	070 Shake and Jessie Reyez	The Lion King: The Gift
"My Way"	2020	Producer	CL	
"My Way"	2020	Producer	CL	
"5 STAR"	2020	Producer	CL	
"HWA"	2020	Producer	CL	
"Alien Superstar"	2022	Co-writer	Beyoncé	Renaissance
"Natural Habitat"	2023	Producer	070 Shake	Non-album single
"16 Carriages"	2024	Co-producer, co-writer	Beyoncé	Cowboy Carter
"Smoke Hour II"	2024	Co-producer, co-writer	Beyoncé	Cowboy Carter
"Just for Fun"	2024	Co-producer, co-writer	Beyoncé	Cowboy Carter
"II Hands II Heaven"	2024	Co-producer, co-writer	Beyoncé	Cowboy Carter
"Amen"	2024	Co-producer, co-writer	Beyoncé	Cowboy Carter
"Tyrant"	2024	Co-writer	Beyoncé	Cowboy Carter
"The Blade"	2024	Co-producer	Aurora	What Happened to the Heart?
"Damn"	2025	Co-producer, co-writer	Del Water Gap	Chasing the Chimera
"FUFN (Fuck You For Now)"	2025	Co-producer, co-writer	JADE	That's Showbiz Baby
"Dreamcheater"	2025	Co-producer, co-writer	JADE	That's Showbiz Baby
"TAR"	2025	Co-producer, co-writer	JADE	That's Showbiz Baby
"I Just Don't Know You Yet"	2026	Co-writer, producer	Absolutely	Paracosm
"Elevator"	2026	Co-writer, producer	Absolutely	Paracosm
"No More Disco"	2026	Co-writer, producer	Yeonjun	No Labels: Part 02
"Heaven"	2026	Co-writer, additional producer	Jennie	Fallen Angel
"Cloud 9"	2026	Co-writer, producer	Tinashe	Popstar
"Pop"	2026	Co-writer, producer	Illit	Break Even

=== Albums credits ===
List of production and songwriting (non-performing) credits for other artists, excluding interpolations and samples.
Album(s)	Year	Credit	Artist(s)	Notes
Man Machine Poem	2016	Producer, keyboards, percussion	The Tragically Hip	All album tracks
Secret Path	2016	Co-producer, mixer	Gord Downie	All album tracks excluding track four
Fear Nothing	2017	Producer, mixer	The Belle Game	All album tracks
Introduce Yerself	2017	Instrumentalist, mixer	Gord Downie	All album tracks
Acrylic	2018	Co-producer, mixer	Leikeli47	All album tracks
You Can't Kill Me	2022	Co-producer, Co-writer	070 Shake	All album tracks
Cerebrum	2023	Co-producer, Co-writer	Absolutely	All album tracks excluding track ten

== Awards and nominations ==
Year	Ceremony	Award	Result	Ref
2023	65th Annual Grammy Awards	Album of the Year (Renaissance)	Nominated	
2026	67th Annual Grammy Awards	Album of the Year (Cowboy Carter)	Won	
