= Urgency (Low Level Flight album) =

Studio album by Low Level Flight
- Released: March 27, 2007
- Genre: Alternative Rock
- Length: 35:49
- Label: I Heart Records
- Producer: Mike Borkosky

Low Level Flight chronology
Urgency (2007)	Through These Walls (2011)

Singles from Urgency
- 1. "Change for Me" Released: March 6, 2007; 2. "Say" Released: November 2007; 3. "Turnaround" Released: June 17, 2008

Urgency is the debut album from the Canadian alternative rock band Low Level Flight, released on March 27, 2007. The album spawned three singles: "Change for Me", "Say" and "Turnaround".

== Singles ==
- "Change for Me" - Released on March 6, 2007 as the first single, the song peaked at number 69 on the Canadian Hot 100 chart.
- "Say" - Released in November 2007, the song was a radio hit and peaked at number 22 on the Canadian Hot 100 chart, becoming the band's first single to chart within the Top 30. The song remains the band's most successful song to date.
- "Turnaround" - Released on June 17, 2008 as the third and final single, the song failed to chart.

== Critical reception ==
Professional ratings
Review scores
Source	Rating
Sputnikmusic	1.5/5 stars

The album received a "Very Poor" rating from Sputnikmusic. In describing the album, staff reviewer Tyler Munro writes, "[I]n the end it just comes off as worship and tribute to virtually every sound currently found on the radio."

== Track listing ==
No.	Title	Writer(s)	Length
1.	"Change for Me"	R. Malcolm, A. Alexander, C. Perry	3:38
2.	"Hesitate"	R. Malcolm, J. Rooke, S. Noronha, M. Vanderzand, S. Vanderzand	3:58
3.	"When Will I Learn"	R. Malcolm, L. McMaster, R. Patterson, D. Thomson	3:39
4.	"Hate You"	R. Malcolm, M. Borkosky	3:21
5.	"Turnaround"	R. Malcolm, M. Fox, R. Wells	3:35
6.	"Say"	R. Malcolm, M. Fox, R. Patterson, R. Wells	3:16
7.	"For a Second"	R. Malcolm, D. Martin, D. Thomson	3:48
8.	"Holiday"	R. Malcolm, J. Rooke, S. Noronha, M. Vanderzand, S. Vanderzand	3:22
9.	"Save My Soul"	R. Malcolm, R. Patterson, D. Thomson	3:53
10.	"All That I Need"	R. Malcolm, M. Borkosky	5:19

== Personnel ==
Adapted from the Urgency media notes.

- Ryan Malcolm: lead vocals, acoustic guitar
- Shaun Noronha: bass guitar, backing vocals
- Dave Carter: lead guitar
- James Rooke: rhythm guitar
- Brandon Merenick: drums, percussion
- Ray Coburn: Piano on the tracks "When Will I Learn" and "All That I Need"
- Mike Borkosky: Producer, recording and mix engineer, additional guitars, keys, percussion, and programming
- Michael Rosenberg: Management
- Patrick Duffy: Art direction & Design
- Caitlin Cronenberg: Photography
