= WinterCity Festival =

The WinterCity Festival held in Toronto, Canada, is a 14-day citywide celebration of culture, creativity and cuisine. WinterCity is three festivals in one, The WOW Series, The Warm Up Series and Winterlicious.

The WOW Series is a free series that takes places outdoors at Nathan Phillips Square featuring performances from around the globe geared towards families.

The Warm Up Series takes place at indoor venues across downtown Toronto featuring multi-media events and performances geared towards both family and mature audiences.

Winterlicious a prix-fixe promotion including over 150 Toronto restaurants. It includes culinary events featuring demonstrations and market tours.

== History ==
Every February for the past 29 years, Torontonians have come together to celebrate winter in the city. What began as the North York Winter Carnival in 1980 has grown in leaps and bounds expanding in 1999 to become Winterfest, a Toronto-wide winter celebration.

The evolution continued in 2004, as the festival took on a new guise. Attendance figures have grown from 155,000 in 1998 to more than 560,000 in 2009.
