= The Stills =

Canadian rock band

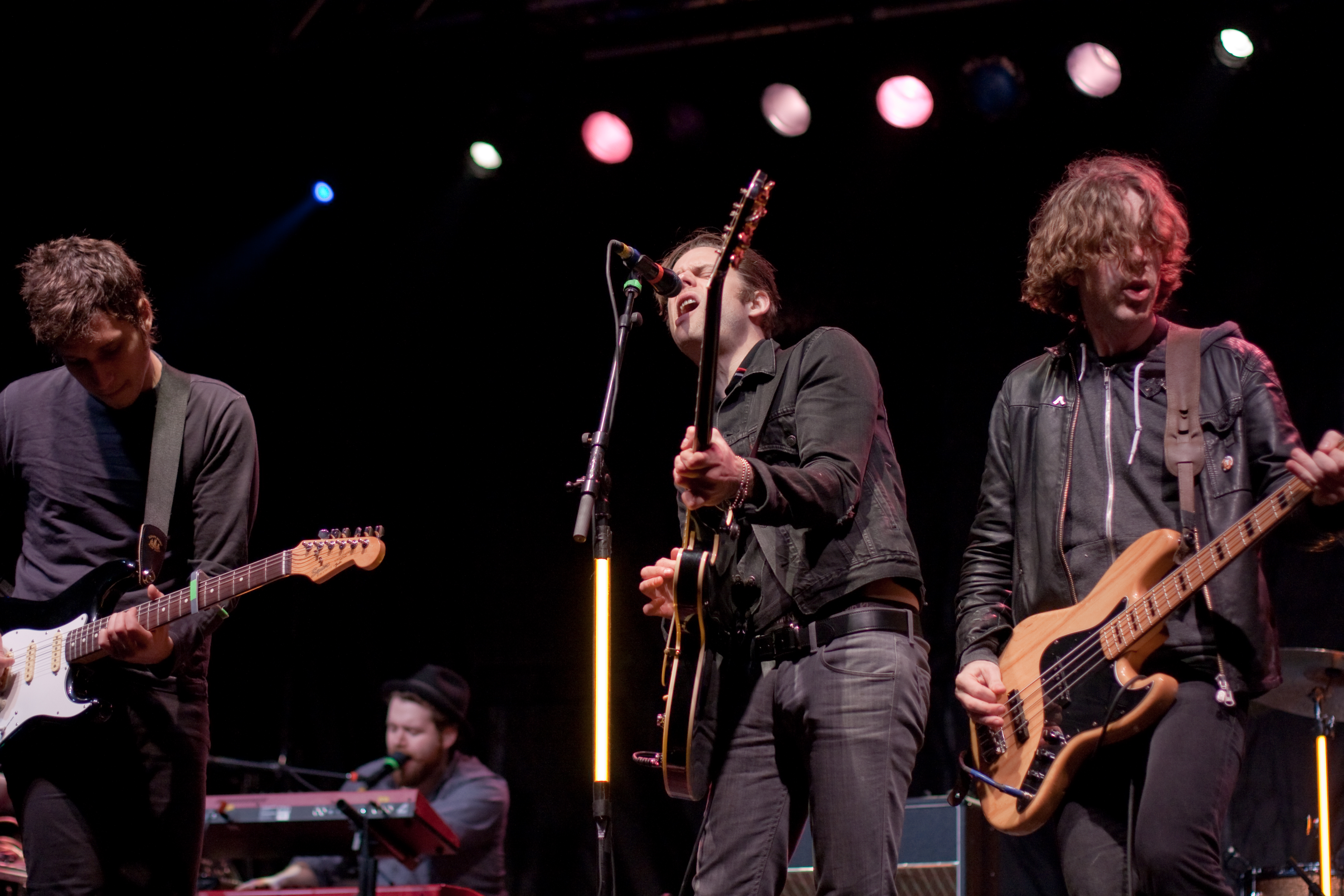
- The Stills performing in Toronto, Ontario. From left to right: Dave Hamelin, Liam O'Neil, Tim Fletcher and Olivier Corbeil.

Background information
- Origin: Montreal, Quebec, Canada
- Genres: Indie rock, post-punk revival
- Years active: 2000–2011
- Labels: Vice Records, 679 Recordings, Drowned in Sound Recordings, Arts & Crafts
- Past members: Tim Fletcher; Greg Paquet; Olivier Corbeil; Dave Hamelin; Liam O'Neil; Julien Blais

The Stills were a Canadian rock band from Montreal, Quebec, formed in 2000 and disbanded in 2011.

== History ==
The band's original lineup consisted of lead vocalist and guitarist Tim Fletcher, guitarist Gregory Paquet, bassist Olivier Corbeil, and drummer Dave Hamelin. The band members had known each other since the age of 12 and played in various bands prior to forming the Stills, including Chinatown, Amentum, and The Undercovers.

Their EP, Rememberese, was released on June 17, 2003, by Vice Records (and in the UK by 679 Recordings), followed by their debut album; both were produced by Gus Van Go. Logic Will Break Your Heart was released in North America on October 21, 2003, and in the UK on February 23, 2004, and included the singles "Lola Stars and Stripes", "Changes Are No Good", and "Still in Love Song". Keyboardist Liam O'Neil played on several of the album's tracks. The album elicited critical acclaim and comparisons to Interpol and Echo & the Bunnymen, with AllMusic citing its "brooding post-punk soundscapes and art rock swagger".

Paquet left the band in 2005 to finish his university degree, and Hamelin moved to guitar, sharing lead vocal duties with Fletcher. Julien Blais joined as drummer, and O'Neil became a full-time member of the band on keyboards.

The Stills' second album, Without Feathers, was released May 9, 2006, on Vice Records (and in the UK by Drowned in Sound Recordings). Again produced by Van Go, it marked a distinct shift in sound, from the 1980s-influenced post-punk revivalism of the debut to a happier, more Americana-oriented sound, which Pitchfork termed "cheerful and heartfelt". It featured guest appearances from Sam Roberts, Emily Haines (Metric), and Jason Collett (Broken Social Scene). They supported Kings of Leon on that band's UK spring tour in 2007; in the same year, they were featured, along with Karkwa, The Besnard Lakes, and Mahjor Bidet, on the bill of Quebec Scene, a concert in Ottawa sponsored by CBC Radio 3.

They signed with Arts & Crafts for the release of their third album, Oceans Will Rise, which was released August 19, 2008. Critics noted that the album "reconciled the mannered 1980s sound that first got them noticed with the open-hearted earthiness of their sophomore effort".

On July 20, 2008, the Stills played in Quebec City, opening for Paul McCartney, for the city's 400th anniversary. On February 7, 2009, they played at Nathan Phillips Square as part of Toronto's WinterCity Festival, and again supported Kings of Leon on a tour of Australia and New Zealand in March 2009.

On March 28, 2009, the Stills were awarded two Juno Awards for their album Oceans Will Rise, in the categories of Best New Group and Best Alternative Album.

On April 29, 2010, the band announced that Paquet was rejoining the band and Hamelin was moving back to drums.

On April 15, 2011, the Stills announced on their site that they had officially disbanded.

== Other projects ==
In 2009, Hamelin, O'Neil and Broken Social Scene drummer Justin Peroff formed the band Eight and a Half, releasing their self-titled debut in 2012.

O'Neil played various instruments on Kings of Leon's 2010 album Come Around Sundown, and is involved with hip-hop act Da Gryptions.

Fletcher sang background vocals on the Sam Roberts Band's 2014 album Lo-Fantasy and played guitar for Canadian rapper k-os. In 2014, he formed the band Beat Cops with Mikey Heppner of Priestess, releasing the album Mean Streets in 2015. That same year, Fletcher released the album Punks on the Moon with his project Voizes. Fletcher then formed Megative with ex-Stills producer Gus Van Go, songwriting duo Like Minds (Jesse Singer and Chris Soper) and dancehall performer Screechy Dan. In 2017, the ensemble debuted with the single "More Time". On July 27, 2018, Megative released their self-titled debut album on Last Gang Records.

== Members ==
- Tim Fletcher – guitar, lead vocals (2000–2011)
- Greg Paquet – guitar (2000–2005, 2010–2011)
- Olivier Corbeil (a.k.a. Oliver Crowe) – bass, backing vocals (2000–2011)
- Dave Hamelin – drums, lead vocals, guitar (2000–2011)
- Liam O'Neil – keyboards, backing vocals, percussion (2005–2011)
- Julien Blais – drums (2005–2010)

== Discography ==
=== Albums ===
Year	Album details	Chart positions	
Year	Album details	US Heat	US Indie
2003	Logic Will Break Your Heart: Released: October 21, 2003; Label: Vice Records	—	39
2006	Without Feathers: Released: May 9, 2006; Label: Vice Records/Drowned in Sound Recordings	6	18
2008	Oceans Will Rise: Released: August 19, 2008; Label: Arts & Crafts	17	—
"—" denotes releases that did not chart

=== EPs ===
- The Stills promo sampler (2003, self-released)
- Rememberese (2003, Vice Records/679 Recordings)
- The Stills: Live EP (2004, Atlantic Records)
- Live Studio Session (2006, Atlantic Records)

=== Singles ===
- "Lola Stars and Stripes" (2004, Vice Records/679 Recordings)
- "Changes Are No Good" (2004, Vice Records/679 Recordings)
- "Still in Love Song" (2004, Vice Records/679 Recordings)
- "In the Beginning" promo (2006, Vice Records)
- "Destroyer" promo (2006, Drowned in Sound Recordings)
- "Helicopters" (2007, Drowned in Sound Recordings)
- "Being Here" (2008, Arts & Crafts)
- "Don't Talk Down" (2008, Arts & Crafts)
- "I'm With You" (2009, Arts & Crafts)

=== Compilation appearances ===
- "Retour à Vega" on Wicker Park (Soundtrack Album) (2004, Lakeshore Records)
- "In the Beginning" on Music from the Motion Picture "P.S. I Love You" (2007, Atlantic Records)
- "Soft Revolution" on Do You Trust your Friends? (Remix album released by Stars) (2007, Arts & Crafts International)

=== Music videos ===
- "Still in Love Song" (2003) - directed by Josh & Xander
- "Lola Stars and Stripes" (2003) - directed by Olivier "Twist" Gondry
- "Changes are No Good" (2004) - directed by Dominic DeJoseph
- "Love and Death" (2004) - directed by Chris Grismer
- "In the Beginning" (2006) - directed by Associates in Science
- "Destroyer" (2006) - directed by Eddy Morretti
- "Helicopters" (2007) - directed by George Vale
- "Being Here" (2008) - directed by Teqtonik
- "Don't Talk Down" (2008) - directed by Christopher Mills
- "I'm With You" (2009) - directed by Carlos and Jason Sanchez
