= Félix Dyotte =

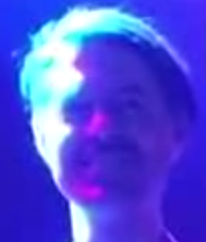
- Félix Dyotte photographed in Boucherville, Québec, Canada at the Mortagne High School.

Background information
- Born: April 4, 1981 (age 45)
- Origin: Montreal, Quebec, Canada
- Genres: Indie rock, pop
- Years active: 2000s—present
- Formerly of: Chinatown
- Website: Official website

Félix Dyotte is a Canadian singer-songwriter from Quebec, who won the SOCAN Songwriting Prize in 2020 as the writer of Evelyne Brochu's single "Maintenant ou jamais". He was nominated for the same award two prior times, for his songs "Avalanches" in 2016 and "Je cours" in 2018.

== History ==
Dyotte was a guitarist with the Undercovers, a band which also included future members of the Stills, before joining with pianist Pierre-Alain Faucon and singer/guitarist Julien Fargo to create the band Chinatown in 2006, adding drummer Gabriel Rousseau and bassist Toby Cayouette. Faucon was best known for the song "Retour à Vega", which had been composed for his previous band in 2002, and then covered by the Stills for the soundtrack of the 2004 film Wicker Park. Chinatown also recorded their own version of "Retour à Vega" on their second album.

Chinatown released their debut EP, L'amour, le rêve et le whisky, in 2007 on the Tacca Musique label, followed by two studio albums, Cité d'or (2009) and Comment j'ai explosé (2012).

Following Chinatown's breakup, Dyotte released his self-titled solo album in 2015, followed by Politesses in 2017. He has also recorded a number of non-album singles as duets with other vocalists, including "Amour, amour" with Monia Chokri, "Effeuille-moi le cœur" with Kandle and "C'est l'été, c'est l'été, c'est l'été" with Evelyne Brochu.

== Band members ==
- Felix Dyotte: vocals, guitar
- Jason Kent: bass, vocals
- Francis Mineau: drums

== Discography ==
=== Chinatown ===
- L'amour, le rêve et le whisky (2007)
- Cité d'or (2009)
- Comment j'ai explosé (2012)

=== Solo ===
- Félix Dyotte (2015)
- Politesses (2017)
