= List of Winnipeg musicians =

This is a selection of singer/songwriters, musicians and bands from Winnipeg, Manitoba, Canada.

== Bands ==
- Alphabet Soup Children's Entertainment
- Bachman–Turner Overdrive
- Begonia
- Brother
- burnthe8track
- Comeback Kid
- Crash Test Dummies
- The Details
- The Duhks
- Duotang
- Eagle & Hawk
- Easily Amused
- Electro Quarterstaff
- Figure Four
- Grand Analog
- The Guess Who
- Harlequin
- High Five Drive
- Imaginary Cities
- Jet Set Satellite
- The Judes
- KEN mode
- Kittens
- McMaster and James
- Mood Ruff
- Nathan
- New Meanies
- Novillero
- Painted Thin
- Paper Moon
- Petric
- The Paperbacks
- The Perpetrators
- Propagandhi
- Royal Canoe
- Starfield
- Streetheart
- Swallowing Shit
- Tin Foil Phoenix
- Wailin' Jennys
- The Waking Eyes
- The Watchmen
- The Weakerthans
- You Know I Know

== Solo artists, singer-songwriters ==
- Chad Allan
- Don Amero
- Maria Aragon
- Randy Bachman
- Tal Bachman
- Del Barber
- Steve Bell
- Heather Bishop
- Boy Golden
- Oscar Brand
- Lenny Breau
- Chris Burke-Gaffney
- Marco Castillo
- Burton Cummings
- Stu Davis
- Mitch Dorge
- Amanda Falk
- Christine Fellows
- Goody Grace
- Joey Gregorash
- Terry Jacks
- Cat Jahnke
- David James
- Rob James
- JayWood
- James Keelaghan
- Mike Keller
- Ash Koley
- Chantal Kreviazuk
- Daniel Lavoie
- Gisele MacKenzie
- Fraser MacPherson
- Greg MacPherson
- Romi Mayes
- Alexander McCowan
- Loreena McKennitt
- Holly McNarland
- Ruth Moody
- Sierra Noble
- Bob Nolan
- Fred Penner-children's folk singer
- William Prince
- Bob Rock
- Claire Rousay
- Pete Samples
- John K. Samson
- Remy Shand
- Shingoose
- Al Simmons-children's vaudevillian comedy singer
- Terry Spencer
- Venetian Snares
- Beth Torbert, better known as Bif Naked
- Lindy Vopnfjörð
- Maiko Watson
- Neil Young
- Young Kidd

== Classical musicians, composers, conductors ==
- Endre Johannes Cleven (b. 1874 Norway, d. 1916 Manitoba)
- Tracy Dahl
- Dorothy Howard (mezzo-soprano)
- Lubomyr Melnyk
- Randolph Peters
