= Chantal Kreviazuk production discography =

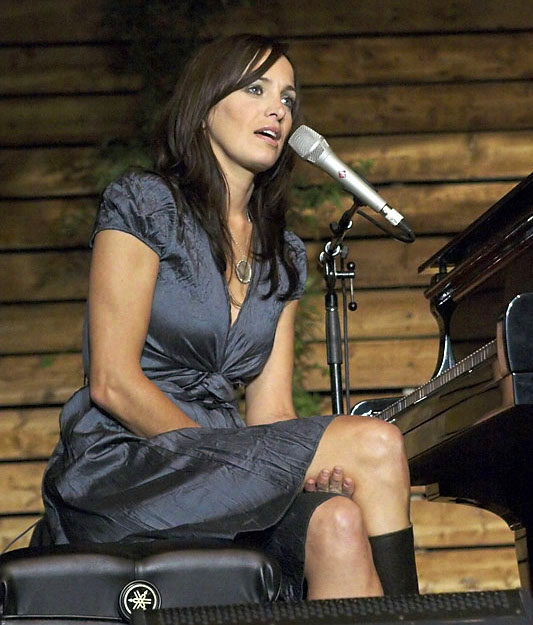
Chantal Kreviazuk during a September 2007 performance at Jackson-Triggs Winery (Niagara-on-the-Lake, Ontario, Canada)

Canadian singer-songwriter, producer and pianist Chantal Kreviazuk has written, produced and performed on albums and tracks for a wide range recording artists, spanning from adult contemporary, pop, rock, to indie and hip-hop music. Initially, she began writing her own pop songs, especially after a 1994 motorcycle accident in Italy left her immobile for several months, and was signed by Sony Canada, where she released her debut album in June 1997. Kreviazuk later released another album in 1999, before being featured in a range of soundtracks to films and TV series. Kreviazuk began writing for other artists in 2001, where she co-wrote the song "Always and Forever" for Eleanor McCain. However, it was only in 2004 that Kreviazuk started writing for more artists and received recognition as a songwriter. In the summer of 2003, Kreviazuk met Canadian singer-songwriter Avril Lavigne, they formed a relationship of mutual respect and sisterhood, and eventually became songwriting partners. Also in 2004, Kreviazuk co-wrote "Rich Girl", for Gwen Stefani's solo debut album, Love. Angel. Music. Baby.. The song became a chart success, reaching the top-ten in over fifteen countries.

In 2006, Kreviazuk continued to co-write songs for artists with her husband Raine Maida, including The Veronicas' "Revolution" (a top-twenty hit), Canadian Idol winner Eva Avila's debut single "Meant to Fly" (a number-one hit in Canada) and others. Kreviazuk also co-wrote songs for her husband, including Maida's debut album The Hunters Lullaby (2007), while also writing for famous artists, such as Mandy Moore for her fifth studio album Wild Hope (2007), on the track "Gardenia", and Kelly Clarkson's third studio album My December (2007), on the track "One Minute", which became a top-forty hit in Australia. In 2008, Kreviazuk wrote for American Idol winner David Cook's eponymous debut album, co-writing a track called "Permanent", which became a success in Canada and the U.S.

== As writer ==
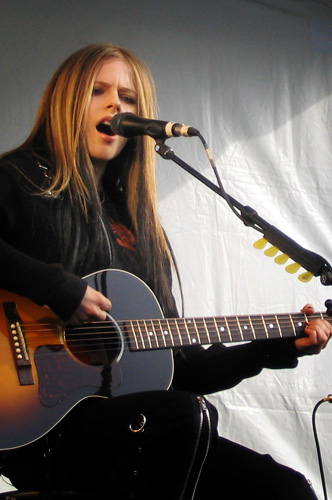
Avril Lavigne was the first artist Kreviazuk co-wrote songs with; both worked on six tracks from Lavigne's sophomore album Under My Skin.

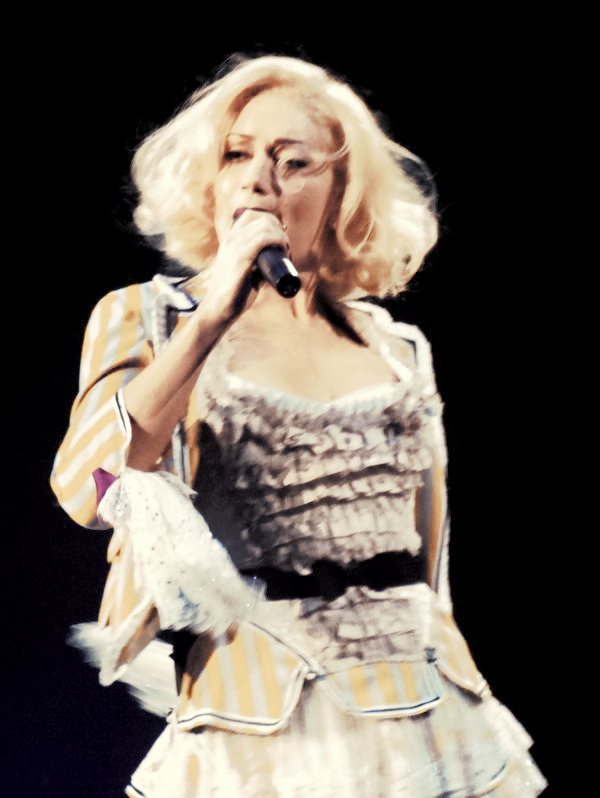
Gwen Stefani's "Rich Girl" was Kreviazuk's first hit as a songwriter.

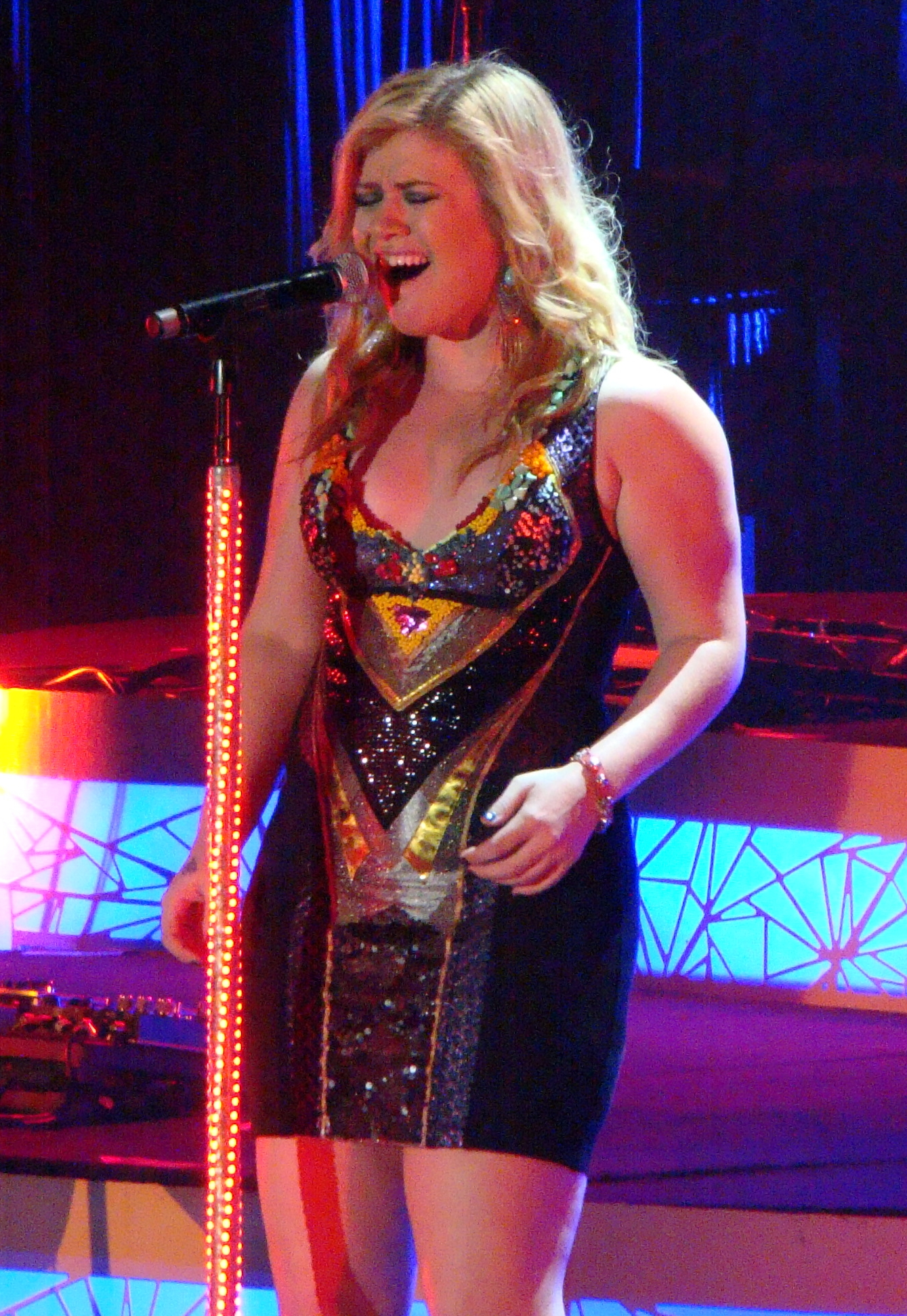
Kreviazuk worked with Kelly Clarkson on two of her albums: Breakaway (which includes the worldwide hit single "Walk Away") and My December (which includes the Australian-single "One Minute").

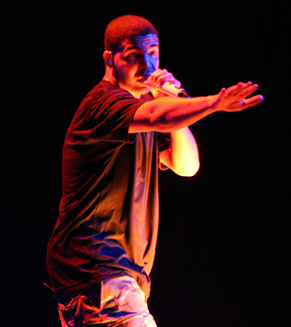
In 2011, Kreviazuk co-wrote, co-produced and provided additional vocals on the track "Over My Dead Body" for Drake's second studio album Take Care.

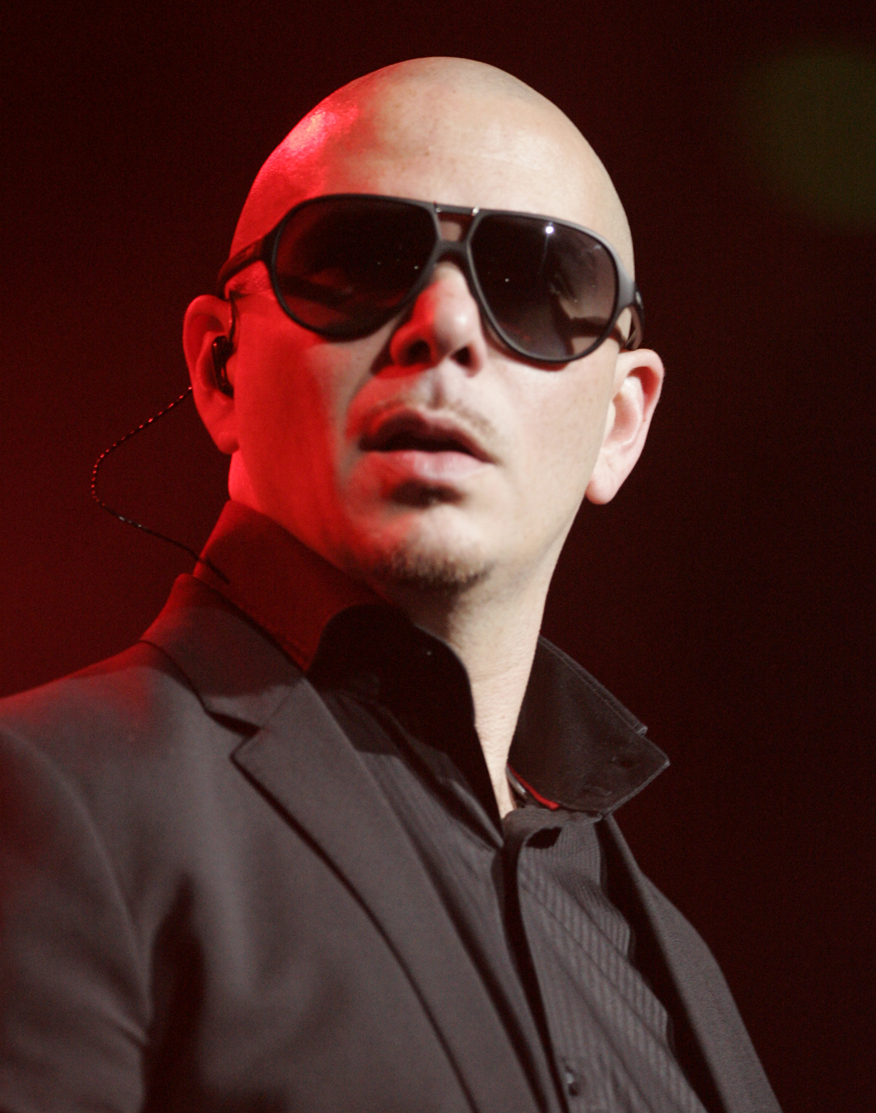
In 2012, Kreviazuk co-wrote Pitbull's worldwide smash "Feel This Moment".

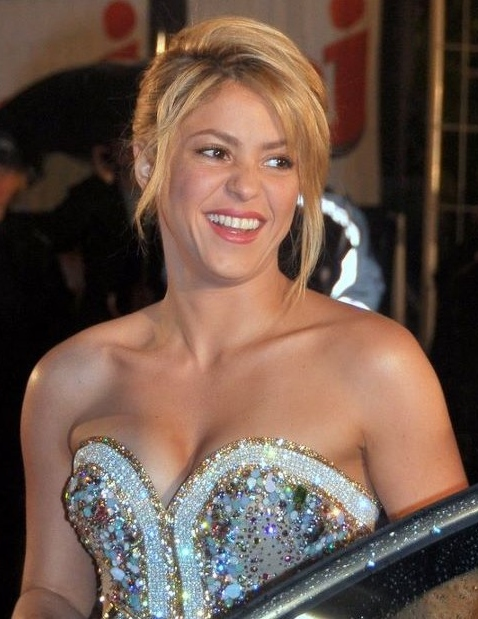
In 2014, Kreviazuk returned to write for famous female singers, co-writing for Shakira the song "You Don't Care About Me", from her eponymous tenth album.

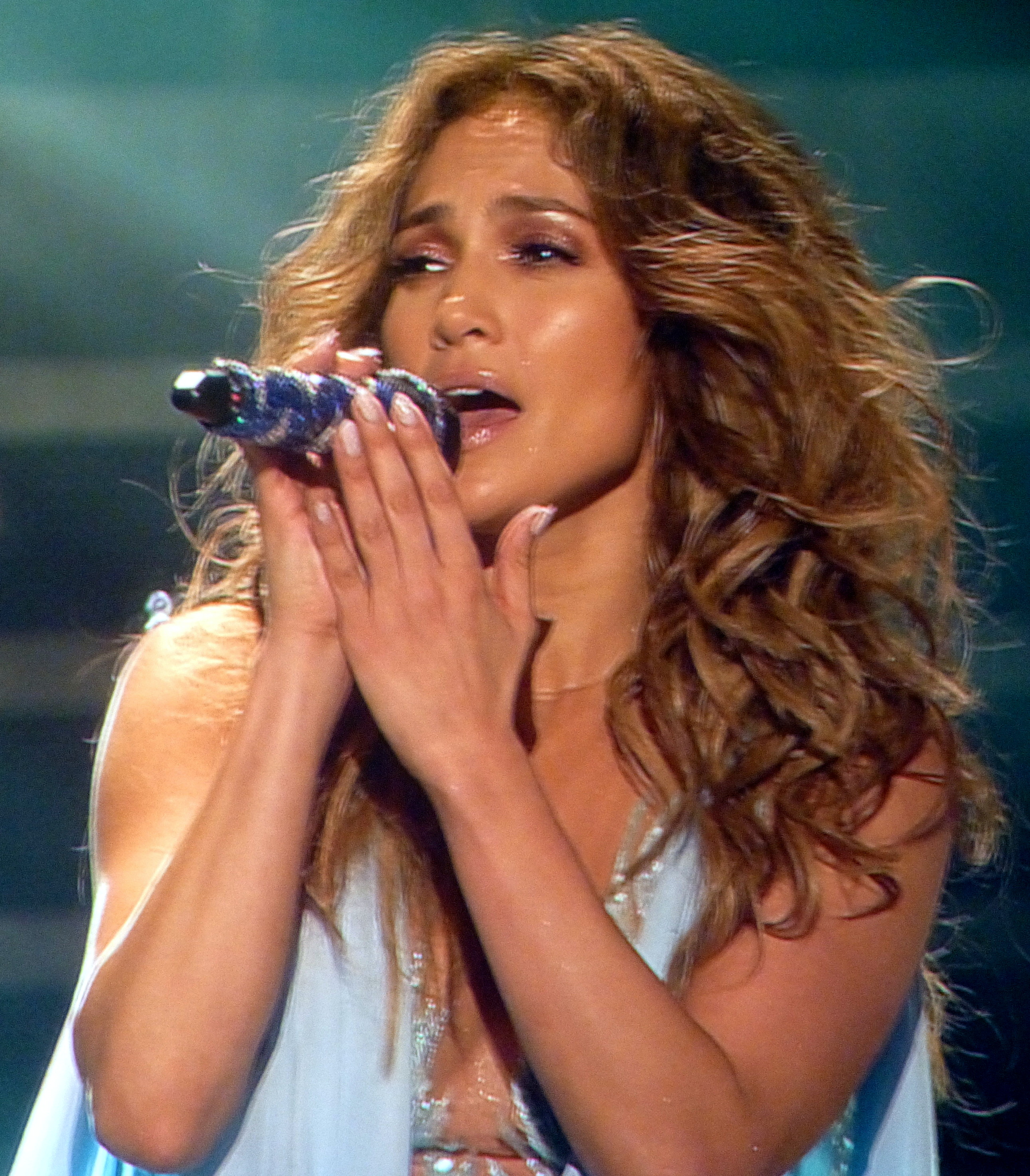
Kreviazuk co-wrote "Emotions", a song from A.K.A., Jennifer Lopez's eighth studio album.

Discography
Year	Artist	Album	Song	Co-written with
2001	Eleanor McCain	Intimated	"Always and Forever"	
2004	Avril Lavigne	Under My Skin	"Together"	Avril Lavigne
2004	Avril Lavigne	Under My Skin	"He Wasn't"	Lavigne
2004	Avril Lavigne	Under My Skin	"How Does It Feel"	Lavigne
2004	Avril Lavigne	Under My Skin	"Forgotten"	Lavigne
2004	Avril Lavigne	Under My Skin	"Who Knows"	Lavigne
2004	Avril Lavigne	Under My Skin	"Slipped Away"	Lavigne
2004	Gwen Stefani	Love. Angel. Music. Baby.	"Rich Girl"	Andre Young, Gwen Stefani, Jerry Bock, Mark Batson, Kara DioGuardi, Mike Elizondo, Sheldon Harnick, Eve.
2004	Kelly Clarkson	Breakaway	"Where Is Your Heart"	Kelly Clarkson, Kara Dioguardi
2004	Kelly Clarkson	Breakaway	"Walk Away"	Clarkson, DioGuardi, Raine Maida
2005	Marion Raven	Here I Am	"13 Days"	Raine Maida, Marion Raven
2006	The Veronicas	The Secret Life of... The Veronicas	"Revolution"	Raine Maida
2006	Cheyenne Kimball	The Day Has Come	"Hanging On"	Cheyenne Kimball, Raine Maida
2006	Eva Avila	Somewhere Else	"Meant to Fly"	Raine Maida, Gaby Moreno
2006	Rex Goudie	Look Closer	"You Got to Me"	Kara Dioguardi, Raine Maida
2007	Mandy Moore	Wild Hope	"Gardenia"	Moore
2007	Dianna Corcoran	Then There's Me	"Weight of the World"	
2007	Jessica Mauboy	The Journey	"Walk Away" (Kelly Clarkson cover)	Clarkson, Dioguardi, Maida
2007	Raine Maida	The Hunters Lullaby	"Careful What You Wish For"	Maida
2007	Taryn Manning	Weirdsville (soundtrack)	"It's Not My Fault"	Mike Elizondo, Taryn Manning
2007	Sasha & Shawna	Siren	"I Know It's Real"	
2007	Kelly Clarkson	My December	"One Minute"	Clarkson, Dioguardi
2008	David Cook	David Cook	"Permanent"	David Cook, Raine Maida
2009	Carrie Underwood	Play On	"Unapologize"	Underwood, Maida
2009	Hawk Nelson	Live Life Loud	"The Job"	Hawk Nelson, Steve Wilson
2009	Die Mannequin	Fino + Bleed	"Dead Honey"	Care Failure, Raine Maida
2010	Miranda Cosgrove	Sparks Fly	"Daydream"	Avril Lavigne
2010	Esmée Denters	Outta Here	"Memories Turn to Dust"	
2010	Joe Cocker	Hard Knocks	"So"	Thomas "Tawgs" Salter
2011	Drake	Take Care	"Over My Dead Body" (also a co-producer)	Drake, Noah "40" Shebib, Anthony Palman
2011	Kate Voegele	Gravity Happens	"Heart in Chains"	Voegele, Raine Maida
2011	Namie Amuro	Checkmate!	"Wonder Woman"	Tiger, Marek Pompetzki, Paul NZA, Tanya Lacey
2012	Meiko	The Bright Side	"I'm Not Sorry"	Maida, Meiko
2012	Stefanie Heinzmann	Stefanie Heinzmann	"Not At All"	Marek Pompetzki, Paul NZA, Cecil Remmler
2012	Pitbull	Global Warming	"Feel This Moment"	Nasri Atweh, Adam Messinger, Sir Nolan, DJ Buddha, Pitbull, Christina Aguilera
2014	Shakira	Shakira	"You Don't Care About Me"	Nasri Atweh, Adam Messinger
2014	Kid Ink	My Own Lane	"No Miracles"	Brian Collins, Richard Baker, Yoan Chirescu, Joseph, Raphaël Jurdin, Pierre-Antoine Melki, Demonté Posey
2014	Lea Michelle	Louder	"Burn with You"	Nasri Atweh, Nolan Lambroza, Adam Messinger
2014	Afrojack	Forget the World	"Born to Run"	Van de Wall, Bobby Andonov, Sam Watters, Clarence Coffee, Jr., Deekay, DJ Buddha, Polow da Don
2014	Jennifer Lopez	A.K.A.	"Emotions"	Chris Brown, Shama Joseph, Jennifer Lopez, Cory Rooney
2016	Britney Spears	Glory	"If I'm Dancing"	Brandon Lowry, Simon Wilcox, Ian Kirkpatrick
2017	Lea Michele	Places	"Love Is Alive"	Nathan Chapman
2017	Rita Ora	Fifty Shades Darker: Original Motion Picture Soundtrack	"Kiss Me"	Marc Lomax, Jordan K. Johnson, Clarence Coffee, Jr, Stefan Johnson
2020	JoJo	Good to Know	"So Bad"	Joanna Levesque, Merna Bishouty, Martin McKinney, Dylan Wiggins
