= Canadian Idol season 4 =

Canadian Idol
- Season 4
- Hosted by: Ben Mulroney
- Judges: Farley Flex; Jake Gold; Sass Jordan; Zack Werner
- Winner: Eva Avila
- Runner-up: Craig Sharpe

Release
- Original network: CTV
- Original release: May 29 – September 17, 2006

Season chronology
- ← Previous; Season 3 Next → Season 5

The fourth season of Canadian Idol began in February 2006 ran until September 2006. Zack Werner, Jake Gold, Sass Jordan, and Farley Flex returned to judge, and Ben Mulroney returned to host, with Elena Juatco as the new roving reporter. The season premiered on May 29, five days after the finale of American Idol Season 5. The Canadian Idol title was awarded to competitor Eva Avila on September 17, 2006.

== Auditions ==
Auditions were held in eleven cities in the Winter and early Spring of 2006 in the following order:

- February 18 & 19: Edmonton
- February 23: Yellowknife (advance city)
- February 25 & 26: Vancouver
- March 4 & 5: Regina
- March 11 & 12: Winnipeg
- March 17 & 18: Montreal
- March 25 & 26: Ottawa
- April 8 & 9: Halifax
- April 18: St. John's
- April 22 & 23: Kitchener, Ontario
- April 28 & 30: Toronto

=== Notable auditioners ===
- Leo Johnson: It was their 4th audition for the show; they are notable for farting just as they were about to sing, and then gasping "I totally just farted!", which sent the judges into a laughter frenzy. This infamous moment later aired on Most Outrageous Moments, and is very popular on YouTube.

== Top 22, the semi-finals ==
For the fourth season, the format of the preliminary rounds was changed, based on American Idol's Top 24. The wildcard round was abolished; instead, the Top 22 was divided into a group of 11 men and another group of 11 women. Two competitors were eliminated from each group for three weeks, resulting in a 5 male and 5 female Top 10 for the finals.

The Toronto elimination rounds were aired in a two-hour broadcast on June 20. One original member of the Top 22, Philip King, dropped out for unspecified personal reasons and was replaced by Chris Labelle.

Those who were eliminated before the finals are listed below.

=== Males eliminated ===
- Sheldon Elter, 27, is from Edmonton, Alberta and an accomplished local theatrical writer and actor. His one-man play, Metis Mutt, which was performed at the Edmonton International Fringe Festival in 2002, won him two local awards. He is the first aboriginal competitor in the program's history.
- Keith Macpherson, 27, is from Winnipeg, Manitoba, but auditioned in Toronto. An English major at the University of Winnipeg, he sings in the local pop group Easily Amused.
- Chris Labelle, 24, is a bar server from Ottawa, Ontario. He was originally cut from the Top 22, but was named to the semi-finals after Phil King quit.
- Greg Neufeld, 22, is from Abbotsford, British Columbia, and auditioned in Vancouver. He is a member of the band Di Marco. Greg auditioned again for Canadian Idol Season 5 and made the Top 10.
- Jeremy Kozielec (or simply Koz), 26, is from Winnipeg, Manitoba, and the lead singer of independent band Floor 13. He made the top 50 for Rock Star: INXS in 2005.
- Nathan Brown, 26, is from Dewberry, Alberta, and auditioned in Edmonton. He is a former cruise ship singer and has built his own personal recording studio in his home.

=== Females eliminated ===
- Ashley Coles, 16, is from Caledonia, Ontario, who auditioned in Kitchener. She is a Grade 11 student at McKinnon Park Secondary School.
- Nancy Silverman, 19, is from Thornhill, Ontario, and auditioned in Kitchener. She is a student of musical theatre at Sheridan College.
- Alisha Nauth, 19, is from Kitchener, Ontario, and a student at Humber College. She has performed at several local events and competitions in her career.
- Alyssa Klazek, 17, is from Calgary, Alberta and auditioned in Edmonton. She is a Grade 11 student at Bishop Carroll High School.
- Anna-Belle Oliva, 20, is from Montreal, Quebec, and a recent graduate of a musical school. Her audition video centered around the recent death of her brother. When she was 16 years old, she was in the TV series Mixmania in Quebec, in a group called Aucun Regret.
- Valérie Jalbert, 21, a music teacher from Saint-Jérôme, Quebec, who auditioned in Montreal, Quebec, is the first competitor in Canadian Idol history to reach the semi-finals in two different seasons. She was eliminated in the first voting round in Season 2.

=== Top 22 ===
==== Men ====
Order	Contestant	Song (original artist)	Result
1	Jeremy Koz	"It's Only Love" (Bryan Adams & Tina Turner)	Eliminated
2	Craig Sharpe	"What Hurts the Most" (Rascal Flatts)	Safe
3	Nathan Brown	"A Change Is Gonna Come" (Sam Cooke)	Eliminated
4	Brandon Jones	"Lady" (Kenny Rogers)	Safe
5	Rob James	"Let's Stay Together" (Al Green)	Bottom 4
6	Keith Macpherson	"Collide" (Howie Day)	Safe
7	Chris Labelle	"Walking in Memphis" (Marc Cohn)	Safe
8	Tyler Lewis	"Here Without You" (3 Doors Down)	Safe
9	Sheldon Elter	"Gonna Move" (Paul Pena)	Bottom 4
10	Chad Doucette	"Tonight I Wanna Cry" (Keith Urban)	Safe
11	Greg Neufeld	"You and I Both" (Jason Mraz)	Safe

==== Women ====
Order	Contestant	Song (original artist)	Result
1	Ashley Coles	"Alone" (Heart)	Safe
2	Kati Durst	"Drift Away" (Dobie Gray)	Safe
3	Alyssa Klazek	"Ready for Love" (India Arie)	Bottom 4
4	Valerie Jalbert	"Remember Me This Way" (Gary Glitter)	Eliminated
5	Steffi D	"I Only Have Eyes for You" (Ella Fitzgerald)	Bottom 4
6	Sarah Loverock	"Since I Fell for You" (Barbra Streisand)	Safe
7	Alisha Nauth	"Always" (Bon Jovi)	Safe
8	Eva Avila	"Angel" (Sarah McLachlan)	Safe
9	Nancy Silverman	"Could I Be Your Girl" (Jann Arden)	Safe
10	Anna-Belle Oliva	"Someone Like You" (Linda Eder)	Eliminated
11	Ashley Coulter	"Bring It On Home to Me" (Sam Cooke)	Safe

=== Top 18 ===
==== Men ====
Order	Contestant	Song (original artist)	Result
1	Greg Neufeld	"Rocket Man" (Elton John)	Eliminated
2	Tyler Lewis	"Mama, I'm Coming Home" (Ozzy Osbourne)	Safe
3	Chris Labelle	"We Shall Be Free" (Garth Brooks)	Eliminated
4	Craig Sharpe	"This I Promise You" (NSYNC)	Safe
5	Sheldon Elter	"Moondance" (Van Morrison)	Bottom 4
6	Chad Doucette	"Save the Last Dance for Me" (The Drifters)	Safe
7	Rob James	"Heaven" (Bryan Adams)	Bottom 4
8	Brandon Jones	"Somebody to Love" (Queen)	Safe
9	Keith Macpherson	"Best I Ever Had (Grey Sky Morning)" (Vertical Horizon)	Safe

==== Women ====
Order	Contestant	Song (original artist)	Result
1	Ashley Coulter	"I'm the Only One" (Melissa Etheridge)	Bottom 4
2	Eva Avila	"Killing Me Softly" (The Fugees)	Safe
3	Alisha Nauth	"Against All Odds (Take a Look at Me Now)" (Mariah Carey)	Eliminated
4	Sarah Loverock	"I Don't Want to Be" (Gavin DeGraw)	Safe
5	Steffi D	"White Flag" (Dido)	Safe
6	Kati Durst	"I Hope You Dance" (Lee Ann Womack)	Safe
7	Ashley Coles	"Misery" (Pink)	Bottom 4
8	Alyssa Klazek	"Magic Carpet Ride" (Steppenwolf)	Eliminated
9	Nancy Silverman	"Fallin'" (Alicia Keys)	Safe

=== Top 14 ===
==== Women ====
Order	Contestant	Song (original artist)	Result
1	Steffi D	"Kiss Me" (Sixpence None the Richer)	Safe
2	Ashley Coles	"Think" (Aretha Franklin)	Eliminated
3	Ashley Coulter	"Crazy" (Patsy Cline)	Safe
4	Nancy Silverman	"Stupid" (Sarah McLachlan)	Eliminated
5	Eva Avila	"Ain't No Mountain High Enough" (Marvin Gaye & Tammi Terrell)	Safe
6	Sarah Loverock	"She Talks to Angels" (The Black Crowes)	Safe
7	Kati Durst	"Not Ready to Make Nice" (Dixie Chicks)	Safe

==== Men ====
Order	Contestant	Song (original artist)	Result
1	Craig Sharpe	"Bohemian Rhapsody" (Queen)	Safe
2	Brandon Jones	"Easy" (Commodores)	Safe
3	Keith Macpherson	"Tempted" (Squeeze)	Eliminated
4	Chad Doucette	"Iris" (Goo Goo Dolls)	Safe
5	Sheldon Elter	"Hard to Handle" (Otis Redding)	Eliminated
6	Tyler Lewis	"Old Time Rock and Roll" (Bob Seger)	Safe
7	Rob James	"Chariot" (Gavin DeGraw)	Safe

== Top 10, the finals ==
After the Semi-Finals, the final 10 competitors are faced with a new theme challenge every week. Based on public voting, one finalist is eliminated each week. The season finale of Canadian Idol took place on September 17, 2006. It was moved from its usual Tuesday result show to Sunday to help CTV premiere their new fall TV shows like The Amazing Race. Eva Avila from Gatineau, Quebec, is 2006 Canadian Idol.

=== Finalists ===
- Eva Avila (born February 25, 1987, in Gatineau, Quebec, 19 years old during the season), is a postal clerk from Hull, Quebec, who auditioned in Ottawa. She was a former winner of the Jeune Diva du Quebec contest. She is the 2006 Canadian Idol.
- Craig Sharpe (born September 23, 1989, in Carbonear, Newfoundland and Labrador, 16 years old during the season), is from Upper Island Cove, Newfoundland, and auditioned in St. John's. He is a Grade 11 student at Ascension Collegiate School.
- Tyler Lewis (born July 3, 1986, 20 years old during the season), is a waiter from Rockglen, Saskatchewan, and auditioned in Regina.
- Chad Doucette (born August 3, 1988, 18 years old during the season), is from East Chezzetcook, Nova Scotia, and auditioned in Halifax. He made the Top 48 in Season 3, but was cut in the last round before the semi-finals. In Season 4, he became known for a "wardrobe malfunction" in the early rounds in which his shirt got stuck in the zipper of his pants during the middle of a song.
- Steffi DiDomenicantonio (known as Steffi D) (born April 28, 1989, in Orleans, Ontario, 17 years old during the season), is from Ottawa, Ontario. A student at Ecole secondaire De La Salle, she has been a stage performer at several Ottawa-area venues. She is known for the trademark bow in her hair.
- Ashley Coulter (born April 26, 1983, in Emeryville, Ontario, 23 years old during the season), is a supermarket cashier from London, Ontario, who auditioned in Kitchener. She was a singer in a local rock band called Nemesis.
- Rob James (born October 30, 1977, 28 years old during the season), is from Winnipeg, Manitoba. He was a former member of the pop group McMaster & James who auditioned for Season 4 after his group's album deal expired. He has also written a song for the debut CD of Season 1 winner Ryan Malcolm.
- Brandon Jones (born June 17, 1989, in St John's, Newfoundland, 17 years old during the season), is from Quispamsis, New Brunswick, and auditioned in his birthplace of St John's, Newfoundland. He is a Grade 11 student at Kennebecasis Valley High School.
- Sarah Loverock (born June 11, 1981, 25 years old during the season), is a supermarket supervisor from Gibsons, British Columbia, who auditioned in Vancouver and has performed in Nashville. She made it to the Top 48 in 2005's Season 3 before being cut. Sarah released a single entitled The Dreamer with America's Hot Musician winners that was certified Gold by the CRIA on November 4, 2009.
- Kati Durst (born December 12, 1979, 26 years old during the season), is an automotive detailer from Goderich, Ontario, who auditioned in Kitchener. Despite having a severe cold when auditioning, she was still put through to the next round.

== Finals ==
=== Top 10 – Canada Rocks! ===
Order	Contestant	Song (original artist)	Result
1	Sarah Loverock	"Life Is a Highway" (Tom Cochrane)	Safe
2	Rob James	"Hurts to Love You" (The Philosopher Kings)	Safe
3	Steffi D	"Alone in the Universe" (David Usher)	Bottom 3
4	Tyler Lewis	"Too Bad" (Nickelback)	Safe
5	Kati Durst	"It Makes No Difference" (The Band)	Eliminated
6	Brandon Jones	"California" (Wave)	Safe
7	Craig Sharpe	"Losing Grip" (Avril Lavigne)	Safe
8	Ashley Coulter	"American Woman" (The Guess Who)	Bottom 2
9	Chad Doucette	"The Other Man" (Sloan)	Safe
10	Eva Avila	"Powerless (Say What You Want)" (Nelly Furtado)	Safe

=== Top 9 – The Rolling Stones ===
Order	Contestant	Song	Result
1	Rob James	"Start Me Up"	Safe
2	Eva Avila	"Wild Horses"	Safe
3	Tyler Lewis	"Paint It Black"	Safe
4	Sarah Loverock	"I Got the Blues"	Eliminated
5	Brandon Jones	"Jumpin' Jack Flash"	Safe
6	Ashley Coulter	"Gimme Shelter"	Bottom 2
7	Chad Doucette	"You Can't Always Get What You Want"	Safe
8	Steffi D	"Miss You"	Bottom 3
9	Craig Sharpe	"Time Is on My Side"	Safe

=== Top 8 – The 80s ===
Order	Contestant	Song (original artist)	Result
1	Brandon Jones	"I'll Be There for You" (Bon Jovi)	Eliminated
2	Craig Sharpe	"Wind Beneath My Wings" (Bette Midler)	Safe
3	Rob James	"You Give Love a Bad Name" (Bon Jovi)	Safe
4	Steffi D	"It's My Life" (Talk Talk)	Safe
5	Chad Doucette	"Never Tear Us Apart" (INXS)	Bottom 2
6	Eva Avila	"White Wedding" (Billy Idol)	Bottom 3
7	Tyler Lewis	"Here I Go Again" (Whitesnake)	Safe
8	Ashley Coulter	"Eternal Flame" (The Bangles)	Safe

=== Top 7 – Classic Rock ===
Order	Contestant	Song (original artist)	Result
1	Rob James	"Some Kind of Wonderful" (Grand Funk Railroad)	Eliminated
2	Tyler Lewis	"Simple Man" (Lynyrd Skynyrd)	Safe
3	Eva Avila	"Who Wants to Live Forever" (Queen)	Safe
4	Craig Sharpe	"Cold as Ice" (Foreigner)	Safe
5	Ashley Coulter	"Knockin' on Heaven's Door" (Avril Lavigne)	Safe
6	Chad Doucette	"Bad Side of the Moon" (April Wine)	Safe
7	Steffi D	"Life on Mars" (David Bowie)	Bottom 2

=== Top 6 – Unplugged ===
Order	Contestant	Song (original artist)	Result
1	Craig Sharpe	"It's My Life" (Bon Jovi)	Bottom 2
2	Ashley Coulter	"Crying" (Roy Orbison)	Eliminated
3	Chad Doucette	"Santa Monica" (Theory of a Deadman)	Safe
4	Steffi D	"Lovefool" (The Cardigans)	Bottom 3
5	Eva Avila	"How Come You Don't Call Me" (Alicia Keys)	Safe
6	Tyler Lewis	"If You Could Only See" (Tonic)	Safe

=== Top 5 – Country ===
Order	Contestant	Song (original artist)	Result
1	Eva Avila	"Here You Come Again" (Dolly Parton)	Bottom 2
2	Tyler Lewis	"Suspicious Minds" (Elvis Presley)	Safe
3	Craig Sharpe	"Always on My Mind" (Willie Nelson)	Safe
4	Steffi D	"These Boots Are Made for Walkin'" (Nancy Sinatra)	Eliminated
5	Chad Doucette	"If You Could Read My Mind" (Gordon Lightfoot)	Safe

=== Top 4 – Judge's Choice ===
Order	Contestant	Song (original artist)	Result
1	Tyler Lewis	"Big League" (Tom Cochrane)	Bottom 2
2	Chad Doucette	"Hanging by a Moment" (Lifehouse)	Eliminated
3	Craig Sharpe	"Careless Whisper" (George Michael)	Safe
4	Eva Avila	"Would I Lie to You" (Eurythmics)	Safe
5	Tyler Lewis	"Tears in Heaven" (Eric Clapton)	Bottom 2
6	Chad Doucette	"Everybody Hurts" (R.E.M.)	Eliminated
7	Craig Sharpe	"The Tears of a Clown" (Smokey Robinson)	Safe
8	Eva Avila	"Old Skool Love" (Divine Brown)	Safe

=== Top 3 – Standards ===
Order	Contestant	Song (original artist)	Result
1	Craig Sharpe	"The Way You Look Tonight" (Frank Sinatra)	Safe
2	Eva Avila	"God Bless the Child" (Billie Holiday)	Safe
3	Tyler Lewis	"Just a Gigolo/I Ain't Got Nobody" (Louis Prima)	Eliminated
4	Craig Sharpe	"Danny Boy" (Elsie Griffin)	Safe
5	Eva Avila	"They Can't Take That Away from Me" (Frank Sinatra)	Safe
6	Tyler Lewis	"It Had to Be You" (Harry Connick Jr.)	Eliminated

=== Finale ===
Each contestant sang three songs.

Order	Contestant	Song (original artist)	Result
1	Craig Sharpe	"Meant to Fly" (Chantal Kreviazuk)	Runner-Up
2	Eva Avila	"Wild Horses" (Natasha Bedingfield)	Winner
3	Craig Sharpe	"I Surrender" (Celine Dion)	Runner-Up
4	Eva Avila	"Meant to Fly" (Chantal Kreviazuk)	Winner
5	Craig Sharpe	"What Hurts the Most" (Rascal Flatts)	Runner-Up
6	Eva Avila	"How Come You Don't Call Me" (Alicia Keys)	Winner

=== The Judges' Comments ===
Listed below is a selection of criticisms and praises from the Judges Jake Gold, Sass Jordan, Farley Flex and Zack Werner from the Top 5 Performance show to the season finale. The songs the idols sang during the performance show can be seen on the list above.

==== Top 2 Performance Show ====
Eva Avila (Winner)

- Sass Jordan: "You are an international artist and you are the jewel in the Canadian Idol crown" (1-Wild Horses)
- Jake Gold: "I'd love to hear the recorded version of that song. It was wonderful" (2-Meant to Fly)
- Zack Werner: "You're a songwriter's dream." (2-Meant to Fly)
- Farley Flex: "Your performance was my favourite performance on Idol, but not just of you, of anybody" (3-How come you don't call me)
- Zack Werner: "Clive Davis should come here and kiss your Canadian ***" (3-How come you don't call me)
- Sass Jordan, Farley Flex, Jake Gold: [STANDING OVATION](3-How come you don't call me)

Craig Sharpe (Runner Up)

- Jake Gold: "That was, without a doubt, the best thing you've done on this show" (1-Meant to Fly)
- Farley Flex: "To step up at this point in time shows you're a man to be respected" (1-Meant to Fly)
- Zack Werner: (Hugged Craig) (1-Meant to Fly)
- Zack Werner: "You're the Freddie Mercury of Canada" (2-I Surrender)
- Sass Jordan: "The first time I saw you in Newfoundland I knew you were a star and my opinion hasn't changed a bit" (3-What hurts the most)

==== Top 3 Performance Show ====
Tyler Lewis: (Eliminated)

- Farley Flex: "You just got the most votes for one singular body movement" (1)
- Zack Werner: "It wasn't very much on the singing part but I think you may just have won Canada's next top model" (1)
- Sass Jordan: "Tyler...it had to be you!" (2)
- Farley Flex:: "You really took it by the horns" (2)

Eva Avila

- Sass Jordan: "You just did something that people can only do when they're born with it" (1)
- Zack Werner: "No disrespect to Kalan, but he's no Eva Avila" (1)
- Zack Werner: "Dude, I don't rap, you shouldn't scat," (2)

Craig Sharpe:

- Jake Gold: "I just didn't feel like you got into the song." (1)
- Zack Werner: "Kickstart this thing, man. Be a star, dude" (1)
- Jake Gold: "At the end you brought it right home." (2)
- Sass Jordan: "That was an unbelievably lovely performance" (2)

==== Top 4 Performance Show ====
Craig Sharpe:

- Zack Werner: "The fact is that song totally fits your pipes and your vibe and if you won this thing and released it, it would go number one" (1)
- Farley Flex: "It was really easy to choose songs for you" (2)

Tyler Lewis:

- Zack Werner: "I was all ready to go 'he shoots, he scores,' but you came out really flat in the third period" (1)
- Zack Werner: "You scared some children under their beds." (2)

Chad Doucette: (Eliminated)

- Jake Gold: "You delivered it. You did exactly what we thought you would do with that song." (1)
- Farley Flex: "The most memorable voice on the show" (1)
- Sass Jordan: "I've got to say I was hurting a bit at the beginning, but you totally redeemed yourself with that moment at the end" (2)

Eva Avila:

- Farley Flex: "You gave us a vision of who you will be." (1)
- Jake Gold: "I thought vocally it was really good, but... it's an angry song, but you were smiling" (1)
- Zack Werner: "I say Canadian Idol: Eva Avila." (2)

==== Top 5 Performance Show ====
Eva Avila:

- Jake Gold: "I always wondered how you were going to do country and you took that song and made it Eva. You made it work"
- Sass Jordan: "You're just getting better and better"

Craig Sharpe:

- Farley Flex: "I think the biggest thing in that performance was the maturity you showed,"
- Zack Werner: "I felt it, but you have such a unique instrument, I want you to be as big and obnoxious as me. Or Jake."

Steffi D.: (Eliminated)

- Zack Werner: "It's very cornball... But I think people have to decide, as much as I love you, if you're the next Canadian Idol."

Tyler Lewis:

- Farley Flex: "I'm no Farley Pride but your kinfolk should be proud."

Chad Doucette:

- Zack Werner: "But to be honest, I didn't even remember I was here. I was just watching that, remembering how much I care for you from the beginning."

=== Song Themes ===
Each week, a song theme will be presented to the competitors. Each competitor must base their song choice on the theme of the week.

- July 17 - Canada Rocks! - Songs written & recorded by Canadian Artists.
- July 24 - The Rolling Stones
- July 31 - Music of The 1980s
- August 7 - Classic rock
- August 14 - Unplugged (Acoustic music)
- August 21 - Country music
- August 28 - Judges' Choice
- September 4 - Pop standards

=== Performers on results shows ===
Each week, a guest performer will appear on the results show to perform one song. The guests will be listed here.

- July 18 - Nelly Furtado singing "Promiscuous"
- July 25 - (No Performer)
- August 1 - Cyndi Lauper singing "Time After Time" and "Shine"
- August 8 - Dennis DeYoung & Roger Hodgson
- August 15 - Chantal Kreviazuk singing "In This Life" (accompanied by the Top 6) and "All I Can Do"
- August 22 - Martina McBride singing "I Can't Stop Loving You" (accompanied by the Top 5) and "Till I Can Make It On My Own"
- August 29 - Rex Goudie singing "Run"
- September 5 - Tony Bennett
- Finale- Melissa O'Neil, Nelly Furtado singing "Maneater", Canadian Idol Top 10

== Elimination Chart ==
Stage:		Semi-Finals			Finals								
Week:		6/28	7/5	7/12	7/18	7/25	8/1	8/8	8/15	8/22	8/29	9/5	9/17
Place	Contestant	Result											
1	Eva Avila						Bottom 3			Bottom 2			Winner
2	Craig Sharpe								Bottom 2				Runner-Up
3	Tyler Lewis										Bottom 2	Elim	
4	Chad Doucette						Bottom 2				Elim		
5	Steffi D	Bottom 3			Bottom 3	Bottom 3		Bottom 2	Bottom 3	Elim			
6	Ashley Coulter		Bottom 3		Bottom 2	Bottom 2			Elim				
7	Rob James	Bottom 3	Bottom 3					Elim					
8	Brandon Jones						Elim						
9	Sarah Loverock					Elim							
10	Kati Durst				Elim								
11-14	Sheldon Elter	Bottom 3	Bottom 3	Elim									
11-14	Keith Macpherson			Elim									
11-14	Ashley Coles		Bottom 3	Elim									
11-14	Nancy Silverman			Elim									
15-18	Chris Labelle		Elim										
15-18	Greg Neufeld		Elim										
15-18	Alisha Nauth		Elim										
15-18	Alyssa Klazek	Bottom 3	Elim										
19-22	Jeremy Koz	Elim											
19-22	Nathan Brown	Elim											
19-22	Anna-Belle Oliva	Elim											
19-22	Valérie Jalbert	Elim											
