= Luke McMaster =

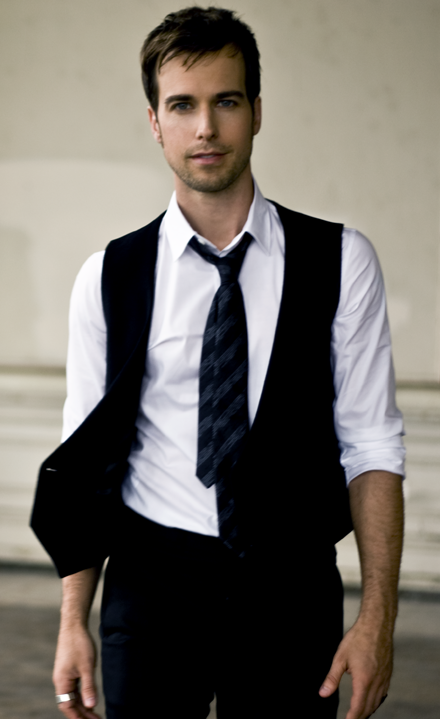

Background information
- Born: Luke Anthony McMaster; March 22, 1976 (age 50); Brandon, Manitoba, Canada
- Origin: Winnipeg, Manitoba, Canada
- Genres: Blue-Eyed Soul, Pop, R&B, Jazz
- Occupations: Singer, songwriter, musician, producer
- Instruments: Vocals, guitar, piano
- Years active: 1994–present
- Label: Universal
- Website: lukemcmaster.com

Luke McMaster (born March 22, 1976) is a Canadian singer, songwriter, recording artist and producer.

McMaster experienced early success as half of the music duo McMaster & James originating from Winnipeg, Manitoba, Canada. Named after McMaster and his performing partner, Rob James, the duo released a self-titled gold album and scored the radio hits "Love Wins Everytime", "Thank You," "I Understand", and "Sweet Sensation." Despite their initial success, the band dissolved in 2002.

Since then, McMaster has worked as a songwriter, producer, solo performing and recording artist living in Toronto, Ontario. As a solo artist and songwriter, he is best known for his 2013 hit "Good Morning, Beautiful," with Grammy-nominated American pianist Jim Brickman, which peaked on the US Billboard AC Radio charts at #3. He also has contributed songs to albums that have sold an estimated collective total of seven million units, including the 2006 three-million selling, multi-platinum A Girl Like Me, by Rihanna, the 2006 RIAA gold-certified Nick Lachey album What's Left Of Me, the 2004 Canadian double-platinum album 219 Days by Kalan Porter, the 2005 platinum Rex Goudie albums Under The Lights and Home, by premiere Canadian Idol winner Ryan Malcolm.

McMaster's latest project, Icons of Soul, is a new album and potential television documentary series that will feature his collaborations on new material with such iconic songwriters as Rock & Roll Hall Of Fame and Songwriter Hall of Fame members Felix Cavaliere (founder of The Rascals) and Motown legend Lamont Dozier of Holland-Dozier-Holland and is scheduled for release in 2018.

== Background and school years ==
McMaster was born in Brandon, Manitoba, Canada, to businesswoman Bev (née Canning) and university professor George McMaster. Luke is the second oldest of four sons, with brothers named Jeff, John and Rob. McMaster's first year of primary school took place in Sunnydale, California, as his family accompanied his father George while he attended a one-year sabbatical at Stanford University. Subsequently, the family returned to Manitoba where George McMaster headed up the School of Maths and Computer Science at Brandon University.

During his final years of high school, McMaster pursued his passion for music and taught himself to play the guitar. He also learned and developed his skills as a songwriter and lyricist. He knew that his family had high expectations for academic achievements for all of their boys so McMaster kept his musical ambitions and interests entirely secret from his family and friends.

In 1994, McMaster enrolled at Brandon University with a planned major in English Literature. Driven by a growing ambition to become a professional musician and performer, he left university after only two weeks. Luke then moved to Winnipeg, registered at the Winnipeg Contemporary Music College and began attending a two-year course.

== Early musical career ==
While studying at the Contemporary Music College, McMaster established a network of musicians and industry professionals who remain part of his professional circle.

=== Double Vision ===
During his tenure at Music College, Luke formed the band Double Vision with drummer/vocalist Sean Miller. Double Vision performed in Winnipeg cafés and public schools. Influenced by the Everly Brothers and Simon & Garfunkel, the band quickly became known for their tight two-part harmonies and catchy songs. In 1994, they booked time in a recording studio with local producer Dan Donahue and recorded their first self-titled EP. A toured followed, lasting several months. In mid-1995, Miller left the band to pursue a career as a pastor and McMaster continued on in music.

=== Two Face ===
In 1995, during his participation in a Winnipeg Song Writing Workshop, McMaster became acquainted with one of the presenters, Canadian songwriter, producer and artist manager Chris Burke-Gaffney. Impressed with Burke-Gaffney's credentials as a touring musician in his teens, his stint with The Pumps and, more recently, as manager of Juno Award-winning, triple-platinum artist Chantal Kreviazuk, McMaster approached Burke-Gaffney about working together. Soon after, Burke-Gaffney and McMaster began their professional relationship, which later included management.

While collaborating with Burke-Gaffney on the writing of their song "Thank You" at an early 1997 studio recording session, McMaster met Rob James. Together, McMaster and James wrote a new song named "Shouldn't Love You" and demoed it to a professional acquaintance, producer Glen Willows. With Willows' encouragement, McMaster and James decided to team up under the name Two Face, managed through Chris Burke-Gaffney's company, CBG Artist Development.

== McMaster & James ==
Inspired by a common interest in pop and R&B, McMaster and James developed, demoed and then recorded a number of new songs, agreeing that "Thank You" seemed to have the most potential. In 1999, McMaster & James signed a contract with ViK. Recordings, a Canadian label formed by BMG Music Canada, the domestic branch of BMG Records.

In February 2000, BMG released their self-titled debut that proceeded to go gold in Canada later that year. Supported by a number of cross-Canada tours, including an opening spots on Christina Aguilera's and NSYNC's Canadian tours, McMaster & James experienced success with the hits "Love Wins Everytime," "Thank You," "I Understand" and "Sweet Sensation," all of which were also well received by Canadian radio.

In 2001, "Thank You" was awarded a SOCAN Award for Top Radio Play, while "I Understand" won the Prairie Music Award (PMA) award for Best Song. In addition, McMaster & James won the fan-voted PMA for Entertainers of the Year. The album McMaster & James was also released in Ireland and South America.

In 2002, McMaster & James were developing a second album and sent to Philadelphia to work with producers André Harris and Vidal Davies (Dre & Vidal). Subsequently, the project was placed on hold. Later that year, as the Canadian music industry faced the challenges of the Napster era and related downloading phenomena, Luke McMaster and Rob James agreed to go their separate ways.

== Songwriting and production ==
In 2003, McMaster decided to take time off from performing to become a full-time songwriter and producer, writing for artists as well as TV and movies. That same year, he received an invitation to attend the Canadian Idol songwriting camp in Toronto.

=== Canadian Idol songwriting camp ===
Of the 110 songs written during the 2003 Canadian Idol writing camp, only 13 of them made the final cut, six of them bearing the co-writing stamp of McMaster.

At the camp, McMaster found opportunity to collaborate with many songwriters, including legendary Guess Who co-founder and Bachman-Turner Overdrive founder Randy Bachman, Xandy Barry, Rob Wells, as well as Swedish songwriting team Franciz & LePont, best known for their Backstreet Boys contributions.

One song, "October Skies," written with Bobby Cameron and Jenna Gawne landed on the debut CD by Canadian Idol competition winner Ryan Malcolm. McMaster and Cameron were recruited by BMG Canada to produce the song for Malcolm at Phase One Studios in Toronto prior to its December release.

Subsequently, McMaster also partnered with "Black Velvet" songwriter Christopher Ward, Wells and Chris Anderson to write material for Nick Carter's (Backstreet Boys) solo album. Luke also worked on writing and production for future Canadian Idol winners Eva Avila ( he co-wrote the single "Damned," and Theo Tams and 2005 runner-up Rex Goudie.

=== Universal Music Publishing Group Canada ===
Since signing to Universal Music Publishing Group (UMPG) Canada in 2004 as a songwriter, McMaster's melodic and lyrical contributions have adorned such multi-platinum, gold albums and other projects by Rihanna, Nick Lachey, Kyle Riabko, Rex Goudie, Kalan Porter, Eva Avila, Theo Tams and Marc Jordan.

In early 2008, McMaster co-wrote "Let's Start From Here" with Vincent Degiorgio and Damhnait Doyle, for American-born, bilingual Taiwanese singer and songwriter Joanna Wang. "Start From Here", released in both English and Chinese, reached # 1 in Taiwan and has been popular throughout the Southeast Asian region, including Japan, with its corresponding album Start Here selling more than 200,000 copies.

The association with UMPG Canada ended in 2012. McMaster is now self-published under Ekul Music Inc.

=== Instant Star and Degrassi TV and film projects ===
Instant Star was a Canadian television program which aired from September 2004 to June 2008, chronicling the recording industry experiences of a character named Jude Harrison, the adolescent winner of a music competition, played by Alexz Johnson. The co-founding brainchild of the Degrassi franchise and sole creator of Instant Star - Linda Schuyler - contracted McMaster as songwriter, composer and producer to its production company over its four-year lifespan, contributing to the creation of more than 60 original compositions. In the process, McMaster was not only reunited with a number of previous collaborators including Chris Burke-Gaffney, but also developed working relationships with such notable artists and composers as Marc Jordan, Christopher Ward, Damhnait Doyle, Rob Wells, Shelly Peiken (with whom he wrote "Ultraviolet") and Greg Johnston.

Concurrently from 2005 to 2008, McMaster impressed Schuyler enough to contribute music to her internationally popular Canadian television shows Degrassi: The Next Generation (airing throughout Canada and the U.S.) and a further three songs to the 2009 Canadian feature film Degrassi Goes Hollywood. A sequel, Degrassi Takes Manhattan featured four more McMaster co-writes, including the single "Life is a Show."

=== "Song for Africa" ===
In the spring of 2006, McMaster joined Rob Wells, Simon Wilcox and producer Darcy Ataman to record "Song For Africa", a music single that premiered at the XVI International AIDS Conference in Toronto held on August 13 that year in front of 30,000 delegates. That fall, the Song For Africa organization was formalized as an international non-profit organization.

Four years later, McMaster collaborated with Brett Rosenberg and Christopher Ward to write the song "Carry You," contributing to Song for Africa - Rwanda: Rises Up!, a fundraising album produced by Song for Africa.

=== Marc Jordan 9-11 Tribute "Falling Man" collaboration ===
In 2010, McMaster collaborated with American singer Marc Jordan in the development of Jordan's latest album, Crucifix in Dreamland. McMaster co-wrote the album's Top 40 hit single remembering the 9-11 tragedy, "Falling Man" and sang on the track.

=== Sound of Freedom Project ===
In 2012, "Diamonds From Drops of Rain," a previously written tune by McMaster was selected as the lead single for the Sound Of Freedom Project released on May 29, 2012, through Willow Music and EMI Music Canada, proceeds from the album were earmarked for the Support Our Troops Fund and features a unique collaboration between musician members of the Canadian Forces, and civilian singers featuring Canadian-Danish crossover opera star Alexandria Beck, Alan Frew, Mark Masri, Luke McMaster, and Annie Villeneuve. The band is appropriately titled March On! Produced by Glass Tiger keyboardist and songwriter Sam Reid, Sound of Freedom was recorded largely at the Canadian Forces Central Band Studio in Ottawa and at Newmarket, Ontario's SlipOne Digital during 2010 and 2011.

== Notable performances ==
=== Team Canada 2010 ===
During February 2010, McMaster was a member of Team Canada 2010, a troupe of performers, musicians and NHL hockey stars sent to Kandahar, Afghanistan, to entertain the Canadian troops. Alongside Canadian Bands, The Carpet Frogs and Default, and performers such as Alan Frew and Sam Reid from Glass Tiger, McMaster performed and sang in various concerts and events organized for the troops over a week long period.

=== Canada's Walk of Fame Festival 2010 ===
In 2010, McMaster performed at the annual Toronto-based festival in October to commemorate the latest induction of Canadian celebrities into the Canadian Walk of Fame. Along with a select showcase of Canadian musicians and icons, McMaster performed and sang on the Dundas Square stage in a nationally televised concert that was broadcast the following night.

=== Tourism Ontario 2010 ===
As part of the Province of Ontario's initiative to celebrate and promote the Vancouver-hosted 2010 Winter Olympics, the Ontario Government, through its Department of Tourism, commissioned McMaster to co-star in national 60-second television commercial called "Come Together", also featuring Ryan Isojima, Lisa Boudreau, Annick Obonsawin, and PHATT AL of God Made Me Funky.

=== Performances ===
In October 2010, McMaster opened for the American country-indie-folk singer Brandi Carlile at Koerner Hall at the Royal Conservatory of Music in downtown Toronto, Ontario.

== Solo career ==
=== All Roads (2013) ===
Building upon several years' experience as a full-time writer/producer, McMaster began work on a project in 2011 to relaunch his performing career. Recording the album All Roads at the new Revolution Studios in Toronto in January 2012, McMaster finished eight cover songs and four original tracks with Greg Johnston at the production helm. Released on Valentine's Day, February 14, 2013, the album featured his biggest hit, "Good Morning Beautiful", co-written and recorded with American songwriter and pianist Jim Brickman.

But Brickman wasn't McMaster's only special guest on the album: during its post production, McMaster enlisted famed Canadian guitarist Pavlo to perform on the album original "Tuscan Skies." In light of that collaboration, Pavlo invited Luke to accompany him on the western swing of his Canadian Tour in April, performing at 12 venues. In turn, McMaster packaged a limited edition Tuscan Skies five-track EP, included the feature song and four select covers, selling them exclusively off stage during the Pavlo dates.

==== "Good Morning Beautiful" (single) ====
In October 2013, "Good Morning, Beautiful" debuted on US Billboard AC Radio charts at position #32. By the second week of December, it was charting at #3 and remained there for two weeks. The track proved so popular that a Christmas version of the track, entitled "Merry Christmas, Beautiful," charted #6 over the holiday season.

=== The Heart of Soul (2014) ===
McMaster released his second full solo album, The Heart Of Soul, through Greenhill/UMG. The 12-track album consisted of cover songs and further entrenched the singer to the "blue-eyed soul" crowd, with a few Motown nuggets thrown into the mix.

=== Trending (2016) ===
Trending was released on April 29, 2016. The single "M2M" was released on May 27. McMaster also recorded a song with singer Stacey Kay on the album called Hurts So Good.

=== Icons Of Soul (2018) ===
Luke McMaster and his co-writing partner Arun Chaturvedi are in the midst of the Icons of Soul, a new album that will feature iconic songwriters such as The Rascals founder Felix Cavaliere and Motown workhorse Lamont Dozier of Holland-Dozier-Holland fame collaborating with the duo on new music as well as classic covers. The idea is also being pitched as a documentary television series, with the Cavaliere and Dozier segments already taped, with McMaster hoping to include two or three more icons before he issues the project later in 2018.

== Singles ==
| Year | Title | Chart Positions | Album |
|---|---|---|---|
| 2013 | "Good Morning Beautiful" | # 3 US AC | All Roads |
| 2014 | "Raise a Glass (It's Christmas Time)" | #7 CAN All Stations | n/a |

== Awards ==
- RIAA Double Platinum, Music Canada Double Platinum, Rihanna, A Girl Like Me
- RIAA Gold, Nick Lachey, What's Left of Me
- Music Canada Double Platinum, Kalan Porter. 219 days
- Music Canada Platinum, Rex Goudie, Under the Lights
- Music Canada Platinum, Ryan Malcolm, Home
- Music Canada Gold, McMaster & James, McMaster & James
- SOCAN award for Top Radio Play: "Thank You"
- PMA award for Best Song: "I Understand"
- BellMedia Emerging Artist in 2012, in conjunction with "Good Morning Beautiful" which was released to radio the previous month.

== Discography ==
- Time (EP) (2008)
- All Roads (2013)
- The Heart of Soul (2014)
- Trending (2016)
- Icons of Soul (2018)
