= List of number-one singles of 2006 (Canada) =

The following lists the number one best-selling singles in Canada in 2006 which was published in Billboard magazine under the Hits of the World section. During January and February of that year, only songs released as physical singles qualified for this chart. During this period, the singles market in Canada was very limited in both scope and availability and, in many cases, these songs received little or no radio support. For tracks other than those by American Idol or Canadian Idol winners, sales were likely to be less than 1,000 per week.

Starting in March, however, Nielsen Entertainment Canada created the Canadian Digital Songs Chart, which tracked sales of digital music downloads, and Billboard stopped publishing the Canadian Singles Chart in favor of the new chart. Despite this, the physical singles chart continued to be published on Jam!.

These two singles charts were the only ones Canadians had until June 2007, when the Canadian Hot 100 was released to the public. Both also list other big hits in the sales chart.

Billboard publishes charts with an issue date approximately 7–10 days in advance.

== Chart history ==
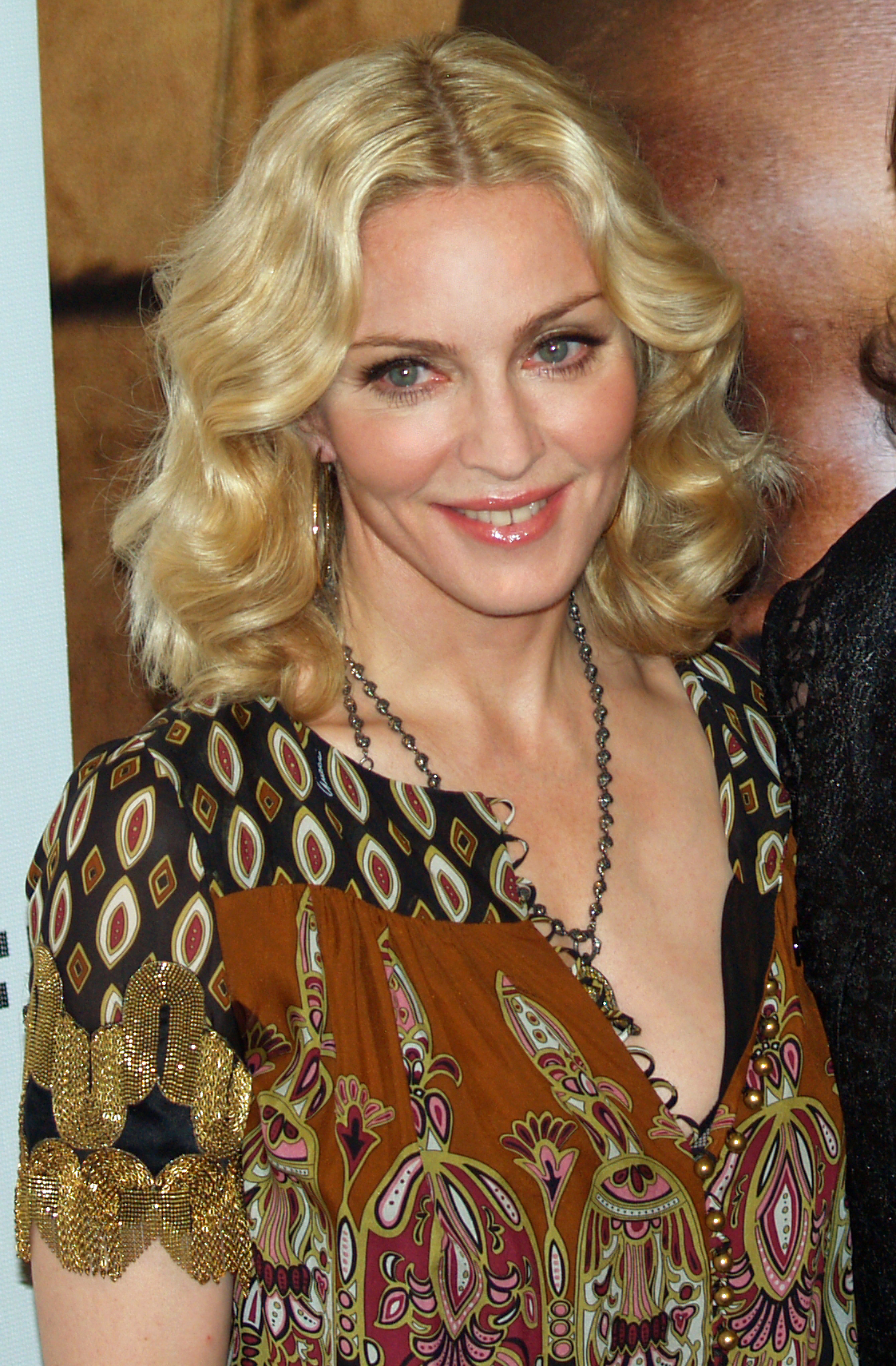
Madonna's "Hung Up" spent 12 weeks at number-one in early 2006.

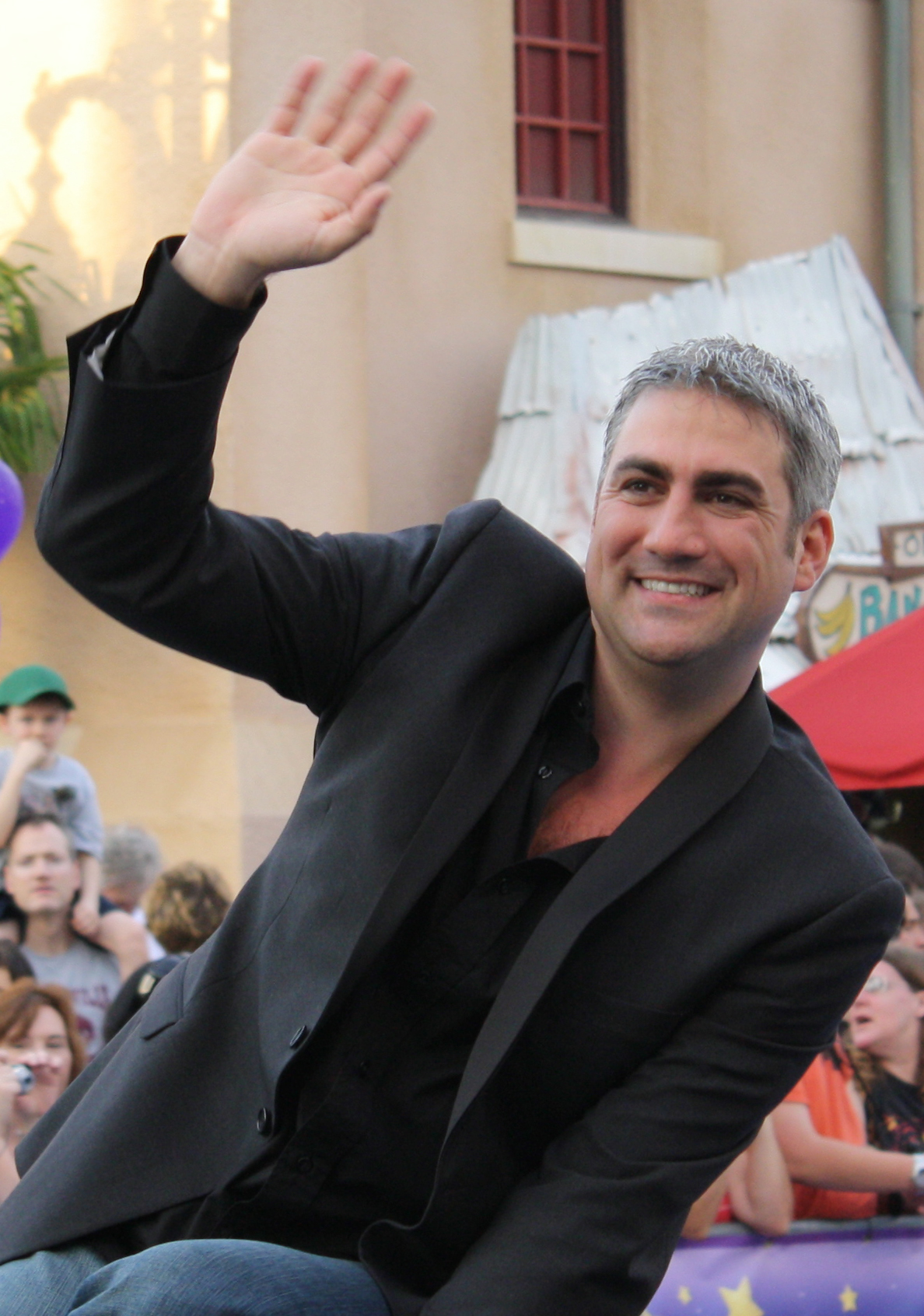
Taylor Hicks' "Do I Make You Proud" spent about 17 weeks at number-one, his only number-one peaking song in Canada, and the longest number-one song of 2006.

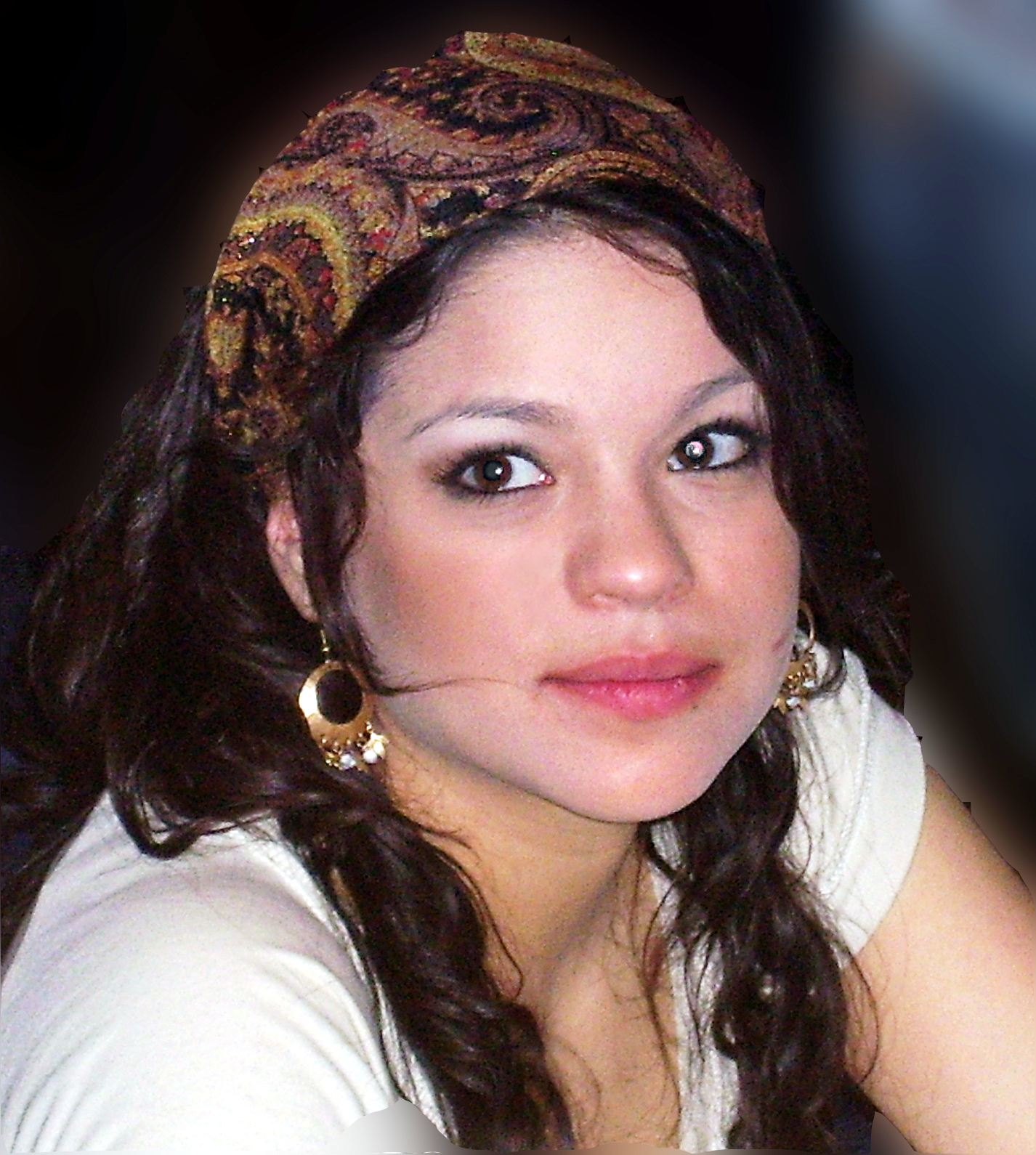
Eva Avila's "Meant to Fly" was number-one for about 9 non-consecutive weeks, her only number-one single in Canada.

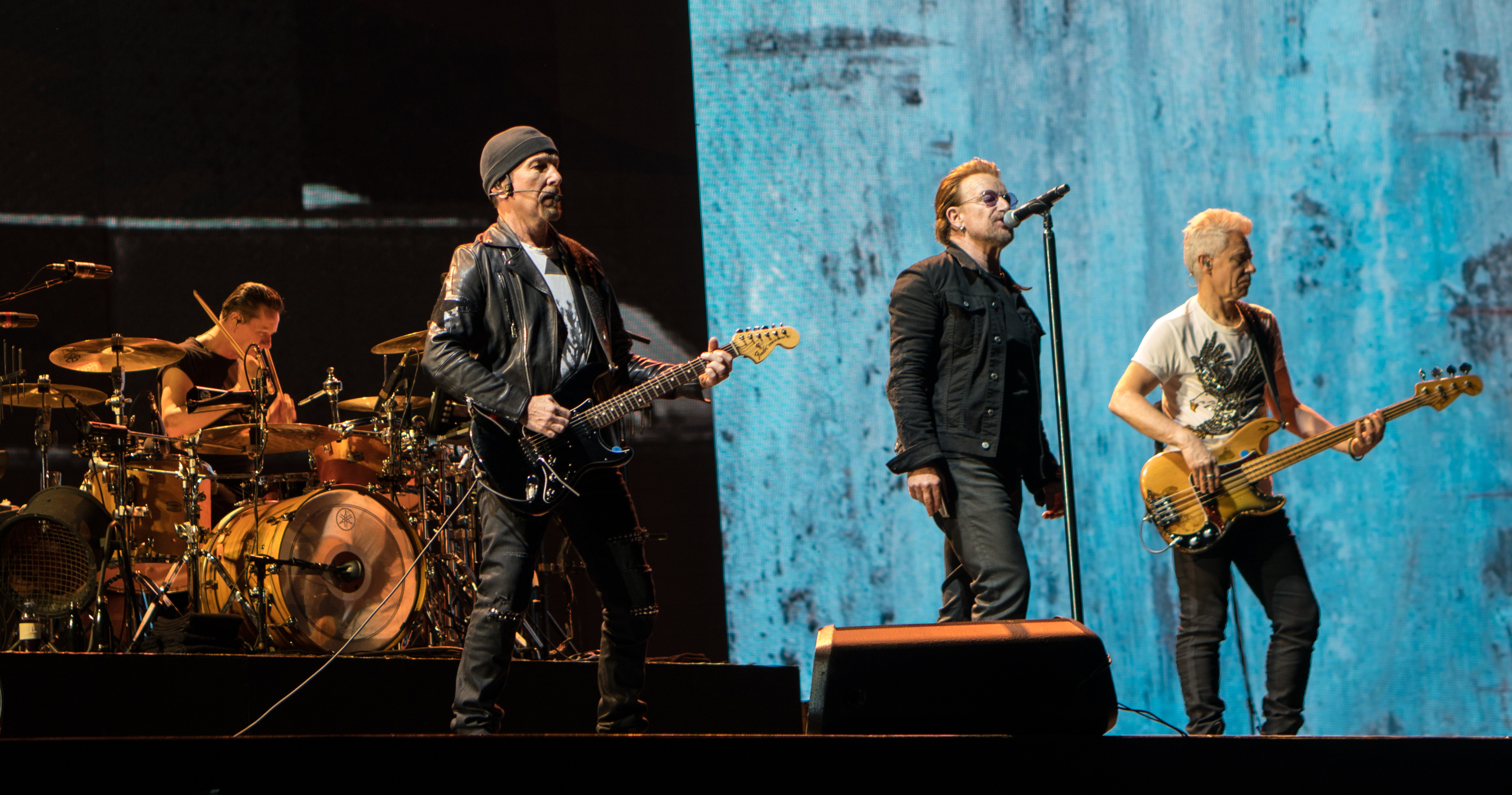
U2 earned their fourteenth number-one in Canada with "The Saints Are Coming".

Physical singles (Note: Due to Billboard switching to the Canadian Digital Songs Chart from March onwards and canoe.ca being currently excluded from the Wayback Machine, it is currently impossible to find references for every single week for these particular songs. Nevertheless, archive.today archives of canoe.ca and two third-party sites include most of these number-one singles and should paint an approximate picture of this chart.)
Issue date	Title	Artist(s)	Ref.
January 7	"Alive"	Melissa O'Neill (Canada)	
January 14	"Hung Up"	Madonna	
January 21	"Hung Up"	Madonna	
January 28	"Hung Up"	Madonna	
February 4	"Hung Up"	Madonna	
February 11	"Hung Up"	Madonna	
February 18	"Hung Up"	Madonna	
February 25	"Hung Up"	Madonna	
March 4	"Hung Up"	Madonna	
March 11	"Hung Up"	Madonna	
March 18	"Hung Up"	Madonna	
March 25	"Hung Up"	Madonna	
April 1	"Hung Up"	Madonna	
April 8	"Every Day Is Exactly the Same"	Nine Inch Nails	
April 15	"Every Day Is Exactly the Same"	Nine Inch Nails	
April 22	"Every Day Is Exactly the Same"	Nine Inch Nails	
April 29	"Every Day Is Exactly the Same"	Nine Inch Nails	(Note: The reference erroneously states that "Brainstorm" by Arctic Monkeys is #1 on this particular week. This is impossible as not only was that song released in 2007, but it was also recorded in December 2006. Unfortunately, this is currently the only available reference for this particular week due to the aforementioned Wayback Machine exclusion of canoe.ca.)
May 6	"Every Day Is Exactly the Same"	Nine Inch Nails	
May 13	"Every Day Is Exactly the Same"	Nine Inch Nails	
May 20	"Every Day Is Exactly the Same"	Nine Inch Nails	
May 27	"SOS"	Rihanna	
June 3	"Promiscuous"	Nelly Furtado (Canada) featuring Timbaland	
June 10	"Do I Make You Proud"	Taylor Hicks	
June 17	"Do I Make You Proud"	Taylor Hicks	
June 24	"Do I Make You Proud"	Taylor Hicks	
July 1	"Do I Make You Proud"	Taylor Hicks	
July 8	"Do I Make You Proud"	Taylor Hicks	
July 15	"Do I Make You Proud"	Taylor Hicks	
July 22	"Do I Make You Proud"	Taylor Hicks	
July 29	"Do I Make You Proud"	Taylor Hicks	
August 5	"Do I Make You Proud"	Taylor Hicks	
August 12	"Do I Make You Proud"	Taylor Hicks	
August 19	"Do I Make You Proud"	Taylor Hicks	
August 26	"Do I Make You Proud"	Taylor Hicks	
September 2	"Do I Make You Proud"	Taylor Hicks	
September 9	"Do I Make You Proud"	Taylor Hicks	
September 16	"Do I Make You Proud"	Taylor Hicks	
September 23	"Do I Make You Proud"	Taylor Hicks	
September 30	"Do I Make You Proud"	Taylor Hicks	
October 7	"Meant to Fly"	Eva Avila (Canada)	
October 14	"Meant to Fly"	Eva Avila (Canada)	
October 21	"Meant to Fly"	Eva Avila (Canada)	
October 28	"Meant to Fly"	Eva Avila (Canada)	
November 4	"Meant to Fly"	Eva Avila (Canada)	
November 11	"Meant to Fly"	Eva Avila (Canada)	
November 18	"Meant to Fly"	Eva Avila (Canada)	
November 25	"The Saints Are Coming"	U2 and Green Day	
December 2	"The Saints Are Coming"	U2 and Green Day	
December 9	"The Saints Are Coming"	U2 and Green Day	
December 16	"The Saints Are Coming"	U2 and Green Day	
December 23	"Meant to Fly"	Eva Avila (Canada)	
December 30	"Meant to Fly"	Eva Avila (Canada)	

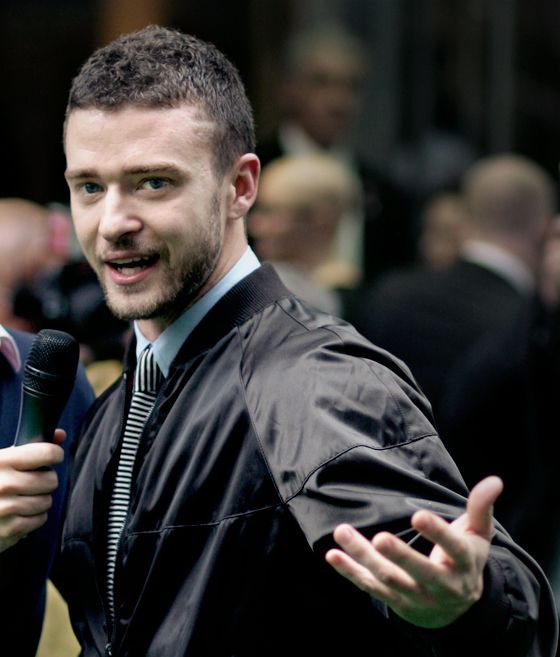
Justin Timberlake's "SexyBack" became his first solo number-one away from NSYNC.

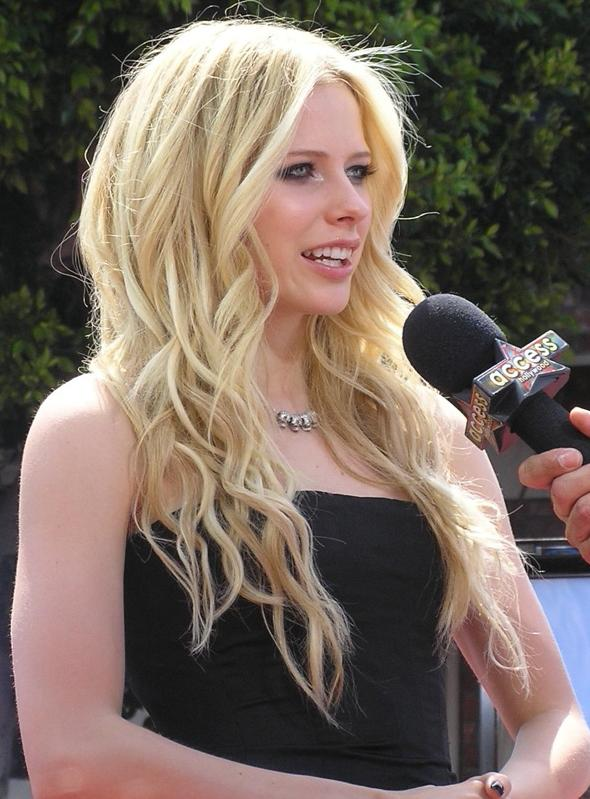
Native singer Avril Lavigne obtained her first number-one in 2006, "Keep Holding On".

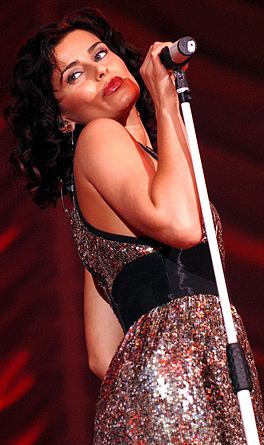
Nelly Furtado reached number-one twice in 2006 with "Promiscuous" and "Say It Right".

Digital singles
Issue date	Title	Artist(s)	Ref.
March 4	"You're Beautiful"	James Blunt	
March 11	"You're Beautiful"	James Blunt	
March 18	"You're Beautiful"	James Blunt	
March 25	"You're Beautiful"	James Blunt	
April 1	"You're Beautiful"	James Blunt	
April 8	"You're Beautiful"	James Blunt	
April 15	"You're Beautiful"	James Blunt	
April 22	"You're Beautiful"	James Blunt	
April 29	"Dani California"	Red Hot Chili Peppers	
May 6	"Dani California"	Red Hot Chili Peppers	
May 13	"SOS"	Rihanna	
May 20	"Hips Don't Lie"	Shakira featuring Wyclef Jean	
May 27	"Hips Don't Lie"	Shakira featuring Wyclef Jean	
June 3	"Hips Don't Lie"	Shakira featuring Wyclef Jean	
June 10	"Hips Don't Lie"	Shakira featuring Wyclef Jean	
June 17	"Promiscuous"	Nelly Furtado (Canada) featuring Timbaland	
June 24	"Promiscuous"	Nelly Furtado (Canada) featuring Timbaland	
July 1	"Promiscuous"	Nelly Furtado (Canada) featuring Timbaland	
July 8	"Promiscuous"	Nelly Furtado (Canada) featuring Timbaland	
July 15	"Promiscuous"	Nelly Furtado (Canada) featuring Timbaland	
July 22	"Promiscuous"	Nelly Furtado (Canada) featuring Timbaland	
July 29	"Promiscuous"	Nelly Furtado (Canada) featuring Timbaland	
August 5	"Promiscuous"	Nelly Furtado (Canada) featuring Timbaland	
August 12	"Crazy"	Gnarls Barkley	
August 19	"SexyBack"	Justin Timberlake	
August 26	"SexyBack"	Justin Timberlake	
September 2	"SexyBack"	Justin Timberlake	
September 9	"SexyBack"	Justin Timberlake	
September 16	"SexyBack"	Justin Timberlake	
September 23	"SexyBack"	Justin Timberlake	
September 30	"SexyBack"	Justin Timberlake	
October 7	"SexyBack"	Justin Timberlake	
October 14	"Be Yourself and 5 Other Cliches"	Rock Star Supernova	
October 21	"Chasing Cars"	Snow Patrol	
October 28	"Chasing Cars"	Snow Patrol	
November 4	"Chasing Cars"	Snow Patrol	
November 11	"Chasing Cars"	Snow Patrol	
November 18	"Chasing Cars"	Snow Patrol	
November 25	"Chasing Cars"	Snow Patrol	
December 2	"The Saints Are Coming"	U2 and Green Day	
December 9	"The Saints Are Coming"	U2 and Green Day	
December 16	"Keep Holding On"	Avril Lavigne (Canada)	
December 23	"Wind It Up"	Gwen Stefani	
December 30	"Say It Right"	Nelly Furtado (Canada) featuring Timbaland	
