= Fallin' for You =

Fallin' for You may refer to:

- "Fallin' for You" (Colbie Caillat song), 2009
- "Fallin' for You" (Eva Avila song)
- "Fallin' for You", a song by Dierks Bentley from Up on the Ridge
- "Fallin' for You", a song by Heather Headley from This Is Who I Am

== See also ==
- Fallen For You (foaled 2009), a British Thoroughbred racehorse and broodmare
- Falling for You (disambiguation)
- Fall for You (disambiguation)
