= Falling for You =

Falling for You may refer to:

== Film and television ==
- Falling for You (film), a 1933 British comedy film directed by Robert Stevenson and Jack Hulbert
- Falling for You, a 1995 TV film starring Jennie Garth

== Music ==
=== Falling for You ===
- "Falling for You" (Cliff Richard song), a song by Cliff Richard from his 2020 album Music... The Air That I Breathe
- "Falling for You" (Weezer song), a song by Weezer from their 1996 album Pinkerton
- "Falling for You", a 2020 Jaden Smith song featuring Justin Bieber from CTV3: Cool Tape Vol. 3
- "Falling for You", a song by Busted from the 2004 album Busted
- "Falling for You", a song by The Cheetah Girls from their 2007 live album In Concert: The Party's Just Begun Tour
- "Falling for You", a song by Sister2Sister, a B-side from the single "What's a Girl to Do?"
- "Falling for You", a song by Skin song from her 2006 album Fake Chemical State
- "Falling for You", a song by Student Rick
- "Falling for You", a song by Tamia from their 1998 album Tamia
- "Falling for You", a song by Victoria Silvstedt from her 1999 album Girl on the Run

=== Falling for U ===
- "Falling for U", a song by Wanessa Camargo

=== Fallin' for You ===
- "Fallin' for You" (Colbie Caillat song), a song by Colbie Caillat from her 2009 album Breakthrough
- "Fallin' for You" (Eva Avila song), a song by Eva Avila from her 2006 album Somewhere Else
- "Fallin' for You", a song by Heather Headley from her album This Is Who I Am

== See also ==
- Falling You, an American ambient/electronic project based in San Francisco, California, United States
- Falling into You, an English-language studio album by Canadian singer Celine Dion
- "Falling Over You", a 1989 single by Australian folk rock group The Triffids
- Fall for You (disambiguation)
- Fallin' for You (disambiguation)
- Falling (disambiguation)
