= Theo Tams =

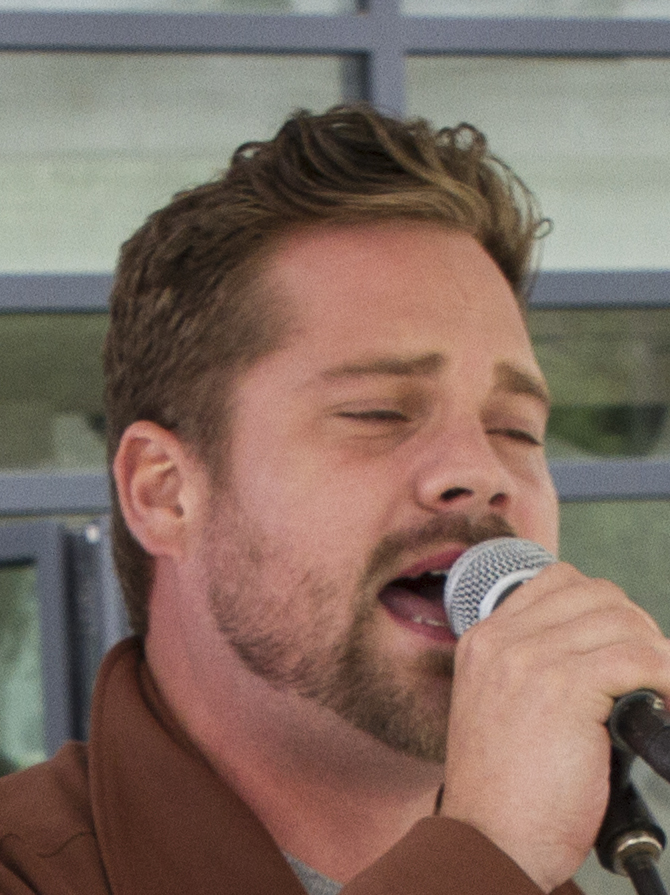
- Tams in 2018

Background information
- Born: Theo Tyson Tams; 12 July 1985 (age 41); Lethbridge, Alberta, Canada
- Origin: Coaldale, Alberta, Canada
- Genre: Pop
- Occupation: Singer-songwriter
- Instruments: Piano; Vocals; Keyboard
- Years active: 2005–present
- Labels: Sony (2008–present) d / d artist management (2010–present); Warner Music Canada (2014–present)
- Website: theotams.com

Theo Tyson Tams (born 12 July 1985) is a Canadian singer and the winner of the sixth season of the CTV reality show Canadian Idol. His debut album, Give It All Away, was released on 19 May 2009 by Sony Music Canada.

== Early life ==
Tams grew up in Coaldale, Alberta, and he attended Immanuel Christian High School in Lethbridge. Tams played trumpet in high school, and is self-taught on piano. Before Idol, he was a student at the University of Lethbridge, studying classical music and psychology. He is taking a leave from his studies to pursue a music career.

Tams released the EP Unexpected in 2005.

== Canadian Idol ==
At his audition for Canadian Idol in February 2008, Tams drew laughs from the judges as he demonstrated evidence of his anxiety-related perspiration, having soaked through his shirt.

Tams most often performed while playing piano. His performances included "Apologize" by OneRepublic, "Collide" by Howie Day, Bob Marley's "No Woman, No Cry", and Jann Arden's "Good Mother". Idol judge Zack Werner described Tams' performance of Bryan Adams' "Heaven" as "one of the top two or three performances in the history of the show."

He won Canadian Idol on 10 September 2008, after singing three songs on the final performance show that included "Sing" (released to radio and digital download on 11 September 2008), which was the winner's single chosen for him. The runner-up, Nova Scotia carpenter Mitch MacDonald, performed a different song as his own potential winner's single, the first time this has been done on Canadian Idol.

Although the Idol winner's first album usually is released about two months after the show's finale, Tams had much longer to prepare his. Tams said he appreciated the longer time, and hoped to have some songs he wrote himself included on the album.

=== Performances and results ===
Week	Theme	Mentor	Song	Artist	Result
Top 24	Semi-final Group 2		"Apologize"	OneRepublic/ Timbaland	Safe
Top 20	Semi-final Group 2		"Collide"	Howie Day	Safe
Top 16	Semi-final Group 1		"Bubbly"	Colbie Caillat	Safe
Top 10	Songs of David Bowie		"Silly Boy Blue"	David Bowie	Safe
Top 9	Hits of Dead Artists		"No Woman, No Cry"	Bob Marley & The Wailers	Safe
Top 8	Unplugged Music Week	Gavin Rossdale	"Weak in the Knees"	Serena Ryder	Safe
Top 7	Top 10 UK Hits	Tom Jones	"You Had Me"	Joss Stone	Bottom 3
Top 6	Canada Rock(s)	Simple Plan	"Sweet Ones"	Sarah Slean	Safe
Top 5	Judges' Theme; The Beatles		"The Long and Winding Road"	The Beatles	Safe
Top 4	Anne Murray's Music; Idol's Choice	Anne Murray	"You Don't Know Me" "Chariot"	Anne Murray; Gavin DeGraw	Safe
Top 3	Songs of Bryan Adams	Bryan Adams	"Heaven" "When You're Gone"	Bryan Adams	Safe
Top 2	Idol's Choice; Idol Single; Judges' Choice	John Legend; Hedley	"Good Mother" "Sing" "I Wanna Know What Love Is"	Jann Arden; Theo Tams; Foreigner	WINNER

=== Post-Idol ===
Tams moved to Toronto to work on collaborations for his debut album. Tams toured Canada along with runner-up Mitch MacDonald and third-place finisher Drew Wright in November–December 2008.

== Career ==
=== Christmas Dream (2008) ===
Tams released the single "Christmas Dream", a song he cowrote with Luke McMaster, Simon Wilcox and Greg Johnston. The B-side of the single is a cover of "Christmas (Baby Please Come Home)", and all proceeds are being donated to the charity Free the Children. It peaked at No. 69 on the Canadian Hot 100.

Tams also performed with Eva Avila and David Archuleta for Toronto's CHUM FM's annual Christmas Wish Breakfast.

=== Give It All Away (2009–2010) ===
On 17 March 2009, his first single from his album was released, "Lazy Lovers", written by Tams, Hawksley Workman, and Greg Johnston.

His debut album, Give It All Away, was released on 19 May 2009. It features seven songs he co-wrote, which is more than any previous "Idol". Writing collaborators on the album include Simon Wilcox, Hawksley Workman, Sarah Slean, and Damhnait Doyle. A cross-Canada tour is planned for September.

Tams released a charity Christmas single alongside Ali Slaight called "Do You Hear What I Hear." This song went to No. 1 on the Canadian AC Chart.

Tams's next single is "Manhattan Blue." The music video for the song was released 28 May 2010. The video features So You Think You Can Dance Canada second season winner Tara-Jean Popowich and Vincent Desjardins. The video premiered on ET Canada on 17 June 2010.

In April 2010, Tams sought out a new management and business team to handle his career, as he moved forward with future albums.

Tams headlined a 15 date cross-Canada tour with special guests StereoGoesStellar, which started 7 August 2010 and met with much critical acclaim as he toured smaller more intimate venues playing in an up close and personal presentation of his songs solo on piano.

=== Second studio album (2011–present) ===
Tams explains that his second album, which will be released in 2011 will be a real "artist" album in so far as it will showcase just exactly who he is and what he stands for as a singer-songwriter. It will dig deeper emotionally than his debut album and represent almost a "song diary" that comes from a mixture of his life experiences since "Give It All Away" and from other parts of his life before his Idol experience. One of his new songs focuses on his experience in Afghanistan. Theo has already begun the intense writing process with one of his heroes, who will also be producing the record. It is expected that the project will be formally announced towards the end of January 2011 and the production team named.

On 28 September, Tams released his third EP, Call The Doctor, through Hidden Pony Records. The release was noted by several critics as a significant artistic development, with reviewers highlighting its exploration of personal themes such as relationship dynamics, the experience of coming out to a Christian family, and the emotional aftermath of a past relationship.

In 2024 Tams organized The Rainbow Collective, a group of Canadian LGBTQ musicians who recorded the charity single "This Little Light" to benefit The 519. Participating musicians included Amanda Rheaume, BAYLA, Billy Newton-Davis, Bryn, Chrisy Hurn, Erica Fox, Iskwē, Jeffery Straker, Kayla Diamond, memyself&vi, Micah Barnes, Priyanka, Ralph, Raymond Salgado, Ryland James, Sebastian Gaskin, Steven Taetz, T. Thomason, Tafari Anthony, Your Hunni and Zenon.

== Personal life ==
Tams came out as gay during the show's run by referring to a male partner during one of his post-performance interviews. This made him the first openly gay performer to win an Idol series in North America. He subsequently endorsed Adam Lambert in the 2009 edition of American Idol, and included two gay couples, one male and one female, in the video for his single "Lazy Lovers."

On 28 June 2010, Tams took a trip to Afghanistan to perform for the Canadian troops on Canada Day. This was an opportunity for him to visit Canadian and allied troops not only on the base in Kandahar but he travelled by Blackhawk outside of the wire to meet with and hear the stories of the front-line troops. On 14 July, he told Canada AM that it was "the most surreal experiences I've ever had."

== Discography ==
=== Studio albums ===
Year	Album	Peak
Year	Album	CAN
2009	Give It All Away: Released: May 19, 2009; Label: Sony Music Canada; Format: CD, digital download	29
2014	Back Pocket: Released: September 16, 2014; Label: Slaight Music	—
2018	Call The Doctor: Released: September 28, 2018; Label: Hidden Pony Records	—
"—" denotes the album didn't chart.

=== Extended plays ===
Year	Album
2005	Unexpected: Released: 2005; Label: Independent; Format: EP, self released
2008	Christmas Dream: Released: November 25, 2008; Label: Sony Music Canada

== Singles ==
Year	Single	Peak positions		Album
Year	Single	CAN	CAN AC	Album
2008	"Sing"	12	—	Give It All Away
2008	"Christmas Dream"	69	—	Christmas Dream
2008	"Christmas (Baby Please Come Home)"	—	43	Christmas Dream
2009	"Lazy Lovers"	88	8	Give It All Away
2009	"Wait for You"	—	14	Give It All Away
2009	"Do You Hear What I Hear?" (Feat. Ali Slaight)	63	1	Charity single
2010	"Manhattan Blue"	—	—	Give It All Away
2011	"Mayday" (Feat. Ali Slaight)	—	—	—N/a
2012	"Where Are You Christmas" (Feat. Ali Slaight)	—	—	—N/a
"—" denotes releases that did not chart

== Music videos ==
Year	Single	Album
2009	"Lazy Lovers"	Give It All Away
2009	"Wait For You"	Give It All Away
2010	"Manhattan Blue"	Give It All Away

== Awards and nominations ==
Year	Presenter	Award	Result
2009	Gemini Awards	Best Performance or Host in a Variety Program or Series (Canadian Idol Top 6 Show – "Sweet Ones" performance)	Nominated
2010	Canadian Radio Music Awards	Mainstream AC Artist	Nominated

== Tours ==
- 2008: Canadian Idols LIVE! Tour 2008
- 2009: Give It All Away Tour
- 2010: Taking It All Back Tour : 2010 w/sg StereoGoesStellar

== See also ==
- Canadian rock
- Music of Canada
