= Sing (Theo Tams song) =

Single by Theo Tams
- Released: September 11, 2008
- Recorded: September 2008
- Genre: Pop
- Length: 4:22
- Label: Sony BMG
- Songwriters: Rob Wells, Xandy Barry
- Producer: Gavin Brown

Theo Tams singles chronology
"Sing" (2008)	"Christmas Dream" (2008)

"Sing" is the debut single by Theo Tams, the winner of season 6 of Canadian Idol.

== Background ==
The song was written by Rob Wells (who has also written songs for Melissa O'Neil, Nick Lachey, Backstreet Boys, and Eva Avila) and Xandy Barry. The single was produced by Gavin Brown.

== Release ==
It was released for digital downloads on September 11, 2008, and then the next week it made a "Hot Shot Debut" at number 12 on the Canadian Hot 100 chart due to digital downloads.

The track is included as a bonus track on Tams' 2009 album debut, Give It All Away.

== Reception ==
Chart (2008)	Peak position
Canadian Hot 100	12
Hot Canadian Digital Singles	9
