= Alphabet soup =

Alphabet soup may refer to:

- A common dish made from alphabet pasta
- Alphabet soup (linguistics), a metaphor for an abundance of abbreviations or acronyms
- Alphabet Soup (ultimate frisbee), a mixed European ultimate frisbee team
- Alphabet Soup (horse) (born 1991), racehorse
- Alphabet Soup (TV series), a television series
- Alphabet Soup Children's Entertainment, a Canadian children's band
- "Alphabet Soup", a song by Bell X1 from Music in Mouth
- "Alphabet Soup!" (Barney & Friends), an episode of Barney & Friends
- Alphabet agencies, created as part of former U.S. president Franklin Roosevelt's New Deal
