= I Owe It All to You =

"I Owe It All To You"

Single by Eva Avila

from the album Somewhere Else
- Released: 2006
- Recorded: October 2006
- Genre: Pop
- Length: 2:52
- Label: Sony BMG Canada
- Songwriters: Alonzo, Jim Guthrie, Adam Messinger, Damhnait Doyle

Eva Avila singles chronology
"Meant to Fly" (2006)	"'I Owe It All To You'" (2006)	"Fallin' for You" (2007)

"I Owe It All to You" is a pop song written by Alonzo, Jim Guthrie, Adam Messinger, and Damhnait Doyle for Eva Avila's debut album Somewhere Else (2006). The song was released as the album's second single in late 2006 and reached number nine on the Canadian BDS Airplay Chart.

== Music video ==
The video is street-themed, with many dancers and Avila singing the song.

== Official remixes ==
- Hatiras Remix
- Hatiras Vocal Mix
- Messinger Remix

== Chart performance ==
Chart (2006–2007)	Peak position
Canadian BDS Airplay Chart	9
Canada (Canadian Hot 100)	28
Canada CHR/Top 40 (Billboard)	9
Canada Hot AC (Billboard)	8
