= Homegrown Cafe =

Homegrown Cafe was a local-talent show that aired on CJOH in Ottawa, during the 1980s and 1990s. It showcased much of the city's talented youth and adults, some of whom went on to pursue professional careers.

The show was hosted by J.J. Clarke.

Auspicious guests included Vankleek Hill act the Bushmen, Sharon Proulx (Hart), Andi Harden, Kareena Dainty-Edward (singer - 2 seasons), Eva Avila (age 9), Julie Dainty, Chris Dainty and Marielle Lespérance (later seven time world highland dancing champion and 14 time Canadian champion).

Other notable performers were country musician Amanda Wilkinson, Leanne and Kelly Slade (members of professional dance group The Canadian Steppers) Leah Gordon (professional opera singer), Reiko Waisglass (fashion designer), Stephanie Cadman (singer in Group Belle Star), actor Ryan Gosling and Canada's first Canadian Idol winner Ryan Malcolm.

In 1998, CJOH undertook a major cost cutting endeavor, which included a severe reduction in local programming, during which Homegrown Cafe was cancelled despite its local popularity.
