= Give It All Away (Theo Tams album) =

Studio album by Theo Tams
- Released: May 19, 2009
- Recorded: Wellesley Sound, Blackfoot South Studio; Toronto
- Genre: Pop
- Length: 47:22
- Label: Sony Music Canada
- Producer: Greg Johnston

Singles from Give It All Away
- 1. "Sing" Released: September 11, 2008; 2. "Lazy Lovers" Released: 2009; 3. "Wait for You" Released: 2009; 4. "Manhattan Blue" Released: March 29, 2010

Give It All Away is the 2009 debut album by singer Theo Tams, the winner of the sixth season of the reality television competition Canadian Idol.

== Background ==
Recorded in Toronto, the album was produced by Greg Johnston. It was released on 19 May 2009 on the Sony Music Canada label. The album includes thirteen songs including seven songs co-written by Tams, which is more than any previous Canadian Idol winner.

== Track listing ==
1. "I'm Gonna Say" – 3:42
2. "Reckless" – 4:05
3. "Wait for You" – 4:02
4. "Lazy Lovers" – 3:46
5. "When I Said Goodbye" – 3:30
6. "Fair-Weather Friend" – 3:22
7. "Dead Wrong" – 3:33
8. "I Ain't Cryin'" – 3:51
9. "Manhattan Blue" – 2:57
10. "Here We Go Again" – 3:10
11. "Let Go" – 3:42
12. "I Can't Say I'm Sorry" – 3:48
13. "Sing" – 3:54

== Release history ==
Country	Date
Canada	May 19, 2009

== Charts ==
Chart (2009)	Peak position
Canadian Albums Chart	29

=== Singles ===
Year	Single	Peak		
Year	Single	CAN	CAN 100	CAN AC
2007	"Sing"	11	12	—
2009	"Lazy Lovers"	—	88	8
2009	"Wait for You"	—	—	14
2010	"Manhattan Blue"	—	—	—
"—" denotes releases that did not chart
