= America's Hot Musician =

American television series

America's Hot Musician is an American television program which first aired on Lifetime Real Women in July 2008. The show is a reality talent competition which features strictly instrumental solo musicians of varying styles competing for a one year recording contract.

In its first season the program featured National Symphony Orchestra (United States) Principal Second Violinist Marissa Regni, Talena Atfield formerly of the all-female Canadian heavy metal band Kittie, and jazz trombonist Gregory Charles Royal as judges.

== History ==
The program was created by Gregory Charles Royal as Artistic Director of American Youth Symphony (AYS) in Washington, DC. The idea developed during the organization's Plight of American Music Initiative Conference at the Martin Luther King, Jr. Library in Washington, DC in February 2006. The conference, which was covered by Voice of America and Fox affiliate WTTG, featured a panel of industry representatives including Travis Bowerman from the Washington Performing Arts Society, Ashley Gauthier, a media attorney from U.S. News & World Report, Malcolm Iniss from Radio One, AYS Executive Director Susan Veres and Gregory Charles Royal. The panel discussed ways to engage youth culture in instrumental music performance and the current condition of live music attendance. America's Hot Musician was developed to purposely follow a popular television format to attract more mainstream viewers.

The program began airing on public, educational, and government access (PEG) channels in various states in 2006 including Washington, DC, Madison, Wisconsin, Minneapolis and Boston before scheduling to air as a paid program on the Oxygen Network in July 2007. A subsequent legal battle ensued in federal court over the show's cancellation and the program aired primarily on the internet and regional broadcast channels WRNN-TV in New York and KDOC-TV in Los Angeles.

The initial 2006 season which had been assembled with musicians from the internet with auditions in Los Angeles, Minneapolis and Washington, DC incorporated the winners of that competition into a national version of the program in 2007, with a new crop musicians, which was to air on the Oxygen Network.

The finals of the first season, a combination of 2006 and 2007 competitors, was taped at the George Washington University in Washington, DC on June 13, 2008 and the organization negotiated to have the finals air on Lifetime Real Women on July 12 and July 20, 2008. Comedian Vic Christian and Clare Dagress were added as hosts. Guitarist Bobby McManus was voted the first season winner.

The show released a first-season winner's recording with Canadian Idol finalist Sarah Loverock in October 2009.

The release entitled "The Dreamer", which was written by judge Gregory Charles Royal, was certified Gold by the Canadian Recording Industry Association CRIA on November 4, 2009.

America's Hot Musician aired on Lifetime Real Women in July 2008 [13] with Royal, National Symphony Orchestra Principal Second Violinist, Marissa Regni and nu-metal bassist Talena Atfield as judges, hosted by comedian Vic Christian.
