= Fall for You =

Fall for You may refer to:

- "Fall for You" (Secondhand Serenade song), 2008
- "Fall for You" (The Whitlams song), 2002
- Fall for You (album), a 2014 album by Leela James and the title song from the album

== See also ==
- Fallen For You (foaled 2009), a British Thoroughbred racehorse and broodmare
- Falling for You (disambiguation)
- Fallin' for You (disambiguation)
