= Rob James (singer) =

Canadian singer and songwriter

Rob James (born October 30, 1977) is a Canadian singer and songwriter from Winnipeg, Manitoba who is known for being a former member of the pop group McMaster & James and the seventh-place finalist in the 2006 season of Canadian Idol.

In 1997, he formed McMaster & James with Luke McMaster, and released a certified Canadian Gold album with the group in 2000, featuring their hit singles "Love Wins Everytime", "Thank You", "I Understand", and "Sweet Sensation" while opening for pop artists like Christina Aguilera and 'N Sync.

After the group's success faded and their album deal expired, Rob auditioned for Canadian Idol in 2006. Rob was ranked among the show's Top 10, becoming the first-ever finalist from the province of Manitoba. He was eliminated after making it into the top 7.

As a writer, Rob has had much success, penning singles for the original Canadian Idol, Juno-nominated Ryan Malcolm, Grammy-nominated rapper Fresh I.E., pop/country star Jesse Labelle, and has worked with some of the industry's most acclaimed songwriters, including Chris Perry, Randy Bachman, Jess Cates, Justin Gray, Jeremy Ruzumna and Simon Perry.
