= High Five Drive =

Punk rock band

- Origin: Winnipeg, Manitoba, Canada
- Genres: Punk rock Pop punk Melodic hardcore Skate punk
- Years active: 2001–present
- Labels: Bad Mood, Fond of Life, No Reason, Fast Circle, Spawner
- Members: Greg Rekus; Steve Jowsey; Steve Nelson; Marty Lafreniere
- Website: www.highfivedrive.com/

High Five Drive is a melodic hardcore/skate punk band from Winnipeg, Manitoba, Canada, known for their high-energy live performances.

== History ==
Since forming in 2001, they have released one EP and three full-length albums. They have toured across Canada, appearing with such bands as Comeback Kid, A Wilhelm Scream, the Cancer Bats and Die Mannequin. In May 2009, they embarked on their third European tour, playing with The Living Daylights and Rentokill.

Their latest album, FullBlast, was produced and engineered by John Peters, known for working with Comeback Kid and A Textbook Tragedy. This album was released in Europe on various labels including Bad Mood Records, No Reason Records, and Fond of Life Records. This album was released independently in Canada and on Fast Life Records in Japan.

== Band members ==
=== Current members ===
- Greg Rekus (Guitar, Vocals)
- Steve Jowsey (Drums, Vocals)
- Steve Nelson (Bass guitar)
- Marty Lafreniere (Guitar, Vocals)

=== Former members ===
- Dal Reimer (Guitar, Vocals)
- Brent Smith (Bass guitar)
- Nick Kolisnyk (Drums)

== Discography ==
=== ...Something Better (EP) (2002) ===
1. A Relative Matter
2. Reflection
3. Lead Boots
4. Discouragement
5. Potential

=== Service Engine Soon (2004) ===
1. Colic
2. A Relative Matter
3. Straight and Narrow Minded
4. Fallen
5. Is This My Life?
6. September
7. No Buddah, No Dharma
8. As This Body Betrays Me
9. This is My Rifle
10. Abandon This Compromise

=== From the Ground Up (2007) ===
1. Separation
2. End In Grey
3. Left Behind
4. The Storm Before Calm
5. Hope For The Best
6. Looking Past It All
7. Thought Crime Agenda
8. Survivor
9. Remember Everything
10. Never Around

=== FullBlast (2009) ===
1. Vengeance Theme
2. Eight Hour Drives
3. Foreign Mantras Make Great Role Models
4. Our Great War
5. Inspiration is Realization
6. Party of One
7. Never Give Up
8. Peace Lies Beyond
9. The Memories That Keep
10. Save Yourself
11. Nowhere to Hide
12. Underbreath Regrets

== See also ==
- List of bands from Canada
