= Pete Samples =

- Born: Brent Freedman
- Origin: Winnipeg, Manitoba, Canada
- Genre: Electronica

Pete Samples is the electronic music project and professional name of Canadian musician Brent Freedman, a Winnipeg and Montreal-based solo artist and a multi-instrumentalist.

== Early life ==
Freedman's mother was a clothing designer. Originally from Winnipeg, he began experimenting with electronic music and moved to Montreal, where he studied fine art at Concordia University in Montreal.

== Career ==
Freedman began performing and recording under the name Pete Samples. Samples' first album, An Unsent Letter, was released in 2004, and his second album, Yours Makes Mine, was released in 2007. Yours Makes Mine charted at number 10 for 2007 on the !Earshot National Campus and Community Radio Association electronic charts.

In 2008, Samples released a mini-album, "The Jumper Cables". which appeared on the Electronica Top 50 charts. In 2010, the project's single "Bekonscot" was played regularly on campus and community radio. That year Samples performed at the Halifax Pop Explosion.

Freedman and his wife Robin McMillan moved from Montreal to Vancouver, where he began experimenting with woodworking, creating small wooden furniture models in his home studio.

A final album, Bekonscot, for which Freedman, as Pete Samples, wrote all of the songs, was created by recording and layering in his singing and playing of various instruments. In line with his shift in focus toward designing in wood, the album was packaged with photographs of his wooden furniture models and designs. In 2011, Samples toured with Rich Aucoin, including a performance in Ottawa.

By 2013, Freedman's career as Pete Samples was in hiatus. He and McMillan concentrated on opening a furniture design company called Gamla in Vancouver, specializing in pieces suitable for apartment and condo-sized spaces. They moved to Bowen Island, where Freedman set up a workshop and studio.

== Discography ==
- Unsent Letters (2004)
- Northern Faction 3 Compilation (2005)
- Fear of a Digital Planet Compilation (2006)
- Yours Makes Mine (2007)
- The Jumper Cables (2008) Limited 200 made
- Bekonscot (2010)
