= Somewhere Else (Eva Avila album) =

Studio album by Eva Avila
- Released: November 14, 2006 (Canada)
- Recorded: September–October 2006
- Genre: Pop, R&B
- Label: Sony BMG
- Producer: Rob Wells, Adam Messinger, Cyndi Lauper

Eva Avila chronology
Somewhere Else (2006)	Give Me the Music (2008)

Singles from Somewhere Else
- 1. "Meant to Fly" Released: September 26, 2006; 2. "I Owe It All to You" Released: October 2006; 3. "Fallin' for You" Released: 2007

Professional ratings
Review scores
Source	Rating
Allmusic	2.5/5 stars

Somewhere Else is the first album by Eva Avila, the winner of the fourth season of Canadian Idol. It was released in Canada on November 14, 2006. Three singles were released from the album: "Meant to Fly", "I Owe It All To You" and "Fallin' for You". The album was largely produced by Rob Wells, although one song, "This Kind of Love", was produced by Cyndi Lauper. According to Avila, the album took three and a half weeks to record.

In January 2007, Somewhere Else was certified gold in Canada.

== Track listing ==
1. "I Owe It All to You" (Alonzo, Jim Guthrie, Adam Messinger, Damhnait Doyle)
2. "Not So Different" (Greg Wells, Kara DioGuardi, Stacie Orrico)
3. "Stop Cryin'" (Adam Messinger, Liz Rodrigues)
4. "Should I Fall" (Rob Wells, Christopher Ward, Marc Costanzo, Jenna Gawne)
5. "Got a Feelin'" (Mikkel Eriksen, Teron Beal, Thara Prashad, Tor Erik Hermansen)
6. "Weak in the Knees" (Adam Messinger, Liz Rodrigues)
7. "Old Love Song" (Sherry St. Germain, Vince Pizzinga, Ben Dunk, Tino Zolfo)
8. "Some Kind of Beautiful" (Elliot Kennedy, Matthew Marston, Amy Pearson)
9. "I Don't Wanna Cry" (Rob Wells, Chris Anderson, Frank Morell, Candace M. Bascoe)
10. "This Kind of Love" (Cyndi Lauper, Marcello Nines)
11. "Bittersweet" (Rob Wells, Matthew Marston)
12. "Meant to Fly" (Chantal Kreviazuk, Raine Maida, Gaby Moreno)
13. "Fallin' for You" (Lindy Robbins, Jorge Corante, Carmen Reece)

iTunes exclusive:

1. "Tomorrow Tonight" (Chris Anderson, Frank Morell)
2. "Myself" (KT Tunstall, Martin Slattery, Scott Shields)

== Singles ==
- "Meant to Fly" (September 2006)
- "I Owe It All To You" (November 2006)
- "Fallin' for You" (April 2007)

== Charts ==
Chart (2006)	Peak position
Canadian Albums Chart	6

== Certifications ==
Country	Certification	Sales/shipments
Canada	Gold	70,000/80,000
