= Keith Macpherson =

Keith Macpherson is a Canadian singer, musician, and songwriter. Keith was a member of the Top 22 in the fourth season of Canadian Idol.

Born and raised in Winnipeg, Manitoba he auditioned for the show Canadian Idol in Toronto, Ontario. He is an English major at the University of Winnipeg.

He also sings with Renee Lamoureux in a local pop group Keith and Renée (formerly named Easily Amused). He has been with his band over the past 10 years without a record label or management deal.

== Awards ==
Since 2001 the combination of the band quickly vaulted them onto national television in Canada. Macpherson's and Lamoureux's CD Release, Simple Stuff, has been nominated for a Western Canadian Music Award in the "Outstanding Pop Album" category.

Canadian Music Award for Best Online Indie Artists. Their touring and performing at American Campuses has recently landed them an award for The Best College Duo in the United States.

== Easily Amused discography ==
Three albums have been released by the Easily Amused group:

- Novice (2001)
- Simple Stuff (2004)
- Revolution (2007)
- Detours (2010)

Easily Amused has also had their songs used in two commercials and three shows radio free Roscoe, 15 love and Degrassi: the next generation. some of the songs used were no one's fool, only a girl, and good year.

== Canadian Idol song list ==
Songs that Keith performed on Canadian Idol are:

1. Top 22: Collide (Howie Day)
2. Top 18: Best I Ever Had (Grey Sky Morning) (Vertical Horizon)
3. Top 14: Tempted (Squeeze) - Eliminated 07/12/06
