= Meant to Fly =

"Meant To Fly"

Single by Eva Avila

from the album Somewhere Else
- Released: 2006
- Recorded: September 19, 2006
- Genre: Pop
- Length: 3:22
- Label: Sony BMG Canada
- Songwriters: Chantal Kreviazuk, Raine Maida, Gaby Moreno

Eva Avila singles chronology
"Meant To Fly" (2006)	"I Owe It All to You" (2007)

"Meant to Fly" is a song written by Chantal Kreviazuk, Raine Maida and Gaby Moreno, for 2006 Canadian Idol winner Eva Avila. The song was released as the first single from her debut album, Somewhere Else, on September 26, 2006. After she was crowned the winner of the fourth season, "Meant to Fly" began receiving airplay across Canada.

Both Avila and Craig Sharpe performed the song separately during the September 11 grand finale performance show and were both praised by Idol judges Sass Jordan, Farley Flex, Zack Werner and Jake Gold.

== Chart performance ==
"Meant to Fly" topped the Canadian Singles Chart for about nine non-consecutive weeks, beginning October 5, 2006. Its debut atop the chart marked the first time that an American Idol and Canadian Idol contestant occupied the top two positions. The song reached number six on the Canadian BDS Airplay Chart and was a substantial hit on contemporary radio. With the introduction of the Billboard Canadian Hot 100 in 2007, the song appeared on the chart, peaking at #74 there. It was certified Double Platinum in Canada in December 2006.

=== Charts ===
Chart (2006–2007)	Peak position
Canada (Nielsen SoundScan)|	1
Canada Hot 100 (Billboard)	74
Canada AC (Billboard)	2
Canada CHR/Top 40 (Billboard)	22
Canada Hot AC (Billboard)	14
