= McMaster & James =

Canadian musical duo

- Origin: Winnipeg, Manitoba, Canada
- Genres: R&B, pop, soul,
- Years active: 1997–2002, 2019–present
- Members: Luke McMaster and Rob James

McMaster & James is a Canadian soul/pop "boy band" music duo from Winnipeg, Manitoba.

== History ==
Luke McMaster (born 22 March 1976) and Rob James (born 30 October 1977) met in 1997 through Winnipeg-based producer Chris Burke-Gaffney and began collaborating as Two Face, later performing and recording under their combined names. Their gold, self-titled debut CD, released in February 2000 on ViK. Recordings, a domestic label formed by BMG Music Canada, a subsidiary of BMG, yielded the hits "Love Wins Everytime", "Thank You", "I Understand", and "Sweet Sensation", which were well received by Canadian radio.

McMaster & James toured nationally, securing the opening spots for NSYNC Canadian dates and on Christina Aguilera's Canadian tour that year, including a 13 July 2000 date for Aguilera at the Winnipeg Arena. In the fall of 2000, the band was nominated in four categories, McMaster & James won Entertainers of the Year at the Prairie Music Awards via fan vote.

In 2001, their song "Thank You" was named by SOCAN as one of the most performed Canadian pop songs on Canadian radio, while "I Understand" won the Prairie Music Award (PMA) award for Best Song. The duo parted amicably in 2002.

In 2003, Luke McMaster decided to focus on his songwriting and production, signing with Universal Music Publishing Group Canada in 2004 for an association that lasted through 2012, placing songs with Rihanna, Nick Carter, Nick Lachey, Kalan Porter, Marc Jordan (he co-wrote Jordan's 2010 Top 40 hit, "Falling Man") and others.

In 2006, Rob James was a contestant on the fourth season of Canadian Idol, finishing seventh.

As a self-published (through his own Ekul Music) solo recording artist, Luke McMaster teamed up with Grammy-nominated American pianist Jim Brickman in 2013 for "Good Morning, Beautiful" – a co-written Top 3 Billboard AC hit.

McMaster released his solo album, Icons of Soul, which includes collaborations with Felix Cavaliere and Lamont Dozier.

On 5 September 2019, McMaster & James reunited for a private performance of "Thank You". During this performance, Luke McMaster announced that the band was planning a tour. In November 2023, McMaster & James reunited for another performance at Rob's wedding.

== See also ==
- Luke McMaster
- Rob James
