= Fallin' for You (Eva Avila song) =

Single by Eva Avila

from the album Somewhere Else
- Released: 2007
- Recorded: October 2006
- Genre: Pop
- Length: 4:24
- Label: Sony BMG Canada
- Songwriters: Jorge "Gman" Corante (music), Lindy Robbins (words and melody), Carmen Reece (words and melody)
- Producer: Adam Messinger

Eva Avila singles chronology
"I Owe It All to You" (2006)	"'Fallin' for You'" (2007)	"Give Me the Music" (2008)

"Fallin' for You" is the third single from Eva Avila's debut album, Somewhere Else. The song was produced by Adam Messinger with music by Jorge Corante and words and melody by Lindy Robbins and Carmen Reece. It was released for radio airplay on April 3 across Canada, and in the final 16 seconds of the track separated from the song, Avila sings in Spanish. The song also ended up becoming a top forty hit in Canada, peaking at number 35 on the Canadian Hot 100.

== Music video ==
Scenes of the music video are shown with Avila lying in her bed, lying on a couch in her living room, and in a different room with wooden walls. The music video premiered on MTV on April 9.

== Chart performance ==
Chart (2007)	Peak position
Canada Hot 100 (Billboard)	35
Canada CHR/Top 40 (Billboard)	28
Canada Hot AC (Billboard)	15
