= Alphabet Soup Children's Entertainment =

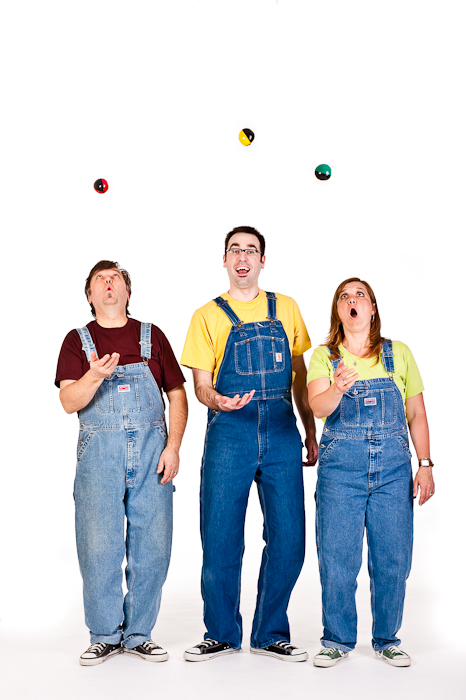
- Alphabet Soup by Gabrielle Touchette Photography

Background information
- Also known as: Soup
- Origin: Winnipeg, Manitoba, Canada
- Genres: Children's music Comedy
- Years active: 2000–2010
- Labels: Eh! BCD Music
- Members: Tim Braun; Micki Casey; Sean Hogan
- Website: alphabetsoup.ca

Alphabet Soup Children's Entertainment (commonly referred to as Alphabet Soup or simply Soup) was a Canadian trio of children's entertainers based in Winnipeg, Manitoba.

== History ==
Alphabet Soup was formed in 2000. They performed at festivals, the Manitoba Children's Museum, at local events, and on CBC Radio 3. In 2008 the trio released their first album, You're It!, which was nominated for a WCMA award.

Despite the venture into studio recording, as a children's band Alphabet Soup is principally a live act. Their shows include audience participation; the creation of the "Winnipeg Philharmonica" by handing out harmonicas to audience members is a common feature. Such antics, along with clear positive feedback from the attending children, led to favourable reviews in local media and the group performed at a number of festivals. In addition to their musical work, Alphabet Soup support local charities such as food banks.
