= Eva Avila =

Canadian singer

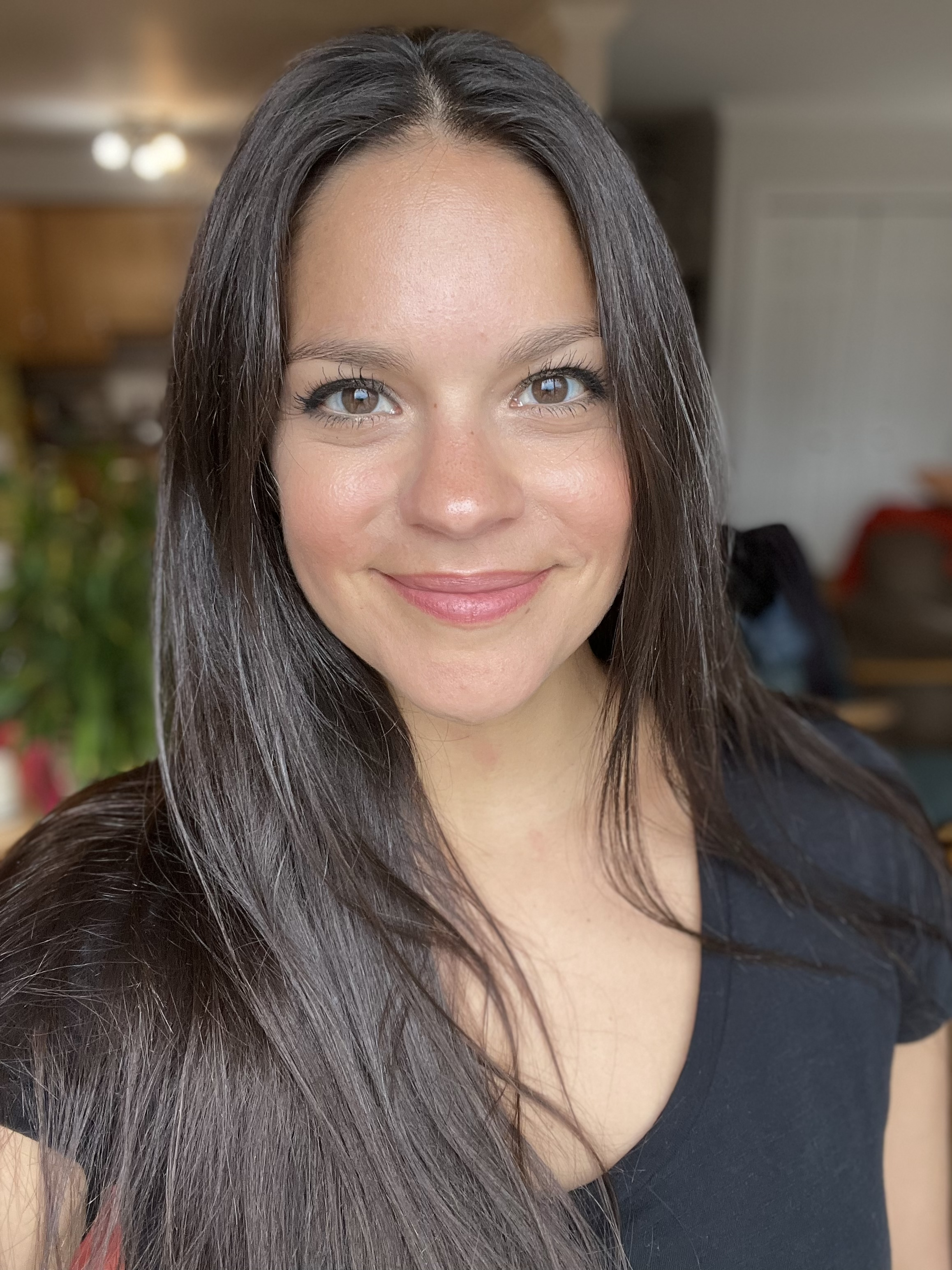
- Avila in 2022

Background information
- Born: Eva Gougeon-Ávila; 25 February 1987 (age 39); Gatineau, Quebec, Canada
- Genres: Pop; R&B
- Occupations: Singer; actress
- Years active: 2006–present
- Labels: Sony Music Canada, E1 Entertainment Canada
- Website: evaavila.net

Eva Avila (born Eva Gougeon-Ávila on 25 February 1987) is a Canadian singer. She won the fourth season of the CTV reality show Canadian Idol in 2006.

== Early life ==
Avila was born in Gatineau, Quebec. Her father introduced her to music and singing. She has been singing in public since age 2, and at age 9 was a winner on Homegrown Cafe, a talent show on CJOH-TV in Ottawa. Prior to Idol, she worked as a postal clerk and a beauty consultant. She is a former winner of the Jeune Diva du Québec contest. Avila also participated in another competition for a Quebec TV téléroman aired on Radio-Canada called Virginie. She speaks English, French and Spanish. Her nickname, given by her family when she was a small child, is still Eva le dragon (Eva the dragon).

== Career ==
=== 2006: Canadian Idol ===
In early 2006, Avila auditioned for the fourth season of Canadian Idol in Ottawa. She advanced into the top 10, and then she made it to the final two of the competition. During the final show, hundreds of Avila's supporters were gathered at Gatineau City Hall while Canadian Idol crews were filming scenes occasionally during the show. Several local politicians such as Gatineau mayor Marc Bureau, Hull—Aylmer federal MP Marcel Proulx, as well as Hull provincial MNA Roch Cholette were in attendance. During the finale show, Judge Zack Werner said that Avila was the show's most obvious candidate for international stardom, but he thought Craig Sharpe would win the competition. However, on 16 September 2006, Eva Avila was crowned as the fourth Canadian Idol winner, defeating Craig Sharpe by a margin of only 131,000 votes or 3%. To date, she is one of only five singers from Quebec or Francophone Canada to crack the top ten and the first to win the event: Season one's Audrey de Montigny was the first to reach the top ten, Steffi DiDomenicantonio in season four, Khalila Glanville in season five and Katherine St-Laurent in season six.

==== Canadian Idol performances ====
Week	Theme	Song sung	Artist	Status
Audition	–	"On My Own"	Les Misérables	Advanced
Top 22	Contestant's Choice	"Angel"	Sarah McLachlan	Advanced
Top 18	Contestant's Choice	"Killing Me Softly with His Song"	Roberta Flack	Advanced
Top 14	Contestant's Choice	"Ain't No Mountain High Enough"	Marvin Gaye; Tammi Terrell	Advanced
Top 10	Canadian Hits	"Powerless (Say What You Want)"	Nelly Furtado	Safe
Top 9	The Rolling Stones	"Wild Horses"	Rolling Stones	Safe
Top 8	Songs of the 1980s	"White Wedding"	Billy Idol	Bottom 3
Top 7	Songs of classic rock	"Who Wants to Live Forever?"	Queen	Safe
Top 6	Acoustic Music	"How Come U Don't Call Me Anymore?"	Prince	Safe
Top 5	Songs of Country	"Here You Come Again"	Dolly Parton	Bottom 2
Top 4	Judges' Choice	"Would I Lie to You?" "Old School Love"	Eurythmics; Divine Brown	Safe
Top 3	Pop Standards	"God Bless the Child" "They Can't Take That Away from Me"	Billie Holiday; Fred Astaire	Safe
Top 2	Idol's Favourite; Idol Single; Idol's Favourite	"Wild Horses" "Meant to Fly" "How Come U Don't Call Me Anymore?"	Natasha Bedingfield; Eva Avila; Prince	Won
Grand Finale	Idol's Favourite	"Powerless (Say What You Want)"	Nelly Furtado	Declared Winner

=== 2006–2007: Somewhere Else ===
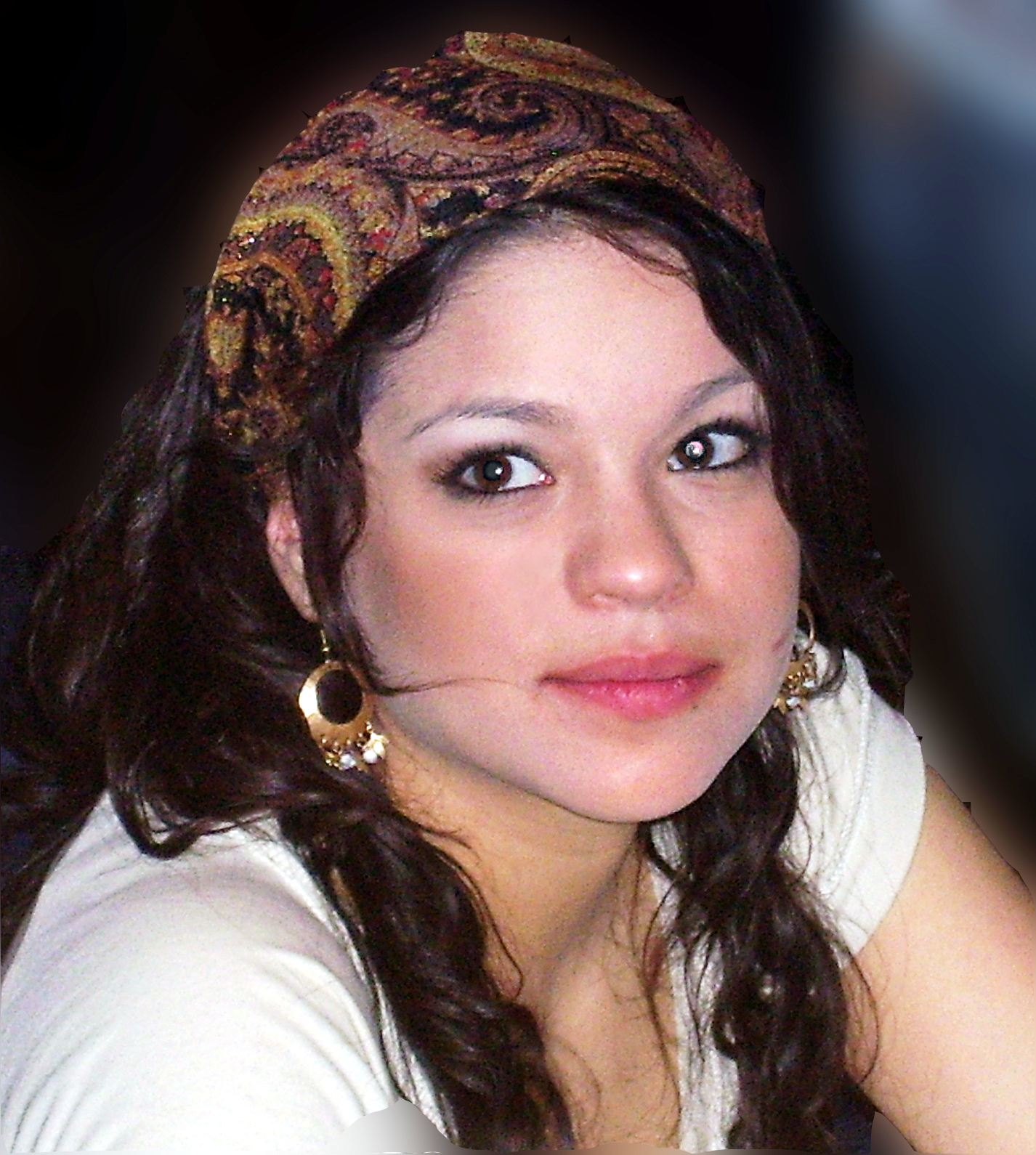
Avila in 2007

Hours after her victory, Avila signed with the Sony BMG Canada record label and released her first single "Meant to Fly", which debuted at number one on the Canadian singles chart, a position it held for a huge nine weeks. The single was eventually certified double platinum. On 5 October 2006, the CTV television network reported that Avila has signed a modelling contract with Ford Model. Avila started the 2006 NHL season on 4 October when she performed the Canadian national anthem at the Toronto Maple Leafs vs. Ottawa Senators game. She performed the anthem again before another Battle of Ontario game at the Scotiabank Place on 26 October following an autograph session on the same afternoon at Gatineau's Les Galeries de Hull shopping centre.

Avila's debut album, Somewhere Else, was released on 14 November 2006, and debuted at number 6 on the Canadian albums chart, selling 16,000 copies in its first week. The second single from the album, "I Owe It All to You", peaked at number nine. On 19 November 2006, Avila performed the national anthem at the 94th Grey Cup game in Winnipeg. Eva and her Canadian Idol predecessor, Melissa O'Neil, were both nominated for the 2007 Juno Award for Best New Artist, but Tomi Swick won the award. The third and final single from Avila's album, "Fallin' for You" was released in April 2007 and peaked at number thirty-five.

=== 2008–2010: Give Me the Music ===
On 26 March 2007, eTalk confirmed that Avila would be the new face of Maybelline New York, making her the first Canadian to be a face for the brand. Also in 2007, she participated on the hip hop compilation Les 40 Voleurs with La Dynastie on the song "La Fausse Raison". Eva also recorded the song "Canada (You're a Lifetime Journey)," the finale tune to the film O Canada!, which was shown at the Canadian pavilion in Epcot in Orlando, Florida from 2007 through 2019.

Following the success of her debut album, Avila returned to the recording studio in Toronto to begin work on her second album. On 9 August 2008, she announced on Canada's eTalk that the first single to be taken from her second album would be called "Give Me The Music", composed by Matrax Production and written by Frankie Storm, Tee Marie a.k.a. Tanya Miller of (Tha Kopi Writz) and Shaun Johnson and would be released on 2 September, with the album of the same name following on 28 October. She also stated that the record label, Sony BMG Canada were hoping to make the record her first American release. If the album was released and well received in America, Avila stated that she hoped to extend the album's supportive tour into the U.S. When released in Canada on 28 October, Eva's second album, Give Me the Music, hit the national albums chart at number 63, a surprisingly low debut considering the lead single had peaked at number 21 on the Canadian Hot 100. "Damned", the second single from the album debuted on the Hot 100 in January 2009 and peaked at number 83. In late March 2009, Avila was the support act for the four Canadian dates of Beyoncé Knowles' I Am... World Tour. She recently performed at the Virgin Festival 2009 in Montreal. She was the third act. She also performed at the 2010 Winter Olympics closing ceremony on 28 February 2010.

=== 2011 ===
Eva Avila sang the National Anthem and performed at the halftime show at the Montreal Alouettes' home opener on 29 June 2011. She sang three songs, including "I Owe It All to You".

=== 2013–present: Never Get Enough ===
On 15 October 2013, Avila released "Bitter Meets Sweet", the first single from her EP Never Get Enough, released on 5 May 2015.

In 2015, Avila recorded "Unidos Somos Mas", the Spanish language version of the theme song for the 2015 Pan American Games. It was one of three versions of the song, alongside Serena Ryder's English-language "Together We Are One" and Jasmine Denham's French "Ensemble on est immense".

She has also had occasional television and film acting roles, including as Tania in the 2022 drama film Coyote and as Ellie Edison in 2024's Autumn and the Black Jaguar.

Avila has been a vocalist in the Pink Floyd tribute band Brit Floyd since 2018 and retiring from the band in 2025.. There are numerous versions of Avila singing "Great Gig In The Sky" on Youtube.

== Personal life ==
Eva Avila married Brit Floyd bandmate and guitarist Edo Scordo in May 2020.

== Discography ==
Eva Avila discography
- Studio albums: 2
- Singles: 5
- Music videos: 4
- B-sides: 3
- Miscellaneous: 2
- Tours: 2

The following is a complete discography of every album and single released by Avila.

=== Albums ===
Year	Album details	Peak	Certifications (sales threshold)
Year	Album details	CAN	Certifications (sales threshold)
2006	Somewhere Else: Released: 14 November 2006; Label: Sony BMG; Format: CD, digital download	6	CAN: Gold
2008	Give Me the Music: Released: 28 October 2008; Label: Sony BMG; Format: CD, digital download	63	
2015	Never Get Enough: Released: 5 May 2015; Label: Entertainment One Canada; Format: digital download	—	
"—" denotes releases that did not chart.

=== Singles ===
Year	Song	CAN	Certifications	Album
2006	"Meant to Fly"	1	CAN: 2× Platinum	Somewhere Else
2006	"I Owe It All to You"	28		Somewhere Else
2007	"Fallin' for You"	35		Somewhere Else
2008	"Give Me the Music"	21		Give Me the Music
2009	"Damned"	83		Give Me the Music
2009	"No More Coming Back"	—		Give Me the Music
2013	"Bitter Meets Sweet"	—		Never Get Enough
2015	"Unido somos mas"	—		non-album single
"—" denotes releases that did not chart.

=== Promotional singles ===
- "The Little Drummer Boy" (2012)

==== Other recordings ====
- "Canada (You're a Lifetime Journey)" (from Epcot's O Canada film at Walt Disney World)

==== Appeared on ====
- Canadian Idol: Spotlights (August 2006)

=== Tours ===
2007: Somewhere Else Tour
2009: I Am... World Tour (support act)

== Filmography ==
- 2022: Coyote, directed by Katherine Jerkovic : Tania
- 2024: Autumn and the Black Jaguar, directed by Gilles de Maistre : Ellie Edison

== See also ==
- Canadian rock
- Music of Canada
