= Rat Silo =

Canadian rock band

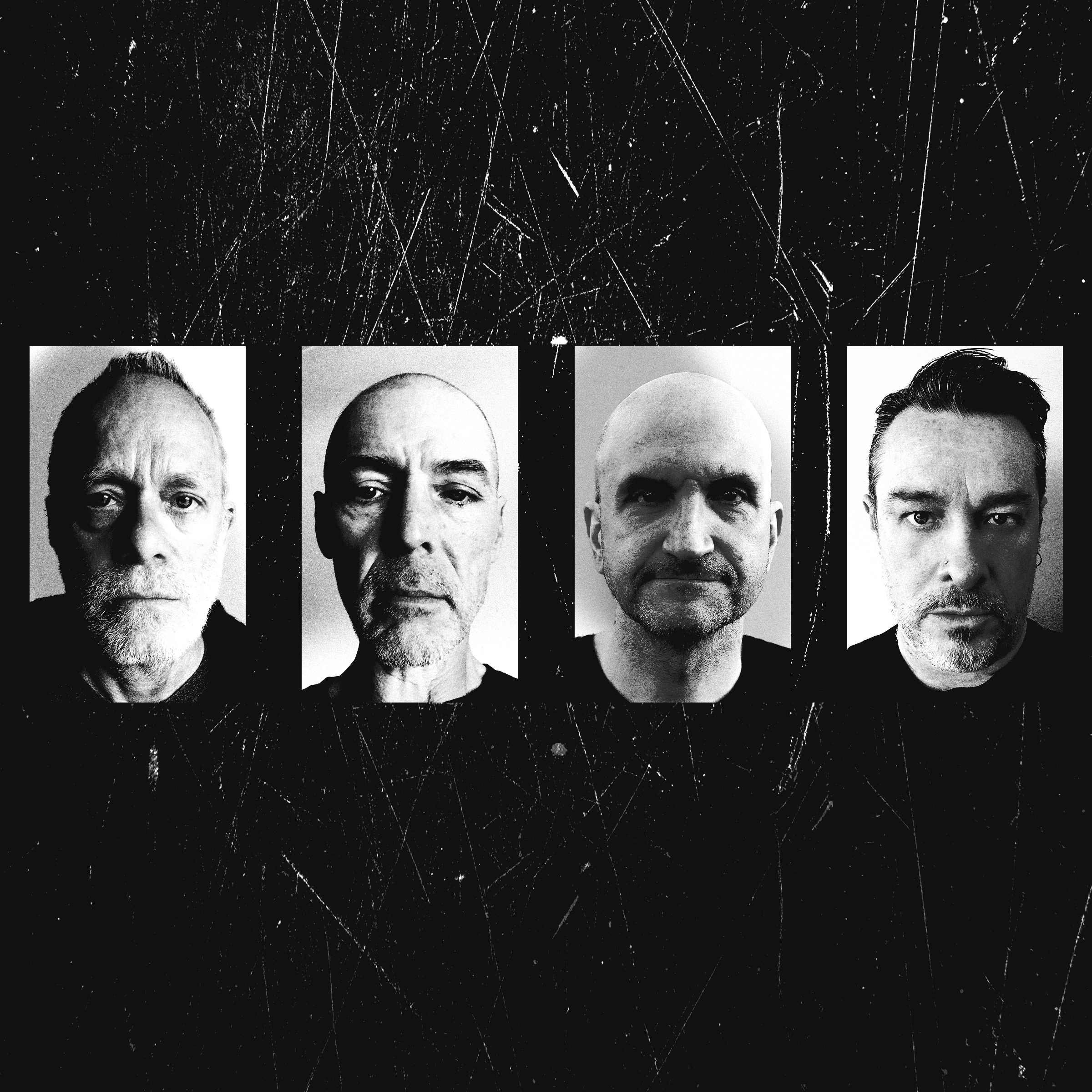
- Rat Silo in 2020. From left to right: Jim Newton, Don Binns, Erkan Gencol, and Sean Stubbs.

Background information
- Origin: Vancouver, British Columbia, Canada
- Genres: Alternative rock; Indie-rock; Post-punk; Post-rock
- Years active: 2007–present
- Labels: SODEH Records, Rat Silo Music Complex
- Members: Jim Newton; Don Binns; Sean Stubbs; Erkan Gencol
- Past members: Finn Manniche; David Osborne
- Website: ratsilo.com

Rat Silo is a Canadian Alternative rock group based in Vancouver, British Columbia, Canada founded by James Newton, the former lead vocalist and guitarist of Canadian alternative rock band Sons of Freedom.

== History ==
Originally formed in November 2007, Jim Newton organized the recording of the band's first album 'November 2007:What the Butler Saw' at North Vancouver's Crew Studios (formally Baker Street Studios) over a three-day session. Newton recruited Vancouver musicians Don Binns on bass (Sons of Freedom, Trailerhawk, Econoline Crush, Art Bergmann), Sean Stubbs on drums (Numb, SNFU, Jakalope, Bif Naked), Finn Manniche (Jazzmanian Devils, Van Django) on guitar, and Dave "Oz" Osbourne (54-40) on keyboards. Mark Henning produced and engineered the sessions.

In April 2009, Rat Silo's second album, 'Doubleplusungood' was released, It was recorded by Robert Handel and mixed by Mark Henning.

In October 2011, their third album, 'The Great Northern Way', was released. The album was recorded and mixed by Dave "Rave" Ogilvie at Vancouver's historic Mushroom Studios.

In 2017, following a two-year hiatus, Newton, Binns and Stubbs reformed and began working on new material. A fourth member, Erkan Gencol was added to the new line-up who introduced ambient samples, loops, and textures to augment the band's predominantly "guitar-driven" sound. In November 2019, the single, 'I Sacrifice: A veteran's lament' was released. It was recorded and mixed by producer/engineer Mike Foster at Vancouver's Blackfish Sound Studio.

In May 2020, their fourth album 'The World Is Going To End Tomorrow' was released. It was recorded and mixed earlier that year by Dave "Rave" Ogilvie and Anthony "Fu" Valcic at Vancouver's Hipposonic Studios.

In May 2022, the single, 'The World Is Going to End Tomorrow' was released. It was one of a group of songs recorded and mixed earlier that year by Dave "Rave" Ogilvie and Anthony "Fu" Valcic at Vancouver's Hipposonic Studios. The song's release was accompanied with a live-performance video recorded at the "Rat’s Nest rehearsal space" by Vancouver photographer, author, and filmmaker Adam P.W. Smith.

Rat Silo's fifth album entitled 'Unfortunately...' was released on November 21, 2022. The seven-song album contained two previously released singles "The World Is Going To End Tomorrow" and "Head on a Stick", along with five new tracks. All the album's songs were recorded at Vancouver's Hipposonic Studios by Dave "Rave" Ogilvie and Liam Moes and then mixed by Anthony "Fu" Valcic at his home studio in Halfmoon Bay, BC.

=== 2023–Present: SODEH Records, Id, 1933, and beyond. ===
In 2024 - with a new label partnership with Montreal's SODEH Records - Rat Silo released six singles; Gun Gun Dogh, Go_Go_17, Never Walk Home Alone, Cantrustaman, Killedaman, and You're Doing It Wrong. The album entitled 'Id' was then released at the end of 2024. The nine tracks from Id were recorded at Vancouver's Hipposonic Studios by Dave "Rave" Ogilvie and Liam Moes, and mixed by Anthony "Fu" Valcic.

Later in 2024, the band entered Hipposonic Studios once again and recorded 8 tracks of new material with producer Dave "Rave" Ogilvie and engineer Liam Moes. SODEH Records plans to release this material as singles at regular intervals throughout 2025, culminating with an album entitled '1933' released at the end of the year. All songs from these sessions were mixed by long-time collaborator Anthony "Fu" Valcic in the Dolby ATMOS format.

In February of 2026, the band continued the tradition of working with Dave "Rave" Ogilvie and Liam Moes by recording at Vancouver's Hipposonic Studios and mixing with Anthony "Fu" Valcic in his Music House Studios in Halfmoon Bay, BC. Those sessions resulted in nine tracks; The Ambulance Song, Come On California, Don't Pass Me By, Wrong! Living In A Fever, The Mardis Gras, Whiskey On The House, No Warning, and Disco's Dead (and I mean it). Videos by Adam PW Smith and Ani Kyd Wolf accompanied these songs. SODEH Records is releasing the music and videos periodically beginning in the fall of 2026 and throughout 2027.

== Discography ==
=== Studio albums ===
- November 2007: What The Butler Saw (2007)
- March 2009: Doubleplusungood (2009)
- The Great Northern Way (2011)
- The World Is Going to End Tomorrow (2020)
- Unfortunately... (2022)
- Id (2024)
- 1933 (2025)

=== Singles ===
- I Sacrifice (2019)
- The World Is Going to End Tomorrow (2022)
- Head on a Stick (2022)
- Gun Gun Dogh (2024)
- Go_Go_17 (2024)
- Never Walk Home Alone (2024)
- Cantrustaman (2024)
- Killedaman (2024)
- Doing It Wrong (2024)
- I'm A Believer (2025)
- KILL GOD NOW (2025)
- When The Cops Start Running (2025)
- Busted (2025)
- Kick 'Em In The Head (2026)
- The Ambulance Song (2026)
- Come On California (2026)
