= Colette Trudeau =

Métis leader and singer-songwriter

- Born: Colette Marie Trudeau; June 17, 1985 (age 41)
- Origin: Vancouver, British Columbia, Canada
- Genre: Pop rock
- Occupations: Singer, songwriter
- Instruments: Vocals, Guitar
- Years active: 1993–present
- Labels: Her Royal Majesty's Records; Warner Music Canada
- Formerly of: LiveonRelease
- Website: Official homepage of Colette Trudeau

Colette Trudeau is a Canadian born Métis leader. As of 2025, she is CEO of the Métis Nation British Columbia. Earlier in her career she was a singer-songwriter, best known as a vocalist for the band LiveonRelease.

== LiveonRelease ==
LiveonRelease was founded by Colette Trudeau and Brittin Karroll, who had decided to form an all-female rock band at the age of 15. Colette used The Georgia Straight, an entertainment newspaper in Vancouver, to recruit the rest of the band: Foxx Herst and Leah Emmott. After doing small gigs, the band invited Vancouver rocker Bif Naked to an outdoor show, leading her to sign them to her label "Her Royal Majesty's Records", distributed through Warner Music Canada.

As lead singer, Colette co-wrote their hit single "I'm Afraid of Britney Spears" which appeared in the movie and soundtrack for Dude, Where's My Car?. The band released four music videos on MuchMusic that received heavy rotation, and released two full-length albums. The band toured consistently, covering Canada and the U.S. East Coast, including a showcase in New York at the notorious CBGB's. Colette decided to pursue a solo career when the band split up in 2003.

== Solo career ==
Colette signed a production deal with Bananatoons Production and SA Track Works, where she has worked with songwriters Sean Hosein, Dane Deviller, Steve Smith, Anthony Anderson, Brian Howes, Davor Vulama, and Eddie Schwartz. To date, Colette has had her songs "Freeze", "Stay with me", and "Easier to Miss You" recorded by international artists. As a commercial artist, Colette's voice has been featured in ad campaigns for products such as Motorola, Kia Auto Dealerships, and Callaway Park.

Colette's song "I Don't Wanna Know" was added to the rotation on CHUM radio stations across Canada in January 2008, with Colette winning the 'Up and Coming Artist of the Month'. "I Don't Wanna Know" found its way onto multiple radio stations top 20 charts. Colette recruited UBC film students to help her in the creation of the music video.

As a solo artist, Colette has headlined numerous shows in the greater Vancouver area, including performances at festivals, and played with artists such as Hedley and Faber Drive.

As an Aboriginal artist, Colette has had the opportunity to be a featured performer on APTN's My TV. My TV filmed Colette's Vancouver performance at New Music West and was interviewed at Gas Station Studios in Vancouver.

Colette's song "No Friend of Mine" appears on two episodes of South of Nowhere. "Don't Say Goodbye" was added to the movie The Break-Up Artist in 2009. "Freeze" was included in the 2010 release of Dancing Ninja.

In 2010, Colette began working with RockSTAR Music Corp. on her music career. Her self-titled debut album was released through her MySpace Tuesday, June 29, 2010. She is now a member of EDM band Red City.
