= All I Ever Wanted =

All I Ever Wanted may refer to:

== Music ==
- All I Ever Wanted (album), a 2009 album by Kelly Clarkson
  - All I Ever Wanted Tour, a 2009-2010 tour to support the album
- All I Ever Wanted: The Anthology, a 2014 album by Kirsty MacColl

=== Songs ===
- "All I Ever Wanted" (Aranda song), 2008; covered by Kelly Clarkson, 2009
- "All I Ever Wanted" (Basshunter song), 2008
- "All I Ever Wanted" (Brian Melo song), 2007
- "All I Ever Wanted" (Chuck Wicks song), 2008
- "All I Ever Wanted" (The Human League song), 2001
- "All I Ever Wanted" (Ivy song), 2024
- "All I Ever Wanted" (Kirsty MacColl song), 1991
- "All I Ever Wanted" (The Prince of Egypt song), a song by Amick Byram and Linda Dee Shayne, 1998
- "All I Ever Wanted (Was You)" ("Alltid sommer"), by Lars Fredriksen, 1998
- "All I Ever Wanted", by the Airborne Toxic Event from All at Once, 2011
- "All I Ever Wanted", by beFour from Friends 4 Ever, 2009
- "All I Ever Wanted", by Big Brovaz from Re-Entry, 2007
- "All I Ever Wanted", by Big Syke from Street Commando, 2002
- "All I Ever Wanted", by the BoDeans from Blend, 1996
- "All I Ever Wanted", by Brett Kissel from The Compass Project, 2023
- "All I Ever Wanted", by C-Bo from Til My Casket Drops, 1998
- "All I Ever Wanted", by Fredo from Third Avenue, 2019
- "All I Ever Wanted", by Johnny Logan, 1989
- "All I Ever Wanted", by Kaydee, 1998
- "All I Ever Wanted", by Lenny Kravitz from Mama Said, 1991
- "All I Ever Wanted", by Luni Coleone from In the Mouth of Madness, 2001
- "All I Ever Wanted", by Marti Pellow from Smile, 2001
- "All I Ever Wanted", by Mase from Double Up, 1999
- "All I Ever Wanted", by New Riders of the Purple Sage from New Riders of the Purple Sage, 1971
- "All I Ever Wanted", by Peter Andre from Natural, 1996
- "All I Ever Wanted", by the Reason from Things Couldn't Be Better, 2007
- "All I Ever Wanted", by Roxette from Room Service, 2009 reissue
- "All I Ever Wanted", by the Rua, 2018
- "All I Ever Wanted", by Santana from Marathon, 1979
- "All I Ever Wanted", by Shinedown from Leave a Whisper, 2003
- "All I Ever Wanted", by the Slackers from Do the Ska with The Slackers, 1992
- "All I Ever Wanted", by Stacey Q from Boomerang, 1997
- "All I Ever Wanted", by Stephen Ashbrook, 1993
- "All I Ever Wanted", by Taylor Dayne, B-side of "With Every Beat of My Heart", 1989
- "All I Ever Wanted", by Train from For Me, It's You, 2006
- "All I Ever Wanted", by Twiztid from Freek Show, 2000
- "All I Ever Wanted", by Winger, a non-album track from In the Heart of the Young, 1990
- "(Baby) All I Ever Wanted", by David Fonseca from Between Waves, 2009
- "Devotion (All I Ever Wanted)", by Ron van den Beuken

== Television ==
- "All I Ever Wanted" (Enlightened), an episode
- "All I Ever Wanted" (Girls), an episode

== See also ==
- "All (I Ever Want)", a 2005 song by Alexander Klaws featuring Sabrina Weckerlin
- "All I Ever Wanted to Be", a 2009 song by Lily Frost, theme song from Being Erica
- "All I've Ever Wanted", a 1993 song by Mariah Carey from Music Box
- All You Ever Wanted (disambiguation)
- Everything I Wanted (disambiguation)
