= Fifteen Will Get You Twenty =

EP by LiveonRelease
- Released: 2002
- Genre: Pop punk, Rock
- Label: Her Royal Majesty's Records

LiveonRelease chronology
Fifteen Will Get You Twenty (2002)	Seeing Red (2002)

Fifteen Will Get You Twenty is the debut extended play by Canadian pop-punk band, LiveonRelease. The album included five songs off their debut, Seeing Red, and was most likely a promotional EP. The extended play, along with Seeing Red and Goes on a Field Trip, does not show up on sites like eBay or iTunes.

== Track listing ==
1. "I'm Afraid of Britney Spears" – 3:05
2. "Emotional Griptape" – 3:40
3. "Fake"
4. "Johnny Johnny"
5. "Don't Leave Me Alone"
