= Language of Silence =

Studio album by Numb
- Released: November 24, 1998
- Recorded: Chindogu (Vancouver, BC)
- Genre: Electro-industrial
- Length: 61:29
- Label: Metropolis
- Producer: David Collings; Don Gordon

Numb chronology
Desire/Blind Remixes (1998)	Language of Silence (1998)	Mortal Geometry (2019)

Singles from Language of Silence
- 1. "Suspended" Released: November 24, 1998

Language of Silence is the sixth studio album by Numb, released on November 24, 1998 by Metropolis Records. The album was conceived previous to the band's fifth album Blood Meridian but could not be released due to legal issues concerning Numb's label in Europe.

== Reception ==
Professional ratings
Review scores
Source	Rating
AllMusic	4.5/5 stars
Alternative Press	3/5 stars

AllMusic awarded Language of Silence four and a half out of five stars, commending the ominous atmosphere and saying the "synth sounds have been sharpened without losing any of their viciousness, while melodies have matured, forming a new blend that allows the complexities to show through in a way they have not in previous Numb releases." Alternative Press gave the album a positive review, saying "dancefloor consciousness abounds on Language" and that "Numb have cultivated their affection for noise." Michael Mahan of CMJ praised Language of Silence, calling it a "sonically intimidating" album "with mountains of guitar feedback, waves of synthesized chaos and a lion's share of aggressive, angst-ridden vocal terrorism." Ink 19 called the album a masterpiece without shortcomings. Critics at Last Sigh Magazine called it the band's masterpiece, saying "Don Gordon and David Collings come together once more to terrify their audience with the brutal reality of what occurs in everyday life through their undeniably intense and fast-paced beats coupled with a vengeful stream-of-consciousness lyrical rage of such intelligence and imagination it rivals the writings of James Joyce himself."

== Track listing ==
All tracks are written by David Collings and Don Gordon.

No.	Title	Length
1.	"Respect"	5:59
2.	"Suspended"	5:02
3.	"Deviation"	8:04
4.	"Illumination Rounds"	4:27
5.	"No Remorse"	5:47
6.	"Closer"	8:06
7.	"Defiler"	6:14
8.	"Benthos"	4:35
9.	"Immolate"	6:40
10.	"Distorted Relations"	6:34

== Personnel ==
Adapted from the Language of Silence liner notes.

Numb

- David Collings – lead vocals, instruments, production
- Don Gordon – instruments, production

Production and design

- Ken Marshall – engineering (1, 2)
- Tim Oberthier – engineering (3–10)
- Farben+Formen – cover art, illustrations, design
- Craig Waddell – mastering

== Release history ==
Region	Date	Label	Format	Catalog
France	1998	Zoth Ommog	CD, LP	ARTY 15
United States	1998	Metropolis	CD	54102
Bulgaria	1999	Zoth Ommog/Wizard	CS	A 006497, WZO 200.530
