= Bif Naked Forever =

Studio album by Bif Naked
- Released: 4 December 2012
- Genre: Acoustic
- Length: 54:03
- Label: Reliant Music / Warner Music Canada / Her Royal Majesty's Records
- Producer: Bif Naked & Ryan Stewart

Bif Naked chronology
The Promise (2009)	Bif Naked Forever (2012)	Champion (2024)

Bif Naked Forever: Acoustic Hits & Other Delights is an acoustic album by Canadian singer-songwriter Bif Naked, released digitally on 4 December 2012.

== Track listing ==
1. "So Happy I Could Die" ^{[N1]}
2. "The Only One" ^{[N1]}
3. "Spaceman"
4. "Daddy's Getting Married"
5. "My Bike"
6. "October Song"
7. "Nobody Knows" ^{[N1]}
8. "Supergirl"
9. "Moment of Weakness"
10. "Lucky"
11. "Tango Shoes"
12. "Honeybee"
13. "I Love Myself Today"
14. "Chotee"

Note 1. Denotes new studio tracks.
