= Gump =

Gump or Gumps may refer to:

== Arts and entertainment ==
- Forrest Gump, American romantic comedy-drama film based on a Winston Groom novel
- The Gump, fictional character from the Oz series of books
- The Gumps, popular comic strip (1917–1959) by Sidney Smith
  - The Gumps (1931–1937), radio sitcom based on the comic strip
- "Gump", song by "Weird Al" Yankovic on the album Bad Hair Day
- Gump (album), 1991 album by Sons of Freedom
- Gump, an elf in Legend (1985 film)

== People ==
- David Ariail (1910–2001), American college football player nicknamed "Gump"
- Guy Cantrell (1904–1961), American Major League Baseball pitcher nicknamed "Gump"
- Gump Hayes (born 1992), American football player
- Gump Worsley (1929–2007), National Hockey League goaltender, member of the Hockey Hall of Fame
- Carissa Gump (born 1983), American weightlifter
- Scott Gump (born 1965), American golfer
- Frederick Gump (c. 1897-?), 19-year-old kidnapped, sexually assaulted and beaten by Harry Kendall Thaw, the latter better known for fatally shooting Stanford White
- The Gump brothers, German murder suspects

== Other uses ==
- Gump's, luxury American home furnishings and décor retailer founded in 1861
- WGMP, radio station licensed to Montgomery, Alabama, branded as "104.9 The Gump"
- Guiana United Muslim Party, a former political party in Guyana
- GUMPS, acronym used by airplane pilots as a check-list
- Gump (died 2014), the last known Christmas Island forest skink

== See also ==
- Johannes Gumpp (born 1626), Austrian painter
