= Pure (Canadian band) =

Canadian alternative rock band

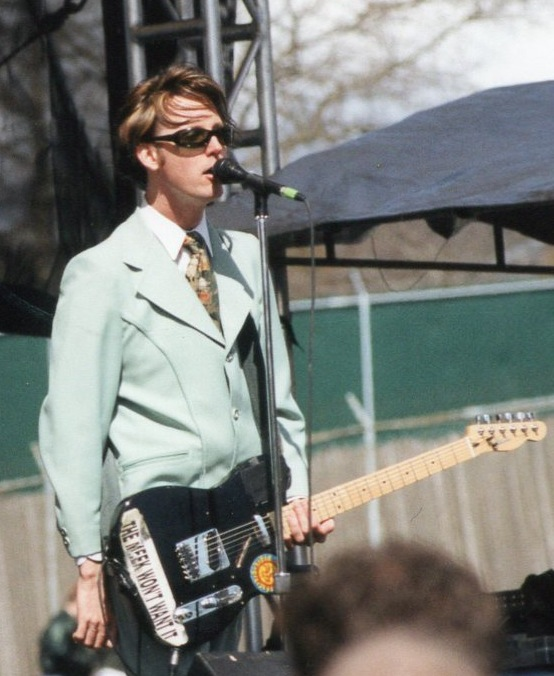
- Jordy Birch performing with Pure in 1993

Background information
- Origin: Vancouver, British Columbia, Canada
- Genres: Alternative rock
- Years active: 1991–2000, 2024–present
- Labels: Reprise, Mammoth, Shag
- Past members: Jordy Birch; Todd Simko; David Hadley; Mark Henning; Leigh Grant; Jim Hobbs

Pure is an alternative rock band, formed in Vancouver in 1991. First signed to the Reprise label by Rob Cavallo and Michael Ostin, the band reached a greater audience once their song "Greedy" was featured on the soundtrack album Songs from the Cool World, and the single "Blast" reached No. 22 on the Billboard Modern Rock chart in 1993. In 2024, Jordy Birch started releasing new music under the Pure name.

== History ==
Jordy Birch and guitarist Todd Simko met in high school and later formed the band with bass guitarist Dave Hadley and drummer Leigh Grant. Grant was replaced in 1996 by Jim Hobbs. Mark R. Henning played keyboards, but left in 1994. Birch, Simko, and Grant had been members of the band After All, which had released one album, 1988's How High the Moon. After All disbanded after vocalist Scott Acomba left the band in 1989, and the remaining members continued as Pure.

The band's original name was "The Grin Factory". The band was discovered at Vancouver's Music West Conference in 1991, when they went there to showcase their demo, impressing amongst others, an executive from Restless Records. They were subsequently signed by Warner/Reprise and the band's song "Greedy" was used in the Ralph Bakshi animated movie Cool World.

=== Pureafunalia ===
In 1992, the band, now named "Pure" (named after the title of one of their songs), released their debut album, Pureafunalia. The album was produced by Talking Heads keyboardist Jerry Harrison. The band's first chart success occurred with the album's lead single, "Blast", which reached No. 1 on the RPM Canadian Content (Cancon) chart. "Blast" also charted in the United States on the Billboard Modern Rock chart in 1993, peaking at No. 22. Another single from the album, "Blissful Kiss", also reached No. 1 on the RPM Cancon chart. In 1993, Pure were nominated for a Juno Award for Most Promising Group of the Year. Later that year, the music video for "Blast" won the award for the "Best Alternative Video" at the 1993 Canadian Music Video Awards.

=== Generation 6 Pack ===
Generation 6 Pack was released in August 1994 and led off with the single "Denial". The band toured relentlessly in the fall and winter of 1994. In January 1995, they played the Big Day Out festival in Australia. Despite this, they were dropped by Warner/Reprise. Pure then started their own record label, Shag Records, and released the song "The Hammock" in the summer of 1995 and Extra Purestrial EP. "Lemonade", the first single, was a hit.

In 1996, Pure re-released Generation 6-Pack on Mammoth as Generation Six-Pack. The album became a Canadian Campus chart in late 1996 hit fueled by the singles "Denial" and "Anna Is A Speed Freak".

=== Feverish ===
On April 14, 1998, Pure released their third full-length album, Feverish. The song "Tennis Ball" was featured in the movie BASEketball, though not featured on the soundtrack.

The group disbanded in 2000, citing "musical differences", and Birch embarked on a solo career with the single "Moola Moola" charting in Canada. In 2008, he formed Guilty About Girls with bassist Mark R. Henning and drummer/DJ Lucas T. Poth. In 2015, he formed a new group called The Wivez and is still releasing on new Pure material.

Todd Simko played on Bif Naked's first album which was released in 1995, and worked as a successful record producer/engineer in Vancouver, British Columbia and made records with such artists as Marcy Playground, Xavier Rudd, The Salteens, The Organ, Big John Bates, The Yoko Casionos, Current Swell, Patrick Brealey, and Sean Macdonald, plus many others. Simko died at the age of 45 when he went missing and was presumed drowned on April 22, 2012.

Mark R. Henning formed Vancouver PowerPop trio Blisterene in 1995 which released the full-length CD So I Have Them in 1997 on the Poncy Rocket/IMD label. By 2007, Henning formed a new group Combine the Victorious with fashion designer Isabelle Dunlop. They released their debut CD The World Over independently. Combine the Victorious later signed to the Boutique Empire label.

== Discography ==
=== Singles ===
- "Blast" (Warner/Reprise, 1992)
- "Greedy" (The Morphine Mix)/Laughing Like A Fiend (The Mammoth Version) (Warner/Reprise, 1992)
- "Spiritual Pollution" (Warner/Reprise, 1993)
- "Blissful Kiss" (Warner/Reprise, 1993)
- "Pure" (Warner/Reprise, 1993)
- "Denial" (Warner/Reprise, 1994)
- "Anna Is A Speed Freak" (Warner/Reprise, 1994)
- "The Hammock" (Warner/Reprise, 1995)
- "Lemonade" (Shag/Outside, 1995)
- "Baba O'Riley" (Shag/Outside, 1995)
- "Chocolate Bar" (Mammoth, 1998)
- "Feverish" (Mammoth, 1998)
- "Swinger" (Mammoth, 1998)
- "Issues" (VanCityRecords)

=== Albums and EPs ===
- Greed (Reprise, 1992) - EP
- Pureafunalia (Reprise, 1992)
- Generation 6-Pack (Reprise, 1994)
- Generation Six-Pack (Mammoth, 1996)
- Extra Purestrial (Shag, 1995) - EP
- Feverish (Mammoth, 1998)
