= Seeing Red (album) =

Studio album by LiveonRelease
- Released: 2001
- Genre: Pop punk
- Length: 32:24
- Label: Her Royal Majesty's Records
- Producers: Bif Naked and LiveonRelease

LiveonRelease chronology
Seeing Red (2001)	Goes on a Field Trip (2003)

Professional ratings
Review scores
Source	Rating
Allmusic	3/5 stars

Seeing Red is the debut album by Canadian pop-punk band LiveonRelease, released by Her Royal Majesty's Records in 2001.

== Track listing ==
1. "Don't Leave Me Alone" – 2:31
2. "Hardcore" – 4:00
3. "Johnny Johnny" – 3:08
4. "Emotional Griptape" – 3:40
5. "Slow Down" – 2:53
6. "I'm Afraid of Britney Spears" – 3:05
7. "All Night Long" – 6:33
8. "Get with It" – 2:28
9. "Fake" – 4:22
10. "Why" – 3:01
11. "Dirt" – 3:00
