= The Promise (Bif Naked album) =

Studio album by Bif Naked
- Released: May 5, 2009
- Recorded: March – September 2008
- Genre: Alternative rock
- Length: 48:49
- Label: Her Royal Majesty's Records; International Arts Music
- Producer: Jason Darr

Bif Naked chronology
Superbeautifulmonster (2005)	The Promise (2009)	Bif Naked Forever (2012)

Professional ratings
Review scores
Source	Rating
Ground Control	(favorable)

The Promise is the sixth studio album by Canadian singer-songwriter Bif Naked, released in 2009.

== Track listing ==
Unless otherwise noted, all songs composed by Bif Naked and Jason Darr.

1. "Crash and Burn" – 3:33
2. "Sick" – 3:40
3. "Bluejay" – 3:54
4. "Fuck You 2" (Jason Darr) – 3:14
5. "Honeybee" – 2:53
6. "You'll Never Know" (Jason Darr/Brian Howes/Jacen Ekstrom/Mike Sweeney/Jamie Warren) – 2:53
7. "My Innocence" (Bif Naked/Curt Frasca/Sabelle Breer) – 3:28
8. "Red Flag" (Bif Naked/Peter Karroll/Doug Fury) – 3:26
9. "Ciao, Bella" – 4:05
10. "King of Karma" (Bif Naked/Peter Karroll/Doug Fury) – 3:14
11. "Amazon Motel" (Bif Naked/Peter Karroll/Doug Fury) – 3:43
12. "River of Fire" – 3:45
13. "Welcome to the End" (Bif Naked/Peter Karroll/Doug Fury) – 3:58
14. "Save Your Breath" 3:04 (digital download edition bonus track)

== Personnel ==
- Bif Naked - Vocals
- Jason Darr - Guitars and programming
- Hansel Funke - Bass
- Locutis - Drums
- John Webster - Additional Keyboards
