= Blood Music =

Blood Music may refer to:

- Blood Music (novel), a 1985 science fiction novel by Greg Bear
- Blood Music (Chapterhouse album)
- Blood Music (Dead Celebrity Status album)
- Blood Music (record label)
