= Koro (album) =

Live album by Numb
- Released: 1996
- Recorded: December 2 – December 3, 1995
- Studio: Shelter & The Loft (Tokyo, JP)
- Genre: Electro-industrial
- Length: 65:47
- Label: Gift

Numb chronology
Wasted Sky (1994)	Koro (1996)	Blood Meridian (1997)

Koro is a live album by Numb, released in 1996 by Gift Records.

== Reception ==
Professional ratings
Review scores
Source	Rating
AllMusic	3/5 stars

Jason Ankeny of AllMusic awarded Koro three out of five stars. Sonic Boom praised the band for sounding even more successful in a live setting, saying "the amount of power and emotion that David Collings brings with his vocals and the atmosphere that Don is able to create with his mixture of guitar and keyboards throughout will definitely make you wish that you could see them live, even if you already have."

== Track listing ==
All tracks are written by Don Gordon and Conan Hunter, except where noted.

No.	Title	Writer(s)	Length
1.	"Ratblast"		4:59
2.	"Right"		4:07
3.	"Hole"		4:41
4.	"Driven"		4:52
5.	"Frantic"	Gordon, David Hall, Blair Dobson	3:45
6.	"Effigy"		5:39
7.	"Wasted Sky"		4:37
8.	"Painless"		3:14
9.	"Dead Inside"	Gordon, Hall, Dobson	4:01
10.	"Shithammer"		7:16
11.	"God Is Dead"	Gordon, Hall, Sean Stubbs	4:29
12.	"Curse"		7:36
13.	"Blood"		6:32

== Personnel ==
Adapted from the Koro liner notes.

Numb

- David Collings – lead vocals, keyboards, percussion, mixing
- Don Gordon – guitar, keyboards, percussion, mixing

Additional musicians

- Richard Hanley – drums, electronic percussion

Production and design

- Kohei Amano – recording
- Satoshi Kanamoto – engineering
- MMM Graphics – cover art, design

== Release history ==
Region	Date	Label	Format	Catalog
Japan	1996	Gift	CD	GFT-03
