= Numb (Numb album) =

Studio album by Numb
- Released: 1987
- Recorded: August 1986 – July 1987
- Studio: Various: Limited Vision Studio; (Vancouver, BC); Mushroom Studios; (Vancouver, BC); Numbworks; (Vancouver, BC)
- Genre: Electro-industrial
- Length: 46:19
- Label: Edge/World
- Producer: Don Gordon; David Hall; Sean Stubbs

Numb chronology
Numb (1987)	Christmeister (1989)

Alternative cover
- 1997 reissue cover

Numb is the eponymously-titled debut studio album of Numb, released in 1987 by Edge and World Records.

== Reception ==
Professional ratings
Review scores
Source	Rating
AllMusic	3/5 stars

John Bush of AllMusic says "with its periodic stabs of metallic guitars, Numb's 1987 self-titled debut album is strongly reminiscent of two other bands who share their hometown, Front Line Assembly and Skinny Puppy."

== Track listing ==
All tracks are written by Don Gordon, David Hall and Sean Stubbs, except "God Is Dead", "Eat Me" and "Two Faces" by Anthony Valcic

Side one
No.	Title	Length
1.	"God Is Dead"	4:19
2.	"Eat Me"	6:26
3.	"Lies"	5:19
4.	"Guilt"	7:13

Side two
No.	Title	Length
1.	"The Hanging Key"	6:14
2.	"Two Faces"	4:46
3.	"The Morality of Altitude"	6:34
4.	"Blue Light, Black Candle"	5:03

1992 KK Records reissue
No.	Title	Length
1.	"God Is Dead"	4:20
2.	"Eat Me"	6:28
3.	"Lies"	5:20
4.	"Guilt"	6:59
5.	"The Hanging Key"	6:16
6.	"Two Faces"	4:49
7.	"The Morality of Altitude"	6:29
8.	"Blue Light, Black Candle"	5:06
9.	"Endless Descent"	4:13
10.	"Carcinoma Angels"	4:17

1997 Metropolis reissue
No.	Title	Length
1.	"God Is Dead"	4:20
2.	"Eat Me"	6:28
3.	"Lies"	5:22
4.	"Guilt"	7:06
5.	"The Hanging Key"	6:17
6.	"Two Faces"	4:48
7.	"The Morality of Altitude"	6:30
8.	"Blue Light, Black Candle"	5:09
9.	"Carcinoma Angels"	4:19
10.	"Cell"	3:34
11.	"Endless Descent"	4:13
12.	"Fragmentation Ballet"	3:51

== Personnel ==
Adapted from the Numb liner notes.

Numb

- Don Gordon – instruments, production, arrangements
- David Hall (as Daivd Hall) – instruments, production, arrangements
- Sean Stubbs (Sean St. Hubbs) – instruments, production, arrangements

Production and design

- Ric Arboit – engineering
- Tom Ferris – engineering
- Dave Ogilvie – engineering
- Gord Martin – photography
- John Robert Mingo – photography
- Cal Stephenson – engineering
- Greg Sykes – design, typesetting
- Anthony Valcic – engineering, photography, production and arrangements (A1, A2, B2)

== Release history ==
Region	Date	Label	Format	Catalog
Canada	1987	Edge/World	CS, LP	EDG 003, WRC1-5680
France	1987	Lively Art	LP	ARTY 3
United States	1992	KK	CD	KK 085
United States	1997	Metropolis	CD	MET 071
