= Cowboys and Cadillacs =

Studio album by Jaydee Bixby
- Released: July 8, 2008
- Genre: Country
- Length: 41:47
- Label: Her Royal Majesty's Records
- Producer: Bill Buckingham; John Webster

Jaydee Bixby chronology
Cowboys and Cadillacs (2008)	Easy to Love (2010)

Singles from Cowboys and Cadillacs
- 1. "Old Fashioned Girl" Released: June 17, 2008; 2. "Boys in the Band" Released: September 25, 2008; 3. "Broken Windows" Released: March 17, 2009; 4. "My So Called Life" Released: August 23, 2009

Professional ratings
Review scores
Source	Rating
Allmusic	3.5/5 stars

Cowboys and Cadillacs is the debut album of country singer Jaydee Bixby, who was the runner-up on the fifth season of Canadian Idol. The album was released in Canada on July 8, 2008. The first single from the album, "Old Fashioned Girl", was released on iTunes on June 17, 2008.

== Background ==
Jaydee placed second on the fifth season of Canadian Idol. After the show, he signed to Her Royal Majesty's Records in early 2008. The album was recorded in Vancouver, and released on July 8, 2008.

Jaydee released three more singles from this album, including "Boys in the Band", "Broken Windows" and "My So Called Life". Jaydee left the label in early 2010 and signed with On Ramp Records for his second album, Easy to Love.

== Track listing ==
No.	Title	Writer(s)	Length
1.	"Old Fashioned Girl"	Jason Mowery, Bruce Walker	3:07
2.	"Cowboys and Cadillacs"	Don McLeod	3:59
3.	"Love Is"	Jaydee Bixby, Anet Ducharme, Jimm Zee	3:07
4.	"Broken Windows"	Walker, Liz Rose	3:35
5.	"Boys in the Band"	Troy Olsen, Marv Green	3:50
6.	"Run Away"	AJ Woodworth, Bill Buckingham, Bixby	3:11
7.	"My So Called Life"	Sean Patrick McGraw	3:12
8.	"Somewhere Tonight"	Peter Karroll, Bixby	3:08
9.	"Slow Me Down"	Gerald O'Brien, Walker	3:16
10.	"Hard to Love You"	Natalye Vivian, Kirby Kaye	3:35
11.	"I Am Ready Whenever You Are"	Ashe Underwood, Lisa Brokop, Ron Irvinge	3:01
12.	"Break It to Them Gently"	Burton Cummings	4:38

== Chart performance ==
The album sold over 21,000 copies in Canada. The album peaked at number 8 on the Canadian Albums Chart.

Chart (2008)	Peak position
Canadian Albums Chart	8
