= LiveonRelease =

Canadian pop punk band

- Origin: Vancouver, British Columbia, Canada
- Genre: Pop punk
- Years active: 2000–2003
- Labels: WM Canada; Her Royal Majesty's
- Past members: Brittin Karroll; Colette Trudeau; Felicity Herst; Leah Emmott

LiveonRelease was a Canadian all-girl pop punk band from Vancouver, British Columbia, formed 2000 and broke up in 2003. The name LiveonRelease originates from basketball jargon.

In 2001, they released Seeing Red, which included the singles "I'm Afraid of Britney Spears", "Get With It", and "Emotional Griptape". "I'm Afraid of Britney Spears" also appeared on the Dude, Where's My Car? soundtrack.

In 2003, they released their second album Goes on a Fieldtrip, which included the single "Let's Go". Their second CD is produced by Peter Karroll & Doug Fury Inc, with the executive producer being Bif Naked. This CD was mixed by Shaun Thingvold.

LiveonRelease disbanded shortly after the release of Goes on a Fieldtrip.

== Members ==
- Colette Trudeau: vocals
- Brittin Karroll: lead guitar
- Foxx Herst: bass guitar
- Leah Emmott: drums

== Discography ==
=== Studio albums ===
- Seeing Red (2001, includes singles, "I'm Afraid of Britney Spears", "Emotional Griptape" and "Get With It")
- Goes on a Field Trip (2003, includes singles, Let's Go and is an enhanced CD featuring music videos of "Let's Go" and "Emotional Griptape".)

=== EP ===
- Fifteen Will Get You Twenty (2002, includes re-recorded and re-mastered songs from off of Seeing Red)

=== Single ===
- "I'm Afraid of Britney Spears" appears on the Dude, Where's My Car? soundtrack.

=== Music videos ===
Year	Song	Director(s)
2001	"I'm Afraid Of Britney Spears"	Warren Sonoda
2002	"Emotional Griptape"	Neill Blomkamp
2002	"Get With It"	Warren Sonoda
2003	"Let's Go"	

== See also ==
- List of bands from British Columbia
- List of bands from Canada
