= Death on the Installment Plan (album) =

Studio album by Numb
- Released: February 22, 1993
- Recorded: January 1992
- Studios: Mushroom Studios (Vancouver, BC)
- Genre: Electro-industrial
- Length: 58:48
- Labels: KK
- Producers: Don Gordon; Conan Hunter

Numb chronology
| Fixate (1993) | Death on the Installment Plan (1993) | Wasted Sky (1994) |

Death on the Installment Plan is the third studio album by Numb, released on February 22, 1993 by KK Records. A re-issue was released a few months later on July 19 by Re-Constriction Records.

== Music and lyrics ==
The lyrics of Death on the Installment Plan are about the concept of government sanctioned death and inside the album's booklet there are several dates representing the executions of serial killers in North America. Concerning the music, composer Don Gordon has said that he emphasized song structure and used straight forward drum patterns and standard dance style tempos to engage listeners. When asked about the album's title, Gordon stated:

Death on the Installment Plan was a piece of literature that I read years ago. It was actually two books, the other being Journey to the End of the Night by Céline, a well-known French author. That book always made a large impact on me and as it stuck around inside my head I realized that it could also be applied in a much difference context than when he applied it when he named his book. Hence that was why it was used as a title of an album. It was the whole concept of monthly installment plans, a type of 'Buy Now, Pay Later' mentality that really struck me. That so much of what we do is aimed at both short and long time death. It just felt appropriate. The album used the theme a great deal in the lyrics and especially the artwork. There are things about HIV, a Dow Chemical accident in India, as well as other corporate sponsored wholesale items concerning death.

== Reception ==
Aiding & Abetting gave Death on the Installment Plan a positive review, calling it "floor-ready death, with the proper amounts of distortion and aggression" and that "manage[s] to assault the eardrums with a barrage worthy of airplay." A critic for Keyboard agreed, saying "buried beneath layers of chaos, there is real craftsmanship in Death" and "ultimately, Numb will reward those who seek artistic illumination in the darkest shadows of our psyches." Staci Bonner of Spin praised the album's haunting atmosphere and called it "a disc full of distorted vocals and insane-sounding tape loops, strung together to convey deep, morbid concepts." She went on to say "Numb's not the first band to try such a thing, but it handles the task with skill — crafting hard edges and sounds which are luridly inviting, like a haunted church."

== Track listing ==
All tracks are written by Don Gordon and Conan Hunter.

| No. | Title | Length |
|---|---|---|
| 1. | "Violence" | 1:12 |
| 2. | "Hole" | 5:08 |
| 3. | "Curse" | 7:03 |
| 4. | "Trial" | 6:12 |
| 5. | "Painless" | 3:37 |
| 6. | "Right..." | 4:07 |
| 7. | "Shithammer" | 7:33 |
| 8. | "A Dead Place" | 6:16 |
| 9. | "Decay of the Angel" | 4:46 |
| 10. | "Headcrash" | 5:48 |
| 11. | "Fugue" | 2:02 |
| 12. | "Revenant" | 5:03 |

== Personnel ==
Adapted from the Death on the Installment Plan liner notes.

Numb

- Don Gordon – production, mixing, editing
- Conan Hunter – lead vocals, production, mixing, editing

Additional musicians

- Ken Marshall – electronics, recording, mixing
- Brad Mitchell (as Brad Facepuller) – additional percussion (8)
- Thighmaster – bass guitar (10)

Production and design

- Brian Gardner – mastering
- Fitz – photography
- Steakface – cover art
- Anthony Valcic – editing

== Release history ==
| Region | Date | Label | Format | Catalog |
|---|---|---|---|---|
| 1993 | Belgium | KK | CD, CS | KK 095 |
| 1993 | United States | Re-Constriction | CD, CS | REC-005 |
