= Spaceman (Bif Naked song) =

Single by Bif Naked

from the album I Bificus
- Released: 1998
- Genre: Alternative rock
- Length: 4:21; 3:42 (U.S. Edit)
- Label: Aquarius/EMI (CAN); Lava/Atlantic (U.S.)
- Songwriter(s): Peter Karroll, Bif Naked
- Producer(s): Glenn Rosenstein

Bif Naked singles chronology
"Everything" (1995)	"Spaceman" (1998)	"Chotee" (1998)

"Spaceman" is the first single from Canadian singer Bif Naked's third album, I Bificus. The song peaked at #36 on Canada's RPM singles chart.

== Boomtang Boys mix ==
In 1998, Canadian group The Boomtang Boys created a remixed dance version of the song, which reached #2 on the Canadian Singles Chart.
