= Project Wyze =

Canadian rap metal band

- Origin: Sudbury, Ontario, Canada
- Genres: Nu metal; rap metal; hip-hop (early)
- Years active: 1988–2003
- Label: Sony (Canada)
- Spinoffs: Dead Celebrity Status
- Past members: Yas Taalat; Bobby McIntosh; Adam Arsenault; Tye Thomas; Sasha Kosovic; Brad Dean; Elie Abdelnour

Project Wyze was a Canadian rap metal band active from 1988 until 2003, when its founding members went on to pursue the project Dead Celebrity Status.

== History ==
The MCs Yas Taalat and Bobby McIntosh started out as a hip-hop duo under the name Project Wyze in 1988, when they were teenagers in Sudbury, Ontario, Canada. They began establishing a reputation in the underground hip-hop scene by opening for acts such as Dream Warriors, Maestro Fresh Wes, and Michie Mee. They were also one of the first Canadian groups to open for the American hip-hop group Public Enemy.

The pair subsequently moved to London, Ontario, after high school. In 1995, Taalat and McIntosh were invited to perform with a punk rock band, and the two entities eventually merged, evolving into a rap rock band that included Adam Arsenault on guitar and Tye Thomas on bass. They released their debut EP, Trapz of Poetic Poison, on an indie label in 1996. Project Wyze toured the United States in 1998, performing with artists like Papa Roach and the Step Kings.

The band subsequently enlisted guitarist Sasha Kosovic, drummer Brad Dean, and bassist Elie Abdelnour. In 2000, Project Wyze issued the EP Only If I Knew. Growing record sales and an expanding fan base grabbed the attention of major labels, leading to a recording contract with Sony Music, under which the band released their major-label debut, misfits.strangers.liars.friends, in 2001, which spawned the singles "Nothing's What It Seems" and "Room to Breathe". misfits.strangers.liars.friends reached No. 95 on the Canadian Albums Chart. That year, the band performed at Edgefest II in Toronto.

The original founders of Project Wyze, Taalat and McIntosh, went on to form the side project Dead Celebrity Status in 2003.

== Discography ==
- Trapz of Poetic Poison (EP, 1996)
- Only If I Knew (EP, 1999)
- misfits.strangers.liars.friends (2001)
