= Fixate (EP) =

EP by Numb
- Released: 1993
- Studio: Various: Mushroom Studios; (Vancouver, BC); Circolo Degli Artisti; (Rome, ITL); De Vlerk; (Rotterdam, NL); Barbue; (Copenhagen, DK)
- Genre: Electro-industrial
- Length: 35:42
- Label: KK
- Producer: Don Gordon; Conan Hunter; Ken Marshall

Numb chronology
Christmeister (1989)	Fixate (1993)	Death on the Installment Plan (1993)

Fixate is an EP by Numb, released in 1993 by KK Records. The EP contains a different version of "Ratblast" performed at double tempo, which normally how the band performed the song live. "Headcrash (Skullcrusher)" is Don Gordon's personal favorite track on the release.

== Track listing ==
All tracks are written by Don Gordon and Conan Hunter, except "Frantic" by Blair Dobson and David Hall

No.	Title	Length
1.	"Right (Amphetamine Psychosis)"	4:35
2.	"Right (Santa Sangre)"	4:43
3.	"La Neante"	3:54
4.	"Ratblast" (Live in Rotterdam)	6:22
5.	"Frantic" (Live in Rome)	3:29
6.	"Painless" (Live in Copenhagen)	3:22
7.	"Curse" (Metastasizing Dub)	5:41
8.	"Headcrash (Skullcrusher)"	3:36

== Personnel ==
Adapted from the Fixate liner notes.

Numb

- Don Gordon – instruments, production and editing (1–3, 7, 8), illustrations
- Conan Hunter – lead vocals, instruments, production and editing (1–3, 7, 8), illustrations

Additional musicians

- Richard Hanley – additional percussion

Production and design

- Fitz – photography
- Ken Marshall – production (1, 2, 7, 8), recording and mixing (4–6)
- Steakface – cover art, design
- Anthony Valcic – editing (7, 8)
- Craig Waddell – editing (4–6)

== Release history ==
Region	Date	Label	Format	Catalog
Belgium	1993	KK	CD	KK 094
