= Superbeautifulmonster =

Studio album by Bif Naked
- Released: June 28, 2005
- Length: 45:24
- Label: Her Royal Majesty's; Warner
- Producer: Dave Fortman, Kevin Kadish*

Bif Naked chronology
Purge (2001)	Superbeautifulmonster (2005)	The Promise (2009)

Professional ratings
Review scores
Source	Rating
AllMusic	3/5 stars

Superbeautifulmonster is the fourth studio album by Canadian singer Bif Naked, released in Canada on June 28, 2005, and in the US on September 20, 2005. The album's lead single, "Let Down", was a moderate hit in Canada, peaking at No. 20 on Canada's Rock chart.

== Track listing ==
1. "Abandonment" (Bif Naked, Jimmy Allen, Peter Karroll) – 3:12
2. "Let Down" (Kevin Kadish) – 2:44
3. "Everyday" (Naked, Kadish) – 3:25
4. "Yeah, You" (Naked, Allen) – 3:43
5. "That's Life" (Naked, John Dexter, Karroll) – 2:45
6. "Nothing Else Matters" (James Hetfield, Lars Ulrich) – 4:41
7. "I Want" (Naked, Karroll, Doug Fury) – 2:23
8. "Funeral of a Good Grrl" (Naked, Kadish) – 2:36
9. "Henry" (Naked, Karroll) – 3:54
10. "The World Is Over" (Naked, Karroll) – 2:47
11. "The Question Song" (Naked, Karroll, Fury) – 4:17
12. "Ladybug Waltz" (Naked, Karroll, Fury) – 3:59
13. "After a While" (Naked, Karroll, Fury) – 4:51

== Credits ==
- Bif Naked - vocals, background vocals
- Todd Kerns - guitar, bass, background vocals
- Doug Fury - guitar, bass, programming
- Scotty Sexx - live drums
- John Webster - keyboards/strings, programming
- Mike Norman - programming
- Kevin Kadish - guitar, programming
- Jack Daley - bass, Minimoog
- Dave Baron - keyboards
- Denny Weston Jr. - drums
- Aaron Gainer - studio drums
- Dave Fortman - bass
- Kevin Dorr - bass
- David Hodges - keyboards/strings

=== Production ===
- Producer: Peter Karroll, Kevin Kadish, Dave Fortman
- Mixing: Paul Silveira
- Engineers: Paul Silveira, Aaron Nordean, Rob Stefanson, Kevin Kadish, Jeremy Parker, Wes Fontenot
