= Wasted Sky =

Studio album by Numb
- Released: June 15, 1994
- Recorded: June – July 1994
- Studio: Various: Mushroom Studios; (Vancouver, BC); Squelch Sound
- Genre: Electro-industrial
- Length: 52:08
- Label: KK
- Producer: Don Gordon; Conan Hunter; Ken Marshall

Numb chronology
Death on the Installment Plan (1993)	Wasted Sky (1994)	Koro (1996)

Wasted Sky is the fourth studio album by Numb, released on June 15, 1994 by KK Records. The band changed musical direction by dampening processing and effects with the intention of exploring a different emotional intensity with their music. The album was reissued by Metropolis Records in July 1995.

== Reception ==
A critic at Sonic Boom called Wasted Sky an impressive album that "intelligently uses guitars to accentuate the music."

== Track listing ==
All tracks are written by Don Gordon and Conan Hunter, except "Keyak" by Ken Marshall

No.	Title	Length
1.	"Wasted Sky"	5:13
2.	"Blood"	7:14
3.	"Driven"	4:57
4.	"Keyak"	4:22
5.	"Ophelia"	5:37
6.	"Ratblast"	5:03
7.	"Smile"	6:01
8.	"Effigy"	6:22
9.	"Seven Types of Ambiguity"	7:18

== Personnel ==
Adapted from the Wasted Sky liner notes.

Numb

- Don Gordon – instruments, production
- Conan Hunter – lead vocals, instruments, production

Production and design

- Bie Aem Dee – cover art, design
- Fitz – photography
- Brian Gardner – mastering
- Peter Hoste – cover art, design
- Ken Marshall – production

== Release history ==
Region	Date	Label	Format	Catalog
Belgium	1994	KK	CD, CS	KK 126
United States	1995	Metropolis	CD	MET 010
United States	2017	Metropolis	LP	MET 010
