= Christmeister =

Studio album by Numb
- Released: 1989
- Recorded: May – July 1989
- Studio: Various: Numbworks; (Vancouver, BC); Profile Sound Studios; (Vancouver, BC); Vancouver Studios; (Vancouver, BC)
- Genre: Electro-industrial, Industrial rock
- Length: 40:27
- Label: Lively Art
- Producer: Don Gordon; David Hall; Blair Dobson

Numb chronology
Numb (1987)	Christmeister (1989)	Fixate (1993)

Singles from Christmeister
- 1. "Bliss" Released: 1991

Christmeister is the second studio album by Numb, released in 1989 by Lively Art. The album was re-issued in August 1990 by Oceana Records.

== Reception ==
Professional ratings
Review scores
Source	Rating
AllMusic	4.5/5 stars

Allmusic awarded Christmeister four and a half out of five possible stars. A critic for High Fidelity News and Record Review noted the complexity of the work, stating "the bass and percussion are kept busy throughout, forming a foundation for all manner of thrash-esque touches - but it's too deliberate and 'crafted' to be written off as merely anarchic." Sonic Boom praised the album and said "there always seems to be as much going on in the foreground as there is in the background, which gives this album the illusion that it actually contains more music than it should."

Christmeister was rated one of the Top-10 most ‘important’ industrial albums by Alternative Press Magazine (in 2000).

== Track listing ==
All tracks are written by Don Gordon, David Hall and Blair Dobson

No.	Title	Length
1.	"Dead Inside"	3:58
2.	"Cash"	5:18
3.	"Bliss"	5:22
4.	"Balance of Terror"	4:50
5.	"Eugene"	4:18
6.	"Frantic"	3:01
7.	"What"	4:25
8.	"Christmeister"	4:49
9.	"Flesh"	4:55

1996 Metropolis reissue
No.	Title	Length
1.	"Dead Inside"	3:58
2.	"Cash"	5:18
3.	"Bliss"	5:22
4.	"Balance of Terror"	4:50
5.	"Eugene"	4:18
6.	"Frantic"	3:01
7.	"What"	4:25
8.	"Christmeister"	4:49
9.	"Flesh"	4:55
10.	"Bliss (Endurance)"	5:30
11.	"Bliss (In Absentia)"	5:03
12.	"Bliss (Fundamentalist)"	4:37
13.	"Stiff"	3:59

== Personnel ==
Adapted from the Christmeister liner notes.

Numb

- Blair Dobson (musician) – Vocals, production
- Don Gordon – instruments, production
- David Hall – instruments, production

Production and design

- Ian Noble – additional percussion
- Patrice – photography
- Joe Payne – cover art, design
- Greg Reely – editing
- Anthony Valcic – production

== Release history ==
Region	Date	Label	Format	Catalog
France	1989	Lively Art	CD, LP	ARTY 15
United States	1989	Oceana	CS	54102
United States	1990	Oceana	CD	54102
