= Purge (Bif Naked album) =

Studio album by Bif Naked
- Released: September 4, 2001
- Genre: Indie rock
- Length: 53:19
- Label: Lava
- Producer: Desmond Child; Peter Karroll

Bif Naked chronology
| I Bificus (1998) | Purge (2001) | Superbeautifulmonster (2005) |

Professional ratings
Review scores
| Source | Rating |
|---|---|
| AllMusic | 4/5 stars |

Purge is the fourth album by Canadian singer-songwriter Bif Naked, released in 2001. The album featured the hit single "I Love Myself Today". In 2002, the song "Dawn" was featured in the film American Psycho 2. The songs "Regular Guy" and "Tango Shoes" were featured in Project Gotham Racing 2. Meanwhile, "Leader" also appeared in SSX Tricky, where Bif Naked provided the voice for the character Zoe Payne.

In 2021, "I Love Myself Today" was used as a lip sync number in a second season episode of Canada's Drag Race, in which Bif Naked appeared as a guest judge.

== Track listing ==
1. "Choking on the Truth" (Fury, Karroll, Naked) – 3:38
2. "Tango Shoes" (Fury, Karroll, Naked) – 3:47
3. "Dawn" (Karroll, Naked) – 3:34
4. "I Love Myself Today" (Bazilian, Child, Naked) – 3:30
5. "Stolen Sidewalk" (Karroll, Naked) – 4:33
6. "October Song" (Fury, Karroll, Naked) – 3:27
7. "Leader" (Fury, Naked) – 3:33
8. "You Are the Master" (Karroll, Naked) – 4:00
9. "Regular Guy" (Karroll, Naked) – 3:17
10. "Hold On" (Karroll, Naked) – 3:26
11. "Story of My Life" (Fury, Naked) – 3:40
12. "Religion" (Karroll, Naked) – 12:54†
13. "Untitled" (None) – 00:04‡

†Hidden Track "I Love Myself Today [Misera Remix]" (Bazilian, Child, Naked, Misera) – 6:28
‡Some pressings contain a thirteenth track that is nothing but 4 seconds of silence.

== Personnel ==
- Bif Naked – vocals, background vocals
- Pete Amato – keyboards
- Randy Cantor – Hammond organ
- Desmond Child – background vocals
- Jules Gondar – background vocals
- Peter Karroll – bass guitar, guitar
- Kenny Olson – guitar
- Thommy Price – drums, background vocals
- Kasim Sulton – bass, background vocals

== Production ==
- Producers: Desmond Child, Peter Karroll
- Engineers: Rob Eaton, Jules Gondar, Craig Lozowick, Nathan Malki, Germán Ortiz
- Mixing: Peter Karroll
- Mastering: Andy VanDette

== Charts ==
| Chart (2001) | Peak position |
|---|---|
| Canadian Albums (Billboard) | 8 |

=== Year-end charts ===
| Chart (2002) | Position |
|---|---|
| Canadian Alternative Albums (Nielsen SoundScan) | 123 |

== Certifications ==
| Region | Certification | Certified units/sales |
|---|---|---|
| Canada (Music Canada) | Gold | 50,000^{^} |
^{^} Shipments figures based on certification alone.
