= Brian Melo =

- Brian Melo performing in Winona, Ontario in 2007.

Background information
- Born: August 15, 1982 (age 44); Hamilton, Ontario, Canada
- Genres: Pop, rock
- Occupation: Singer
- Instruments: Vocals, guitar, piano
- Years active: 2007–present
- Labels: Sony, Rat Pack, Fontana North, Universal
- Website: www.brianmelo.com

Brian Melo (born August 15, 1982) is a Canadian singer-songwriter from Hamilton, Ontario who was the winner of the fifth season of Canadian Idol in 2007. His first studio album, Livin' It, achieved Gold Status in Canada. His second album, The Truth, was released October 2010.

== Biography ==
=== Early life ===
Brian Melo was born in the East End of Hamilton, Ontario to Maria and Augusto Melo, immigrants from São Miguel, Portugal. He is a graduate of Cathedral High School. He professionally trained vocals at the Royans School for the Musical Performing Arts, which also featured Our Lady Peace frontman Raine Maida. In 1997, Melo sang back-up for Shania Twain as part of a choir and from 2003 he was the lead singer for Hamilton, Ontario alternative/indie band Stoked with guitarist Joe Cacioppo, bassist Rick Fazendeiro, and drummer Paul Fontes.

=== Canadian Idol 2007 ===
At the time of his Idol audition, Melo was still living in Hamilton and working as a construction worker. He had auditioned for previous seasons of Canadian Idol but had never made it past the judges. In early 2007, he was encouraged by both his best friend Kevin Craig and his brothers Larry and Dave Melo to try again in Toronto. His audition was the first one shown in the television broadcast.

During the finals of the competition, the judges all praised Melo for his emotional performances and his command of the stage. After his performance of "Karma Police" by Radiohead in the Top 5 episode, the audience and judges gave him a standing ovation, with Jake Gold remarking, "I just hope the people at home understand what they just saw. One of the most magic [sic] moments ever on this show." Zack Werner added, "Mr. and Mrs. Melo, your son very well may be the next Canadian Idol. You [Brian] give credibility to the whole damn franchise."

Many of the special guest judges spoke very highly of Brian Melo during the show:

- Brian May of Queen was very impressed with up and coming star. "Brian Melo is the real deal", he commented live on the show.
- Grammy Winning Vocalist Enrique Iglesias said "It feels as if Brian Melo already has millions of fans out there."
- Kelly Clarkson was overheard saying she "loved the raspiness in his vocals."

On September 11, 2007, Melo won Canadian Idol, despite having been considered the "dark horse" at the start of the competition, and having landed in the "Bottom Three" three times. He beat Jaydee Bixby for the title, who had never been in the bottom three throughout the entire series.

The finale was viewed by more than 2 million Canadians, and approximately 5 million votes were cast, the most in Canadian Idol history. Brian won by a landslide, with a CTV official stating about the vote difference, "With respect to Brian and Jaydee, the margin is significant enough that out of respect for Jaydee we will not release it."

His first single, "All I Ever Wanted", was released at 12:00 am on September 13, 2007. The song is also featured on his debut album, Livin' It, which was released on November 27, 2007.

=== Canadian Idol performances ===
Week	Song	Artist	Status
Top 22	"Stereo"	The Watchmen	Advanced
Top 18	"Angels"	Robbie Williams	Bottom 4
Top 14	"Drive"	Incubus	Advanced
Top 10	"If You Could Only See"	Tonic	Safe
Top 9	"Bold As Love"	Jimi Hendrix	Bottom 2
Top 8	"She Talks to Angels"	The Black Crowes	Safe
Top 7	"Too Much Love Will Kill You"	Queen	Bottom 2
Top 6	"The Dolphin's Cry"	Live	Safe
Top 5	"Karma Police"	Radiohead	Safe
Top 4	"Mack the Knife" "Feeling Good"	Bobby Darin; Michael Bublé	Safe
Top 3	"Whiter Shade of Pale" "Lightning Crashes"	Procol Harum; Live	Safe
Finale	"This Ain't a Love Song" "All I Ever Wanted" "Hallelujah"	Bon Jovi; Brian Melo (Winner's Single) k.d. lang & Leonard Cohen	WINNER

== Post-Idol career ==
=== 2007–2008: Livin' It ===
- 2007: Was the winner of Canadian Idol in 2007 which also led to the release of his first single, "All I Ever Wanted".
- 2007: His debut album, Livin' It, was released on November 27, 2007. Brian has 5 co-write credits on the album, more than any other Canadian Idol on their first album.
- 2008: He released his second single, "Shine" off his album Livin' It.
- 2008: On April 11 he released his 3rd single off his album, "Livin' It" called "Summertime".
- 2008: He made a cameo performing appearance on Faber Drive's video, "Sleepless Nights".
- 2008: He performed "Back to Me" on the Canadian Idol 6 finale, where it was confirmed as his 4th single.

=== 2008–2009 ===
- Late 2008: Announced new material is in the works.
- 2009: CTV announces he left Sony BMG to venture out on his own.

=== 2009–2010: The Truth ===
- 2010: Brian Melo's second album, The Truth, will be released in 2010.
- Brian works with acclaimed music producer Harry Hess of Harem Scarem Fame at Vespa Recording Studios. Billy Talent and Three Days Grace have also recorded with Harry Hess at Vespa.
- Brian wrote songs and found inspiration in trendy music hotbeds of Nashville, Tennessee and Chicago, Illinois. Many of the album's songs were written in Hamilton.
- A number of the songs on Brian's albums were co-written with Tanjola and Universal Canada artist Shiloh, including the debut single 'Soundproof'
- March 2010: Melo holds a private listening party for his new album, suggesting it is completed.
- September 2010: Brian has started his own record label named "Rat Pack Records." He also signed to Fontana North and Universal Music Canada.

== Notable accomplishments ==
- Winner Season 5 of Canadian Idol, 2007.
- The City of Hamilton declares October 12 Brian Melo Day.
- Worked and performed with mentors including Jon Bon Jovi, Queen, Paul Anka, and Maroon Five.
- Has met and worked with Kelly Clarkson, Suzie McNeil, Shiloh, Faber Drive, and Feist.
- Toured across Canada and has performed in historic national venues including the legendary Massey Hall. *Awarded the Nelly Furtado Award by COPA as the Outstanding Portuguese Canadian in 2007.
- Headlined the Azores (Portuguese Islands) most prestigious music festival Angra Rock in August 2008.
- Performed a duet on Faber Drive's (tour partners) hit single Sleepless Nights (Never Let Her Go).
- Shared the stage during Canadian Music Week with Alanis Morissette.
- 2012 Performed "Eye of the Tiger" for Sylvester Stallone at Carmens Banquet Center in Hamilton, Ontario.

== Discography ==
Brian Melo discography
- Studio albums: 2
- Singles: 6
- Music videos: 4
- Miscellaneous: 1
- Collaborations: 1
- Tours: 2

The following is a complete discography of every album and single released by Canadian pop rock singer-songwriter Brian Melo.

=== Albums ===
Year	Album details	Peak	Certifications (sales threshold)
Year	Album details	CA	Certifications (sales threshold)
2007	Livin' It: Release: November 27, 2007; Label: Sony BMG; Format: CD, digital download	14	CA: Gold; CA sales: 52,000+
2010	The Truth: Release: October 12, 2010; Label: Rat Pack/Fontana North/Universal; Format: CD, digital download	—	
"—" denotes releases that did not chart

=== Singles ===
Year	Single	Peak			Album
Year	Single	CAN	CAN Rock	Much	Album
2007	"All I Ever Wanted"	11	—	—	Livin' It
2008	"Shine"	69	—	—	Livin' It
2008	"Summertime"	—	—	—	Livin' It
2008	"Back to Me"	—	—	—	Livin' It
2010	"Soundproof"	—	23	4	The Truth
2011	"Anywhere But Here"	—	—	—	The Truth
2023	"Middleman"	—	—	—	TBA
"—" denotes releases that did not chart
2024	"In the Air"	—	—	—	TBA

== See also ==
- Canadian rock
- Music of Canada
