= Sons of Freedom (band) =

Canadian alternative rock band

Background information
- Origin: Vancouver, British Columbia, Canada
- Genres: Alternative rock, funk rock
- Years active: 1986–1993, 1995 (reunion: 2014)
- Labels: Slash Records, MCA Records, Chrysalis Records
- Past members: James Newton; Don Harrison; Don Short; Don Binns

Sons of Freedom were a Canadian alternative rock band of the late 1980s and early 1990s. The band, consisting of vocalist James Newton, guitarist Don Harrison, bassist Don Binns, and drummer Don Short, formed in 1986 in Vancouver, British Columbia.

Although sharing the same name as the Sons of Freedom, a controversial Doukhobor activist group, the band chose their name before learning of the existence of the Doukhobor group and briefly deliberated changing it. Because three of the four band members had the first name Don, the band was also sometimes jokingly nicknamed "Dons of Freedom".

== Career ==
Their self-titled debut album was released in 1988 on Slash Records, and was supported by a cross-Canada concert tour. The album was marked by a hybrid rock-funk style which was described by critics as a cross between Led Zeppelin and Gang of Four. They won the CASBY Award for Most Promising Group in 1989, and were shortlisted for the Juno Award for Most Promising Group at the Juno Awards of 1990.

The band's second album, Gump, was released in 1991 on MCA Records in Canada and Chrysalis Records in the United States. The album debuted at No. 1 on Chart, Canada's campus radio charts, and spawned "You're No Good", the band's only single to chart in the RPM Top Singles chart.

After being dropped from their record labels, the band broke up in 1993. Harrison, Binns and Short initially joined with singer Jen Wilson under the new band name Black Eye Buddha, although Sons of Freedom briefly reunited in 1995 to tour in support of a rarities compilation, Tex.

== Later work ==
Binns, Short and Harrison subsequently joined with Lee Aaron in the band 2preciious, and with Dave "Rave" Ogilvie in the project Jakalope.

In 2007, Newton launched a new project called Rat Silo. The band consisted of Don Binns (bass), Finn Manniche (guitar), Dave "Oz" Osborne (keyboards) and Sean Stubbs (drums).

On October 4, 2014, the four original members performed a reunion show to a sold out crowd at Vancouver's Imperial Lounge.

== Discography ==
=== Sons of Freedom (1988) ===
Track listing:

- 1. "Super Cool Wagon"
- 2. "The Criminal"
- 3. "Mona Lisa"
- 4. "Dead Dog on the Highway"
- 5. "Holy Rollers"
- 6. "Shoot Shoot"
- 7. "Judy Come Home"
- 8. "Is It Love"
- 9. "Fuck the System"
- 10. "This Is Tao"
- 11. "Alice Henderson"

=== Tex (1995) ===
Track listing:

- 1. "Walkie Talkie"
- 2. "I Want You"
- 3. "Hit It"
- 4. "Heaven"
- 5. "Yer Too High"
- 6. "I Believe"
- 7. "Sugar High"
- 8. "Blind Children"
- 9. "I'm Burning"
- 10. "Help Me"
- 11. "Underneath Yer Window"
- 12. "Wrong Direction"
- 13. "Best Friend"
- 14. "You Don't Belong"
- 15. "Don't Come Back"
- 16. "Blowakisstry This"
