= Dead Celebrity Status =

Canadian rap rock group

- Origin: Sudbury/London, Ontario, Canada
- Genres: Rap rock; alternative hip hop
- Years active: 2003-2004
- Labels: Bodog; Her Royal Majesty's Records; 6.8.2 Records Inc.
- Spinoff of: Project Wyze
- Past members: Yas Taalat; Bobby McIntosh; DJ Dopey

Dead Celebrity Status was a Canadian rap rock group formed in Sudbury, Ontario, in 2003. It consisted of the rappers Yas Taalat and Bobby McIntosh, both former members of the nu metal band Project Wyze, and DJ Dopey. The trio released their debut album, Blood Music, in 2004. It features collaborations with artists such as Joss Stone, Dave Navarro, Stephen Perkins, Bif Naked, Twiggy Ramirez, and DJ Lethal. "We Fall, We Fall" was the first single from the album. The song "Messiah" was featured on the soundtrack of the 2005 film XXX: State of the Union.

== Discography ==
- Blood Music (2004)
