= All You Ever Wanted (disambiguation) =

"All You Ever Wanted" is a 2021 song by Rag'n'Bone Man.

All You Ever Wanted may also refer to:

- "All You Ever Wanted", a song by the Black Keys from their 2008 album Attack & Release
- "All You Ever Wanted", the b-side to the UK CD single release of "Strange World" by Ké
- "All You Ever Wanted", a song by the Oliver Tree from his 2026 album Love You Madly Hate You Badly
- "All You Ever Wanted", a song by the Postmarks from their 2009 album Memoirs at the End of the World
- "All You Ever Wanted", a song by Llama from their 2001 album Close to the Silence

== See also ==
- All I Ever Wanted (disambiguation)
