= Mortal Geometry =

Studio album by Numb
- Released: August 23, 2019
- Studio: Studio 7 (Ho Chi Minh City, VT)
- Genre: Electro-industrial
- Length: 57:45
- Label: Metropolis
- Producer: David Collings; Don Gordon

Numb chronology
Language of Silence (1998)	Mortal Geometry (2019)

Mortal Geometry is the seventh studio album by Numb, released on August 23, 2019 by Metropolis Records.

== Reception ==
A critic at I Die: You Die credited the band with sounding inventive after over twenty year away from studio, saying "fluid textures of the later-90s material with some of the clarity and structure of their mechanized-rock era proves to be a good formula that sounds like the band without also sounding dated or like a retread."

== Track listing ==
All tracks are written by Don Gordon

No.	Title	Length
1.	"Redact"	4:23
2.	"Hush"	5:07
3.	"Complicit Silence"	5:51
4.	"The Waiting Room"	5:30
5.	"How It Ends"	6:15
6.	"Summer Lawns"	3:25
7.	"When Gravity Fails"	6:30
8.	"Shadow Play"	9:24
9.	"Mortal Geometry"	5:39
10.	"Hush (Creation to Negation)"	5:41

== Personnel ==
Adapted from the Mortal Geometry liner notes.

Numb

- Don Gordon – lead vocals, instruments, production, instruments, production

Additional musicians

- Khuyết Danh – vocals (4)

Production and design

- Giang Nguyen – design
- Tim Oberthier – engineering
- Dee Partdrige – photography
- Andrew Stiff – cover art
- Eric Van Wonterghem – mastering

== Release history ==
Region	Date	Label	Format	Catalog
United States	2019	Metropolis	CD, DL, LP	MET 1169
