= Britt Black =

Canadian musician

Brittin "Britt Black" Ireland is a Canadian rock musician that was signed to Her Royal Majesty's Records (HRMR) which signed and promoted her punk rock band LiveonRelease. Her song "Night Time" was included in the 2006 Vivendi released multiplayer-online PC/console game Scarface: The World Is Yours soundtrack.

== Career ==
=== Early years and LiveonRelease ===
Black's musical career began at the age of ten when she co-wrote with pop rock artist Bif Naked for the track "Violence", released on Lava/Atlantic records. At the age of fourteen Britt founded the all female teen group LiveonRelease. The band was signed to AOL Time Warner's record label where it released two albums, Seeing Red and Goes on a Field Trip. The success of these records landed the band on international showcases, along with starting a blitz on Canada's media including several high rotation music videos and spots on national TV and radio shows. The band's premier single "I'm Afraid of Britney Spears" was featured on the soundtrack for the movie Dude, Where's My Car?. When LiveonRelease eventually broke up, Black was quickly taken on by Bif Naked to perform as lead guitarist.

=== Solo career and other projects ===
Black released her first solo album, Blackout, in Canada in 2005 and in America on July 25, 2006, through Bodog Music/Sony/Red. That summer, she was on the Vans Warped Tour. At the end of 2007, Britt Black announced on her MySpace page that she was taking a break from touring to write and record her second album.

In February 2008, she also announced on her MySpace that she was developing a new band. The name of the new band was Stay Beautiful, and featured Britt Black and Marcus Ireland on lead vocals. In March 2009, Black announced on MySpace that she would be playing guitar in Lillix. In April 2010, Lillix announced on their website that she had left the band "as of winter 2009." Black was owner of Brittin.Scissor.Hands and a hair stylist at Clear Hair Studio in Vancouver, British Columbia. She is currently doing hair in tv & film. When asked if she still plays music, she replied "Never again".

== Personal life ==
Black is owner of Brittin.Scissor.Hands and is a hair stylist at Clear Hair Studio in Vancouver, British Columbia. As of 2015, Black is a hairstylist in the film industry. As of 2016, Black is married to former front man of Chinatown and The Lifetakers, Marcus Ireland. Black is also known as Brittin Ireland.

== Equipment ==
- Fender Stratocaster with Seymour Duncan humbuckers
- Marshall JCM 2000 full-stack
- Dunlop Tortex 1.0mm picks and Ernie Ball strings, gauged .011-.052
- pod - Amp Farm amplifier-modeling software plug-in for Pro Tools (for recording)
- 57' Les Paul Junior historic re-issue with P-90 handwound pickups

== Band ==
- Britt Black - Lead Vocals, Guitar

Ex-Members

- David Dandy - Guitar, Backup Vocals
- Daryl Hood - Drums
- Howard Humenick - Bass

== Singles ==
Year	Song	Album
2001	"I'm Afraid of Britney Spears"	W/Liveonrelease - Seeing Red
2002	"Get With It"	W/Liveonrelease - Seeing Red
2002	"Emotional Griptape"	W/Liveonrelease - Seeing Red
2003	"Let's Go"	W/Liveonrelease - Goes on a Field Trip
2003	"Rich and Filthy"	W/Bif Naked - Essentially Naked
2004	"Back In The Day"	W/Bif Naked - Essentially Naked
2005	"Jet Black Heart"	Blackout
2005	"Speed of Light"	Blackout
2009	"Dance Alone"	w/Lillix
