= Jaydee Bixby =

Canadian country musician (born 1990)

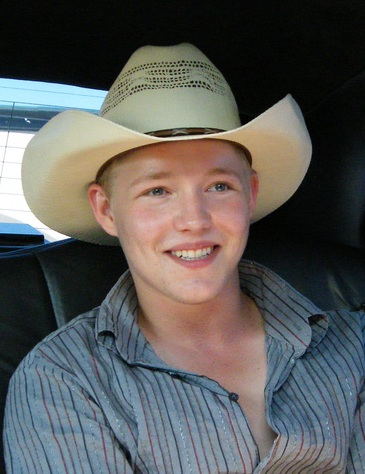

Background information
- Born: Jaydee Bixby; August 14, 1990 (age 35)
- Origin: Drumheller, Alberta
- Genres: Country music
- Occupations: Singer; songwriter
- Years active: 2007–present
- Labels: Her Royal Majesty's Records (2008–2009); On Ramp Records (2010–2012); Fontana North (2013–2014); Mid South Music Records (2015–present)
- Website: jaydeebixby.com

Jaydee Bixby (born August 14, 1990) is a Canadian country musician who was the runner-up on the fifth season of Canadian Idol. In 2008 he signed with Her Royal Majesty's Records and went on to release his debut album Cowboys and Cadillacs. Moving on to On Ramp Records in 2010, he released his second album Easy to Love.

== Before Canadian Idol ==
Bixby was born in Drumheller, Alberta, where he grew up. He moved to Red Deer, Alberta where he attended Hunting Hills High School. He was in a band called the "Bixbys" with his mother, father, and a family friend; they played at bars, weddings and rodeos. Jaydee has five sisters, four older and one younger. His father taught him guitar.

== Canadian Idol ==
Bixby auditioned for Canadian Idol in Calgary, Alberta. He sang "Lawdy Miss Clawdy" in his audition, and prompted judge Zack Werner to ask him what decade it was in Red Deer. All four judges agreed that Bixby should go on to the Toronto round. During his first solo in the Toronto rounds, he prompted Werner to tell everyone that he was the competition. During the semi-final rounds of the show, the judges predicted him as a potential winner. He made the top 10, and gained the support of votefortheworst.com. He did well week one of the top 10, but after that failed to really impress the judges, until the top 5-week. Although Bixby never fell into the bottom 3, he was runner-up to Brian Melo on September 11, 2007.

=== Performances and results ===
Week	Theme	Song Sung	Artist
Top 22	Idol's Choice	"Johnny B. Goode"	Chuck Berry
Top 18	Idol's Choice	"I Got A Woman"	Ray Charles
Top 14	Idol's Choice	"Sold (The Grundy County Auction Incident)"	John Michael Montgomery
Top 10	Billboard No. 1 Hits	"It's Only Make Believe"	Conway Twitty
Top 9	Songs From the 1960s	"Runaway"	Elvis Presley
Top 8	Acoustic Music	"Time of Your Life"	Green Day
Top 7	Hits of Queen	"I Want To Break Free"	Queen
Top 6	Songs of Pop-Rock	"Amazed"	Lonestar
Top 5	Inspiring Artists	"I Can't Stop Loving You"	Elvis Presley
Top 4	Pop Standards	"Fever" "When You're Smiling"	Peggy Lee; Louis Prima
Top 3	Judges' Choice; Idol's Choice	"Break It to Them Gently" "Ring of Fire"	Burton Cummings & Gil Grand; Johnny Cash
Top 2	Idol's Choice; Idol Single; New Choice	"Who Says You Can't Go Home" "All I Ever Wanted" "It's Not Unusual"	Bon Jovi; Brian Melo; Tom Jones

=== Post Idol ===
Bixby was a part of the Telus "Winners Tour" for the top 3 of Canadian Idol season 5, along with winner Brian Melo, and 3rd-place finisher Carly Rae Jepsen. Four shows were sold out in Bixby's hometown of Red Deer, Alberta, although only one was originally scheduled there. Since then Bixby has done shows with industry greats like Blake Shelton, Larry the Cable Guy, Jason Aldean, Taylor Swift, Kenny Chesney, Loretta Lynn, Kris Kristofferson, Charlie Daniels just to name a few.

== Career ==
=== Cowboys and Cadillacs (2008–2009) ===
Bixby moved from Alberta to Vancouver to work on his music career, his first time living on his own. He was signed to Her Royal Majesty's Records/International Arts, and his debut album, Cowboys and Cadillacs was released on July 8, 2008. The album was recorded in Vancouver and featured some of his own songwriting.

Bixby also released a song called "21st Century Christmas," which debuted on the collaborative Open Road album Christmas on the Open Road. His charitable work includes fund-raising for World Vision. In March 2009, he participated in Saskatoon's Kinsmen Telemiracle Marathon.

=== Easy to Love (2010–2012) ===
Bixby left Your Royal Majesty Records and was picked up by On Ramp Records. He released the single called "Boy Inside the Man." His second album, Easy to Love, was released on May 25, 2010.

On June 7, 2010, Bixby performed at the CMT Global Artist Party with 15 other international country stars.

Bixby, and other country stars from the Canadian Country Music Association hosted a Hall of Honour induction on September 10, 2010. Two more singles from Bixby followed in 2010, "Tailgate" and "Can't Ask (For More Than That)."

Jaydee was nominated for three awards for the 2010 British Columbia Country Music Awards.

=== Work in Progress (2013–2014) ===
Bixby left On Ramp Records to create his own label, Black Sheep Productions. His third album, Work in Progress, was released on August 13, 2013. Work in Progress features songs written by Bixby and a cover of Conway Twitty's "It's Only Make Believe". The song is endorsed by Conway Twitty's daughter Kathy.

=== Major record deal with Mid South Music Records (2015–present) ===
On January 30, 2015, he signed a major record deal with Mid South Music Records' former president TM Garret at Ardent Studios in Memphis, Tennessee. His 2015 World Tour will cover the United States, the United Kingdom and Australia, and will be supported by Co-Headliner Skyelor Anderson, who was in the Top 8 round on the US based X-Factor in 2011.

== Discography ==
=== Studio albums ===
Title	Details	Peak positions	Sales
Title	Details	CAN	Sales
Cowboys and Cadillacs	Release date: July 8, 2008; Label: Her Royal Majesty's Records; Format: CD, digital download	8	CAN: 24,000
Easy to Love	Release date: May 25, 2010; Label: On Ramp Records; Format: CD, digital download	—	CAN: 4,300
Work in Progress	Release date: August 13, 2013; Label: Fontana North; Format: CD, digital download	—	
"—" denotes releases that did not chart

=== Singles ===
Year	Single	Album
2008	"Old Fashioned Girl"	Cowboys and Cadillacs
2008	"Boys in the Band"	Cowboys and Cadillacs
2009	"Broken Windows"	Cowboys and Cadillacs
2009	"My So Called Life"	Cowboys and Cadillacs
2010	"Boy Inside the Man"	Easy to Love
2010	"Tailgate"	Easy to Love
2010	"Can't Ask (For More Than That)"	Easy to Love
2011	"Dream Bigger"	Easy to Love
2011	"Closer Than You Think"	Easy to Love
2011	"Always Love My Country"	Easy to Love
2013	"Walk You Home"	Work in Progress
2013	"On and On"	Work in Progress
2013	"She's Gone"	Work in Progress

=== Music videos ===
Year	Video	Director
2008	"Old Fashioned Girl"	
2008	"21st Century Christmas"	
2009	"Broken Windows"	
2009	"My So Called Life"	Stephano Barberis
2010	"Can't Ask (For More Than That)"	
2011	"Dream Bigger"	

=== Album appearances ===
Year	Song	Album
2008	"21st Century Christmas"	Christmas on the Open Road

== Awards and nominations ==
Year	Presenter	Award	Result
2010	Canadian Country Music Association	Rising Star	Nominated
2010	British Columbia Country Music Association	Male Vocalist of the Year	Nominated
2010	British Columbia Country Music Association	Album of the Year	Nominated
2010	British Columbia Country Music Association	Entertainer of the Year	Nominated
2011	Canadian Country Music Association	Rising Star	Nominated

== See also ==
- 2008 in Canadian music
