= Jordy Birch =

Canadian singer-songwriter

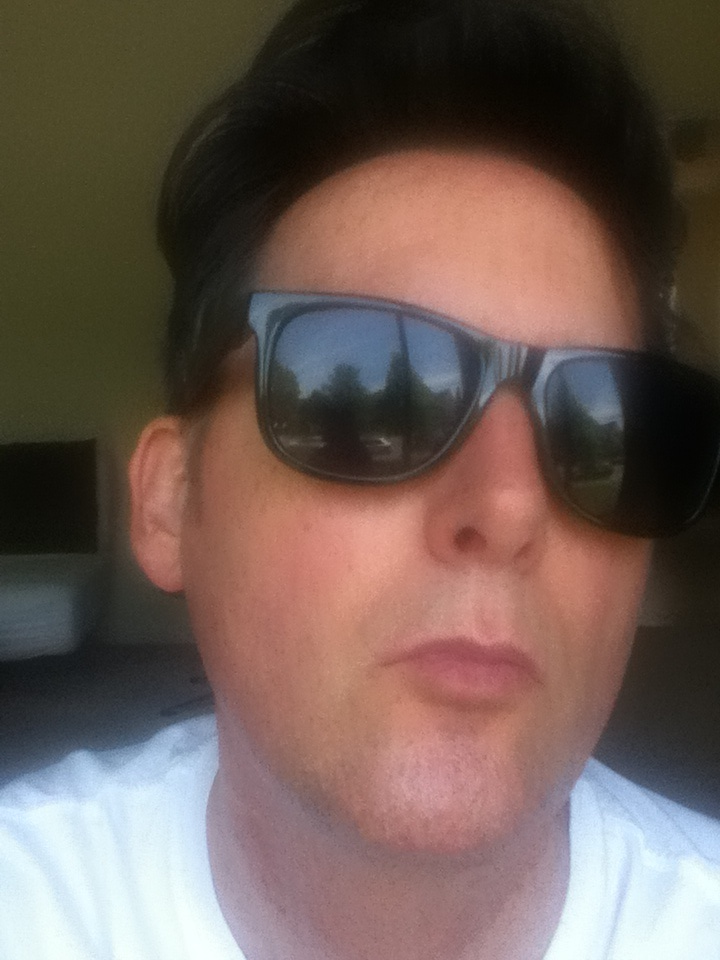
- Jordy Birch

Background information
- Origin: Vancouver, British Columbia, Canada
- Genres: Indie-rock; Alternative Rock
- Years active: 1991 - present

Jordy Birch is a Canadian singer-songwriter, composer and music producer born in Vancouver, British Columbia. Birch first began releasing his music with the rock band Pure, formed in Vancouver in 1991. Pure was discovered at Vancouver's Music West Conference in 1991, when they went there to showcase their demo, impressing amongst others, an executive from Restless Records. They were subsequently signed by Warner/Reprise and the band's song "Greedy" was used in the Ralph Bakshi animated movie Cool World. Pure had several #1 singles in Canada, and their song "Blast" reached #22 on the American Alternative Songs chart.

After Pure, Birch went on to having a solo career, with the 2001 single, "Moola Moola" which reached #12 on the Canada CHR chart. In 2008, he formed Guilty About Girls with Mark R. Henning on bass and DJ Lucas T. Poth on drums and programming. Guilty About Girls is part of the Vancouver artist's collective Boutique Empire. Their single "Candy Candy" was a radio hit across alternative radio and also reached #1 on iTunes. In 2015, he formed a new group called The Wivez.
