= I Bificus =

Studio album by Bif Naked
- Released: February 24, 1998 (Canada); July 27, 1999 (United States)
- Genre: Indie rock
- Length: 45:58
- Label: Lava; Atlantic
- Producer: Glenn Rosenstein; Peter Karroll; John Webster; Oliver Leiber

Bif Naked chronology
Okenspay Ordway (1997)	I Bificus (1998)	Purge (2001)

Professional ratings
Review scores
Source	Rating
Allmusic	4/5 stars

I Bificus is the second album by Canadian singer Bif Naked, released in 1998. It features her best known songs "Moment of Weakness," "Spaceman," "Lucky," and "Chotee."

== Track listing ==
=== Canadian release – March 1998 (Her Royal Majesty's/Aquarius/EMI) ===
1. "Any Day Now" – 4:17
2. "Spaceman" – 4:21
3. "Moment of Weakness" – 2:28
4. "Lucky" – 4:25
5. "Sophia" – 4:28
6. "Chotee" – 3:51
7. "Violence" – 4:15
8. "The Peacock Song" – 3:02
9. "If I" – 4:10
10. "Anything" – 4:43
11. "Only the Girl" – 3:34
12. "Spaceman (Boomtang Boys Mix)" – 4:18*
13. "Lucky (Boomtang Boys Mix)" – 4:05*

*Bonus tracks included on some editions

=== US/UK release – August 1999 (Lava/Atlantic) ===
1. "I Died" (Bif Naked/Peter Karroll/Doug McCarvell) – 4:08

- Also included on Another 5 Songs and a Poem.

2. "Any Day Now" (Bif Naked/Peter Karroll) – 4:16
3. "Spaceman [Edit]" (Bif Naked/Peter Karroll) – 3:42

- The original ending of the song has been replaced by a fade-out.

4. "Moment of Weakness" (Bif Naked/Peter Karroll) – 2:30
5. "Lucky [Video Edit]" (Bif Naked/Brad McGiveron) – 3:58

- There is an additional portion of the second verse and the instrumentation features more strings and less guitar.

6. "Sophia" (Bif Naked/Peter Karroll/Russ Klyne) – 4:27
7. "Chotee" (Bif Naked/Alexander /Arundel a.k.a. Gene Poole [a.k.a. X Factor]) – 3:49
8. "Violence" (Bif Naked/Peter Karroll/Brittin Karroll) – 4:12
9. "The Peacock Song" (Bif Naked/Peter Karroll) – 3:03
10. "Anything [Edit]" (Bif Naked/Peter Karroll/Rich Priske) – 4:04

- The final verse has been edited out.

11. "Only the Girl" (Bif Naked/Brad McGiveron) – 3:28
12. "Twitch" (Bif Naked/Peter Karroll) – 4:21

- Also included on Another 5 Songs and a Poem.

Enhanced CD content: a link to a website featuring a music video for "Chotee."

== Personnel ==
- Bif Naked – acoustic guitar, guitar, vocals
- Randy Black – drums
- Coco Culbertson – drums, bass guitar, background vocals
- Peter Karroll – acoustic guitar, guitar, drums, bass, background vocals
- Russ Klyne – acoustic guitar
- Matt Laug – drums
- Oliver Leiber – acoustic guitar, electric guitar
- Doug McCarvell – guitar
- Lance Morrison – bass
- Adam Percy – keyboards, Programming
- Rich "Rock" Priske – bass
- Peter Rafelson – keyboards
- Mike Sage – drums, keyboards, Programming
- John Webster – percussion, keyboards
- Jerry Wong – guitar
- Daniel Yaremko – bass

== Production ==
- Producers: Peter Karroll, Oliver Leiber, Glenn Rosenstein, John Webster
- Engineers: Delwyn Brooks, Johnny Potoker, Barry Rudolph, David Swope
- Assistant engineers: Delwyn Brooks, Tara Nelson, Shaun Thingvold
- Mixing: Delwyn Brooks, Brian Malouf, Tara Nelson, Johnny Potoker
- Mixing assistant: Delwyn Brooks, Tara Nelson
- Mastering: Andy VanDette
- Digital Editing: Tal Herzberg
- Programming: Adam Percy, Mike Sage, John Webster
- Drum Programming: Oliver Leiber
- Keyboard Programming: Oliver Leiber
- Arranger: Peter Karroll
- String Coordinator: Glenn Rosenstein
- Layout Design: Ralph Alfonso
- Artwork: Ralph Alfonso
- Photo Concept: Karen Moskowitz
- Photography: David Leyes, Karen Moskowitz
- Liner Notes: Bif Naked
- Illustrations: Bif Naked
- Hand Lettering: Bif Naked
- Drawing: Bif Naked

== Charts ==
Chart (1999)	Peak position
US Heatseekers Albums (Billboard)	42

=== Year-end charts ===
Chart (2002)	Position
Canadian Alternative Albums (Nielsen SoundScan)	200

== Certifications ==
Region	Certification	Certified units/sales
Canada (Music Canada)	Platinum	100,000^{^}
^{^} Shipments figures based on certification alone.
