= Numb (band) =

Canadian electro-industrial band

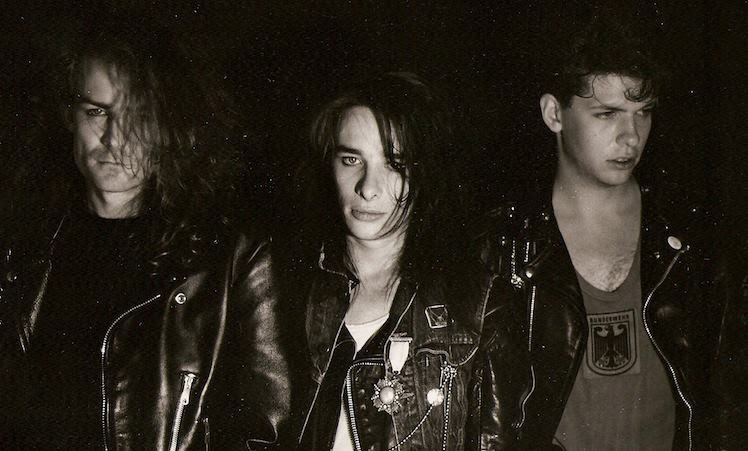
- NUMB original lineup 1986: (L-R) Don Gordon, Sean St. Hubbs (Sean Stubbs), David Hall.

Background information
- Origin: Vancouver, British Columbia, Canada
- Genres: Electro-industrial, industrial rock
- Years active: 1986–1998, 2019
- Labels: Metropolis; Zoth Ommog; Re-Constriction; KK; Lively Art; Edge Records; Burning Records
- Members: Don Gordon
- Past members: David Collings; Richard Hanely; Conan Hunter; Blair Dobson; David Hall; Sean Stubbs

Numb is a Canadian electro-industrial band that is based in Vancouver, British Columbia, Canada.

== History ==
Numb was founded by Don Gordon, David Hall and Sean Stubbs in 1986. The band issued their self-titled debut studio album Numb in 1987 on Edge and World Records. Their second album Christmeister was released by Lively Art in 1989.

The band's third album Death on the Installment Plan, released in 1993, featured weird electronic tape-loops overlaid with heavily distorted vocals. The 1994 album Wasted Sky used some of the same techniques, but with a darker feel and more technically varied approach.

Singer David Collins joined the band in 1995; the band released its fifth album, Blood Meridian, which contained strong, violent electronic sound but no guitar music, in 1997. Two years later, Numb recorded the electronic dance album Language of Silence, released through Metropolis. The tracks on this album were somewhat quieter and darkly intense.

Following the release of one final single, "Suspended", Numb disbanded in 1998, and Gordon moved to Vietnam to live with his wife.

After what was considered by many to be a retirement of the project and Don Gordon from the music scene in general, an album of new material was made available via Bandcamp on August 23, 2019, titled Mortal Geometry.

== Members ==
=== Former ===
- Don Gordon – keyboards, programming, guitars, production, vocals (1986–1998, 2019)
- Sean Stubbs – vocals, drums, percussion (1986–1988, 1994, 1998) (Note: Stubbs was a touring member only during his second and third stints in the band.)
- David Hall – keyboards, programming (1986–1991)
- Blair Dobson – vocals (1988–1991)
- Conan Hunter – vocals, programming (1991–1995)
- Richard Hanley – drums, percussion (1993–1994)
- David Collings – vocals (1995–1998)

=== Timeline ===
Color denotes main live duty.

== Discography ==
Studio albums

- Numb (1987, Edge/World)
- Christmeister (1989, Lively Art)
- Death on the Installment Plan (1993, Re-Constriction/KK)
- Wasted Sky (1994, KK)
- Blood Meridian (1997, Zoth Ommog/Metropolis)
- Language of Silence (1998, Metropolis)
- Mortal Geometry (2019, Metropolis)

Live albums

- Koro (1996, Gift)

Compilation albums

- Blue Light (1987, Burning)
- Fixate (1993, KK)
- Desire/Blind Remixes (1998, KK)
- The Valence of Noise (2014, Minimal Maximal)

Singles

- "Ruby Tuesday", split with Dazibao (1988, Out of Nowhere)
- "Cash" (1989, Lively Art)
- "Bliss" (1990, Oceana/Onslot Music)
- "Blind" (1997, Metropolis)
- "Suspended" (1998, Metropolis)
- "Dead Inside", split with UCNX (2025, Independent)

Compilation appearances

- "Eugene (Pickaxe Mix by Pig and Andrew Burton)" on Funky Alternatives Vol. 6 Concrete (1991)
- "Curse (Metastsizing Dub)" on Electro-Genetic KK (1993)
- "Shithammer (Dread & Bled)" on Moonraker Off Beat (1993)
- "Blue Light, Black Candle (live)" on Celtic Circle Sampler #2 Celtic Circle Productions (1994)
- "Ratblast (Compressed & Distressed)" on The Digital Space Between Hard (1994)
- "Decay of the Angel" on Body Rapture Vol. 4 Zoth Ommog (1994)
- cover of Salt-n-Pepa's "Push It" on Operation Beatbox Re-constriction (1996)
- "Mr. Rogers' Neighborhood" on TV Terror: Felching a Dead Horse Re-constriction (1997)
- "Blind (Hyper-dilated) on Electronic Lust, Vol. 1 Orkus (1998)
- "Desire (Protean)" on The O-Files Vol. 3 Off Beat (1998)
- "Desire (Prelude and Nocturne)" on The O-Files Vol. 3 Off Beat (1998)
- "Blind (Mentallo Mix)" on The O-Files Vol. 3 Off Beat (1998)
- "Blood (Crash & Bleed Edit)" on Electropolis, Vol. 1 Metropolis (1998)
- cover of the theme from "Suspiria" on Electronic Lust Orkus (1999)
- "Half-Life" on Septic Vol. 1 Dependent (1999)
- "Respect" on Electro Club Attack-Shot 2 XXC (1999)
- "Static" on Electropolis, Vol. 2 Metropolis (2000)
- "Deviation" on Orgazma Tracks Vol. 3 Alter Ego (2001)

== Side projects ==
- Halo-Gen (Pendragon Records)
