= Gump (album) =

Studio album by Sons of Freedom
- Released: 1991
- Genre: Rock
- Labels: Chrysalis (US); MCA (Canada)
- Producer: Chris Wardman

Sons of Freedom chronology
Sons of Freedom (1988)	Gump (1991)	Tex (1995)

Gump is the second album by the Canadian band Sons of Freedom, released in 1991. The band was coy about the origin of the album title, claiming that it was inspired by Aerosmith's Pump, Van Halen's "Jump", and Canadian goaltender Gump Worsley. "You're No Good" was the first single. Sons of Freedom supported the album with a Canadian tour.

== Production ==
The album was produced by Chris Wardman. Sons of Freedom funded the recording sessions by selling their tour van. Most of the tracks began as studio jams, with the band then going over which parts worked as songs while maintaining a groove. The lyrics were written by frontman Jim Newton (using the name Jim Kingston) in the fall of 1989; they were influenced by what Newton learned about storytelling in an acting class that he took. Newton elected not to play guitar on Gump, in part because the band did not want to repeat the musical style of their debut.

== Critical reception ==
Professional ratings
Review scores
Source	Rating
AllMusic	3/5 stars
Calgary Herald	B
Morning Sentinel	7/10
The Winnipeg Sun	4/5 stars

The Vancouver Sun called the album a "compendium of thoughtful, rhythmic and riff-riddled pop", opining that it "splatters a canvas of sludge-guitar grey with streaks of brilliant melody to create a kind of post-punk sonic impressionism." The Ottawa Citizen noted the "hypnotic, overdriven rhythm, in the tradition of such British groups as Gang of Four and Killing Joke." The Calgary Herald concluded that "Gump is ugly rock 'n' roll... And that's what it makes it so appealing."

The Hamilton Spectator opined that "Gump's true charm lies in the instrumental diversity offered by guitarist Don Harrison, bassist Don Binns and drummer Don Short." The Winnipeg Sun praised the "invigorating music". The Blade labeled the album "catchy" "muscle rock". The Morning Sentinel likened the band to the Escape Club and Aerosmith, "but with a strong alternative influence."

== Track listing ==
No.	Title	Length
1.	"You're No Good"
2.	"Dreamgirl #1"
3.	"Call Me"
4.	"Circle Circle"
5.	"I Can See"
6.	"USA Long Distance"
7.	"I Don't Care Anymore"
8.	"Jesus and Jim"
9.	"The Girl Can't Help It"
10.	"Dreamgirl #2"
