= Blood Meridian (album) =

Studio album by Numb
- Released: September 30, 1997
- Recorded: May 1997
- Studios: Chindogu (Vancouver, BC)
- Genre: Electro-industrial
- Length: 60:35
- Label: Metropolis
- Producers: David Collings; Don Gordon

Numb chronology
Koro (1996)	Blood Meridian (1997)	Desire/Blind Remixes (1998)

Singles from Blood Meridian
- 1. "Blind" Released: 1997

Blood Meridian is the fifth studio album by Numb, released on September 30, 1997 by Metropolis Records. When asked about the album, composer Don Gordon said "his album was an experiment for us, in that we wrote it very quickly. We had another album that was finished that was getting entangled in all sorts of legal issues, so we decided to sit down and write "Blood Meridian" very quickly so we could meet our release schedule."

== Reception ==
Professional ratings
Review scores
Source	Rating
AllMusic	3/5 stars

AllMusic called Blood Meridian a "relentless album" that "does not stagnate" and further said its "impossible for passive listening, a testament to its intensity." Vicki Aubin of CMJ praised the band for maintaining "a firm solid palette of darkness and aggression" Lollipop Magazine credited the band for standing out from then current competition and praised their use of symphonic elements. A critic at Sonic Boom praised the music's grinding and pulsing rhythms, saying "it seems that Don has decided to meld together all of his old trademark musical structures with noise and techno and infuse into a new caustic Electro hybrid that abuses your ears while it drives your body to flail to the percussion."

== Track listing ==
All tracks are written by David Collings and Don Gordon.

No.	Title	Length
1.	"Blind"	7:57
2.	"Dirt"	7:13
3.	"Blood Meridian"	4:44
4.	"Stalker"	7:12
5.	"Desire"	5:41
6.	"Critical Mass"	5:14
7.	"No Time"	6:58
8.	"Alien Hand"	7:01
9.	"Deserted"	6:03
10.	"Spasm"	2:32

== Personnel ==
Adapted from the Blood Meridian liner notes.

Numb

- David Collings – lead vocals, instruments, production, engineering, mixing
- Don Gordon – instruments, production, engineering, mixing

Production and design

- MMM Graphics – design
- Tim Oberthier – engineering
- Dee Partdrige – photography
- Craig Waddell – mastering

== Release history ==
Region	Date	Label	Format	Catalog
Belgium	1997	KK	CD	KK 165
United States	1997	Metropolis	CD	MET 063
