= Everything I Wanted (disambiguation) =

"Everything I Wanted" is a 2019 song by Billie Eilish.

Everything I Wanted may also refer to:

- "Everything I Wanted" (The Bangles song), 1990
- "Everything I Wanted" (Dannii Minogue song), 1997
