= Blood Music (Dead Celebrity Status album) =

Studio album by Dead Celebrity Status
- Released: June 13, 2004
- Genre: Hip-Hop/rap rock
- Length: 50:38
- Label: Bodog
- Producer: Dead Celebrity Status, DJ Lethal, Danny Saber

Professional ratings
Review scores
| Source | Rating |
|---|---|
| Allmusic | link |

Blood Music is the debut album by the Canadian hip-hop/rap group Dead Celebrity Status, released on June 13, 2004, on Bodog Music.

== Track listing ==
| No. | Title | Writer(s) | Length |
|---|---|---|---|
| 1. | "Intro" | McIntosh, Rise Born, Taalat | 1:51 |
| 2. | "We Fall, We Fall" (featuring Dave Navarro and Stephen Perkins) | Jeff Dalziel, McIntosh, Danny Saber | 4:22 |
| 3. | "In This Day & Age" (featuring Bif Naked and Twiggy) | Karroll, McIntosh, Naked | 4:47 |
| 4. | "Somebody Turn the Lights Out" (featuring DJ Lethal) | Lethal, McIntosh, Saber | 4:01 |
| 5. | "Erica" (featuring Joss Stone) | Dalziel, McIntosh, Saber | 4:09 |
| 6. | "Messiah" | Dalziel, McIntosh, Saber | 4:05 |
| 7. | "If These Walls Could Talk" | Dalziel, McIntosh, Saber | 4:33 |
| 8. | "While I Was Asleep" | Abdelnour, McIntosh, Saber | 4:33 |
| 9. | "Five Deadly Fingers" | DJ Dopey | 4:20 |
| 10. | "Back to '88" | McIntosh, Saber, Taalat' | 1:27 |
| 11. | "Somebody I Once Knew" | Dalziel, McIntosh, Saber | 4:21 |
| 12. | "In My Backyard" | Arythmeic, McIntosh, Saber | 4:04 |
| 13. | "Blood Music" | McIntosh, Saber, Taalat | 4:05 |

== Personnel ==
Dead Celebrity Status

- Bobby McIntosh
- DJ Dopey
- Yas Taalat

Additional musicians

- Dave Navarro
- Stephen Perkins
- Bif Naked
- Jeordie White "Twiggy"
- Joss Stone

Production

- Jeff Dalziel – producer, engineer
- Danny Saber – producer, engineer, performer, mixing
- Jamie Sitar – mastering
