= Sean Stubbs =

Canadian musician

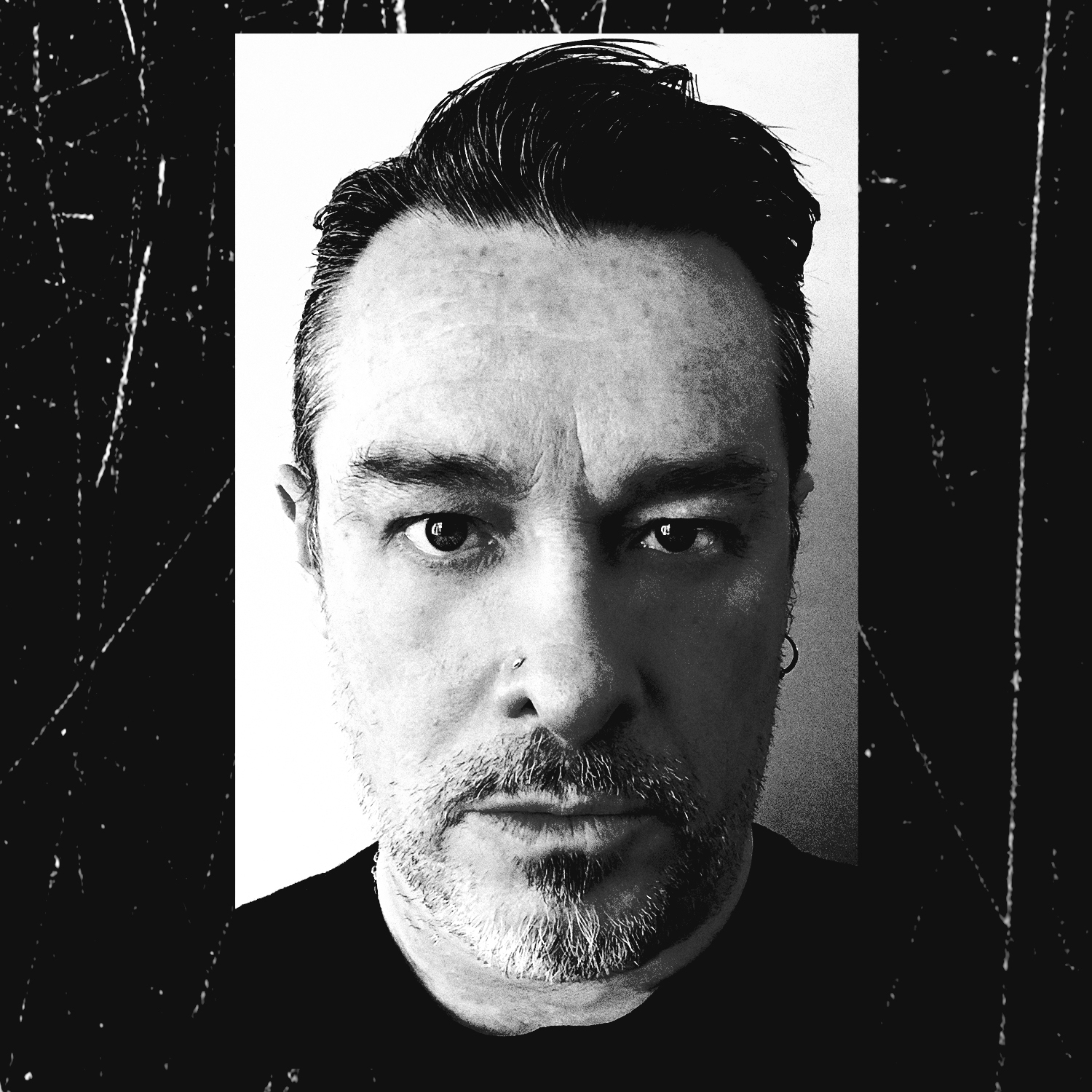
- Sean Stubbs in 2020

Background information
- Also known as: Sean St.Hubbs, Stubbsonic
- Born: Sean Russell Stubbs; Wallasey, Cheshire, England
- Origin: Vancouver, British Columbia, Canada
- Genres: Punk rock, Alternative rock, industrial
- Occupations: Musician; songwriter; composer; web developer
- Instruments: Drums, percussion, lead vocals, guitar
- Years active: 1984–present
- Labels: Metropolis; Orange Record Label; KK; Lively Art; Edge; Burning; SODEH Records
- Member of: Rat Silo
- Formerly of: Numb, SNFU, Jakalope, Bif Naked, Air Raid Siren
- Website: Official web page

Sean R. Stubbs is a Canadian musician. He has served as the lead vocalist and drummer in the electro industrial band Numb, the drummer in the industrial rock band Jakalope, and the punk rock band SNFU. He has also been a member of alternative rock singer-songwriter Bif Naked's band. He is a currently a member of Canadian Alternative rock band Rat Silo.

== Career ==
After playing in high school punk bands No Ambition and Inoxia at West Vancouver's Hillside Secondary School, Stubbs became involved with Numb around the time of its formation in 1986, when he served as the band's lead singer under the pseudonym Sean St. Hubbs. He was involved intermittently with the group, often serving as its live drummer, until its dissolution in 2000.

Stubbs played with Bif Naked beginning in 1996, acting as her live drummer as well. Around this time, he also had a brief tenure with the Canadian punk band SNFU from 1998 to 1999. Stubbs was an original member of Jakalope starting in 2003. Since then, he also co-founded Air Raid Siren (featuring Rob Johnson, his former bandmate in SNFU) and Rat Silo (with members of Sons of Freedom) in 2007.

In addition to playing music, Stubbs is a web development and graphic design instructor at the Wilson School of Design at Kwantlen Polytechnic University, LaSalle College Vancouver and former Program Coordinator at the Visual College of Art and Design.
