= All I Ever Wanted (Brian Melo song) =

2007 single by Brian Melo

Single by Brian Melo

from the album Livin' It
- Released: September 11, 2007
- Recorded: September 2007
- Genre: Pop rock
- Length: 3:20
- Label: Sony BMG
- Songwriter(s): Chris Perry, Nicole Hughes

Brian Melo singles chronology
"All I Ever Wanted" (2007)	"Shine" (2008)

"All I Ever Wanted" is the "winner's single" of the fifth season of Canadian Idol.

== Background ==
It was recorded by Idol winner Brian Melo. It was also recorded by runner up Jaydee Bixby; though his version was not officially released it was leaked onto the internet. Brian's version of the single has debuted at #11 on the Canadian Hot 100, as of September 29, 2007.

== Production ==
The song was written by Chris Perry and Nicole Hughes. It was recorded September 2007, two months before the album's release.

== Charts ==
Chart (2008)	Peak position
Canada (Canadian Hot 100)	11
Canada AC (Billboard)	20
Canada CHR/Top 40 (Billboard)	21
Canada Hot AC (Billboard)	5
Canada Hot Digital Songs (Billboard)	5
