= Bif Naked (album) =

Studio album by Bif Naked
- Released: 1994; 1996 (re-release)
- Genre: Indie rock
- Length: 42:04
- Label: Concrete; Aquarius
- Producer: John R. Dexter

Bif Naked chronology
Bif Naked (1994)	Okenspay Ordway (1997)

Professional ratings
Review scores
Source	Rating
Allmusic	3/5 stars

Bif Naked is the first album by Canadian singer Bif Naked, released in 1994. The album was originally released through Bif Naked's own label, Concrete. The album was later picked up by Aquarius Records; it was remixed and re-released in 1996.

== Track listing ==
1. "Everything" (Bif Naked/John R. Dexter) – 4:08
2. "Make Like a Tree" (Bif Naked/Harry Degen/Lionel Misomali/Doug Plavin) – 4:16
3. "Daddy's Getting Married" (Bif Naked/John R. Dexter) – 3:42
4. "Tell on You ("Letter to My Rapist")" (Bif Naked/John R. Dexter) – 2:28
5. "Never Alone" (Bif Naked/John R. Dexter) – 3:57
6. "Over You" (Bif Naked/Harry Degen/Lionel Misomali/Doug Plavin) – 4:27
7. "Succulent" (Bif Naked/John R. Dexter) – 3:50
8. "My Whole Life" (Bif Naked) – 4:12
9. "The Letter" (Bif Naked/Brad McGiveron) – 5:06
10. "My Bike" (Bif Naked/Brad McGiveron) – 4:37
11. "The Gross Gross Man" (Bif Naked) – 1:21

== Credits ==
- Bif Naked – vocals
- Russ Klyne – guitar
- Niko Quintal – drums
- Todd Simko – guitar
- John Webster – keyboards
- Jerry Wong – guitar
- Rich Priske – bass

== Production ==
- Producer – John R. Dexter
- Engineer – Drexel Molière
- Assistant engineers – Zach Blackstone, Rod Michaels
- Mixing – Drexel Molière
