= Her Royal Majesty's Records =

Canadian record label

Her Royal Majesty's Records (HRMR) is a Canadian independent record label founded in Vancouver, British Columbia in 1995 by Bif Naked and Peter Karroll and managed by Peter Karroll. Originally HRM Records was created as Bif Naked's vanity label after Plum Records became defunct after the release of Bif Naked's 1994 self-titled release. Peter Karroll licensed Bif's songs to many major labels and did co-venture music projects including mixing and recording tracks for Films and Television. Peter Karroll co-wrote, produced and mixed many successful tracks including Platinum and Gold selling albums and singles with Bif Naked. In 2005 Peter Karroll merged the music label with Calvin Ayre's Bodog Entertainmentʼs record label; Bodog Music. HRM Records was the backbone of the Bodog entertainment juggernaut and combined with the World Wrestling Entertainment, LLC's Artist Management company TKO Entertainment Corp that financed and directed the Bodog Entertainment entity in producin over 150 network television shows in the U.S. and licensed in many countries. As well live events on In Demand and music television programing on the Fuse Network all contributed to the overall success of Bodog Entertainment. In 2008, the entertainment companies were unmerged and Peter Karroll moved forward more albums with Bif Naked and the American rap/hip hop rapper icon DMX. During the Bodog Era, Peter signed and released the Legendary Hip Hop group the Wu-Tang Clan. With thousands of live events were produced with the Artists from HRMR/Bodog with them touring extensively on major festivals and tours such as Warped Tour, Family Values, Rock Am Ring at Rock Am Park, Hultsfred Festival. Bif Naked's largest attendance in the headline position was 2011 in Cloverdale, B.C. where she performed in front of 110,000 estimated audience.

It has released albums via Worldwide Distribution deals with EMI's Distribution network, Atlantic Records and Sony Music.

== Artist roster ==
- Bif Naked - alternative/indie rock/acoustic (certified multi platinum & gold)
- Britt Black - alternative/rock
- Dead Celebrity Status - rap/hip-hop
- The Heck - rock
- Hydro and Syndicate Villain - rap/hip-hop
- LiveonRelease - punk rock/pop punk
- Nazanin - pop/world music
- Wu-Tang Clan - hip-hop (certified multi-platinum)
- Out of Your Mouth - hard rock/heavy metal
- Soma City Ward - hard rock
- Todd Kerns - rock
- The Flairs [alternative/rock]
- The Vincent Black Shadow - alternative rock
- Fresh Bread - hip-hop
- Gabezra And...The Way Out - eclectic/acoustic rock/electronica
- Jaydee Bixby - country rock
- Mr. Crippin (Chris Crippin)
- DMX - rap/hip hop (certified multi-platinum)

== See also ==
- List of record labels
