= Bif Naked =

Canadian singer (born 1971)

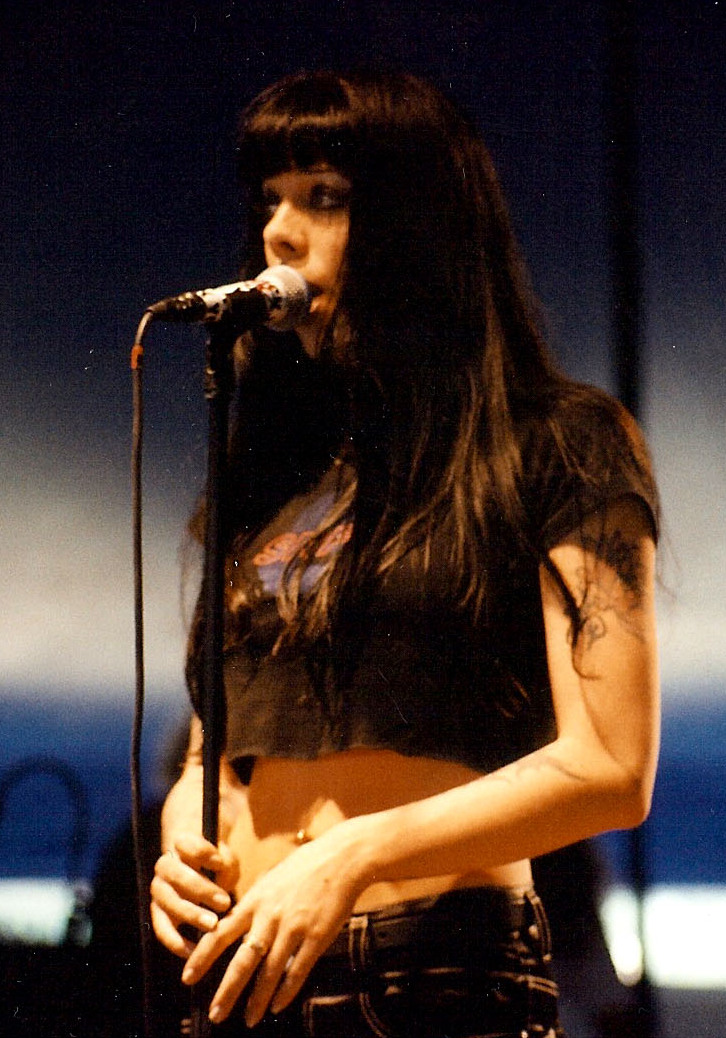
- Naked performing live in 2006

Background information
- Also known as: Beth Hopkins, Beth Walker, Beth Torbert
- Born: Beth Nicole Torbert; June 15, 1971 (age 55); New Delhi, Delhi, India
- Origin: Winnipeg, Manitoba, Canada
- Genres: Alternative rock; pop punk; EDM
- Occupations: Singer-songwriter; producer; manager
- Instruments: Vocals; synths
- Years active: 1994–present
- Labels: Concrete; Aquarius; Lava; Atlantic; Her Royal Majesty's; Warner; International Arts
- Website: bifnaked.com

Beth Nicole Torbert (born June 15, 1971) is a Canadian singer best known by her stage name Bif Naked. Between 1996 and 2016, she was among the top 150 selling Canadian artists in Canada. She charted at No. 1 on Billboard Canada for the single "Spaceman" and was heavy rotation on MTV TRL for the video of "Moment of Weakness". The album I Bificus was multiplatinum internationally.

== Early life and education ==
Bif Naked was born Beth Nicole Torbert in New Delhi, India, on June 15, 1971, to teenage parents attending boarding school. She was subsequently adopted by American missionaries. She spent part of her childhood in Lexington, Kentucky, where her father was a professor at the University of Kentucky. She went to Kelsey Elementary School in The Pas, Manitoba, for a couple of years. After living for a time in Dauphin, Manitoba, her family eventually settled in Winnipeg. She graduated from John Taylor Collegiate and studied theatre at the University of Winnipeg. After university, she began pursuing a career as a stand-up comic.

The name "Bif" started as a nickname based on the mispronunciation of her real name, Beth.

== Career ==
After spending several years singing with several underground bands, Torbert independently released a self-titled solo album, Bif Naked, in 1994, and I Bificus in 1998. In 1999, she toured across Canada.

Another solo album, Purge was released in 2001. She also released a spoken word album called Okenspay Ordway: Things I Forgot To Tell Mommy. In 2005, after narrowing it down from over fifty songs, she released Superbeautifulmonster, which featured thirteen tracks. The Promise, which was recorded while Torbert was undergoing chemotherapy for breast cancer, was released in 2009 and was dedicated to her fans. The album featured tracks mixed by Juno Award winner Mike Fraser. In 2011, after doing acoustic sets on tour, Torbert released an acoustic record on Her Royal Majesty's Records in late-2013. The album features acoustic versions of her past songs as well as four previously unreleased tracks. The album is entitled BIF NAKED FOREVER: Acoustic Hits and Other Delights. Torbert has also been involved on a side project, Jakkarta.

Prior to her solo career, Torbert played with punk bands Gorilla Gorilla and Chrome Dog. She has toured Europe, the United States, and Canada as a headlining act, and has performed on bills with: Snoop Dogg, Billy Idol, Dido, Devin Townsend, Sarah McLachlan, Sheryl Crow, Chrissie Hynde, Foo Fighters, The Cult, The Prodigy, Smashing Pumpkins, Ministry, Green Day, and many more.

Torbert's music has been featured in and on soundtracks for shows including Buffy the Vampire Slayer, Charmed, Moonlight, The Crow: Stairway to Heaven, Ready To Rumble, The West Wing and Celebrity Deathmatch. She recorded a rendition of the Christmas classic, "I Saw Mommy Kissing Santa Claus" for MTV's Total Request Live CD MTV: TRL Christmas in 1999 and was also featured on the Ready to Rumble soundtrack with a cover of Twisted Sister's "We're Not Gonna Take It". The cover was additionally used as David Arquette's entrance theme while he was on WCW Monday Nitro. The song "Dawn", taken from Purge, was featured in the film American Psycho 2, starring Mila Kunis and William Shatner.

She made a guest appearance in the song "Fucker", on Strapping Young Lad's album The New Black in 2006. Torbert has also made guest appearances with artists such as SNFU on the songs "One Last Loveshove" and "You Make Me Thick". She also appeared on the Dead Celebrity Status album Blood Music on the track titled "In This Day and Age". In 2011, she recorded a duet with Vancouver-based yogi and Nettwerk recording artist Will Blunderfield for the international version of his album Hallelujah.

Torbert has also appeared in music videos for other artists including: "Believe Me" and "Silver" by Moist and Liveonrelease's "Get with It." In 2009, she appeared in the video for Simple Plan's "Save You" near the end along with other people (such as Sharon Osbourne and René Angélil) who have survived or have been treated for cancer.

Aside from her music career, Torbert has also pursued acting. In 1990, she appeared in the film Archangel, playing a Russian soldier. In 1997, she played a liquor store manager in The Boys Club. She appeared in the television series Once a Thief in 1998, playing Nastassja Momomame. In 2000, she voiced the character Alison in the Daria movie, Is It Fall Yet?, playing a bisexual art camp attendee who attempts to seduce Jane Lane. She appeared in the Canadian indie films Lunch with Charles (2001) and Crossing (2005), the latter of which she recorded the song "My Greatest Masterpiece" for. She has done hosting work for the CBC Television series ZeD (becoming their first host in 2002), and for Bodog, hosting Bodog Fight in 2006 as well as a reality series chronicling the days leading up to her marriage with Vancouver Sun sports writer, Ian Walker, in 2007 called Bif Naked Bride. She voiced the character Zoe Payne in the SSX video game series and Sled Storm. In 2003, she made a cameo appearance in the zombie horror film The House of the Dead. That same year, she appeared as a judge of a fictitious reality show in the TV series Cold Squad. In 2006, she guest starred on an episode of The L Word, playing a character named Cynthia. In addition, Torbert has appeared as herself in Buffy the Vampire Slayer, The Crow: Stairway to Heaven and The Chris Isaak Show. Torbert also narrated the TV series That's Art?! (2012). In 2021, Torbert appeared as a guest judge on an episode of the second season of Canada's Drag Race.

== Personal life ==
=== Tattoos ===
Torbert is heavily tattooed, getting her first tattoo (an Egyptian Eye of Horus) when she was sixteen years old. Her tattoos include a symbol of the Tao, Japanese writing, Buddhist poetry and images (such as the Bodhisattva), and Hindu imagery; she has stated on MTV that her favorite tattoo, on her left arm, reads "Survivor".

=== Relationships ===
In her late teens, Torbert married Brett Hopkins, the drummer in her band Gorilla Gorilla. They divorced after six months. In September 2007, she married Ian Walker, a sports writer for the Vancouver Sun. Their marriage ended in divorce in 2011, about four years later. Her third marriage was to guitarist Steve "Snake" Allen in 2016. By December 2025, she had confirmed that this marriage had also ended. Torbert identifies as polyamorous and pansexual.

=== Health ===
In January 2008, she announced that she had been diagnosed with breast cancer, and underwent a lumpectomy and chemotherapy. In a 2025 interview with Between the Covers magazine] Naked revealed she underwent a cardiac procedure to close a hole in her heart and that her ovaries were removed at age 36. She has also trained as a death doula and works in palliative care. Torbert is a vegan.

=== Honours ===
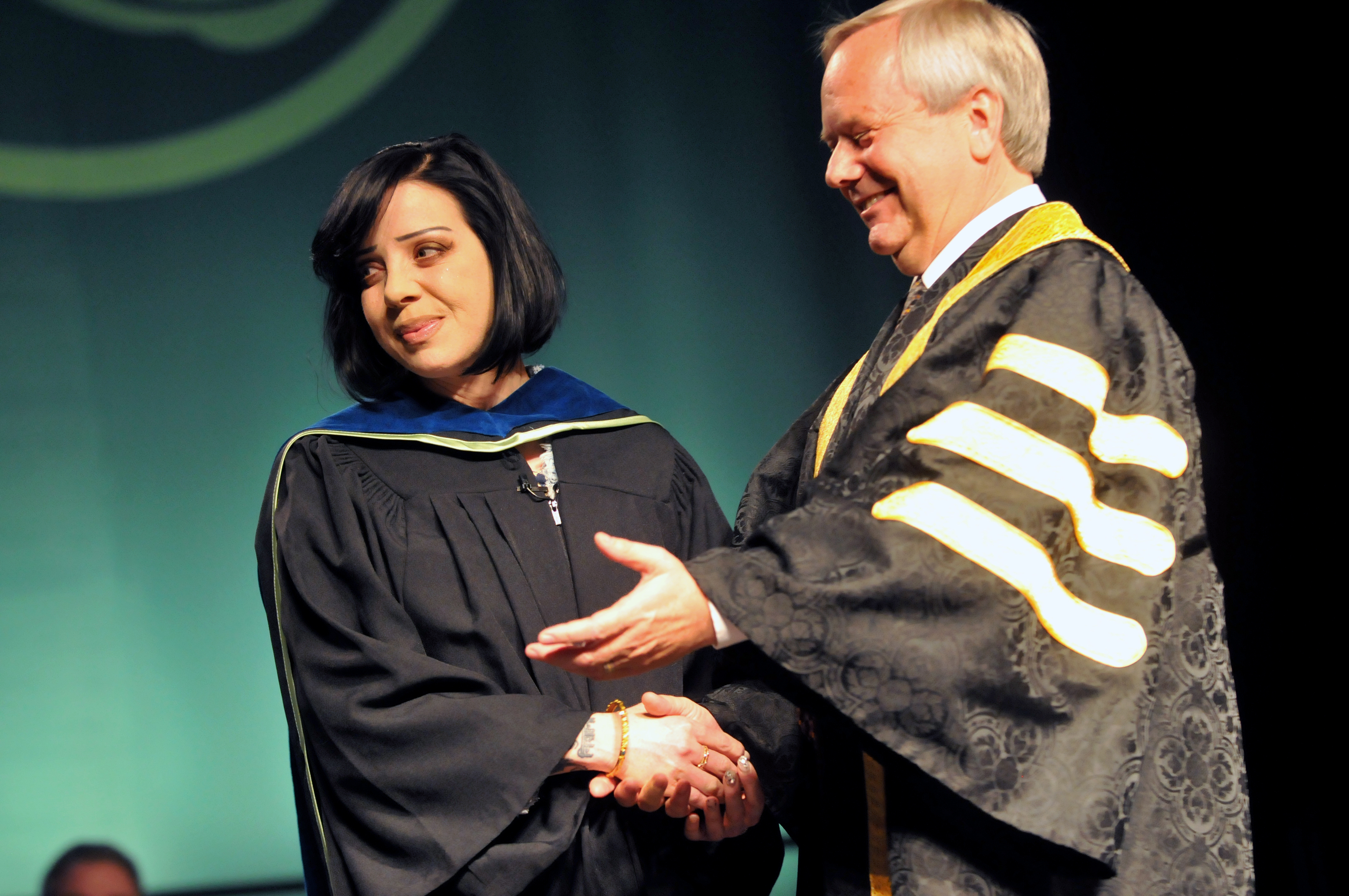
Torbert at the University of the Fraser Valley receiving an honorary degree in 2013

Torbert spoke at the University of the Fraser Valley for International Women's Day on March 8, 2013, at the Abbotsford campus; it was announced she would be awarded an honorary doctorate from the university in June 2013.

Her memoir I Bificus was published by HarperCollins in 2016.

== Discography ==
=== Studio albums ===
- Bif Naked – 1994
- I Bificus – 1998 (CRIA – Platinum) US CMJ #67
- Purge – 2001 (CRIA – Gold)
- Superbeautifulmonster – 2005 (No. 12 CAN)
- The Promise – 2009 (No. 30 CAN)
- Champion – 2024

=== EPs and compilations ===
- Four Songs and a Poem – 1994
- Okenspay Ordway: Things I Forgot to Tell Mommy – 1997
- Another 5 Songs and a Poem – 2000
- Essentially Naked – 2003 (No. 40 CAN)
- Bif Naked Forever: Acoustic Hits & Other Delights – 2012

=== Singles ===
Year	Single	Peak positions	Album
Year	Single	CAN	Album
1995	"Tell on You"	—	Bif Naked
1995	"My Whole Life"	—	Bif Naked
1995	"Everything"		Bif Naked
1996	"Daddy's Getting Married"	—	Bif Naked
1998	"Spaceman"	2	I Bificus
1998	"Chotee"	39	I Bificus
1998	"Lucky"	11	I Bificus
1999	"Moment of Weakness"	—	I Bificus
2000	"Twitch"	—	Another 5 Songs and a Poem
2000	"We're Not Gonna Take It"	—	Another 5 Songs and a Poem
2001	"I Love Myself Today"	—	Purge
2002	"Tango Shoes"	—	Purge
2003	"Leader"	—	Purge
2003	"Choking on the Truth"	—	Purge
2003	"Rich and Filthy"	—	Essentially Naked
2004	"Back in the Day"	—	Essentially Naked
2005	"Let Down"	—	Superbeautifulmonster
2005	"Nothing Else Matters"	—	Superbeautifulmonster
2006	"Everyday"	—	Superbeautifulmonster
2006	"The World Is Over"	—	Superbeautifulmonster
2007	"My Greatest Masterpiece"	—	Crossing – Soundtrack
2009	"Fuck You 2"	—	The Promise
2009	"Sick"	—	The Promise
2009	"King of Karma"	—	The Promise
2012	"So Happy I Could Die"	—	Bif Naked Forever: (Acoustic Hits & Other Delights)
2014	"The Only One"	—	Bif Naked Forever: (Acoustic Hits & Other Delights)
2018	"HEAVY" (feat. Snake and the Chain)	—	Non-album single
"—" denotes releases that did not chart

=== Music videos ===
- "Everything" (1994)
- "My Whole Life"
- "Tell on You"
- "Never Alone"
- "Daddy's Getting Married" (directed by William Morrison 1996)
- "Spaceman"
- "Lucky" (co-directed by Peter Karroll)
- "Moment of Weakness" (1999) (directed by Marcos Siega)
- "We're Not Gonna Take It"
- "Chotee"
- "Twitch" (1999) (directed by Peter Karroll)
- "I Love Myself Today"
- "Tango Shoes" (directed by Neill Blomkamp (District 9 / Chappie)
- "Choking in the Truth" (directed by Neill Blomkamp (District 9 / Chappie)
- "Back in the Day" (co-directed by Peter Karroll)
- "Rich and Filthy"
- "Let Down" (directed by Peter Karroll)
- "Nothing Else Matters"
- "Everyday" (directed by Peter Karroll)
- "My Greatest Masterpiece" (2007)
- "Fuck You 2" (2009)
- "Sick" (2009)
- "King of Karma" (2009)
- "Only One" 2016 directed by Coco Karroll
- "Heavy" 2018 directed by Peter Karroll
- "Jim" (2020)

== See also ==
- Canadian rock
- Music of Canada
