= Anne Murray discography =

- Studio albums: 32
- Live albums: 1
- Compilation albums: 15
- Singles: 76
- Video albums: 6
- Music videos: 8
- Christmas albums: 8

The discography for Canadian country-pop singer Anne Murray includes 32 studio albums, 15 compilation albums and 76 singles. Murray has sold over 55 million records across the world, becoming one of the best-selling Canadian artists in history. She has scored 10 number one hits on the Hot Country Songs and 8 on the Adult Contemporary Chart.

According to the Recording Industry Association of America, Murray has certified sales of 15.5 million records in the US. In 1987, she became the first female country artist to earn a triple platinum album. Murray was also the first Canadian female solo artist to score a number one hit on US Billboard charts. Her catalogue has amassed over 1 billion streams.

== Studio albums ==
=== 1960s ===
Title	Details	Peak positions
Title	Details	CAN
What About Me	Release date: 1968; Label: Arc Records	—
This Way Is My Way	Release date: 1969; Label: Capitol Records	13
"—" denotes releases that did not chart

=== 1970s ===
Title	Details	Peak chart positions					Certifications (sales thresholds)
Title	Details	CAN Country	CAN	AUS	US Country	US	Certifications (sales thresholds)
Honey, Wheat and Laughter	Release date: 1970; Label: Capitol Records	—	16	—	—	—	
Straight, Clean and Simple	Release date: February 26, 1971; Label: Capitol Records	—	4	—	11	121	
Talk It Over in the Morning	Release date: 1971; Label: Capitol Records	—	3	—	26	179	
Anne Murray / Glen Campbell (with Glen Campbell)	Release date: November 1971; Label: Capitol Records	—	12	—	4	128	
Annie	Release date: April 1972; Label: Capitol Records	—	1	—	14	143	
Danny's Song	Release date: April 1973; Label: Capitol Records	—	5	—	4	39	CAN: Gold
Love Song	Release date: February 1974; Label: Capitol Records	—	5	—	—	24	
Highly Prized Possession	Release date: November 1974; Label: Capitol Records	—	26	96	8	70	
Together	Release date: November 1975; Label: Capitol Records	—	—	—	15	142	
Keeping in Touch	Release date: September 1976; Label: Capitol Records	—	64	—	26	96	
There's a Hippo in My Tub (Note: Re-issued in 1979 as Anne Murray Sings for the Sesame Street Generation)	Release date: 1977; Label: Capitol Records	—	55	44	—	—	CAN: Platinum
Let's Keep It That Way	Release date: February 1978; Label: Capitol Records	1	1	13	2	12	CAN: 2× Platinum; Hong Kong : Platinum; ARIA: Gold; US: Platinum
New Kind of Feeling	Release date: January 1979; Label: Capitol Records	1	6	23	2	23	CAN: Platinum; US: Platinum; Hong Kong: Gold
I'll Always Love You	Release date: October 1979; Label: Capitol Records	1	18	86	4	24	CAN: Platinum; US: Gold
"—" denotes releases that did not chart

=== 1980s ===
Title	Details	Peak chart positions					Certifications (sales thresholds)
Title	Details	CAN Country	CAN	AUS	US Country	US	Certifications (sales thresholds)
Somebody's Waiting	Release date: March 1980; Label: Capitol Records	1	32	61	15	88	CAN: Gold
Where Do You Go When You Dream	Release date: 1981; Label: Capitol Records	—	7	69	4	55	CAN: Platinum; US: Gold
The Hottest Night of the Year	Release date: 1982; Label: Capitol Records	—	70	—	29	90	CAN: Gold
A Little Good News	Release date: 1983; Label: Capitol Records	3	57	—	9	72	CAN: Gold; US: Gold
Heart over Mind	Release date: 1984; Label: Capitol Records	—	59	—	4	92	CAN: Gold; US: Gold
Something to Talk About	Release date: 1986; Label: Capitol Records	—	22	—	2	68	CAN: Gold; US: Gold
Harmony	Release date: 1987; Label: Capitol Records	—	45	82	9	149	CAN: Gold
As I Am	Release date: 1988; Label: Capitol Records	18	80	151	29	—	
"—" denotes releases that did not chart

=== 1990s ===
Title	Details	Peak chart positions					Certifications (sales thresholds)
Title	Details	CAN Country	CAN	AUS	US Country	US	Certifications (sales thresholds)
You Will	Release date: October 29, 1990; Label: Capitol Records	—	—	—	47	—	
Yes I Do	Release date: August 27, 1991; Label: Liberty Records	23	—	—	—	—	
Croonin'	Release date: November 2, 1993; Label: EMI Music Canada/SBK	1	14	60	54	—	CAN: Platinum
Anne Murray	Release date: August 6, 1996; Label: EMI Music Canada/SBK	10	48	6	—	—	CAN: Gold
What a Wonderful World (Note: What a Wonderful World peaked at number 1 on Billboard Top Contemporary Christian chart.)	Release date: October 19, 1999; Label: StraightWay Records/EMI	6	—	—	4	38	CAN: Platinum; US: Platinum
"—" denotes releases that did not chart

=== 2000s ===
Title	Details	Peak chart positions			Certifications (sales thresholds)
Title	Details	CAN	US Country	US	Certifications (sales thresholds)
Country Croonin'	Release date: October 22, 2002; Label: StraightWay Records/EMI	—	13	109	CAN: Platinum; US: Gold
I'll Be Seeing You	Release date: October 19, 2004; Label: StraightWay Records/EMI	—	—	—	
Duets: Friends & Legends	Release date: November 13, 2007; Label: Manhattan Records/EMI	3	8	42	CAN: 2× Platinum
"—" denotes releases that did not chart

== Christmas albums ==
Title	Details	Peak chart positions					Certifications (sales thresholds)
Title	Details	CAN	AUS	US Country	US	US Holiday	Certifications (sales thresholds)
Christmas Wishes	Release date: 1981; Label: Capitol Records	—	62	34	54	19	CAN: 3× Platinum; US: 2× Platinum
Anne Murray Christmas	Release date: 1988; Label: Capitol Records	—	—	—	—	25	CAN: Gold
The Season Will Never Grow Old	Release date: 1993; Label: Hallmark Cards	—	—	—	—	—	
Best of the Season	Release date: 1994; Label: Capitol Records/SBK	—	—	—	—	—	CAN: Gold
My Christmas Favorites	Release date: June 16, 1995; Label: EMI	—	—	—	—	—	
What a Wonderful Christmas (Note: What a Wonderful Christmas peaked at number 4 on Billboard Top Contemporary Christian chart.)	Release date: October 9, 2001; Label: StraightWay Records/EMI	—	—	6	83	5	CAN: Gold
Anne Murray's Christmas Album	Release date: October 7, 2008; Label: Manhattan Records/EMI	13	—	35	169	21	
Icon: Christmas	Release date: September 30, 2014; Label: Capitol Records/Universal	—	—	—	—	—	
"—" denotes releases that did not chart

== Compilation albums ==
Title	Details	Peak chart positions					Certifications (sales thresholds)
Title	Details	CAN Country	CAN	AUS	US Country	US	Certifications (sales thresholds)
Snowbird	Release date: 1970; Label: Capitol Records	—	—	—	5	41	US: Gold
Country	Release date: August 1974; Label: Capitol Records	—	12	—	6	32	US: Gold
A Country Collection	Release date: 1980; Label: Capitol Records	2	—	—	7	73	
Anne Murray Collection	Release date: 1979; Label: EMI Singapore	—	—	—	—	—	Hong Kong: Gold
Anne Murray's Greatest Hits	Release date: November 1980; Label: Capitol Records	1	7	8	2	16	AUS: Platinum; CAN: 6× Platinum; US: 4× Platinum; NZ: Platinum
Country Hits	Release date: 1987; Label: Capitol Records	—	—	—	—	—	
Songs of the Heart	Release date: 1987; Label: Capitol Records	—	—	—	—	—	
Love Songs	Release date: 1989; Label: Capitol Records	—	—	—	—	—	
Greatest Hits Volume II	Release date: September 18, 1989; Label: Capitol Records	—	52	—	32	—	CAN: Gold; NZ: Platinum
From Springhill to the World	Release date: 1990; Label: Anne Murray Centre	—	—	—	—	—	
Her Greatest Hits and Finest Performances	Release date: 1990; Label: Reader's Digest	—	—	—	—	—	CAN: Platinum
The Very Best of Anne Murray	Release date: 1991; Label: Heartland Music	—	—	—	—	—	US: Gold; NZ: Gold; UK: Silver
15 of the Best	Release date: May 2, 1992; Label: Liberty Records	17	—	—	62	—	CAN: Platinum
Now & Forever	Release date: 1994; Label: Capitol Records/SBK	—	—	—	—	—	
The Best…So Far	Release date: November 29, 1994; Label: Capitol Records/SBK	2	—	—	—	—	CAN: Platinum; US: Platinum
Ultimate Collection	Release date: November 2001; Label: EMI	—	—	—	—	—	
All of Me (Note: All of Me is the U.S. version of I'll Be Seeing You with a bonus greatest hits disc included.)	Release date: January 25, 2005; Label: StraightWay Records/EMI	—	—	—	13	66	
10 Great Songs: Inspirational Classics	Release date: April 3, 2012; Label: Capitol Records	—	—	—	64	—	
Icon	Release date: May 14, 2013; Label: Capitol Records/Universal Music	—	—	—	—	—	
Here You Are	Release date: September 5, 2025; Label: Universal Music Canada	—		—	—		
"—" denotes releases that did not chart

== Live albums ==
Title	Details	Peak chart positions		Certifications (sales thresholds)
Title	Details	CAN Country	US Country	Certifications (sales thresholds)
An Intimate Evening with Anne Murray	Release date: September 16, 1997; Label: Capitol Records/SBK	8	45	CAN: Gold

== Singles ==
=== 1960s and 1970s ===
Year	Single	Peak chart positions										Certifications (sales threshold)	Album
Year	Single	CAN Country	CAN	CAN AC	US Country	US	US AC	AUS	IRE	NZ	UK	Certifications (sales threshold)	Album
1968	"It's All Over"	—	—	—	—	—	—	—	—	—	—		What About Me
1969	"Some Birds" / "For Baby"	—	—	—	—	—	—	—	—	—	—		What About Me
1969	"Thirsty Boots"	—	—	36	—	—	—	—	—	—	—		This Way Is My Way
1970	"Bidin' My Time"	48	87	—	—	—	—	—	—	—	—		This Way Is My Way
1970	"Snowbird"	1	2	—	10	8	1	77	20	3	23	US: Gold	This Way Is My Way
1971	"Sing High, Sing Low"	1	4	1	53	83	21	—	—	20	—		Straight, Clean and Simple
1971	"A Stranger in My Place"	1	18	1	27	122	—	—	—	—	—		Straight, Clean and Simple
1971	"It Takes Time"	6	26	1	—	—	—	—	—	—	—		Straight, Clean and Simple
1971	"Talk It Over in the Morning"	1	12	1	—	57	7	—	—	—	—		Talk It Over in the Morning
1972	"Cotton Jenny"	1	1	1	11	71	32	—	—	—	—		Talk It Over in the Morning
1972	"Destiny"	—	—	—	—	—	—	—	—	—	41		Talk It Over in the Morning
1972	"Robbie's Song for Jesus"	17	17	7	—	—	—	—	—	—	—		Annie
1972	"Danny's Song"	1	1	1	10	7	1	87	—	—	—		Danny's Song
1973	"What About Me"	2	22	1	20	64	2	93	—	15	—		Danny's Song
1973	"Send a Little Love My Way"	10	25	6	79	72	10	—	—	—	—		Love Song
1973	"A Love Song"	1	1	1	5	12	1	88	—	—	—		Love Song
1974	"You Won't See Me"	—	5	4	—	8	1	49	—	13	—		Love Song
1974	"Just One Look"	—	11	—	—	86	50	—	—	—	—		Love Song
1974	"Day Tripper"	—	23	—	—	59	40	—	—	—	—		Highly Prized Possession
1975	"Uproar"	27	45	18	28	—	—	—	—	—	—		Highly Prized Possession
1975	"A Stranger in My Place" (re-release)	—	—	—	79	—	—	—	—	—	—		Straight, Clean and Simple
1975	"Sunday Sunrise"	—	—	13	49	98	13	—	—	—	—		Together
1976	"The Call"	5	52	13	19	91	6	—	—	—	—		Together
1976	"Golden Oldie"	18	—	18	41	—	44	—	—	—	—		Keeping in Touch
1976	"Things"	10	—	23	22	89	12	—	—	—	—		Keeping in Touch
1977	"Sunday School to Broadway"	23	—	28	57	—	42	—	—	—	—		Keeping in Touch
1978	"Walk Right Back"	2	32	3	4	103	15	—	—	33	—		Let's Keep It That Way
1978	"You Needed Me"	1	1	1	4	1	3	2	7	6	22	US: Gold; Can: Platinum	Let's Keep It That Way
1978	"Hey, Daddy" / "Sleepy Time"	32	—	31	—	—	—	—	—	—	—		There's a Hippo in My Tub
1979	"I Just Fall in Love Again"	1	1	1	1	12	1	46	—	—	58		New Kind of Feeling
1979	"Shadows in the Moonlight"	1	10	1	1	25	1	95	—	—	—		New Kind of Feeling
1979	"Broken Hearted Me"	1	15	1	1	12	1	—	—	—	—		I'll Always Love You
"—" denotes releases that did not chart

=== 1980s ===
Year	Single	Peak chart positions								Album
Year	Single	CAN Country	CAN	CAN AC	US Country	US	US AC	AUS	UK	Album
1980	"Daydream Believer"	1	17	1	3	12	1	94	61	I'll Always Love You
1980	"Lucky Me"	4	58	1	9	42	8	—	—	Somebody's Waiting
1980	"I'm Happy Just to Dance with You"	10	74	1	23	64	13	—	—	Somebody's Waiting
1980	"Could I Have This Dance"	1	19	1	1	33	3	29	—	Anne Murray's Greatest Hits
1981	"Blessed Are the Believers"	1	13	1	1	34	10	—	—	Where Do You Go When You Dream
1981	"We Don't Have to Hold Out"	5	—	1	16	—	33	—	—	Where Do You Go When You Dream
1981	"It's All I Can Do"	1	—	1	9	53	14	—	—	Where Do You Go When You Dream
1982	"Another Sleepless Night"	1	—	1	4	44	11	97	—	Where Do You Go When You Dream
1982	"Hey! Baby"	1	—	1	7	—	26	—	—	The Hottest Night of the Year
1982	"Somebody's Always Saying Goodbye"	3	—	1	7	—	36	—	—	The Hottest Night of the Year
1983	"A Little Good News"	1	—	2	1	74	11	92	—	A Little Good News
1984	"That's Not the Way (It's S'posed to Be)"	22	—	5	46	106	12	—	—	A Little Good News
1984	"Just Another Woman in Love"	1	—	1	1	—	7	—	—	A Little Good News
1984	"Nobody Loves Me Like You Do" (with Dave Loggins)	1	79	1	1	103	10	—	—	Heart Over Mind
1985	"Time Don't Run Out on Me"	1	—	2	2	—	11	—	—	Heart Over Mind
1985	"I Don't Think I'm Ready for You"	4	—	2	7	—	30	—	—	Heart Over Mind
1986	"Now and Forever (You and Me)"	1	12	2	1	92	7	76	—	Something to Talk About
1986	"Who's Leaving Who"	—	93	15	62	—	26	—	—	Something to Talk About
1986	"My Life's a Dance"	41	—	23	26	—	—	—	—	Something to Talk About
1986	"Heartaches"	—	—	—	—	—	—	—	—	Something to Talk About
1986	"On and On"	24	—	—	23	—	—	—	—	Something to Talk About
1987	"Are You Still in Love with Me"	10	—	8	20	—	33	—	—	Harmony
1987	"Anyone Can Do the Heartbreak"	—	—	4	27	—	—	—	—	Harmony
1988	"Perfect Strangers" (with Doug Mallory)	—	—	19	52	—	—	—	—	Harmony
1988	"Flying on Your Own"	34	65	49	52	—	—	—	—	As I Am
1988	"Slow Passin' Time"	48	—	—	36	—	—	—	—	As I Am
1989	"Who But You"	58	—	—	55	—	—	—	—	As I Am
1989	"I'll Be Your Eyes"	44	—	—	—	—	—	—	—	As I Am
1989	"If I Ever Fall in Love Again" (with Kenny Rogers)	9	—	6	28	—	—	—	—	Greatest Hits Volume II
"—" denotes releases that did not chart

=== 1990s and 2000s ===
Year	Single	Peak chart positions				Album
Year	Single	CAN Country	CAN	CAN AC	US Country	Album
1990	"I'd Fall in Love Tonight"	55	—	—	— (Note: "I'd Fall in Love Tonight" did not chart on Hot Country Songs, but peaked at No. 8 on Hot Country Radio Breakouts.)	Greatest Hits Volume II
1990	"Feed This Fire"	6	—	2	5	You Will
1990	"Bluebird"	3	—	—	39	You Will
1991	"New Way Out"	39	—	16	—	You Will
1991	"You Will"	—	—	—	—	You Will
1991	"Everyday"	42	—	—	56	Yes I Do
1992	"I Can See Arkansas"	9	—	—	—	Yes I Do
1993	"Make Love to Me"	6	43	3	—	Croonin'
1994	"The Wayward Wind"	7	70	6	—	Croonin'
1994	"Born to Be with You"	—	—	18	—	Croonin'
1994	"Over You"	29	85	11	—	The Best...So Far
1996	"What Would It Take" (with Bryan Adams)	49	28	7	—	Anne Murray
1996	"That's What My Love Is For" (with Aaron Neville)	—	—	15	—	Anne Murray
1997	"That's the Way It Goes"	—	—	19	—	Anne Murray
1999	"Let There Be Love" (with Dawn Langstroth)	—	—	23	—	What a Wonderful World
2000	"What a Wonderful World"	—	—	42	—	What a Wonderful World
"—" denotes releases that did not chart

== Other singles ==
=== Singles with Glen Campbell ===
Year	Single	Peak chart positions						Album
Year	Single	CAN Country	CAN	CAN AC	US Country	US	US AC	Album
1971	"I Say a Little Prayer/ By the Time I Get to Phoenix"	1	19	1	40	81	13	Anne Murray & Glen Campbell
1972	"United We Stand"	—	—	—	—	—	—	Anne Murray & Glen Campbell
"—" denotes releases that did not chart

=== Guest singles ===
Year	Single	Artist	Peak chart positions		Album
Year	Single	Artist	CAN	CAN AC	Album
1985	"Tears Are Not Enough"	Northern Lights	1	1	We Are the World

=== Charted B-sides ===
Year	Song	Peak chart positions			Original A-side
Year	Song	CAN Country	CAN AC	US Country	Original A-side
1971	"Put Your Hand in the Hand"	—	—	67	"It Takes Time"
1974	"He Thinks I Still Care"	11	—	1	"You Won't See Me"
1974	"Son of a Rotten Gambler"	3	1	5	"Just One Look"
"—" denotes releases that did not chart

== Videos and DVDs ==
- Anne Murray (1991)
- Anne Murray in Nova Scotia (1993)
- Anne Murray: A Classic Christmas (1995)
- An Intimate Evening with Anne Murray (1997)
- Anne Murray: What a Wonderful World (2001)
- Anne Murray in Jamaica (2005)

== Music videos ==
Year	Song title	Director(s)
1983	"A Little Good News"	
1983	"That's Not the Way (It's S'posed to Be)"	
1985	"Time Don't Run Out on Me"	Peter Heath
1986	"Now and Forever (You and Me)"	Tony Greco
1986	"Who's Leaving Who"	Tony Greco
1987	"Are You Still in Love with Me"	Jack Cole/John Lloyd Miller
1988	"Flying on Your Own"	Jack Cole
1989	"If I Ever Fall in Love Again"	Ron Meraska
1992	"I Can See Arkansas"	Steven Goldmann
1993	"Make Love to Me"	Philip Kates
1993	"The Wayward Wind"	
1996	"What Would It Take"	
1999	"Let There Be Love" (with Dawn Langstroth)	Steven Goldmann

== Books ==
- Anne Murray: What a Wonderful World (2000) Balmur Book Publishing
- Anne Murray Centre Scrapbook (2000) Raincoast Books/Balmur Publishing
- All of Me (2009) Knopf Canada (autobiography)
