= Country (Anne Murray album) =

Greatest hits album by Anne Murray
- Released: August 1974
- Recorded: 1969–1973
- Genre: Country
- Length: 28:59
- Label: Capitol
- Producer: Brian Ahern

Anne Murray chronology
Love Song (1974)	Country (1974)	Highly Prized Possession (1974)

Professional ratings
Review scores
Source	Rating
Christgau's Record Guide	B

Country is an RIAA Gold-certified compilation album by Canadian Country artist Anne Murray, issued in 1974 on Capitol Records.

The album reached #6 on the Billboard Country albums chart and #32 on the Billboard Pop albums chart. The album included material from Murray's previous albums This Way Is My Way, Snowbird, Honey, Wheat and Laughter, Talk It Over in the Morning, Straight, Clean and Simple and Danny's Song,

== Track listing ==
1. "He Thinks I Still Care" (Dickey Lee, Steve Duffy) - 2:48
2. "Cotton Jenny" (Gordon Lightfoot) - 2:57
3. "Break My Mind" (John D. Loudermilk) - 2:43
4. "A Stranger in My Place" (Kenny Rogers, Kin Vassy) - 2:52
5. "Snowbird" (Gene MacLellan) - 2:08
6. "Son of a Rotten Gambler" (Chip Taylor) - 3:06
7. "Danny's Song" (Kenny Loggins) - 3:06
8. "What About Me" (Scott McKenzie) - 2:34
9. "Bidin' My Time" (MacLellan) - 2:32
10. "Put Your Hand in the Hand" (MacLellan) - 4:15

== Credits ==
- Paul White – executive producer
- Brian Ahern – producer, arrangements
- Rick Wilkins – string arrangements
- Carolyn Smith – cover artwork
- Balmur Limited – design
- Typesettra Ltd. – typography
