= Canadian Idol season 6 =

Canadian Idol
- Season 6
- Hosted by: Ben Mulroney
- Judges: Sass Jordan; Farley Flex; Zack Werner; Jake Gold
- Winner: Theo Tams
- Runner-up: Mitch MacDonald
- Finals venue: John Bassett Theatre

Release
- Original network: CTV
- Original release: June 3 – September 10, 2008

Season chronology
- ← Previous; Season 5

The sixth and final season of Canadian Idol is the sixth and final installation of the Idol series in Canada and premiered on June 3, 2008, on the CTV Television Network. It is again hosted by Ben Mulroney, with the addition of Jully Black as a special correspondent and general mentor to the contestants. Farley Flex, Jake Gold, Sass Jordan and Zack Werner all returned as judges. This season saw a number of major and minor show format changes in an effort to keep the franchise fresh and innovative. The final episode of the season, in which the Canadian Idol was crowned, aired on September 10, 2008. The winner of the sixth season was Theo Tams. The sixth season became the final season of Canadian Idol following its cancellation in 2009.

== Auditions ==
Auditions were held in the following cities:

- Edmonton, Alberta ( January 26–27): 1,000 Auditioned – 13 Received Gold
- Calgary, Alberta ( February 2–3): 1,000 Auditioned – 19 Received Gold
- Vancouver, British Columbia ( February 9–10): 1,000 Auditioned – 21 Received Gold
- Winnipeg, Manitoba ( February 22–23): 700 Auditioned – 24 Received Gold
- Hamilton, Ontario ( March 1–2): 1,000 Auditioned – 27 Received Gold
- Ottawa, Ontario ( March 8–9): 660 Auditioned – 20 Received Gold
- Montreal, Quebec ( March 15–16): 1,000 Auditioned – 27 Received Gold
- Halifax, Nova Scotia ( March 29–30): 450 Auditioned – 10 Received Gold
- St. John's, Newfoundland (April 8): 200 Auditioned – 6 Received Gold
- Toronto, Ontario ( April 12–13): 2,000 Auditioned – 34 Received Gold

Total Auditions: 9,010
Total Gold Tickets: 201

== Show Format Changes ==
This year of Canadian Idol had a number of changes and surprises to the usual show format.

- Jully Black joined the cast of Canadian Idol as the new correspondent and mentor.
- As introduced last season, competitors are allowed to play instruments in their auditions and performances.
- "Last Chance" Online Auditions were introduced to allow competitors who could not make it to an audition city/date, or who did not receive a gold ticket for their in-person audition, to submit a two-minute audition video on the Canadian Idol website (idol.ctv.ca) for consideration.
- This season, apparently due to the increase in extremely talented contestants, the number of semi-finalist was increased by 2, producing a Top 24. Also for the first time, the chosen semi-finalists were not evenly split between male and female performers: 15 men and 9 women made up the Top 24. Due to the uneven number of men and women, the performance groups during the semi-final rounds were also not being split according to gender. Additionally, during the semi-final elimination rounds the composition of the two performance groups varied from week to week; thus, unlike in previous years, a performer did not always compete against the same sub-group of semifinalists, or on the same performance night.
- Because of the increase in the total number of semi-finalist (24, instead of 22), the last week of semifinals saw 6 competitors (instead of the usual 4) eliminated in order to have a Top 10.
- Elimination song changed to "When I'm Gone" by Simple Plan.

== Broadcast Schedule ==
The sixth season of Canadian Idol premiered on June 3, 2008. Highlights from the initial auditions held across Canada, and the elimination rounds of "Toronto Week" (Top 200), were aired in 5 one-hour episodes over 3 weeks:

- Episode 1 (2008-06-03): Auditions held in Toronto, Calgary, Edmonton
- Episode 2 (2008-06-09): Auditions held in Montreal, Vancouver, Winnipeg
- Episode 3 (2008-06-10): Auditions held in Hamilton, Ottawa, St. Johns, Halifax
- Episode 4 (2008-06-16): Top 200 (day 1 & 2) Initial solo performances and group performances
- Episode 5 (2008-06-17): Top 200 (day 3) Final solo performances; selection of Top 24 announced

The semifinals (episodes 6–14) began airing June 23 and consisted of 3 weeks of eliminations, resulting in the selection of the final Top 10 contestants. In each of the 3 semifinal weeks, the contestants were split into two groups, one group performing each evening (aired Mondays and Tuesdays); and the results of the public voting are announced on Wednesday evening. The Top 10 was revealed on July 9 (the results show of the last semifinal elimination week).

The finals (episodes 15–32) began airing on July 14, 2008. Performances aired on Monday evenings and the results of the public voting were announced the following evening. Encore presentations of episodes are also broadcast on the now CTV-owned MuchMoreMusic on Thursday nights. The season finale aired September 10, 2008.

== Contestants ==
For this season, there was an unexpected format change. Because of the quality of some of the male singers, the producers and the judges decided to make a Top 24 containing the best singers, based on talent not gender. The semifinalists performed for three weeks in mixed-groups, meaning that eliminations were made regardless of gender, until the Top 10 was determined on July 9, 2008.

From a Top 24 composed of 15 males and 9 females (as selected by the judges), the Canada-wide voting during the 3 semifinal elimination rounds produced a final Top 10 comprising 8 male and 2 female contestants.

=== Top 10 Finalists ===
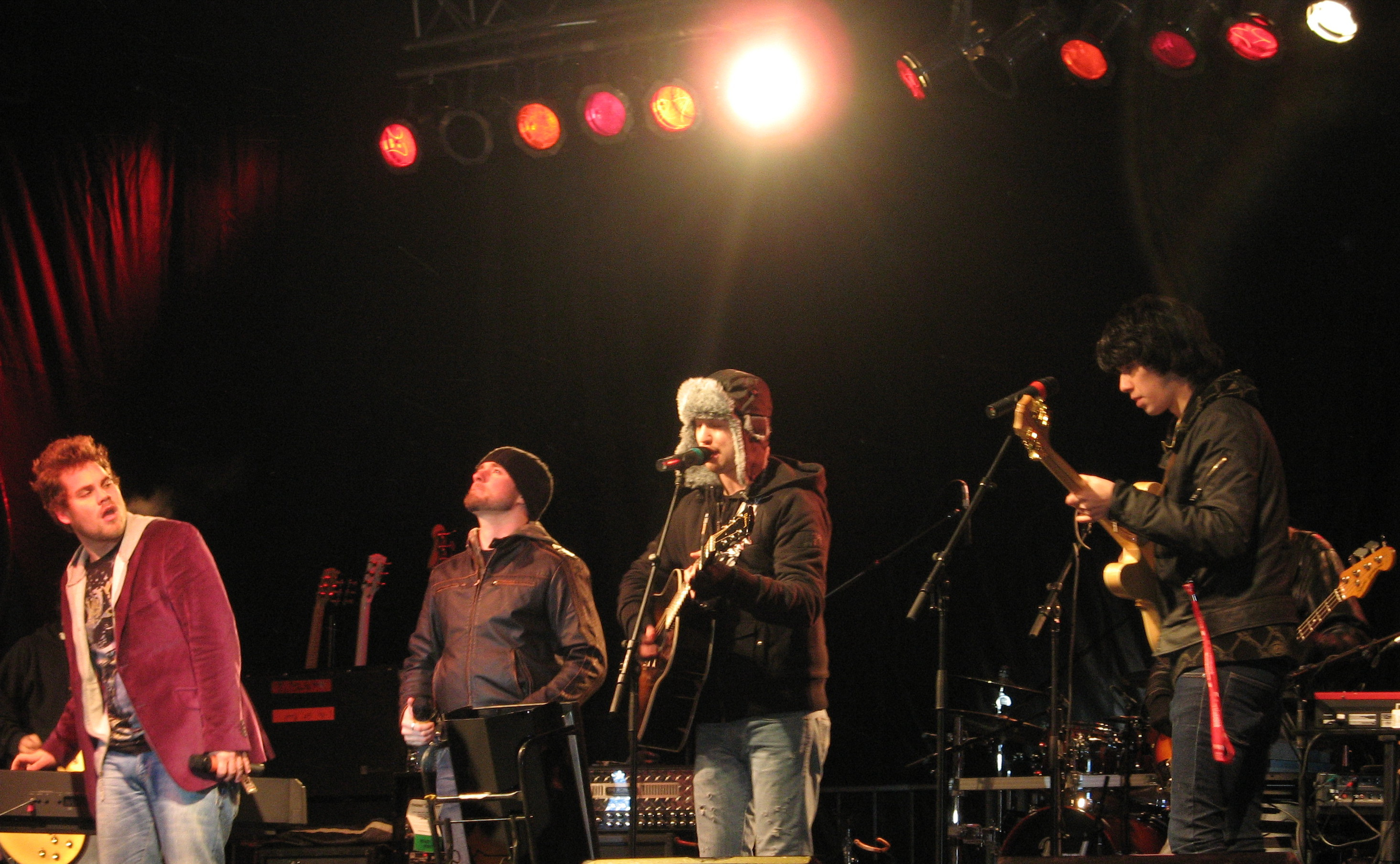
Left to right: Tams, Wright, and MacDonald (seen here with Morris, right) toured after the season concluded.

1. Theo Tams, 23, Lethbridge, AB, Student - WINNER, Canadian Idol, Season 6
2. Mitch MacDonald, 22, Port Hood, NS, Carpenter, Musician (Runner-up, 2008-09-10)
3. Drew Wright, 28, Collingwood, ON, Musician, House Painter (Eliminated 2008-09-02)
4. Earl Stevenson, 23, Lloydminster, AB, Swamper for a Backhoe Operator (Eliminated 2008-08-26)
5. Mookie Morris, 18, Toronto, ON, Musician (Eliminated 2008-08-19)
6. Amberly Thiessen, 19, Seven Persons, AB, Student (Eliminated 2008-08-12)
7. Mark Day, 20, Portugal Cove, NL, Student, Respite Care Worker (Eliminated 2008-08-05)
8. Sebastian Pigott, 25, Toronto, ON, Actor, Writer (Eliminated 2008-07-29)
9. Katherine St-Laurent, 17, Otterburn Park, QC, Student (Eliminated 2008-07-22)
10. Adam Castelli, 26, Hamilton, ON, Carpenter, Singer/Songwriter (Eliminated 2008-07-15)

=== Semifinalists ===
Eliminated 2008-07-09 from the Top 16:

- Marie-Pierre Bellerose, 25, Quebec City, QC, Bartender
- Katelyn Dawn, 19, Winnipeg, MB, Singer/Songwriter
- Martin Kerr, 25, Edmonton, AB, Independent Singer/Songwriter
- Omar Lunan, 29, Scarborough, ON, Registered Massage Therapist
- Gary Morissette, 21, Fruitvale, BC, Musician, Construction Worker
- Oliver Pigott, 27, Toronto, ON, Singer/Songwriter

Eliminated 2008-07-02 from the Top 20:

- Lisa Bell, 27, Winnipeg, MB, Coffee Shop Manager
- Paul Clifford, 26, Port Moody, BC, Bartender
- Jesse Cottam, 23, Calgary, AB, Music Teacher, Musician
- Jessica Sheppard, 22, Toronto, ON, Visual Manager

Eliminated 2008-06-25 from the Top 24:

- Lindsay Barr, 26, Halifax, NS, Singer, Writer, Art Student
- Shaun Francisco, 25, Vancouver, BC, Coffee Shop Barista
- Tetiana Ostapowych, 25, Toronto, ON, Session Singer/Songwriter/Server
- Lindsay Robins, 21, Montreal, QC, Singer/Songwriter

=== Regional Representation ===
The breakdown of the Top 24 and Top 10 according to the contestants' home province (provincial region), is as follows:

Region	Top 24	Top 10
BC	3	–
Prairies	7	3
Ontario	8	4
Quebec	3	1
Atlantic	3	2

Canadian Idol announced the regional representation of the Top 10 using different regional divisions than was used for the Top 24, as follows:

- West: 3
- East: 5
- Atlantic: 2

== The Semifinals (Top 24) ==
The semifinals consisted of three weeks of elimination rounds to reduce the Top 24 contestants (as chosen by the judges) to the final Top 10 (as decided by public vote). This was the first round in which eliminations are the result of public voting. Performances take place in a more intimate venue with a smaller stage and audience than the finals. Multiple contestants are eliminated each week.

This season, the semifinals saw a number of format changes: from the number of contestants (24, instead of 22), and an uneven gender composition (more males than females), to the performance group division (not by gender), and variation of group composition (changed from week to week). The semifinals results shows also saw some 'surprise' (unannounced) changes, including special 'showcase' performances and judge-selected 'encore' performances, and a variation in the number of contestants eliminated (6, instead of 4, in the final week).

=== Top 24 week ===
Performances:

Group 1 (2008-06-23)
1. Lindsay Barr – "Burning Love" (Elvis Presley)
2. Martin Kerr – "Lost Together" (Blue Rodeo)
3. Gary Morisette – "Good Golly, Miss Molly" (Little Richard)
4. Tetiana Ostapowych – "Feelings"
5. Mitch MacDonald – "Follow Through" (Gavin DeGraw)
6. Paul Clifford – "Broken" (Seether)
7. Earl Stevenson – "All Along the Watchtower" (Bob Dylan)
8. Lisa Bell – "Long Train Running" (The Doobie Brothers)
9. Mookie Morris – "Twist and Shout" (The Beatles)
10. Drew Wright – "Under Pressure" (Queen & David Bowie)
11. Oliver Pigott – "I Hear You Knockin' (But You Can't Come In)"
12. Katherine St-Laurent – "Total Eclipse of the Heart" (Bonnie Tyler)

Group 2 (2008-06-24)
1. Jesse Cottam – "Rebel Yell" (Billy Idol)
2. Mark Day – "Alone" (Heart)
3. Jessica Sheppard – "Get Here" (Oleta Adams)
4. Shaun Francisco – "Yellow" (Coldplay)
5. Lindsay Robins – "River Deep, Mountain High" (Ike & Tina Turner)
6. Omar Lunan – "Every Breath You Take" (The Police)
7. Marie-Pierre Bellerose – "You Know I'm No Good" (Amy Winehouse)
8. Sebastian Pigott – "Dark Horse"
9. Theo Tams – "Apologize" (Timbaland & OneRepublic)
10. Amberly Thiessen – "What Am I to You?"
11. Adam Castelli – "Mess Around"
12. Katelyn Dawn – "Hallelujah" (Leonard Cohen)

Results (2008-06-25):

The first 4 contestants eliminated from the Top 24 were (in order announced):

Group 1:
- Tetiana Ostapowych
- Lindsay Barr
Group 2:
- Lindsay Robins
- Shaun Francisco

(There was no bottom 3 announced for each group.)

The first results show departed from the traditional format to present a "showcase performance" from the Top 24, prior to announcing the voting results. The Top 24 performed the following songs, in groups of two to four, as follows:

- "Have You Ever Seen the Rain?" (Creedence Clearwater Revival) – Lindsay Robins, Paul Clifford, Shaun Francisco, Martin Kerr
- "In the Midnight Hour" (Wilson Pickett) – Adam Castelli, Lindsay Barr
- "Old Time Rock and Roll" (Bob Seger) – Mookie Morris, Earl Stevenson, Mark Day, Jessica Sheppard
- "Yellow" – Mitch MacDonald, Amberly Thiessen, Jesse Cottam, Katelyn Dawn
- "I Heard It Through the Grapevine" – Drew Wright, Omar Lunan, Gary Morisette
- "Fly Like an Eagle" – Tetiana Ostapowych, Oliver Pigott, Sebastian Pigott
- "Imagine" – Theo Tams, Lisa Bell, Marie-Pierre Bellerose, Katherine St-Laurent

=== Top 20 week ===
Performances:

Group 1 (2008-06-30)
1. Mark Day – "In Love with a Girl"
2. Paul Clifford – "Apparitions"
3. Drew Wright – "The Grace"
4. Marie-Pierre Bellerose – "Beautiful Goodbye"
5. Mookie Morris – "Naïve- The Kooks"
6. Sebastian Pigott – "Daydream" (The Lovin' Spoonful)
7. Martin Kerr – "In Your Eyes" (Peter Gabriel)
8. Lisa Bell – "(Sittin' On) The Dock of the Bay" (Otis Redding)
9. Gary Morisette – "Mr. Bojangles"
10. Amberly Thiessen – "Everything I Own"

Group 2 (2008-07-01)
1. Adam Castelli – "Gone till November"
2. Jessica Sheppard – "Umbrella" (Rihanna)
3. Jesse Cottam – "Iris" (Goo Goo Dolls)
4. Theo Tams – "Collide" (Howie Day)
5. Katelyn Dawn – "She Talks to Angels" (The Black Crowes)
6. Mitch MacDonald – "I'm Yours" (Jason Mraz)
7. Katherine St-Laurent – "The First Cut Is the Deepest" (Sheryl Crow)
8. Omar Lunan – "Ain't No Sunshine" (Bill Withers)
9. Earl Stevenson – "Something to Talk About" (Bonnie Raitt)
10. Oliver Pigott – "Sorry Seems to Be the Hardest Word"

Results (2008-07-02):

The bottom 3 contestants from each performance night were:

Group 1:
- Marie-Pierre Bellerose
- Paul Clifford – Eliminated
- Lisa Bell – Eliminated
Group 2:
- Adam Castelli
- Jesse Cottam – Eliminated
- Jessica Sheppard – Eliminated

The results show once again departed from traditional format, this time by having an encore of the judges' favorite performances from the previous two nights, prior to announcing the voting results. In order of performance, the encores were:

- Theo Tams – "Collide" chosen by Farley Flex
- Amberly Thiessen – "Everything I Own" chosen by Zack Werner
- Oliver Pigott – "Sorry Seems to Be the Hardest Word" chosen by Jake Gold
- Omar Lunan – "Ain't No Sunshine" chosen by Sass Jordan

=== Top 16 week ===
Performances:

Group 1 (2008-07-07)
1. Martin Kerr – "Fix You" (Coldplay)
2. Theo Tams – "Bubbly" (Colbie Caillat)
3. Amberly Thiessen – "You and I Both"
4. Adam Castelli – "If I Were a Carpenter"
5. Marie-Pierre Bellerose – "Piece of My Heart" (Janis Joplin)
6. Omar Lunan – "If Tomorrow Never Comes" (Garth Brooks)
7. Mark Day – "Against All Odds (Take a Look at Me Now)" (Phil Collins)
8. Mookie Morris – "Valerie" (Steve Winwood)

Group 2 (2008-07-08)
1. Mitch MacDonald – "Blue"
2. Gary Morisette – "The House of the Rising Sun" (The Animals)
3. Katelyn Dawn – "Zombie" (The Cranberries)
4. Oliver Pigott – "Lean on Me" (Bill Withers)
5. Sebastian Pigott – "Bring It On Home to Me"
6. Earl Stevenson – "Like a Rolling Stone" (Bob Dylan)
7. Katherine St-Laurent – "Love Is a Battlefield" (Pat Benatar)
8. Drew Wright – "The Reason" (Hoobastank)

Results (2008-07-09):

In order to have a final Top 10, the bottom 3 contestants from each performance night were eliminated (resulting in a total of 6 contestants eliminated – instead of 4, as in each of the previous two weeks of semifinal eliminations).

Contestants were called to the stage, four at a time (two from each performance night), and the results of the voting announced, sending successful contestants to fill the 10 stools set up on the stage for the final Top 10.

The 6 eliminated contestants were (in order revealed):

- Martin Kerr
- Gary Morisette
- Omar Lunan
- Katelyn Dawn
- Marie-Pierre Bellerose
- Oliver Pigott

== The Finals (Top 10) ==
The Top 10 was officially announced on July 9, 2008 (the last semifinals result show). These are the finalists (in order revealed):

- Mark Day
- Drew Wright
- Mookie Morris
- Earl Stevenson
- Theo Tams
- Katherine St-Laurent
- Amberly Thiessen
- Mitch MacDonald
- Adam Castelli
- Sebastian Pigott

With 8 male and 2 female contestants, the season's Top 10 was the most gender-uneven to date. Top 10 performances began July 14, 2008.

=== Mentors ===
The following were mentors for this season of Canadian Idol:

- Simple Plan
- Gavin Rossdale
- Bryan Adams
- Tom Jones
- Anne Murray
- John Legend
- Hedley

=== Finalists' Performances ===
Each week a song theme is presented to the competitors. Each competitor must base their song choice on the theme of the week.

Performance week theme:
- Top 24: Semifinals (contestant's choice)
- Top 20: Semifinals (contestant's choice)
- Top 16: Semifinals (contestant's choice)
- Top 10: The songs of David Bowie
- Top 9: "Rock and Roll Heaven" (classic songs by artists no longer living)
- Top 8: "Unplugged" with mentor Gavin Rossdale, former Bush front-man
- Top 7: Top 10 UK Hits with mentor Tom Jones
- Top 6: Canadian Rock with mentors Simple Plan
- Top 5: The music of The Beatles (judges choice)
- Top 4: The songs of Anne Murray, with mentor Anne Murray (each contestant sang one song from Anne Murray's songbook and one song by any artist they choose)
- Top 3: The songs of Bryan Adams, with mentor Bryan Adams
- Top 2: Season Finale, with mentors John Legend and Hedley (each contestant performed 3 songs: one of their choice, one selected by the judges, and the song designated for release as the "winner's single" should he win the competition)

Contestants (listed, after the winner, in reverse order of elimination):

Theo Tams, 23 (born July 12, 1985), Lethbridge, AB
1. Top 24: "Apologize" – OneRepublic
2. Top 20: "Collide" – Howie Day
3. Top 16: "Bubbly" – Colbie Caillat
4. Top 10: "Silly Boy Blue" – David Bowie
5. Top 9: "No Woman, No Cry" – Bob Marley & The Wailers
6. Top 8: "Weak in the Knees" – Serena Ryder
7. Top 7: "You Had Me" – Joss Stone - Bottom 3 (2008-08-05)
8. Top 6: "Sweet Ones" – Sarah Slean
9. Top 5: "The Long and Winding Road" – The Beatles
10. Top 4: "You Don't Know Me" – Cindy Walker and Eddy Arnold (covered by Anne Murray)
11. Top 4: "Chariot" – Gavin DeGraw
12. Top 3:"Heaven" – Bryan Adams
13. Top 3:"When You're Gone" – Bryan Adams
14. Top 2: "Good Mother" – Jann Arden
15. Top 2: "Sing" – Winner's single
16. Top 2: "I Wanna Know What Love Is" – Foreigner - WINNER (2008-09-10)

Mitch MacDonald, 22 (born October 22, 1985), Port Hood, NS (Only contestant never to place in the bottom 2 or 3)
1. Top 24: "Follow Through" – Gavin DeGraw
2. Top 20: "I'm Yours" – Jason Mraz
3. Top 16: "Blue" – The Jayhawks
4. Top 10: "Moonage Daydream" – David Bowie
5. Top 9: "Angel Eyes" – The Jeff Healey Band
6. Top 8: "Oh, Atlanta" – Alison Krauss
7. Top 7: "Jealous Guy" – John Lennon
8. Top 6: "I Love This Town" – Joel Plaskett
9. Top 5: "In My Life" – The Beatles
10. Top 4: "Cotton Jenny" – Gordon Lightfoot (covered by Anne Murray)
11. Top 4: "Between the Bars" – Elliott Smith
12. Top 3: "Heat of The Night" – Bryan Adams
13. Top 3: "When You Love Someone" – Bryan Adams
14. Top 2: "Paris" – Gordie Sampson
15. Top 2: "Where We Begin" – Winner's single
16. Top 2: "If" – Bread - Runner-up (2008-09-10)

Drew Wright, 28 (born October 5, 1979), Collingwood, ON
1. Top 24: "Under Pressure" – Queen
2. Top 20: "The Grace" – Neverending White Lights
3. Top 16: "The Reason" – Hoobastank
4. Top 10: "Five Years" – David Bowie
5. Top 9: "No Rain" – Blind Melon
6. Top 8: "Sunday Morning" – Maroon 5
7. Top 7: "Creep" – Radiohead
8. Top 6: "That Song" – Big Wreck - Bottom 3 (2008-08-12)
9. Top 5: "While My Guitar Gently Weeps" – The Beatles - Bottom 2 (2008-08-19)
10. Top 4: "Hey Daddy" – Anne Murray
11. Top 4: "Gravity" – John Mayer
12. Top 3: "Cuts Like a Knife" – Bryan Adams
13. Top 3: "I'm Ready" – Bryan Adams - Eliminated (2008-09-02)

Earl Stevenson, 23 (born February 18, 1985), Lloydminster, AB
1. Top 24: "All Along the Watchtower" – Bob Dylan
2. Top 20: "Something to Talk About" – Bonnie Raitt
3. Top 16: "Like a Rolling Stone" – Bob Dylan
4. Top 10: "Rock 'n' Roll Suicide" – David Bowie
5. Top 9: "Light My Fire" – The Doors (Jose Feliciano version)
6. Top 8: "Two" – Ryan Adams
7. Top 7: "Change the World" – Eric Clapton - Bottom 3 (2008-08-05)
8. Top 6: "Little Bones" – The Tragically Hip - Bottom 3 (2008-08-12)
9. Top 5: "With a Little Help From My Friends" – The Beatles
10. Top 4: "Killing Me Softly with His Song" – Roberta Flack (covered by Anne Murray)
11. Top 4: "The Joker" – Steve Miller Band - Eliminated (2008-08-26)

Mookie Morris, 18 (born September 19, 1989), Toronto, ON
1. Top 24: "Twist and Shout" – The Isley Brothers
2. Top 20: "Naïve" – The Kooks
3. Top 16: "Valerie" – The Zutons
4. Top 10: "The Man Who Sold The World" – David Bowie - Bottom 3 (2008-07-15)
5. Top 9: "I Feel Good" – James Brown
6. Top 8: "Ophelia" – The Band - Bottom 3 (2008-07-29)
7. Top 7: "Lola" – The Kinks
8. Top 6: "Magic Carpet Ride" – Steppenwolf
9. Top 5: "Come Together" – The Beatles - Eliminated (2008-08-19)

Amberly Thiessen, 19 (born October 17, 1988), Seven Persons, AB. (Last female contestant as of the Top 8.)
1. Top 24: "What Am I to You?" – Norah Jones
2. Top 20: "Everything I Own" – David Gates
3. Top 16: "You and I Both" – Jason Mraz
4. Top 10: "Space Oddity" – David Bowie (Natalie Merchant version)
5. Top 9: "Redemption Song" – Bob Marley - Bottom 3 (2008-07-22)
6. Top 8: "The Way I Am" – Ingrid Michaelson
7. Top 7: "Put Your Records On" – Corinne Bailey Rae
8. Top 6: "1234" – Feist - Eliminated (2008-08-12)

Mark Day, 20 (born May 29, 1988), Portugal Cove, NL
1. Top 24: "Alone" – Heart
2. Top 20: "In Love with a Girl" – Gavin DeGraw
3. Top 16: "Against All Odds (Take a Look at Me Now)" – Phil Collins
4. Top 10: "Dancing in the Street" – Martha and the Vandellas (David Bowie and Mick Jagger version)
5. Top 9: "Dance With My Father" – Luther Vandross
6. Top 8: "Stay" – Sugarland - Bottom 3 (2008-07-29)
7. Top 7: "Bleeding Love" – Leona Lewis - Eliminated (2008-08-05)

Sebastian Pigott, 25 (born 14 February 83), Toronto, ON
1. Top 24: "Dark Horse" – Amanda Marshall
2. Top 20: "Daydream" – The Lovin' Spoonful
3. Top 16: "Bring It On Home to Me" – Sam Cooke
4. Top 10: "Let's Spend The Night Together" – David Bowie - Bottom 3 (2008-07-15)
5. Top 9: "Love Me" – Elvis Presley - Bottom 2 (2008-07-22)
6. Top 8: "Lucille" – Little Richard - Eliminated (2008-07-29)

Katherine St-Laurent, 17 (born May 18, 1991), Otterburn Park, QC
1. Top 24: "Total Eclipse of the Heart" – Bonnie Tyler
2. Top 20: "The First Cut Is the Deepest" – Cat Stevens
3. Top 16: "Love Is a Battlefield" – Pat Benatar
4. Top 10: "Cat People (Putting Out Fire) – David Bowie
5. Top 9: "Move Over" – Janis Joplin - Eliminated (2008-07-22)

Adam Castelli, 26, Hamilton, ON
1. Top 24: "Mess Around" – Ray Charles
2. Top 20: "Gone till November" – Wyclef Jean - Bottom 3 (2008-07-02)
3. Top 16: "If I Were a Carpenter" – Tim Hardin
4. Top 10: "Rebel, Rebel" – David Bowie - Eliminated (2008-07-15)

=== Results Show Performances ===
The guests and songs performed during the results show broadcasts are listed here.

Top 10 results show (2008-07-15):
- No guest performer
- Group performances: "Golden Years" (Sebastian, Theo, Adam); "Changes" (Mark, Amberly, Katherine, Mitch); "Fame" (Mookie, Earl, Drew); "Modern Love" (entire group)
Top 9 results show (2008-07-22):
- Jaydee Bixby, Canadian Idol season 5 runner-up, "Old Fashioned Girl"
- Group performances: "Dream a Little Dream of Me" (Amberly, Katherine, Mark); "Purple Haze" (Drew, Earl, Mitch); "A Little Less Conversation" (Sebastian, Theo, Mookie – later joined by entire group)
Top 8 results show (2008-07-29):
- Gavin Rossdale, "Love Remains the Same"
- Group performance: "My Generation"
Top 7 results show (2008-08-05):
- Tom Jones, "It's Not Unusual", "If He Should Ever Leave You"
- Group performance: Medley of Tom Jones songs, "Green Green Grass of Home" (Mark, Amberly And Theo) and "Delilah" (Drew, Earl, Mookie, Mitch)
Top 6 results show (2008-08-12):
- Simple Plan, "Your Love Is a Lie"
- Group performance: "Money City Maniacs"
Top 5 results show (2008-08-19):
- No guest performer
- Group performances: Blackbird (Mitch), Eleanor Rigby (Drew), Get Back (Mookie), Revolution (Earl), Let It Be (Theo)
Top 4 results show (2008-08-26):
- Anne Murray, "Daydream Believer", "Could I Have This Dance"; Jordin Sparks, "One Step at a Time"
- Group performance: "Danny's Song"
Top 3 results show (2008-09-02):
- Bryan Adams
- Group performance: No group performance this night
Finale (2008-09-10):
- Hedley "Old School", Brian Melo "Back To Me", Jully Black "Queen", John Legend "Green Light", Mariah Carey "We Belong Together" and "I'm That Chick"
- Group performances: multiple performances by the Top 10, including "Can't Stop This Thing We Started (Bryan Adams), "What Kind of World Do You Want" (Five For Fighting), and "Home" (Daughtry) plus individual performances and Mitch and Theo sang "Hasn't Hit Me Yet" by Blue Rodeo; crowned Canadian Idol Theo Tams performed his winner's single, "Sing"
- Individual performances from the Top 10 include:

"Who Do You Love" (Adam Castelli), "Down On The Corner" (Sebastian Pigott), "When Will I Be Loved" (Amberly Thiessen), "You'll Be In My Heart" (Mark Day), "Feelin' Alright" (Earl Stevenson), "Crazy On You" (Katherine St-Laurent), "Papa's Got A Brand New Bag" (Mookie Morris), "Nowhere With You" (Mitch MacDonald), "I'm Still Standing" (Theo Tams), and "Are You Gonna Go My Way" (Drew Wright)

== Eliminations (Summary) ==
Legend
Female	Male	Top 10	Top 24

Stage:		Semi-Finals			Finals								
Week:		Top 24 6/25	Top 20 7/2	Top 16 7/9	Top 10 7/15	Top 9 7/22	Top 8 7/29	Top 7 8/5	Top 6 8/12	Top 5 8/19	Top 4 8/26	Top 3 9/2	Top 2 9/10
Place	Contestant	Result											
1	Theo Tams							Btm 3					Winner
2	Mitch MacDonald												Runner-Up
3	Drew Wright								Btm 3	Btm 2		Elim	
4	Earl Stevenson							Btm 3	Btm 3		Elim		
5	Mookie Morris				Btm 3		Btm 3			Elim			
6	Amberly Thiessen					Btm 3			Elim				
7	Mark Day						Btm 3	Elim					
8	Sebastian Pigott				Btm 3	Btm 2	Elim						
9	Katherine St-Laurent					Elim							
10	Adam Castelli		Btm 3		Elim								
11–16	Marie-Pierre Bellerose		Btm 3	Elim									
11–16	Katelyn Dawn			Elim									
11–16	Martin Kerr			Elim									
11–16	Omar Lunan			Elim									
11–16	Gary Morissette			Elim									
11–16	Oliver Pigott			Elim									
17–20	Lisa Bell		Elim										
17–20	Paul Clifford		Elim										
17–20	Jesse Cottam		Elim										
17–20	Jessica Sheppard		Elim										
21–24	Lindsay Barr	Elim											
21–24	Shaun Francisco	Elim											
21–24	Tetiana Ostapowych	Elim											
21–24	Lindsay Robins	Elim											

Notes:

- With the exception of the Top 9, Canadian Idol did not reveal which of the bottom three contestants received the third and second lowest number of votes; only the eliminated contestants were announced.
- Of the two female contestants that made it into the Top 10, as of the Top 8, there was only one female contestant remaining in the competition. As of the Top 5, there were no female contestants remaining in the competition; no other Idol competition (with the exception of Idol Serbia, Montenegro & Macedonia) became single-gender at such early stage of the competition.
- Katherine St-Laurent was the only contestant in the Top 10 to not have been in the bottom three before her elimination. Mitch MacDonald was the only contestant to have never been in the bottom three.

== Ratings ==
#	Air Date	Viewers Performance	Viewers Results
1	June 3, 2008	1,574,000	N/A
2	June 9–10, 2008	1,379,000	N/A
3	June 16–17, 2008	1,233,000	N/A
4	June 23–24, 2008	1,265,000	N/A
5	June 30 – July 1, 2008	896,000	N/A
6	July 7–8, 2008	984,000	N/A
7	July 14–15, 2008	1,308,000	957,000
8	July 21–22, 2008	1,192,000	1,117,000
9	July 28–29, 2008	984,000	850,000
10	August 4–5, 2008	1,189,000	1,229,000
11	August 11–12, 2008	931,000	865,000
12	August 18–19, 2008	1,128,000	952,000
13	August 25–26, 2008	1,269,000	1,110,000
14	September 1–2, 2008	1,334,000	1,157,000
15	September 8/10, 2008	1,467,000	1,377,000
