= Robbie MacNeill =

Canadian musician

- Born: 1946 or 1947 (age 79–80); Halifax, Nova Scotia, Canada
- Occupations: Surveyor, guitarist, singer-songwriter

Robbie MacNeill (age 79–80) is a guitarist and singer-songwriter who was born in Halifax, Nova Scotia, Canada. He attended Queen Elizabeth High School (Halifax, Nova Scotia) and studied engineering at Dalhousie University for two years, before moving to Toronto to work as a surveyor in 1964. In the late sixties and early 70's he arranged, conducted and performed with The Privateers, billed as 'Eastern Canada's Only Professional Folk Chorus'. He went on to work with a number of other artists, and released his own album 'Pieces' in 1984.

Robbie met Anne Murray in 1967, while both performed on CBC's Singalong Jubilee. She invited him to play backing guitar for her early tours of The Maritimes. Their first show together was at a high school, then they played weekend shows at venues such as The Prince Edward Lounge in Charlottetown, PEI, Wong's in Antigonish, Nova Scotia, and the Colonial Inn in Amherst, Nova Scotia. Other venues include: Yarmouth, Nova Scotia on October 28, 1968; Windsor, Nova Scotia on November 6, 1968; and Halifax, Nova Scotia from January 20 to February 1, 1969 at The Monteray Lounge (formerly at the corner of Quinpool and Robie). The latter series was well-attended by media including CBC Radio. Anne released singles Robbie wrote, including "Robbie's Song for Jesus" (also on Annie (Anne Murray album), "A Million More (also on Keeping in Touch" and 'Let Sunshine Have Its Day' (also on Danny's Song (album)). Her albums featured other songs he wrote including 'Lullaby' (on Highly Prized Possession) and 'Sleep Child' (on There's a Hippo in My Tub). In Anne's autobiography All of Me she wrote, "... in addition to being a fine guitar player was a wonderful songwriter. To this day his 'A Million More' is one of my favourite songs." Robbie also played on Anne's brother Bruce Murray's 1975 debut, which included a cover of Robbie's 'Sunshine Song'.

Robbie met John Allan Cameron on Singalong Jubilee around 1967, and from then on was his main backing guitarist for about 25 years. John Allan sometimes gave Robbie the spotlight to showcase his talent. In 1975 The Ottawa Citizen wrote, "Robbie MacNeill opened the second half. He is the essence of the good contemporary folk singer. His voice is clear and distinctive, and his solo guitar is all the accompaniment he needs. He wrote the songs he sang, including Sunshine Love and Evangeline - the beautifully haunting love song he nostalgically wrote for Nova Scotia before moving from Halifax to Toronto two years ago.". Evangeline was published in Coast to Coast Fever and covered by both Stan Rogers (From Coffee House to Concert Hall) and Raffi (Adult Entertainment). John Allan covered Robbie's Song for Jesus on his 1972 album 'Lord Of The Dance'. Robbie was the musical director for John Allan's series on CTV and produced (and sang) for his album 'Weddings, Wakes and Other Things'.

Other friends from Singalong Jubilee include Gene MacLellan and Brian Ahern (producer). Brian and Robbie formed a band that was briefly courted by the music industry in Toronto until a member quit. Brian handled Robbie's publishing under his company Tessa in the early 70's, but no album was recorded. Robbie was a member of the trio Country Fair (which later became Graham County), with Toronto singer-songwriter Don Graham. He performed with and produced Albert Hall, and contributed guitar to albums by Glen Reid and Vince Morash. He has performed solo at music festivals such as the Home County Folk Festival in London, Ontario the Vancouver Folk Music Festival and the Coffee House at the Coming Home to Brookfield annual celebration, in Brookfield, Nova Scotia.
