= Let's Keep It That Way =

Let's Keep it That Way

Studio album by Anne Murray
- Released: February 1978
- Studios: Eastern Sound (Toronto, Ontario, Canada)
- Genres: Pop; country
- Length: 32:48
- Label: Capitol
- Producer: Jim Ed Norman

Anne Murray chronology
There's a Hippo in My Tub (1977)	Let's Keep it That Way (1978)	New Kind of Feeling (1979)

Singles from Let's Keep It That Way
- 1. "Walk Right Back" Released: 1978; 2. "You Needed Me" Released: May 1978

Let's Keep It That Way is the fourteenth studio album by Anne Murray, released in February 1978. On the Canadian charts the album topped both the country and pop album charts. In the U.S., the album returned Murray to the top ten on the country album chart, a height she had not reached since 1974's Highly Prized Possession; on the pop album chart, the album reached No. 12 (and would ultimately be the highest-charting album of Murray's career on that chart). The album was subsequently certified Platinum (1,000,000 copies sold) by the RIAA.

Two singles were released from the album: first, a cover of the Everly Brothers' hit "Walk Right Back", which reached No. 4 on the U.S. country singles charts. The second single released, "You Needed Me", would ultimately become one of the biggest hits of Murray's career, topping all three Canadian charts; in the U.S. it reached No. 1 on the U.S. pop singles charts (becoming Murray's sole chart-topper on the Hot 100 charts), as well as No. 4 on the country singles charts, and No. 3 on the A/C charts. This track was also included in the UK issue of her next album, New Kind of Feeling. In addition to the two singles, the title track received substantial Adult Contemporary airplay as an album cut.

"You Needed Me" won Anne the Grammy Award for Best Female Pop Vocal Performance.

The title track, written by Curly Putman and Rafe Van Hoy and originally recorded by Tanya Tucker for her 1977 album Ridin' Rainbows, is sung from the point of view of a married woman who is having a one-night stand with a stranger who is apparently enamored by her.

In 1979, Juice Newton released her version of the title song "Let's Keep It That Way" as a single. It became her first Top 40 hit, reaching No. 37 on the Billboard Hot Country Singles chart.

Nancy Sinatra recorded a cover of "Let's Keep It That Way" that was released as a single by Elektra Records in 1980. It was later included on her 2009 digital-only collection, Cherry Smiles – The Rare Singles.

Mac Davis recorded "Let's Keep It That Way", taking his version to the top ten of the U.S. country singles chart in 1980.

The album's cover photo was taken by Murray's then husband, Bill Langstroth.

== Critical reception ==
The Globe and Mail wrote that Murray "needs the right producer, a person who knows how best to back up that puzzling voice of hers, which could be pop or could be country, but should be used as a vehicle for the graceful mixture of the two that brings success and trucks of ready cash to the likes of Linda Ronstadt."

== Track listing ==
No.	Title	Writer(s)	Length
1.	"Let's Keep It That Way"	Curly Putman, Rafe Van Hoy	3:34
2.	"Walk Right Back"	Sonny Curtis	2:38
3.	"Just to Feel This Love from You"	Dean McDougall, Jackie DeShannon	3:05
4.	"We Don't Make Love Anymore"	Kenny Rogers, Marianne Gordon	3:49
5.	"I Still Wish the Very Best for You"	Brent Titcomb, Richard Miller	3:10
6.	"You Needed Me"	Randy Goodrum	3:41
7.	"You're a Part of Me"	Kim Carnes	3:24
8.	"Hold Me Tight"	Johnny Nash	2:40
9.	"Tennessee Waltz"	Pee Wee King, Redd Stewart	2:45
10.	"There's Always a Goodbye"	Randy Richards	3:45

== Chart performance ==
Chart (1978)	Peak position
Canadian RPM Country Albums	1
Australia (Kent Music Report)	13

== Certifications ==
Region	Certification	Certified units/sales
Australia (ARIA)	Gold	20,000^{^}
United States (RIAA)	Platinum	1,000,000^{^}
^{^} Shipments figures based on certification alone.

== Personnel ==
Musicians

- Anne Murray – vocals, backing vocals (8, 10)
- Pat Riccio Jr. – acoustic piano (1, 3, 4, 6, 7, 10), electric piano (2, 9), organ (3, 8, 10)
- Doug Riley – acoustic piano (2, 9), electric piano (3, 4, 7)
- Bob Mann – guitars (1, 3–5, 9)
- Aidan Mason – guitars (1, 2, 6)
- Brian Russell – guitars (1–4, 6, 8–10)
- John Leslie Hug – guitars (5)
- JayDee Maness – steel guitar (1, 3, 4, 9)
- Bob Lucier – steel guitar (7)
- Pee Wee Charles – steel guitar (8, 10)
- Tom Szczesniak – bass, electric piano (5)
- Barry Keane – drums, percussion (8)
- Bill Hughes – backing vocals (5)
- Bruce Murray – backing vocals (8, 10)
- Deborah Schaal – backing vocals (8, 10)

Music arrangements

- Doug Riley – string arrangements (1, 4, 7, 9)
- Rick Wilkins – string arrangements (3, 6, 10)

Production

- Balmur Ltd. – executive producer
- Jim Ed Norman – producer
- Ken Friesen – engineer
- Tim McCauley – assistant engineer
- Robert Anderson – art direction, design
- Paul Cade – art direction, design
- Bill Langstroth – photography
- Typsetta, Inc. – typography
