= Anne Murray / Glen Campbell =

Studio album by Glen Campbell & Anne Murray
- Released: November 1971
- Recorded: July, September and October 1971
- Studios: Capitol Studios (Hollywood, California)
- Genre: Country
- Length: 29:52
- Label: Capitol
- Producers: Al De Lory; Brian Ahern

Glen Campbell chronology
The Last Time I Saw Her (1971)	Anne Murray / Glen Campbell (1971)	The Artistry of Glen Campbell (1972)

Anne Murray chronology
Talk It Over in the Morning (1971)	Anne Murray / Glen Campbell (1971)	Annie (1972)

Professional ratings
Review scores
Source	Rating
Allmusic	3/5 stars

Anne Murray / Glen Campbell is an album by American singer Glen Campbell and the sixth studio album by Canadian singer Anne Murray, released in 1971 (see 1971 in music). The album contained both new material, and duet versions of songs each artist had recorded individually (Campbell's "By the Time I Get to Phoenix" and Murray's "Bring Back the Love"), as well as an early version of "You're Easy to Love", which later became a hit for Hank Snow, the standard "Canadian Sunset", and Brotherhood of Man's 1970 hit "United We Stand".

The first single released from the album was a medley of "By The Time I get to Phoenix" (sung by Campbell) and "I Say a Little Prayer" (sung by Murray). The album peaked at No.12 on the Canadian RPM album chart on 18 March 1972.

== Track listing ==
Side 1:

1. "You're Easy To Love" (Dave Burgess) - 2:05
2. "Medley" (3:15)
  1. "I Say a Little Prayer" (Burt Bacharach, Hal David)
  2. "By The Time I Get To Phoenix" (Jimmy Webb)
3. "We All Pull the Load" (Bill Graham) - 3:05
4. "Canadian Sunset" (Eddie Heywood, Norman Gimbel) - 3:00
5. "Bring Back the Love" (Brent Titcomb, Richard Miller) - 2:55

Side 2:

1. "United We Stand" (Tony Hiller, Peter Simons) - 2:42
2. "Love Story (You & Me)" (Randy Newman) - 3:53
3. "Ease Your Pain" (Hoyt Axton) - 3:39
4. "Let Me Be the One" (Ed Penney, Jr., John Domurad) - 2:37
5. "My Ecstasy" (Dallas Frazier) - 2:28

== Personnel ==
- Glen Campbell – vocals, acoustic guitar, electric guitar
- Anne Murray – vocals
- Bill Graham – bass
- Bruce Ahern – arrangements (1–6, 8–10)
- Al De Lory – arrangements (1–6, 8–10)
- Rick Wilkins – brass and string arrangements (3–6, 8)
- Marty Paich – arrangements (7)

== Production ==
- Al Coury – executive producer
- Brian Ahern – producer
- Al De Lory – producer

== Charts ==
Album - Billboard (United States)

Chart	Entry date	Peak position	No. of weeks
Billboard Country Albums	12/11/1971	4	21
Billboard 200	1971	128	8

Singles - Billboard (United States)

Year	Single	Hot Country Singles	Hot 100	Easy Listening
1971	"I Say a Little Prayer / By the Time I Get to Phoenix"	40	81	13
1972	United We Stand	—	—	—
