= Uproar =

Uproar may refer to:

- A brouhaha, a state of social agitation when a minor incident gets out of control
- A protest
- "Uproar" (Anne Murray song), 1975
- "Uproar" (Lil Wayne song), 2018
- HMS Uproar (P31), British Royal Navy U-class submarine
- Uproar (film), a 2023 New Zealand film
