= Starvin' Marvin (disambiguation) =

"Starvin' Marvin" is an episode of South Park.

Starvin' Marvin may also refer to:

- Starvin' Marvin, a South Park character
- Starvin' Marvin (gas station), a chain of gas stations in the United States operated by Speedway LLC
- "Starvin Marvin", a song by Raffi from Adult Entertainment
