= Danny's Song (album) =

1973 studio album by Anne Murray

Studio album / live album by Anne Murray
- Released: April 1973
- Venues: National Arts Centre, Ottawa, Canada - side two
- Genre: Country
- Length: 31:36
- Label: Capitol
- Producer: Brian Ahern

Anne Murray chronology
Annie (1972)	Danny's Song (1973)	Love Song (1974)

Singles from Danny's Song
- 1. "Danny's Song" Released: December 23, 1972; 2. "What About Me" Released: May 1973

Professional ratings
Review scores
Source	Rating
Christgau's Record Guide	C+

Danny's Song is the eighth studio album by Canadian country pop artist Anne Murray, released in 1973 via Capitol Records. It was produced and arranged by Brian Ahern for Happy Sack Productions. Tracks 6–10 were recorded live at the National Arts Centre in Ottawa, Ontario. The album peaked at number 4 on the Billboard Country Albums chart and number 39 on the Billboard Pop Albums chart.

== Track listing ==
No.	Title	Writer(s)	Length
1.	"Danny's Song"	Kenny Loggins	3:06
2.	"Killing Me Softly with His Song"	Charles Fox, Norman Gimbel	3:05
3.	"He Thinks I Still Care"	Dickey Lee, Steve Duffy	3:25
4.	"Let Sunshine Have Its Day"	Robbie MacNeill	2:36
5.	"I'll Be Home"	Randy Newman	2:32
6.	"What About Me"	Scott McKenzie	2:34
7.	"I Know"	Barbara George	3:05
8.	"Ease Your Pain"	Hoyt Axton	3:30
9.	"One Day I Walk"	Bruce Cockburn	2:34
10.	"Put Your Hand in the Hand"	Gene MacLellan	3:03

== Personnel ==
- Anne Murray – lead vocals, backing vocals
- Pat Riccio Jr. – keyboards, backing vocals (6–10)
- Brian Ahern – guitars (1–5)
- Lenny Breau – guitars (6–10)
- Miles Wilkinson – guitars (6–10), backing vocals (6–10)
- Ben Keith – pedal steel guitar (1–5)
- Skip Beckwith – bass, horns 6–10)
- Andy Cree – drums, percussion
- Brent Titcomb – harmonica (1–5)
- Don Thompson – saxophone (6–10), flute (6–10), horns (6–10)
- Rick Wilkins – strings (1–5), horns (6–10)
- Terry Black – backing vocals (6–10)
- Dianne Brooks – backing vocals (6–10)
- Joanne Brooks – backing vocals (6–10)
- Brenda Gordon – backing vocals (6–10)
- Brian Russell – backing vocals (6–10)
- Laurel Ward – backing vocals (6–10)

== Production ==
- Paul White – A&R
- Brian Ahern – producer, arrangements, engineer
- Chris Skene – engineer
- Miles Wilkinson – engineer
- Don Newlands – photography

== Charts ==
=== Weekly charts ===
Chart (1973)	Peak position
US Billboard 200	39
US Top Country Albums (Billboard)	4

=== Year-end charts ===
Chart (1973)	Position
US Top Country Albums (Billboard)	24
