= Golden Oldies =

Golden Oldies may refer to:

- Golden Oldies (album), a 2014 studio album by Focus
- Golden Oldies (TV program), a South Korean TV program
- "Golden Oldies", a 2019 song by Kaiser Chiefs
- "Golden Oldie" (song), a song by Anne Murray

== See also ==
- Oldies, a term for musical genres (e.g.pop music, rock and roll, doo-wop, surf music) from the mid-1950s to the 1980s
