= Let the Sunshine In (disambiguation) =

Let the Sunshine In may refer to the following:

== Albums ==
- Let the Sunshine In (album), 1969 album by Diana Ross and the Supremes, named after the song from the musical Hair
- Let the Sunshine In, 1969 album by Buddy Greco, named after the song from the musical Hair

== Songs ==
- "Let the Sun Shine In", song from the 1967 musical Hair
- "Aquarius/Let the Sunshine In", a 1969 medley of two songs from the musical Hair recorded by The 5th Dimension
- "Open Up Your Heart (And Let the Sunshine In)", 1954 song by Stuart Hamblen

== Film ==
- Let the Sunshine In (film), a 2017 film by director Claire Denis based on A Lover's Discourse: Fragments

== See also ==
- "Let the Sun Shine", a 2010 single by Labrinth
