= What About Me (Anne Murray album) =

Studio album by Anne Murray
- Released: July 1, 1968
- Recorded: December 1967 to Spring 1968
- Studio: Bay Studios (Toronto, Ontario, Canada)
- Genre: Country
- Length: 15:03
- Label: Arc
- Producer: Brian Ahern

Anne Murray chronology
What About Me (1968)	This Way Is My Way (1969)

Professional ratings
Review scores
Source	Rating
AllMusic	3/5 stars

What About Me is the debut studio album by Anne Murray issued in 1968 on Arc Records. Upon its release, the album was only issued in Canada (it would later be issued in the U.S. on the Pickwick label, following Murray's 1970s chart success there).

The album was reissued in Europe on the Astan label under the title Both Sides Now after original title track "What About Me" was dropped from the album. "Both Sides Now" is the well known Joni Mitchell song covered on the album. Other versions of the album kept the title Both Sides Now but include the "What About Me" track.

In 1980, Chevron Records (UK) released an album (#CHVL 1830) with the same title but with a different cover art – tracks 4 and 5 are a medley and this causes confusion but the Chevron issue is complete.

== Track listing ==
1. "What About Me" (Scott McKenzie) – 3:09
2. "Both Sides Now" (Joni Mitchell) – 3:22
3. "It's All Over" (Alan MacRae) – 2:09
4. "Some Birds" (Ken Tobias)
5. "For Baby" (John Denver credited as Deutshendorf) – 4:31 (medley total for tracks 4 & 5)
6. "Paths of Victory" (Brian Ahern) – 1:54
7. "David's Song" (David Wiffen) – 3:10
8. "There Goes My Everything" (Dallas Frazier) – 3:25
9. "Buffalo in the Park" (Ahern, William Hawkins) – 2:52
10. "Last Thing on My Mind" (Tom Paxton) – 2:28 (recorded December 1967)
11. "All the Time" (Mel Tillis, Wayne Walker) – 2:39

== Credits ==
- Anne Murray – vocals
- Bill Gilliland – executive producer
- Brian Ahern – producer
- Harvey Sedlack Associates – album design
- CBC Press & Information, Toronto – photography
- Bill Langstroth – liner notes
