= Robbie's Song for Jesus =

Single by Anne Murray

from the album Annie
- A-side: "You Can't Have a Hand on Me"
- Released: 1972
- Genre: Country
- Length: 2:37
- Label: Capitol Records 3352
- Songwriter(s): Robbie MacNeill
- Producer(s): Brian Ahern

Anne Murray singles chronology
"Cotton Jenny" (1972)	"Robbie's Song for Jesus" (1972)	"Danny's Song" (1972)

"Robbie's Song for Jesus" is a song written by Robbie MacNeill and performed by Anne Murray. The song reached #7 on the Canadian Adult Contemporary chart and #17 on both the Canadian Country chart and the Canadian Pop chart in 1972. The song appeared on her 1972 album, Annie. The song was produced by Brian Ahern.

== Chart performance ==
=== Anne Murray ===
Chart (1972)	Peak position
Canadian RPM Country Tracks	17
Canadian RPM Top Singles	17
Canadian RPM Adult Contemporary	7
