= Talk It Over in the Morning =

1971 studio album by Anne Murray

Studio album by Anne Murray
- Released: September 1971
- Studio: Eastern Sound (Toronto, Ontario)
- Genre: Country
- Length: 27:20
- Label: Capitol
- Producer: Brian Ahern

Anne Murray chronology
Straight, Clean and Simple (1971)	Talk It Over in the Morning (1971)	Anne Murray / Glen Campbell (1971)

Singles from Talk It Over in the Morning
- 1. "Talk It Over in the Morning" Released: August 1971

Talk It Over in the Morning

Studio album by Anne Murray
- Released: 1981
- Label: Music for Pleasure

Talk It Over in the Morning is the fifth studio album by Canadian singer Anne Murray, issued in 1971 on Capitol Records. The album peaked at number 26 on the Billboard Country Albums chart and number 179 on the Billboard Top LP's chart. It was reissued in the UK in 1981 by the Music for Pleasure (MFP) label with different album art but the same track listing. As singles, "Talk it Over in the Morning" and "Cotton Jenny" were both #1 hits in the Canadian country charts. "Let Me Be the One" was released as the second single (Capitol CL15711) from the album in the UK with "Destiny" on the flip. Later in 1972 the single was reissued (CL15734) with "Destiny" as the A side, peaking at No.41 on the chart.

== Track listing ==
No.	Title	Writer(s)	Length
1.	"Talk It Over in the Morning"	Roger Nichols, Paul Williams	2:28
2.	"Most of All"	Buddy Buie, James B. Cobb Jr.	3:15
3.	"Bring Back the Love"	Brent Titcomb	2:15
4.	"Let Me Be the One"	Nichols, Williams	2:32
5.	"Night Owl"	James Taylor	2:40
6.	"Destiny"	José Feliciano	2:49
7.	"Please Smile"	Shirley Eikhard	1:58
8.	"I Know"	Barbara George	3:12
9.	"You've Got a Friend"	Carole King	3:05
10.	"Cotton Jenny"	Gordon Lightfoot	2:57

- Timings from the MFP album.

== Personnel ==
- Anne Murray – vocals
- Bill Speer – musician
- Brian Ahern – musician, arrangements
- Buddy Cage – musician
- Tommy Graham – musician
- Skip Beckwith – musician
- Don Thompson – musician
- Andy Cree – musician
- Rick Wilkins – brass, reeds, strings
- Tommy Ambrose – backing vocals
- Colina Phillips – backing vocals
- Patty Van Evera – backing vocals

=== Production ===
- Paul White – executive producer
- Brian Ahern – producer, engineer
- Ian Goggin – engineer
- Chris Skene – engineer

== Awards ==
Talk it Over in the Morning won the 1972 Juno Award for Best Produced MOR Album.
