= There's a Hippo in My Tub =

Studio album by Anne Murray
- Released: 1977
- Studios: Sounds Interchange and Toronto Sound (Toronto, Canada)
- Genres: Country, children's music
- Length: 34:58
- Label: Capitol/EMI
- Producer: Pat Riccio Jr.

Anne Murray chronology
Keeping In Touch (1976)	There's a Hippo in My Tub (1977)	Let's Keep It That Way (1978)

Alternative Cover
- 1979 Sesame Street Records rerelease

There's a Hippo in My Tub, rereleased as Anne Murray Sings for the Sesame Street Generation is a 1977 children's album and the thirteenth studio album by Anne Murray. Although the album did not make any of the major charts in the US or Canada, it was certified Platinum in Canada. The album was initially reissued in 1979 by Sesame Street Records retitled Anne Murray Sings for the Sesame Street Generation. It was again reissued in 2001 in CD format by EMI Music Canada, including three extra songs that were not on the original album. It was produced by Pat Riccio Jr.

As Anne Murray Sings for the Sesame Street Generation, the album was nominated for the 1980 Grammy Awards in the Best Children's Album category, where it was up against two other Sesame Street-branded albums and the soundtrack of The Muppet Movie, which won. The synthesizer line from "Teddy Bears' Picnic" was sampled by the American hip hop group Ugly Duckling as part of the song "Down the Road." The song "Hey, Daddy" inspired an animated series, Hippo Tub Co., which aired on CBC Television in 2001; it also appeared as the show's theme song, which Murray performed.

== Track listing (1977) ==
1. "Hey, Daddy" (Bob Ruzicka) - 2:05
2. "Stars are the Windows of Heaven" (Jimmy Steiger, Tommie Malie) - 3:14
3. "Animal Crackers" (Irving Caesar, Ted Koehler) - 2:30
4. "Hi-Lili, Hi-Lo" (Bronisław Kaper, Helen Deutsch) - 2:05
5. "Why, Oh, Why (Why, Why, Why)" (Woody Guthrie) - 2:20
6. "Teddy Bears' Picnic" (Jimmy Kennedy, John Walter Bratton) - 2:40
7. "Inchworm" (Frank Loesser) - 2:46
8. "You Are My Sunshine/Open Up Your Heart" (Stuart Hamblen, Charles Mitchell) - 2:45
9. "Sleepytime" (John Renton) - 2:46
10. "Lullaby Medley: Hush Little Baby/Sleep Child/Brahms Lullaby" (Traditional, Robbie MacNeill) - 3:16

== Track listing (2001 reissue) ==
- Track times same as original release with the additions of Tracks #7, #10 and #11.
1. "Hey, Daddy" (Bob Ruzicka)
2. "Stars Are the Windows of Heaven" (Jimmy Steiger, Tommie Malie)
3. "Animal Crackers" (Irving Caesar, Ted Koehler)
4. "Hi-Lili, Hi-Lo" (Bronisław Kaper, Helen Deutsch)
5. "Why, Oh, Why (Why, Why, Why)" (Woody Guthrie)
6. "Teddy Bears' Picnic" (Jimmy Kennedy, John Walter Bratton)
7. "Sing High, Sing Low" (Brent Titcomb) - 2:32
8. "Inchworm" (Frank Loesser)
9. "You Are My Sunshine/Open Up Your Heart" (Stuart Hamblen, Charles Mitchell)
10. "I Can See Clearly Now" (Johnny Nash) - 3:05
11. "What a Wonderful World" (Robert Thiele Jr., George David Weiss) - 2:22
12. "Sleepytime" (John Renton)
13. "Lullaby Medley: Hush Little Baby/Sleep Child/Brahms Lullaby" (Traditional, Robbie MacNeill)

== Chart performance ==
Chart (1978/81)	Peak position
Canadian RPM Country Albums	55
Australia (Kent Music Report)	44

== Personnel ==
- Anne Murray – lead vocals, backing vocals, arrangements
- John Mills-Cockell – keyboards
- Pat Riccio Jr. – keyboards, backing vocals, arrangements
- Bob Mann – guitars
- Aidan Mason – guitars, backing vocals
- Miles Wilkinson – guitars
- Bob Lucier – steel guitar
- Peter Cardinali – bass
- Paul Beedham – drums
- Sid Beckwith – flute
- Rick Wilkins – string arrangements
- Shanna Dryburgh – backing vocals
- Christine MacIntosh – backing vocals
- Kathleen Langstroth – backing vocals
- Lisa Wonnacott – backing vocals

=== Production ===
- Balmur Ltd. – executive producer
- Pat Riccio Jr. – producer
- Anne Murray – associate producer
- Chris Skene – engineer
- Robert Anderson – cover design
- Paul Cade – cover design
- Raul Vega – photography
- Typsetta Inc. – typography
