= Annie (Anne Murray album) =

Studio album by Anne Murray
- Released: April 1972
- Studio: Eastern Sound (Toronto, Ontario)
- Genre: Country
- Length: 28:34
- Label: Capitol
- Producer: Brian Ahern

Anne Murray chronology
Anne Murray / Glen Campbell (1971)	Annie (1972)	Danny's Song (1973)

Singles from Annie
- 1. "Robbie's Song for Jesus" Released: 1972

Professional ratings
Review scores
Source	Rating
Christgau's Record Guide	B

Annie is the seventh studio album by Anne Murray issued in 1972 on Capitol Records. It peaked at number 14 on the Billboard Country Albums chart and number 143 on the Billboard Pop Albums chart. The album title was inspired by her pet name. It won the Best Produced MOR Album for Brian Ahern who also arranged the album. The front cover was credited to Dean Torrence of Jan & Dean fame.

== Track listing ==
1. "Robbie's Song for Jesus" (Robbie MacNeill) – 2:37
2. "Falling Into Rhyme" (Maribeth Solomon) – 3:02
3. "I Like Your Music" (Sonny Curtis) – 2:35
4. "Everything Has Got to Be Free" (Bodie Chandler) – 2:39
5. "Drown Me" (Peter Cornell) – 2:50
6. "You Can't Have a Hand on Me" (Billy Gale) – 3:05
7. "You Made My Life a Song" (Sonny Curtis) – 2:17
8. "You Can't Go Back" (Paul Grady) – 2:23
9. "Beautiful" (Carole King) – 3:03
10. "Everything's Been Changed" (Paul Anka) – 4:03

== Personnel ==
- Anne Murray – vocals
- Bill Speer – musician
- Brian Ahern – musician
- Brent Titcomb – musician
- Skip Beckwith – musician
- Don Thompson – musician
- Andy Cree – musician

Production and technical

- Brian Ahern – producer, arrangements, engineer
- Ian Goggin – engineer
- Chris Skene – engineer
- Miles Wilkinson – engineer
- Dean Torrence – front cover
- Black Creek Pioneer Village – back cover photography
