= Highly Prized Possession =

Studio album by Anne Murray
- Released: November 1974
- Studios: Eastern Sound (Toronto, Ontario, Canada)
- Genre: Country
- Length: 33:19
- Label: Capitol
- Producer: Brian Ahern

Anne Murray chronology
Anne Murray Country (1974)	Highly Prized Possession (1974)	Together (1975)

Singles from Highly Prized Possession
- 1. "Uproar" Released: February 15, 1975

Professional ratings
Review scores
Source	Rating
Christgau's Record Guide	B+

Highly Prized Possession is the tenth studio album by Canadian country pop artist Anne Murray, released in November 1974. In the U.S., the album peaked at number 8 on the country album charts and number 70 on the pop albums chart; in Canada, the album reached number 26. Murray's cover of the Beatles' "Day Tripper" was released as a single (following her chart success the year before on another Beatles cover "You Won't See Me"), and it reached # 59 on the Hot 100, but failed to hit the U.S. Country chart.

== Track listing ==
No.	Title	Writer(s)	Length
1.	"Dream Lover"	Bobby Darin	3:05
2.	"Slow Fall"	Jack Lee	4:25
3.	"Saved by the Grace of Your Love"	David Palmer, William Smith	3:25
4.	"Lullaby"	Robbie MacNeill	2:52
5.	"When We Both Had the Time to Love"	Alex Harvey	3:50
6.	"Day Tripper"	John Lennon, Paul McCartney	2:35
7.	"Lift Your Hearts to the Sun"	Brent Titcomb	3:21
8.	"Uproar"	Paul Grady	2:48
9.	"Highly Prized Possession"	Brian Russell, David Palmer	3:48
10.	"Please Don't Sell Nova Scotia"	Peter Pringle	2:43

== Personnel ==
- Anne Murray – vocals, supporting vocals (1–7, 9, 10)
- Pat Riccio Jr. – pianos (1, 2), acoustic piano (3, 5, 6, 8–10), organ (3, 5, 7, 9, 10)
- Brian Ahern – acoustic guitar (1–3, 5, 6, 9), percussion (3, 6, 7, 9), guitars (4, 7, 10), bass (4), rhythm guitars (8), ukulele (8), harmonica (8)
- Amos Garrett – guitars (1–3, 6, 9)
- Ben Keith – steel guitar (2, 5, 7, 9), slide guitar (8)
- Rick Kunha – guitars (4)
- Robert Cardwell – guitars (5, 10)
- Robbie MacNeill – "ragtime" guitar (8), supporting vocals (8)
- Skip Beckwith – basses (1, 3), bass (2, 5–10)
- Pentti Glan – drums (1–3, 6, 9, 10), percussion (1)
- Andy Cree – drums (5, 7, 8)
- Don Thompson – saxophones (1, 6)
- Milan Kymlicka – horns (1), strings (1–3)
- Rick Wilkins – horns (5), strings (5, 7, 9, 10), saxophone arrangements (6)
- Dianne Brooks – supporting vocals (1–7, 9, 10)
- Laurel Ward – supporting vocals (1–7, 9, 10)
- Bonnie Beckwith – supporting vocals (8)

=== Production ===
- Paul White – executive producer
- Brian Ahern – producer, arrangements, engineer
- Gregory "Gabby" Garcia – engineer
- Peter Mann – engineer
- Chris Skene – engineer
- Stuart Taylor – engineer
- Bob Hanks – administrator
- Balmur Ltd. – art direction, design
- Paul Cade – art direction, design
- Ed Harris – photography
- Gord Marci – photography
- Typsettra Ltd. – typography

== Chart performance ==
Chart (1975)	Peak position
Canadian RPM Country Albums	26
Australia (Kent Music Report)	96

== Production ==
- Producer: Brian Ahern for Happy Sack Productions Ltd.
- Executive Producer: Paul White
- Arranger: Brian Ahern
