= Uproar (Anne Murray song) =

Single by Anne Murray

from the album Highly Prized Possession
- B-side: "Lift Your Heart to the Sun"
- Released: February 15, 1975
- Genre: Country
- Length: 2:48
- Label: Capitol 4025
- Songwriter(s): Paul Grady
- Producer(s): Brian Ahern

Anne Murray singles chronology
| "Day Tripper" (1974) | "Uproar" (1975) | "A Stranger in My Place (Re-release)" (1975) |

"Uproar" is a song written by Paul Grady, and recorded by Canadian singer Anne Murray. The song reached #18 on the Canadian Adult Contemporary chart in 1975. The song appeared on her 1974 album, Highly Prized Possession. The song was produced by Brian Ahern.

== Chart performance ==
=== Anne Murray ===
| Chart (1975) | Peak position |
|---|---|
| Canadian RPM Country Tracks | 27 |
| Canadian RPM Top Singles | 45 |
| Canadian RPM Adult Contemporary | 18 |
| U.S. Country | 28 |
