= Dawn Langstroth =

Canadian singer, songwriter and painter

Background information
- Birth name: Dawn Joanne Langstroth
- Born: April 16, 1979 (age 46) York, Ontario, Canada
- Origin: Thornhill, Ontario, Canada
- Genres: Rock, pop rock
- Occupation(s): Singer, songwriter, painter
- Years active: 1999–present
- Website: www.dawnlangstroth.com

Dawn Joanne Langstroth (born April 16, 1979) is a Canadian singer, songwriter and painter. Raised in Toronto, she has released two EPs, self-titled Dawn Langstroth and No Mercy, and released her debut album Highwire in 2009. Langstroth is the daughter of singer Anne Murray and former CBC television producer Bill Langstroth (Singalong Jubilee).

== Music ==
Langstroth has worked with Grammy Award winning producers Phil Ramone, George Massenburg, and Ed Cherney, and notable acts such as Jann Arden, The Rankin Family, Shelby Lynne and John McDermott.

== Painting ==
Langstroth is known for a playful, semi-cubist illustration style and the inclusion of family pets in her paintings.

== Discography ==
=== Albums ===
Year	Album
2009	Highwire

=== EPs ===
(Extended Play record)

Year	EP
2007	Dawn Langstroth
2008	No Mercy

=== Singles ===
Year	Single	CAN AC	Album
1999	"Let There Be Love" (with Anne Murray)	23	What a Wonderful World (Anne Murray album)
2009	"Dark and Twisted"		Highwire
2013	"Here Come the Snow"		Released through Internet Download

=== Music videos ===
Year	Video	Director
1999	"Let There Be Love" (with Anne Murray)	Steven Goldmann
2014	"Here Comes the Snow"	Spencer Jones

=== Soundtracks ===
Year	Movie	Song title	Word and music by
2009	"Dark Moon Rising"	"Something Brave"	Geoff Gibbons/Dawn Langstroth

== Awards and nominations ==
Year	Association	Category	Result
2000	Canadian Country Music Association	Vocal/Instrumental Collaboration of the Year – "Let There Be Love"	Nominated

== Video ==
- "Dark and Twisted" 2009
- "Mother's Child" – Live at Blackbird, Studio C, July 2007
