= Together (Anne Murray album) =

Studio album by Anne Murray
- Released: November 1975
- Genre: Country
- Length: 31:35
- Label: Capitol/EMI
- Producer: Tom Catalano

Anne Murray chronology
Highly Prized Possession (1974)	Together (1975)	Keeping in Touch (1976)

Professional ratings
Review scores
Source	Rating
AllMusic	2/5 stars
Christgau's Record Guide	C

Together is the eleventh studio album by Anne Murray, released in November 1975. The album reached number 15 on the U.S. country album charts and #142 on the pop albums charts. It was one of Murray's few albums during this time period that did not chart in Canada. Two singles were released from the album: "The Call" (also sometimes referred to as "Long Distance Call"), which reached #19 and #6 on the U.S. country and A/C singles charts respectively, and "Sunday Sunrise", which reached #49 on the country singles charts, and #13 on the A/C singles charts. "The Call" was a rerecording of a song, which Murray had originally included on her Honey, Wheat and Laughter album in 1970. This album also has the distinction of having the great Dusty Springfield doing backup vocals.

== Track listing ==
1. "If It's All Right With You" (Gene MacLellan) - 3:08
2. "Sunday Sunrise" (Mark James) - 3:16
3. "Out On The Road Again" (Steve Eaton) - 4:01
4. "Part-Time Love" (David Gates) - 2:29
5. "The Call" (Gene MacLellan) - 2:34
6. "Everything Old Is New Again" (Peter Allen, Carole Bayer Sager) - 2:20
7. "Lady Bug" (James Stein) - 4:10
8. "Player In The Band" (Brenda Russell, Brian Gordon Russell) - 4:03
9. "Blue Finger Lou" (Alan O'Day) - 2:39
10. "Together" (Buddy G. De Sylva, Lew Brown, Ray Henderson) - 2:51

== Personnel ==
- Anne Murray – lead vocals, backing vocals
- Michael Omartian – keyboards
- Tom Hensley – keyboards
- Larry Muhoberac – keyboards
- Larry Carlton – guitars
- Al Casey – guitars
- David Bennett Cohen – guitars
- Dean Parks – guitars
- Lee Ritenour – guitars
- Tommy Tedesco – guitars
- Wilton Felder – bass
- Reinie Press – bass
- Hal Blaine – drums
- Jim Gordon – drums
- John Guerin – drums
- Gene Estes – percussion
- Victor Feldman – percussion
- Gayle Levant – harp
- Dianne Brooks – backing vocals
- Dusty Springfield – backing vocals
- Bruce Murray – lead vocals (8)

Orchestra

- Michael Omartian – arrangements and conductor (1, 2, 8, 9)
- Lee Holdridge – arrangements and conductor (3, 5, 7)
- Artie Butler – arrangements and conductor (4, 6, 10)
- Sid Sharp – concertmaster
- Plas Johnson, Johnny Rotella, Ernie Watts, George Bohanon, Lew McCreary, Paul Hubinon, Steve Madaio and Tony Terran – horns
- Gene Cipriano, Louise Di Tullio and Terry Herrington – woodwinds
- Murray Adler, Myer Bello, Arnold Belnick, Byron Berline, Samuel Boghossian, David Campbell, Assa Drori, Jesse Ehrlich, Henry Ferber, Elliott Fisher, Ronald Folsom, James Getzoff, Anne Goodman, Debbie Grossman, Allan Harshman, Harry Hyams, Raymond Kelley, Jerome Kessler, Bernard Kundell, William Kurasch, Joy Lyle, Peter Mercurio, Milton E. Nadel, Jay Rosen, Nathan Ross, Harry Shlutz, Haim Shtrum, Polly Sweeney, Tibor Zelig – strings

== Production ==
- Balmur Ltd. and Alive Enterprises, Inc. – executive producers
- Tom Catalano – producer
- Armin Steiner – engineer
- Linda Tyler – second engineer
- The Mastering Lab (Hollywood, California) – mastering location
- Rod Dyer – design
- Terry O'Neill – photography
