= What a Wonderful World (Anne Murray album) =

Studio album by Anne Murray
- Released: October 19, 1999
- Studio: Metalworks Studios (Mississauga, Ontario, Canada)
- Genres: Christian, country
- Length: 1:37:25
- Label: StraightWay/EMI Canada
- Producers: Anne Murray Tommy West

Anne Murray chronology
An Intimate Evening with Anne Murray (1997)	What a Wonderful World (1999)	What a Wonderful Christmas (2001)

Professional ratings
Review scores
Source	Rating
Allmusic	3/5 stars

What a Wonderful World is the twenty-ninth studio album by Canadian artist Anne Murray. It was released by StraightWay Records on EMI Music Canada's behalf in October 1999. The album hit No. 1 on the Billboard Christian Albums chart, her only No. 1 on any American album chart. It was certified Platinum by the RIAA, her highest selling album since 1981's Christmas Wishes. The album had sold 2 million copies worldwide by November 2007.

== Track listing ==
Disc 1
No.	Title	Writer(s)	Length
1.	"Lord, I Hope This Day Is Good"	David Hanner	3:24
2.	"Amazing Grace"	John Newton	3:36
3.	"Lean on Me"	Bill Withers	3:34
4.	"Just a Closer Walk With Thee/Take My Hand Lord Jesus"	Traditional	4:18
5.	"Let It Be"	John Lennon, Paul McCartney	3:29
6.	"Softly and Tenderly"	Red Bailey, Jim Howell, Traditional	4:06
7.	"Let There Be Love"	Steven MacKinnon, Lionel Rand, Amy Sky	3:38
8.	"I Believe in You"	Bob Dylan	4:45
9.	"It Is No Secret"	Stuart Hamblen	3:37
10.	"What a Wonderful World"	George Douglas, George David Weiss	2:22
11.	"Peace in the Valley"	Thomas A. Dorsey	3:25
12.	"The Other Side"	Joie Scott, Richard Wold	4:09
13.	"The Old Rugged Cross"	George Bennard, Traditional	4:10
Total length:			48:33

Disc 2
No.	Title	Writer(s)	Length
1.	"I Can See Clearly Now"	Johnny Nash	3:05
2.	"In the Garden"	C. Austin Miles	4:23
3.	"You've Got a Friend"	Carole King	4:37
4.	"Whispering Hope"	Traditional	4:30
5.	"Put a Little Love in Your Heart"	Jackie DeShannon, Jimmy Holiday, Randy Myers	2:51
6.	"How Great Thou Art"	Carl Boberg, Stuart K. Hine	3:39
7.	"Song of Bernadette"	Leonard Cohen, Bill Elliott, Jennifer Warnes	3:42
8.	"Elijah"	Gene MacLellan	3:45
9.	"Bridge over Troubled Water"	Paul Simon	4:31
10.	"Bedside of a Neighbor"
11.	"Jacob's Ladder"	Traditional	4:17
12.	"Nearer, My God, to Thee"	Sarah Fuller Flower Adams	3:35
13.	"Lord's Prayer"	Traditional	2:14
Total length:			48:52

== Personnel ==
Musicians

- Anne Murray – vocals, backing vocals
- Doug Riley – acoustic piano, organ
- Steve Sexton – keyboards, organ
- Tommy West – keyboards, organ, backing vocals, vocals (4)
- Mike "Pepe" Francis – acoustic guitar, electric guitar, mandolin
- Aidan Mason – acoustic guitar, electric guitar, classical guitar, slide guitar
- Peter Bleakney – bass, fretless bass
- Peter Cardinali – bass
- Gary Craig – drums, percussion
- Barry Keane – drums, percussion
- Brian Barlow – percussion, marimba, vibraphone
- Vern Dorge – alto saxophone, soprano saxophone
- Richard Armin – cello
- Steve Dann – viola
- Adele Armin – violin
- Marie Berard – violin
- Dawn Cumberbatch – backing vocals
- Rique Franks – backing vocals
- Tuku Matthews – backing vocals
- Amy Sky – backing vocals
- Dawn Langstroth – vocals (7), backing vocals (12, 15, 21)
- Colina Phillips – additional vocals (24)
- Jackie Richardson – additional vocals (24)
- Sharon Lee Williams – additional vocals (24)
- Vivienne Williams – additional vocals (24)

Music arrangements

- Peter Cardinali – string arrangements and conductor (1–3, 16, 26)
- Steve Sexton – string arrangements and conductor (4, 5, 10, 11, 14)
- Doug Riley – string arrangements and conductor (6, 8, 12, 13, 19, 22, 25)
- Colina Phillips – vocal arrangements (24)

== Production ==
- Anne Murray – producer
- Tommy West – producer
- L. Stu Young – recording, mixing
- Joel Kazmi – assistant engineer
- Nick Blagona – mastering
- Raine Munro – production assistant
- Michael Ragogna – production assistant
- Darlene Sawyer – production assistant
- Andrew Eccles – cover photography
- Kathleen Finlay – inside photography
- Bruce Allen – management
- Balmur Ltd. – business management

== Charts ==
=== Weekly charts ===
Chart (1999–2000)	Peak position
Canadian Country Albums (RPM)	6
US Billboard 200	38
US Top Christian Albums (Billboard)	1
US Top Country Albums (Billboard)	4

=== Year-end charts ===
Chart (2000)	Position
US Top Country Albums (Billboard)	23
Chart (2001)	Position
Canadian Country Albums (Nielsen SoundScan)	51
US Top Country Albums (Billboard)	31
Chart (2002)	Position
Canadian Country Albums (Nielsen SoundScan)	87
