= Open Up Your Heart (And Let the Sunshine In) =

Song written by Stuart Hamblen

"Open Up Your Heart (And Let the Sunshine In)" (sometimes seen as "Open Up Your Heart") is a popular song written by Stuart Hamblen and first published in 1954. The original version was recorded by the Cowboy Church Sunday School.

Another widely known US recording was released shortly after by the McGuire Sisters, and the United Kingdom saw a version by Joan Regan and her son Rusty.

== Composition ==
When the Cowboy Church Sunday School version is played at normal released speed, the vocals sound unnaturally high. When played at 33⅓ rpm instead of 45 rpm the vocals sound more natural. The song was recorded at 33⅓ rpm speed, by Stuart Hamblen's two daughters (19 & 18 years old at the time of this recording), so that when played at 45 rpm the song sounds as if it is being sung by children.

The melody of the chorus section is identical for its first two measures to the published version of "Aloha Oe" by Princess Lili`uokalani (1878), and "There's Music in the Air" by George F. Root (1854), and all three share the same chord progression IV-I-V-I.

== Release ==
In March 1955, the song reached number 3 on The Billboard Best Selling Sheet Music chart, where it tied with "Mr. Sandman". In April, "Open Up Your Heart" reached number 8 on the magazine's Best Sellers in Stores chart. In June, The Billboard listed the song on its England's Top Twenty chart.

== Pebbles and Bamm-Bamm version ==
"Open Up Your Heart"

Single by Pebbles and Bamm-Bamm Of The Flintstones
- B-side: "The Lord is Counting on You"
- Released: 1965
- Length: 2:25
- Label: Hanna-Barbera

The song was performed by Pebbles and Bamm-Bamm on the premiere episode of the sixth season of The Flintstones, "No Biz Like Show Biz", which aired on September 17, 1965. The clip of them performing this song was sometimes played in the closing credits of the show's sixth and final season. Although Pebbles and Bamm Bamm went on to form a rock band as teenagers in the 1970s, they never approached the classic heights of their early childhood tune. The Flintstones version of the song was not stripped of its religious lyrics for inclusion in the show. One change to the lyrics was the substitution of "little kid" for "little girl". Another was "mommies never lose, and daddies never win" for "smilers never lose, and frowners never win." Original vocals were provided by Rebecca Page (as Pebbles) and her mother Ricky Page (as Bamm-Bamm), who later became "The Bermudas" and then "The Majorettes". They were managed by George Motola, who was Ricky's husband.

=== Release and reception ===
Hanna-Barbera's record division released Pebbles and Bamm Bamm's rendition of the song as a single. Hanna-Barbera also prepared a special promotional film of the song for TV stations using animation from the episode, albeit on a black background, which Billboard reported "enab[les] the originating show to superimpose dancers behind the singers". The clip attracted interest from national television shows, including Hullabaloo and ABC programs Shindig! and The Jimmy Dean Show.

Record World gave the single four stars and called it a "cutesy rendition of the advice song".

== Other versions ==
- Anne Murray included the song (in a medley with "You Are My Sunshine") on her 1977 album There's a Hippo in My Tub.
- Frente! recorded a cover of the song for inclusion on the 1995 tribute album Saturday Morning: Cartoons’ Greatest Hits, produced by Ralph Sall for MCA Records, in tribute to the Flintstones version.
- The Clumsy Lovers included a cover of the song on their 2001 album "Still Clumsy After All These Years".

== In popular culture ==
The 1969 number 1 hit song "Aquarius/Let the Sunshine In" by The 5th Dimension contains the refrain "Let the Sunshine In" and backing vocals that include the phrase "Open Up Your Heart".

The version sung by the Cowboy Church Sunday School was featured twice in the John Waters film A Dirty Shame. The song was first used as an angelic juxtaposition to the intolerant concept of NIMBY. It was later used satirically in a scene depicting the religious aspects of 12-step programs. "The Hamblens" sung the version featured in the André Øvredal horror film The Autopsy of Jane Doe.
