= Keeping in Touch =

Studio album by Anne Murray
- Released: September 1976
- Genre: Country
- Length: 32:36
- Label: Capitol
- Producer: Tom Catalano

Anne Murray chronology
Together (1975)	Keeping in Touch (1976)	There's a Hippo in My Tub (1977)

Professional ratings
Review scores
Source	Rating
Allmusic	4/5 stars

Keeping in Touch is the twelfth studio album by Canadian country pop artist Anne Murray, released in 1976. In the U.S., the album peaked at number 26 on the country album charts and number 96 on the pop albums chart, and in Canada, the album peaked at number 64 on the RPM album chart on 10 December 1976.

== Track listing ==
No.	Title	Writer(s)	Length
1.	"Things"	Bobby Darin	2:46
2.	"Caress Me Pretty Music"	Alan O'Day	3:12
3.	"Dancin' All Night Long"	Maribeth Solomon	4:04
4.	"Sweet Music Man"	Kenny Rogers	3:06
5.	"Sunday School to Broadway"	Danny Hice, Ruby Hice	3:41
6.	"Shine"	Lew Brown, Ford Dabney	2:32
7.	"Lay Me Down (Roll Me Out To Sea)"	Larry Weiss	3:59
8.	"Golden Oldie"	Brian Russell, Brenda Russell	3:15
9.	"A Million More"	Robbie MacNeill	3:11
10.	"Carolina Sun"	Colleen Peterson	2:50
