= Cotton Jenny =

Song by Gordon Lightfoot

"Cotton Jenny" is a song written and recorded by Gordon Lightfoot for his 1971 album Summer Side of Life. The song was later released as a single by Canadian country-pop artist Anne Murray.

== Anne Murray version ==
"Cotton Jenny"

Single by Anne Murray

from the album Talk It Over in the Morning
- B-side: "Destiny"
- Released: January 1972
- Genre: Country pop
- Length: 2:59
- Label: Capitol
- Songwriter: Gordon Lightfoot
- Producer: Brian Ahern

Anne Murray singles chronology
"I Say a Little Prayer/By the Time I Get to Phoenix" (1971)	"Cotton Jenny" (1972)	"Robbie's Song for Jesus" (1972)

Murray's version was released in January 1972 as the first single from her album Talk It Over in the Morning. It peaked at number 1 on the RPM Country Tracks chart. It also reached number 11 on the Billboard Hot Country Singles chart in the United States. The song also appears on Murray's 2007 album Anne Murray Duets: Friends & Legends, performed as a duet with Olivia Newton-John.

Murray's version omits a verse (beginning with "In the hot, sickly south...") from Lightfoot's original lyric. In later years, Lightfoot decided to omit the same lyric when he sang the song at live concerts.

== Chart performance ==
Chart (1972)	Peak position
Canadian RPM Country Tracks	1
Canadian RPM Top Singles	1
Canadian RPM Adult Contemporary	1
US Hot Country Songs (Billboard)	11
US Billboard Hot 100	71
U.S. Billboard Easy Listening	32
