= Adult Entertainment (album) =

Studio album by Raffi
- Released: October 4, 1977
- Recorded: August 1977
- Genre: Folk, folk rock
- Length: 40:44
- Label: Troubadour
- Producer: Don Potter

Raffi chronology
Singable Songs for the Very Young (1976)	Adult Entertainment (1977)	More Singable Songs (1977)

Adult Entertainment is Raffi's third LP album for his Troubadour label, released in 1977. This is the second of two records Raffi made with adult listeners in mind (the first being 1975's Good Luck Boy). Apart from several self-penned songs, Raffi also covers songs from Jesse Winchester ("Yankee Lady") and fellow Canadian folk artist Stan Rogers ("Forty-Five Years"). This album was later released as "Lovelight" (1980). It is currently not available in CD format.

== Track listing ==
All tracks are written by Raffi, unless otherwise noted.

No.	Title	Length
1.	"Forty-Five Years" (Stan Rogers)	3:58
2.	"Little Kristin January 28"	5:23
3.	"Out in the Yard"	2:39
4.	"Wish I Were A Child Again"	3:52
5.	"Wind Blows Over The Bay" (D'Arcy Wickham)	3:40
6.	"Yankee Lady" (Jesse Winchester)	4:26
7.	"Starvin Marvin"	5:30
8.	"Undecided" (Sid Robin, Charles Shavers)	2:21
9.	"Evangeline" (Robbie MacNeill)	2:40
10.	"Lovelight"	6:03
Total length:		40:44

== Personnel ==
Adapted from LP liner notes.

- Raffi – vocals, acoustic guitar, jacket design
- Don Potter – electric guitar, kalimba, vocals, acoustic guitar (4, 8), producer
- Ed Roth – piano, electric piano, synthesizer, accordion, vocals
- Bob Doidge – bass
- Bill Cymbala – drums, percussion
- Ben Mink – violin, mandolin
- Chris Whiteley – harmonica
- Garnet Rogers – vocals (1, 3)
- Jude Johnson – vocals (1, 3)
- Carla Jensen – vocals (5–7)
- Judy Donnelly – vocals (5–7)
- Bob Lanois – recording engineer
- Linda Leitch – photography
- Doug Powers – jacket design
- Marla Freedman – jacket design
