= Danny's Song =

1972 single by Loggins and Messina

Song by Loggins and Messina

from the album Sittin' In
- Released: November 1971
- Recorded: 1971
- Genre: Folk rock; country folk
- Length: 4:16
- Label: Columbia
- Songwriter: Kenny Loggins
- Producer: Jim Messina

"Danny's Song" is a song written by American singer-songwriter Kenny Loggins, as a gift for his brother Danny for the birth of his son, Colin. It first appeared on an album by Gator Creek and a year later on the album Sittin' In, the debut album by Loggins and Messina. The song is well remembered for both the Loggins and Messina original, as well as for Anne Murray's 1972 top-ten-charting cover.

== Loggins and Messina recording ==
In 1971, Loggins and Jim Messina released Sittin' In and, although the album yielded no Top 40 radio hits, "Danny's Song" received a significant amount of radio airplay. Loggins wrote the song for his brother, Danny Loggins, in 1966 as a senior in high school, when Danny became the father of a boy named Colin – his first son.

"Danny's Song" was included as the B-side of one of their early single releases, "Nobody But You" (U.S. No. 86, 1972). Loggins and Messina would achieve chart success in 1973 with their song "Your Mama Don't Dance", but their version of "Danny's Song" remains one of their best-known songs through the frequent airplay it received on rock and adult contemporary radio stations.

== Personnel ==
- Kenny Loggins – lead vocals, classical acoustic guitar
- Jim Messina – harmony vocals, acoustic guitar
- Al Garth – violin
- Larry Sims – bass, backing vocals
- Merel Bregante – percussion(?)
- Michael Omartian – piano
- Milt Holland – percussion

== Anne Murray version ==
"Danny's Song"

Single by Anne Murray

from the album Danny's Song
- B-side: "Drown Me"
- Released: December 23, 1972
- Genre: Country
- Length: 3:03
- Label: Capitol
- Songwriter: Kenny Loggins
- Producer: Brian Ahern

Anne Murray singles chronology
"Robbie's Song for Jesus" (1972)	"Danny's Song" (1972)	"What About Me" (1973)

Canadian country-pop music singer Anne Murray was a fan of the original recording and recorded a cover version in 1972. Her version of the song omits two of the lyric verses and is in a different key than the original version by Loggins & Messina. Included on her album of the same name, Murray's version of "Danny's Song" was a hit, reaching the Top 10 on three major Billboard music charts in early 1973. On the pop chart, the song reached number seven (returning Murray to that chart's top ten for the first time since 1970's "Snowbird"); on the country chart, it peaked at number ten; and on the easy listening chart, it spent two weeks at number one in March of that year. Murray's version also earned her a Grammy Award nomination in the category Best Female Pop Vocal performance at the Grammy Awards of 1974, losing out to "Killing Me Softly with His Song" by Roberta Flack. Murray stated that she loved the original version, but the song took on a deeper meaning for her after the birth of her first child a few years later. In an interview, she stated that "Whenever I was singing that song, it was very meaningful."

Murray covered the song a second time on her 2007 album Duets: Friends & Legends as a duet with Martina McBride.

== Chart performance ==
=== Weekly charts ===
Chart (1972–1973)	Peak position
Canadian RPM Top Singles	1
Canadian RPM Country Tracks	1
Canadian RPM Adult Contemporary Tracks	1
US Billboard Hot 100	7
US Hot Country Songs (Billboard)	10
US Billboard Easy Listening	1
US Cash Box Top 100	6

=== Year-end charts ===
Chart (1973)	Rank
Canada RPM Top Singles	14
US Billboard Hot 100	37
US Hot Country Songs (Billboard)	45
US Cash Box	25

== Other covers ==
- The song was covered by punk rock band Me First and the Gimme Gimmes on their album Have a Ball. This cover is played over the closing credits of the pilot episode of the TV show Raising Hope.
- The song was covered by Tift Merritt on the 2010 album See You on the Moon.
- The song was covered by Tim and Nicki Bluhm by their band Nicki Bluhm & The Gramblers on their 2008 album, Toby's Song.
- The song was covered by Canadian jazz artist Elizabeth Shepherd on her 2010 album Heavy Falls The Night.
- The song was covered by Matthew Morrison and Jayma Mays during the fifth season of the television show Glee.
- The song was performed by actress Martha Plimpton (as Virginia Chance) in the pilot episode of the show Raising Hope as a lullaby to her granddaughter. This touching moment became a theme for the program, which was revisited in season four, in the series finale, when Loggins himself appeared to sing it at Virginia's wedding.
- In 2010, Beccy Cole recorded a version for her album, Preloved.
- The song was performed by The Swon Brothers twice on season 4 of The Voice (U.S.). Their version charted on the Billboard Hot 100 (#66), Canadian Hot 100 (#53), and Hot Country Songs (#16).
- The Murray version of the song was sampled by Red Hot Chili Peppers guitarist and producer John Frusciante & rap group Black Knights on the song "Never Let Go", on their 2014 album, Medieval Chamber. On their 2022-23 World Tour, Frusciante would perform a portion of Danny's Song at two sold-out Red Hot Chili Peppers concerts, in Boston and Melbourne.
- The song was covered by Marianne Nowottny and Her All American Band on their 2018 album Studio Recordings 2008–2018.
