= What About Me (Anne Murray song) =

Single by Anne Murray

from the album Danny's Song
- A-side: "Let Sunshine Have Its Day"
- Released: May 1973
- Genre: Country
- Length: 2:40
- Label: Capitol 3600
- Songwriter: Scott McKenzie
- Producer: Brian Ahern

Anne Murray singles chronology
"Danny's Song" (1972)	"What About Me" (1973)	"Send a Little Love My Way" (1973)

"What About Me" is a song written by Scott McKenzie, and recorded by Canadian singer Anne Murray. The song was originally released on her 1968 debut album, What About Me. A live version appeared on her 1973 album Danny's Song, and this version was released as a single in 1973, which reached No. 1 on the Canadian Adult Contemporary chart and No. 2 on both the Canadian Country chart and the U.S. Adult Contemporary chart. The song was produced by Brian Ahern.

== Chart performance ==
=== Anne Murray ===
Chart (1973)	Peak position
Australia KMR	93
Canadian RPM Country Tracks	2
Canadian RPM Top Singles	22
Canadian RPM Adult Contemporary	1
New Zealand (Listener)	15
US Hot Country Songs (Billboard)	20
US Billboard Hot 100	64
US Adult Contemporary (Billboard)	2
US Cash Box	37
