= Golden Oldie (song) =

1976 single by Anne Murray

Single by Anne Murray

from the album Keeping in Touch
- B-side: "Together"
- Released: April 1976
- Genre: Country
- Length: 3:44
- Label: Capitol Records 4265
- Songwriter(s): Brian Russell, Brenda Russell
- Producer(s): Tom Catalano

Anne Murray singles chronology
"The Call" (1976)	"Golden Oldie" (1976)	"Things" (1976)

"Golden Oldie" is a song written by Brian and Brenda Russell and performed by Anne Murray. The song reached No. 18 on both the Canadian Country chart and the Canadian Adult Contemporary chart in 1976. The song appeared on her 1976 album, Keeping in Touch. The song was produced by Tom Catalano.

== Chart performance ==
Chart (1976)	Peak position
Canadian RPM Country Tracks	18
Canadian RPM Adult Contemporary	18
U.S. Country	41
U.S. Adult Contemporary	44
