= Singalong Jubilee =

1961–1974 Canadian television program

- Presented by: Bill Langstroth; Jim Bennet
- Music by: Brian Ahern
- Opening theme: "Farewell to Nova Scotia"

Production
- Producer: Manny Pittson

Original release
- Network: CBC Television
- Release: 1961 – 1974

Singalong Jubilee is a CBC Television program produced between 1961 and 1974. It featured musical performances by local singers, playing folk, country, and gospel music, in studio on stage and on location. Anne Murray, Catherine McKinnon, Ken Tobias, Edith Butler, Robbie MacNeill, Gene MacLellan, Fred McKenna, and Bud Spencer who first gained fame on Don Messer's Singalong Jubilee then moved over to Singalong Jubilee and then to TV and Radio shows in the Vancouver CBC studios (Come Listen Awhile, A Hatful of Music).

Singalong Jubilee replaced the equally long-running Don Messer's Jubilee, which featured many of the same performers, including McKinnon. The program was produced by Manny Pittson in Halifax, Nova Scotia, and was co-hosted by music producer Bill Langstroth and singer Jim Bennet. (Langstroth was Anne Murray's future husband), with Brian Ahern as the music director.

The programme's theme song was "Farewell to Nova Scotia".
