= Rick Wilkins (musician) =

Canadian composer, conductor and tenor saxophonist

Rick Herbert Richard Wilkins (born 1 February 1937) is a Canadian composer, conductor, and tenor saxophonist. He is primarily known for his work as an arranger. He has worked extensively for CBC and CTV arranging, rehearsing, and often conducting music for television and radio programs of pop-music and variety entertainments. He has arranged music for television specials featuring Julie Amato, Tommy Ambrose, Guido Basso, the Canadian Brass, Burton Cummings, Anne Murray, and Wayne and Shuster among others. In 1976-1977 he worked as a music director for CBS in Los Angeles, where among his projects was directing music for a number of specials starring the Jackson Five.

== Early life and education ==
Wilkins was born and raised in Hamilton, Ontario. While still in his teens he worked as a saxophonist and arranger with Jack Ryan's dance band in the mid-1950s in Hamilton. In 1957, he moved to Toronto where he studied privately with Gordon Delamont and at the Advanced School of Contemporary Music with Phil Nimmons.

== Career ==
Wilkins performed with a number of dance bands in Toronto, including Benny Louis's band. In 1960, he started arranging music for Jack Kane and his orchestra with the Canadian Broadcasting Corporation. In 1970 he recorded an album of Christmas music with the band "Mutual Understanding". In the 1980s and 1990s he performed and recorded with the Boss Brass and also recorded with the Ed Bickert Quartet.

Wilkins became involved with arranging and writing music for CBC Television with whom he was active though the 1990s. He was a Genie Award nominee for Musical Score in a Non-Feature at the 1st Genie Awards in 1980 for his work on the CBC documentary series Dieppe 1942. The same year he scored the Canadian horror film The Changeling, starring George C. Scott.

In 1994 Wilkins arranged and conducted the musical accompaniment for jazz pianist Oliver Jones' album From Lush to Lively.

Wilkins played with the Brass Connection II in 2000; in 2002, he was made a Member of the Order of Canada. Shortly after this he joined a "big band" organized by John MacLeod, another former Boss Brass player.

In 2018 the Ensemble Vivant released an album of music arranged by him, Tribute to Rick Wilkins.

== Selected compositions ==
- Rink Rat
- Who Asked
