= Anne Murray =

Canadian country singer (born 1945)

Anne Murray CC ONS
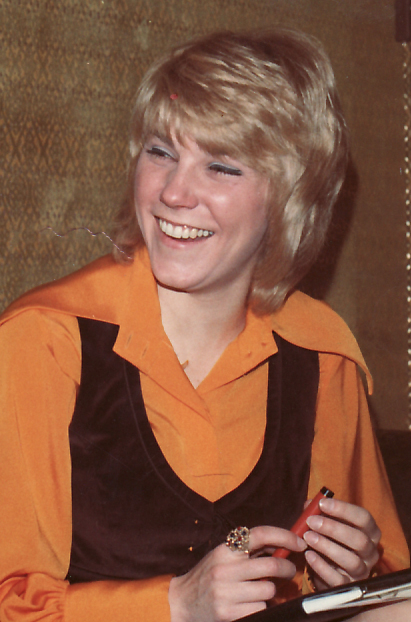
- Murray in 1971
- Born: Morna Anne Murray; June 20, 1945 (age 81); Springhill, Nova Scotia, Canada
- Spouse: Bill Langstroth (m. 1975–1998)
- Children: 2, including Dawn Langstroth
- Musical career
- Origin: Toronto, Ontario, Canada
- Genres: Country; soft rock; pop; adult contemporary
- Occupation: Singer
- Instruments: Vocals; piano; guitar; ukulele
- Years active: 1967–2008
- Labels: Arc; Capitol; Capitol Nashville; Liberty; SBK; EMI Canada; Straightway; Manhattan
- Website: annemurray.com

Morna Anne Murray (born June 20, 1945) is a Canadian retired country, pop and adult contemporary music singer who has sold over 55 million album copies worldwide during her over 40-year career. Murray has won four Grammys including the Grammy Award for Best Female Pop Vocal Performance in 1978.

Murray was the first Canadian female solo singer to reach No. 1 on the U.S. charts and also the first to earn a Gold record for one of her signature songs, "Snowbird" (1970). She is often cited as one of the female Canadian artists who paved the way for other internationally successful Canadian artists such as k.d. lang, Céline Dion, and Shania Twain. Murray is well known for her Grammy Award-winning 1978 number-one hit (in several countries) "You Needed Me", and is the first woman and the first Canadian to win Album of the Year at the 1984 Country Music Association Awards for her Gold-plus 1983 album A Little Good News.

Besides four Grammys, Murray has received a record 25 Juno Awards, three American Music Awards, three Country Music Association Awards, and three Canadian Country Music Association Awards. She has been inducted into the Canadian Country Music Hall of Fame, the Juno Hall of Fame, the Canadian Songwriters Hall of Fame, and Canadian Broadcast Hall of Fame. She is a member of the Country Music Hall of Fame Walkway of Stars in Nashville and has her own star on the Hollywood Walk of Fame in Los Angeles and on Canada's Walk of Fame in Toronto.

In 2011, Billboard ranked her 10th on their list of the 50 Biggest Adult Contemporary Artists Ever. In 2026, Grunge named her Most Beautiful voice in Soft Rock history.

== Early life and education ==
Morna Anne Murray was born on June 20, 1945 in the coal-mining town of Springhill, Nova Scotia, to nurse and charity worker Marion Margaret (née Burke; 1914–2006), and Dr. James Carson Murray (1908–1980), the town's physician. She had five brothers; her youngest brother Bruce died in 2020.

After expressing an early interest in music, she studied piano for six years. By age 15, she was taking a bus ride every Saturday morning from Springhill to Tatamagouche, Nova Scotia for singing lessons. One of her earliest performances was of the song "Ave Maria" (Note: The part of the source available online does not say which version of "Ave Maria" this was, but the best-known ones are those by Bach/Gounod and by Schubert.) at her high-school graduation in 1962. Following high school, Murray attended Mount Saint Vincent University in Halifax for one year. She later studied Physical Education at University of New Brunswick in Fredericton. After receiving her degree in 1966, she taught physical education at Athena Regional High School in Summerside, Prince Edward Island for one year.

Her brother Bruce Murray released several recordings himself and had several songs on the RPM charts between 1976 and 1982.

== Career ==
=== Early years ===
In 1965, Murray appeared on the University of New Brunswick student project record "The Groove" (500 pressed). She sang two songs on the record – "Unchained Melody" and "Little Bit of Soap". On the label, her name was misspelled "Anne Murry". While there, she was encouraged to audition for the 1960s CBC musical variety television show Singalong Jubilee, but was not offered a singing position.

After a summer of singing in local venues across the Maritimes, Murray began teaching physical education at the high school in Summerside, Prince Edward Island. After one year of teaching, she was cast for Singalong Jubilee. As a regular member of the "Singalong Jubilee" cast, Murray appeared on the Singalong Jubilee Vol. III soundtrack and Our Family Album – The Singalong Jubilee Cast records released by Arc Records. The show's musical director, Brian Ahern, advised Murray that she should move to Toronto and record a solo album. Her first album, What About Me, was produced by Ahern in Toronto and released in 1968 on the Arc label.

=== Chart success, 1970s–1980s ===
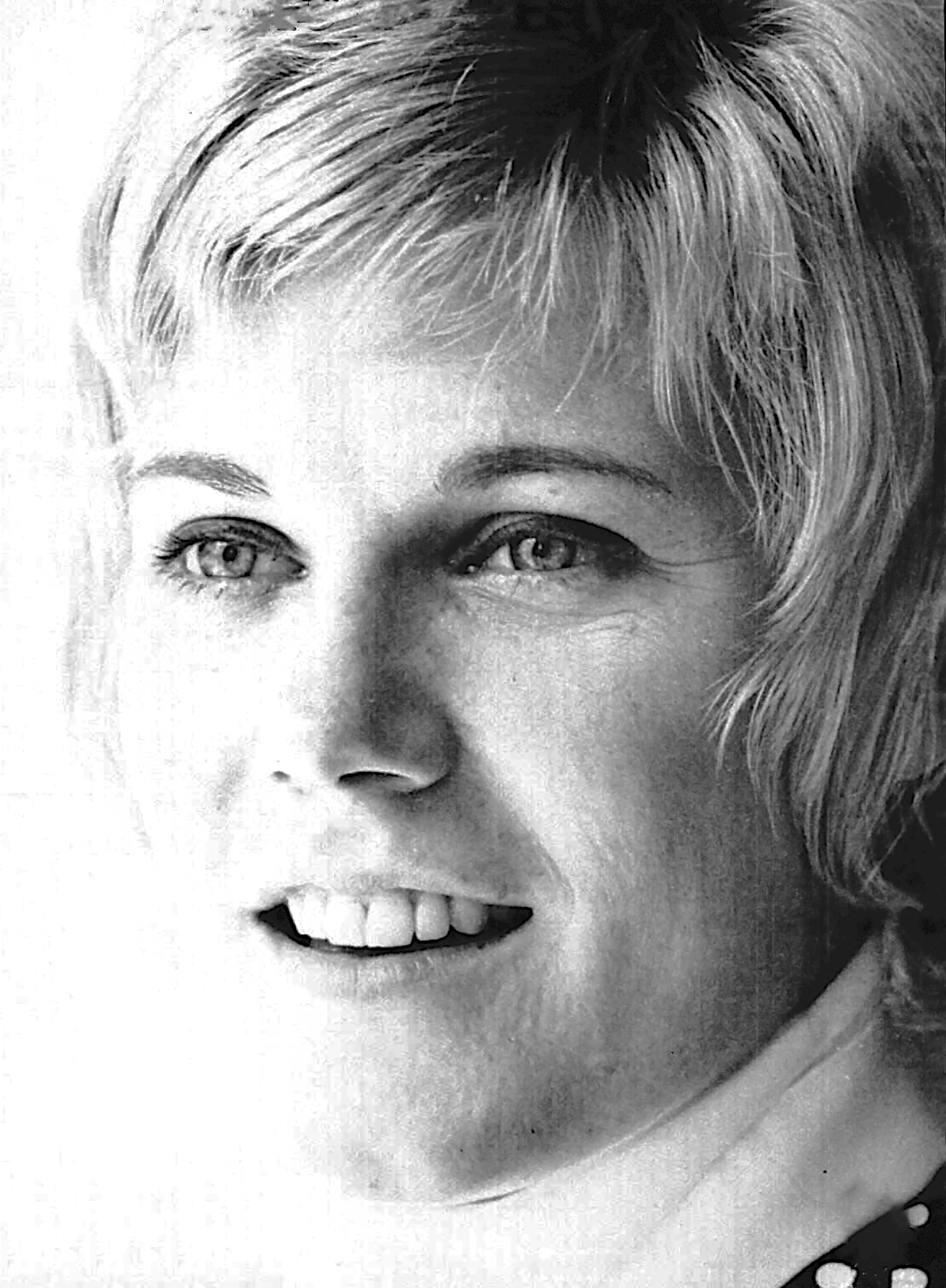
Murray in 1970

"What About Me," the lead single and title cut on Murray's debut album, was written by Scott McKenzie and was a sizable Canadian radio hit. The album covered songs by Joni Mitchell, Ken Tobias, and John Denver. After a year-long stint on Arc, Murray switched to Capitol Records in 1969 to record her second album, This Way Is My Way, which was released that fall. It featured the single that launched her career, "Snowbird", which became a No. 1 hit in Canada. "Snowbird" became a surprise hit on the U.S. charts as well, reaching No. 8 on the Billboard Hot 100 in 1970. It was also the first of her eight No. 1 Adult Contemporary hits. "Snowbird" was the first Gold record ever given to a Canadian artist in the United States (RIAA certified Gold on November 16, 1970). "Snowbird" was released during the first substantial wave of Canadian songs and artists to achieve widespread success in the United States, following the breakthrough success of The Guess Who in 1969. As one of the most successful female artists at that time, she became in demand for several television appearances in Canada and the United States, eventually becoming a regular on the hit U.S. television series The Glen Campbell Goodtime Hour.

After the success of "Snowbird", Murray had a number of subsequent singles that charted both pop and country simultaneously. During the 1970s and 1980s, her hits included Kenny Loggins's "Danny's Song" (1972) (peaked at No. 7 on the Hot 100), "A Love Song" (1973), "He Thinks I Still Care", The Beatles' "You Won't See Me" (1974); her all-time biggest Hot 100 hit "You Needed Me" (1978), "I Just Fall in Love Again", "Shadows in the Moonlight", "Broken Hearted Me" (1979), "I'm Happy Just to Dance With You" (1980), which hit No. 64 on the Hot 100 and No. 23 on the Country chart, The Monkees' 1967 No. 1 hit "Daydream Believer", "Could I Have This Dance" from the Urban Cowboy motion picture soundtrack (1980), "Blessed Are the Believers" (1981), "Another Sleepless Night" (1982), "A Little Good News" (1983), "Just Another Woman in Love", "Nobody Loves Me Like You Do", and "Time, Don't Run Out on Me" (1985).

She performed "O Canada" at the first American League baseball game played in Canada on April 7, 1977, when the Toronto Blue Jays played the Chicago White Sox at Exhibition Stadium. She reprised the Canadian national anthem prior to the first World Series game held in Canada, Game 3 of the 1992 World Series at the SkyDome. Following the last game at Maple Leaf Gardens, she concluded the arena's closing ceremony by singing "The Maple Leaf Forever" at centre ice wearing a Toronto Maple Leafs jersey.

Murray was a celebrity corporate spokeswoman for The Bay, and she also did commercials and sang the company jingle ("You Can Count on the Commerce") for the Canadian Imperial Bank of Commerce (CIBC).

Murray's last Hot 100 hit was "Now and Forever (You and Me)" from 1986; it was also her last No. 1 on both the American and Canadian country charts.

=== 1990s–2000s ===
Murray's last charting single in the U.S. was 1991's "Everyday", which appeared on Billboard's Country Singles chart. In 1996, Murray signed on with a new manager, Bruce Allen. She recorded her first live album in 1997, and in 1999, she released What a Wonderful World, a platinum inspirational album, which went to No. 1 Contemporary Christian, No. 4 Country and No. 38 pop. Murray's last charting single in Canada was the title track "What a Wonderful World" in 2000.

Murray was briefly mentioned in the Oscar-nominated satirical song "Blame Canada," which appeared in the 1999 film South Park: Bigger, Longer & Uncut. Although the tune contained the line "With all their hockey hullabaloo/And that bitch Anne Murray, too", the singer indicated that she was not offended by the song (although she did turn down a chance to sing it at the Oscars telecast that year, pleading a prior commitment).

She released Country Croonin' in 2002, the follow-up to her successful 1993 album, Croonin'. In 2004, she released I'll Be Seeing You in Canada only, which features a collection of songs from the early 20th century to the mid-1940s. The 2005 American version, titled All of Me, features a bonus disc containing many of her hit singles. The album is dedicated to her friend Cynthia McReynolds who died of cancer.

On December 26, 2004, Murray joined other Canadian music stars in the Canada for Asia Telethon, a three-hour, tsunami relief concert broadcast on CBC Television (January 13, 2005) to support CARE Canada's efforts. Bryan Adams and Murray closed the show with a duet, "What Would It Take".

On October 10, 2007, Murray announced that she would embark on her final major tour. She toured in February and March 2008 in the U.S. on the "Coast-to-Coast – One Last Time" tour followed by a run in April and May in Canada. Murray's final public concert was held at the Sony Centre in Toronto on May 23, 2008.

The studio album Anne Murray Duets: Friends & Legends was released in November 2007 in Canada and January 2008 in the U.S. The album comprised 17 tracks that included many of Murray's biggest hits over her four-decade career, re-recorded as duets with other established, rising, and – in one case – deceased female singers. These artists included Céline Dion, Shania Twain, k.d. lang, Nelly Furtado, Jann Arden, Québec's Isabelle Boulay, Murray's daughter Dawn Langstroth, Olivia Newton-John, Emmylou Harris, Martina McBride, Shelby Lynne, Amy Grant, Carole King, the Indigo Girls, Irish sextet Celtic Woman, Dusty Springfield, and Sarah Brightman. The duet with soprano Brightman was of her 1970 hit song, "Snowbird".

Anne Murray Duets: Friends and Legends was recorded in four cities – Toronto, Nashville, New York, and Los Angeles. According to Billboard magazine, the album reached No. 2 on the Canadian pop album charts and was certified Double Platinum in Canada after merely two months, representing sales of over 200,000 units. The album was the second-highest debuting CD on the Billboard Top 200 albums chart for the week ending February 2, 2008. It entered the chart at No. 42, making it her highest-charting U.S. CD release since 1999's What a Wonderful World, which peaked at No. 38 on the Top 200 and was certified Platinum by the Recording Industry Association of America (RIAA). Also for the week ending February 2, 2008, the CD debuted at No. 8 on Billboard's Top Country Albums chart and at No. 3 on its Top Internet Albums chart. Murray was nominated for the 2008 Juno Award for Album of the Year and Pop Album of the Year.

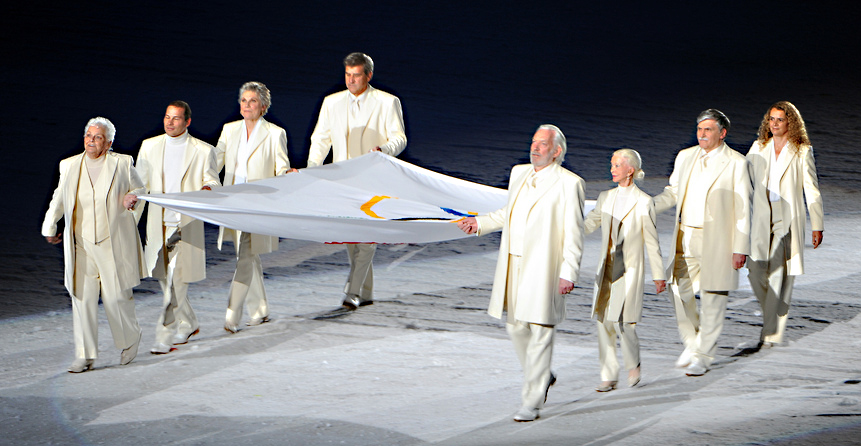
Murray (third from left) was one of 8 notable Canadians to carry the Olympic Flag at the 2010 Olympic Opening Ceremony

Murray's album What a Wonderful World was re-released in July 2008 in North America as a 14-song package. A new Christmas album, titled Anne Murray's Christmas Album with bonus DVD was released in October 2008. Sony BMG Music also released an Elvis Presley Christmas album, titled Christmas Duets on October 14, 2008, featuring a virtual duet of "Silver Bells" with Murray.

Murray retired from both recording and performing after the issue of her final Christmas album in 2008, later explaining, "I did it for 40 years and that's long enough to do anything...I wanted to go out still singing well, and not having to make excuses." Despite continuing offers to take part in live concert appearances, duets and other recording activities, Murray has remained firmly retired since then, and insists she hasn't second-guessed the decision for a moment: "I was one of those who couldn't. I have too much trouble settling for less." She later remarked in 2026: "I found that my voice couldn't take working three nights on, a night off, two nights on (...) my voice would not do what I wanted it to do on a consistent basis."

In June 2025, she announced the album Here You Are, which was released on September 5, 2025: a compilation of previously unreleased tracks recorded earlier in her career, including a cover of Bryan Adams's "Straight from the Heart". Murray also lent her voice to voice-tracking for a Sirius XM Christmas music channel, Holidays with Anne Murray and Friends, during the 2025 holiday season.

On October 27, 2025, a Nashville tribute to Murray's career was held at the Opry House, home to the Grand Ole Opry, with Trisha Yearwood, k.d. lang, and Randy Travis in attendance. The evening included a surprise appearance by Nancy Jones, the widow of country singer George Jones, who was among those who called for Murray to be inducted into the Country Music Hall of Fame.

=== Television ===
Murray has had five highly-rated U.S. specials on CBS (over 40 million viewers each) and several Canadian specials on CBC including Anne Murray in Nova Scotia, Intimate Evening with Anne Murray, Anne Murray RSVP, A Special Anne Murray Christmas, Legends & Friends, Greatest Hits II, What a Wonderful World, Ladies Night Show, Anne Murray in Walt Disney World and Anne Murray's Classic Christmas. Her 2008 television special, Family Christmas, garnered a 43 per cent share on CBC with 4.2 million viewers.

She has appeared on The Johnny Cash Show, The Bobby Vinton Show , Solid Gold , Sesame Street , The Muppet Show , Family Guy , The Midnight Special , Saturday Night Live , The Tonight Show Starring Johnny Carson , Dean Martin Summer Show , Singalong Jubilee , Dinah! , The Today Show , Dolly!, The Mike Douglas Show, Christmas in Washington, Boston Pops, The Helen Reddy Show, The Oprah Winfrey Show, 20/20, CNN, Perry Como's Christmas in New Mexico, The Glen Campbell Goodtime Hour , Night of a 100 Stars, Live with Regis and Kathie Lee, The Pat Sajak Show, Royal Canadian Air Farce and Good Morning America.

Her 2005 CBC special Anne Murray: The Music of My Life broke ratings records for a Thursday night, with more than 7 million Canadian viewers tuned in. She also appeared on ABC-TV's American Bandstand, and on regional US dance/variety programs.

On August 25, 2008, Murray appeared on the TV program Canadian Idol as a mentor.

Anne Murray: Full Circle, a documentary film by Adrian Buitenhuis and Morgan Elliott, was broadcast by CBC Television in 2021.

== Personal life ==
In 2009, Murray released her autobiography, All of Me, and embarked on a 15-city book signing tour, starting in Nashville on October 27, 2009, and ending in Ottawa on November 24, 2009. The tour also included a special In Conversation interview with Michael Posner at the International Festival of Authors in Toronto on October 30, 2009.

She is Catholic.

Her nephew Paul Murray was lead singer of the 1990s Canadian alternative rock group Sandbox, while her nephew Dale Murray has been associated with the bands The Guthries and Cuff the Duke.

=== Marriage and children ===
In 1975, Murray married Bill Langstroth, music producer and longtime host of Singalong Jubilee. They had two children – William (born 1976) and Dawn (born 1979). Dawn is a singer-songwriter and artist who has recorded with her mother a number of times, including the duet "Let There Be Love" in 1999 for Murray's What a Wonderful World album. Murray and Dawn were featured in a mother–daughter duet of "Nobody Loves Me Like You Do" on Murray's hit 2008 U.S. CD (released in late 2007 in Canada), Anne Murray Duets: Friends & Legends. Murray and Langstroth separated in 1997 and divorced the following year. Langstroth died in May 2013.

In January 1998, Murray and Dawn performed at a benefit concert for Sheena's Place, an eating disorder treatment centre in Toronto. Both have spoken publicly about Dawn's struggle with anorexia nervosa, which developed when she was 10 years old. Dawn has since sought treatment and continues to pursue a career in music.

Murray lived in Thornhill, Ontario, for over 40 years, from the late 1970s through 2019. In 2019, she returned to live in her home province of Nova Scotia, settling in Halifax.

=== Philanthropy and support for causes ===
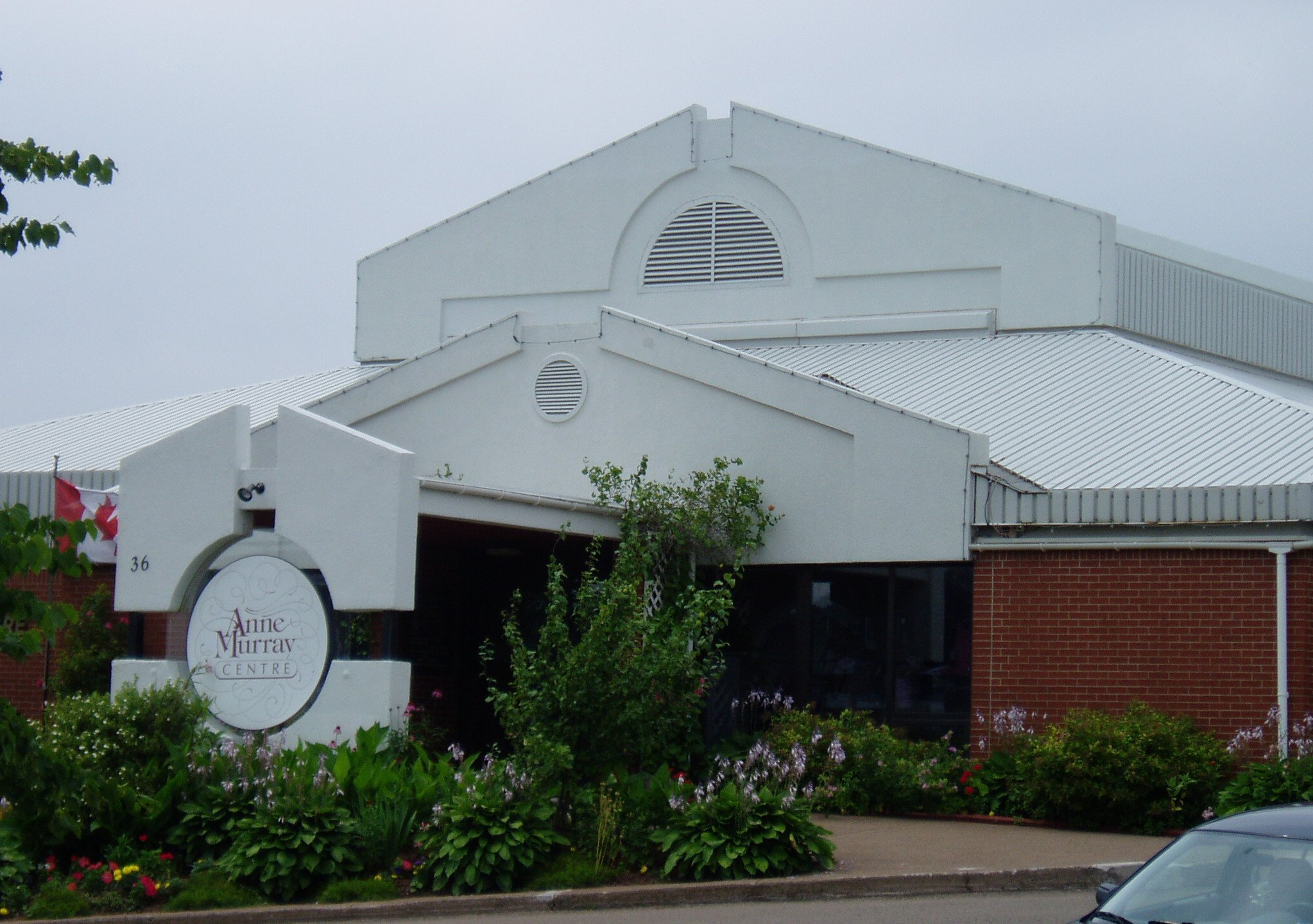
The Anne Murray Centre in Springhill, Nova Scotia

Murray kept close ties with her hometown, Springhill, Nova Scotia, located about an hour east of Moncton, New Brunswick, and two hours north of Halifax, Nova Scotia. The Anne Murray Centre, located in Springhill, opened on July 28, 1989, and houses a collection of memorabilia from both her personal life and professional career in a series of displays. A registered Canadian charity, the centre aims to foster tourism in the area and promote awareness of the music of Nova Scotia and Canada. All the revenue generated from its operation is used to provide employment for local people and for its ongoing maintenance.

Murray was involved in the construction of the Dr. Carson and Marion Murray Community Centre in Springhill, Nova Scotia. She served as the honorary chair of the fundraising campaign to replace the town arena that collapsed after a peewee hockey game in 2002. Named for her parents, the Dr. Carson and Marion Murray Community Centre sports an NHL-size ice sheet with seating for 800 people, a walking track, multi-purpose room, community room with seating for up to 300, and a gym. The Dr. Carson and Marion Murray Community Centre has become an integral part of the Springhill community since opening on September 15, 2004.

Murray was involved in a variety of charitable organizations. In addition to being the Honorary National Chairperson of the Canadian Save The Children Fund, she served as a spokeswoman for many charities throughout her career – most recently Colon Cancer Canada. On May 20, 2009, Colon Cancer Canada launched the inaugural Anne Murray Charity Golf Classic. Over C$150,000 was raised through the event.

On February 12, 2010, Murray was one of the eight Canadians who carried the Olympic flag during the opening ceremony of the XXI Olympic Winter Games in Vancouver.

Murray was a public supporter of Canadian environmentalist and geneticist David Suzuki's Nature Challenge.

=== Golf ===
A longtime golf enthusiast, Murray made history in October 2003 at the Turning Stone Resort & Casino in Verona, New York, by becoming the first woman to score a hole in one on the 108-yard, par 3, 17th hole at the Kaluhyat Golf Club. On May 11, 2007, Golf For Women magazine named Murray the world's best female celebrity golfer, noting her 11 handicap.

== Discography ==
Since 1968, Murray has released 33 studio albums and 15 compilation albums.

Studio albums

- What About Me (1968)
- This Way Is My Way (1969)
- Honey, Wheat and Laughter (1970)
- Straight, Clean and Simple (1971)
- Anne Murray / Glen Campbell (1971) (with Glen Campbell)
- Talk It Over in the Morning (1971)
- Annie (1972)
- Danny's Song (1973)
- Love Song (1974)
- Highly Prized Possession (1974)
- Together (1975)
- Keeping in Touch (1976)
- There's a Hippo in My Tub (1977)
- Let's Keep It That Way (1978)
- New Kind of Feeling (1979)
- I'll Always Love You (1979)
- Somebody's Waiting (1980)
- Where Do You Go When You Dream (1981)
- Christmas Wishes (1981)
- The Hottest Night of the Year (1982)
- A Little Good News (1983)
- Heart Over Mind (1984)
- Something to Talk About (1986)
- Harmony (1987)
- As I Am (1988)
- You Will (1990)
- Yes I Do (1991)
- Croonin' (1993)
- Anne Murray (1996)
- What a Wonderful World (1999)
- Country Croonin' (2002)
- I'll Be Seeing You (2004)
- Duets: Friends & Legends (2007)
- Here You Are (2025)

=== Bibliography ===
- Murray, Anne (2009). All of Me. With Michael Posner. Vintage Canada. ISBN 978-0-307-39845-1.

== Awards and honours ==
Anne Murray won four Grammys (including one in the pop category), three American Music Awards, three CMA Awards, and a record 25 Juno Awards.

In 1995, Murray received a Governor General's Performing Arts Award for Lifetime Artistic Achievement, Canada's highest honour in the performing arts.

Murray was ranked No. 24 in Country Music Television's 40 Greatest Women of Country Music in 2002.

Murray was invested as an Officer of the Order of Canada in 1975 and promoted to Companion of the Order of Canada in 1984, the second highest honour that can be awarded to a Canadian civilian. She was also one of the first recipients of the newly established Order of Nova Scotia in 2002.

In 2006, the Canadian Songwriters Hall of Fame chose her and Leonard Cohen as recipients of the Legacy Award for their contributions to and support of the Canadian songwriting industry. Murray was recognized for her support of Canada's songwriters, through her performances and her recordings.

On June 29, 2007, Canada Post issued the limited edition Anne Murray stamp. She was recognized along with three other Canadian recording artists: Paul Anka, Gordon Lightfoot, and Joni Mitchell.

On May 20, 2016, Anne Murray was granted an honorary degree by Mount Saint Vincent University.

Grammy Award Nominations/Wins:

- 1970 – Best New Artist; Best Contemporary Vocal Performance, Female, "Snowbird"
- 1973 – Best Pop Vocal Performance, Female, "Danny's Song"
- 1974 – Best Country Vocal Performance, Female, Love Song (WON)
- 1978 – Record of the Year, "You Needed Me"; Best Country Vocal Performance, Female, "Walk Right Back"; Best Pop Vocal Performance, Female, "You Needed Me" (WON)
- 1979 – Best Recording for Children, Anne Murray Sings for the Sesame Street Generation
- 1980 – Best Country Vocal Performance, Female, "Could I Have This Dance" (WON)
- 1983 – Best Country Vocal Performance, Female, "A Little Good News" (WON)
- 1984 – Best Country Vocal Performance, Female, Heart Over Mind; Best Country Performance by a Duo or Group with Vocal, "Nobody Loves Me Like You Do"

Billboard Top 100 Year-End Rankings:

- 1970 - "Snowbird" - No. 42
- 1973 - "Danny's Song" - No. 36
- 1974 - "You Won't See Me" - No. 54; "A Love Song" - No. 80
- 1978 - "You Needed Me" - No. 63
- 1979 - "I Just Fall in Love Again" - No. 72
- 1980 - "Daydream Believer" - No. 61; "Broken Hearted Me" - No. 92
