= Brian Ahern =

Canadian record producer and guitarist (1945–2026)

Brian Ahern CM
- Born: 8 January 1945; Halifax, Nova Scotia, Canada
- Died: 9 November 2026 (aged 81) Duluth, Minnesota, U.S.
- Genres: Folk, country
- Occupations: Musician, producer
- Instrument: Guitar
- Years active: 1961–20??
- Spouse: Emmylou Harris (m. 1977; div. 1984)
- Website: BAAM Music

Brian Ahern, CM (8 January 1945 – 9 November 2026) was a Canadian record producer and guitarist. He produced albums for a wide variety of artists, including 12 albums for Anne Murray; 11 albums for Emmylou Harris (to whom he was also married for seven years); he also produced discs for Johnny Cash, Willie Nelson, George Jones, Roy Orbison, Glen Campbell, Don Williams, Jesse Winchester, and Linda Ronstadt. Ahern was inducted into the Canadian Country Music Hall of Fame in 2006 in Saint John, New Brunswick. He was given the Lifetime Achievement Award for Producer/Engineer during The Americana Music Association Awards at the Ryman Auditorium, in Nashville, TN on Thursday, 9 September 2010 by former wife Emmylou Harris and musician Rodney Crowell.

Ahern became renowned for his recording studio Enactron Truck, which produced over 40 gold and platinum records (including Bette Midler's The Rose and Barbra Streisand's A Star Is Born).

== Los Angeles years ==
When Emmylou Harris was contracted to Reprise, Ahern was specifically assigned to produce her records. Harris' Reprise debut Pieces of the Sky was released in 1975. Ahern and Harris assembled many of the musicians who had played on Gram Parsons solo albums, including James Burton, Glen D. Hardin, and Ron Tutt for the sessions. Ahern had signed Texas songwriter Rodney Crowell to his publishing company prior to starting work with Harris and introduced Harris to Crowell's songs. Harris would record a number of Crowell's songs on her Ahern-produced albums including "Till I Gain Control Again," "Leaving Louisiana In The Broad Daylight," "Ashes By Now," "You're Supposed To Be Feelin' Good," "Angel Eyes (Angel Eyes)," and "I Don't Have To Crawl." Ahern produced all of Harris' Warner Bros/Reprise recordings through 1983's White Shoes, including #1 albums Elite Hotel (1975) and Luxury Liner (1977).

On 9 January 1977, Ahern and Harris were married at his home in Halifax, Nova Scotia. They had one daughter together in 1979. Ahern and Harris divorced in 1984.

While in Los Angeles, Ahern also produced Rodney Crowell's debut album Ain't Living Long Like This, Johnny Cash's Silver (including the hit "Ghost Riders in the Sky"), and two albums by Mary Kay Place.

== Nashville years ==
In Nashville, he produced Ricky Skaggs, Marty Robbins, and George Jones. Ahern continued to produce Emmylou Harris, the last recording being All I Intended to Be in 2008.

== Personal life and death ==
Ahern was born in Halifax on 8 January 1945, one of six children. He was of Scottish and Irish descent.

Ahern married Emmylou Harris in 1977, and had one daughter. They divorced in 1984. He died at his home in Duluth, Minnesota, on 9 November 2026, at the age of 81.

== Honours ==
On 28 December 2019, Governor General Julie Payette announced that Ahern had been appointed a Member of the Order of Canada (CM).

== See Also ==
- Singalong Jubilee, a 1961-74 CBC variety program with music by Ahern
