= Anne Murray's Greatest Hits =

Greatest hits album by Anne Murray
- Released: September 7, 1980
- Recorded: 1970–1980
- Genres: Country, adult contemporary
- Length: 32:05
- Label: Capitol
- Producers: Brian Ahern; Jim Ed Norman

Anne Murray chronology
A Country Collection (1980)	Anne Murray's Greatest Hits (1980)	Where Do You Go When You Dream (1981)

Professional ratings
Review scores
Source	Rating
AllMusic	4.5/5 stars

Anne Murray's Greatest Hits is the second compilation album by the Canadian country pop artist of the same name, released in 1980 via Capitol Records. It is a collection of nine previously issued singles released between 1970 and 1980, as well as one new track, "Could I Have This Dance", which was newly recorded for this album (and simultaneously appeared on the soundtrack to the film Urban Cowboy) reaching #33 on Billboard's Hot 100.

Though Murray's fourth compilation album, Greatest Hits was the first collection of her biggest charting singles, from her breakthrough Top 10 smash, "Snowbird", through 1980. (Previous compilations had included some of Murray's chart hits along with album tracks and lesser known songs.) It peaked at #16 on the Billboard album chart, hit #2 (where it held for nine weeks) on the Top Country Albums chart, and is certified 4× Multi-Platinum by the RIAA in the United States – Anne's biggest selling career disc.

== Track listing ==
No.	Title	Writer(s)	Original album	Length
1.	"Snowbird"	Gene MacLellan	This Way Is My Way	2:15
2.	"Danny's Song"	Kenny Loggins	Danny's Song	3:09
3.	"A Love Song"	D.L. George, Loggins	Love Song	2:50
4.	"You Won't See Me"	John Lennon, Paul McCartney	Love Song	4:07
5.	"You Needed Me"	Randy Goodrum	Let's Keep It That Way	3:41
6.	"I Just Fall in Love Again"	Steve Dorff, Larry Herbstritt, Harry Lloyd, Gloria Sklerov	New Kind of Feeling	2:52
7.	"Shadows in the Moonlight"	Charlie Black, Rory Bourke	New Kind of Feeling	3:30
8.	"Broken Hearted Me"	Goodrum	I'll Always Love You	3:57
9.	"Daydream Believer"	John Stewart	I'll Always Love You	2:28
10.	"Could I Have This Dance"	Wayland Holyfield, Bob House	Urban Cowboy Soundtrack	3:16
Total length:				32:05

== Credits ==
- Balmur Limited – executive producers
- Brian Ahern – producer (1–4), arrangements (1–4)
- Jim Ed Norman – producer (5–10)
- Ken Perry – mastering at Capitol Mastering (Hollywood, California, USA)
- Roy Kohara – art direction
- Phil Shima – design
- Gord Marci – front cover photography

== Charts ==
=== Weekly charts ===
Chart (1980–81)	Peak position
Australia (Kent Music Report)	8
Canada Top Albums/CDs (RPM)	7
Canada Country Albums/CDs (RPM)	1
New Zealand Albums (RMNZ)	1
US Billboard 200	16
US Top Country Albums (Billboard)	2

=== Year-end charts ===
Chart (1980)	Position
Canada Top Albums/CDs (RPM)	48
Chart (1981)	Position
Canada Top Albums/CDs (RPM)	45
New Zealand Albums (RMNZ)	13
US Top Country Albums (Billboard)	8
Chart (1982)	Position
US Top Country Albums (Billboard)	49

== Certifications ==
Region	Certification	Certified units/sales
Australia (ARIA)	Platinum	50,000^{^}
Canada (Music Canada)	6× Platinum	600,000^{^}
United States (RIAA)	4× Platinum	4,000,000^{^}
^{^} Shipments figures based on certification alone.
