= All of Me (Anne Murray album) =

Compilation album by Anne Murray
- Released: January 25, 2005
- Genre: Country
- Length: 1:43:25
- Label: Straightway Records
- Producers: Brian Ahern Anne Murray Jim Ed Norman Tommy West

Anne Murray chronology
| I'll Be Seeing You (2004) | All of Me (2005) | Duets: Friends & Legends (2007) |

Professional ratings
Review scores
| Source | Rating |
|---|---|
| Allmusic | 4/5 stars |

All of Me is a compilation album by Canadian artist Anne Murray. It was released by Straightway Records on January 25, 2005. The first disc had been released as I'll Be Seeing You in 2004. All of Me peaked at number 13 on the Billboard Top Country Albums chart.

== Track listing ==
Disc 1
| No. | Title | Writer(s) | Length |
|---|---|---|---|
| 1. | "All of Me" | Gerald Marks, Seymour Simons | 2:57 |
| 2. | "As Time Goes By" | Herman Hupfeld | 3:07 |
| 3. | "Dream a Little Dream of Me" | Fabian Andre, Gus Kahn, Wilbur Schwandt | 3:02 |
| 4. | "I Wonder Who's Kissing Him Now" | Frank Adams, Will Hough, Joe Howard, Harold Orlob | 3:10 |
| 5. | "I'm Gonna Sit Right Down and Write Myself a Letter" | Fred E. Ahlert, Joe Young | 2:55 |
| 6. | "Over the Rainbow" | Harold Arlen, E. Y. Harburg | 3:19 |
| 7. | "Twilight Time" | Artie Dunn, Al Nevins, Morty Nevins, Buck Ram | 3:36 |
| 8. | "My Buddy" | Walter Donaldson, Kahn | 4:12 |
| 9. | "After You've Gone" | Henry Creamer, Turner Layton | 3:01 |
| 10. | "What'll I Do" | Irving Berlin | 3:22 |
| 11. | "Don't Get Around Much Anymore" | Duke Ellington, Bob Russell | 2:39 |
| 12. | "Smile" | Charlie Chaplin, Geoffrey Parsons, John Turner | 3:44 |
| 13. | "You Made Me Love You" | James V. Monaco, Joseph McCarthy | 3:17 |
| 14. | "I'll Be Seeing You" | Sammy Fain, Irving Kahal | 4:04 |
| 15. | "We'll Meet Again" | Hughie Charles, Ross Parker | 3:42 |

Disc 2
| No. | Title | Writer(s) | Length |
|---|---|---|---|
| 1. | "Snowbird" | Gene MacLellan | 2:12 |
| 2. | "Danny's Song" | Kenny Loggins | 3:06 |
| 3. | "A Love Song" | D. L. George, Loggins | 2:49 |
| 4. | "You Won't See Me" | John Lennon, Paul McCartney | 4:08 |
| 5. | "You Needed Me" | Randy Goodrum | 3:41 |
| 6. | "I Just Fall in Love Again" | Steve Dorff, Larry Herbstritt, Harry Lloyd, Gloria Sklerov | 2:51 |
| 7. | "Daydream Believer" | John Stewart | 2:29 |
| 8. | "Broken Hearted Me" | Goodrum | 4:00 |
| 9. | "Could I Have This Dance" | Wayland Holyfield, Bob House | 3:17 |
| 10. | "Shadows in the Moonlight" | Charlie Black, Rory Michael Bourke | 3:27 |
| 11. | "A Little Good News" | Black, Bourke, Tommy Rocco | 3:09 |
| 12. | "Just Another Woman in Love" | Wanda Mallette, Patti Ryan | 2:56 |
| 13. | "Another Sleepless Night" | Black, Bourke | 3:07 |
| 14. | "Time Don't Run Out on Me" | Gerry Goffin, Carole King | 3:42 |
| 15. | "Now and Forever (You and Me)" | David Foster, Goodrum, Jim Vallance | 4:15 |
| 16. | "Nobody Loves Me Like You Do" (duet with Dave Loggins) | James Dunne, Pamela Phillips | 3:53 |

== Chart performance ==
| Chart (2005) | Peak position |
|---|---|
| U.S. Billboard Top Country Albums | 13 |
| U.S. Billboard 200 | 66 |
