= List of RPM number-one adult contemporary singles of 1979 =

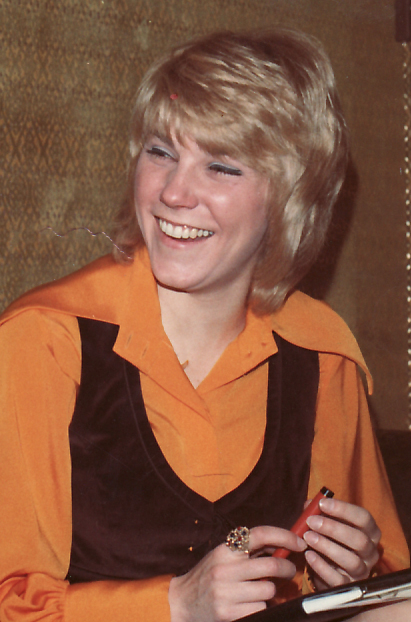
Canadian country singer Anne Murray had the most number-one singles in the 1979 charts, with three hits, and spent four weeks at number one with "I Just Fall in Love Again".

In 1979, RPM magazine published a chart for top-performing singles in the easy listening or adult contemporary categories in Canada. The chart, entitled Adult Oriented Playlist, has undergone numerous name changes, becoming Contemporary Adult in 1981 and became Adult Contemporary in 1984 until the magazine's final publication in November 2000. In 1979, thirty-six singles reached number one in the chart, which contains 50 positions. The first number-one in 1978 was "Time Passages" by British singer-songwriter Al Stewart, continuing from the 1978 charts, and the last was "Babe" by the American rock band Styx. Seventeen acts have their first number-one in the chart in 1979: the Village People, Alicia Bridges, Chic, Nicolette Larson, Boney M., the Pointer Sisters, Gloria Gaynor, the Doobie Brothers, Amii Stewart, Blondie, Suzi Quatro, Chris Norman, Peaches & Herb, Anita Ward, Rex Smith, Herb Alpert and Styx. Three Canadian acts, Anne Murray, Paul Anka and Frank Mills had at least one number-one that year.

Anne Murray had the most number-one singles in 1979, with "I Just Fall in Love Again" (four weeks), "Shadows in the Moonlight" (two weeks) and "Broken Hearted Me" (two weeks), and also had the most weeks at number one, totalling six weeks. American disco singer Gloria Gaynor also had a four-week number-one chart run with "I Will Survive".

== Chart history ==
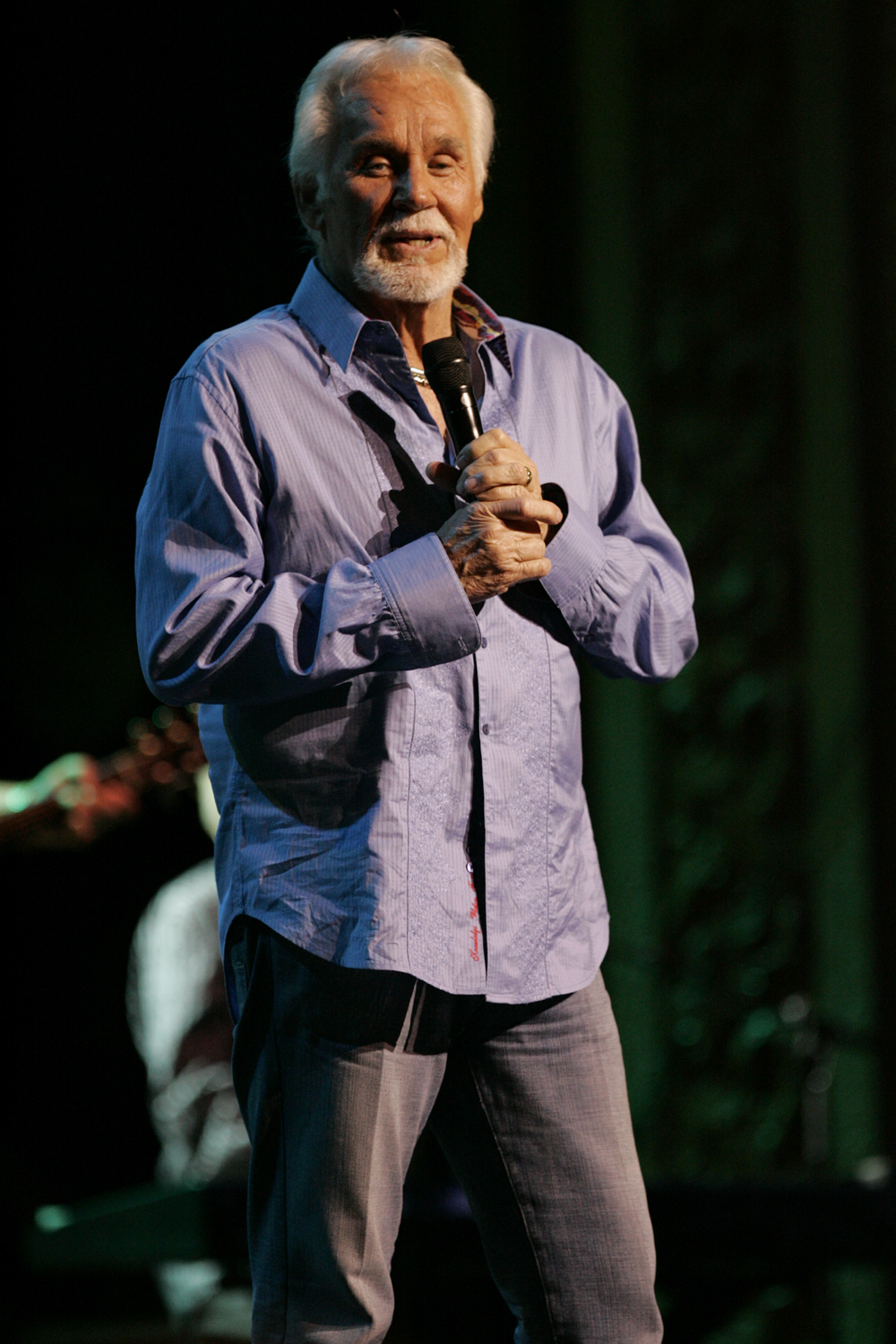
Kenny Rogers topped the charts in 1979 with the singles "She Believes in Me" and "You Decorated My Life".

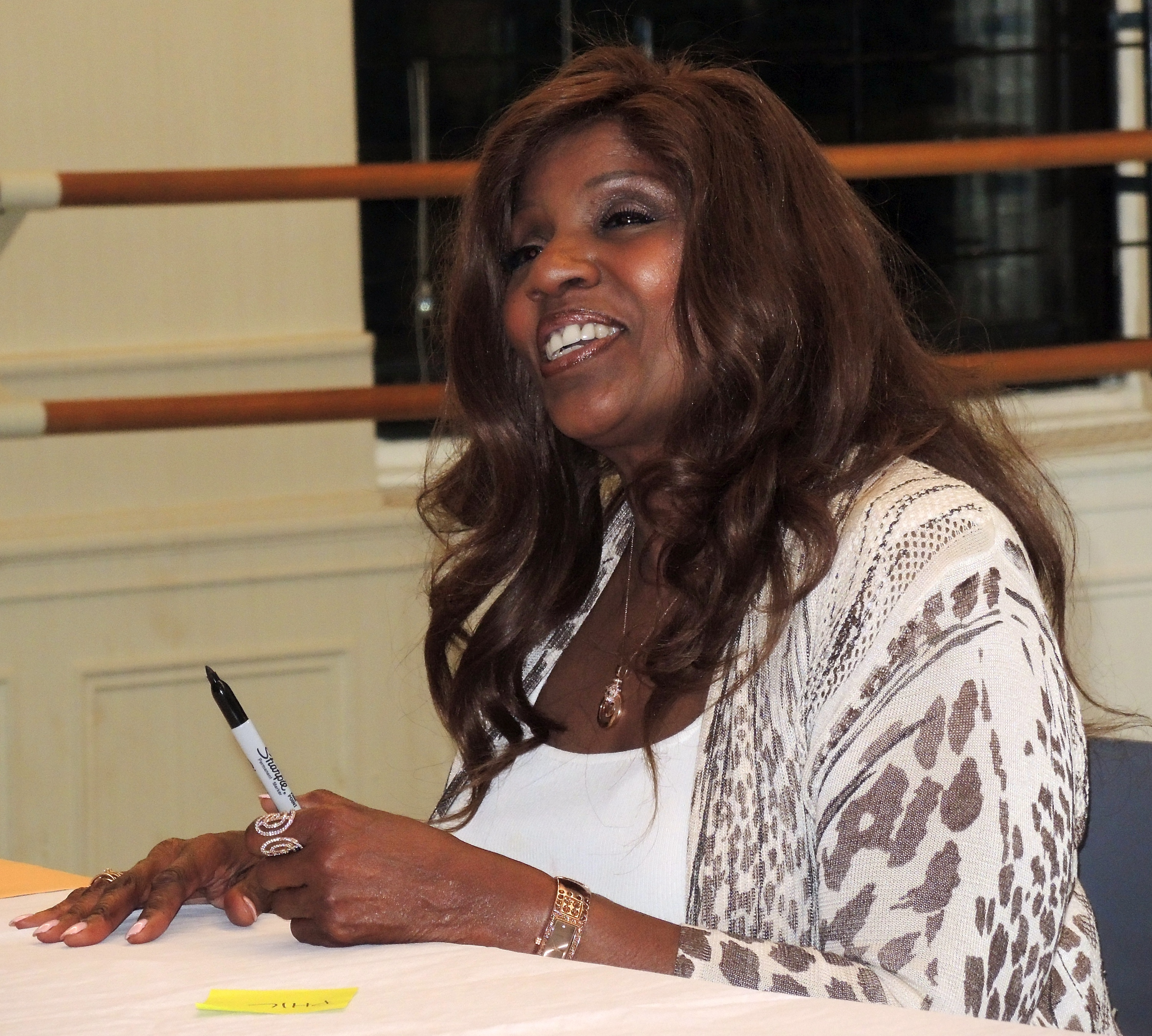
Gloria Gaynor (pictured in 2014) stayed at number one for four weeks with "I Will Survive".

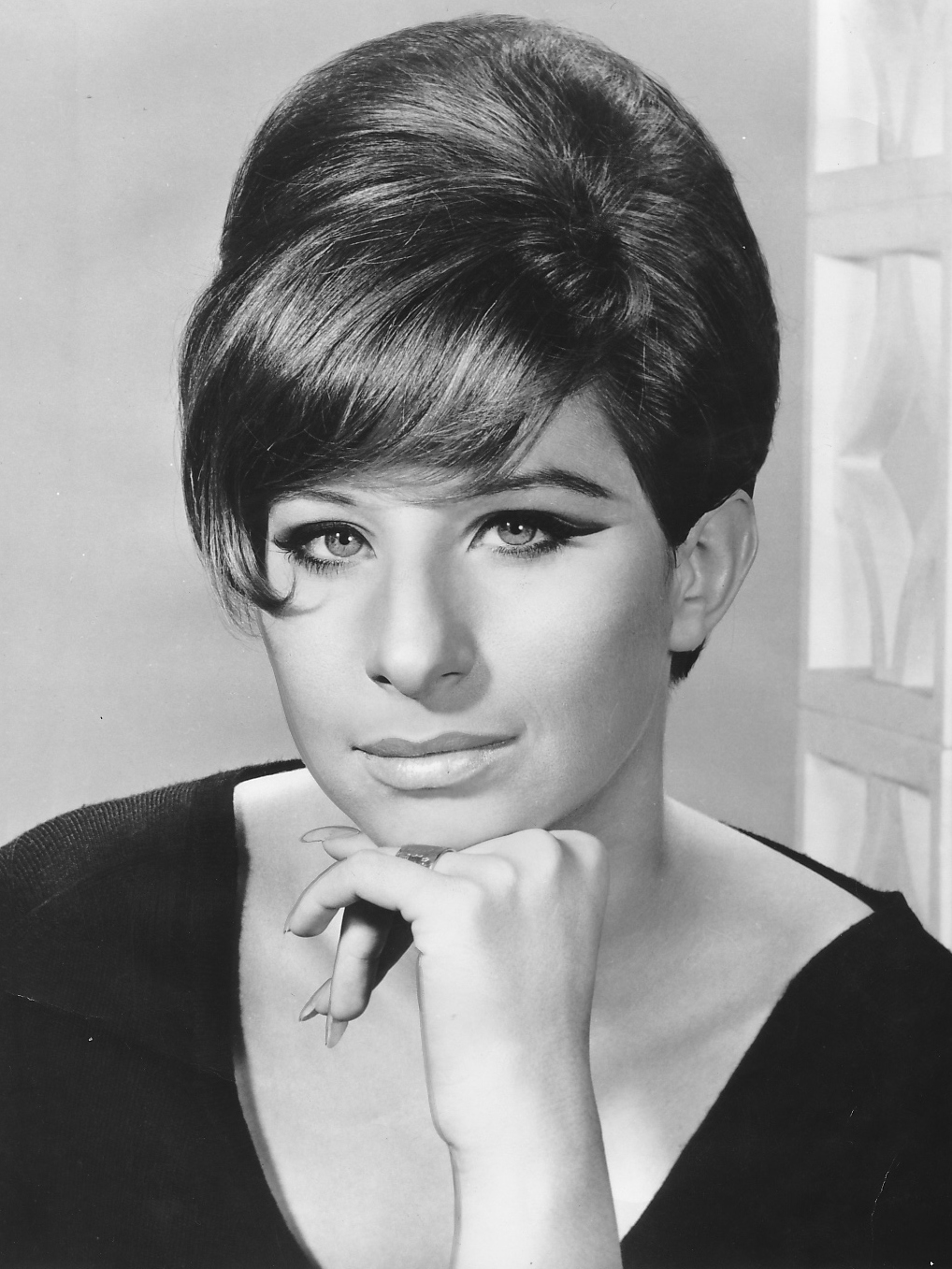
Barbra Streisand spent three weeks at number one with "The Main Event".

An asterisk (*) indicates an unpublished weekly chart due to the special double issues RPM publishes for the year-end top singles charts.

Chart history
Issue date	Title	Artist(s)	Ref.
January 6*	"Time Passages"	Al Stewart	
January 13	"Y.M.C.A."	Village People	
January 20	"I Love the Nightlife"	Alicia Bridges	
January 27	"Le Freak"	Chic	
February 3	"Too Much Heaven"	Bee Gees	
February 10	"Lotta Love"	Nicolette Larson	
February 17	"Lotta Love"	Nicolette Larson	
February 24	"I Just Fall in Love Again"	Anne Murray	
March 3	"I Just Fall in Love Again"	Anne Murray	
March 10	"I Just Fall in Love Again"	Anne Murray	
March 17	"I Just Fall in Love Again"	Anne Murray	
March 24	"Rasputin"	Boney M.	
March 31	"Da Ya Think I'm Sexy?"	Rod Stewart	
April 7	"Fire"	The Pointer Sisters	
April 14	"I Will Survive"	Gloria Gaynor	
April 21	"I Will Survive"	Gloria Gaynor	
April 28	"I Will Survive"	Gloria Gaynor	
May 5	"I Will Survive"	Gloria Gaynor	
May 12	"What a Fool Believes"	The Doobie Brothers	
May 19	"Knock on Wood"	Amii Stewart	
May 26	"Heart of Glass"	Blondie	
June 2	"Heart of Glass"	Blondie	
June 9	"Stumblin' In"	Suzi Quatro and Chris Norman	
June 16	"Reunited"	Peaches & Herb	
June 23	"Reunited"	Peaches & Herb	
June 30	"Love You Inside Out"	Bee Gees	
July 7	"Goodnight Tonight"	Wings	
July 14	"She Believes in Me"	Kenny Rogers	
July 21	"Hot Stuff"	Donna Summer	
July 28	"Shadows in the Moonlight"	Anne Murray	
August 4	"Shadows in the Moonlight"	Anne Murray	
August 11	"Ring My Bell"	Anita Ward	
August 18	"You Take My Breath Away"	Rex Smith	
August 25	"The Main Event"	Barbra Streisand	
September 1	"The Main Event"	Barbra Streisand	
September 8	"The Main Event"	Barbra Streisand	
September 15	"You're the Only One"	Dolly Parton	
September 22	"As Long as We Keep Believing"	Paul Anka	
September 29	"Rise"	Herb Alpert	
October 6	"Different Worlds"	Maureen McGovern	
October 13	"Dancin' Round and Round"	Olivia Newton-John	
October 20	"The Boss"	Diana Ross	
October 28	"I'll Never Love This Way Again"	Dionne Warwick	
November 3	"Rise"	Herb Alpert	
November 10	"Broken Hearted Me"	Anne Murray	
November 17	"Broken Hearted Me"	Anne Murray	
November 24	"You Decorated My Life"	Kenny Rogers	
December 1	"Peter Piper"	Frank Mills	
December 8	"Peter Piper"	Frank Mills	
December 15	"Until It's Time for You to Go"	Vera Lynn	
December 22	"Peter Piper"	Frank Mills	
December 29	"Babe"	Styx	
