= What a Wonderful Christmas =

Compilation album by Anne Murray
- Released: October 9, 2001
- Recorded: 1981, 88, 93, 2001
- Genre: Country, Holiday, Orchestral, Easy Listening
- Length: 1:33:10
- Label: Straightway Records
- Producer: Anne Murray; Jim Ed Norman; Steve Sexton; Tommy West

Anne Murray chronology
What a Wonderful World (1999)	What a Wonderful Christmas (2001)	Country Croonin' (2002)

Professional ratings
Review scores
Source	Rating
Allmusic	2.5/5 stars

What a Wonderful Christmas is an album by Canadian artist Anne Murray. It was released by Straightway Records on October 9, 2001. The album peaked at number 4 on the Billboard Christian Albums chart, number 6 on the Billboard Top Country Albums chart and number 83 on the Billboard 200.

== Track listing ==
Disc 1
No.	Title	Writer(s)	Length
1.	"Joy to the World"	Lowell Mason, Isaac Watts	2:09
2.	"Coventry Carol/White Christmas"	Traditional/Irving Berlin	3:43
3.	"It Came Upon the Midnight Clear"	Edmund Sears, Richard Storrs Willis	3:12
4.	"Let It Snow! Let It Snow! Let It Snow!"	Sammy Cahn, Jule Styne	2:48
5.	"Winter Wonderland"	Felix Bernard, Richard B. Smith	2:59
6.	"O Little Town of Bethlehem"	Phillips Brooks, Lewis Redner	3:10
7.	"Coventry Carol/Christmas in Killarney"	James Cavanaugh, John Redmond, Frank Weldon, Traditional	2:45
8.	"This Season Will Never Grow Old"	Rita MacNeil	3:10
9.	"Have Yourself a Merry Little Christmas"	Ralph Blane, Hugh Martin	3:14
10.	"O Come All Ye Faithful"	Frederick Oakeley, John Francis Wade	4:26
11.	"Do You Hear What I Hear?"	Noël Regney, Gloria Shayne Baker	2:48
12.	"It's Beginning to Look a Lot Like Christmas"	Meredith Willson	2:46
13.	"Sweet Little Jesus Boy"	Robert MacGimsey	3:49
14.	"I'll Be Home for Christmas"	Kim Gannon, Walter Kent, Buck Ram	3:36
Total length:			44:35

Disc 2
No.	Title	Writer(s)	Length
1.	"Jolly Old Saint Nicholas/Santa Claus Is Coming to Town"	John Frederick Coots, Haven Gillespie, Traditional	5:41
2.	"Rudolph the Red-Nosed Reindeer/Frosty the Snowman"	Johnny Marks, Steve Nelson, Jack Rollins	3:39
3.	"Away in a Manger"	Traditional	3:01
4.	"We Three Kings"	John Henry Hopkins Jr.	3:02
5.	"Silver Bells"	Ray Evans, Jay Livingston	2:44
6.	"The Little Drummer Boy"	Katherine Kennicott Davis, Henry Onorati, Harry Simeone	3:46
7.	"The First Noël"	Traditional	3:20
8.	"Go Tell It on the Mountain"	John Wesley Work Jr., Traditional	2:50
9.	"Christmas Wishes"	Art Podell, Randy Sparks	2:32
10.	"Hark! The Herald Angels Sing"	Felix Mendelssohn, Charles Wesley	2:59
11.	"Mary's Boy Child/Oh My Lord"	Jester Hairston	3:56
12.	"O Holy Night"	Adolphe Adam, John Sullivan Dwight	3:08
13.	"Coventry Carol/The Christmas Song"	Mel Tormé, Robert Wells, Traditional	3:34
14.	"Silent Night"	Franz Xaver Gruber, Joseph Mohr	4:23
Total length:			48:35

== Charts ==
=== Weekly charts ===
Chart (2001)	Peak position
US Billboard 200	83
US Christian Albums (Billboard)	4
US Top Country Albums (Billboard)	6
US Top Holiday Albums (Billboard)	5

=== Year-end charts ===
Chart (2002)	Position
Canadian Country Albums (Nielsen SoundScan)	56
US Top Country Albums (Billboard)	53
