= Somebody's Always Saying Goodbye =

Single by Anne Murray

from the album The Hottest Night of the Year
- B-side: "That'll Keep Me Dreaming"
- Released: November 1982
- Genre: Country
- Length: 3:24
- Label: Capitol
- Songwriter(s): Bob McDill
- Producer(s): Jim Ed Norman

Anne Murray singles chronology
| "Hey! Baby" (1982) | "Somebody's Always Saying Goodbye" (1982) | "A Little Good News" (1983) |

"Somebody's Always Saying Goodbye" is a song written by Bob McDill, and recorded by Canadian country music artist Anne Murray. It was released in November 1982 as the second single from her album The Hottest Night of the Year.

The single reached #7 on Billboard's Country chart and peaked at #36 Adult Contemporary. It also hit #1 on the Canadian RPM Adult Contemporary Tracks chart in early 1983.

The song also appears on Murray's 2007 album Anne Murray Duets: Friends & Legends, performed as a duet with Jann Arden.

== Chart performance ==
| Chart (1982–1983) | Peak position |
|---|---|
| Canadian RPM Country Tracks | 3 |
| Canadian RPM Adult Contemporary Tracks | 1 |
| U.S. Billboard Hot Country Singles | 7 |
| US Adult Contemporary (Billboard) | 36 |
