= Lucky Me (Anne Murray song) =

Single by Anne Murray

from the album Somebody's Waiting
- B-side: "Somebody's Waiting"
- Released: March 1980
- Genre: Country
- Length: 3:10
- Label: Capitol
- Songwriter(s): Charlie Black; Rory Bourke
- Producer(s): Jim Ed Norman

Anne Murray singles chronology
"Daydream Believer" (1980)	"Lucky Me" (1980)	"I'm Happy Just to Dance with You" (1980)

"Lucky Me" is a song written by Charlie Black and Rory Bourke, and recorded by Canadian country music artist Anne Murray. It was released in March 1980 as the first single from her album Somebody's Waiting. The song reached number 1 on the RPM Adult Contemporary Tracks chart in May 1980.

== Chart performance ==
Chart (1980)	Peak position
Canadian RPM Country Tracks	4
Canadian RPM Top Singles	58
Canadian RPM Adult Contemporary Tracks	1
US Billboard Hot Country Singles	9
US Cash Box Top 100	45
US Billboard Hot 100	42
US Adult Contemporary (Billboard)	8
