= Anne Murray's Christmas Album =

Compilation album by Anne Murray
- Released: October 7, 2008
- Recorded: 1981, 1993, 2001, June 2008
- Genre: Country
- Length: 45:38
- Label: Manhattan/EMI
- Producers: Anne Murray Jim Ed Norman Steve Sexton Tommy West

Anne Murray chronology
Duets: Friends & Legends (2007)	Anne Murray's Christmas Album (2008)

Professional ratings
Review scores
Source	Rating
Allmusic	3.5/5 stars

Anne Murray's Christmas Album is the seventh Christmas album release by Canadian Country artist Anne Murray.

The disc was released in October, 2008 through Manhattan Records, and features ten previously released cuts; four new recordings completed in 2008; and a previously unissued live recording from 2001 with Diana Krall. The four newly recorded cuts are Murray's final studio recordings, as she announced her retirement from show business in 2008. As of 2024, Murray remains in full retirement with this being her last release.

== Track listing ==
No.	Title	Length
1.	"Joy to the World"	2:09
2.	"Let It Snow! Let It Snow! Let It Snow!"	3:00
3.	"Rockin' Around the Christmas Tree^{A}"	2:06
4.	"Away in a Manger"	3:01
5.	"Silver Bells"	2:44
6.	"O Come All Ye Faithful"	4:27
7.	"Winter Wonderland"	3:13
8.	"Jingle Bell Rock^{A}"	2:18
9.	"White Christmas"	3:06
10.	"O Holy Night"	3:08
11.	"Blue Christmas^{A}"	2:29
12.	"Go Tell It on the Mountain"	2:50
13.	"Baby, It's Cold Outside^{A}" (featuring Michael Bublé)	3:05
14.	"Silent Night"	4:26
15.	"Have Yourself a Merry Little Christmas^{A}" (featuring Diana Krall)	3:35

- ^{A} Previously unreleased.

== Chart performance ==
Chart (2008)	Peak position
Canadian Albums Chart	14
U.S. Billboard Top Country Albums	35
U.S. Billboard Top Holiday Albums	21
