= In the Time It Takes =

1993 single by Beth Nielsen Chapman

Single by Beth Nielsen Chapman featuring Paul Carrack

from the album You Hold the Key
- Released: August 20, 1993
- Recorded: 1993
- Genre: Adult contemporary
- Length: 4:17
- Label: Reprise
- Songwriter: Beth Nielsen Chapman
- Producer: Jim Ed Norman

Beth Nielsen Chapman singles chronology
"The Moment You Were Mine" (1993)	"In the Time It Takes" (1993)	"Sand and Water" (1997)

Paul Carrack singles chronology
"Don't Dream It's Over" (1991)	"In the Time It Takes" (1993)	"Eyes of Blue" (1995)

"In the Time It Takes" is a song written and performed by Beth Nielsen Chapman, released as a radio-only single from her second album You Hold the Key. The song features vocals from Paul Carrack. It peaked at #25 on the Billboard Adult Contemporary Singles chart in 1993, and it stayed on the chart for 14 weeks. On the Canadian singles chart, the song spent two weeks at its peak of #34.

== Chart history ==
Chart (1993–94)	Peak position
US Adult Contemporary (Billboard)	25
Canadian RPM Top Singles	34
