= Oklahoma Crude =

Oklahoma Crude may refer to:

- Oklahoma Crude (film), a 1973 western drama
- Oklahoma Crude (indoor football), a defunct team in the U.S. National Indoor Football League
