= Back to Love =

Back to Love may refer to:

== Music ==
=== Albums ===
- Back to Love (Mr. Fingers album), 1994
- Back to Love (Beth Nielsen Chapman album), 2010
- Back to Love (Anthony Hamilton album), 2011
- Back to Love (Jolina Magdangal album), 2015
- Back to Love (Vanessa Amorosi album), 2019

=== Songs ===
- "Back to Love" (Evelyn King song), 1982
- "Back to Love" (Estelle song), 2011
- "Back to Love" (DJ Pauly D song), 2013
- "Back to Love" (Chris Brown song), 2019

== See also ==
- Back 2 Love (disambiguation)
