= Send a Little Love My Way =

Single by Anne Murray

from the album Love Song
- B-side: "Head Above the Water"
- Released: June 1973
- Genre: Country
- Length: 2:47
- Label: Capitol Records 3648
- Songwriter(s): Henry Mancini, Hal David
- Producer(s): Brian Ahern

Anne Murray singles chronology
"What About Me" (1973)	"Send a Little Love My Way" (1973)	"A Love Song" (1973)

"Send a Little Love My Way" is a song written by Henry Mancini and Hal David and performed by Anne Murray. The song reached #6 on the Canadian Adult Contemporary chart and #10 on both the Canadian country chart and the U.S. Adult Contemporary chart in 1973. The song appeared on her 1974 album, Love Song. The song was produced by Brian Ahern.

In 1973 the song was nominated for a Golden Globe Award for Best Original Song. The song was featured in Oklahoma Crude.

== Chart performance ==
=== Anne Murray ===
Chart (1973)	Peak position
Canadian RPM Country Tracks	10
Canadian RPM Top Singles	25
Canadian RPM Adult Contemporary	6
U.S. Country	79
Billboard Hot 100	72
U.S. Adult Contemporary	10
