= I'll Be Seeing You (Anne Murray album) =

Studio album by Anne Murray
- Released: October 19, 2004
- Recorded: January–August 2004
- Studios: Phase One Studios (Toronto, Ontario, Canada)
- Genre: Country
- Length: 50:09
- Label: Straightway
- Producers: Anne Murray; Tommy West

Anne Murray chronology
Country Croonin' (2002)	I'll Be Seeing You (2004)	All of Me (2005)

Professional ratings
Review scores
Source	Rating
Allmusic	3.5/5 stars

I'll Be Seeing You is the thirty-first studio album by Canadian artist Anne Murray. It was released by Straightway Records on October 19, 2004. It was Murray’s second standards album (following Croonin’ 11 years earlier) The album was re-released as All of Me in 2005 with a bonus greatest hits disc included.

== Track listing ==
No.	Title	Writer(s)	Length
1.	"All of Me"	Gerald Marks, Seymour Simons	2:57
2.	"As Time Goes By"	Herman Hupfeld	3:07
3.	"Dream a Little Dream of Me"	Fabian Andre, Gus Kahn, Wilbur Schwandt	3:02
4.	"I Wonder Who's Kissing Him Now"	Frank Adams, Will Hough, Joe Howard, Harold Orlob	3:10
5.	"I'm Gonna Sit Right Down and Write Myself a Letter"	Fred E. Ahlert, Joe Young	2:55
6.	"Over the Rainbow"	Harold Arlen, E. Y. Harburg	3:19
7.	"Twilight Time"	Artie Dunn, Al Nevins, Morty Nevins, Buck Ram	3:36
8.	"My Buddy"	Walter Donaldson, Kahn	4:12
9.	"After You've Gone"	Henry Creamer, Turner Layton	3:01
10.	"What'll I Do"	Irving Berlin	3:22
11.	"Don't Get Around Much Anymore"	Duke Ellington, Bob Russell	2:39
12.	"Smile"	Charlie Chaplin, Geoffrey Parsons, John Turner	3:44
13.	"You Made Me Love You"	James V. Monaco, Joseph McCarthy	3:17
14.	"I'll Be Seeing You"	Sammy Fain, Irving Kahal	4:04
15.	"We'll Meet Again"	Hughie Charles, Ross Parker	6:14
Total length:			52:39

== Personnel ==
- Anne Murray – vocals
- Doug Riley – acoustic piano, Hammond B3 organ
- Steve Sexton – keyboards
- Tom Szczesniak – accordion
- Bob Mann – lead guitar, rhythm guitar, acoustic guitar, electric guitar,
- Michael "Pepe" Francis – acoustic guitar, electric guitar
- Aidan Mason – acoustic guitar, electric guitar, classical guitar
- Peter Bleakney – bass
- Gary Craig – drums, percussion
- Brian Barlow – percussion, marimba, vibraphone
- Jeff Wolpert – percussion
- Bob DeAngelis – clarinet
- Vern Doerg – alto saxophone, tenor saxophone, clarinet
- Laurie Bower – trombone
- Guido Basso – trumpet, flugelhorn
- John MacLeod – trumpet
- Don Reed – fiddle
- Roman Borys – cello
- Douglas Perry – viola
- Carol Fujino – violin
- Annalee Patipatanakoon – violin
- Peter Cardinali – string quartet arrangements and conductor
- Jamie Hopkins – string copyist
- Debbie Ankeny – backing vocals
- Colina Phillips – backing vocals
- Tommy West – backing vocals
- Vivienne Williams – backing vocals

=== Production ===
- Anne Murray – producer
- Tommy West – producer
- Jeff Wolpert – recording, mixing
- George Seara – mastering
- Denise Bockus – production assistant
- Darlene Sawyer – production assistant
- Liz Stewart – production assistant
- Mystique Creative – artwork, design
- Monic Richard – photography
- Bruce Allen – management
