= The Mighty Sky =

Studio album by Beth Nielsen Chapman
- Released: October 9, 2012
- Genre: Children's music
- Label: BNC Records
- Producer: Annie Roboff, Beth Nielsen Chapman

Beth Nielsen Chapman chronology
Back To Love (2010)	The Mighty Sky (2012)	Liv On (2016)

The Mighty Sky is the tenth studio album by Beth Nielsen Chapman. It was released in the United States on October 9, 2012. It was nominated for the Grammy Award for Best Children's Music Album at the 56th Annual Grammy Awards.

== Track listing ==
All tracks composed by Beth Nielsen Chapman, Annie Roboff and Rocky Alvey

1. "The Mighty Sky” (Chapman, Alvey) – 3:47
2. "Through Hubble’s Eyes” (Chapman) – 1:41
3. "The Big Bang Boom” – 3:01
4. "The Moon” (Chapman, Alvey) – 2:42
5. "Little Big Song” – 3:19
6. "Rockin’ Little Neutron Song” – 2:05
7. "Zodiacal Zydeco” – 3:10
8. "Test, Retest and Verify” (Chapman, Alvey) – 3:00
9. "The Way We Lean” – 2:08
10. "You Can See the Blues” (Alvey) – 3:33
11. "There Is No Darkness” (Chapman, Alvey) – 2:59
