= Country Croonin' =

Studio album by Anne Murray
- Released: October 22, 2002
- Genre: Country
- Length: 100:36
- Label: Straightway Records
- Producers: Anne Murray; Tommy West

Anne Murray chronology
What a Wonderful Christmas (2001)	Country Croonin' (2002)	I'll Be Seeing You (2004)

Country Croonin' is the thirtieth studio album and an RIAA Gold-certified album by Canadian country music artist Anne Murray. It was released by Straightway Records in the fall of 2002.

The disc peaked at #13 on the Billboard Top Country Albums chart and sold over 500,000 copies in the United States alone.

== Track listing ==
Disc 1
No.	Title	Writer(s)	Length
1.	"Help Me Make It Through the Night"	Kris Kristofferson	3:54
2.	"Someday (You'll Want Me to Want You)"	Jimmie Hodges	4:01
3.	"The End of the World"	Sylvia Dee, Arthur Kent	3:51
4.	"Oh Lonesome Me"	Don Gibson	3:01
5.	"I Can't Stop Loving You"	Gibson	4:10
6.	"Me and Bobby McGee"	Fred Foster, Kristofferson	4:05
7.	"Can't Help Falling in Love"	Luigi Creatore, Hugo Peretti, George David Weiss	3:57
8.	"Let It Be Me"	Gilbert Bécaud, Manny Curtis, Pierre Delanoë	3:09
9.	"Singing the Blues"	Melvin Endsley	2:48
10.	"I Really Don't Want to Know"	Howard Barnes, Don Robertson	4:41
11.	"(Now and Then There's) A Fool Such as I"	Bill Trader	3:02
12.	"Always on My Mind"	Johnny Christopher, Mark James, Wayne Carson Thompson	3:56
13.	"('Til) I Kissed You"	Don Everly	2:40
14.	"Loving Arms"	Tom Jans	3:22
15.	"Are You Lonesome Tonight?"	Lou Handman, Roy Turk	3:22
Total length:			53:59

Disc 2
No.	Title	Writer(s)	Length
1.	"Make the World Go Away"	Hank Cochran	3:26
2.	"Anytime"	Herbert "Happy" Lawson	2:41
3.	"You Don't Know Me"	Eddy Arnold, Cindy Walker	3:59
4.	"Bye Bye Love"	Felice and Boudleaux Bryant	2:53
5.	"Vaya Con Dios (May God Be with You)"	Inez James, Buddy Pepper, Larry Russell	3:19
6.	"Take These Chains from My Heart"	Hy Heath, Fred Rose	3:07
7.	"For the Good Times"	Kristofferson	4:10
8.	"Sea of Heartbreak"	Hal David, Paul Hampton	3:13
9.	"She'll Have to Go"	Joe Allison, Audrey Allison	4:09
10.	"I'm Confessin' (That I Love You)/I'm a Fool to Care"	Ted Daffan, Doc Dougherty, Al Neiburg, Ellis Reynolds	4:16
11.	"Blue Blue Day"	Gibson	2:05
12.	"That's the Way Love Goes"	Lefty Frizzell, Sanger D. Shafer	3:20
13.	"I Fall to Pieces"	Cochran, Harlan Howard	3:10
14.	"All I Have to Do Is Dream"	Boudleaux Bryant	2:52
15.	"Tennessee Waltz"	Pee Wee King, Redd Stewart	3:04
Total length:			49:44

== Charts ==
=== Weekly charts ===
Weekly chart performance for Country Croonin'
Chart (2002)	Peak position
US Billboard 200	109
US Top Country Albums (Billboard)	13

=== Year-end charts ===
Year-end chart performance for Country Croonin'
Chart (2002)	Position
Canadian Albums (Nielsen SoundScan)	98
Canadian Country Albums (Nielsen SoundScan)	7

Chart (2003)	Position
US Top Country Albums (Billboard)	58
