= Anne Murray Duets: Friends & Legends =

Duets: Friends & Legends

Studio album by Anne Murray
- Released: November 13, 2007 (Canada); January 15, 2008 (United States)
- Recorded: 1978 (Dusty Springfield); December 14, 1996 (Anne and Celine Dion); Fall 2006–Summer 2007
- Studios: Orphan Studios (Atlanta, Georgia, USA); Blackbird Studio (Nashville, Tennessee, USA); Capitol Studios (Hollywood, California, USA); Legacy Recording Studios (New York City, New York, USA); Phase One Studios and The Orange Lounge (Toronto, Ontario, Canada)
- Genre: Country
- Length: 61:53
- Label: Manhattan
- Producers: Robert "Mutt" Lange; Anne Murray; Phil Ramone

Anne Murray chronology
All of Me (2005)	Duets: Friends & Legends (2007)	Anne Murray's Christmas Album (2008)

Professional ratings
Review scores
Source	Rating
Allmusic	4/5 stars

Duets: Friends & Legends is the thirty-second studio album by Canadian country artist Anne Murray. The album features seventeen of Murray's best-known songs re-recorded as duets with her favourite female singers. While the record mostly consists of new studio tracks, Murray's duet with Celine Dion on "When I Fall in Love" was taken from a 1996 TV special. The late Dusty Springfield's vocal on "I Just Fall in Love Again" was lifted from Springfield's 1978 recording of the track.

The album was released in Canada on November 13, 2007, where it reached #4 on the Canadian Albums Chart and has since been certified 2× Platinum (200,000 albums sold) in that country. It received two nominations at the 2008 Juno Awards (Album of the Year and Pop Album of the Year), although it was originally omitted from the Album of the Year category after a calculation error.

Anne Murray - Friends & Legends is also the title of a one-hour television special produced for CBC Television by Out to See Entertainment Inc. The show features duets by Anne Murray with her daughter Dawn Langstroth, Jann Arden and various other artists.

In the United States, the album was released on January 15, 2008, and peaked at #42 on the Billboard 200 as well as #8 on the Top Country Albums chart. As of 2016, the album has sold approximately 300,000 copies in the United States.

This is Murray's final album of wholly new recordings. The following year, Murray made her final studio recordings—four new tracks for the compilation Anne Murray's Christmas Album, which consisted mostly of previously released material.

== Tour ==
To promote the album, Murray embarked on the 'Coast-to-Coast – One Last Time' tour.

== Track listing ==
No.	Title	Writer(s)	Duet partner	Length
1.	"Danny's Song"	Kenny Loggins	Martina McBride	4:00
2.	"I Just Fall in Love Again"	Steve Dorff, Larry Herbstritt, Harry Lloyd, Gloria Sklerov	Dusty Springfield	3:14
3.	"Another Pot O' Tea"	Paul Grady	Emmylou Harris	3:34
4.	"Daydream Believer"	John Stewart	Nelly Furtado	2:51
5.	"Somebody's Always Saying Goodbye"	Bob McDill	Jann Arden	4:21
6.	"Song for the Mira"	Allister MacGillivray	Celtic Woman	3:52
7.	"Time Don't Run Out on Me"	Gerry Goffin, Carole King	Carole King	3:30
8.	"Cotton Jenny"	Gordon Lightfoot	Olivia Newton-John	3:23
9.	"A Love Song"	Dona Lyn George, Loggins	k.d. lang	3:07
10.	"You Needed Me"	Randy Goodrum	Shania Twain	3:42
11.	"Nobody Loves Me Like You Do"	James P. Duane, Pamela Phillips	Dawn Langstroth	4:04
12.	"You Won't See Me"	John Lennon, Paul McCartney	Shelby Lynne	4:17
13.	"Could I Have This Dance"	Wayland Holyfield, Bob House	Amy Grant	3:18
14.	"A Little Good News"	Charlie Black, Rory Michael Bourke, Tommy Rocco	Indigo Girls	3:58
15.	"Snowbird"	Gene MacLellan	Sarah Brightman	2:15
16.	"When I Fall in Love" (live)	Edward Heyman, Victor Young	Celine Dion	3:50
17.	"Si Jamais Je Te Revois (If I Ever See You Again)"	Bill Rice, Sharon Rice	Isabelle Boulay	4:37
Total length:				61:53

== Personnel ==
=== Musicians ===
Rhythm Section

- Steve Nathan – keyboards (1–3)
- Lou Pomanti – acoustic piano (4–7, 17), electric piano (4–7, 17), organ (4–7, 17)
- Doug Riley – keyboards (4–7, 17)
- Jim Cox – keyboards (8–12), rhythm arrangements (8–12)
- Rob Mathes – keyboards (13–15), Hammond B3 organ (13–15), acoustic guitar (13–15), 12-string guitar (13–15)
- Chris Caswell – additional keyboards (13–15)
- Gil Goldstein – accordion (13–15)
- Brian Gatto – keyboards (16)
- Steve Sexton – keyboards (16)
- Brent Mason – electric guitar (1–3)
- Biff Watson – acoustic guitar (1–3)
- Michael 'Pepe' Francis – guitars (4–7, 17)
- Dean Parks – guitars (8–12)
- Billy Masters – electric guitar (13–15)
- Georges Hébert – guitars (16)
- Aidan Mason – guitars (16)
- Michael Rhodes – bass (1–3)
- Peter Cardinali – bass (4–7, 17)
- Kevin Axt – bass (8, 9)
- David Finck – bass (13–15)
- Peter Bleakney – bass (16)
- Eddie Bayers – drums (1–3)
- Barry Keane – drums (4–7), percussion (4–7)
- Gregg Field – drums (8–12)
- Shawn Pelton – drums (13–15)
- Gary Craig – drums (16)

Brass and Woodwinds

- Gil Goldstein – arrangements and conductor
- Rob Mathes – arrangements and conductor
- Andy Snitzer – alto saxophone
- George Flynn – bass trombone
- Birch Johnson – tenor trombone
- Tony Kadleck – trumpet
- Jeff Kievit – trumpet
- Chris Hall – tuba
- Katherine Fink – alto flute
- Liz Mann – alto flute
- Pamela Sklar – bass flute
- David Weiss – bass flute
- Virgil Blackwell – bass clarinet
- Diane Lesser – English horn
- Bob Carlisle – French horn
- Philip Myers – French horn

String Section

- Gil Goldstein – arrangements and conductor
- Rob Mathes – arrangements and conductor
- Jill Dell'Abate – contractor
- Elena Barere – concertmaster

Cello

- Diane Barere
- Jeanne LeBlanc
- Richard Locker

Viola

- Irene Breslaw
- Desiree Elsevier
- Vincent Lionti
- Craig Mumm

Violin

- Abe Appleman
- Elena Barere
- Eva Burmeister
- David Chan
- Enrico DiCecco
- Jonathan Dinklage
- Katherine Fong
- Ann Leathers
- Laura McGinniss
- Catherine Ro
- Ricky Sortomme
- Sylvia Danburg Vlope
- Carol Webb
- Hae Young Ham

=== Backing Vocals ===
- Dawn Langstroth (3, 10)
- Will Langstroth (10)
- Anne Murray (10)

Choir on Track 17

- Peter Cardinali
- Michael Francis
- Barry Keane
- Nathan Moore
- Bruno Moynie
- Raine Munro
- Jeff Pelletier
- Lou Pomanti
- Anastasia Saradoc
- Qadi Soraya

== Production ==
- Phil Ramone – producer (Tracks 1–15 & 17)
- Robert John "Mutt" Lange – vocal producer for Shania Twain (Track 10)
- Anne Murray – producer (Track 16)
- Steve Sexton – pre-production
- Portia Gauthier – production assistance
- Jill Dell'Abate – production manager
- Patrick Duffy – art direction, design
- Monic Richard – photography
- P'tricia – hair, manicure
- Dany Cournoyer – make-up
- Bruce Allen – management
- Larry LeBlanc – liner notes

Technical credits

- Bob Ludwig – mastering at Gateway Mastering (Portland, Maine, USA)
- Jeff Balding – recording
- Frank Filipetti – recording, brass/string/woodwind recording, mixing
- Al Schmitt – recording
- Jeff Wolpert – recording
- Olle Romo – vocal recording (Shania Twain on Track 10)
- George Seara – additional vocal engineer (Track 13)
- Glenn Matullo – vocal recording (Indigo Girls on Track 14)
- Peter Hamilton – recording (Track 16)
- Doug McClement – recording (Track 16)
- Kevin Doyle – mixing (Track 16)
- Luiz Breves – assistant engineer
- Allen Ditto – assistant engineer
- Steve Genewick – assistant engineer, Pro Tools operator
- Don Goodrick – assistant engineer
- Chris Jennings – assistant engineer
- Greg Kolchinsky – assistant engineer
- Missy Webb – assistant engineer, mix assistant

== Charts ==
=== Weekly charts ===
Chart (2007–2008)	Peak position
Canadian Albums (Billboard)	3
US Billboard 200	42
US Top Country Albums (Billboard)	8

=== Year-end charts ===
Chart (2008)	Position
Canadian Albums (Billboard)	6
US Top Country Albums (Billboard)	61
