= You Hold the Key =

Studio album by Beth Nielsen Chapman
- Released: 1993
- Genre: Country pop
- Length: 49:15
- Label: Reprise
- Producer: Jim Ed Norman

Beth Nielsen Chapman chronology
Beth Nielsen Chapman (1990)	You Hold the Key (1993)	Sand and Water (1997)

Professional ratings
Review scores
Source	Rating
Allmusic	4/5 stars

You Hold the Key is Beth Nielsen Chapman's third album ('Hearing it first' was her first, in 1980). It was released in 1993 on Reprise Records, and features a duet with British singer-songwriter and Mike + The Mechanics vocalist/keyboardist Paul Carrack, called "In the Time It Takes".

The title of this album, as well as the song title it is named after, are from a line in the song "Open Your Heart", by US singer Madonna.

== Track listing ==
All tracks are written by Beth Nielsen Chapman, except where indicated.

No.	Title	Writer(s)	Length
1.	"I Don't Know"		3:57
2.	"You Hold the Key"		4:06
3.	"Dance with Me Slow"		4:18
4.	"Say It to Me Now"		4:48
5.	"When I Feel This Way"		4:20
6.	"Rage on Rage"		4:19
7.	"Only So Many Tears"		4:08
8.	"In the Time It Takes" (Duet with Paul Carrack)		4:18
9.	"You Say You Will"	Beth Nielsen Chapman; Verlon Thompson	4:20
10.	"The Moment You Were Mine"	Beth Nielsen Chapman; Steve Dorff	3:31
11.	"Faithful Heart"	Beth Nielsen Chapman; Twila Paris	3:31
12.	"Dancer to the Drum"		3:39
Total length:			49:15

== Production ==
- Produced By Frank Filipetti, Paul Samwell-Smith & Jim Ed Norman
- Associate Producers: Beth Nielsen Chapman, Danny Kee, Ivy Skoff
- Recorded & Engineered By Keith Grant & Robert Tassi
- Second Engineers: Donny Bott, Mark Capps, Robert Charles, Jon Dickson, Shawn McLean, Chris Ludwinsky, Fred Mercer, Adrian Moore, Brian Pollack, Thom Russo & Ben Wallach
- Mixed By Frank Filipetti & Chris Lord-Alge
- Mastered By Ted Jensen

== Personnel ==
- Beth Nielsen Chapman - vocals, acoustic and electric guitars, keyboards, programming
- Russ Kunkel, Paul Leim - drums
- Tom Roady - percussion
- Jimmy Bralower - drum programming
- Martin Allcock, Will Lee, Michael Rhodes, Leland Sklar - bass guitar
- Mark Casstevens, Andrew Gold, Kenny Greenberg, Josh Leo, Simon Nicol, Jim Ryan - guitar
- Nick Bicat, Robbie Buchanan, Teese Gohl, Dave Innis, Mike Lawler, Matt Rollings - keyboards, programming
- Jim Horn, Andy Snitzer - saxophone
- Martin Allcock - dulcimer
- Rod McGaha - trumpet
- Kathryn Trickell - pipes
- Miriam Keogh - harp
- London Symphony Orchestra - strings
