= The Hottest Night of the Year =

Studio album by Anne Murray
- Released: June 3, 1982
- Studios: Producers Workshop (Los Angeles, California); Audio Media (Nashville, Tennessee); Eastern Sound (Toronto, Ontario, Canada)
- Genre: Country
- Length: 31:38
- Label: Capitol
- Producer: Jim Ed Norman

Anne Murray chronology
Christmas Wishes (1981)	The Hottest Night of the Year (1982)	A Little Good News (1983)

Singles from The Hottest Night of the Year
- 1. "Hey! Baby" Released: May 1982; 2. "Somebody's Always Saying Goodbye" Released: November 1982

The Hottest Night of the Year is the nineteenth studio album by Canadian country pop artist Anne Murray. It was released by Capitol Records in 1982. The album reached #29 on Billboard's Country albums chart and peaked at #90 on the Billboard Pop albums chart. Its US sales were estimated at 200,000 copies.

The album's first single, a cover of the 1961 Bruce Channel hit "Hey! Baby" was a U.S. country top-ten single, reaching number 7; the following up single, "Somebody's Always Saying Goodbye", also peaked at number 7 on the country singles chart. Both singles topped the Canadian Country singles charts.

== Track listing ==
No.	Title	Writer(s)	Length
1.	"The Hottest Night of the Year"	Kerry Chater, Lane Brody, Tom Campbell	2:56
2.	"Fallin' in Love (Fallin' Apart)"	Harry Shannon, Mitch Johnson	3:39
3.	"Somebody's Always Saying Goodbye"	Bob McDill	3:24
4.	"Easy Does It"	Chater, Campbell	3:40
5.	"Hey! Baby"	Bruce Channel, Margaret Cobb	2:32
6.	"Ain't No Way to Rise Above (Fallin' in Love)"	Chater, Patti Dahlstrom, Rory Bourke	3:21
7.	"Heart on the Line"	Don Stalker, Steve Berg, Steve Dorff	2:36
8.	"They Don't Call It Magic for Nothing"	Charlie Black, Molly Ann Leikin	2:42
9.	"That'll Keep Me Dreamin'"	Black, Leikin	2:43
10.	"Song for the Mira"	Allistar MacGillivray	4:05

== Personnel ==
- Anne Murray – lead vocals, backing vocals
- Brian Whitcomb – electric piano (1), acoustic piano (2, 8, 9)
- Lance Ong – synthesizers (1, 2)
- Doug Riley – synthesizers (1), organ (3), keyboards (4–7, 10)
- Bobby Ogdin – acoustic piano (3)
- Dennis Burnside – electric piano (3)
- Mike "Pepe" Francis – electric guitar (1, 2, 8), guitars (4, 6, 7, 10)
- John Hug – electric guitar (1, 2, 8, 9), acoustic guitar (8)
- Fred Tackett – acoustic guitar (1, 2, 8, 9)
- Rafe Van Hoy – acoustic guitar (3)
- Paul Worley – acoustic guitar (3), electric guitar (3)
- Bob Mann – guitars (4–7, 10)
- Brian Russell – guitars (5)
- Sonny Garrish – steel guitar (3)
- Ben Mink – mandolin (10), fiddle (10)
- Leland Sklar – bass (1, 2, 8, 9)
- Joe Osborn – bass (3)
- Tom Szczesniak – bass (4–7, 10)
- Mike Botts – drums (1, 2, 8, 9)
- Eddie Bayers – drums (3)
- Barry Keane – drums (4–7, 10)
- Steve Forman – percussion (1, 2, 8)
- Dick Smith – percussion (1, 2, 4, 6–8)
- Earl Seymour – baritone saxophone (6)
- Vern Dorge – tenor saxophone (6)
- Butch Wantanabe – trombone (6)
- Guido Basso – trumpet (6)
- Charlie Gray – trumpet (6)
- Peter Cardinali – horn arrangements and conductor (6)
- Rick Wilkins – string arrangements and conductor (3, 4, 10)
- Alan Broadbent – string arrangements and conductor (8, 9)
- Glenn Grab – string contractor (3, 4, 8–10)
- Bill Richards – string contractor (3, 4, 8–10)
- Bruce Murray – backing vocals
- Deborah Schaal Greimann – backing vocals

=== Production ===
- Balmur Ltd. – executive producers
- Jim Ed Norman – producer
- Ken Friesen – recording, mixing
- Marshall Morgan – recording
- Eric Prestidge – recording
- Tom Henderson – recording assistant
- Ben Rodgers – recording assistant
- John Rosenthal – recording assistant
- Ken Perry – mastering at Capitol Mastering (Hollywood, California)
- Paul Cade – art direction, design, illustration
- Bob Karman – illustration
- Bill King – photography
- Ted Larson – lettering
- George Abbott – make-up artist
- Shelly Yakimov – hair stylist

== Chart performance ==
Chart (1982)	Peak position
Canadian RPM Top Albums	70
U.S. Billboard Top Country Albums	29
U.S. Billboard 200	90
