= Son of a Rotten Gambler =

Single by Anne Murray

from the album Love Song
- A-side: "Just One Look"
- Released: September 1974
- Genre: Country
- Length: 3:06
- Label: Capitol Nashville
- Songwriter: Chip Taylor
- Producer: Brian Ahern

Anne Murray singles chronology
"He Thinks I Still Care" (1974)	"Son of a Rotten Gambler" (1974)	"You Won't See Me" (1974)

"Son of a Rotten Gambler" is a song written by Chip Taylor and performed by Anne Murray. The song reached No. 1 on the Canadian Adult Contemporary chart, #3 on the Canadian Country chart, and #5 on the U.S. Country chart in 1974. The song appeared on her 1974 album, Love Song. The song was produced by Brian Ahern.

== Other versions ==
- The Hollies released a version of the song in 1974, It reached #10 in New Zealand.
- Emmylou Harris released a version in 1981 on her album, Cimarron.

== Chart performance ==
=== Anne Murray ===
Chart (1974)	Peak position
Canadian RPM Country Tracks	3
Canadian RPM Adult Contemporary	1
U.S. Country	5
