= Beth Nielsen Chapman (album) =

Studio album by Beth Nielsen Chapman
- Released: 25 September 1990
- Studio: Javelina (Nashville, Tennessee); 16th Avenue Sound (Nashville, Tennessee); The Loft (Nashville, Tennessee); Digital Recorders; Mastermix; Masterphonics (Nashville, Tennessee); Alpha Studios; ACME Studios; Studio 55 (Los Angeles, California); Westlake (Los Angeles, California); Wisseloord (Netherlands)
- Genre: Country
- Length: 54:59
- Label: Reprise
- Producer: Jim Ed Norman, Roscoe Beck, David Austin

Beth Nielsen Chapman chronology
Beth Nielsen Chapman (1990)	You Hold the Key (1993)

Professional ratings
Review scores
Source	Rating
AllMusic	link

Beth Nielsen Chapman is the second album by singer-songwriter Beth Nielsen Chapman.

== Track listing ==
All tracks composed by Beth Nielsen Chapman; except where indicated

1. "Life Holds On"
2. "No System for Love"
3. "I Keep Coming Back to You" (Chapman, William Lloyd)
4. "Walk My Way" (Chapman, David Austin)
5. "All I Have" (Chapman, Eric Kaz)
6. "Child Again"
7. "Take It as It Comes"
8. "Down on My Knees"
9. "Avalanche"
10. "That's the Easy Part"
11. "Emily"
12. "Years"

== Personnel ==
- Beth Nielsen Chapman – vocals, acoustic guitar, piano, keyboards
- Bill Hinds, Bill Lloyd, Dean Parks, David Grissom, John Themis, Steve Gibson, Mitchell Watkins, Michael Landau, John Willis – guitar
- Mark Casstevens – mandolin, acoustic guitar
- Michael Rhodes, Leland Sklar, Paul Powell, Glenn Worf, Roscoe Beck, Craig Nelson, Edgar Meyer, Dee Murray – bass
- Sneaky Pete Kleinow – pedal steel
- John Barlow Jarvis, Randy Kerber, Matt Rollings – piano
- Phil Naish, Larry Steelman, Judd Miller – synthesizer
- David Collard – keyboards
- Paul Leim, Russ Kunkel – drums
- Tom Roady, Lenny Castro, Danny Cummings, Paulinho da Costa – percussion
- T. Nick Charles – triangle
- Joel Derouin – violin
- Bobby Taylor – oboe
- David Austin – drum programming
- Arnold McCuller, Bill Champlin, Tommy Funderbunk – backing vocals
- Nick DeCaro – string arranger, conductor
- Bruce Dukov – concertmaster
- John Casado – design, photography

== Charts ==
Chart performance for Beth Nielsen Chapman
Chart (1992)	Peak position
Australian Albums (ARIA)	75
