= Back 2 Love =

Back 2 Love may refer to:

== Music ==
- Back 2 Love (Rahat Fateh Ali Khan album), 2014
- "Back 2 Love" (Sammie song), 2006
- "Back 2 Love" (Kelly Price song), 2014
- "Back 2 Love" (Dave Audé and JVMIE song), 2017

== See also ==
- Back to Love (disambiguation)
