= Sand and Water =

Studio album by Beth Nielsen Chapman
- Released: July 15, 1997
- Genre: Country
- Length: 43:40
- Label: Reprise
- Producer: Rodney Crowell, Beth Nielsen Chapman

Beth Nielsen Chapman chronology
| You Hold the Key (1993) | Sand and Water (1997) | Greatest Hits (1999) |

Professional ratings
Review scores
| Source | Rating |
|---|---|
| AllMusic | 4/5 stars |

Sand and Water is the fourth studio album by American singer-songwriter Beth Nielsen Chapman. It was released in 1997 via Reprise Records. The title track was the only single released, peaking at number 22 on Hot Adult Contemporary Tracks and number 2 on Bubbling Under Hot 100. Included on the album is "Happy Girl", which was later released as a single by Martina McBride in 1998.

== Critical reception ==
Thom Owens of AllMusic gives Sand and Water 4 out of a possible 5 stars and writes, "Although the arrangements on Sand and Water are slicker than anything on Beth Nielsen Chapman's previous albums, boasting everything from country to pop influences, her songwriting remains incisive, melodic and altogether striking, resulting in another stunningly accomplished record."

== Track listing ==
All tracks are written by Beth Nielsen Chapman except where noted otherwise.

| No. | Title | Writer(s) | Length |
|---|---|---|---|
| 1. | "The Color of Roses" | Beth Nielsen Chapman; Matt Rollings | 4:50 |
| 2. | "Beyond the Blue" | Chapman; Gary Nicholson | 4:58 |
| 3. | "All the Time in the World" | Chapman; Bill Lloyd | 3:44 |
| 4. | "Sand and Water" | | 4:09 |
| 5. | "Fair Enough" | Chapman; Dominic Miller; Kevin Savigar | 3:40 |
| 6. | "Seven Shades of Blue" | | 4:25 |
| 7. | "Happy Girl" | Chapman; Annie Roboff | 3:32 |
| 8. | "No One Knows but You" | | 4:43 |
| 9. | "Heads Up for the Wrecking Ball" | | 3:58 |
| 10. | "Say Goodnight" | Chapman; Joe Henry | 5:41 |
| Total length: | | | 43:40 |

== Personnel ==
- Beth Nielsen Chapman – vocals, keyboards, acoustic guitar, electric slide dulcimer, slide whistle
- Matt Rollings – piano
- Barry Walsh – piano
- Kevin Savigar – piano
- Steve Nathan – keyboards
- Mike Utley – Hammond organ
- Tim Lauer – accordion
- Annie Roboff – bandoneon
- Steuart Smith – electric guitar, gut string electric & acoustic guitars
- Pat Buchanan – electric guitar
- Larry Chaney – electric guitar
- Dominic Miller – gut string guitars
- Bonnie Raitt – dobro, electric slide guitar, guest vocalist
- Michael McDonald – guest vocalist (Seven Shades of Blue)
- Sam Bush – mandolin
- Jonathan Yudkin – mandolin
- Dave Pomeroy – bass
- Michael Rhodes – bass
- Tommy Simms – bass
- Mike Haynes – trumpet
- Tom McAnich – French horn
- Jelly Roll Johnson – harmonica
- Bobby Taylor – oboe
- Jim Keltner – drums
- Brian Barnett – drums, hand drums
- Paul Leim – drums, percussion
- Kim Fleming - background vocals
- Kirby Shelstad – hand drums, percussion, drum program
- Bill Lloyd – background vocals
- Jim Ed Norman – executive producer

Track information and credits verified from Discogs, AllMusic, and the album's liner notes.

== Charts ==
| Chart (1997) | Peak position |
|---|---|
| Australian Albums (ARIA) | 155 |
| US Heatseekers Albums (Billboard) | 30 |
