= A Country Collection =

Greatest hits album by Anne Murray
- Released: January 1980
- Recorded: 1978–1980
- Studios: Eastern Sound (Toronto, Ontario, Canada)
- Genre: Country
- Length: 31:11
- Label: Capitol
- Producer: Jim Ed Norman

Anne Murray chronology
Somebody's Waiting (1980)	A Country Collection (1980)	Anne Murray's Greatest Hits (1980)

A Country Collection is a compilation album by Anne Murray issued by Capitol Records in 1980. It is a collection of ten songs, nine of which were taken from albums released between 1978 and 1980, with one additional song, "Do You Think Of Me?", newly recorded for the album.

Unlike her then forthcoming Greatest Hits collection, which was composed mainly of Murray's chart hits, A Country Collection focused primarily on album cuts and lesser known material. The album peaked at #73 on the Billboard 200 and #7 on the Top Country Albums chart. It sold approximately 100,000 copies in the United States.

== Track listing ==
No.	Title	Writer(s)	Length
1.	"Walk Right Back"	Sonny Curtis	2:38
2.	"For No Reason At All"	Barry Mann	2:47
3.	"(He Can't Help It If) He's Not You"	Steve Gillette	3:09
4.	"We Don't Make Love Anymore"	Kenny Rogers, Michael Gordon	3:49
5.	"Tennessee Waltz"	Pee Wee King, Redd Stewart	2:45
6.	"Let's Keep It That Way"	Curly Putman, Rafe Van Hoy	3:27
7.	"Wintery Feeling"	Jesse Winchester	3:53
8.	"Do You Think of Me?"	Sandy Ross	3:38
9.	"Just to Feel This Love from You"	Jackie DeShannon, Dean MacDougall	3:05
10.	"Heaven is Here"	Gene MacLellan	2:00

== Personnel ==
Musicians

- Anne Murray – vocals, backing vocals
- Pat Riccio Jr. – keyboards
- Doug Riley – keyboards (1–6, 8–10)
- Brian Gatto – keyboards (7)
- John Hug – guitars (1–6, 8–10)
- Bob Mann – guitars (1–6, 8–10)
- Aidan Mason – guitars
- Jim Pirie – guitars (1–6, 8–10)
- Brian Russell – guitars
- Bob Lucier – steel guitar
- JayDee Maness – steel guitar
- Tom Szczesniak – bass (1–6, 8–10)
- Peter Cardinali – bass (7)
- Barry Keane – drums (1–6, 8–10), percussion
- Jørn Andersen – drums (7)
- Bruce Murray – backing vocals
- Deborah Schaal – backing vocals

Music arrangements

- Rick Wilkins – arrangements and conductor (2, 3, 8, 9)
- Doug Riley – arrangements and conductor (4–6)
- Peter Cardinali – arrangements and conductor (7)

== Production ==
- Balmur Limited – executive producers
- Jim Ed Norman – producer
- Ken Friesen – engineer
- Peter Holcomb – assistant engineer
- Michael Jackson – assistant engineer
- Tim McCauley – assistant engineer
- Ken Perry – mastering at Capitol Mastering (Hollywood, California, USA)
- Gord Marci – photography
- Leonard T. Rambeau for Balmur Limited – management

== Chart performance ==
Chart (1980)	Peak position
Canada Country Albums/CDs (RPM)	2
US Top Country Albums (Billboard)	7
US Billboard 200	73
