= Somebody's Waiting =

Studio album by Anne Murray
- Released: March 1980
- Studios: Eastern Sound (Toronto, Ontario, Canada)
- Genre: Country
- Length: 34:19
- Label: Capitol
- Producer: Jim Ed Norman

Anne Murray chronology
I'll Always Love You (1979)	Somebody's Waiting (1980)	A Country Collection (1980)

Singles from Somebody's Waiting
- 1. "Lucky Me" Released: March 1980; 2. "I'm Happy Just to Dance With You" Released: June 1980

Somebody's Waiting is the seventeenth studio album by Canadian country pop artist Anne Murray, released in March 1980 via Capitol Records. The album charted lower in the U.S. than most of Murray's other releases from the same period, peaking at number 15 on the Billboard Country Albums chart and number 88 on the Billboard Pop Albums chart. In Murray's native Canada, it reached number 32.

The album's first single. "Lucky Me", reached the U.S. country Top Ten, peaking at number 9; it also reached number 42 on the U.S. pop singles charts. A second single, a cover of the Beatles' "I'm Happy Just to Dance With You", made the country Top Thirty, and reached number 64 on the Hot 100 chart.

The song, "The French Waltz", was later recorded by Art Garfunkel on his 1981 album, Scissors Cut.

== Critical reception ==
Billboard's reviewer praised Jim Ed Norman's production by saying that it "suited exactly to her warm vocal ambiance; imaginative musical flourishes show up all through this fine package". He also noted that on this LP Murray is "back to doing what she does best: wrapping her voice around a pleasant, well-chosen variety of tunes with ballads predominant throughout."

== Track listing ==
No.	Title	Writer(s)	Length
1.	"Lucky Me"	Charlie Black, Rory Bourke	3:06
2.	"You Set My Dreams to Music"	Molly Ann Leikin, Steve Dorff	2:39
3.	"What's Forever For"	Rafe Van Hoy	3:36
4.	"Do You Think of Me"	Sandy Ross	3:38
5.	"The French Waltz"	Adam Mitchell	4:08
6.	"I'm Happy Just to Dance With You"	John Lennon, Paul McCartney	3:51
7.	"Moon Over Brooklyn"	Jimmy Lott, Alan Miles	3:56
8.	"Nevertheless (I'm in Love With You)"	Harry Ruby, Bert Kalmar	3:16
9.	"Beginning to Feel Like Home"	Colleen Peterson	2:43
10.	"Somebody's Waiting"	Aidan Mason, Gordon Adams	3:26

== Personnel ==
Musicians

- Anne Murray – lead vocals, backing vocals
- Brian Gatto – keyboards (1, 3, 5, 6), accordion (5)
- Pat Riccio Jr. – keyboards (1–6, 9, 10)
- Doug Riley – keyboards (1–4, 7, 8, 10)
- Bob Mann – guitars (1–6, 10)
- Brian Russell – guitars (1–3, 5, 6, 9, 10)
- Jim Pirie – guitars (4)
- Aidan Mason – guitars (6)
- Bob Lucier – steel guitar (3, 4, 8)
- Jack Zaza – mandolin (5)
- Tom Szczesniak – bass (1–5, 8–10)
- Peter Cardinali – bass (6)
- Barry Keane – drums (1–5, 8–10)
- Jørn Anderson – drums (6)
- Michael Brecker – saxophone (6, 7)
- Charlie McCoy – harmonica (8)
- Bruce Murray – backing vocals
- Debbie Schaal – backing vocals

Music arrangements

- Rick Wilkins – horn and string arrangements (1, 2, 4, 7–10), conductor (1, 2, 4, 7–10)
- Peter Cardinali – horn and string arrangements (3, 5, 6), conductor (3, 5, 6),

== Production ==
- Balmur Ltd. – executive producers
- Jim Ed Norman – producer
- Ken Friesen – engineer
- Peter Holcomb – assistant engineer
- Ken Perry – mastering at Capitol Mastering (Hollywood, California, USA)
- Paul Cade – art direction, design
- Gord Marci – photography

== Chart performance ==
Chart (1980)	Peak position
Canadian RPM Country Albums	1
Canadian RPM Top Albums	32
Australia (Kent Music Report)	61
U.S. Billboard Top Country Albums	15
U.S. Billboard 200	88
