= Back to Love (Beth Nielsen Chapman album) =

Studio album by Beth Nielsen Chapman
- Released: January 25, 2010
- Genre: AC
- Length: 40:34
- Label: BNC Records
- Producer: Annie Roboff

Beth Nielsen Chapman chronology
Prism (2007)	Back to Love (2010)	The Mighty Sky (2012)

Back to Love is the ninth studio album by Beth Nielsen Chapman. It was released in the United Kingdom on January 24, 2010 and in the United States on May 25, 2010. The song "How We Love" was covered by Joe McElderry in 2012 for his fourth studio album, Here's What I Believe.

== Track listing ==
1. "Hallelujah" (Beth Nielsen Chapman, Darrell Scott) – 4:14
2. "I Can See Me Loving You" (Chapman, Scott) – 3:33
3. "Even As It All Goes By" (Chapman, Annie Roboff) – 3:10
4. "How We Love" (Chapman) – 3:55
5. "I Need You Love" (Chapman) – 3:50
6. "More Than Love" (Chapman, Danny Flowers) – 3:57
7. "Happiness" (Chapman) – 3:02
8. "I'll Give My Heart" (Chapman, Benmont Tench) – 3:14
9. "Shadows" (Chapman) – 3:57
10. "Peace" (Chapman, Michael McDonald) – 3:40
11. "The Path of Love" (Chapman) – 4:02

== Personnel ==
- Martin Allcock – bass
- David Angell – violin
- Monisa Angell – viola
- Carrie Bailey – violin
- Zeneba Bowers – violin
- Nick Brofy – loop programming
- Pat Buchanan – electric guitar
- Judith Burrows – art direction, photography
- Victor Caldwell – bass
- John Catchings – cello
- Seanad Chang – viola
- Beth Nielsen Chapman – bouzouki, engineer, guitar, organ, piano, piano engineer, producer, vocal engineer, vocals
- Gary Cirimelli – engineer
- Phil Cunningham – box, whistle
- Janet Darnall – violin
- David Davidson – violin
- Chris Farrell – viola
- Danny Flowers – guitar, 12 string guitar, Telecaster
- Brian Foraker – mastering
- Jim Grosjean – viola
- Erin Hall – violin
- Carolyn Huebel – violin
- Craig Krampf – drums, percussion
- Anthony LaMarchina – cello
- David Leonard – engineer, mixing, string engineer
- Gary Malkin – piano
- Carl Marsh – conductor, horn arrangements, string arrangements
- Michael McDonald – piano
- Adam Muñoz – piano engineer, vocal engineer
- Joe Murphy – euphonium, trombone, tuba
- Eilidh Patterson – backing vocals
- Dave Polmeroy – bass
- Brian Pruitt – drums, percussion
- John Ragusa – piccolo, trumpet
- Sari Reist – cello
- Annie Roboff – producer, Wurlitzer
- Andrew Scheps – piano engineer, vocal engineer
- David Schober – string engineer
- Darrell Scott – bouzouki, guitar, acoustic guitar, electric guitar, mandolin, slide guitar, soloist, backing vocals
- Pam Sixfin – violin
- Greg Strizek – engineer
- Heather Sturm – engineer
- Benmont Tench – piano
- Wei Tsun Chang – violin
- Felix Wang – cello
- Don Ward – design
- Karen Winkelmann – string contractor, violin
