= New Kind of Feeling =

Studio album by Anne Murray
- Released: 1979
- Studios: Eastern Sound (Toronto, Ontario, Canada)
- Genres: Adult contemporary; country; pop
- Length: 30:35
- Label: Capitol
- Producer: Jim Ed Norman

Anne Murray chronology
Let's Keep It That Way (1978)	New Kind of Feeling (1979)	I'll Always Love You (1979)

Singles from A New Kind of Feeling
- 1. "I Just Fall in Love Again" Released: January 1979; 2. "Shadows in the Moonlight" Released: May 1979

Professional ratings
Review scores
Source	Rating
AllMusic	3/5 stars
The Encyclopedia of Popular Music	4/5 stars

New Kind of Feeling is the fifteenth studio album by Canadian country and pop vocalist Anne Murray, released in 1979 on Capitol Records. The recording continued her chart success from the previous year's Let's Keep It That Way, with the newer album hitting No. 2 and No. 23 on the United States Country and Pop album charts, respectively. It was certified platinum by the RIAA. The album was produced by Jim Ed Norman.

In her native Canada, New Kind of Feeling hit No. 1 on the Country album charts, and No. 6 on the Pop album charts. In the United States, both of the album's singles, "Shadows in the Moonlight" and "I Just Fall in Love Again", topped the Country and Adult Contemporary charts. Both tracks were big Pop hits as well, with "Shadows in the Moonlight" reaching No. 25, and "I Just Fall in Love Again" reaching No. 12 on the Billboard Hot 100. It stands as one of Murray's biggest career albums.

== Track listing ==
1. "Shadows in the Moonlight" (Charlie Black, Rory Bourke) - 3:25
2. "You've Got What It Takes" (Berry Gordy, Gwen Gordy Fuqua, Tyran Carlo) - 3:27
3. "I Just Fall in Love Again" (Steve Dorff, Larry Herbstritt, Gloria Sklerov, Harry Lloyd) - 2:47
4. "Take This Heart" (Robin Batteau) - 3:48
5. "Yucatan Cafe" (Adam Mitchell) - 3:02
6. "For No Reason at All" (Barry Mann) - 2:47
7. "Raining in My Heart" (Felice and Boudleaux Bryant) - 3:09
8. "That's Why I Love You" (Andrew Gold, Gene Garfin) - 2:56
9. "(He Can't Help It If) He's Not You" (Steve Gillette) - 3:09
10. "Heaven Is Here" (Gene MacLellan) - 2:05

== Personnel ==
- Anne Murray – lead vocals, backing vocals
- Brian Gatto – keyboards
- Pat Riccio, Jr. – keyboards
- Doug Riley – keyboards
- Bob Mann – guitars
- Jim Pirie – guitars
- Brian Russell – guitars
- Bob Lucier – steel guitar
- Tom Szczesniak – bass
- Barry Keane – drums, percussion
- Rick Wilkins – horn and string arrangements, conductor
- Eric Robertson – horn arrangements (2)
- Bruce Murray – backing vocals
- Debbie Schaal – backing vocals
- Terry Black – backing vocals (4)
- Steve Kennedy – backing vocals (4)
- Collina Phillips – backing vocals (4)
- Laurel Ward – backing vocals (4)

Production

- Balmur Ltd. – executive producers
- Jim Ed Norman – producer
- Ken Friesen – engineer
- Peter Holcomb – assistant engineer
- Michael James Jackson – assistant engineer
- Ken Perry – mastering
- Gene Thompson – mastering
- Capitol Mastering (Hollywood, California, USA) – mastering location
- Les Usherwood – art direction, design
- Bill Langstroth – photography
- Typsetta, Inc. – typography
