= Love Song (Anne Murray album) =

Studio album by Anne Murray
- Released: February 1974
- Studio: Eastern Sound (Toronto, Ontario)
- Genre: Country
- Length: 32:36
- Label: Capitol
- Producer: Brian Ahern

Anne Murray chronology
Danny's Song (1973)	Love Song (1974)	Country (1974)

Singles from Love Song
- 1. "Send a Little Love My Way" Released: June 1973; 2. "A Love Song" Released: December 1973; 3. "You Won't See Me" Released: 1974; 4. "Just One Look" Released: 1974; 5. "Son of a Rotten Gambler" Released: September 1974

Professional ratings
Review scores
Source	Rating
Allmusic	3/5 stars
Christgau's Record Guide	B

Love Song is the ninth studio album by Canadian country pop artist Anne Murray released in 1974 via Capitol Records. It peaked at number 24 on the Billboard Pop Albums chart and the title track won a Grammy Award for Best Female Country Vocal Performance.

== Track listing ==
No.	Title	Writer(s)	Length
1.	"A Love Song"	Kenny Loggins, Dona Lyn George	2:49
2.	"Just One Look"	Doris Troy, Gregory Carroll	2:56
3.	"Another Pot O' Tea"	Paul Grady	3:25
4.	"Children of My Mind"	Gary Osborne	3:05
5.	"Real Emotion"	Alan O'Day	3:19
6.	"Watching the River Run"	Loggins, Jim Messina	2:34
7.	"Backstreet Lovin'"	Brian Russell, Brenda Gordon, David Palmer	4:45
8.	"Son of a Rotten Gambler"	Chip Taylor	3:10
9.	"You Won't See Me"	John Lennon, Paul McCartney	4:06
10.	"Send a Little Love My Way"	Henry Mancini, Hal David	2:46

== Personnel ==
Musicians

- Anne Murray – lead vocals, backing vocals
- Pat Riccio, Jr. – keyboards
- Peter Cornell – harmonium, harp
- Brian Ahern – guitars, bass, ukulele, percussion
- Dave Cardwell – guitars
- Steven Rhymer – guitars
- Mason Williams – guitars
- Miles Wilkinson – guitars
- Bill Langstroth – banjo
- Ben Keith – steel guitar
- Skip Beckwith – bass, percussion
- Andy Cree – drums
- Don Thompson – percussion, saxophones
- Butch Watanabe – trombone
- Brent Titcomb – harmonica
- Dianne Brooks – backing vocals
- Lee Harris – backing vocals
- Laurel Ward – backing vocals

Music arrangements

- Brian Ahern – arrangements, horn arrangements
- Skip Beckwith – horn arrangements
- Don Thompson – horn arrangements
- Rick Wilkins – string arrangements and conductor

== Production ==
- Paul White – executive producer
- Brian Ahern – producer, engineer
- Tom Brennand – engineer
- Chris Skene – engineer
- The Mastering Lab (Hollywood, California) – mastering location
- Pacific Eye & Ear – art direction, design
- Drew Struzan – illustrations
- Paul Cade – portrait photography
- Viktor Von Maderspach – portrait photography
- Harry Mittman – photography
