= Oklahoma Crude (film) =

1973 film by Stanley Kramer

- Theatrical poster by Howard Terpning
- Directed by: Stanley Kramer
- Screenplay by: Marc Norman
- Produced by: Stanley Kramer
- Starring: George C. Scott; Faye Dunaway; John Mills; Jack Palance
- Cinematography: Robert Surtees
- Edited by: Folmar Blangsted
- Music by: Henry Mancini
- Production company: Stanley Kramer Productions
- Distributed by: Columbia Pictures
- Release date: June 13, 1973 (Oklahoma)
- Running time: 112 minutes
- Country: United States
- Language: English
- Box office: $2,500,000 (US/ Canada rentals)

Oklahoma Crude is a 1973 American comedy-drama western film directed by Stanley Kramer in Panavision. It stars George C. Scott, Faye Dunaway, John Mills and Jack Palance. It was entered into the 8th Moscow International Film Festival where Kramer won the Golden Prize for Direction. The song "Send a Little Love My Way", sung by Anne Murray, was featured in the film and was nominated for a Golden Globe Award for Best Original Song in 1973.

== Plot ==
In 1913, Lena Doyle is the owner of a small tract of land outside Almira, Oklahoma that contains a prominent hill. Lena believes the hill is a dome above a large pool of oil and runs a "wild cat" drilling operation, but her derrick has yet to yield anything. Her only employee is Jimmy, a young Native American. One day, Lena's estranged father, Cleon Doyle, shows up and offers to help, but she refuses. Cleon nevertheless tries to hire men to guard Lena's property, but he is shunned, as no one wants to stand in the way of "Pan Okie", or Pan Oklahoma Oil & Gas, which is the most powerful oil company in the region and Almira's principal benefactor. Only one man, Spanish-American War veteran Noble "Mase" Mason, accepts. Lena is wary of Mason, but allows him to work for her while continuing to reject her father.

One night during a downpour, Walter C. Hellman, a retired US Army captain employed by Pan Oklahoma as a fixer, arrives and demands Lena sell her tract to the company. She declines, and Hellman orders his henchmen to beat her and Jimmy, who dies from his injuries. Mason offers to abandon Lena for a $200 bribe, but Hellman disparages him as a spineless opportunist and not only refuses to pay, but has him beaten as well. Cleon nurses Lena and Mason back to health while Hellman illegally occupies and works Lena's tract. In Almira, Lena and Cleon, who are now reconciled, are informed by a lawyer that Lena's case against Pan Oklahoma is hopeless because the company has influence over the judges, but he suggests that she could take back her land by force and justify it as self-defense. Together, Lena, Cleon, and Mason assault Hellman's workers with shotguns and grenades, scaring them off and reclaiming the tract.

The next day, Hellman returns with Henry H. Wilcox, the son of Pan Oklahoma's owner, and a larger group of men, threatening to "besiege" Lena's property unless she agrees to sell. She again refuses him. Hellman has the tract encircled and placed under constant guard, but is restrained from taking more violent action by Wilcox. Other oil companies learn of the squabble and send their own representatives to monitor the tract, hoping to take advantage. As the siege stretches on, Mason is forced to sneak into the Pan Oklahoma camp to steal food and drink, earning Lena's gratitude. Soon after, Lena's derrick is affected by a blow out and the drill cable breaks. Against Lena's wishes, Cleon climbs the derrick to replace the cable, wearing a metal plate on his back as protection from Hellman's gunmen. The cable is replaced, but on the way down Cleon loses his plate and is shot dead. In the wake of the tragedy, Lena pursues a romantic relationship with Mason.

Finally, Lena's derrick strikes oil, and the various oil company representatives flock to buy it. She settles on the somewhat high price of $2.50 per barrel, but the frenzied representatives accept. Unfortunately, the oil gush abruptly stops; Lena only drilled a small, worthless pocket of oil, and her well is a bust. Hellman and the other oil men immediately pack up and leave. Lena and Mason muse about looking for oil in Mexico, but Mason declares he wants to leave the oil business behind. As he walks away, Lena calls for him.

== Cast ==
- George C. Scott as Noble "Mase" Mason
- Faye Dunaway as Lena Doyle
- John Mills as Cleon Doyle
- Jack Palance as Walter C. Hellman
- William Lucking as Marion
- Harvey Jason as Henry H. Wilcox
- Ted Gehring as Wobbly
- Cliff Osmond as Massive Man
- Rafael Campos as Jimmy
- Woodrow Parfrey as Lawyer
- John Hudkins as Bloom
- Harvey Parry as Bliss
- Bob Herron as Dulling (as Dullnig)
- Jerry Brown as Rucker
- Jim Burk as Moody
- Henry Wills as Walker
- Hal Smith as C. R. Miller
- Cody Bearpaw as Indian
- James Jeter as Stapp
- Larry D. Mann as Deke Watson
- John Dierkes as Farmer
- Karl Lukas as Hobo #1
- Wayne Storm as Hobo #2
- Billy Varga as Cook

== Production ==
Despite the title, the movie was primarily filmed on a cattle ranch near Stockton, California. Assured by the locals that the weather was mild and temperate, the only thing it didn't do was snow. Filming from September to November 1972, the temperature went from 110 degrees to so cold the actors had to put ice cubes in their mouths to keep their breath from showing up on screen (the movie supposedly took place during the summer).

== Release ==
The film had its premiere on June 13, 1973, in Tulsa, Oklahoma. It also opened in Oklahoma City the same day.

== Reception ==
In the Chicago Sun-Times, film critic Roger Ebert wrote:

We have seen this relationship many times in the movies, most memorably in The African Queen. The buried plot is always the same: Beautiful woman and uncultured man find themselves thrown together in a colorful enterprise. They have nothing in common except the enterprise, they think, but gradually their co-operation breeds respect, affection and finally love. Class barriers fall as the sun sets and romantic music swells... [Stanley] Kramer, to give him his due, has handled the ending on a restrained note that seems just right; we don't get slow-motion shots of lovers running across a meadow (or an oil field) into each other's arms.

== See also ==
- List of American films of 1973
