= You Won't See Me =

1965 song by the Beatles

- Cover of the Northern Songs sheet music (licensed to Sonora Musikförlag)

Song by the Beatles

from the album Rubber Soul
- Released: 3 December 1965
- Recorded: 11 November 1965
- Studio: EMI, London
- Genre: Pop
- Length: 3:22 (stereo); 3:25 (mono)
- Label: Parlophone
- Songwriter: Lennon–McCartney
- Producer: George Martin

"You Won't See Me" is a song originally recorded by the English rock band the Beatles from their 1965 album Rubber Soul. It was written by Paul McCartney and credited to Lennon–McCartney. The lyrics address McCartney's troubled relationship with Jane Asher and her desire to pursue her career as a stage and film actress. The Beatles recorded the song during what Mark Lewisohn describes as a "marathon" final recording session for Rubber Soul, to ensure the album's pre-Christmas release.

The Beatles' version of the track was not issued as a single, and the charting version of "You Won't See Me" was a 1974 recording of the song by Anne Murray. This version reached number 8 on the Billboard Hot 100 and number 1 on the Billboard Easy Listening chart. It also hit number 5 in Canada.

== Background and inspiration ==
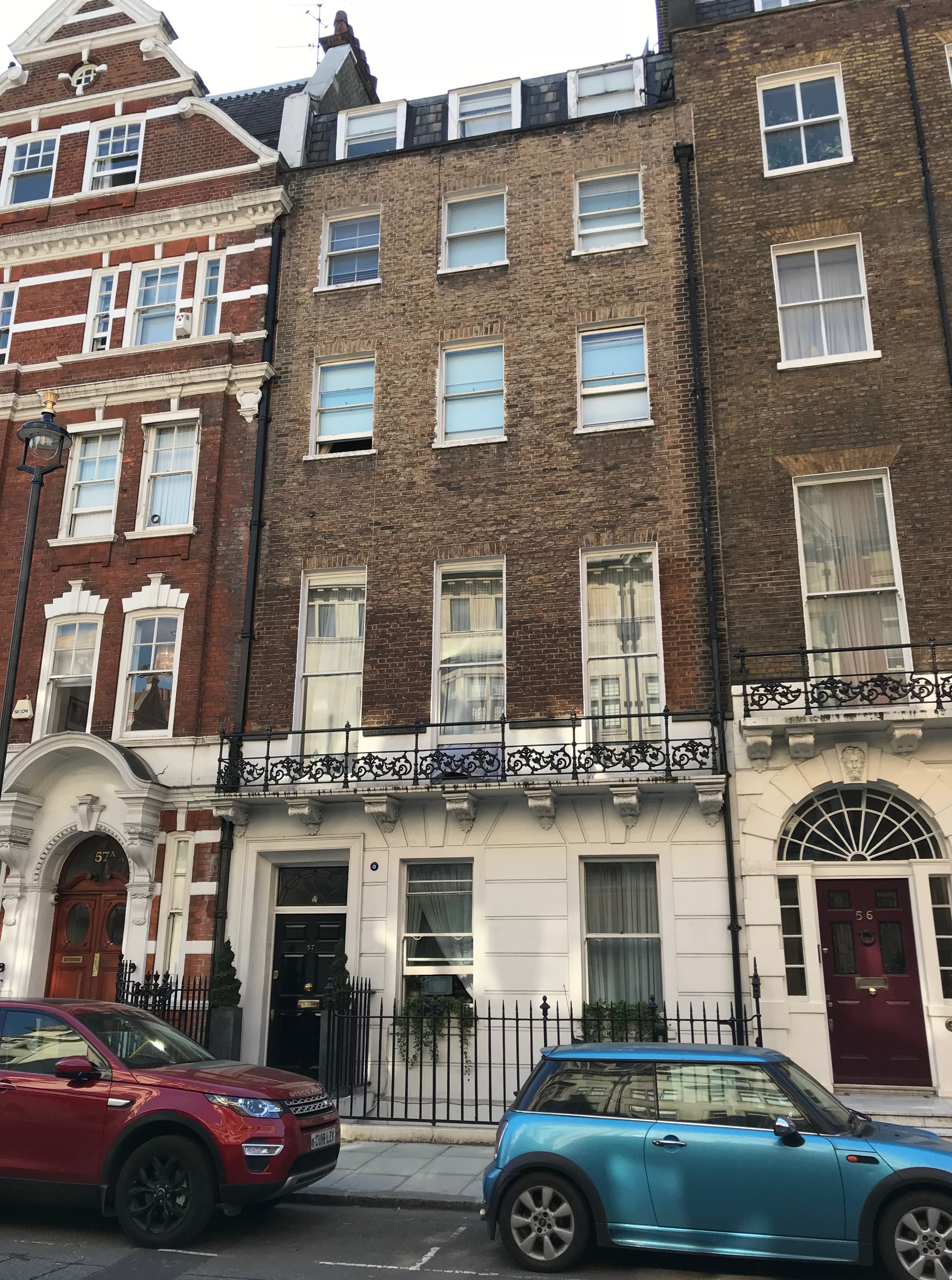
McCartney wrote the song in the basement music room at 57 Wimpole Street (pictured in 2018), the Asher family's home in central London.

"You Won't See Me" is about a crisis in McCartney's relationship with girlfriend Jane Asher, who was refusing to comply with McCartney's wishes that she stay at home and put his interests first. She had accepted an offer to appear in a stage production at the Bristol Old Vic theatre in 1965, while the Beatles were recording Rubber Soul. McCartney attempted to telephone her in Bristol, but she rejected him by not returning his calls. McCartney later said that it was "shattering to be without her".

McCartney had lived in the Asher family home at Wimpole Street in central London since 1963. He recalled writing the song in the family music room in the basement of the house. His composition originated from "a two-note progression that I had very high on the first two strings of the guitar: the E and B strings". He developed this by playing descending semitones on the B string while letting the top string ring out. He described the song as "very Motown-flavoured" with a "James Jamerson feel". He drew musical inspiration for the composition from the Four Tops' UK hit single "It's the Same Old Song" (1965).

During this period, McCartney also wrote "We Can Work It Out" and "I'm Looking Through You" as commentaries on his relationship with Asher. The more biting tone of his lyrics marked a change from his typical love songs, in Howard Sounes' interpretation, McCartney later said of the band's approach to songwriting on Rubber Soul: "We'd had our cute period, and now it was time to expand."

== Recording ==
The Beatles recorded "You Won't See Me" during the last day of recording for Rubber Soul – an all-night session that started at 6 pm on 11 November 1965. The deadline for completing the album was up, and the band needed to record three songs that night, in addition to finishing work on "I'm Looking Through You". As a result, they cut the song in only two takes. At 3:22, it was the longest track the Beatles had recorded up until that point. The fadeout is slightly longer on the mono mix.

McCartney played piano on the basic track and then overdubbed his bass part. The tempo gradually slows down throughout the song, a point that music journalist Robert Fontenot attributes to McCartney leading the performance on piano, rather than Ringo Starr's timekeeping abilities on the drums. In author Jonathan Gould's description of the song, the tempo appears to "drag" due to McCartney's "hyperactive Motown-style bass line". Mal Evans, one of the Beatles' roadies, is credited on the album sleeve as having played Hammond organ. His contribution consists solely of an A note held throughout the final verse and the coda. Gould also comments on the effect achieved by John Lennon and George Harrison's wordless backing vocals over the verses, saying that their voices represent "a pair of deaf ears" by "embodying the girl's indifference" to McCartney's complaints. Starr augmented his drum part with a separate hi-hat overdub, adding rhythmic accents throughout the song.

== Release and reception ==
Rubber Soul was released on 3 December 1965 on EMI's Parlophone record label. "You Won't See Me" was sequenced as the third track, between Lennon's "Norwegian Wood" and "Nowhere Man". While the album was an immediate commercial success, some reviewers in the UK were unprepared for the artistic progression the Beatles had made in their musical arrangements and as lyricists.

In his review for Record Mirror, Richard Green wrote: "It is possible to say that Lennon and McCartney are the great songwriting team of the day and that Beatles performances are spot-on, but this LP cannot support that statement." He included "You Won't See Me" among the tracks that were "dull and ordinary" with "none of the old Beatles excitement and compulsiveness about them". Melody Maker said that the band's sound had become "a little subdued" and that songs such as "You Won't See Me" and "Nowhere Man" "almost get monotonous – an un-Beatle-like feature if ever there was one". By contrast, Nikki Wine (aka Eden) of KRLA Beat found the album "unbelievably sensational" and described "You Won't See Me" as "One of the greatest arrangements and blending of melodies by the Beatles ... and it has to be one of the best cuts on the disc."

Among more recent appraisals, Tim Riley says that the song's "antagonism can't help being tempered by [McCartney's] melodic suavity, so he winds up sounding like an innocent victim rather than a co-conspirator in a love affair"; similarly, the arrangement and the position of McCartney's vocal in the mix ensure that "the texture becomes more engaging than the emotion." Riley nevertheless admires the complementary aspect of McCartney's bass and piano contributions, adding of Rubber Soul as a whole: "without ever being intrusive, his bass emerges as an irreplaceable part of the overall texture. Because he virtually breathes melody, his bass lines begin to soar with inventive counterpoint to the band ..." Ian MacDonald says the song, like "Nowhere Man", "needed something to lift it" and rues the group's use of the "irritating 'ooh-la-la-la' backing-vocal formula". He concludes that, while it is "redeemed" by McCartney's fluid bass playing, "'You Won't See Me' soon founders under the weight of its own self-pity and expires long before struggling to the end of an unusually protracted fade." In his song review for AllMusic, Richie Unterberger finds the buoyant melody at odds with the dejected lyrics, but he praises the vocal arrangement, particularly "the brilliant interaction of counterpoint melodies" through the addition of Lennon and Harrison's harmonies.

== Personnel ==
According to Ian MacDonald:

- Paul McCartney – double-tracked lead vocal, bass guitar, piano
- John Lennon – backing vocal, tambourine
- George Harrison – backing vocal, lead guitar
- Ringo Starr – drums, hi-hat
- Mal Evans – Hammond organ

== Anne Murray version ==
"You Won't See Me"

Single by Anne Murray

from the album Love Song
- B-side: "He Thinks I Still Care"
- Released: April 1974
- Recorded: January 1974
- Studio: Eastern Sound, Toronto
- Genre: Pop
- Length: 4:06 (album version); 3:07 (single edit)
- Label: Capitol
- Songwriter: Lennon–McCartney
- Producer: Brian Ahern

Anne Murray singles chronology
"A Love Song" (1974)	"You Won't See Me" (1974)	"Son of a Rotten Gambler" (1974)

In 1974, "You Won't See Me" became a big hit for Anne Murray, reaching number 8 on the Billboard Hot 100 and number 1 on the Billboard Easy Listening chart. Lennon is said to have told Murray that her version of "You Won't See Me" was one of his favourite Beatles covers. Murray also performed the song with the rock band Chicago on their 1974 TV special "Meanwhile Back in the Rockies."

Murray later re-recorded the song as a duet with Shelby Lynne as part of her 2007 Duets: Friends & Legends album. A self-professed Beatles fanatic, Murray covered several other songs of theirs as singles, including "Day Tripper" and "I'm Happy Just to Dance with You". The soulful backing vocals were devised by Murray's backup singer, Diane Brooks, and the bass line was devised by her bass player, Skip Beckwith.

=== Chart performance ===
==== Weekly charts ====
Chart (1974)	Peak position
Australia (Kent Music Report)	49
Canadian RPM Top Singles	5
Canadian Adult Contemporary	4
New Zealand (Listener)	13
US Billboard Easy Listening	1
US Billboard Hot 100	8
US Cash Box Top 100	8

==== Year-end charts ====
Chart (1974)	Rank
Canadian Top Singles	72
US Billboard Hot 100	54
US Cash Box	48

== Sources ==
- The Beatles (2000). The Beatles Anthology. San Francisco, CA: Chronicle Books. ISBN 0-8118-2684-8.
- Decker, James M. (2009). "'Try thinking more': Rubber Soul and the Beatles' transformation of pop". In Womack, Kenneth (ed.). The Cambridge Companion to the Beatles. Cambridge: Cambridge University Press. pp. 75–89. ISBN 978-0-521-68976-2.
- Everett, Walter (2001). The Beatles as Musicians: The Quarry Men through Rubber Soul. New York, NY: Oxford University Press. ISBN 0-19-514105-9.
- Gould, Jonathan (2007). Can't Buy Me Love: The Beatles, Britain and America. London: Piatkus. ISBN 978-0-7499-2988-6.
- Kruth, John (2015). This Bird Has Flown: The Enduring Beauty of Rubber Soul, Fifty Years On. Milwaukee, WI: Backbeat Books. ISBN 978-1-61713-573-6.
- Lewisohn, Mark (2005) [1988]. The Complete Beatles Recording Sessions: The Official Story of the Abbey Road Years 1962–1970. London: Bounty Books. ISBN 978-0-7537-2545-0.
- MacDonald, Ian (2005). Revolution in the Head: The Beatles' Records and the Sixties. Pimlico. ISBN 978-1-84413-828-9.
- Riley, Tim (2002) [1988]. Tell Me Why – The Beatles: Album by Album, Song by Song, the Sixties and After. Cambridge, MA: Da Capo Press. ISBN 978-0-306-81120-3.
- Sounes, Howard (2010). Fab: An Intimate Life of Paul McCartney. London: HarperCollins. ISBN 978-0-00-723705-0.
- Turner, Steve (2016). Beatles '66: The Revolutionary Year. New York, NY: Ecco. ISBN 978-0-06-247558-9.
- Whitburn, Joel (2002). Top Adult Contemporary: 1961-2001. Record Research.
- Winn, John C. (2008). Way Beyond Compare: The Beatles' Recorded Legacy, Volume One, 1962–1965. New York, NY: Three Rivers Press. ISBN 978-0-307-45239-9.
