= A Love Song (Loggins and Messina song) =

- German cover art

Single by Anne Murray

from the album Love Song
- B-side: "You Can't Go Back"
- Released: December 1973
- Recorded: October 1973
- Genre: Country, pop
- Length: 2:50
- Label: Capitol
- Songwriters: Dona Lyn George; Kenny Loggins
- Producer: Brian Ahern

Anne Murray singles chronology
"Send a Little Love My Way" (1973)	"A Love Song" (1973)	"You Won't See Me" (1974)

"A Love Song" is a song written by Kenny Loggins and Dona Lyn George, first released by the folk-rock duo Loggins and Messina in 1973 on their album Full Sail. Country artist Anne Murray (who had taken her recording of another Loggins & Messina recording, "Danny's Song", to the top-ten in late 1972) covered the song later that year for her album of the same name.

Released in December 1973, Murray's version became a major crossover hit early in 1974. In her native Canada, it topped all three singles charts: the overall Top Singles chart, the Country Tracks chart and the Adult Contemporary chart. In the United States, the song peaked at No. 5 on the Billboard magazine Hot Country Singles chart and just missed the Top 10 of the Billboard Hot 100, peaking at No. 12. The song fared even better there in the adult contemporary market — it became Murray's third chart-topper on Billboard's American Hot Adult Contemporary Singles chart. (In Canada, it was her seventh No. 1 on both the country and adult contemporary charts.) This was Murray's second Loggins & Messina cover, having charted with her version of their "Danny's Song" the previous year.

At the 17th Annual Grammy Awards in 1975, Anne Murray won the first of her three Grammy Awards for Best Female Country Vocal Performance for this song. The song also appears on Murray's 2007 album Anne Murray Duets: Friends & Legends, performed as a duet with the K. d. Lang.

Later versions include Dar Williams, Jonathan Rayson and Kenny Loggins.

== Personnel on Loggins & Messina version ==
- Kenny Loggins – lead vocals, classical acoustic guitar
- Jim Messina – harmony vocals, acoustic guitar, banjo
- Jon Clarke – bass flute, alto flute
- Al Garth – recorder
- Larry Sims – bass, backing vocals
- Merel Bregante – drums, backing vocals
- Michael Omartian – piano
- Milt Holland – shakers, triangle, congas, pandeiro

== Chart history ==
=== Weekly charts ===
Chart (1973–1974)	Peak position
Canada Adult Contemporary (RPM)	1
Canada Country Singles (RPM)	1
Canada Top Singles (RPM)	1
US Adult Contemporary (Billboard)	1
US Hot Country Singles (Billboard)	5
US Billboard Hot 100	12
US Cash Box Top 100	10

=== Year-end charts ===
Chart (1974)	Rank
Canada RPM Top Singles	28
US Billboard Hot 100	80
US Cash Box	87
