= Beth Nielsen Chapman =

American singer and songwriter

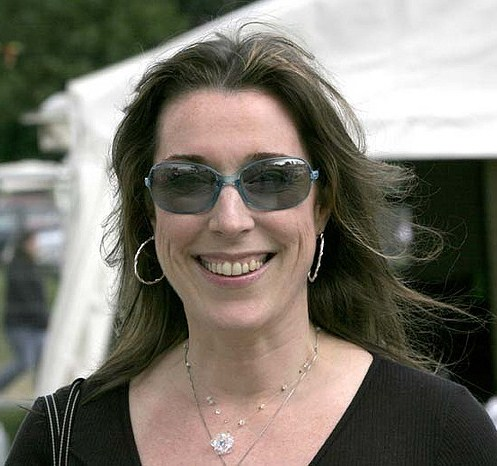
- Chapman in 2005

Background information
- Born: September 14, 1956 (age 70); Harlingen, Texas, U.S.
- Genres: Adult contemporary; country; pop
- Occupations: Singer; songwriter
- Years active: 1976–present
- Labels: BNC; Reprise; Compass
- Website: bethnielsenchapman.com

Beth Nielsen Chapman (born September 14, 1956) is an American singer and songwriter who has written hits for country and pop music performers. She was inducted into the Nashville Songwriters Hall of Fame in 2016. She is a two-time Grammy Award and an ACM Award nominee and won the Country Music Association Award for Song of the Year in 1999 for writing Faith Hill's "This Kiss".

== Early life ==
Beth Nielsen Chapman was born on September 14, 1956, in Harlingen, Texas. She is the middle child of five in a Catholic family. Her father was a major in the United States Air Force and her mother was a nurse. While Beth was growing up her family moved several times, settling in Alabama in 1969. While living in Germany, at age 11, Chapman started playing the guitar after her mother hid a Framus guitar as a Father's Day gift for her father in her room. She learned to play the piano as well when she started playing the guitar. As a child and teenager, she listened to a variety of music including Hoagy Carmichael, Tony Bennett, James Taylor, and Carole King.

In 1976, Chapman played with a rock and pop group, called "Harmony", in Montgomery, Alabama replacing Tommy Shaw, who had just left to join Styx. For the group, she sang and played the acoustic guitar and the piano, performing at the popular bar of a bowling alley, Kegler's Kove. She has returned infrequently to play in the area ever since.

== Songwriter ==
Chapman had several popular songs on the adult contemporary charts in the 1990s like "I Keep Coming Back to You", "Walk My Way", and "All I Have". In 1993, she sang a duet with Paul Carrack, "In the Time It Takes".

A co-songwriter of Faith Hill's hit song "This Kiss", Chapman has written songs performed by many singers, including:

- Alabama ("Here We Are")
- Bette Midler ("The Color of Roses")
- Claudia Church ("What's the Matter with You Baby")
- Crystal Gayle ("When Love Is New")
- Don Williams ("Maybe That's All It Takes")
- Highway 101 ("All the Reasons Why", "Long Way Down")
- Holly Dunn ("You Say You Will")
- Ilse DeLange ("World of Hurt")
- Jim Brickman and Rebecca Lynn Howard ("Simple Things")
- Juice Newton ("The Moment You Were Mine")
- Lorrie Morgan ("Five Minutes")
- Martina McBride ("Happy Girl")
- Mary Chapin Carpenter ("Almost Home")
- Megan McKenna ("Far Cry from Love")
- Michael W. Smith (co-written)("She Walks with Me")
- Mindy McCready ("One in a Million")
- Neil Diamond ("Deep Inside of You")
- Suzy Bogguss ("Save Yourself")
- Tanya Tucker ("Strong Enough to Bend")
- Terri Clark ("Sometimes Goodbye")
- Trisha Yearwood ("Down on My Knees", "You Say You Will", "Trying to Love You")
- Waylon Jennings ("Shine on Me", "Old Church Hymns and Nursery Rhymes")
- Willie Nelson ("Nothing I Can Do About It Now", "Ain't Necessarily So", "If My World Didn't Have You")

Musicians who have performed with Chapman on her albums include:

- Amy Grant on "Thanks to Spring"
- Bonnie Raitt on "Heads Up for the Wrecking Ball" and "Shake My Soul"
- Emmylou Harris and Kimmie Rhodes on "There's a Light"
- John Prine on "Every December Sky"
- Michael McDonald on "Right Back into the Feeling" and "Will and Liz"
- Paul Carrack on "In the Time It Takes"
- Vince Gill on "Deeper Still"

Her son Ernest Chapman III performs with her on "Your Love Stays".

Beth Chapman performed at the 2nd Annual "Women Rock! Girls and Guitars" special on Lifetime, singing backing vocals with Emmylou Harris, performing with the ensemble on a cover version of "Take It to the Limit" and on "There's a Light" with Harris, Pat Benatar, Sheryl Crow, and Shea Seger singing back-up.

Some of Chapman's songwriting collaborators are Annie Roboff, Bill Lloyd, Eric Kaz, Harlan Howard, Joe Henry, and Judie Tzuke.

== Charting singles ==
In the U.S., Chapman has never made the Hot 100 chart as a recording artist, although she had eight singles on the Billboard Top Adult Contemporary Singles chart. She is tied for first place (with Marilyn Maye) as the artist with the most charted Adult Contemporary hits without ever reaching the Billboard Hot 100, according to the Billboard Top Adult Contemporary Hits book.

Chapman had one song on the Billboard Bubbling Under The Hot 100 Chart. "Sand and Water" reached Number 2 on the Bubbling Under chart, a position often listed as No. 102 on the Hot 100 in various Billboard singles books.

She is a significantly more successful chart artist in Canada, where she scored three Top 40 hits on the national RPM chart in the early 1990s. Her biggest Canadian hit was "The Moment You Were Mine", which reached No. 23 in 1993.

== Recent recordings ==
Chapman's album Back to Love was released in the United Kingdom on January 25, 2010, and in the United States on May 25, 2010. The album contained 11 new compositions. The single "Even as It All Goes By" was BBC Radio 2's "Record of the Week" for the last week of 2009; it was the only new single added to the "A list" of BBC Radio 2's playlist at the end of 2009.

Additionally, Back to Love was BBC Radio 2's "Album of the Week" beginning on January 18, 2010. The album Liv On was released on October 7, 2016, for digital download and on CD the next week. It has Olivia Newton-John and Amy Sky songs about loss and moving on from grief. Chapman, Newton-John, and Sky toured Canada, the United States, the United Kingdom, and Ireland in 2017 in support of the album, performing mainly in smaller, more intimate venues. Her most recent album, Hearts of Glass, was released in 2018 and is available on CD and as a digital download.

== Personal life ==
Chapman has been widowed twice. Her first husband, Ernest Chapman, died of cancer in 1994. The song "Sand and Water" was written after Ernest's death; Elton John performed it during his 1997 world tour. The song was featured on the episode "Sand and Water" in Season 7 of ER (2000), as well as on the episode "Dead Man Dating" of Charmed (1998).

In 2008, she was engaged to psychologist and photographer Bob Sherman while living in Nashville. The engagement was the inspiration for her album Back to Love. In January 2011, Chapman married Sherman after a decade-long courtship. On December 9, 2022, Bob Sherman died from leukemia.

She has one son, Ernest (born 1981), who is also a musician and has performed with her. In 2000, she battled breast cancer.

== Discography ==
=== Albums ===
Year	Album	Chart positions			
Year	Album	US Heat	US Christian	UK	AUS
1980	Hearing It First	—	—	—	—
1990	Beth Nielsen Chapman	19	—	—	75
1993	You Hold the Key	16	—	—	149
1997	Sand and Water	30	—	—	155
1999	Greatest Hits	—	—	—	—
2002	Deeper Still	—	—	—	—
2004	Hymns	21	29	—	—
2005	Look	—	—	63	—
2007	Prism	—	—	—	—
2007	If Love Could Say God's Name DVD	—	—	—	—
2010	Back to Love	15	—	68	—
2012	The Mighty Sky	—	—	—	—
2014	Uncovered	—	—	—	—
2016	Liv On (with Olivia Newton-John and Amy Sky)	—	—	—	72
2018	Hearts of Glass	—	—	—	—
2022	CrazyTown	—	—	—	—

=== Singles ===
Year	Single	Chart positions				Album
Year	Single	US AC	AUS	CAN AC	CAN	Album
1991	"Walk My Way"	14	176	15	39	Beth Nielsen Chapman
1991	"All I Have"	12	90	37	49	Beth Nielsen Chapman
1991	"I Keep Coming Back to You"	13	—	—	—	Beth Nielsen Chapman
1992	"Life Holds On"	33	—	—	—	Beth Nielsen Chapman
1993	"The Moment You Were Mine"	37	—	21	23	You Hold the Key
1993	"Say It to Me Now"	—	—	—	—	You Hold the Key
1994	"In the Time It Takes"	25	—	—	34	You Hold the Key
1997	"Sand and Water"	22	—	47	—	Sand and Water
2000	"Shake My Soul"	26	—	—	—	Where the Heart Is Soundtrack

=== Music videos ===
Year	Video
1990	"That's The Easy Part"
1991	"Walk My Way"
1991	"All I Have"

=== Contributions ===
- Mother & Child (1995) – "Ave Maria"
- Time and Love: The Music of Laura Nyro (1997) – "Stoney End"
- Song of America (2007) – "Sometimes I Feel Like a Motherless Child"
