= I Just Fall in Love Again =

1977 song by The Carpenters

Song by The Carpenters

from the album Passage
- A-side: "Honolulu City Lights"
- Released: September 23, 1977
- Recorded: 1977
- Genre: Pop
- Length: 4:05
- Label: A&M
- Composers: Steve Dorff, Larry Herbstritt
- Lyricists: Gloria Sklerov, Harry Lloyd
- Producers: Richard Carpenter, Karen Carpenter

"I Just Fall in Love Again" is a song written by Larry Herbstritt, with co-writers Steve Dorff, Harry Lloyd, and Gloria Sklerov. Herbstritt had composed the melody and chords for the chorus and a chord progression for the verse, which he took to his friend Steve Dorff. Harry Lloyd and Gloria Sklerov completed the lyrics. The song was originally recorded by the Carpenters and later covered by Dusty Springfield, and Anne Murray, who was unaware Springfield had recorded it just 6 months prior.

== The Carpenters version ==
The Carpenters' version was included on the duo's 1977 album Passage. On the Carpenters' official website, Richard Carpenter notes that he felt the song was perfect for his sister Karen's voice and felt their version had hit-single potential. However, A&M Records decided not to release it because it was considered too long for Top 40 radio stations to play at the time (just over 4 minutes) and could not be abridged.

In 2004, Richard Carpenter added a remixed "I Just Fall in Love Again" to the Carpenters' 2-disc compilation, Gold: 35th Anniversary Edition.

=== Personnel ===
- Karen Carpenter – lead vocals
- Richard Carpenter – keyboards
- Joe Osborn – bass guitar
- Tony Peluso – electric guitar
- Ron Tutt – drums
- Earle Dumler – oboe
- Bill Linnane – piano
- Gregg Smith Singers – backing vocals

== Dusty Springfield version ==
Recorded in summer 1978 and released in early 1979 on Springfield's Living Without Your Love album the same week her record label, United Artists Records, was sold, the track was subsequently never released as a single and went largely unnoticed by the listening public due to the success of Anne Murray's recording of the song, released not long after.

== Anne Murray version ==
"I Just Fall in Love Again"

Single by Anne Murray

from the album New Kind of Feeling
- B-side: "Just to Feel This Love from You"
- Released: January 1979
- Recorded: 1978
- Genre: Country pop
- Length: 2:51
- Label: Capitol
- Songwriters: Steve Dorff, Larry Herbstritt (music); Gloria Sklerov, Harry Lloyd (lyrics)
- Producer: Jim Ed Norman

Anne Murray singles chronology
"You Needed Me" (1978)	"I Just Fall in Love Again" (1979)	"Shadows in the Moonlight" (1979)

Canadian country singer Anne Murray was unaware Dusty Springfield had recorded "I Just Fall in Love Again" just 6 months prior. Springfield was one of Murray's favourite singers, and she has said "If I had known (Springfield) had released it as a single, I never would have recorded it" as Murray's version of the song largely overshadowed Springfield's. She released it in early 1979, on her platinum-selling album New Kind of Feeling.

Murray released her version as a single, and it topped Billboard's Country and Adult Contemporary charts for three weeks, while reaching number 11 on the Cash Box Top 100 and number 12 on the Billboard Hot 100 chart.

It was the first of three successive number one Country hits and four consecutive number one Adult Contemporary hits during 1979 and 1980. Though Murray loves the song, she is quoted in The Billboard Book of Number One Adult Contemporary Hits as saying she was surprised at its success on the Country charts, as she didn't feel the song sounded very "country". Nevertheless, Billboard ranked it as the number one Country hit of 1979. Murray included the song as a posthumous duet with Dusty Springfield on her own 2007 album Duets: Friends & Legends.

=== Personnel ===
- Anne Murray – vocals
- Pat Riccio Jr., Brian Gatto – keyboards
- Jorn Anderson – drums
- Peter Cardinali – bass
- Aidan Mason, Brian Russell, Bob Mann – guitars
- Bob Lucier – steel guitar
- Rick Wilkins & Peter Cardinali – string arrangement

=== Chart performance ===
==== Weekly charts ====
Chart (1979)	Peak position
Canadian RPM Country Tracks	1
Canadian RPM Adult Contemporary	1
Canadian RPM Top Singles	1
US Hot Country Songs (Billboard)	1
US Adult Contemporary (Billboard)	1
US Billboard Hot 100	12
UK Singles Chart	58
US Cash Box Top 100	11

==== Year-end charts ====
Chart (1979)	Position
Canada RPM Top Singles	16
US Billboard Hot 100	72
US Adult Contemporary (Billboard)	5
US Hot Country Songs (Billboard)	1
US Cash Box	85
