= Shadows in the Moonlight (song) =

1979 single by Anne Murray

Single by Anne Murray

from the album New Kind of Feeling
- B-side: "Yucatan Cafe"
- Released: May 1979
- Recorded: 1978
- Genre: Country, pop
- Length: 3:25
- Label: Capitol
- Songwriters: Charlie Black and Rory Bourke
- Producer: Jim Ed Norman

Anne Murray singles chronology
"I Just Fall in Love Again" (1979)	"Shadows in the Moonlight" (1979)	"Broken Hearted Me" (1979)

"Shadows in the Moonlight" is a song written by Charlie Black and Rory Bourke, and recorded by Canadian country pop music singer Anne Murray. It was released in May 1979 as the second single from the album New Kind of Feeling. The song reached No. 1 on the Billboard Hot Country Singles chart that July, and was one of three chart-toppers for her during the year. "Shadows in the Moonlight" was Murray's third No. 1 single on the country chart and fourth overall (counting "You Needed Me," which topped the Billboard Hot 100 in 1978).

"Shadows in the Moonlight" was released during Murray's peak as a crossover artist, and the song was one of several that also charted on the Hot 100. The song peaked at #25 in July and spent three weeks at #1 on the Billboard Hot Adult Contemporary Tracks chart.

== Charts ==
=== Weekly charts ===
Chart (1979)	Peak position
Canadian RPM Country Tracks	1
Canadian RPM Adult Contemporary Tracks	1
Canadian RPM Top Singles	10
US Billboard Hot 100	25
US Adult Contemporary (Billboard)	1
US Hot Country Songs (Billboard)	1

=== Year-end charts ===
Chart (1979)	Position
US Adult Contemporary (Billboard)	4
US Hot Country Songs (Billboard)	23

== Sources ==
- New Kind of Feeling by Anne Murray at Allmusic
