= Jim Ed Norman =

American musician and producer (born 1948)

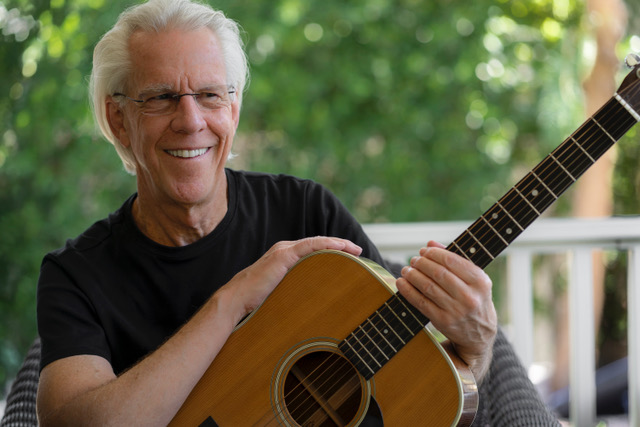
- Norman in 2021

Background information
- Born: Edward James Norman; October 16, 1948 (age 78); Fort Myers, Florida, U.S.
- Genres: Pop; rock; country; folk rock; pop rock; country rock
- Occupations: Producer; arranger; musician
- Instruments: Guitar; piano
- Years active: 1967–present

Jim Ed Norman (born October 16, 1948) is an American musician, record producer, arranger and label-head. As an arranger and producer, he was one of the principal architects of the distinctive sound of West Coast 1970s pop and country rock. He was President of Warner Bros. Nashville from 1984 to 2004.

== Early career ==
Having grown up in Florida, Norman pursued music at North Texas State University where he met Don Henley and joined his group, Felicity, in 1969, playing keyboards and guitar. After renaming themselves Shiloh, and by now based in Los Angeles, the group recorded an album produced by Kenny Rogers (Amos Records, 1970) which bore early signs of the direction in which 1970s country-rock would soon move en masse. The group disbanded shortly after the release of the album.

Norman then joined Uncle Jim's Music, a group which included award-winning singer-songwriter, Gary Nicholson. Uncle Jim's Music disbanded and he made the decision to pursue his primary interest in arranging and producing.

== Music and arrangement career ==
Norman contributed string arrangements and piano to a series of bestselling Asylum Records albums by the Eagles, released between 1973 and 1980 including Desperado (1973), One of These Nights (1975) and Hotel California (1976). During the same period, he wrote string and horn arrangements for Linda Ronstadt's album, Don't Cry Now (Asylum, 1973) and Hat Trick by America (Warner Bros, 1973). He arranged strings for Bob Seger's 1978 hit, "We've Got Tonite" (Capitol) and Kim Carnes' albums St. Vincent's Court (EMI, 1979) and Romance Dance (EMI, 1980) among others. He would continue to accrue arrangement credits throughout his career and well into its next phase in Nashville, for artists including Garth Brooks (Sevens, Capitol, 1997) and Trisha Yearwood ("In Another's Eyes", MCA, 1997).

== Production career ==
Norman's producing career began in the mid-1970s. Among the albums he worked on, and which featured his smooth signature style, were songwriting legend Jackie DeShannon's You're The Only Dancer (Amherst, 1977) and Quick Touches (Amherst, 1978), the first of which restored DeShannon to the pop charts with the spirited anthem "Don't Let The Flame Burn Out". Other productions included albums by New Riders of the Purple Sage (Marin County Line, MCA, 1977), Glenn Frey (No Fun Aloud, Elektra, 1982), and Jennifer Warnes's first hit, "Right Time of the Night" (Arista, 1977, US #6).

From 1977 onwards, Norman produced a large portion of Anne Murray's platinum-selling output, including Let's Keep It That Way (Capitol, 1978), New Kind of Feeling (Capitol, 1979), and I'll Always Love You (Capitol, 1979). Notoriously hard-to-please critic Robert Christgau credited these albums with Murray's "gradual revitilazation..." thanks to Jim Ed Norman's "...clean, honest, Nashville-quality work".

The albums were platinum-selling successes, spawning multiple hit singles including the US #1 "You Needed Me", which went on to win the Grammy Award for Best Female Pop Vocal Performance, and a string of US AC chart-toppers – "I Just Fall in Love Again", "Shadows in the Moonlight", "Broken Hearted Me", and "Daydream Believer". Norman's work with Murray extended well into the 1980s during which he produced the Grammy-winning A Little Good News (Capitol, 1983) and Heart Over Mind (Capitol, 1984), both of which won CMA awards. A Little Good News marked the first time that the CMA Album of the Year award had been won by a solo female act.

While Norman had been known for providing arrangements and keyboards on albums that typified the lush, Californian sound of the seventies, as a producer his natural inclination towards country music became increasingly prominent through his work with such artists as Kenny Rogers, Hank Williams Jr., Crystal Gayle, Michael Martin Murphey, BJ Thomas, Mark O'Connor, Victoria Shaw, Mickey Gilley, Johnny Lee, John Anderson, TG Sheppard, Gary Morris, Clay Walker, Pinkard & Bowden, Mac McAnally and Brenda Lee among others. Norman was named Producer of the Year by Cashbox in 1989.

During the 1990s, Nashville became home to a migration of singer/songwriters and the city gradually became known for embracing that genre. In 1990 Norman added his production talents to this emergent trend, producing the breakthrough self-titled Warner Bros/Reprise album by singer/songwriter Beth Nielsen Chapman. He resumed duties for Nielsen Chapman's follow-up, You Hold the Key (Warner Reprise, 1993).

== Time at Warner Nashville ==
After joining Warner Bros. Nashville as Head of A&R in 1983, Norman became President of the company in 1984. There, he was responsible for nurturing the talents of Randy Travis, Faith Hill, Blake Shelton, Travis Tritt, Dwight Yoakam, Beth Nielsen Chapman, Hank Williams Jr, Big & Rich and Michael Martin Murphey among others. His new role was also notable for the fact that it did not curtail his direct creative involvement in music, and he continued to produce and arrange.

== Diversity at Warner Bros. ==
Norman was influential at Warner Bros. Nashville, demonstrating an inclination to increase the company's range of genres. To this end, he was involved in the successful expansion of the label's reach to include the WB Gospel and Christian division, and the launches of the Warner Western imprint, featuring Native American and Cowboy artists, and a Hispanic label – Warner Discos. In addition, Norman created the Progressive division, signing artists including multi-Grammy-winning Take 6, Bela Fleck and the Flecktones, Mark O'Connor and American guitar virtuoso Shawn Lane.

== Post-Warner Bros. ==
Norman left Warner Bros in 2004 and relocated to Hawaii. There, he quickly became involved in music, organizing a music business program between the University of Hawaii and Belmont University, Nashville. In a short space of time, he was widely noted for his largesse, and his commitment to and support of local talent, which also benefitted Honolulu Community College, with the creation of the MELE program.

In 2010 he returned to Nashville to produce a variety of artists, notably Curb Records star, Dylan Scott, for whom he co-produced the 2016 US Country Airplay #1 hit "My Girl" and the follow-up success, "Hooked" (2017).

Norman joined Curb Records in 2012 and during his tenure served as CEO.

== Awards and philanthropy ==
In 1990, Norman was given the Andrew Heiskell Community Service Award – a Time Warner award designed to recognise those who have contributed outstanding degrees of community service.

In 1993, he received the Anti-Defamation League Johnny Cash Americanism Award, given to recognise individuals who have fought against racism, prejudice and bigotry.

Norman was the Founding President of Leadership Music, an organisation that brings together music industry personnel, encouraging community spirit, education, the cross-pollination of ideas, and issue-based interaction. In 2019, Leadership Music celebrated its 30th anniversary. In acknowledgement of his efforts to link the Nashville community at large with the entertainment industry, Norman was given the Leadership Music Bridge Award (subsequently renamed the Dale Franklin Leadership Music Award) in 1996.

Norman was presented with the Bob Kingsley Living Legend Award February 24, 2016 on stage at the Grand Ole Opry House. The award is annually presented to someone who has made a lasting impact on the country music business. Artists present to perform and pay tribute to Norman were Big & Rich, Don Henley, Mickey Gilley, Michael Martin Murphy, TG Sheppard, Gary Morris, Crystal Gayle, Mo Pitney, Jeff Hanna, Lee Brice and Kenny Rogers. Randy Travis made an unannounced rare public appearance.

Norman was the original Fund Raising Chair and past President of the W.O. Smith Nashville Community Music School, which provides private music instruction for the children of low income families given by an all-volunteer faculty at 50 cents a lesson

== The present ==
In 2021, Norman won a Best Roots Gospel Album Grammy for the Fisk Jubilee Singers 150th anniversary album, Celebrating Fisk! (Curb Records, 2020).

He continues to produce a wide variety of artists, most notably Dylan Scott, for whom he co-produced the #1 single "Nobody" (Curb Records, 2021) and the 2022 single, "New Truck" (Curb Records).

He is currently on the road with the Eagles' Hotel California Tour, conducting the 50-piece orchestra and the 20-member choir, recreating his original arrangements from the iconic, multi-platinum-selling album.

== Discography ==
=== Albums ===
1970
Shiloh – Shiloh (Amos Records)
Credit: Keyboards, Guitar, Vocals, String arrangements

1972
Uncle Jim's Music – There's a Song in This (Kapp Records)
Credit: Piano, Rhythm Guitar, Vocals, String arrangements

1973
America– Hat Trick (Warner Bros.)
Credit: String arrangements

Eagles – Desperado (Asylum)
Credit: String arrangements, keyboards on "Outlaw Man" and "Saturday Night"

Linda Ronstadt – Don't Cry Now – (Asylum Records)
Credit: Horn arrangements, String arrangements

1975
Eagles – One of These Nights (Asylum)
Credit: String arrangements, Conductor, Piano on "Lyin' Eyes" and "Take It To The Limit"

1976
Country Joe McDonald – Love is a Fire (Bellaphon)
Credit: Piano, String arrangements

Eagles – Hotel California (Asylum)
Credit: String arrangements, Conductor, Composer

Eagles – Their Greatest Hits (Asylum)
Credit: String arrangements

The Group With No Name – Moon Over Brooklyn (Casablanca)
Credit: String arrangements, Conductor

Linda Ronstadt – Greatest Hits (Asylum)
Credit: Horn arrangements, String arrangements

Jennifer Warnes – Jennifer Warnes (Arista)
Credit: Producer, Keyboards, String arrangements

1977
Coast To Coast – Original Soundtrack (Full Moon)
Credit: Producer

The New Commander Cody Band – Rock 'n Roll Again (Arista)
Credit: Producer, Arranger

Coon Elder – Coon Elder Band (Mercury)
Credit: Producer, Keyboards

Jackie DeShannon – You're the Only Dancer (Amherst)
Credit: Producer, Keyboards, String arrangements

Juice Newton & Silver Spur – After The Dust Settles (RCA)
Credit: String arrangements, Horn arrangements

Rains & Harris – Rains & Harris (RCA)
Credit: Producer

1978
Jackie DeShannon – Quick Touches (Amherst)
Credit: Producer, Keyboards, String arrangements

Anne Murray – Let's Keep It That Way (Capitol)
Credit: Producer

New Riders of the Purple Sage – Marin County Line (MCA)
Credit: Producer

Bob Seger – Stranger in Town (Capitol)
Credit: String arrangements, Conductor

1979
Kim Carnes – St. Vincent's Court (EMI)
Credit: String arrangements, Conductor

Anne Murray – New Kind of Feeling (Capitol)
Credit: Producer

Anne Murray – I'll Always Love You (Capitol)
Credit: Producer

The C.Y. Walkin' Band – Love The Way It Feels (Parachute)
Credit: Producer

1980
Kim Carnes – Romance Dance (EMI)
Credit: String arrangements

Eagles – Eagles Live (Asylum)
Credit: Conductor, Arrangements

Janie Fricke – I'll Need Someone To Hold Me When I Cry (CBS)
Credit: Producer

Albert Hammond – Your World & My World (Columbia)
Credit: Producer, Keyboards, String arrangements

Anne Murray – Somebody's Waiting (Capitol)
Credit: Producer

Anne Murray – A Country Collection (Capitol)
Credit: Producer

Anne Murray – Anne Murray's Greatest Hits (Capitol)
Credit: Producer

Charlie Rich – Once a Drifter (Elektra)
Credit: Producer

Urban Cowboy – Original Soundtrack (Asylum)
Credit: Producer

1981
Mickey Gilley – You Don't Know Me (Epic)
Credit: Producer

Johnny Lee – Bet Your Heart on Me (Asylum)
Credit: Producer

Anne Murray – Where Do You Go When You Dream (Capitol)
Credit: Producer

Anne Murray – Christmas Wishes (Capitol)
Credit: Producer

1982
Glenn Frey – No Fun Aloud (Asylum)
Credit: Producer, String arrangements, Horn arrangements

Janie Fricke – Greatest Hits (Columbia)
Credit: Producer

Mickey Gilley – Biggest Hits (Epic)
Credit: Producer

Johnny Lee – Sounds Like Love (Asylum)
Credit: Producer, Electric piano, Synthesizer

Michael Martin Murphey – The Best of Michael Martin Murphey (Liberty)
Credit: Producer, String arrangements, conductor

Anne Murray – The Hottest Night of the Year (Capitol)
Credit: Producer

Jennifer Warnes – The Best of Jennifer Warnes (Arista)
Credit: Producer

Teresa Straley – Never Enough (Alfa Records)
Credit: Producer, String arrangements, Conductor

1983
Mickey Gilley – You've Really Got A Hold on Me (Epic)
Credit: Producer

Johnny Lee – Greatest Hits (Asylum)
Credit: Producer

Michael Martin Murphey – The Heart Never Lies (Liberty)
Credit: Producer, String arrangements

Anne Murray – A Little Good News (Capitol)
Credit: Producer

T. G. Sheppard – Slow Burn (Warner Bros.)
Credit: Producer

1984
Mickey Gilley – Ten Years of Hits (Epic)
Credit: Producer

Gary Morris – Faded Blue (Warner Bros.)
Credit: Producer

Anne Murray – Heart Over Mind (Capitol)
Credit: Producer

The Osmonds – One Way Rider (Warner Bros.)
Credit: Producer

1985
John Anderson – Tokyo, Oklahoma (Warner Bros.)
Credit: Producer

Bandana – Bandana (Warner Bros.)
Credit: Producer

Gary Morris – Anything Goes (Warner Bros.)
Credit: Producer

The Osmonds – Today (Range Records)
Credit: Producer

Southern Pacific – Southern Pacific (Warner Bros.)
Credit: Producer, String arrangements

1986
Crystal Gayle – Straight to the Heart (Warner Bros.)
Credit: Producer

Michael Martin Murphey – Tonight We Ride (Warner Bros.)
Credit: Producer, Composer, String arrangements

Southern Pacific – Killbilly Hill (Warner Bros.)
Credit: Producer

Hank Williams, Jr. – Montana Cafe (Warner Bros.)
Credit: Producer

1987
John Anderson – Countrified (Warner Bros.)
Credit: Producer

The Forester Sisters – Christmas Card (Warner Bros.)
Credit: Producer

Crystal Gayle/Gary Morris – What If We Fall in Love (Warner Bros.)
Credit: Producer

Gary Morris – Hits (Warner Bros.)
Credit: Producer

Michael Martin Murphey – Americana (Warner Bros.)
Credit: Producer

Hank Williams, Jr. – Born To Boogie (Warner Bros.)
Credit: Producer

Hank Williams, Jr. – Hank Live (Warner Bros.)
Credit: Producer

1988
The Forester Sisters – Sincerely (Warner Bros.)
Credit: Producer

Crystal Gayle – Nobody's Angel (Warner Bros.)
Credit: Producer

Mac McAnally – Finish Lines (Geffen Records)
Credit: Producer

Southern Pacific – Zuma (Warner Bros.)
Credit: Producer

Take 6 – Take 6 (Warner Bros.)
Credit: Executive Producer

Hank Williams, Jr. – Wild Streak (Warner Bros.)
Credit: Producer

1989
Country Joe McDonald – Classics (Fantasy)
Credit: Arranger

The Forester Sisters – All I Need (Warner Bros.)
Credit: Producer

The Forester Sisters – Greatest Hits (Warner Bros.)
Credit: Producer

Michael Martin Murphey – Land of Enchantment (Warner Bros.)
Credit: Producer

Pink Cadillac – Original Soundtrack (Warner Bros.)
Credit: Producer

Kenny Rogers – Something Inside So Strong (Reprise)
Credit: Producer

Kenny Rogers – Christmas in America (Reprise)
Credit: Producer

Southern Pacific – County Line (Warner Bros.)
Credit: Producer

Hank Williams, Jr. – Hank Williams, Jr.'s Greatest Hits, Vol. 3 (Warner Bros./Curb)
Credit: Producer

1990
John Anderson – Greatest Hits, Volume II (Warner Bros.)
Credit: Producer

Crystal Gayle – A Crystal Christmas (Warner Bros.)
Credit: Producer

Emmylou Harris – Duets (Reprise)
Credit: Producer

Mac McAnally – Simple Life (Warner Bros.)
Credit: Producer

Gary Morris – Greatest Hits, Volume II (Warner Bros.)
Credit: Producer

Beth Nielsen Chapman – Beth Nielsen Chapman (Reprise)
Credit: Producer

Pinkard & Bowden – Live in Front of a Bunch of Dickheads (Warner Bros.)
Credit: Producer

Kenny Rogers – 20 Great Years (Reprise)
Credit: Producer

Kenny Rogers – Love Is Strange (Reprise)
Credit: Producer

Hank Williams, Jr. – America (Warner Bros./Curb)
Credit: Producer

Hank Williams, Jr. – Lone Wolf (Warner Bros./Curb)
Credit: Producer

1991
Holly Dunn – Milestones: Greatest Hits (Warner Bros.)
Credit: Producer

Brenda Lee – A Brenda Lee Christmas (Warner Bros.)
Credit: Producer

Mark O'Connor – The New Nashville Cats (Warner Bros.)
Credit: Producer

Kenny Rogers – Back Home Again (Reprise)
Credit: Producer

T. G. Sheppard – All-Time Greatest Hits (Warner Bros.)
Credit: Producer

Southern Pacific – Greatest Hits (Warner Bros.)
Credit: Producer, Cymbals, Arrangements

Hank Williams, Jr. – Pure Hank (Warner Bros./Curb)
Credit: Producer

1992
Michael Martin Murphey – What's Forever For (Cema)
Credit: Producer

Hank Williams, Jr. – The Bocephus Box (1st press: Capricorn, Reissue: Warner Bros./Curb)
Credit: Producer

1993
The Forester Sisters – Sunday Meetin' (Warner Bros.)
Credit: Producer, Arrangements

Kathie Lee Gifford – It's Christmas Time (Warner Bros.)
Credit: Producer

Kathie Lee Gifford – Sentimental (Warner Bros.)
Credit: Producer

Beth Nielsen Chapman – You Hold The Key (Reprise)
Credit: Executive Producer, Producer

Mark O'Connor – Heroes (Warner Bros.)
Credit: Producer

1994
John Anderson – You Can't Keep a Good Memory Down (MCA)
Credit: Producer

Tish Hinojosa – Destiny's Gate (Warner Bros.)
Credit: Producer

Anne Murray – Best of the Season (Capitol)
Credit: Producer

Anne Murray – The Best...So Far (Capitol)
Credit: Producer

Bob Seger – Greatest Hits (Capitol)
Credit: String arrangements, conductor

1995
The Foremen – Folk Heroes (Reprise)
Credit: Producer

Glenn Frey – Solo Collection (MCA)
Credit: Producer, String arrangements, Conductor

Herb Jeffries – Brief History of Herb Jeffries (Warner/Western)
Credit: Producer

Herb Jeffries – Bronze Buckaroo (Rides Again) (Warner Bros.)
Credit: Producer

Michael Martin Murphey – Sagebrush Symphony (Warner/Western)
Credit: Producer

Victoria Shaw – In Full View (Reprise)
Credit: Producer

B. J. Thomas – Precious Memories (Warner Bros.)
Credit: Producer

1996
Chris Cummings – Somewhere Inside (Warner Music Canada)
Credit: Producer

The Foreman – What's Left (Reprise)
Credit: Producer

Tish Hinojosa – Dreaming from the Labyrinth (Warner Bros.)
Credit: Producer

1997
Garth Brooks – Sevens (Capitol Nashville)
Credit: String arrangements, Conductor

Anita Cochran – Back To You (Warner Bros.)
Credit: Producer

The Forester Sisters – Greatest Gospel Hits (Warner Bros.)
Credit: Producer

Crystal Gayle – He Is Beautiful (Southpaw Musical Productions)
Credit: Producer

Tish Hinojosa – Sonar Del Laberinto (Warner Bros.)
Credit: Producer

Michael Martin Murphey – The Horse Legends (Warner Bros.)
Credit: Producer

Beth Nielsen Chapman – Sand and Water (Reprise)
Credit: Executive Producer

Kenny Rogers – Decade of Hits (Warner Bros.)
Credit: Producer

Victoria Shaw – Victoria Shaw (Reprise)
Credit: Producer

B. J. Thomas – I Believe (Warner Bros.)
Credit: Producer, Arrangements

Trisha Yearwood – (Songbook) A Collection of Hits (MCA Nashville)
Credit: Guitar

1998
Hal Bynum – If I Could Do Anything (Warner Bros.)
Credit: Producer

Chris Cummings – Chris Cummings (Warner Bros.)
Credit: Producer

Danni Leigh – 29 Nights (Decca)
Credit: String arrangements

Michael Martin Murphey – Wildfire 1972–1984 (Raven)
Credit: Producer

Take 6 – So Cool (Warner Bros.)
Credit: Producer

1999
Anita Cochran – Anita (Warner Bros.)
Credit: Producer

Janie Fricke – Super Hits (Sony)
Credit: Producer

Beth Nielsen Chapman – Greatest Hits (Reprise)
Credit: Executive Producer, Producer

Kongar-ol Ondar – Back Tuva Future (Warner Bros.)
Credit: Producer

Take 6 – Greatest Hits (Warner Bros.)
Credit: Producer

Hank Williams, Jr. – The Complete Hank Williams Jr (Curb)
Credit: Producer, Composer

2000
America – Highway: 30 Years of America (Rhino)
Credit: Arrangements, Piano

Chris Cummings – Lonesomeville (Warner Music Canada)
Credit: Producer

Damita – Damita (Warner Bros.)
Credit: Producer

Jackie DeShannon – Best of 1958 – 1980: Come And Get Me (Raven)
Credit: Producer

Eagles – Selected Works: 1972-1999 (Elektra)
Credit: String arrangements, Conductor, Piano

2001
Dave Loggins – The Good Side of Tomorrow: 1971–1984 (Raven)
Credit: Producer

America – The Definitive America (Rhino/WEA)
Credit: Piano, Arrangements

Michael Martin Murphey – Ultimate Collection (Hip-O)
Credit: Producer

2002
Clay Walker – Christmas (Warner Bros.)
Credit: Producer

2003
Eagles – The Very Best Of (Warner Strategic Marketing)
Credit: String arrangements, Piano

Jeff Foxworthy – The Best of Jeff Foxworthy: Double Wide, Single Minded (Rhino)
Credit: Project Assistant

2004
Jennifer Warnes – Platinum & Gold Collection (Arista)
Credit: Producer

2005
Anne Murray – All of Me (Straightway)
Credit: Producer

2006
Tish Hinojosa – Retrospective (Varese Fontana)
Credit: Producer

Hank Williams, Jr. – That's How They Do It in Dixie: The Essential Collection (Asylum/Curb Records)
Credit: Producer

2007
Crystal Gayle – Greatest Hits (Capitol)
Credit: Producer

2009
Shelly West – The Very Best of Shelly West (Varese Fontana)
Credit: Producer

2011
Bob Seger – Ultimate Hits: Rock and Roll Never Forgets (Capitol)
Credit: String arrangements, Conductor

2017
Eagles – The Studio Albums 1972-1979 (Asylum/Rhino/Warner)
Credit: String arrangements

Dylan Scott – Dylan Scott (Curb)
Credit: Producer

Ruthie Collins – Get Drunk And Cry (Curb)
Credit: Executive Producer

2019
Dylan Scott – Merry Christmas (Curb)
Credit: Producer

2020
Fisk Jubilee Singers – Celebrating Fisk! (Curb)
Credit: Producer
