= Jann Arden discography =

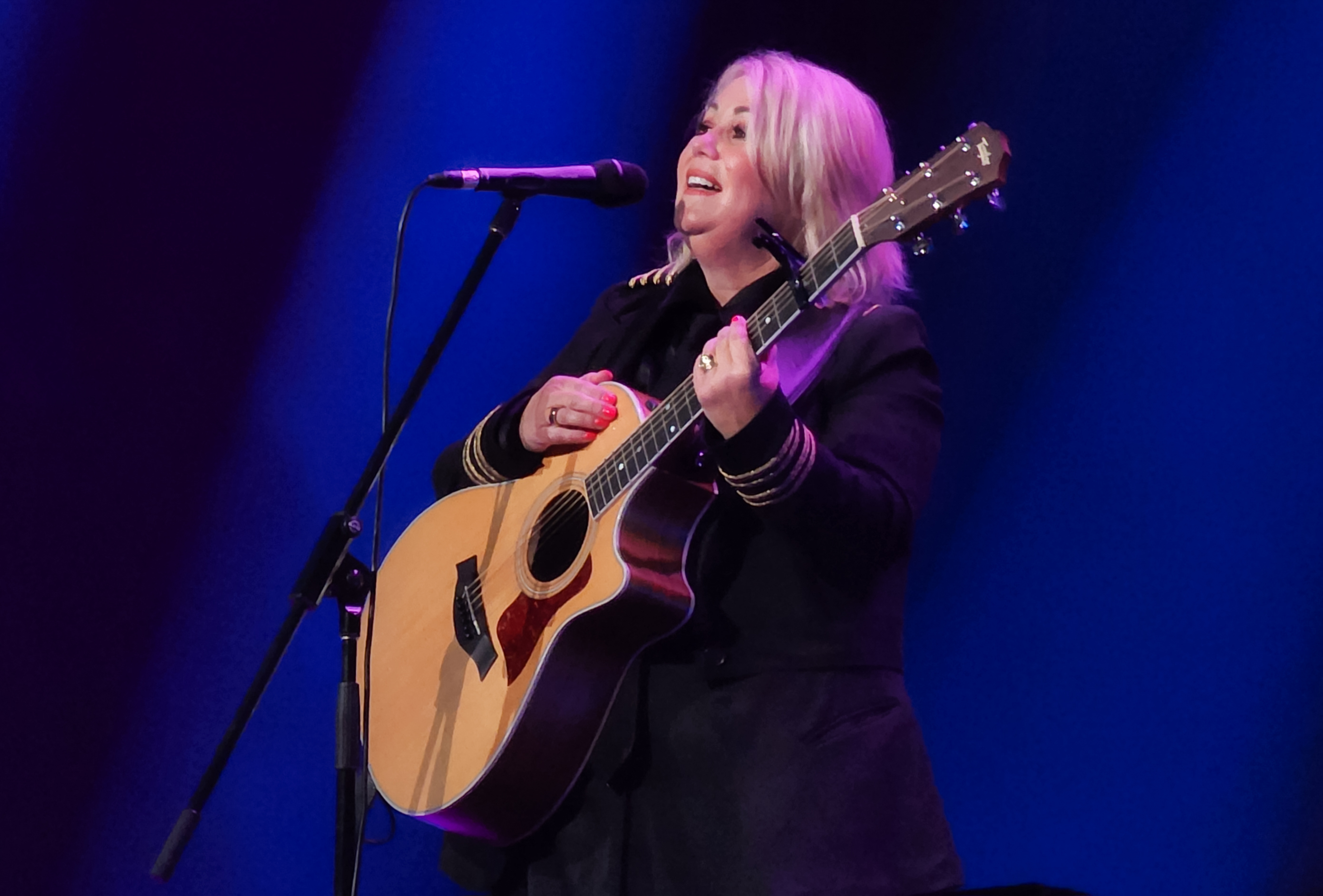
- Jann Arden performing in 2023
- Studio albums: 13
- Live albums: 2
- Compilation albums: 2
- Singles: 41
- Music videos: 13

Jann Arden is a Canadian pop singer. Her discography comprises twelve studio albums, two greatest hits albums, two live albums and forty singles.

== Studio albums ==
=== 1990s ===
Title	Album details	Peak chart positions			Certifications (sales thresholds)
Title	Album details	CAN	AUS	US	Certifications (sales thresholds)
Time for Mercy	Release date: March 5, 1993; Label: A&M	—	—	—	CAN: Platinum
Living Under June	Release date: August 10, 1994; Label: A&M	10	24	76	CAN: 5× Platinum; US: Gold
Happy?	Release date: September 23, 1997; Label: A&M	7	—	—	CAN: 2× Platinum
"—" denotes releases that did not chart

=== 2000s ===
Title	Album details	Peak positions	Certifications (sales thresholds)
Title	Album details	CAN	Certifications (sales thresholds)
Blood Red Cherry	Release date: March 21, 2000; Label: Universal Music Canada	4	CAN: Gold
Love Is the Only Soldier	Release date: September 9, 2003; Label: Universal Music Canada	7	CAN: Gold
Jann Arden	Release date: April 12, 2005; Label: Universal Music Canada	3	CAN: Gold
Uncover Me	Release date: February 6, 2007; Label: Universal Music Canada	3	CAN: Platinum
Free	Release date: September 29, 2009; Label: Universal Music Canada	9	CAN: Gold

=== 2010s and 2020s ===
Title	Album details	Peak positions	Certifications (sales thresholds)	Sales
Title	Album details	CAN	Certifications (sales thresholds)	Sales
Uncover Me 2	Release date: November 1, 2011; Label: Universal Canada	10	CAN: Gold	
Everything Almost	Release date: April 29, 2014; Label: Universal Canada	2		
A Jann Arden Christmas	Release date: October 30, 2015; Label: Universal Canada	5	CAN: Platinum	CAN: 58,000
These Are the Days	Release date: March 16, 2018; Label: Universal Canada	5		
Descendant	Release date: January 28, 2022; Label: Universal Music Canada	69		
Mixtape	Release date: January 31, 2025; Label: Universal Music Canada	—		

== Compilation albums ==
Title	Album details	Peak positions	Certifications (sales thresholds)
Title	Album details	CAN	Certifications (sales thresholds)
Greatest Hurts: The Best of Jann Arden	Release date: October 30, 2001; Label: Universal Canada	13	CAN: Platinum
20th Century Masters: The Millennium Collection	Release date: May 25, 2010; Label: Universal Canada	—	
Hits & Other Gems	Release date: September 25, 2020; Label: Universal Canada; Formats: CD, LP, digital download	—	
"—" denotes releases that did not chart

== Live albums ==
Title	Album details	Peak positions
Title	Album details	CAN
Live with the Vancouver Symphony Orchestra	Release date: October 22, 2002; Label: Universal Canada	30
Spotlight	Release date: November 9, 2010; Label: Universal Canada	43

== Singles ==
=== 1980s and 1990s ===
Year	Title	Peak positions							Album
Year	Title	CAN	CAN AC	CAN Country	AUS	US	US AC	UK	Album
1981	"Never Love a Sailor" (as Jann Richards)	—	—	—	—	—	—	—	—N/a
1993	"Will You Remember Me"	10	—	—	—	—	—	—	Time for Mercy
1993	"I Would Die for You"	13	10	—	—	—	—	—	Time for Mercy
1993	"I'm Not Your Lover"	35	15	—	—	—	—	—	Time for Mercy
1993	"The Way Things Are Going"	—	—	64	—	—	—	—	Time for Mercy
1993	"Time for Mercy"	—	—	—	—	—	—	—	Time for Mercy
1994	"Could I Be Your Girl"	3	1	—	—	—	33	—	Living Under June
1994	"Insensitive"	1	1	—	1	12	4	40	Living Under June
1995	"Wonderdrug"	4	5	—	—	—	—	—	Living Under June
1995	"Unloved" (with Jackson Browne)	8	1	—	—	—	—	—	Living Under June
1995	"Gasoline"	—	—	—	—	—	—	—	Living Under June
1995	"Good Mother"	9	4	—	—	—	—	—	Living Under June
1996	"Looking for It (Finding Heaven)"	7	1	—	—	—	—	—	Living Under June
1997	"The Sound Of"	3	1	—	—	—	—	—	Happy?
1998	"Wishing That"	12	5	—	—	—	—	—	Happy?
1998	"I Know You"	28	4	—	—	—	—	—	Happy?
1998	"Ode to a Friend"	—	19	—	—	—	—	—	Happy?
1999	"Hangin' by a Thread"	—	—	—	—	—	—	—	Happy?
1999	"Weeds"	—	—	—	—	—	—	—	Happy?
1999	"To Sir with Love"	—	—	—	—	—	—	—	Happy?
1999	"Stand by Me"	—	—	—	—	—	—	—	—N/a
"—" denotes releases that did not chart

=== 2000s and 2010s ===
Year	Title	Peak positions		Album
Year	Title	CAN	CAN AC	Album
2000	"Sleepless"	22	4	Blood Red Cherry
2000	"Into the Sun"	—	21	Blood Red Cherry
2000	"Cherry Popsicle"	—	79	Blood Red Cherry
2001	"Waiting in Canada"	—	—	Blood Red Cherry
2001	"Thing for You"	—	—	Greatest Hurts: The Best of Jann Arden
2001	"Never Mind"	—	—	Greatest Hurts: The Best of Jann Arden
2003	"Love Is the Only Soldier"	17	—	Love Is the Only Soldier
2004	"If You Loved Me"	—	10	Love Is the Only Soldier
2005	"Where No One Knows Me"	10	5	Jann Arden
2005	"Willing to Fall Down"	—	12	Jann Arden
2005	"Calling God"	—	—	Jann Arden
2006	"Bring the Boys Home"	10	29	Uncover Me
2007	"At Seventeen"	—	7	Uncover Me
2007	"California Dreamin'"	—	—	Uncover Me
2007	"Son of a Preacher Man"	95	7	Uncover Me
2009	"A Million Miles Away"	76	7	Free
2010	"Free"	—	—	Free
2010	"I Can't Make You Stay"	92	5	Spotlight
2011	"Only the Lonely"	—	—	Uncover Me 2
2014	"You Love Me Back"	—	—	Everything Almost
2014	"Karolina" (with Autumn Hill)	—	—	Everything Almost
2022	"Love Will Be Waiting"	—	—	Descendant
"—" denotes releases that did not chart

== Other singles ==
=== Guest singles ===
Year	Title	Peak chart positions	Album
Year	Title	US Country	Album
2001	"Will You Marry Me"(Alabama featuring Jann Arden)	41	When It All Goes South
2008	"Angel in the Wings" (Olivia Newton-John featuring Jann Arden)	—	A Celebration in Song
2011	"Calgary" (Transit featuring Jann Arden)	—	22

=== Other charted songs ===
Year	Title	Peak positions	Album
Year	Title	CAN AC	Album
2015	"It's Beginning to Look a Lot Like Christmas"	10	A Jann Arden Christmas
2015	"It's the Most Wonderful Time of the Year"	20	A Jann Arden Christmas
2015	"The Christmas Song"	21	A Jann Arden Christmas
2015	"Silver Bells"	22	A Jann Arden Christmas
2015	"Happy Xmas (War Is Over)"	32	A Jann Arden Christmas

== Music videos ==
Year	Title	Director
1993	"Will You Remember Me"	Jeth Weinrich
1993	"I Would Die for You"	Jeth Weinrich
1993	"Time for Mercy"	Jeth Weinrich
1994	"Could I Be Your Girl"	Jeth Weinrich
1994	"Insensitive"	Jeth Weinrich
1995	"Good Mother"	Jeth Weinrich
1995	"Wonderdrug"	Jeth Weinrich
1997	"The Sound Of"	Jeth Weinrich
1998	"Wishing That"	Jeth Weinrich
1999	"Hangin' by a Thread"	Jeth Weinrich
2000	"Sleepless"	Jeth Weinrich
2003	"Love is the Only Soldier"	Andrew MacNaughtan
2009	"Free"	Andrew MacNaughtan
2014	"Karolina" (with Autumn Hill)	Heidi Groff
2015	"Counting Mercies"	Heidi Groff
