= An Intimate Evening with Anne Murray =

Live album by Anne Murray
- Released: September 16, 1997
- Recorded: December 18, 1996
- Venue: Halifax Metro Centre (Halifax, Nova Scotia)
- Studios: DAVE Audio (Toronto, Ontario, Canada)
- Genre: Country
- Length: 54:33
- Label: Capitol
- Producer: Anne Murray

Anne Murray chronology
Anne Murray (1996)	An Intimate Evening with Anne Murray (1997)	What a Wonderful World (1999)

Professional ratings
Review scores
Source	Rating
Allmusic	3/5 stars

An Intimate Evening with Anne Murray is a live album by Canadian Country artist Anne Murray. It was released by Capitol Records on September 16, 1997. The album peaked at number 8 on the RPM Country Albums chart.

== Track listing ==
No.	Title	Writer(s)	Length
1.	"Time Don't Run Out on Me"	Gerry Goffin, Carole King	4:41
2.	"Shame on Me"	Mark Goldenberg, Tom Littlefield	3:17
3.	"That's the Way It Goes"	Kerry Chater, Lynn Gillespie Chater, Cyril Rawson	5:02
4.	"A Love Song"	D. L. George, Kenny Loggins	2:44
5.	"Save the Last Dance for Me"	Doc Pomus, Mort Shuman	2:44
6.	"Somebody's Always Saying Goodbye"	Bob McDill	3:32
7.	"Insensitive" (duet with Jann Arden)	Anne Loree	6:23
8.	"Snowbird" (duet with Jann Arden)	Gene MacLellan	2:54
9.	"Croonin' Medley"	Richard Adler, Robert Allen, Jack Fulton, Al Hoffman, King, Dick Manning, Cole Porter, Chilton Price, Jerry Ross, Lois Steele, John Stewart, Al Stillman	5:52
10.	"What Would It Take" (duet with Bryan Adams)	Bryan Adams, Gretchen Peters	5:24
11.	"You Needed Me"	Randy Goodrum	4:00
12.	"Could I Have This Dance"	Wayland Holyfield, Bob House	5:03
13.	"Danny's Song"	Loggins	2:57
Total length:			54:33

== DVD ==
No.	Title	Writer(s)	Length
1.	"Time Don't Run Out on Me"	Gerry Goffin, Carole King
2.	"Just Another Woman in Love"	Patti Ryan, Wanda Mallette
3.	"What Would it Take (Feat Bryan Adams)"	Bryan Adams
4.	"That's the Way it Goes"	Kerry Chater, Lynn Gillespie Chater, Cyril Rawson
5.	"Danny's Song"	Kenny Loggins
6.	"You Needed Me"	Randy Goodrum
7.	"Croonin' Medley"	Richard Adler, Robert Allen, Jack Fulton, Al Hoffman, King, Dick Manning, Cole Porter, Chilton Price, Jerry Ross, Lois Steele, John Stewart, Al Stillman
8.	"When I Fall in Love"

== Personnel ==
The band

- Anne Murray – vocals, backing vocals (7)
- Brian Gatto – keyboards, harmonica, vocals
- Steve Sexton – keyboards, music director
- Georges Hébert – acoustic guitar, electric guitar
- Aidan Mason – acoustic guitar, electric guitar, vocals
- Peter Bleakney – bass
- Gary Craig – drums
- Debbie Schaal Ankeny – vocals

Special guests

- Jann Arden – vocals (7, 8)
- Bryan Adams – vocals (10), electric guitar (10)

== Production ==
- Anne Murray – producer
- Peter Hamilton – recording
- Doug McClement – recording
- Bruce Drysdale – additional recording material
- Kevin Doyle – mixing
- Paul Offenbacher – mix assistant
- Tom Trafalski – album sequencing
- Bob Ludwig – mastering at Gateway Mastering (Portland, Maine, USA)
- Steve Sexton – production assistant
- James O'Mara – photography
- Bruce Allen – management

== Chart performance ==
Chart (1997)	Peak position
Australian Albums (ARIA)	180
Canadian RPM Country Albums	8
U.S. Billboard Top Country Albums	45
