= Jeth Weinrich =

Canadian documentary filmmaker and music video and commercial director (born 1951)

Jeth Weinrich (born 1961) is a Canadian documentary filmmaker and music video and commercial director.

== Early life ==
Weinrich was born in Pittsburgh in 1961 and grew up in Calgary; he was valedictorian of his graduating class at Viscount Bennett High School in 1978. He played for the Calgary Colts of the Canadian Junior Football League for two years, but his football career was ended by an injury and he temporarily left Calgary to attend the Parsons School of Design in New York.

== Career ==
After working as an assistant to Oliver Stone, Weinrich returned to Calgary and founded Red Motel Pictures. He produced and directed the 1990 documentary Moon of the Desperados, about the American Bullrider, which was nominated for Best Sports Program at the 5th Gemini Awards. For fellow Calgarian Jann Arden, Weinrich began directing music videos. At the Juno Awards of 1994, I Would Die For You won the award for Video of the Year. At the Juno Awards of 1996, Good Mother won the award for Video of the Year. At the Juno Awards of 1995 the video for Insensitive was nominated as Video of the Year, along with another Weinrich video--Blame Your Parents, by 54-40. At the Juno Awards of 1997, Weinrich won a third Video of the Year award for Burned Out Car by Junkhouse. At the Juno Awards of 1999, Arden's Wishing That received a nomination for Video of the Year. At the time, Weinrich was the only person to win the Juno Award for Video of the Year three times.

Weinrich directed his first commercial for Dupont in 1993 about the ingenuity of the American Farmer. He has directed commercials since then for The U.S. Navy, First Bank of America, Cigna, Citizens Bank of Canada, Florida Natural, Alina Health Care, Subway, Sovereign Bank of New York, Florida Natural, and NASCAR Sprint Cup Championship. His Subway spots played during the Athens Olympics and were the biggest media buys for an American commercial to that date. Adweek named him one of the ten most up and coming directors in America for directing commercials, and he is one of a small number of Canadians to win a Clio Award.

In 2003, while producing a documentary about crack addicts, Weinrich himself became seriously addicted to the drug. He was still able to collect 300+ hours of footage and complete the film 1000 Days in 2006, the same year he was able to free himself of his addiction.

In 2007, Weinrich published the book Collected Art an art and photography book chronicling the career of his partner, Sports Illustrated photographer Raphael Mazzucco. He also produced a short film about Mazzucco called Beautiful Deep. His short film Man on a Rock was chosen, with fifty other films from 80,000 entries, to premiere at the Guggenheim Museum in 2009.

His company, Cinema Cartel, and is a human rights-focused company. In 2016, it released the documentary Chitoville, a portrait of the lives of deported LA gang members in Mexico. In 2018, it released The Last Three Days of Lydia Ramirez, a short film that tells the story of a five year-old migrant girl who died of thirst at the Texas borner. A 2018 Kickstarter campaign to raise funds for the production of the film The Invention of Beauty: The Life and Times of Eileen Ford was unsuccessful.

== Filmography ==
Music Videos

- Cover Me - Candlebox 1990
- The Lonesome Kind - Mark Koenig 1991. Winner Best Music Video, Alberta Film & Television Awards
- Pictures From Camp 1993. Winner Special Jury Prize, Best Director/Non-Dramatic, Alberta Film & Television Awards
- Time for Mercy - Jann Arden 1993
- Will You Remember Me - Jann Arden 1993
- Could I Be Your Girl - Jann Arden 1994
- I Would Die For You- Jann Arden 1994
- Blame Your Parents - 54-40 1994
- Ocean Pearl - 54-40 1994
- Insensitive - Jann Arden 1994
- Not Enough - Van Halen 1995
- Wonderdrug - Jann Arden 1995
- Good Mother - Jann Arden 1995
- On and On (Lodestar) - Crash Vegas 1995
- Ly-O-Lay Ale Loya - Sacred Spirit 1996. Winner Best Cinematography/Drama, Best Music Video, Alberta Film & Television Awards
- Wishing That 1997
- The Sound Of 1997
- Hangin' by a Thread 1997
- Sleepless - Jann Arden 2000
- Dreaming with a Broken Heart - John Mayer 2006
- Possibility - Sierra Noble 2008
- Wildflower - Dean Brody 2010. Nominated Canadian Country Music Association Video of the Year
- Trail in Life - Dean Brody 2010. Nominated Canadian Country Music Association Video of the Year
- Waiting - Royal Wood 2010
- I Want Your Love - Royal Wood 2010
- Do You Recall - Royal Wood 2010
- People Know You by Your First Name - Dean Brody 2011
- Tell Me Everything - Adam Cohen 2011
- Hello - Hey Romeo 2011
- Here in My Heart - Jimmy Rankin 2012. Winner Fan's Choice Video of the Year, East Coast Music Awards
- South Cackalack - Juliette Neil 2012
- Fuck All the Perfect People - Chip Taylor & the New Ukrainians 2012
- Open Wide - Jocelyn & Lisa 2012
- Jolene - Belle Starr 2012
- Summerlea - Belle Starr 2012
- New Girl Now - Belle Starr 2012
- Who's Gonna Build That Wall - Chip Taylor & the New Ukrainians 2012
- Hope & Gasoline - Beverley Mahood 2013
- Merry F'n Christma - Chip Taylor & the New Ukrainians 2014
- Lived and Died Alone - Lindi Ortega 2014
- Send Love - Chris Day 2015
- A Woman and A Song - Jake Mathews 2015
- Senorita Falling Down - Chip Taylor & the New Ukrainians 2017
- Highlander - Jimmy Rankin 2018
- Been Away - Jimmy Rankin 2018
- Haul Away the Whale - Jimmy Rankin 2018

Documentaries & Short Films

- Moon of the Desperados - documentary, 1990. Winner Best of the Festival, Best Documentary, Best Direction, Best Script, Alberta Film & Television Awards
- Heartland : A Film About the Young - documentary 1992. Winner Best of the Festival, Best Documentary, Best Editing, Best Direction, Alberta Film & Television Awards
- Gasoline - short film, co-production 1992. Winner Best Short, Alberta Film & Television Awards
- Test Pattern - Sonia Dada - short films 2004
- 1000 Days - documentary 2006
- Beautiful Deep - short film 2008
- Man on a Rock - short film 2009
- Chitoville - documentary 2016
- The Last Three Days of Lydia Ramirez - short film 2018
- Cover Me Up - Morgan Wallen - short film 2021
