= Living Under June =

Studio album by Jann Arden
- Released: August 10, 1994 (Canada); February 28, 1995 (U.S.)
- Studios: Groove Masters, Santa Monica, CA
- Genre: Pop
- Length: 49:35
- Label: A&M
- Producers: Ed Cherney, Jann Arden

Jann Arden chronology
| Time for Mercy (1993) | Living Under June (1994) | Happy? (1997) |

Singles from Living Under June
- 1. "Could I Be Your Girl" Released: April 11, 1995 (U.S.); 2. "Insensitive" Released: October 24, 1994 (U.S.)

Professional ratings
Review scores
| Source | Rating |
|---|---|
| AllMusic | 4/5 stars |

Living Under June is the second album by the Canadian singer-songwriter Jann Arden, released in 1994.

"Could I Be Your Girl", "Insensitive" and "Good Mother" were all significant hits for Jann in Canada, with "Wonderdrug", "Unloved" and "Looking for It (Finding Heaven)" also becoming Canadian adult-contemporary hits. "Insensitive" was Jann's biggest hit internationally. The song entered the Top 40 in several countries, including Italy and the United States (No. 12 on the Billboard Hot 100). In the U.S., "Could I Be Your Girl" was also a minor adult contemporary chart hit (No. 33). Total worldwide sales for this album come to 1.3 million, with 600,000 Canadian, and 500,000 US.

The video for "Good Mother", directed by Jeth Weinrich, won the Juno Award for Video of the Year at the 1996 Juno Awards. Weinrich also directed the video for "Insensitive", which was a nominee for the same award, but didn't win, at the 1995 Juno Awards.

== Production ==
The album was produced by Ed Cherney and Arden. Most of the songs were written in a Calgary basement, where Jann lived under her landlady, June. Jackson Browne duets with Jann on "Unloved". Anne Loree wrote "Insensitive". Kenny Aronoff played drums on the album.

== Track listing ==
All songs written by Jann Arden, except where noted.

1. "Could I Be Your Girl" – 4:48
2. "Demolition Love" – 4:04
3. "Looking for It (Finding Heaven)" (Arden, Bob Foster) – 3:53
4. "Insensitive" (Anne Loree) – 4:16
5. "Gasoline" – 4:35
6. "Wonderdrug" (Arden, Mike Lent) – 3:35
7. "Living Under June" – 4:02
8. "Unloved" (with Jackson Browne) – 4:14
9. "Good Mother" (Arden, Foster) – 4:58
10. "It Looks Like Rain" (Arden, Foster) – 4:53
11. "I Would Die for You" (Bonus track on international release) – 4:35

"I Would Die for You" was a significant single from Jann's previous album, Time for Mercy, and doesn't appear on this album's original version.

== Personnel ==
- Jann Arden – acoustic guitar, vocals
- Bob Foster – acoustic and electric guitars
- David Resnik – acoustic and electric guitars
- Jeffrey (C. J.) Vanston – synthesizers, Wurlitzer and acoustic piano, Hammond B-3 organ, drum programming
- Mike Lent – bass guitar, acoustic guitar ("Wonderdrug")
- Kenny Aronoff – drums, percussion
- Jackson Browne – duet on ("Unloved")
- Ed Cherney – backing vocals ("Looking for It (Finding Heaven)")
- Lin Elder, Dillon O'Brian – backing vocals

Production

- Arranged by Jann Arden, Ed Cherney and Jeffrey Vanston, with vocal backing arranged by Dillon O'Brien and band charts by Peggy Sandvig
- Neil MacGonigill: Executive Producer
- Produced by Jann Arden and Ed Cherney; production assisted by Edd Kolakowski; assisted by Carrie McConkey; production co-ordination by Marsha Burns
- Recording Engineers: Ed Cherney and Duane Seykora; assisted by Raymond Taylor-Smith and Ronnie Rivera
- Mixed by Ed Cherney
- Mastered by Doug Sax
- Piano and guitar technician: Edd Kolakowski
- Artwork and design by Jann Arden, Jeth Weinrich and Margo McKee, with photography by Jeth Weinrich

== Charts ==
=== Weekly charts ===
Weekly chart performance for Living Under June
| Chart (1995) | Peak position |
|---|---|
| Australian Albums (ARIA) | 24 |
| Canada Top Albums/CDs (RPM) | 10 |
| US Billboard 200 | 76 |

=== Year-end charts ===
Year-end chart performance for Living Under June
| Chart (1995) | Position |
|---|---|
| Canada Top Albums/CDs (RPM) | 19 |

== Certifications ==
Certifications for Living Under June
| Region | Certification | Certified units/sales |
|---|---|---|
| Canada (Music Canada) | 5× Platinum | 500,000^{^} |
| United States (RIAA) | Gold | 500,000^{^} |
^{^} Shipments figures based on certification alone.
