= Juno Awards of 1996 =

Canadian music awards ceremony

- Date: 10 March 1996
- Venue: Copps Coliseum, Hamilton, Ontario
- Hosted by: Anne Murray

Television/radio coverage
- Network: CBC

The Juno Awards of 1996, representing Canadian music industry achievements of the previous year, were awarded on 10 March 1996 in Hamilton, Ontario at a ceremony in the Copps Coliseum. Anne Murray was the host for the ceremonies, which were broadcast on CBC Television.

Quebec-based independent classical label Analekta Records boycotted the Junos after failing to receive a Juno nomination after attempts for five years. Analekta claimed its sales were twice that of CBC Records.

Several record stores such as CD Plus, HMV, Sunrise and Music World also intended to boycott the Junos because competing music retailer Columbia House had signed on as a Juno advertiser.

Nominations were announced 31 January 1996. Prominent nominees were Alanis Morissette and Shania Twain who had recent internationally successful albums who both won Grammy Awards on 28 February 1996. Alanis Morissette won in five Juno categories, becoming this year's major winner.

== Nominees and winners ==
=== Levi's Entertainer of the Year ===
Presented by David Clayton-Thomas, Denny Doherty, John Kay, Domenic Troiano and Zal Yanovsky, this award was chosen by a national poll rather than by Juno organisers CARAS.

Winner: Shania Twain

Other Nominees:

- Bryan Adams
- Jann Arden
- Alanis Morissette
- The Tragically Hip

=== Best Female Vocalist ===
Presented by Russell DeCarle and Buffy Sainte-Marie.

Winner: Alanis Morissette

Other Nominees:

- Susan Aglukark
- Celine Dion
- Rita MacNeil
- Shania Twain

=== Best Male Vocalist ===
Presented by Susan Aglukark and Kim Mitchell.

Winner: Colin James

Other Nominees:

- Tom Cochrane
- Charlie Major
- Mario Pelchat
- Neil Young

=== Best New Solo Artist ===
Winner: Ashley MacIsaac

Other Nominees:

- Lara Fabian
- Amanda Marshall
- Laura Smith
- Kim Stockwood

=== Group of the Year ===
This award was presented by Canadian Music Hall of Fame inductees The Diamonds and The Crew Cuts

Winner: Blue Rodeo

Other Nominees:

- The Headstones
- Odds
- The Rankin Family
- The Tea Party

=== Best New Group ===
Winner: Philosopher Kings

Other Nominees:

- Hemingway Corner
- Rainbow Butt Monkeys
- Rymes with Orange
- Sandbox

=== Songwriter of the Year ===
Winner: Alanis Morissette

Other Nominees:

- Bryan Adams
- Anne Loree
- Odds
- Shania Twain

=== Best Country Female Vocalist ===
Presented by George Fox and Charlie Major, this award was accepted on Twain's behalf by her sister Carrie-Anne because she was too sick to attend.

Winner: Shania Twain

Other Nominees:

- Lisa Brokop
- Cindy Church
- Patricia Conroy
- Michelle Wright

=== Best Country Male Vocalist ===
Winner: Charlie Major

Other Nominees:

- George Fox
- Jason McCoy
- Don Neilson
- Calvin Wiggett

=== Best Country Group or Duo ===
Winner: Prairie Oyster

Other Nominees:

- Farmer's Daughter
- Quartette
- The Johner Brothers
- The Rankin Family

=== Best Instrumental Artist ===
Winner: Liona Boyd

Other Nominees:

- Richard Abel
- George Amatino
- Hennie Bekker
- André Gagnon

=== Best Producer ===
Winner: Michael Phillip Wojewoda, "End of the World" by The Waltons; "Beaton's Delight" by Ashley MacIsaac

Other Nominees:

- Bryan Adams with co-producer Robert John "Mutt" Lange, "Have You Ever Really Loved a Woman" by Bryan Adams
- David Foster (with co-producer Madonna), "You'll See (Something to Remember)" by Madonna; "I Can Love You Like That (And the Music Speaks)" by All-4-One
- Chad Irschick, "O Siem" by Susan Aglukark
- David Tyson, "Beautiful Goodbye" and "Birmingham" by Amanda Marshall

=== Best Recording Engineer ===
Winner: Chad Irschick, "O Siem" by Susan Aglukark

Other Nominees:

- Lenny DeRose, "Faith" and "Their Lights" by Crash Vegas
- Kevin Doyle, "Here, There and Everywhere" by John McDermott
- Rob Heany, "Alegria" by Cirque du Soleil
- Ian Terry, "The Way You Look Tonight" by Oliver Jones and "Canon" by D.D. Jackson

=== Canadian Music Hall of Fame ===
Winners: David Clayton-Thomas, Denny Doherty, John Kay, Domenic Troiano, Zal Yanovsky

=== Walt Grealis Special Achievement Award ===
Winner: Ronnie Hawkins

== Nominated and winning albums ==
=== Best Album ===
Presented by Deborah Cox and Robbie Robertson.

Winner: Jagged Little Pill, Alanis Morissette

Other Nominees:

- D'eux, Celine Dion
- Ragged Ass Road, Tom Cochrane
- The Woman in Me, Shania Twain
- This Child, Susan Aglukark

=== Best Children's Album ===
Winner: Celery Stalks At Midnight, Al Simmons

Other Nominees:

- Hallelujah Handel!, Susan Hammond, Classical Kids
- The Keeper, Will Millar
- Philharmonic Fool, Rick Scott
- Raffi Radio, Raffi

=== Best Classical Album (Solo or Chamber Ensemble) ===
Winner: Alkan: Grande Sonate/Sonatine/ Le Festin d'Esope, piano Marc-Andre Hamelin

Other Nominees:

- Bach: Violin Concertos, Jeanne Lamon, Tafelmusik
- Debussy: Preludes, Livres 1 and 2, piano Francine Kay
- Quartet for the End of Time, Amici Ensemble with violin Shmuel Askenasi
- Suite hébraïque, violin Jacques Israelievitch, piano John Greer

=== Best Classical Album (Large Ensemble) ===
Winner: Shostakovich: Symphonies 5 & 9, Montreal Symphony Orchestra, conductor Charles Dutoit

Other Nominees:

- Debussy: Children's Corner, Montreal Symphony Orchestra
- Mendelssohn: Symphonies 1 and 5, Hebrides Overture, Calgary Philharmonic Orchestra
- Purcell: Ayres for the Theatre, Tafelmusik
- Tchaikovsky and Sibelius: Violin Concertos, Leila Josefowicz, The Academy of St. Martin in the Fields

=== Best Classical Album (Vocal or Choral Performance) ===
Winner: Ben Heppner Sings Richard Strauss, tenor Ben Heppner, The Toronto Symphony Orchestra, conductor Andrew Davis

Other Nominees:

- Great Tenor Arias, Ben Heppner, Munich Radio Orchestra
- Healey Willan: An Apostrophe to the Heavenly Hosts, Vancouver Chamber Choir
- J.S. Bach: Secular Cantatas, Vol. 1, Dorothea Röschmann, Hugues Saint-Gelais, Kevin McMillan, Les Violons du Roy
- Ravel: L'enfant et les sortileges, Sheherazade, Montreal Symphony Orchestra and Choir

=== Best Album Design ===
Winner: Tom Wilson and Alex Wittholz, Birthday Boy

Other Nominees:

- David Andoff, Derek Shapton, Hi, How Are You Today? by Ashley MacIsaac
- David Andoff, Paul van Dongen, Tara McVicar, Bootsauce by Bootsauce
- Steven R. Gilmore, Anthony Artiaga, Good Weird Feeling, Odds
- Kathi Prosser, Peter Horvath, Dragonfly by Mae Moore

=== Best Selling Album (Foreign or Domestic) ===
Winner: No Need to Argue, The Cranberries

Other Nominees:

- D'eux, Celine Dion
- Dangerous Minds
- Hell Freezes Over, Eagles
- The Woman in Me, Shania Twain

=== Best Blues/Gospel Album ===
Winner: That River, Jim Byrnes

Other Nominees:

- Big City Blues, Sue Foley
- Rites of Passage, Georgette Fry
- Urban Blues re: Newell, King Biscuit Boy
- When the Sun Goes Down, The Sidemen

=== Best Mainstream Jazz Album ===
Winner: Vernal Fields, Ingrid Jensen

Other Nominees:

- A Timeless Place, Jeri Brown
- Basso Continuo, Normand Guilbeault Ensemble
- From Lush to Lively, Oliver Jones
- Peace Song, D.D. Jackson

=== Best Contemporary Jazz Album ===
Winner: NOJO, Neufeld-Occhipinti Jazz Orchestra

Other Nominees:

- Frontier Tunes, The Merlin Factor
- Lucky to be Me, Carol Welsman
- Rendez-vous Brazil Cuba, Jane Bunnett
- Touch, Rich Shadrach Lazar and Montuno Police

=== Best Selling Francophone Album ===
Winner: D'eux, Celine Dion

Other Nominees:

- Beau dommage, Beau Dommage
- Bohemienne, Marjo
- Carpe diem, Lara Fabian
- C'est la vie, Mario Pelchat

=== Rock Album of the Year ===
Presented by Burton Cummings and Alannah Myles.

Winner: Jagged Little Pill, Alanis Morissette

Other Nominees:

- The Edges of Twilight, The Tea Party
- Good Weird Feeling, Odds
- Mirror Ball, Neil Young
- Teeth and Tissue, Headstones

=== Best Roots or Traditional Album - Group ===
Winner: Gypsies & Lovers, The Irish Descendants

Other Nominees:

- Inside the Dreaming, The Wyrd Sisters
- Late As Usual, The Paperboys
- Night Visions, Orealis
- Up, Great Big Sea

=== Best Roots or Traditional Album - Solo ===
Winner: Ashley MacIsaac, Hi™ How Are You Today?

Other Nominees:

- Susan Crowe, This Far From Home
- James Keelaghan, A Recent Future
- Danielle Martineau, Autrement
- Laura Smith, B'tween the Earth and My Soul

=== Best Alternative Album ===
Winner: What Fresh Hell is This?, Art Bergmann

Other Nominees:

- Fluke, Rusty
- Kombinator, The Inbreds
- Mock Up, Scale Down, The Super Friendz
- Somebody Spoke, Hardship Post

== Nominated and winning releases ==
=== Single of the Year ===
Winner: "You Oughta Know", Alanis Morissette

Other Nominees:

- "Any Man of Mine", Shania Twain
- "Have You Ever Really Loved a Woman", Bryan Adams
- "Insensitive", Jann Arden
- "O Siem", Susan Aglukark

=== Best Classical Composition ===
Winner: Concerto For Violin And Orchestra, Andrew P. MacDonald, David Stewart, Manitoba Chamber Orchestra

Other Nominees:

- "I Think That I Shall Never See...", Chan Ka Nin for Amici
- "Music for Heaven and Earth", Alexina Louie for Esprit Orchestra
- "Piano Concerto", Glenn Buhr for Christina Petrowksa, Winnipeg Symphony Orchestra
- "Touchings", Harry Freedman for Nexus, The Esprit Orchestra

=== Best Music of Aboriginal Canada Recording ===
Winner: ETSI Shon "Grandfather Song", Jerry Alfred and the Medicine Beat

Other Nominees:

- Dancing Around the World, Red Bull
- Message, Wapistan
- Sacred Ground, Jess Lee
- This Child, Susan Aglukark

=== Best Rap Recording ===
Winner: "E-Z On Tha Motion", Ghetto Concept

Other Nominees:

- "Drama", Da Grassroots with Elemental
- "The Legacy", UBAD
- "Still Caught Up", Saukrates
- "360 Degrees", Cipher

=== Best R&B/Soul Recording ===
Presented by Ronnie Hawkins and Colin James.

Winner: Deborah Cox, Deborah Cox

Other Nominees:

- Absolute, jacksoul
- Feel the Good Times, Charlene Smith
- Memories of the SoulShack Survivors, Bass is Base
- The Philosopher Kings, The Philosopher Kings

=== Best Reggae Recording ===
Winner: "Now and Forever", Sattalites

Other Nominees:

- "Real Personal", Tanya Mullings
- "Si Wi Dem Nuh Know We", Snow
- "Something Real", Lazo
- "Waking Up the Dream", Errol Blackwood

=== Best Global Album ===
Winner: Music From Africa, Takadja

Other Nominees:

- Alegria, Cirque du Soleil
- Jmpn For Joy, Punjabi by Nature
- Vamo a Pambicha, Papo Ross and Orquesta Pambiche
- When Ahab Met Moishe, The Angstones

=== Best Dance Recording ===
Winner: "A Deeper Shade Of Love (Extended Mix)", Camille

Other Nominees:

- "Come Into My Life (Extended Mix)", JLM
- "Get Away (Stonebridge and Nick Nice Club Mix)", Shauna Davis
- "Never Let You Go (Tempered Club Mix)", Temperance
- "Take Control (Matrix Airplay Edit)", BKS

=== Best Video ===
Presented by Amanda Marshall and The Odds.

Winner: Jeth Weinrich, "Good Mother" by Jann Arden

Other Nominees:

- Alain DesRochers, "O Siem" by Susan Aglukark
- Tim Hamilton, "The Ballad of Peter Pumpkinhead" by Crash Test Dummies
- Stephen Scott, "Freedom" by Colin James
- Curtis Wehrfritz, "Sister Awake" by The Tea Party
