= Anne Murray (album) =

Studio album by Anne Murray
- Released: August 6, 1996
- Studios: Phase One Studios and Reaction Studios (Toronto, Ontario, Canada); Groove Masters (Santa Monica, California, USA); Brooklyn Recording Studios and Record Plant (Los Angeles, California, USA); Ultrasonic Studios (New Orleans, Louisiana, USA); Warehouse Mobile (Provence, France)
- Genre: Country
- Length: 52:07
- Labels: EMI (Canada); SBK (US)
- Producer: Ed Cherney

Anne Murray chronology
The Best…So Far (1994)	Anne Murray (1996)	An Intimate Evening with Anne Murray (1997)

Singles from Anne Murray
- 1. "That's What My Love Is For" Released: 1996; 2. "That's the Way It Goes" Released: 1997

Professional ratings
Review scores
Source	Rating
Allmusic	2.5/5 stars

Anne Murray is the twenty-eighth studio album by Canadian country vocalist Anne Murray. It was released by SBK Records on August 6, 1996. It was Murray's last album of all new material (subsequent albums consisted of Christian music, country covers, standards and remakes of old songs). The album peaked at number 10 on the RPM Country Albums chart.

== Track listing ==
No.	Title	Writer(s)	Length
1.	"That's the Way It Goes"	Kerry Chater, Lynn Gillespie Chater, Cyril Rawson	4:23
2.	"That's What My Love Is For" (Duet with Aaron Neville)	Dave Pickell, Amy Sky	3:58
3.	"What Would It Take" (Duet with Bryan Adams)	Bryan Adams, Gretchen Peters	4:35
4.	"Me Too"	Randy Goodrum, John Barlow Jarvis	3:39
5.	"I Know Too Much"	Suzy Ragsdale, Verlon Thompson	3:51
6.	"Fools Like Me"	Gloria Sklerov	3:31
7.	"Trust Me Baby, This Is Love"	Dean McTaggart, David Tyson	4:43
8.	"The Other Side"	Joie Scott, Richard Wold	4:09
9.	"Until I Was Loved by You"	J. D. Martin, Christopher Ward	4:13
10.	"Highway, Highway"	Stephen Allen Davis	4:21
11.	"Shame on Me"	Mark Goldenberg, Tom Littlefield	3:43
12.	"Missing You"	Jann Arden	3:14
13.	"Good Again"	Ian Thomas	3:47

== Personnel ==
- Anne Murray – vocals, backing vocals (5, 11)
- Doug Riley – acoustic piano (1–4, 6), Hammond B3 organ (1–4, 7, 8, 13), Fender Rhodes (7)
- C.J. Vanston – synthesizers (2, 4, 6, 8, 10, 13), Wurlitzer electric piano (5), Hammond organ (5, 9, 11), acoustic piano (8, 11), keyboards (9)
- Mark Goldenberg – electric tremolo guitar (1, 2), acoustic guitar (2, 4, 5, 8), electric baritone guitar (4, 5), electric guitar (5, 6, 9, 11), baritone guitar (8), lap steel guitar (8)
- Bob Mann – acoustic guitar (1, 3, 6, 7, 12, 13), electric guitar (2, 3, 6, 7), electric guitar solo (4), acoustic guitar solo (10)
- Mike "Pepe" Francis – electric guitar (2, 3, 6, 7, 13), acoustic guitar (10)
- Bryan Adams – electric tremolo guitar (3), backing vocals (3)
- Keith Scott – electric guitar solo (3)
- Greg Leisz – dobro (5), pedal steel guitar (6), electric guitar (9), lap steel guitar (11)
- David Resnik – electric guitar (7, 8), Hawaiian slide guitar (13)
- Johnny Lee Schell – electric guitar solo (7)
- Jim Pirie – acoustic guitar (10)
- James "Hutch" Hutchinson – bass (1–11, 13)
- Ricky Fataar – drums (1–4, 6–8, 13)
- Russ Kunkel – drums (5, 9, 11)
- Luis Conte – percussion (1, 2, 4, 6–8), bongos (13), shaker (13), surdo (13)
- Brian Leonard – tambourine (1, 3, 13), hand drum (13), tamborim (13)
- Debra Dobkin – percussion (5, 9, 11)
- Glen Clark – harmonica (1), baritone harmonica (10)
- The Texicali Horns (1, 13):
  - David Wolford – baritone saxophone
  - Joe Sublett – tenor saxophone
  - Darrell Leonard – trumpet
- Shirley Eikhard – backing vocals (1, 7, 10)
- Don Neilson – backing vocals (1, 7)
- Aaron Neville – vocals (2)
- Valerie Carter – backing vocals (5, 9, 11)
- Willie Greene Jr. – backing vocals (5)
- Dillon O'Brian – backing vocals (5, 9, 11)
- Jann Arden – backing vocals (8)
- Dawn Langstroth – backing vocals (8)

Handclaps on "I Know Too Much"

- Valerie Carter, Debra Dobkin, Mark Goldenberg, Willie Greene Jr., James "Hutch" Hutchinson, Russ Kunkel, Greg Leisz, Cynthia McReynolds, Anne Murray, Dillon O'Brian and C.J. Vanston

Strings on "Highway, Highway"

- Doug Riley – arrangements and conductor
- Adele Armin, Richard Armin, Mari Barrard, Terrance Helmer, Ronald Mah, Young-Dae Park, Mark Skazanetsky, Vera Tarnowsky, Jim Wallemberg and Laura Wilcox – string players

== Production ==
- Ed Cherney – producer, recording, mixing
- Duane Seykora – recording
- Shawn Edmonson – recording assistant
- Tom Heron – recording assistant
- Eric Ratz – recording assistant
- Bob Salcedo – recording assistant
- David Farrell – additional vocal engineer
- Kevin Doyle – overdub recording
- Olle Romo – overdub recording
- Tom Banghart – overdub assistant
- Paul Offenbacher – overdub assistant
- Robbes Stieglitz – overdub assistant
- Doug Sax – mastering at The Mastering Lab (Hollywood, California)
- James O'Mara – art direction, photography
- Helios – layout design, cloud photography
- Bruce Allen – management

== Chart performance ==
Chart (1996)	Peak position
Canadian RPM Country Albums	10
Canadian RPM Top Albums	48
Australia (ARIA Charts)	6
