= Uncover Me 2 =

Studio album by Jann Arden
- Released: November 1, 2011
- Genre: Adult alternative
- Label: Universal Music Canada
- Producer: Jann Arden, Bob Rock

Jann Arden chronology
Free (2009)	Uncover Me 2 (2011)	Everything Almost (2014)

Uncover Me 2 is the ninth studio album from Canadian singer-songwriter Jann Arden. It is her second album of covers, the first being 2007's Uncover Me, which was a commercial and critical success. The album was released simultaneously with her memoir entitled "Falling Backwards" on November 1, 2011.

== Track listing ==
1. "Last Night I Dreamt That Somebody Loved Me" (The Smiths)
2. "You Don't Own Me" (Lesley Gore)
3. "In My Room" (The Beach Boys)
4. "Que Sera Sera" (Doris Day)
5. "Love Hurts" (The Everly Brothers)
6. "Dreams" (Fleetwood Mac)
7. "Mr. McLennen"
8. "This Girl's In Love With You" (Herb Alpert)
9. "Glory of Love" (Benny Goodman)
10. "Only the Lonely" (The Motels)
11. "Misty Blue"
12. "Is That All There Is?" (Peggy Lee)

== Chart performance ==
Chart (2011)	Peak position
Canadian Albums (Billboard)	10

== Certifications ==
Region	Certification
Canada (Music Canada)	Gold
