= Arctic rose =

Arctic rose may refer to:

- Arctic Rose (album) by Susan Aglukark
- Arctic Rose, fishing vessel lost in the Bering Sea in April 2001 with 15 dead; see Seattle Fishermen's Memorial
- Rhodiola rosea, a perennial herbaceous plant used in traditional medicine, unrelated to roses in the genus Rosa
- Rosa acicularis, a shrub in the genus Rosa
