= Arctic Rose (album) =

Studio album by Susan Aglukark
- Released: 1992
- Genre: Folk, pop, country
- Length: 36:34
- Label: EMI
- Producer: Chad Irschick; Randall Prescott

Susan Aglukark chronology
Dreams for You (1990)	Arctic Rose (1992)	Christmas (1993)

Professional ratings
Review scores
Source	Rating
AllMusic	4/5 stars

Arctic Rose is the 1992 album by Canadian singer-songwriter Susan Aglukark. Initially released independently with very little distribution outside the Northwest Territories, the album was rereleased across Canada in 1995 following Aglukark's commercial breakthrough with This Child.

The album won the Best Music of Aboriginal Canada Recording award at the Juno Awards of 1995.

== Track listing ==
1. "Arctic Rose" (Susan Aglukark, Randall Prescott, Terry Tufts) – 4:07
2. "Song of the Land" (Barry Brown, Eric Emerson, Bob Morrison) – 4:03
3. "Still Running" (Aglukark, Charlie Major) – 4:11
4. "Wonderin' Child" (Jon Park-Wheeler) – 3:26
5. "Learn to Love Yourself" (Aglukark, Park-Wheeler, Prescott) – 3:06
6. "Searching" (Agluark, Crosley) – 3:34
7. "Anger and Tears" (Aglukark, Park-Wheeler) – 3:49
8. "Rollin' On" (Agluark, Major) – 2:49
9. "Mama's Prayers" (Aglukark, Brown) – 2:52
10. "Amazing Grace" (Aglukark, John Newton) – 4:37
