= Nordic Digital Rights and Equality Foundation =

Nordic digital gender equality nonprofit

Nordic Digital Rights and Equality Foundation (abbreviated NORDREF) is a Nordic non-profit organization focused on issues related to digital rights, equality and online safety. The organization was founded in 2020 and works across several Nordic countries, including Sweden, Denmark, Finland and Iceland.

The foundation conducts research, produces educational resources, and engages in public policy discussions concerning the societal impacts of digital technologies, with a particular focus on online abuse and technology-facilitated gender-based violence (TFGBV).

== History ==
NORDREF was established in 2020 amid increasing public concern in the Nordic region regarding online harassment, non-consensual image sharing and other forms of digital abuse. According to its website, the organization seeks to "work towards equality and democracy in the Nordic region by developing and sharing knowledge about digital rights and responsibilities, while protecting people's right to safely partake in discussions and other activities online."

Since its founding, NORDREF has collaborated with researchers, civil society organizations, and public institutions in the Nordic countries.

== Activities ==
=== Research ===
NORDREF has participated in research initiatives examining patterns of online abuse and digital harm, particularly forms of abuse that disproportionately affect women and girls. Some of this work has involved cooperation with Nordic research institutions and equality-focused organizations, such as Gothenburg University, Samtökin '78 and others.

=== Education and public engagement ===
The organization develops educational materials and public awareness initiatives related to digital rights, online safety, and democratic participation in digital environments. In 2022, NORDREF hosted a Nordic Talk about sexual privacy in digital spaces, with speakers including the Minister of Industry and Innovation of Iceland and Meta's Head of Women's Safety. Since 2023, many of NORDREF's initiatives have been youth-focused, addressing digital citizenship and online wellbeing.

=== Policy engagement ===
NORDREF contributes to discussions on digital policy at Nordic and European levels, with co-founder Thordis Elva having addressed the Nordic Council, the Council of Europe and the EU on behalf of the organisation.

== Organization and structure ==
The Nordic Digital Rights and Equality Foundation is a non-profit foundation operating in the Nordic region. Its administrative base is located in Sweden. The organization works through partnerships with civil society organizations, academic institutions, and public authorities, with funding from the Nordic Gender Equality Fund, the Erasmus program and elsewhere.

== See also ==
- Digital rights
- Online harassment
- Revenge porn
- Gender equality
