= Susan Aglukark =

Canadian singer (born 1967)

Susan Aglukark ᓲᓴᓐ ᐊᒡᓘᒃᑲᖅ
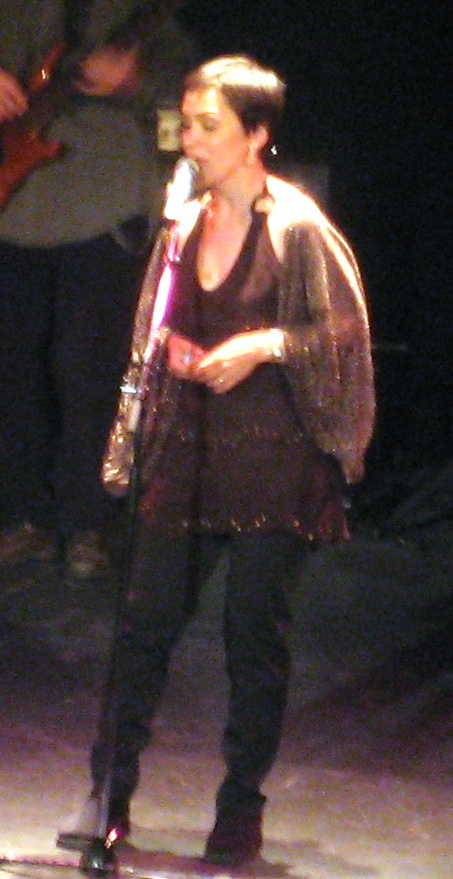
- Susan Aglukark at Moose Jaw, Saskatchewan, June 2007

Background information
- Born: 27 January 1967 (age 59); Churchill, Manitoba, Canada
- Origin: Arviat, Nunavut, Canada
- Genres: Folk, pop, country
- Occupation: Singer-songwriter
- Instrument: Vocals
- Years active: 1992–present
- Label: EMI
- Website: susanaglukark.com

Susan Aglukark (Inuktitut syllabics: ᓲᓴᓐ ᐊᒡᓘᒃᑲᖅ suusan agluukkaq; born 27 January 1967) is a Canadian singer whose blend of Inuit folk music traditions with country and pop songwriting has made her a major recording star in Canada. Her most successful song/single is "O Siem", which reached No. 1 on the Canadian country and adult contemporary charts in 1995. Overall, she has released seven studio albums and has won three Juno Awards.

== Biography ==
=== Early life ===
Aglukark was born in Churchill, Manitoba, and raised in Arviat, Northwest Territories (now in Nunavut). She endured sexual abuse as a child and has been vocal about this issue in some of the first nations in Northern Ontario. After graduating from high school, she worked in Ottawa, Ontario, as a linguist with the Department of Indian & Northern Affairs, and then returned to the Northwest Territories to work as an executive assistant with the Inuit Tapirisat of Canada.

=== Career ===
While working with the Inuit Tapirisat, she began to perform as a singer, and quickly became a popular performer in Inuit communities. She soon attracted the attention of the Canadian Broadcasting Corporation, who included her in a compilation of Arctic performers. In 1992, she released an independent album, Arctic Rose. The following year, she signed to a major record label, releasing an album of Christmas music that year.

Aglukark has also acted as spokesperson for several non-profit groups working with aboriginal and Inuit youth, notably through her writing workshops for Attawapiskat First Nation youth and her involvement in Northern Canada's food crisis. However, she has said that while she is proud to be a role model for aboriginal people in Canada, she ultimately sees herself as an artist with a universal message of self-respect and strength to which she hopes that people of all cultural backgrounds can relate.

=== This Child ===
This Child, released in 1995, became her breakthrough album. The first single from that album, "O Siem", went to number one on the Canadian adult contemporary and country charts that year, making Aglukark the first Inuk performer to have a Top 40 hit. "Hina Na Ho (Celebration)" and "Breakin' Down" became hit singles as well. The album was eventually certified triple platinum (300,000 copies sold) in Canada.

=== Unsung Heroes ===
In 1999, Aglukark released Unsung Heroes, which spawned another pop hit with "One Turn Deserves Another." This album also included "Turn of the Century," a song about the creation of Nunavut. In 2003, she released Big Feeling.

She sometimes deals with painful subjects in her songs. "Kathy" is about her niece who died by suicide, and "Still Running" is about the trauma of sexual abuse. Aglukark has also recorded a version of "Amazing Grace" in Inuktitut.

Her song "Never Be the Same" was featured on Dawson's Creek in Episode No. 3–14 ("Valentine's Day Massacre"), as well as her song "One Turn Deserves Another" in Episode No. 3–15 ("Crime And Punishment").

Aglukark's second holiday album, Dreaming of Home, was released in 2013.

She currently resides in Oakville, Ontario.

== Awards and recognition ==
In 2004, Aglukark was awarded an honorary DFA from the University of Lethbridge. She was named an officer of the Order of Canada in 2005, and in the same year received an honorary LL.D. degree from the University of Alberta. In the summer of 2006, she performed nightly in the evening grandstand show at the Calgary Stampede.

- 1994: winner, National Aboriginal Achievement Awards (Indspire Awards) for Performance.
- 1995: winner, Juno Awards for Best New Solo Artist and Best Music of Aboriginal Canada Recording, Arctic Rose
- 1996: nominee, Juno Awards for Best Female Vocalist, Best Album (This Child), Single of the Year ("O Siem"), Best Music of Aboriginal Canada Recording (This Child), Best Video ("O Siem")
- 2001: nominee, Juno Award for Best Music of Aboriginal Canada Recording, Unsung Heroes
- 2004: winner, Juno Award for Aboriginal Recording, Big Feeling
- 2004: appointed Officer of the Order of Canada
- 2007: nominee, Juno Award for Aboriginal Recording of the Year, Blood Red Earth
- 2008: appointed as Distinguished Scholar in Residence at the University of Alberta
- 2016: Governor General's Performing Arts Awards - Lifetime Artistic Achievement
- The book Aboriginal Carol (2007, Red Deer Press), by David Bouchard, illustrated by Moses Beaver, bilingual (English and Inuktitut), translation and music by Susan Aglukark, was awarded a White Raven by the International Youth Library

== Discography ==
=== Albums ===
Title	Album details	Peak chart positions		Certifications (sales threshold)
Title	Album details	CAN Country	CAN	Certifications (sales threshold)
Dreams for You	Release date: 1990; Label: Self-released	—	—	
Arctic Rose	Release date: 1992; Label: EMI Canada	—	—	
Christmas	Release date: December 1993; Label: EMI Canada	—	—	
This Child	Release date: 24 January 1995; Label: EMI Canada	1	25	MC: 3× Platinum
Unsung Heroes	Release date: 9 November 1999; Label: EMI Canada	—	—	
Big Feeling	Release date: 22 July 2003; Label: EMI Canada	—	—	
Blood Red Earth	Release date: 15 August 2006; Label: Arbor Records	—	—	
White Sahara	Release date: 4 October 2011; Label: EMI	—	—	
Dreaming of Home	Release date: 5 November 2013; Label: E1 Music	—	—	
The Crossing	Release date: 29 April 2022; Label: E1 Music	–	–	
"—" denotes releases that did not chart

=== Singles ===
Year	Title	Peak chart positions			Album
Year	Title	CAN Country	CAN AC	CAN	Album
1990	"Searching"	—	—	—	Dreams for You
1993	"Little Toy Trains"	—	—	—	Christmas
1994	"Song of the Land"	31	4	55	Arctic Rose
1994	"Still Running"	—	17	—	Arctic Rose
1995	"O Siem"	1	1	3	This Child
1995	"Hina Na Ho (Celebration)"	19	3	30	This Child
1995	"Breakin' Down"	—	10	32	This Child
1996	"Shamaya"	38	—	71	This Child
1996	"Suffer in Silence"	—	—	—	This Child
1999	"One Turn Deserves Another"	—	19	—	Unsung Heroes
2000	"Turn of the Century"	—	55	—	Unsung Heroes
2004	"Whaler's Lullaby"	—	—	—	Big Feeling
2006	"I Will Return"	—	—	—	Blood Red Earth
"—" denotes releases that did not chart

== Books ==
Aglukark is the author of a series of historically based picture books, published by Inhabit Media Inc, which draws on the experiences of her grandmother's childhood to examine the unique perspective of living in the Arctic at a time when traditional Inuit values began to mix with outside influences and objects. Each volume in the series examines the feelings of anticipation, excitement, loss, and resilience experienced by Inuit as their world began to change through the introduction of outside influences. Seen through the eyes of one little girl as she navigates life in her camp with her family, this series gives young readers a window into a unique time in Arctic history.

- Una Huna?: What Is This? (2018)
- Una Huna?: Ukpik Learns to Sew (2022)

== See also ==
- Music of Canada
- Aboriginal music of Canada
- Notable Aboriginal people of Canada
- List of Canadian musicians
