= That's What My Love Is For =

Single by Anne Murray

from the album Anne Murray
- Released: 1996
- Genre: Country
- Length: 3:48
- Label: Arista Records 0389
- Songwriter(s): Amy Sky, Dave Pickell

Anne Murray singles chronology
"What Would It Take" (1996)	"That's What My Love Is For" (1996)	"Me Too" (1996)

"That's What My Love Is For" is a song written by Amy Sky and Dave Pickell and performed by Anne Murray and Aaron Neville. The song reached No. 15 on the Canadian Adult Contemporary chart in 1996. The song appeared on her 1996 album, Anne Murray.

== Charts ==
Chart (1996)	Peak position
Canadian RPM Adult Contemporary	15
