= Insensitive (song) =

1994 single by Jann Arden

Single by Jann Arden

from the album Living Under June
- B-side: "I Just Don't Love You Anymore"
- Released: October 1994
- Studio: Groove Masters (Santa Monica, California)
- Length: 4:16
- Label: A&M
- Songwriter: Anne Loree
- Producer: Ed Cherney

Jann Arden singles chronology
"Could I Be Your Girl" (1994)	"Insensitive" (1994)	"Wonderdrug" (1995)

Music video
- "Insensitive" on YouTube

"Insensitive" is a song by Canadian singer-songwriter Jann Arden, released in October 1994 by A&M Records as the second single from her second studio album, Living Under June (1994). Written by Anne Loree and produced by Ed Cherney, the song became Arden's most successful single, reaching number one in Canada and Australia, and numbers 10 and 12 on the US Cash Box Top 100 and Billboard Hot 100 charts. "Insensitive" was later included on Arden's 2001 greatest hits album, Greatest Hurts, in both the original and live versions.

== Background ==
Anne Loree would recall writing "Insensitive" in response to an unhappy tryst with a chef at a Calgary restaurant where Loree was waiting tables. "I sat down at my electric piano in the basement of a rented house I shared with four roommates, broke and brokenhearted, full of pain and angst, and wrote 'Insensitive'. It took me probably less than half an hour and I walked away feeling much better for it and much hipper to Prince Charmings who aren't really into you." Jann Arden, then based in Calgary, optioned "Insensitive" for Living Under June after hearing Loree perform the song at a local club.

"Insensitive" remains Arden's most successful single. It reached number one in her native Canada for three weeks, number 12 on the US Billboard Hot 100, and number four on Billboard's Adult Contemporary chart. The song's US success was assisted by its presence in the film Bed of Roses; although Bed of Roses was not a major success, the video for "Insensitive" was aired on an episode of Entertainment Tonight, on which the film had been promoted. Its Italian success was occasioned by its use as a jingle in a TV ad campaign for department store Coin. On August 20, 1995, "Insensitive" reached number one on the Australian ARIA Singles Chart for one week, and it also charted at number 44 in New Zealand and at number 40 in the United Kingdom. At the Juno Awards of 1996, "Insensitive" was nominated for Single of the Year.

== Music video ==
For the track's US release a video was prepped comprising clips from the film Bed of Roses interspersed with footage of Jann singing the song; Jeth Weinrich directed. The video for "Insensitive" was nominated for Video of the Year at the 1995 Juno Awards.

== Track listings ==
- Canadian cassette single

A. "Insensitive" – 4:16
B. "I Just Don't Love You Anymore" – 3:54

- US CD single
1. "Insensitive" (LP version) – 4:16
2. "Gasoline" (live from KKOS) – 4:18
- US maxi-CD single
1. "Insensitive" (LP version) – 4:16
2. "Gasoline" (live from KKOS) – 4:18
3. "Still Here" – 3:47
4. "Cuts" – 2:59
- US cassette single
1. "Insensitive" (remix) – 4:12
2. "Gasoline" (live from KKOS) – 4:18
- UK CD single
1. "Insensitive"
2. "Frankie in the Rain"
3. "Living Under June"
4. "It Looks Like Rain"
- UK cassette single

A. "Insensitive"
B. "Frankie in the Rain"

- European and Australian CD single
1. "Insensitive" – 4:16
2. "I Would Die for You" – 4:36
3. "Gasoline" (live version) – 4:26

== Credits and personnel ==
Credits are taken from the US cassette single sleeve.

Studios

- Recorded at Groove Masters (Santa Monica, California)
- Mixed at Brooklyn Recording Studio (Los Angeles)

Personnel

- Anne Loree – writing
- Jann Arden – vocals, co-production, arrangement
- Ed Cherney – production, recording, mixing, arrangement
- Neil MacGonigill – executive production
- Duane Seykora – recording
- Jeffery "C.J." Vanston – arrangement
- Dillon O'Brian – background vocals arrangement

== Charts ==
=== Weekly charts ===
Chart (1994–1996)	Peak position
Australia (ARIA)	1
Canada Retail Singles (The Record)	9
Canada Top Singles (RPM)	1
Canada Adult Contemporary (RPM)	1
Europe (Eurochart Hot 100)	97
New Zealand (Recorded Music NZ)	44
Scottish Singles Sales (Official Charts)	50
UK Singles (Official Charts)	40
US Billboard Hot 100	12
US Adult Contemporary (Billboard)	4
US Adult Pop Airplay (Billboard)	6
US Pop Airplay (Billboard)	9
US Cash Box Top 100	10

=== Year-end charts ===
Chart (1994)	Position
Canada Top Singles (RPM)	77

Chart (1995)	Position
Australia (ARIA)	12
Canada Top Singles (RPM)	14
Canada Adult Contemporary (RPM)	15

Chart (1996)	Position
US Billboard Hot 100	22
US Adult Contemporary (Billboard)	12
US Adult Top 40 (Billboard)	7
US Top 40/Mainstream (Billboard)	22

== Certifications ==
Region	Certification	Certified units/sales
Australia (ARIA)	Platinum	70,000^{^}
^{^} Shipments figures based on certification alone.

== Release history ==
Region	Date	Format(s)	Label(s)	Ref.
Canada	October 1994	Cassette	A&M	
Europe	1994	Radio	A&M	
Australia	April 24, 1995	CD; cassette	A&M; Polydor	
United States	January 16, 1996	Contemporary hit radio	A&M	

== Cover versions ==
Country singer LeAnn Rimes also released her own version of "Insensitive" on her 1998 album, Sittin' on Top of the World.

Jasper Steverlinck remade "Insensitive" for his 2004 album, Songs of Innocence.

Kitchener-Waterloo, Ontario-based punk rock band The Decay also released a cover version on the Juicebox Recording Co. compilation, Our Favourite Songs.

== In popular culture ==
The popular podcast "How to Do Everything" created by the producers of the NPR news quiz Wait Wait... Don't Tell Me! featured the song in a series of podcasts. The song was introduced by a music expert when asked if there was a song she loved, but understood was terrible. This began a segment on the podcast titled "Best-Worst Song Competition" where listeners submitted songs they secretly enjoyed, but knew were generally considered to be poor songs. Each segment opened with a clip of "Insensitive" with the hosts saying "You know what that sound means – it's time for our Best-Worst Song Competition!"
