= A Murder in the Glee Club =

Studio album by Sandbox
- Released: November 1997
- Genre: Alternative rock
- Length: 50:13
- Label: EMI Music Canada
- Producer: Don Fleming

Sandbox chronology
Bionic (1995)	A Murder in the Glee Club (1997)

A Murder in the Glee Club is the second and final album released by the 1990s Halifax, Nova Scotia rock group Sandbox. It is a concept album revolving around the storyline of a murderer haunted by his actions. The final track of their previous album, "...and the Mood Changes" from Bionic, has a spoken word segment that is meant as a direct lead-in to this album.

== Track listing ==
1. "A Murder in the Glee Club" – 0:53
2. "...to Red" – 3:52
3. "Spin" – 4:15
4. "The Garden Song" – 3:53
5. "The Specter" – 4:08
6. "Melt" – 3:13
7. "If I Tell" – 4:56
8. "Self-contained" – 3:49
9. "Carry" – 3:06
10. "Missed the Day" – 3:28
11. "Bear Bear" – 4:11
12. "How I Feel" – 3:57
13. "A Question of Faith" – 6:32
