= Bionic (Sandbox album) =

Studio album by Sandbox
- Released: April 4, 1995
- Recorded: January – February 1995
- Genre: Alternative rock
- Length: 50:19
- Label: Latitude Records
- Producers: William O'Guru, Sandbox

Sandbox chronology
Maskman (1993)	Bionic (1995)	A Murder in the Glee Club (1997)

Bionic is the debut album of the 1990s Canadian rock band Sandbox. The album was recorded at Metalworks Studios between January and February 1995. It was released in 1995 on Latitude Records, a short-lived independent label from St. John's, Newfoundland and Labrador founded by local music promoter Frederick Brokenshire and run out of his Fred's Records music store. An enhanced edition was later released in 1996.

== Singles ==
The album's first single, "Curious", reached #34 on Canada's RPM Singles chart and #8 on Canada's Alternative chart. The song's video received regular airplay on MuchMusic. "Curious" was also nominated for "Favourite New Song" at the 1995 CASBY Awards. Videos were later released for the singles "Collide" and "Here and There".

== Track listing ==
- All songs written by Sandbox, except where noted.
1. "Intro" – 0:15
2. "Curious" – 3:56
3. "Collide" – 3:38
4. "For You" – 3:41
5. "Decisions" – 4:29
6. "Grief" – 4:21
7. "Three Balloons and a Trapdoor" – 3:24 (Nicole Frosst, Mike Smith)
8. "Here and There" – 3:20
9. "Live" – 4:13
10. "Flux" – 4:16
11. "Weatherman" – 2:47
12. "Lustre" – 3:19
13. "... And the Mood Changes" – 4:09

== Personnel ==
- Paul Murray – vocals, kazoo
- Scott MacFarlane – bass, bells, vocals
- Troy Shanks – drums, piano, vocals
- Mike Smith – guitar, vocals
- Jason Archibald – guitar, vocals
