= Lee Pui Ming =

Hong-Kong jazz pianist, vocalist & composer (born 1956)

- Born: 1956 (age 69–70); Hong Kong, China
- Genres: Jazz
- Occupations: Musician; composer
- Instruments: Piano; vocals
- Years active: 1990s–2000s
- Labels: Pochee; Dorian; Ambiances Magnétiques; Innova

Lee Pui Ming (Chinese: 李佩鳴; born 1956 in Hong Kong) is a Hong Kong–born American pianist, vocalist, and composer. Her work combines elements of contemporary classical music, jazz, and Chinese music. She is one of the most notable figures in the Asian American jazz movement.

== Life ==
Lee was born in 1956 and began to play the piano at the age of three.

In 1976, she came to the United States to pursue music studies, earning bachelor's, master's, and doctorate degrees. In 1985, she relocated to Toronto, Ontario, and became active in the music scene there in the early 1990s. She leads an ensemble that has toured Asia and Canada.

Her 1994 album, Nine-Fold Heart, was nominated for a Juno Award for Best Global Recording.

Lee has performed with Joëlle Léandre, Otomo Yoshihide, Chris Cutler, René Lussier, Jean Derome, and Pierre Tanguay, among others. She has also composed music for several films.

== Discography ==
- 1991: Ming (Pochee)
- 1994: Nine-Fold Heart (Pochee)
- 1994: Strange Beauty: New Music for Piano (Dorian)
- 1999: Taklamakan (Pochee)
- 2002: Who's Playing (Ambiances Magnétiques)
- 2011: She Comes to Shore (Innova)
