= Capital Sound =

Canadian Eurodance band

- The band's first album, Sussex Drive

Background information
- Origin: Ottawa, Ontario, Canada
- Genres: Eurodance
- Years active: 1990s
- Past members: Nathalie Page; Céline "Katt" Guindon; Martin "Baby/Bit Burn" Brunet; Morgan; Donna Pearson

Capital Sound was a Canadian Eurodance band from Ottawa, Ontario - the capital city of Canada and the genesis for their name.

The group's core members, all of whom were billed only by single names in the band, were vocalists Nathalie (Page) and Katt (Céline Guindon) and keyboardists Baby/Bit Burn (Martin Brunet) and Morgan. Paolo Iovannone, credited as "Rocko T. Bello", was also a frequent songwriting collaborator, and was billed as a featured artist on some of the band's singles, but was not an official band member.

Their debut album, Sussex Drive, was produced by Michel Picard and released in 1994. The band won the Juno Award for Best Dance Recording for the single "Higher Love (Club Mix)" at the Juno Awards of 1995. Another single, "In the Night (Club Mix)", was nominated alongside it in the same category. Additional awards included the Cheer DJ Pool award in the 1995 Top Canadian Dance/Club Artist category and Quebec's Record Pool's Best New Dance Group in 1994.

Nathalie left the band following Sussex Drive to pursue a solo career, and was replaced by Donna (Pearson) on the band's 1996 album And the Party Goes On.
