= Thordis Elva =

Icelandic writer and activist

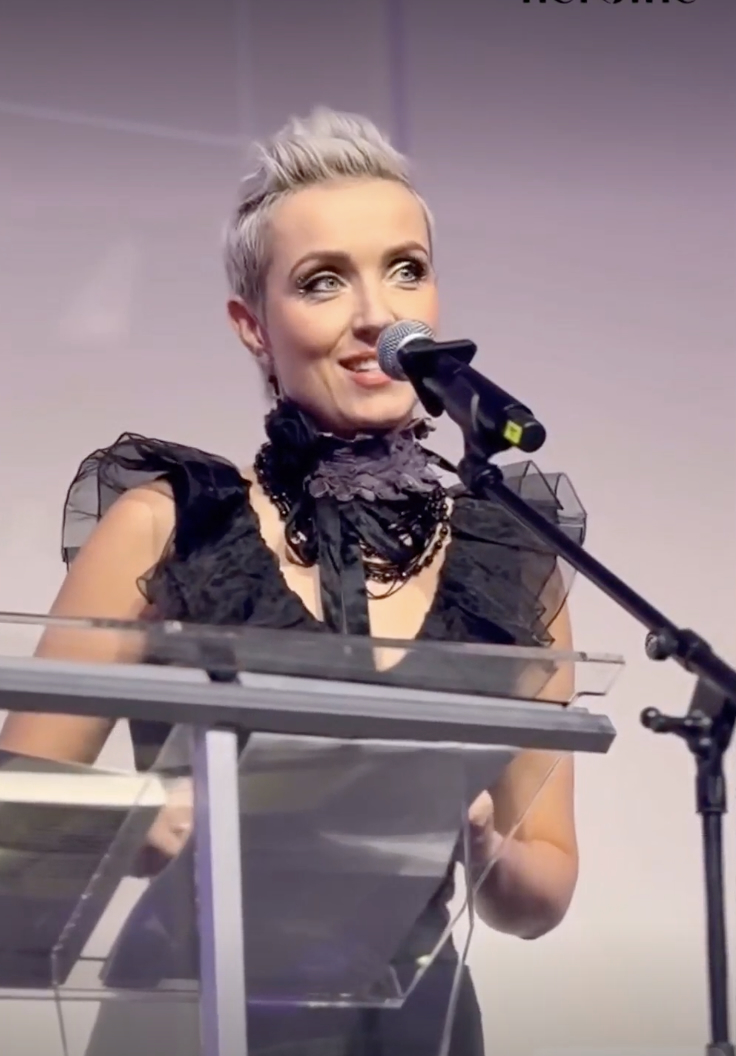
Thordis Elva at a book event in Prague, Czech Republic in November 2024.

Thordis Elva Thorvaldsdottir (Icelandic: Þórdís Elva Þorvaldsdóttir) is an Icelandic author, speaker, playwright and activist for digital rights and gender equality. In 2017, she gained world-wide recognition for her book South of Forgiveness that has since been published in fourteen countries, with the accompanying TED talk having been viewed over 10 million times. She was voted Woman of the Year 2015 by the Federation of Icelandic Women's Societies in Reykjavík. In 2017, Thordis Elva became one of the frontrunners of the #MeToo movement in Iceland, accepting the Person of the Year Award 2017 on behalf of the movement. She specializes in violence prevention and has shaped national and international policy on digital rights and gender equality.

== Literary works ==
Thordis' most well known book, South of Forgiveness (2017), is a memoir about her sexual assault and subsequent journey to healing and freedom in which Thordis collaborated with her perpetrator, making her the first rape survivor in the world to publicly do so. In 1996, Tom Stranger, aged 18, was offered to do a year-long student exchange program in Iceland where he met 16-year-old Thordis Elva at a theater club in the school they both attended. They began dating and had been in a relationship for over a month prior to the sexual assault taking place. Stranger took Thordis Elva home on the night of a school Christmas dance where she had become intoxicated by alcohol. Stranger then raped her in her home. He ended their relationship two days after the assault and returned to Australia when his exchange program was completed. Thordis Elva didn't press charges, explaining that she was "a 16-year-old kid with a head full of misconceptions ... I didn’t put two and two together and realize what I had been through was actually rape," on the Australian talk show Q&A in 2017.

Nine years after the assault, Thordis Elva, suffering from emotional trauma from the event, confronted Stranger in an email and he responded with a forthright confession. After eight years of communicating via email, they arranged to meet in Cape Town, South Africa for a period of one week to "face their past, once and for all", discussing the impact of Tom's violent actions on both of their lives, for him to take full responsibility for it and for both of them to heal. In the months after returning home, they co-authored South of Forgiveness. Their aim was to contribute their story to the global dialogue about sexual violence, perpetrator responsibility and the importance of consent.

Thordis is also the author of Á mannamáli (The Plain Truth), a book about gender-based violence in Iceland and its status within the criminal justice system, the public discourse and the political landscape. Á mannamáli was one of the most critically acclaimed books published in Iceland in 2009, receiving a nomination to the Icelandic Literature Prize amongst other awards.

As a playwright, nine of Thordis Elva's plays have been professionally staged. She was nominated to the Icelandic Theatre Prize as Playwright of the Year for her play Hunger.

== Public speaking and violence prevention work ==
In 2010, when serving as the Chair of the Board of the Women's Shelter of Iceland, Thordis Elva became aware of how digital violence was "locking victims inside destructive relationships" while "cementing and amplifying" other forms of intimate partner abuse. In 2020, after years of raising awareness about technologically-facilitated violence, she founded the Nordic Digital Rights and Equality Foundation along with other Nordic experts in the field. She has delivered keynotes at events hosted by the UN, the Nordic Council of Ministers, the Council of Europe, the European Union, and the Nordic Council discussing how digital rights, gender equality, and democracy intersect and she has contributed to anthologies about violence prevention and the harms of online abuse. She has shaped policy and written recommendations for Icelandic and Slovenian authorities on how to strengthen democracy and equality by countering technologically-facilitated violence in digital spaces.

In 2017, Thordis Elva toured with her co-author Tom Stranger and spoke publicly about their experiences, addressing audiences on TED talks, BBC Newsnight, at the Sydney Opera House and London's Royal Festival Hall at the Southbank Centre, to name a few.

== Short films ==
On commission by the Icelandic government, Thordis Elva wrote the educational short films "Get Consent" and "Stand By Yourself", both of which were aired on national television and in classrooms across the country. Get Consent won first prize at the INSAFE conference in 2013 and has been screened in the UN and European Commission. Stand By Yourself was nominated to the 2015 Edda Awards. In 2018, the short film "Take My Picture" was released online, after receiving one of the largest grants from the Icelandic Equality Fund. All three films stress the importance of consent in all intimate exchanges, both online and offline, and share the common themes of self-respect, bodily integrity and equality.

== Personal life ==
In 2018, in week 17 of her twin pregnancy, Thordis Elva suffered PPROM resulting in the rupturing of one of the twins' amniotic sacs. Doctors gave her a less than 1 percent chance of the twins' survival. Despite threats to her own health, she dismissed recommendations to abort the pregnancy and remained confined to her bed for the following three months, maintaining a daily presence on social media where she reported on her condition. She has referred to this as a very "dark period" of her life, but supportive friends and strangers broke the isolation of her bed rest and lit up her days, which she started referring to as her Army of Light. Born in week 28, the twins are healthy despite their prematurity. Thordis Elva has paid tribute to her Army of Light in various interviews, saying that the unconditional support she received helped her stay strong when all hope seemed lost.

In 2023, after a 15-year relationship that resulted in three children, news of Thordis Elva's divorce was made public. In July 2025, her relationship with Canadian musician Jann Arden was widely reported and confirmed by both parties on social media. Their engagement was announced on December 31, 2025. They were married August 15, 2026.

Thordis Elva identifies as pansexual and has been a vocal ally of the LGBTQIA movement, including trans youth.

== See also ==
- A Better Man (film), a film on intimate partner violence and responsibility
- Acquaintance rape
- Against Our Will, a book about rape of women by men
- Date rape
- Effects and aftermath of rape
