= Greatest Hurts: The Best of Jann Arden =

Greatest hits album by Jann Arden
- Released: 2001
- Recorded: 1993–2001
- Genre: Adult Alternative
- Length: 73:26
- Label: Universal Music Canada
- Producer: various

Jann Arden chronology
Blood Red Cherry (2000)	Greatest Hurts: The Best of Jann Arden (2001)	Jann Arden Live with the Vancouver Symphony Orchestra (2002)

Greatest Hurts: The Best of Jann Arden is a 2001 greatest hits album by Jann Arden.

In addition to Arden's best-known hits, the album also includes two new songs ("Thing For You" and "Never Mind"), two songs that Arden recorded for compilation albums ("You Don't Know Me", from the soundtrack to My Best Friend's Wedding, and "If It Be Your Will", from the Leonard Cohen tribute Tower of Song: The Songs of Leonard Cohen), an alternate version of "Sleepless" and a live version of Arden's most famous song, "Insensitive".

== Track listing ==
All songs written by Jann Arden, except where noted.

1. "Thing for You" – 4:40 - Arden/Russell Broom
2. "Could I Be Your Girl" – 4:50
3. "The Sound Of" – 3:34
4. "I Would Die for You" – 4:37
5. "Saved" – 4:36 - Arden/CJ Vanston
6. "If It Be Your Will" – 5:29 - Leonard Cohen
7. "Insensitive" – 4:16 - Anne Loree
8. "Sleepless" – 4:39 - Arden/Broom
9. "Will You Remember Me" – 3:37
10. "Sorry for Myself" – 3:57 - Arden/Broom
11. "You Don't Know Me" – 3:28 - Eddy Arnold/Cindy Walker
12. "Unloved" – 4:16
13. "Good Mother" – 4:58 - Arden/Robert Foster
14. "Never Mind" – 3:42
15. "Sleepless (Remix)" – 4:34 - Arden/Broom
16. "Insensitive (Live)" – 8:13 - Loree

== Year-end charts ==
Year-end chart performance for Greatest Hurts: The Best of Jann Arden
Chart (2001)	Position
Canadian Albums (Nielsen SoundScan)	113

Chart (2002)	Position
Canadian Albums (Nielsen SoundScan)	113
