= Time for Mercy =

Studio album by Jann Arden
- Released: 1993
- Recorded: 1992
- Studio: Groove Masters (Santa Monica, California); Brooklyn (Los Angeles, California); Conway (Hollywood, California)
- Length: 50:42
- Label: A&M
- Producer: Ed Cherney

Jann Arden chronology
Time for Mercy (1993)	Living Under June (1994)

Time for Mercy is the debut album by Canadian singer-songwriter Jann Arden, released in 1993. The album’s second single was "I Would Die for You", which received national radio and video airplay. Its video, directed by Jeth Weinrich, won the Juno Award for Video of the Year at the 1994 Juno Awards.

== Critical reception ==
Professional ratings
Review scores
Source	Rating
AllMusic	3/5 stars

The Province wrote: "Sympathetically produced by Ed Cherney, who provides atmospheric, inobtrusive modern folk-rock backdrops to Arden's unerringly emotive vocals, Time for Mercy introduces one of the most compelling, powerful voices in the country."

== Track listing ==
All tracks composed by Jann Arden; except where indicated

1. "I Would Die for You" – 4:36
2. "Waiting for Someone" (Arden, Russell Broom) – 4:40
3. "Will You Remember Me" – 3:46
4. "We Do Some Strange Things" – 5:31
5. "I'm Not Your Lover" – 4:13
6. "Give Me Back My Heart" – 5:02
7. "The Way Things Are Going" – 4:10
8. "Kitchen Window" – 5:06
9. "I Just Don't Love You Anymore" – 3:53
10. "Time for Mercy" – 4:15
11. "Over You" – 5:31

== Personnel ==
- Jann Arden – vocals, acoustic guitar
- C.J. Vanston – acoustic piano (1, 2, 4–6), synthesizers (1, 2, 6, 8, 9, 11), Hammond B3 organ (1, 3, 11), percussion (2), electric piano (3, 9), horn solo (6), synth pedal steel (7), keyboards (8)
- Mark J. Goodman – acoustic piano (7)
- Dave Resnik – electric guitar (1, 4–9), Leslie electric guitar (1, 2), tremolo guitar (2), acoustic guitar (5), baritone guitar (8)
- Bob Foster – strat guitar (3), backing vocals (3), tele guitar (5), electric guitar (7)
- Johnny Lee Schell – electric guitar (7), harmony vocals (7)
- Kenny Lyon – bass (1–9, 11)
- Jim Keltner – drums (1–9, 11)
- Lenny Castro – percussion (1–8), sandbag (5)
- Iki Levy – percussion (11)
- Mickey Raphael – harmonica (4)
- Ed Cherney – backing vocals (2)
- Moose Arlidge – harmony vocals (11)

Strings on "Time for Mercy"

- David Campbell – string arrangements and conductor
- Dominic Genova – bass
- Kevan Torfeh – cello
- Tom Tally – viola
- Sid Page – first violin

Production

- Neil MacGonigill – executive producer, management
- Ed Cherney – producer, recording, mixing
- Duane Seykora – recording
- Paul Dieter – recording assistant
- Bob Salcedo – recording assistant
- Scott Stillman – recording assistant
- Brett Swain – mix assistant
- Ron Lewter – mastering
- Doug Sax – mastering
- The Mastering Lab (Hollywood, California) – mastering location
- Edd Kolakowski – special production assistance, piano technician, guitar technician
- Rowan Moore – art direction, design
- Michael Tighe – photography
- Jeth Weinrich – photography
- Mitzi Spallas – make-up
- Susan Leary – typography
