= Sandbox (band) =

Canadian alternative rock band

- Origin: New Glasgow, Nova Scotia, Canada
- Genres: Alternative rock
- Years active: 1993–1998
- Label: Nettwerk
- Past members: Mike Smith; Paul Murray; Jason Archibald; Scott MacFarlane; Troy Shanks

Sandbox was a Canadian alternative rock band active in the 1990s. The band consisted of Paul Murray on lead vocals, Mike Smith and Jason Archibald on guitar, Scott MacFarlane on bass and Troy Shanks on drums.

== Formation ==
Sandbox was formed by Mike Smith in New Glasgow in 1992, originally as a cover band named Sandbox Legacy. Lead singer Paul Murray is the nephew of singer Anne Murray.

The band debuted with the 1993 indie EP, Maskman.

== Canadian chart success ==
Their debut album Bionic was released in 1995. The album spawned their most well known singles, "Curious" and "Collide". "Curious" reached No. 34 on Canada's RPM Singles chart and No. 8 on Canada's Alternative chart, while "Collide" peaked at #57 in the RPM100. Both songs received regular airplay on MuchMusic.

They were nominated for Best New Group at the Juno Awards of 1996.

Their second album, A Murder in the Glee Club was released in 1997. Produced by Don Fleming, the album was a concept album about the aftermath of a murder. The single "Carry" peaked at #38 in the RPM100 the week of January 19, 1998. However, the band was at this time facing difficulties with their record label, who wanted them to pursue a more commercial alternative rock sound instead of their Haligonian power pop style, and they were dropped from the label after the album's release.

== Breakup ==
Following the dissolution of the band, Smith went on to play Bubbles in the Canadian cult hit television series Trailer Park Boys. Bassist Scott MacFarlane played for Crush and Gordie Sampson. Jason Archibald graduated from Dalhousie University in 2001 with a degree in medicine.

== Discography ==
=== Studio albums ===
- 1995 - Bionic
- 1997 - A Murder in the Glee Club

=== Extended plays ===
- 1993 - Maskman

=== Singles ===
Title	Year	Peak chart positions		Album
Title	Year	CAN	CAN Rock	Album
"Curious"	1995	34	8	Bionic
"Collide"	1995	57	—	Bionic
"Here and There"	1996	—	—	Bionic
"Carry"	1997	38	—	A Murder in the Glee Club
