= Free (Jann Arden album) =

Studio album by Jann Arden
- Released: September 29, 2009
- Recorded: 2009
- Genre: Adult alternative
- Length: 50:42
- Label: Universal Music Canada

Jann Arden chronology
Uncover Me (2007)	Free (2009)	Uncover Me 2 (2011)

Free is the eighth studio album by Canadian singer-songwriter Jann Arden, released in 2009 featuring the single "A Million Miles Away". The album debuted at #9 on the Canadian Albums Chart. The album includes Arden's version of the Michael Bublé single "Lost", which is co-written by Arden. American country music group SHeDAISY perform background vocals.

== Track listing ==
1. "Free" (Jann Arden, Kristyn Osborn, Connie Harrington)
2. "Daughter Down" (Arden, Osborn, Harrington)
3. "The Devil Won" (Arden)
4. "Yeah You" (Arden, Osborn)
5. "Away" (Arden)
6. "Until This" (Arden, Osborn)
7. "You Are Everything" (Arden)
8. "Everybody's Broken" (Arden, Osborn)
9. "A Million Miles Away" (Arden, Russell Broom)
10. "All the Days" (Arden)
11. "Lost" (Michael Bublé, Arden, Alan Chang, Amy Foster-Gilles, Philip Noone)

== Personnel ==
- Adapted from AllMusic:
- Chris Graffagnino - guitar
- Kristyn Kassidy - backing vocals
- Bruce Leitl - bass, keyboards, percussion
- Kelsi Osborn - backing vocals
- SHeDAISY - backing vocals
- Jonathan Yudkin - banjo, cello, Celtic harp, resonator guitar, mandocello, mandola, mandolin, orchestra bells, double bass, triangle, viola, violectra, violin
- Jann Arden - vocals

== Charts ==
Chart (2009)	Peak position
Canadian Albums (Billboard)	9

== Certifications ==
Region	Certification
Canada (Music Canada)	Gold
