= Love Is the Only Soldier =

Studio album by Jann Arden
- Released: September 9, 2003
- Recorded: 2003
- Length: 39:23
- Label: Universal Music Canada
- Producer: Jann Arden, Russell Broom

Jann Arden chronology
Jann Arden Live with the Vancouver Symphony Orchestra (2002)	Love Is the Only Soldier (2003)	Jann Arden (2005)

Love Is the Only Soldier is the fifth studio album by Canadian singer-songwriter Jann Arden, released on September 9, 2003.

== Track listing ==
1. "If You Loved Me" (Arden) – 3:51
2. "Not Saying Goodbye" (Arden, Broom) – 4:34
3. "Love Is the Only Soldier" (Arden, Broom) – 3:53
4. "Anna Rebecca" (Arden) – 5:00
5. "Four Feet Deep" (Arden, Gryner) – 3:47
6. "Only One" (Arden, Broom) – 4:08
7. "When You Left Me" (Arden) – 3:54
8. "Ruby Red" (Arden) – 3:25
9. "The Right Road Home" (Arden, Bentley) – 3:36
10. "Fighting for the World" (Arden) – 3:15

== Personnel ==
- Jann Arden – piano, vocals
- Russell Broom – guitar, keyboards, omnichord
- Tanya Kalmanovitch – violin, viola
- Michael Lent – bass guitar
- Repete – background vocals

== Production ==
- Producers: Jann Arden, Russell Broom
- Engineer: Russell Broom
- Assistant engineer: Misha Rajaratnam
- Mixing: Russell Broom
- Mastering: Doug Saks

== Charts ==
Album – Billboard (North America)

Year	Chart	Position
2003	Top Canadian Albums	7
