= O Siem =

1995 single by Susan Aglukark

Single by Susan Aglukark

from the album This Child
- Released: 1995
- Genre: Country, world music
- Length: 4:25
- Label: EMI Music Canada
- Songwriters: Susan Aglukark; Chad Irschick
- Producer: Chad Irschick

Susan Aglukark singles chronology
"Still Running" (1994)	"O Siem" (1995)	"Hina Na Ho (Celebration)" (1995)

"O Siem" is a song written by Inuit musician Susan Aglukark and Chad Irschick. It was recorded by Aglukark on her 1995 album This Child, and was released that year as the album's first single. The song went to number one on both the Canadian RPM country and adult contemporary charts that year, and peaked at number three on the pop charts.

== Content ==
Alternating between English and Halkomelem, the song was the first top-10 hit in Canada for an Inuk performer. Lyrically, it is a call to welcome everyone, regardless of race, gender, or sexuality. The title means "joyful greeting".

== Musicians ==
- Susan Aglukark: vocals
- Michael Francis: guitars
- Tom Szczesniak: bass
- Claude Desjardins: drums, percussion
- Ray Parker: organ
- Chad Irschick: synth, percussion
- David Blamires: background vocals
- Debbie Fleming: background vocals

== Chart performance ==
The song debuted at number 85 on the Canadian RPM Country Tracks on the chart dated January 16, 1995 and spent 12 weeks on the chart before peaking at number one on April 3.

=== Weekly charts ===
Chart (1995)	Peak position
Canada Top Singles (RPM)	3
Canada Adult Contemporary (RPM)	1
Canada Country Singles (RPM)	1

=== Year-end charts ===
Chart (1995)	Position
Canada Top Singles (RPM)	34
Canada Adult Contemporary (RPM)	20
Canada Country Tracks (RPM)	26

== In Media ==
"O Siem" was featured heavily in Season 7 of the popular Crave and Hulu TV series Letterkenny.
