= Juno Awards of 1995 =

Canadian music awards ceremony

- Date: 26 March 1995
- Venue: Copps Coliseum, Hamilton, Ontario
- Hosted by: Multiple (see article)

Television/radio coverage
- Network: CBC

The Juno Awards of 1995 was an awards show representing Canadian music industry achievements of the previous year. It took place on 26 March 1995 in Hamilton, Ontario at a ceremony in the Copps Coliseum. Mary Walsh, Rick Mercer and other regulars of the television series This Hour Has 22 Minutes were the hosts for the ceremonies, which were broadcast on CBC Television. Almost 10,000 people were in attendance, and over 6,500 public tickets were sold. It was the first time the Awards event was open to the public.

Nominees were announced on 1 February 1995. Susan Aglukark and Jann Arden were among the prominent nominees this year. Vancouver rock band 54-40's album Smilin' Buddha Cabaret was accidentally left off the nomination list for Best Alternative Album; after realizing the error, the Academy decided to add them to the category, and rather than remove another band's album simply widened the category to six nominees.

Leonard Rambeau, the long-time manager of Anne Murray, received a special lifetime achievement award; Rambeau died later that year of cancer.

== Nominees and winners ==
=== Entertainer of the Year ===
This award was chosen by a national poll rather than by Juno organisers CARAS.

Winner: The Tragically Hip

Other Nominees:

- Celine Dion
- Crash Test Dummies
- Sarah McLachlan
- Neil Young

=== Female Vocalist of the Year ===
Winner: Jann Arden

Other Nominees:

- Sass Jordan
- Julie Masse
- Loreena McKennitt
- Michelle Wright

=== Male Vocalist of the Year ===
Winner: Neil Young

Other Nominees:

- Bruce Cockburn
- Colin James
- John McDermott
- Roch Voisine

=== Best New Solo Artist ===
Winner: Susan Aglukark

Other Nominees:

- Sara Craig
- David Gogo
- Éric Lapointe
- Andrew Matheson

=== Group of the Year ===
Winner: The Tragically Hip

Other Nominees:

- Barenaked Ladies
- Crash Test Dummies
- Spirit of the West
- The Watchmen

=== Best New Group ===
Winner: Moist

Other Nominees:

- Big Sugar
- Farmer's Daughter
- The Gandharvas
- Wild Strawberries

=== Songwriter of the Year ===
Winner: Jann Arden

Other Nominees:

- Bryan Adams
- Greg Keelor and Jim Cuddy
- Joni Mitchell
- Neil Young

=== Country Female Vocalist of the Year ===
Winner: Michelle Wright

Other Nominees:

- Lisa Brokop
- Cindy Church
- Patricia Conroy
- Anne Murray

=== Country Male Vocalist of the Year ===
Winner: Charlie Major

Other Nominees:

- Joel Feeney
- George Fox
- Terry Kelly
- Jim Witter

=== Country Group or Duo of the Year ===
Winner: Prairie Oyster

Other Nominees:

- Coda the West
- Farmer's Daughter
- Prescott-Brown
- Quartette

=== Instrumental Artist of the Year ===
Winner: André Gagnon

Other Nominees:

- Hennie Bekker
- Wayne Chaulk
- Marie-Andree Ostiguy
- Quartetto Gelato

=== Producer of the Year ===
Winner: Robbie Robertson, "Skin Walker" and "It Is a Good Day to Die" by Robbie Robertson

Other Nominees:

- Arnold Lanni, "Birdman" and "Naveed" by Our Lady Peace
- David Foster, "Power of My Love" and "Colour of My Love" by Celine Dion, "I Swear" and "All-4-One" by All-4-One
- Mark Howard and The Tragically Hip, "Grace, Too", "Day for Night", "Nautical Disaster" by The Tragically Hip
- Pierre Marchand, "Possession", "Stumbling Towards Ecstasy", "Good Enough" by Sarah McLachlan

=== Recording Engineer of the Year ===
Winner: Lenny DeRose, "Lay My Body Down" and "Charms" by The Philosopher Kings

Other nominees:

- Mike Fraser, "Push Comes to Shove" by Jackyl and "Deuces Are Wild" by Aerosmith
- Michael Phillip Wojewoda, Music from the Motion Picture Whale Music by Rheostatics
- Marc Ramaer, "Hush Sweet Lover" by k.d. lang and "Jane" by Barenaked Ladies
- Jeff Wolpert, "The Bonny Swans" and "The Dark Night of the Soul" by Loreena McKennitt

=== Global Achievement Award ===
Winner: Leonard Rambeau

=== Canadian Music Hall of Fame ===
Winner: Buffy Sainte-Marie

The induction was rescinded in 2025, over her American citizenship.

=== Walt Grealis Special Achievement Award ===
Winner: Louis Applebaum

== Nominated and winning albums ==
=== Album of the Year ===
Winner: The Colour of My Love, Celine Dion

Other Nominees:

- Day for Night, The Tragically Hip
- Five Days in July, Blue Rodeo
- Fumbling Towards Ecstasy, Sarah McLachlan
- North Country, The Rankin Family

=== Best Children's Album ===
Winner: Bananaphone, Raffi

Other Nominees:

- Eric's World Record, Eric Nagler
- J'ai tant danse, Carmen Campagne
- Jacob Two Two and the Dinosaur, Mordecai Richler
- What a day!, Fred Penner

=== Best Classical Album (Solo or Chamber Ensemble) ===
Winner: Erica Goodman Plays Canadian Harp Music, Erica Goodman

Other Nominees:

- Bibor: Instrumental Works, Tafelmusik, musical director Jeanne Lamon
- Gabrielli for Brass, The Canadian Brass
- The Joy of Piano, Valerie Tryon
- Quartetto Gelato, Quartetto Gelato

=== Best Classical Album (Large Ensemble) ===
Winner: Bach: Brandenburg Concertos Nos. 1-6, Tafelmusik, director Jeanne Lamon

Other Nominees:

- Ibert: Escales, Flute Concerto, flute Timothy Hutchins, Montreal Symphony Orchestra, conductor Charles Dutoit
- Shostakovich: Symphonies 1 and 15, Montreal Symphony Orchestra, conductor Charles Dutoit
- Stravinsky: Apollon Musagete, Sinfonietta de Montréal, conductor Charles Dutoit
- The Romantic Piano Concerto Vol. 7 - Henselt and Alkan, piano Marc-André Hamelin, BBC Scottish Symphony Orchestra, conductor Martyn Brabbins

=== Best Classical Album (Vocal or Choral Performance) ===
Winner: Berlioz: Les Troyens, Vocal Soloists, Choeur et Orchestre symphonique de Montréal, conductor Charles Dutoit

Other Nominees:

- Glitter and Be Gay, Tracy Dahl, Calgary Philharmonic Orchestra, conductor Mario Bernardi
- Janáček: Glagolitic Mass and Sinfonietta, Choeur et Orchestre symphonique de Montréal, conductor Charles Dutoit
- Pergolesi and Vivaldi: Stabat Mater, vocal soloists Catherine Robbin and Dorothea Röschmann, Les Violons du Roy, director Bernard Labadie
- Schubert: Schwanengesang D.957, baritone Kevin McMillan, piano Lev Natochenny

=== Best Album Design ===
Winner: Andrew MacNaughtan and Our Lady Peace, Naveed

Other Nominees:

- Nancy Boyle, Itch by Kim Mitchell
- Kevin Lynn, Project Twinkle by King Cobb Steelie
- Antoine Moonen and Mike Trebilcock, Starry by The Killjoys
- Megan Oldfield, Smilin' Buddha Cabaret by 54-40

=== Best Selling Album (Foreign or Domestic) ===
Winner: The Colour of My Love, Celine Dion

Other Nominees:

- August and Everything After, Counting Crows
- Day For Night, The Tragically Hip
- The Sign, Ace of Base
- Vs., Pearl Jam

=== Best Mainstream Jazz Album ===
Winner: Free Trade, Free Trade

Other Nominees:

- Bill, Please, Lorne Lofsky
- I Thought About You..., Ranee Lee
- Overtime, Rob McConnell and The Boss Brass
- The Water Is Wide, Jane Bunnett

=== Best Contemporary Jazz Album ===
Winner: The Merlin Factor, Jim Hillman and The Merlin Factor

Other Nominees:

- Carpathian Blues, John Stetch
- Dual Vision, Joe Sealy and Paul Novotny
- Hymn to the Earth, Sonny Greenwich
- We Were Talking, Mark Duggan

=== Best Roots & Traditional Album ===
Winner: The Mask and Mirror, Loreena McKennitt

Other Nominees:

- The Assassin's Apprentice, Stephen Fearing
- Driver, Ferron
- La Mistrine, La Bottine Souriante
- Turbulent Indigo, Joni Mitchell

=== Best Alternative Album ===
Winner: Shiver, Rose Chronicles

Other Nominees:

- Forever Again, Eric's Trip
- Naveed, Our Lady Peace
- Project Twinkle, King Cobb Steelie
- Smilin' Buddha Cabaret, 54-40
- Twice Removed, Sloan

=== Best Blues/Gospel Album ===
Winner: Joy To The World - Jubilation V, Montreal Jubilation Gospel Choir

Other Nominees:

- Good Times Guaranteed, Downchild Blues Band
- Home Is Where the Harp Is Live, Harpdog Brown and The Bloodhounds
- Just Gettin' Started, Rita Chiarelli
- Welcome Back, John Ellison

=== Best Selling Francophone Album ===
Winner: Coup de tête, Roch Voisine

Other Nominees:

- Déchaînée, France D'Amour
- Jehanne Blouin chante Noël, Jehanne Blouin
- Obsession, Éric Lapointe
- Y, Lynda Lemay

=== Best Hard Rock Album ===
Winner: Suffersystem, Monster Voodoo Machine

Other Nominees:

- Get Down, Malhavoc
- Millennium, Front Line Assembly
- Prototype, Varga
- Purge, Econoline Crush

== Nominated and winning releases ==
=== Single of the Year ===
Winner: "Could I Be Your Girl", Jann Arden

Other Nominees:

- "Mmm Mmm Mmm Mmm", Crash Test Dummies
- "The Power of Love", Celine Dion
- "Please Forgive Me", Bryan Adams
- "Push", Moist

=== Best Classical Composition ===
Winner: "Sketches From Natal", Malcolm Forsyth with CBC Vancouver Orchestra

Other Nominees:

- "From the Eastern Gate", Alexina Louie, Erica Goodman Plays Canadian Harp Music
- "Iridescence", Chris Harman, Iridescence by Espirit Orchestra
- "Missa Brevis No. 11 Sancti Johannis Baptistae", Healey Willan - Healey Willan Masses & Motets by The Choirs of St. Mary Magdalene Church
- "Sonata Rhapsody for Viola & Piano", Jean Coulthard - A Portrait of the Viola by Steven Dann and Bruce Vogt

=== Best Rap Recording ===
Winner: Certified, Ghetto Concept

Other Nominees:

- Chi-Litchi-Latchi-Low, Freaks of Reality
- Naaah, Dis Kid Can't Be from Canada?!!, Maestro Fresh-Wes
- Really Livin', Rascalz
- Subliminal Simulation, Dream Warriors

=== Best R&B/Soul Recording ===
Winner: "First Impression For The Bottom Jigglers", Bass Is Base

Other Nominees:

- "I Had a Dream", Carol Medina
- "Key to My Heart", The Earthtones
- "Love T.K.O.", The Nylons
- "Smooth & Soft", Gentlemen X

=== Best Music of Aboriginal Canada Recording ===
Winner: Arctic Rose, Susan Aglukark

Other Nominees:

- Akua Tuta, Kashtin
- Blue Voice/New Voice, Jani Lauzon
- Music for the Native Americans, Robbie Robertson and The Red Road Ensemble
- No Regrets, Tom Jackson

=== Best Reggae Recording ===
Winner: "Class and Credential", Carla Marshall

Other Nominees:

- "A Love Thang", Tanya Mullings
- "Lazah Current", Lazah Current
- "Smokin' the Goats", One
- "The Sound", Fujahtive

=== Best Global Recording ===
Winner: Africa +, Eval Manigat

Other Nominees:

- Dancing on the Moon Contigo, Oscar Lopez
- Indiscretion, Djole
- Nene, Alpha Yaya Diallo
- Nine-Fold Heart, The Lee Pui Ming Ensemble

=== Best Dance Recording ===
Winner: Higher Love (Club Mix), Capital Sound

Other Nominees:

- "Could I Be Your Girl", Jann Arden
- "In the Night", Capital Sound
- "Music Is My Life", Temperance
- "Pure (You're Touching Me)", West End Girls

=== Best Video ===
Winner: Lyne Charlebois, "Tunnel of Trees" by Gogh Van Go

Other Nominees:

- Curtis Wehrfritz, "Bad Timing" by Blue Rodeo
- Jeth Weinrich, "Blame Your Parents" by 54-40
- Jeth Weinrich, "Insensitive" by Jann Arden
- Brenton Spencer, "Push" by Moist
