= Could I Be Your Girl =

1994 single by Jann Arden

- Australian CD single artwork, also used for the US cassette single

Single by Jann Arden

from the album Living Under June
- Released: 1994
- Length: 4:48
- Label: A&M
- Songwriter: Jann Arden
- Producers: Jann Arden, Ed Cherney

Jann Arden singles chronology
| "Time for Mercy" (1993) | "Could I Be Your Girl" (1994) | "Insensitive" (1994) |

"Could I Be Your Girl" is a song by Canadian singer-songwriter Jann Arden. It was released in 1994 as the lead single from her second album, Living Under June (1994). The song reached number three in Canada and topped the country's RPM Adult Contemporary chart for one week. In the United States, it was Arden's first single to chart, reaching number 33 on the Billboard Adult Contemporary chart. The song won the 1995 Juno Award for Single of the Year.

Unusually for songs by Jann Arden, "Could I Be Your Girl" also had a dance remix version which circulated on Canadian pop radio shortly after the release of the original version. This song was included on Arden's 2001 greatest hits album, Greatest Hurts.

== Charts ==
=== Weekly charts ===
| Chart (1994) | Peak position |
|---|---|
| Canada Top Singles (RPM) | 3 |
| Canada Adult Contemporary (RPM) | 1 |
| US Adult Contemporary (Billboard) | 33 |

=== Year-end charts ===
| Chart (1994) | Position |
|---|---|
| Canada Top Singles (RPM) | 21 |
| Canada Adult Contemporary (RPM) | 18 |

== Release history ==
| Region | Date | Format(s) | Label(s) | Ref. |
|---|---|---|---|---|
| Canada | 1994 | CD | A&M | |
| Japan | April 26, 1995 | Mini-CD | A&M | |
| United States | May 16, 1995 | Contemporary hit radio | A&M | |
| Australia | October 2, 1995 | CD; cassette | A&M; Polydor | |
