= Happy? (Jann Arden album) =

Studio album by Jann Arden
- Released: September 23, 1997 (Canada); June 8, 1998 (U.S.)
- Recorded: 1997
- Studio: Groove Masters (Santa Monica, California)
- Genre: Adult alternative
- Length: 45:30
- Label: A&M
- Producer: Jann Arden, Ed Cherney, Mark Goldenberg

Jann Arden chronology
Living Under June (1994)	Happy? (1997)	Blood Red Cherry (2000)

Professional ratings
Review scores
Source	Rating
Allmusic	3.5/5 stars

Happy? is the third album by Canadian singer-songwriter Jann Arden, released on September 23, 1997, in Canada and June 8, 1998, in the United States.

== Track listing ==
All songs written by Jann Arden, except where noted.

1. "The Sound Of" – 3:33
2. "Leave Me Now" – 3:50
3. "I Know You" – 4:16
4. "Holy Moses" – 4:54
5. "Wishing That" – 4:12
6. "Saved" (Arden, C. J. Vanston) – 4:36
7. "Ode to a Friend" – 2:56
8. "Shooting Horses" (Arden, Vanston, Russell Broom) – 4:15
9. "Weeds" – 3:56
10. "Hangin' by a Thread" (Arden, Robert Foster) – 5:05
11. "To Sir With Love" (Don Black, Mark London) (Hidden track on Canadian release) – 3:57

== Personnel ==
- Jann Arden – vocals, background vocals, harmony vocals
- Kenny Aronoff – percussion, drums
- Russell Broom – electric guitar
- Lenny Castro – percussion
- Jennifer Condos – bass guitar
- Debra Dobkin – percussion
- Lin Elder – background vocals
- Mark Goldenberg – acoustic guitar, piano, electric guitar, 12 string guitar
- James "Hutch" Hutchinson – bass
- Jim Keltner – percussion, drums
- Greg Leisz – acoustic guitar, pedal steel, bass, slide guitar, lap steel guitar
- Mike Lent – bass
- Dillon O'Brian – background vocals
- Bill Reichenbach Jr. – bass trombone
- Jeffrey C.J. Vanston – synthesizer, piano, keyboards, Wurlitzer

== Production ==
- Producers: Jann Arden, Ed Cherney, Mark Goldenberg
- Executive producer: Neil MacGonigill
- Associate producer: Shari Sutcliffe
- Engineers: Ed Cherney, Mark Goldenberg, Duane Seykora
- Assistant engineers: Sebastian Haimerl, Bob Salcedo, Mike Scotella
- Mixing: Ed Cherney, Duane Seykora
- Mixing assistant: Stuart Brawley
- Mastering: Doug Sax
- Arranger: Mark Goldenberg
- Percussion programming: Jeffrey C.J. Vanston
- Art direction: Karen Walker

== Charts ==
Chart performance for Happy?
Chart (1998)	Peak position
Canadian Albums (Billboard)	7
