= That's the Way It Goes (Anne Murray song) =

Single by Anne Murray

from the album Anne Murray
- Released: 1997
- Genre: Country
- Length: 4:24
- Songwriter(s): Kerry Chater, Lynn Gillespie Chater, Cyril Rawson

Anne Murray singles chronology
"Me Too" (1996)	"That's the Way It Goes" (1997)	"Let There Be Love" (1997)

"That's the Way It Goes" is a song written by Kerry Chater, Lynn Gillespie Chater, and Cyril Rawson and performed by Anne Murray. The song reached #19 on the Canadian Adult Contemporary chart in 1997. The song appeared on her 1996 album, Anne Murray.

== Charts ==
Chart (1997)	Peak position
Canadian RPM Adult Contemporary	19
