= Jann Arden Live with the Vancouver Symphony Orchestra =

Live album by Jann Arden
- Released: October 15, 2002
- Recorded: March 6 & 7, 2002
- Length: 69:00
- Label: Universal Music
- Producer: Jann Arden, Ed Cherney

Jann Arden chronology
Greatest Hurts: The Best of Jann Arden (2001)	Jann Arden Live with the Vancouver Symphony Orchestra (2002)	Love is the Only Soldier (2003)

Jann Arden Live with the Vancouver Symphony Orchestra is a 2002 live album by Jann Arden, recorded in conjunction with the Vancouver Symphony Orchestra.

== Track listing ==
1. "Could I Be Your Girl?" (Arden)
2. "Waiting in Canada" (Arden, Broom)
3. "You Don't Know Me" (Arnold, Walker)
4. "The Sound Of" (Arden)
5. "Mend" (Arden, Broom)
6. "I Would Die for You" (Arden)
7. "Saved" (Richards, Vanston)
8. "Sorry for Myself" (Arden, Broom)
9. "Never Mind" (Arden)
10. "Good Mother" (Arden, Foster)
11. "Make It Christmas Day" (Arden)
