= Anne Loree =

Canadian singer-songwriter

Anne Loree is a Canadian singer-songwriter from Edmonton, Alberta, Canada. Best known as the writer of "Insensitive", an international Top 40 hit for Jann Arden in 1995, Loree has also released four albums as a solo performer.

"Insensitive" spent three weeks at No. 1 on the Top Singles Canadian chart in late January and early February 1995.

Loree was nominated for Songwriter of the Year at the 1996 Juno Awards.

== Discography ==
- Beyond Cinderella (1998)
- roAr (2002)
- The Mullet Years (2005)
- Leaving Shadowland (2005)
