= Blood Red Cherry =

Studio album by Jann Arden
- Released: March 21, 2000
- Recorded: 1999
- Genre: Adult alternative
- Length: 57:49
- Label: Universal Music
- Producer: Mark Goldenberg

Jann Arden chronology
Happy? (1997)	Blood Red Cherry (2000)	Greatest Hurts: The Best of Jann Arden (2001)

Professional ratings
Review scores
Source	Rating
Allmusic	link

Blood Red Cherry is the fourth studio album by Canadian singer-songwriter Jann Arden, released in 2000. (See 2000 in music.)

== Track listing ==
All songs written by Jann Arden and Russell Broom, except where noted.

1. "Waiting in Canada" – 3:43
2. "Cherry Popsicle" – 3:37
3. "Sleepless" – 4:38
4. "Never Give Up on Me" – 4:06
5. "Mend" – 4:11
6. "I Only Wanted Sex" – 3:38
7. "Taste of This" – 4:39
8. "Into the Sun" – 4:17
9. "In Your Keeping" – 3:59
10. "Best Dress" – 2:39
11. "Another Human Being" – 5:40
12. "Sorry for Myself" – 3:56
13. "Janeen" – 3:41
14. "Piece of It All" (Broom) – 5:05

== Personnel ==
- Jann Arden – vocals, background vocals
- Gregg Bissonette – cymbals, drums
- Jennifer Condos – bass guitar
- Allison Cornell – viola
- Jim Cuddy – background vocals
- Davey Faragher – bass
- Mark Goldenberg – keyboards
- Rami Jaffee – keyboards, Hammond organ
- Mauricio-Fritz Lewak – percussion
- Dillon O'Brian – background vocals
- John Philip Shenale – keyboards

== Production ==
- Producer: Mark Goldenberg
- Executive producer: Jann Arden
- Assistant engineers: Ok Hee Kim, Ronnie Rivera
- Drum Loop: Mark Goldenberg
- Mixing: Ronnie Rivera
- Mastering: Doug Saks
- Drum loop: John Philip Shenale
- Production coordination: Shari Sutcliffe
- Contractor: Shari Sutcliffe
- Design: Jeth Weinrich
- Photography: Jeth Weinrich

== Charts ==
Album – Billboard (North America)

Year	Chart	Position
2000	Top Canadian Albums	4

=== Year-end charts ===
Year-end chart performance for Another Rosie Christmas
Chart (2000)	Position
Canadian Albums (Nielsen SoundScan)	140
