= Uncover Me =

Studio album by Jann Arden
- Released: February 6, 2007
- Genre: Adult alternative
- Label: Universal Music Canada
- Producer: Jann Arden, Russell Broom

Jann Arden chronology
Jann Arden (2005)	Uncover Me (2007)	Free (2009)

Professional ratings
Review scores
Source	Rating
Allmusic	3/5 stars

Uncover Me is the seventh album from Canadian singer-songwriter Jann Arden, released in 2007. "Counterfeit Heart" is the only track written by Jann Arden (co-written with SHeDAISY's Kristyn Osborn). Three additional tracks from these sessions, "Moon River", "What the World Needs Now", and "End of the World", are available from her Myspace site. The album was her best selling-record in Canada in a decade.

Lead single "Bring the Boys Home" (originally by Freda Payne) became a Top 10 hit in her homeland. Further airplay singles "At Seventeen", "California Dreamin'" and "Son of a Preacher Man" were made popular by Janis Ian, the Mamas and the Papas, and Dusty Springfield respectively. Other covers include "Peace Train" by Cat Stevens, "Love is a Battlefield" by Pat Benatar, "You're So Vain" by Carly Simon, "Downtown" by Petula Clark and "Solitaire" by Neil Sedaka.

== Track listing ==
1. "Bring the Boys Home" (Angelo Bond, General Johnson, Greg Perry)
2. "California Dreamin'" (Michelle Phillips, John Phillips)
3. "Peace Train" (Cat Stevens)
4. "At Seventeen" (Janis Ian)
5. "Love Is a Battlefield" (Holly Knight, Mike Chapman)
6. "Son of a Preacher Man" (John Hurley, Ronnie Wilkins)
7. "Counterfeit Heart" (Arden, Kristyn Osborn)
8. "You're So Vain" (Carly Simon)
9. "Downtown" (Tony Hatch)
10. "Solitaire" (Neil Sedaka, Phil Cody)

== Uncover Me Tour ==
Arden followed up on the album with her Uncover Me Tour, during the months of April and May 2007. The tour spanned across Canada.

== Chart performance ==
Chart (2007)	Peak position
Canadian Albums (Billboard)	3

== Certifications ==
Region	Certification
Canada (Music Canada)	Platinum
