= Jann Arden (album) =

Studio album by Jann Arden
- Released: April 12, 2005
- Genre: Adult alternative
- Length: 51:44
- Label: Universal Music Canada
- Producer: Jann Arden, Russell Broom

Jann Arden chronology
Love Is the Only Soldier (2003)	Jann Arden (2005)	Uncover Me (2007)

Jann Arden is the sixth album from Canadian singer Jann Arden, released in 2005. In addition to 11 new songs, the album features a new version of "I Would Die For You", Arden's first major chart hit in her native Canada, with guest vocals by Sarah McLachlan.

The album debuted at number 3 on the Canadian album sales charts in its first week of release, Arden's highest debut in her 12-year career.

== Track listing ==
1. "Calling God"
2. "Where No One Knows Me"
3. "I'd Be Glad"
4. "Why Do I Try"
5. "All of This"
6. "How Good Things Are"
7. "Life is Sweet"
8. "Willing to Fall Down"
9. "A Perfect Day"
10. "Beautiful Pain"
11. "Rock This Girl"
12. "I Would Die For You" (guest vocals by Sarah McLachlan.)

== Chart performance ==
Chart (2005)	Peak position
Canadian Albums (Billboard)	3

== Certifications ==
Region	Certification
Canada (Music Canada)	Gold
