= This Child =

Studio album by Susan Aglukark
- Released: 24 January 1995
- Genre: Folk, pop, country
- Length: 48:50
- Label: EMI
- Producer: Chad Irschick

Susan Aglukark chronology
Christmas (1993)	This Child (1995)	Unsung Heroes (2000)

Professional ratings
Review scores
Source	Rating
Allmusic	4.5/5 stars

This Child is the second album by Susan Aglukark, released on 24 January 1995. The album was Susan's commercial breakthrough in Canada, spawning chart hits with "O Siem" and "Hina Na Ho (Celebration)"; the album made Aglukark the first Inuk performer ever to have a Top 40 hit.

This album was also released in Japan on 6 September 1995, with the catalog number of TOCP-8650.

== Track listing ==
1. "This Child" (Aglukark, Irschick) - 6:26
2. "Shamaya" (Aglukark) - 4:34
3. "Suffer in Silence" (Kirkpatrick, Sprague) - 3:58
4. "O Siem" (Aglukark, Irschick) - 4:27
5. "Dreams for You" (Aglukark) - 3:57
6. "Hina Na Ho (Celebration)" (Susan Aglukark, Chad Irschick, John Landry) - 4:11
7. "Kathy I" (Aglukark, Kelita Haverland) - 4:31
8. "Pond Inlet" (Aglukark, Irschick) - 3:57
9. "Slippin' Through the Cracks" (Bill Candy) - 3:21
10. "Breakin' Down" (Aglukark, Candy, Haverland, Irschick) - 3:47
11. "Casualties of War" (Aglukark, Irschick) - 5:41

== Musicians ==
- Susan Aglukark: Lead vocals
- Michael Francis: Guitars, mandolin
- Tom Szczesniak: Bass, synthesizer, piano
- Ray Parker: Piano, organ, synthesiser
- Claude Desjardins: Drums, percussion
- Chad Irschick: Synthesizer, percussion
- Brian Leonard: Percussion
- Backing vocals: David Blamires, Debbie Fleming, Neil Donell, John Rutledge
- Outro vocal: Jesse Park-Wheeler
- Violins: Mark Skazinetsky, Young Dae Park, Wendy Rose, Vera Tarnowsky
- Violas: Doug Perry, Dan Blackman
- Cellos: David R. Hetherington, Ron Laurie

== Chart performance ==
Chart (1995)	Peak position
Canadian RPM Country Albums	1
Canadian RPM Top Albums	25
