= Ed Cherney =

American record producer (1950–2019)

- Born: Edward Cherney; 1950; Chicago, Illinois, U.S.
- Died: October 22, 2019 (aged 69)
- Occupations: Recording engineer, record producer
- Website: edcherney.com

Edward Cherney (1950 – October 22, 2019) was an American recording engineer and record producer, based in Los Angeles, California, United States. Over his career, he earned four Grammy Awards, one Emmy Award, and five TEC Awards. Cherney was also known within the film world for his work on A Mighty Wind, The Bourne Legacy, and Fast Times at Ridgemont High.

== Biography ==
=== Early career ===
Cherney grew up in Chicago, Illinois, United States. After finishing college, he considered going to law school. He was a hobby musician growing up, but never a professional one. A group of friends had a band, and were about to go on the road. They asked Cherney if he would drive the truck and roadie for them. One day while on the road, the soundman did not show up to a gig and Cherney ended up mixing the band. The gig went well, and he realized he had an affinity for mixing audio. Later that summer, the band invited him into the studio for his first time. A bell went off and Cherney immediately realized that this was what he was meant to do.

Instead of going to law school, Cherney enrolled in DeVry University to study electronics. He continued working with bands before landing a job at a local P.A. company in Chicago. In an industry magazine, he read about a recording course taught by producer/engineer Bruce Swedien. While attending the course, Cherney befriended Swedien, and started to follow him around studios in Chicago. Cherney landed his first studio job as an apprentice engineer at Paragon Recording Studios in Chicago - working his way up the ranks over the next three years.

=== 1978 to 2019 ===
After leaving Paragon Recording Studios, Cherney moved to Los Angeles. He called around to local studios, and landed a job as an assistant engineer at Westlake Recording Studios. After about a month at Westlake, Bruce Swedien and Quincy Jones came into the studio to work on Michael Jackson's Off the Wall record. Cherney worked as an assistant engineer for the producer/engineer pair for the next 6 years.

Cherney went on to engineer records for Iggy Pop, Bonnie Raitt, Sting, Eric Clapton, Jann Arden, Jackson Browne, Bob Dylan, the Rolling Stones, Wynton Marsalis, Lenny Kravitz, Keb' Mo', Buddy Guy and many more.

Cherney worked out of his personal studio, "Studio Ed", at The Village.

Cherney joined the McNally Smith College of Music board of directors on April 6, 2011. He died from cancer on October 22, 2019.

Cherney lived in the historic 1905 Venice Canals. Cherney served on the Venice Canals Association Board of Directors. The VCA served to protect, preserve and enhance the historic Venice Canals.

== Awards and honors ==
Cherney had more than 350 album credits, five Grammy Award nominations, four Grammy wins, an Emmy Award, and five TEC Awards After winning five TEC Awards, he was inducted into the TEC Awards Hall of Fame in 2015.

=== Grammy Awards ===
Year	Category	Title	Note
1994	Best Engineered Album - Non-Classical	Longing in Their Hearts	Bonnie Raitt
2003	Best Traditional Blues Album	Blues Singer	Buddy Guy
2016	Best Traditional Pop Vocal Album	Summertime: Willie Nelson Sings Gershwin	Willie Nelson
2018	Best Traditional Pop Vocal Album	My Way	Willie Nelson

=== Emmy Awards ===
Year	Category	Title
2015	Outstanding Sound Mixing For A Limited Series Or A Movie	Bessie
