= Jann Arden =

Canadian singer-songwriter, actress (b. 1962)

Jann Arden CM
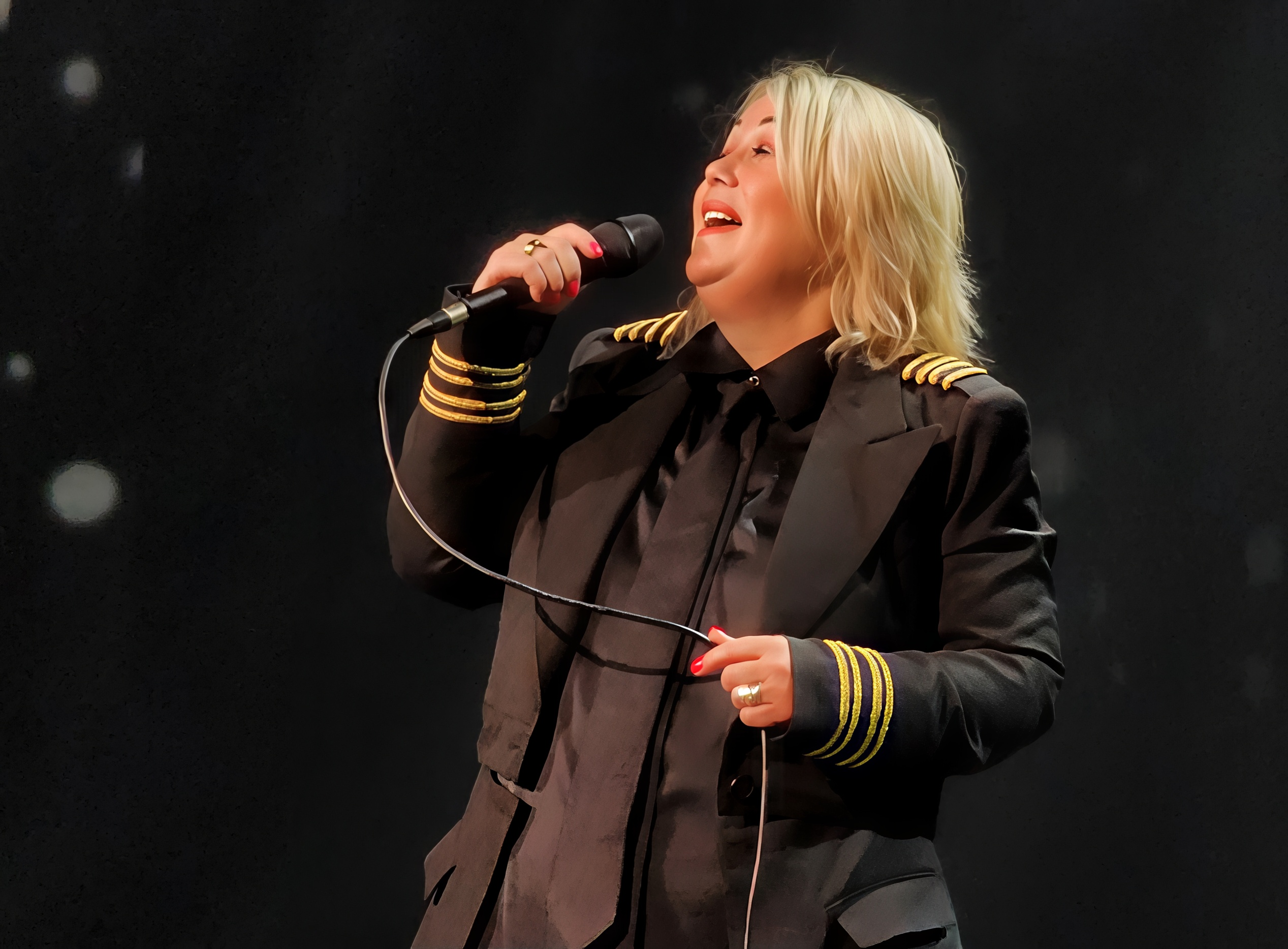
- Arden performing in Windsor, Ontario in August 2023

Background information
- Born: Jann Arden Richards; March 27, 1962 (age 64); Calgary, Alberta, Canada
- Genre: Pop
- Occupation: Singer-songwriter-Liberal Activist
- Instruments: Vocals, guitar
- Years active: 1981–present
- Labels: A&M, Universal
- Spouse: Thordis Elva (m. 2026)
- Website: www.jannarden.com

Jann Arden CM (born Jann Arden Richards; March 27, 1962) is a Canadian singer-songwriter, author and actress. She is best known for her signature ballads, "Could I Be Your Girl" and "Insensitive", which is her biggest hit to date, as well as other ballads, such as "Cherry Popsicle" and "I Would Die for You".

== Early life and education ==
Jann Arden was born in Calgary and moved as a child to Springbank, Alberta, where she attended Springbank Community High School. Her father, Derrel Richards, was a construction contractor and her mother, Joan Bentley, was a dental assistant. She is the middle child of three children.

Arden grew up in a troubled family dynamic. Her father was an abusive alcoholic. Her brother was convicted of the first-degree murder of 21 year-old Carrie Louise Marshall in Creston, British Columbia, and was incarcerated in Alberta in 1992.

After she graduated high school, Arden settled in Vancouver and sang with a series of bar bands. With these bands, she would sing cover songs of Led Zeppelin, Tina Turner, and Billie Holiday in a variety of locations including lounges, bars and ski resorts. During this time, Arden had attempted to launch a solo singing career; however, she was battling a bout of alcoholism which held her back.

== Career ==
Arden released her first single, "Never Love a Sailor", on the Canadian label Circa in 1981 under the name Jann Richards. She was discovered in 1985 by Calgary manager Neil MacGonigill. MacGonigill worked with Arden from 1985 to 1998; he both managed her career and acted as executive producer of her earlier albums. The two subsequently became estranged.

Arden released her critically acclaimed debut album, Time for Mercy, in 1993, and followed with a single "I Would Die For You". Both were credited among the six Alberta Recording Industry Awards won by Arden in 1994.

Arden's 1994 album Living Under June featured her biggest hit to date outside of Canada, "Insensitive", which was released as a single from the soundtrack to the Christian Slater film Bed of Roses (number 12 on the U.S. Billboard Hot 100). Another single from that same album, "Could I Be Your Girl", has also had significant and consistent airplay on Canadian adult contemporary radio and featured a dance remix version which circulated on pop radio at the time.

Subsequent albums include 1997's Happy?, 2000's Blood Red Cherry, and 2003's Love Is the Only Soldier. Arden also released a greatest hits album, Greatest Hurts, in 2001, and a live album, Jann Arden Live with the Vancouver Symphony Orchestra (2002). In 2005, she released her eighth album (her sixth album of new material), self-titled Jann Arden.

In 1998, respondents to Chart magazine's year-end reader's poll named Arden the Canadian celebrity most deserving of her own talk show.

Arden revealed that one of her brothers is serving a life sentence in prison and that her song "Hangin' by a Thread" is dedicated to him. Arden released her ninth album, Uncover Me, on February 6, 2007. This album was her first comprising cover songs exclusively, except for one original piece, "Counterfeit Heart". This was followed by her Uncover Me Tour across Canada during the spring of 2007.

On the weekend of March 24, 2007, Arden was admitted to intensive care for heart-related concerns, diagnosed as Takotsubo cardiomyopathy, a condition commonly associated with acute stress and exhaustion.

Arden had a 2007 USA summer tour with Michael Bublé. In 2010, they also carried the Olympic torch. She co-wrote his 2013 song "Close Your Eyes".

In September 2009, Arden released her tenth album, Free, and its first single, "A Million Miles Away," in June. She then began a cross-country Canadian tour in November 2009, with some proceeds going to the "Raise-a-Reader Concert Series".

In November 2010, Arden released her first ever live CD and DVD set, entitled Spotlight. Her latest autobiography, Falling Backwards, was released on November 1, 2011, along with a second album of cover songs, Uncover Me 2. Arden's thirteenth album, Everything Almost, was released April 29, 2014, through Universal Music Canada. In October 2015, Arden released her fourteenth and first Christmas album, A Jann Arden Christmas.

In addition to her music, Arden has also written memoirs: If I Knew, Don't You Think I'd Tell You? (2002), I'll Tell You One Damn Thing, and That's All I Know! (2004), Falling Backwards (2011) and Feeding My Mother (2017).

Published in 2017, Arden's book Feeding My Mother: Comfort and Laughter in the Kitchen as My Mom Lives with Memory Loss, relates her involvement with her mother while the latter was experiencing Alzheimer's. She discussed that era in the book:

"I am a mother to my mother. It's a massive learning curve, not only because I didn't have children of my own, but because there isn't a handbook telling me what I should or shouldn't be doing. Alzheimer's is a different disease for every single person it inhabits. Everything is trial by fire."

Released in 2018, Arden's album These are the Days includes 11 songs about the most difficult time in her life. In a CBC interview, she recalled, "My mom and dad both were diagnosed with basically dementia and Alzheimer's and a litany of other things. My health wasn't great. I was floundering".

In 2018, Arden launched The Business of Life, a lifestyle podcast on topics such as entrepreneurship, motherhood, writing, relationships and navigating life challenges, which she cohosts with Arlene Dickinson.

In October 2018, it was announced that Arden had been confirmed as a celebrity judge on CTV's music series, The Launch. While on the show, Arden mentored Winnipeg based singer-songwriter Olivia Lunny.

In a June 6, 2023, appearance on The Marilyn Denis Show, Arden announced that she had written a novel, which was slated for publication in November.

On January 31, 2025, she released Mixtape, an album of mostly 1990s pop covers that originally began as an idea for a collection of 1970s. Arden said her record label intervened early in the process and convinced her to reconsider the project with a more contemporary collection of popular hits. She said she hoped leftover songs from the original idea might later see a release.

== Personal life ==
Until 2025, Arden remained mostly private about her personal life, including romantic relationships. In 2019, she told The Canadian Press while promoting her sitcom Jann, which features a fictional version of her in a relationship with a woman, that she considered herself "fluid." She said earlier in her career she felt pressured to "stand under a word," be it gay, straight or bisexual. She said she had chosen to keep her relationships private for the sake of her partners. This changed in July 2025, when Arden's relationship with writer and activist Thordis Elva was widely reported and confirmed by both parties on social media, with Arden exclaiming "How lucky am I?" Arden and Elva announced their engagement on December 31, 2025. The couple were married on August 15, 2026.

Arden has also been open about her love for animals. In 2012, she garnered some attention when VIA Rail kicked her and her dog off a train. She also posted about her dog Midi's death in 2021.

== Acting ==
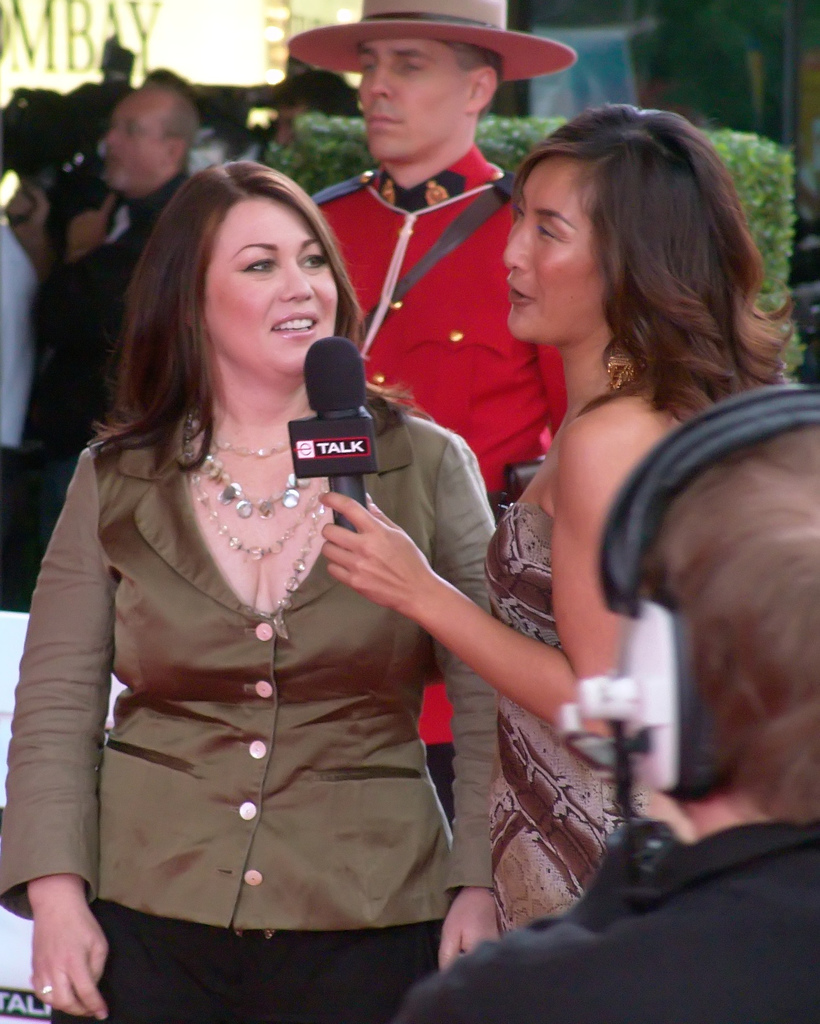
Arden (left), being interviewed on television, 2006

Arden has also worked as an actress, with supporting or guest roles in the television series Robson Arms, Corner Gas, Hell on Wheels, The Detour, Workin' Moms and Wynonna Earp. She received a Canadian Screen Award nomination for Supporting Actress in a Comedy Series at the 7th Canadian Screen Awards in 2019, for her appearances as Jane Carlson in Workin' Moms.

In June 2018, CTV announced that Arden would star in Jann, a comedy television series based on a "fictionalized version" of her own life. The series premiered on March 20, 2019. During the promotion of the series, in which the fictionalized version of Arden is depicted as having recently broken up with a long-term female partner, Arden spoke openly to the press for the first time about having been in relationships with both men and women throughout her life. As of March 2019, Jann is Canada's most popular comedy TV series, drawing more than one million viewers per episode. At the 8th Canadian Screen Awards in 2020, she received a nomination for Best Actress in a Comedy Series.

She has also performed on stage in productions of The Vagina Monologues, in film as Blanche the snack counter lady in the 2022 film Vandits, and had a voice role as R0-FL, the robot sidekick of Overlord, in the family sitcom Overlord and the Underwoods.

She appeared as Pippa Pearson, co-owner of the York Lawn Tennis Club, in an episode of Murdoch Mysteries, "Game Set, Murdoch" that aired February 2, 2026.

== Accolades ==
Arden has received a total of 19 Juno Award nominations to date. She has won eight of them, including solo artist of the year in 1994, Songwriter of the Year in 1995 and 2002, and Female Artist of the Year in 1995 and 2001. She has also won awards at the MuchMusic Video Awards, the Prairie Music Awards, the Western Canadian Music Awards and at the ARIA (Alberta Recording Industry Association) Awards.

She has 17 top ten singles from eight albums.

In March 2006, it was announced that she would receive a star on Canada's Walk of Fame. In November 2006, Arden received the National Achievement Award from the Society of Composers, Authors, and Music Publishers of Canada (SOCAN) for having six singles reach the 100,000 airplay mark on Canadian radio. She was awarded the prize at a gala in Toronto.

In November 2007, Arden was inducted into the Canadian Association of Broadcasters Hall of Fame, and was the winner of the International Achievement Award at the 2007 Western Canadian Music Awards.

In 2012, Arden was awarded the Queen's Diamond Jubilee Medal.

On December 29, 2017, Arden was appointed as a Member of the Order of Canada for her 'achievements as a singer-songwriter and broadcaster, and for her extensive charitable work.'

In 2020, Arden was named by the Canadian Academy of Recording Arts and Sciences as its 2020 inductee into the Canadian Music Hall of Fame; however, due to the cancellation of the Juno Awards of 2020 during the COVID-19 pandemic in Canada, she actually received her induction tribute at the Juno Awards of 2021.

She won two Canadian Screen Awards at the 9th Canadian Screen Awards in 2021, for Best Host in a Talk Show or Entertainment News Show for her 2019 special Jann Arden One Night Only, and Best Host of a Live Entertainment Event for her role as host of the 2019 Giller Prize ceremony.

== Appearances ==
Arden has made a number of charity appearances, including in Africa for World Vision, performing at Live 8 and the MAC Cosmetics Fashion Cares AIDS benefits. She also appeared in the opening segment of an episode from the sitcom Ellen starring Ellen DeGeneres, which originally aired on January 8, 1997.

She toured with Michael Bublé on the US and European legs of his 2005 tour, and again toured with him on his 2007 US tour. She sang "O Canada" at the 2006 NBA All-Star Game. She was the judge in the elimination portion of episode 13 of season three of Top Chef Canada, "Wild Rose Finale".

At the 2006 Juno Awards, to counter host Pamela Anderson's on-stage appeal against Maritime seal hunting, Arden generated cheers and controversy when she joked that her bra was "made entirely of seal eyelids".

"Run Like Mad" was originally recorded as the international theme song for Dawson's Creek; however, it was only used for the first season. The song was used again on the DVD sets for seasons 3–6 when Paula Cole's "I Don't Want to Wait" became too expensive to license. Arden's songs "Good Mother," "You Don't Know Me," "Hangin' By A Thread," "Mend," "In Your Keeping," and "Sleepless" were also featured on the series, with "Good Mother" being featured in two separate episodes.

== Discography ==
- Time for Mercy (1993)
- Living Under June (1994)
- Happy? (1997)
- Blood Red Cherry (2000)
- Love Is the Only Soldier (2003)
- Jann Arden (2005)
- Uncover Me (2007)
- Free (2009)
- Uncover Me 2 (2011)
- Everything Almost (2014)
- A Jann Arden Christmas (2015)
- These Are the Days (2018)
- Descendant (2022)
- Mixtape (2025)
