= Singers and Songwriters (Time-Life Music) =

19-volume album series

Singers and Songwriters was a 19-volume album series issued by Time-Life in the US, during the early 2000s, spotlighting songs from the singer-songwriter era of the 1970s. There was an identically-named 29 volume series available in the UK and Europe, with different track listings and different, but similar artwork. Songs on the series included music written and performed by an artist, and artists who covered a well-known songwriter's material; as such, a large majority of the music was stylistically similar to what was heard on soft rock and (sometimes) contemporary hit radio stations during the 1970s and early 1980s.

Much like Time-Life's other series chronicling popular music, volumes in the "Singers and Songwriters" series covered a specific time period, including two-year spans in some volumes and parts of a given decade in others. Each volume was issued on a compact disc or cassette. Individual volumes generally contained two albums of 12 tracks each (24 songs per volume), and represented the highlighted time period's most popular and noteworthy tracks. The UK/European series had 15 tracks per disc making 30 tracks per volume. Also included was a booklet, containing liner notes written by some of the most respected historians of the genre, photographs of the artists, and information on the songs (writers, performers and peak position on Billboard magazine's Hot 100 chart).

== History ==
"Singers and Songwriters" was first issued in the US in the winter of 2000, with the first volume in the series titled Singers and Songwriters: 1972–1973. As was the case with Time-Life's other series, "Singers and Songwriters" was advertised in television and magazine advertisements. The series was available by subscription (by calling a 1-800 number); those who purchased the series in that fashion received a new volume roughly every other month (on the format of their choice), and had the option of keeping the volumes they wanted.

Each volume was also offered for individual sale. When the series was fully issued, a customer could purchase the entire series at once (or a group of albums, as packaged by Time-Life as part of a promotion), often at a discounted price.

New volumes continued to be issued through 2002, the final one being a volume titled Singers and Songwriters: Hard to Find Hits; an additional single-disc volume not included in the subscription series (but available for sale) was titled Singers and Songwriters: The Classics. Time-Life continued to offer "Singers and Songwriters" through the latter half of the 2000s.

All told, the US series had 432 tracks (429 songs with three titles repeated on various volumes). The UK/European series was much more expansive, finally comprising 870 tracks.

However, due to licensing restrictions, some of the songs in the original series were replaced with other songs instead, Artists like Gilbert O'Sullivan, Bob Seger, Neil Young, and some of the familiar songs from James Taylor, including "You've Got A Friend", "Shower the People", and the more familiar songs from Joni Mitchell, including "You Turn Me On, I'm a Radio", and "Help Me", and Paul Simon, including "50 Ways to Leave your Lover", and "Mother and Child Reunion", and "Loves Me like a Rock" could not be included, due to the demands and high expenses imposed though the publishing companies The Gilbert O'Sullivan song "Alone Again Naturally" was omitted in the later collection due to the licensing restrictions issues. The song "Fool, If you think it's Over" by Chris Rea, is a different version of the song. In the original version Rea's voice was sped up. Rea was never happy with that recording and although a hit in the US wanted the original version buried. The re-recording is Rea singing in his normal voice. The Stevie Nicks song, plus the songs that Nicks did with Fleetwood Mac, could not be used in this collection, due to the same licensing restrictions.

== The US series ==
As with many of Time-Life Records' multi-volume releases, the volumes were not issued in a logical, sequential order by date or era of the subject; that is, issuing volumes covering the 1960s before progressing into the 1970s. In the track information section, the volumes will be listed sequentially by era; the following list is the order in which the volumes were released. Also, unlike their other compilation series, Singers and Songwriters includes the album versions of songs rather than the single or radio edits.

=== 2000 ===
- Singers and Songwriters: 1972–1973
- Singers and Songwriters: 1970–1971
- Singers and Songwriters: 1974–1975
- Singers and Songwriters: 1976–1977
- Singers and Songwriters: 1978–1979
- Singers and Songwriters: The '60s

=== 2001 ===
- Singers and Songwriters: 1980–1982
- Singers and Songwriters: The Mid '70s
- Singers and Songwriters: The Early '70s
- Singers and Songwriters: The Late '70s
- Singers and Songwriters: 1970–1974
- Singers and Songwriters: 1975–1979
- Singers and Songwriters: 1979–1989
- Singers and Songwriters: 1964–1969
- Singers and Songwriters: The '70s
- Singers and Songwriters: 1969–1972
- Singers and Songwriters: The Classics

=== 2002 ===
- Singers and Songwriters: 1973–1975
- Singers and Songwriters: Hard to Find Hits

=== 2004 ===
- Singers and Songwriters: Lady Writers

=== 2010 ===
- Singers & Songwriters: Troubadours

The UK/European Series

All of the European series had the prefix TL SSW/nn where nn is the catalogue number. There were 28 titles in the series plus a Christmas album with a different catalogue number. They were all double CDs with 15 tracks on each disc, making a total of 870 tracks, double the total number of the US series.

2001

TL SSW/01 – Singers and Songwriters 1973–1976

TL SSW/02 – Singers and Songwriters 1970–1972

TL SSW/03 – Singers and Songwriters 1977–1979

TL SSW/04 – Singers and Songwriters 1965–1969

TL SSW/05 – Singers and Songwriters 1980–1983

TL SSW/06 – Singers and Songwriters The Classics

TL SSW/07 – Singers and Songwriters Late 60s

TL SSW/08 – Singers and Songwriters Early 70s

TL SSW/09 – Singers and Songwriters Late 70s

2002

TL SSW/10 – Singers and Songwriters Early 80s

TL SSW/11 – Singers and Songwriters 1970–1974

TL SSW/12 – Singers and Songwriters 1975–1979

TL SSW/13 – Singers and Songwriters 1964–1969

TL SSW/14 – Singers and Songwriters 1980–1986

TL SSW/15 – Singers and Songwriters The Originals

2003

TL SSW/16 – Singers and Songwriters The Folk Years

TL SSW/17 – Singers and Songwriters Diary

TL SSW/18 – Singers and Songwriters Storytellers

TL SSW/19 – Singers and Songwriters All Through The 89s

TL SSW/20 – Singers and Songwriters Mavericks

TL SSW/21 – Singers and Songwriters Made In Australia (released 2002)

TL SSW/22 – Singers and Songwriters 1960–1964

TL SSW/23 – Singers and Songwriters Protest Songs

TL SSW/24 – Singers and Songwriters Pure and Simple

2004

TL SSW/25 – Singers and Songwriters Allstars

TL SSW/26 – Singers and Songwriters Lady Writers

TL SSW/27 – Singers and Songwriters Once Upon A Time In The West

TL SSW/28 – Singers and Songwriters Country USA

TL XXD/08 – Singers and Songwriters Christmas

== Track listings (US versions) ==
=== Singers and Songwriters: The '60s ===
Disc 1

1. "(Sittin' on) the Dock of the Bay" – Otis Redding
2. "Turn! Turn! Turn! (To Everything There Is a Season)" – The Byrds
3. "Monday Monday" – Mamas and The Papas
4. "Daydream" – The Lovin' Spoonful
5. "San Francisco (Be Sure to Wear Flowers in Your Hair)" – Scott McKenzie
6. "Get Together" – The Youngbloods
7. "You Were on My Mind" – We Five
8. "A Beautiful Morning" – The Rascals
9. "Abraham, Martin and John" – Dion
10. "Both Sides Now" – Judy Collins
11. "Gentle on My Mind" – Glen Campbell
12. "The Weight" – The Band

Disc 2

1. "Mr. Tambourine Man" – The Byrds
2. "California Dreamin'" – Mamas and The Papas
3. "Elusive Butterfly" – Bob Lind
4. "Brown Eyed Girl" – Van Morrison
5. "Society's Child (Baby I've Been Thinking)" – Janis Ian
6. "Something in the Air" – Thunderclap Newman
7. "Everybody's Talkin'" – Harry Nilsson
8. "Different Drum" – The Stone Poneys featuring Linda Rondstadt
9. "Solitary Man" – Neil Diamond
10. "Catch the Wind" – Donovan
11. "Early Morning Rain" – Gordon Lightfoot
12. "To Ramona" – Bob Dylan

=== Singers and Songwriters: 1964–1969 ===
Disc 1

1. "Laugh, Laugh" – Beau Brummels
2. "Ballad of Easy Rider" – The Byrds
3. "Someday Soon" – Judy Collins
4. "Creeque Alley" – Mamas and The Papas
5. "Ode to Billie Joe" – Bobbie Gentry
6. "By the Time I Get to Phoenix" – Glen Campbell
7. "Red Rubber Ball" – The Cyrkle
8. "One" – Three Dog Night
9. "Up On Cripple Creek" – The Band
10. "Stoned Soul Picnic" – The 5th Dimension
11. "Games People Play" – Joe South
12. "Wouldn't It Be Nice – The Beach Boys

Disc 2

1. "Georgy Girl" – The Seekers
2. "Ruby (Don't Take Your Love to Town)" – Kenny Rogers and the First Edition
3. "Light My Fire" – Jose Feliciano
4. "A Summer Song" – Chad And Jeremy
5. "Did You Ever Have to Make Up Your Mind?" – The Lovin' Spoonful
6. "59th Street Bridge Song (Feelin' Groovy)" – Harpers Bizarre
7. "Baby the Rain Must Fall" – Glenn Yarbrough
8. "Son of a Preacher Man" – Dusty Springfield
9. "All I Really Want To Do" – Cher
10. "Lalena" – Donovan
11. "If I Were A Carpenter" – Bobby Darin
12. "Wichita Lineman" – Glen Campbell

=== Singers and Songwriters: 1969–1972 ===
Disc 1

1. "Galveston" – Glen Campbell
2. "Hooked on a Feeling" – B. J. Thomas
3. "Beautiful Sunday" – Daniel Boone
4. "Montego Bay" – Bobby Bloom
5. "Too Busy Thinking About My Baby" – Marvin Gaye
6. "Just My Imagination (Running Away With Me)" – The Temptations
7. "Take A Letter Maria" – R. B. Greaves
8. "Patches" – Clarence Carter
9. "Put a Little Love in Your Heart" – Jackie DeShannon
10. "Baby, Don't Get Hooked on Me" – Mac Davis
11. "Knock Three Times" – Dawn featuring Tony Orlando
12. "Never My Love" – The 5th Dimension

Disc 2

1. "Build Me Up Buttercup" – The Foundations
2. "The Lion Sleeps Tonight" – Robert John
3. "Put Your Hand in the Hand" – Ocean
4. "Rings" – Cymarron
5. "One Tin Soldier (The Legend Of Billy Jack)" – Coven
6. "Precious and Few" – Climax
7. "Jean" – Olliver
8. "Watching Scotty Grow" – Bobby Goldsboro
9. "How Do You Do?" – Mouth & MacNeal
10. "House at Pooh Corner" – Loggins & Messina
11. "Truckin'" – The Grateful Dead
12. "Sunday Morning Coming Down" – Johnny Cash

=== Singers and Songwriters: The '70s ===
Disc 1

1. "Tiny Dancer" – Elton John
2. "Only Love is Real" – Carole King
3. "Reason to Believe" – Rod Stewart
4. "Sail On" – The Commodores
5. "Save It for a Rainy Day" – Stephen Bishop
6. "Sitting" – Cat Stevens
7. "Stir It Up" – Johnny Nash
8. "The Tin Man" – America
9. "Muskrat Love" – The Captain & Tennille
10. "Fool (If You Think It's Over)" – Chris Rea
11. "Lady Blue" – Leon Russell

Disc 2

1. "Never Been to Spain" – Three Dog Night
2. "Sharing the Night Together" – Dr. Hook
3. "Dreidel" – Don McLean
4. "Hummingbird" – Seals & Crofts
5. "I Love" – Tom T. Hall
6. "Love Is a Rose" – Linda Ronstadt
7. "Country Boy (You Got Your Feet in L.A.)" – Glen Campbell
8. "It Don't Matter To Me" – Bread
9. "It's Sad to Belong" – England Dan & John Ford Coley
10. "Never Gonna Fall in Love Again" – Eric Carmen
11. "(Hey, Won't You Play) Another Somebody Done Somebody Wrong Song" – B. J. Thomas
12. "Ain't No Way to Treat a Lady" – Helen Reddy
13. "A Little More Love" – Olivia Newton-John

=== Singers and Songwriters: 1970–1974 ===
Disc 1

1. "It Never Rains in Southern California" – Albert Hammond
2. "Me and You and a Dog Named Boo" – Lobo
3. "We Gotta Get You a Woman" – Todd Rundgren
4. "Use Me" – Bill Withers
5. "It's All Over Now" – Ry Cooder
6. "Make It With You" – Bread
7. "I'd Like to Teach the World to Sing (in Perfect Harmony)" – The New Seekers
8. "We May Never Pass This Way (Again)" – Seals & Crofts
9. "I Just Can't Help Believing" – B. J. Thomas
10. "One Toke Over The Line" – Brewer & Shipley
11. "Love Song" – Anne Murray
12. "Amazing Grace" – Judy Collins

Disc 2

1. "You Wear It Well" – Rod Stewart
2. "Dixie Chicken" – Little Feat
3. "Friend of the Devil" – The Grateful Dead
4. "Never Ending Song of Love" – Delaney and Bonnie & Friends
5. "Danny's Song" – Loggins & Messina
6. "You Don't Mess Around With Jim" – Jim Croce
7. "An Old Fashioned Love Song" – Three Dog Night
8. "I Honestly Love You" – Olivia Newton-John
9. "I Need You" – America
10. "Castles in the Air" – Don McLean
11. "Moonshadow" – Cat Stevens
12. "WOLD" – Harry Chapin

=== Singers and Songwriters: 1970–1971 ===
Disc 1

1. "Maggie May" – Rod Stewart
2. "It's Too Late" – Carole King
3. "Me And Bobby McGee" – Janis Joplin
4. "What's Going On" – Marvin Gaye
5. "Wild World" – Cat Stevens
6. "Ain't No Sunshine" – Bill Withers
7. "Mr. Bojangles" – Nitty Gritty Dirt Band
8. "Woodstock" – Matthews' Southern Comfort
9. "Uncle John's Band" – The Grateful Dead
10. "Here Comes The Sun" – Richie Havens
11. "Love The One You're With" – Stephen Stills
12. "Sunshine" – Jonathan Edwards

Disc 2

1. "Take Me Home, Country Roads" – John Denver with Fat City
2. "Fire And Rain" – James Taylor
3. "Gypsy Woman" – Brian Hyland
4. "Peace Train" – Cat Stevens
5. "He Ain't Heavy, He's My Brother" – The Hollies
6. "That's the Way I've Always Heard It Should Be" – Carly Simon
7. "Mercy Mercy Me (The Ecology)" – Marvin Gaye
8. "The Night They Drove Old Dixie Down" – Joan Baez
9. "If" – Bread
10. "Lay Down (Candles In The Rain)" – Melanie With The Edwin Hawkins Singers
11. "Jealous Guy" – John Lennon And The Plastic Ono Band
12. "Only You Know and I Know" – Dave Mason

=== Singers and Songwriters: 1972–1973 ===
Disc 1

1. "The First Time Ever I Saw Your Face" – Roberta Flack
2. "I Can See Clearly Now" – Johnny Nash
3. "American Pie" – Don McLean
4. "I Got A Name" – Jim Croce
5. "Lean On Me" – Bill Withers
6. "You're So Vain" – Carly Simon
7. "A Horse With No Name" – America
8. "Nights In White Satin" – The Moody Blues
9. "Hello It's Me" – Todd Rundgren
10. "Summer Breeze" – Seals & Crofts
11. "Rocky Mountain High" – John Denver
12. "City of New Orleans" – Arlo Guthrie

Disc 2

1. "My Love" – Paul McCartney & Wings
2. "Time in a Bottle" – Jim Croce
3. "Kodachrome" – Paul Simon
4. "Daniel" – Elton John
5. "Danny's Song" – Anne Murray
6. "Without You" – Nilsson
7. "Just You 'n' Me" – Chicago
8. "Morning Has Broken" – Cat Stevens
9. "All I Know" – Art Garfunkel
10. "Sweet Seasons" – Carole King
11. "Guitar Man" – Bread
12. "Don't Let Me Be Lonely Tonight" – James Taylor

=== Singers and Songwriters: 1973–1975 ===
Disc 1

1. "Brother Louie" – Stories
2. "Jackie Blue" – Ozark Mountain Daredevils
3. "Rock Me Gently" – Andy Kim
4. "Corazón" – Carole King
5. "Workin' at the Car Wash Blues" – Jim Croce
6. "Leave Me Alone (Ruby Red Dress)" – Helen Reddy
7. "Desperado" – Linda Ronstadt
8. "The Morning After" – Maureen McGovern
9. "Daisy Jane" – America
10. "Midnight Train To Georgia" – Gladys Knight & The Pips
11. "The Most Beautiful Girl" – Charlie Rich
12. "Send in the Clowns" – Judy Collins

Disc 2

1. "Love Will Keep Us Together" – The Captain & Tennille
2. "Rhinestone Cowboy" – Glen Campbell
3. "Tie A Yellow Ribbon 'Round the Old Oak Tree" – Dawn featuring Tony Orlando
4. "Shambala" – Three Dog Night
5. "Hooked on a Feeling" – Blue Swede
6. "The Night Chicago Died" – Paper Lace
7. "Billy, Don't Be A Hero" – Bo Donaldson & The Heywoods
8. "I'm Not in Love" – 10cc
9. "Photographs and Memories" – Jim Croce
10. "From Me To You" – Janis Ian
11. "Thinking Of You" – Loggins & Messina
12. "Mr. Tanner" – Harry Chapin

=== Singers and Songwriters: 1974–1975 ===
Disc 1

1. "Annie's Song" – John Denver
2. "Black Water" – The Doobie Brothers
3. "Cat's In The Cradle" – Harry Chapin
4. "Haven't Got Time For The Pain" – Carly Simon
5. "I Shot The Sheriff" – Eric Clapton
6. "Don't Let The Sun Go Down On Me" – Elton John
7. "Sister Golden Hair" – America
8. "Mexico" – James Taylor
9. "You're No Good" – Linda Ronstadt
10. "I Can Help" – Billy Swan
11. "Please Come to Boston" – Dave Loggins
12. "Miracles" – Jefferson Starship

Disc 2

1. "Wildfire" – Michael Murphey
2. "At Seventeen" – Janis Ian
3. "You Are So Beautiful" – Joe Cocker
4. "The Air That I Breathe" – The Hollies
5. "You Won't See Me" – Anne Murray
6. "I'll Have to Say I Love You in a Song" – Jim Croce
7. "Sunshine on My Shoulders" – John Denver
8. "Jazzman" – Carole King
9. "How Long" – Ace
10. "Poetry Man" – Phoebe Snow
11. "Midnight Blue" – Melissa Manchester
12. "Third Rate Romance" – Amazing Rhythm Aces

=== Singers and Songwriters: 1975–1979 ===
Disc 1

1. "You Make Loving Fun" – Fleetwood Mac
2. "Minute By Minute" – The Doobie Brothers
3. "Right Down The Line" – Gerry Rafferty
4. "Have You Never Been Mellow" – Olivia Newton-John
5. "Nights Are Forever Without You" – England Dan & John Ford Coley
6. "Easy" – The Commodores
7. "Love Will Find a Way" – Pablo Cruise
8. "Strange Way" – Firefall
9. "I Only Have Eyes For You" – Art Garfunkel
10. "Chevy Van" – Sammy Johns
11. "Thunder Island" – Jay Ferguson
12. "I Like Dreamin'" – Kenny Nolan

Disc 2

1. "Amie" – Pure Prairie League
2. "How Much I Feel" – Ambrosia
3. "Nightingale" – Carole King
4. "She's Gone" – Daryl Hall And John Oates
5. "Lady" – Little River Band
6. "Today's the Day" – America
7. "Imaginary Lover" – Atlanta Rhythm Section
8. "Count On Me" – Jefferson Starship
9. "Shake It" – Iain Matthews
10. "This Night Won't Last Forever" – Michael Johnson
11. "Someone Saved My Life Tonight" – Elton John
12. "Broken Hearted Me" – Anne Murray

=== Singers and Songwriters: 1976–1977 ===
Disc 1

1. "Still the One" – Orleans
2. "Hello Old Friend" – Eric Clapton
3. "Southern Nights" – Glen Campbell
4. "If You Leave Me Now" – Chicago
5. "Sara Smile" – Hall & Oates
6. "Blue Bayou" – Linda Ronstadt
7. "You Are the Woman" – Firefall
8. "Welcome Back" – John Sebastian
9. "I'd Really Love to See You Tonight" – England Dan & John Ford Coley
10. "Don't Go Breaking My Heart" – Elton John And Kiki Dee
11. "Get Closer" – Seals and Crofts
12. "Dream Weaver" – Gary Wright

Disc 2

1. "Say You Love Me" – Fleetwood Mac
2. "Year Of The Cat" – Al Stewart
3. "On and On" – Stephen Bishop
4. "(Your Love Keeps Lifting Me) Higher and Higher" – Rita Coolidge
5. "Lonely Boy" – Andrew Gold
6. "We Just Disagree" – Dave Mason
7. "Fooled Around and Fell in Love" – Elvin Bishop
8. "Tracks of My Tears" – Linda Ronstadt
9. "Right Time of the Night" – Jennifer Warnes
10. "I'm in You" – Peter Frampton
11. "All By Myself" – Eric Carmen
12. "Lost Without Your Love" – Bread

=== Singers and Songwriters: 1978–1979 ===
Disc 1

1. "Baby Come Back" – Player
2. "Sad Eyes" – Robert John
3. "What A Fool Believes" – The Doobie Brothers
4. "Baker Street" – Gerry Rafferty
5. "Longer" – Dan Fogelberg
6. "It's a Heartache" – Bonnie Tyler
7. "Sometimes When We Touch" – Dan Hill
8. "Reminiscing" – Little River Band
9. "You're Only Lonely" – JD Souther
10. "Time Passages" – Al Stewart
11. "We'll Never Have to Say Goodbye Again" – England Dan & John Ford Coley
12. "Werewolves of London" – Warren Zevon

Disc 2

1. "Just When I Needed You Most" – Randy Vanwarmer
2. "Sultans of Swing" – Dire Straits
3. "Whenever I Call You Friend" – Kenny Loggins with Stevie Nicks
4. "Ooo Baby Baby" – Linda Ronstadt
5. "Sentimental Lady" – Bob Welch
6. "Crazy Love" – Poco
7. "Slip Slidin' Away" – Paul Simon
8. "Gold" – John Stewart
9. "You Belong to Me" – Carly Simon
10. "I Go Crazy" – Paul Davis
11. "Lotta Love" – Nicolette Larson
12. "Think About Me" – Fleetwood Mac

=== Singers and Songwriters: The Early '70s ===
Disc 1

1. "Listen to the Music" – The Doobie Brothers
2. "Operator (That's Not the Way It Feels)" – Jim Croce
3. "Good Time Charlie's Got the Blues" – Danny O'Keefe
4. "Raindrops Keep Fallin' On My Head" – B. J. Thomas
5. "Baby I'm-a Want You" – Bread
6. "Last Song" – Edward Bear
7. "Alone Again (Naturally)" – Gilbert O'Sullivan
8. "Garden Party" – Rick Nelson & the Stone Canyon Band
9. "Drift Away" – Dobie Gray
10. "I Saw The Light" – Todd Rundgren
11. "Taxi" – Harry Chapin
12. "Bridge Over Troubled Water" – Aretha Franklin

Disc 2

1. "Brandy (You're a Fine Girl)" – Looking Glass
2. "Mama Told Me (Not To Come)" – Three Dog Night
3. "Help Me Make It Through the Night" – Sammi Smith
4. "Delta Dawn" – Helen Reddy
5. "The Night The Lights Went Out In Georgia" – Vicki Lawrence
6. "I'd Love You to Want Me" – Lobo
7. "Snowbird" – Anne Murray
8. "Ventura Highway" – America
9. "Don't Pull Your Love" – Hamilton, Joe Frank & Reynolds
10. "Vincent" – Don McLean
11. "Rainy Night in Georgia" – Brook Benton
12. "Coconut" – Nilsson

=== Singers and Songwriters: The Mid '70s ===
Disc 1

1. "Diamond Girl" – Seals & Crofts
2. "Over My Head" – Fleetwood Mac
3. "Goodbye Yellow Brick Road" – Elton John
4. "Lonely People" – America
5. "Wildflower" – Skylark
6. "I'm Not Lisa" – Jessi Colter
7. "When Will I Be Loved" – Linda Ronstadt
8. "Don't Expect Me to Be Your Friend" – Lobo
9. "My Eyes Adored You" – Frankie Valli
10. "Seasons in the Sun" – Terry Jacks
11. "Carolina in the Pines" – Michael Murphey
12. "Love Is Alive" – Gary Wright

Disc 2

1. "Midnight at the Oasis" – Maria Muldaur
2. "Sugar Magnolia" – The Grateful Dead
3. "Laughter in the Rain" – Neil Sedaka
4. "(Hey, Won't You Play) Another Somebody Done Somebody Wrong Song" – B. J. Thomas
5. "Coyote" – Joni Mitchell
6. "Holdin' on to Yesterday" – Ambrosia
7. "Bad, Bad Leroy Brown" – Jim Croce
8. "My Maria" – B. W. Stevenson
9. "Angie Baby" – Helen Reddy
10. "Stuck in the Middle With You" – Stealers Wheels
11. "Dancing in the Moonlight" – King Harvest
12. "Sweet Love" – The Commodores

=== Singers and Songwriters: The Late '70s ===
Disc 1

1. "Lonesome Loser" – Little River Band
2. "So in to You" – Atlanta Rhythm Section
3. "Baby, I Love Your Way" – Peter Frampton
4. "Rich Girl" – Hall & Oates
5. "Sorry Seems to Be the Hardest Word" – Elton John
6. "We're All Alone" – Rita Coolidge
7. "The Things We Do for Love" – 10cc
8. "Escape (The Pina Colada Song)" – Rupert Holmes
9. "Fly Away" – John Denver
10. "When I Need You" – Leo Sayer
11. "Bluer Than Blue" – Michael Johnson
12. "Torn Between Two Lovers" – Mary MacGregor

Disc 2

1. "Don't It Make My Brown Eyes Blue" – Crystal Gayle
2. "Just Remember I Love You" – Firefall
3. "Afternoon Delight" – Starland Vocal Band
4. "It's So Easy" – Linda Ronstadt
5. "Never Gonna Fall in Love Again" – Eric Carmen
6. "Breaking Up Is Hard To Do" – Neil Sedaka
7. "I'm Easy" – Keith Carradine
8. "Magnet and Steel" – Walter Egan
9. "You Needed Me" – Anne Murray
10. "Three Times a Lady" – The Commodores
11. "Love Is the Answer" – England Dan & John Ford Coley
12. "Short People" – Randy Newman

=== Singers and Songwriters: 1979–1989 ===
Disc 1

1. "I've Got a Rock 'n' Roll Heart" – Eric Clapton
2. "Walk of Life" – Dire Straits
3. "Little Lies" – Fleetwood Mac
4. "Sailing" – Christopher Cross
5. "Angel of the Morning" – Juice Newton
6. "Luka" – Suzanne Vega
7. "Steal Away" – Robbie Dupree
8. "Personally" – Karla Bonoff
9. "I'm Alright" – Kenny Loggins
10. "At This Moment" – Billy Vera & The Beaters
11. "(There's) No Gettin' Over Me" – Ronnie Milsap
12. "Him" – Rupert Holmes

Disc 2

1. "You Belong to the City" – Glenn Frey
2. "In The Air Tonight" – Phil Collins
3. "I Want To Know What Love Is" – Foreigner
4. "Got a Hold on Me" – Christine McVie
5. "Chuck E.'s in Love" – Rickie Lee Jones
6. "One Fine Day" – Carole King
7. "The Night Owls" – Little River Band
8. "Key Largo" – Bertie Higgins
9. "More Than I Can Say" – Leo Sayer
10. "It Might Be You" – Stephen Bishop
11. "Let Me Love You Tonight" – Pure Prairie League
12. "Always on My Mind" – Willie Nelson

=== Singers and Songwriters: 1980–1982 ===
Disc 1

1. "Bette Davis Eyes" – Kim Carnes
2. "This Is It" – Kenny Loggins
3. "Cool Change" – Little River Band
4. "Real Love" – The Doobie Brothers
5. "An American Dream" – The Dirt Band
6. "Somebody's Knockin'" – Terri Gibbs
7. "Seven Year Ache" – Rosanne Cash
8. "Hard to Say" – Dan Fogelberg
9. "Late in the Evening" – Paul Simon
10. "Jojo" – Boz Scaggs
11. "You Can Do Magic" – America
12. "Wondering Where the Lions Are" – Bruce Cockburn

Disc 2

1. "I Keep Forgettin' (Every Time You're Near)" – Michael McDonald
2. "Biggest Part of Me" – Ambrosia
3. "Hold Me" – Fleetwood Mac
4. "'65 Love Affair" – Paul Davis
5. "Crying" – Don McLean
6. "Waiting for a Girl Like You" – Foreigner
7. "Ride Like the Wind" – Christopher Cross
8. "Hearts" – Marty Balin
9. "Hurt So Bad" – Linda Ronstadt
10. "While You See a Chance" – Steve Winwood
11. "Jesse" – Carly Simon
12. "Romeo's Tune" – Steve Forbert

=== Singers and Songwriters: Hard to Find Hits ===
Disc 1

1. "All I Want to Be is By Your Side" – Peter Frampton
2. "Make Me Smile" – Chicago
3. "Will You Still Love Me Tomorrow" – Carole King
4. "'Til Tomorrow" – Don McLean
5. "Who Knows Where the Time Goes" – Judy Collins
6. "Jesus on the Mainline" – Ry Cooder
7. "Be Free" – Loggins & Messina
8. "New York's Not My Home" – Jim Croce
9. "Rocky" – Austin Roberts
10. "Help Is on Its Way" – Little River Band
11. "Can't We Try" – Dan Hill with Vonda Shepard
12. "Billy and Sue" – B. J. Thomas

Disc 2

1. "Poor Poor Pitiful Me" – Linda Ronstadt
2. "May You Never" – Eric Clapton
3. "It's a Laugh" – Hall & Oates
4. "Sweet Feelin'" – The Doobie Brothers
5. "Gone Too Far" – England Dan & John Ford Coley
6. "Sequel" – Harry Chapin
7. "I Just Fall in Love Again" – Anne Murray
8. "The Last to Know" – Dan Fogelberg
9. "You're the Only Woman" – Ambrosia
10. "She Believes in Me" – Kenny Rogers
11. "Time is Here and Gone" – The Doobie Brothers
12. "When the Party's Over" – Janis Ian

=== Singers and Songwriters: The Classics ===
(single disc only; 20 tracks)

1. "For What It's Worth" – Buffalo Springfield
2. "Sundown" – Gordon Lightfoot
3. "Everybody's Talkin'" – Nilsson
4. "Your Mama Don't Dance" – Loggins & Messina
5. "Your Song" – Elton John
6. "Still Crazy After All These Years" – Paul Simon
7. "Lowdown" – Boz Scaggs
8. "Still" – The Commodores
9. "Brown-Eyed Girl" – Van Morrison
10. "Anticipation" – Carly Simon
11. "Tonight's The Night (Gonna Be Alright)" – Rod Stewart
12. "So Far Away" – Carole King
13. "Abraham, Martin and John" – Dion
14. "Leaving On A Jet Plane" – Peter, Paul & Mary
15. "Both Sides Now" – Judy Collins
16. "(Sittin' on) the Dock of the Bay" – Otis Redding
17. "If You Could Read My Mind" – Gordon Lightfoot
18. "Everything I Own" – Bread
19. "I'm Sorry" – John Denver
20. "Leader of the Band" – Dan Fogelberg
