= John Ford Coley =

American singer-songwriter (born 1948)

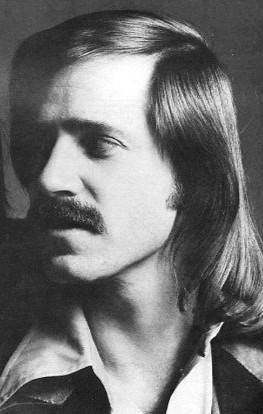
- Coley in 1976

Background information
- Born: John Edward Colley; October 13, 1948 (age 77); Dallas, Texas, U.S.
- Genres: Pop rock; folk; soft rock; country
- Occupation: Singer
- Instruments: Vocals; guitar; piano; keyboards
- Years active: 1966–present
- Labels: A&M Records; Atlantic Records; Hip Records (Stax)
- Formerly of: Theze Few; Southwest F.O.B.; England Dan & John Ford Coley
- Website: johnfordcoley.com

John Ford Coley (born John Edward Colley; October 13, 1948) is an American singer, classically trained pianist, guitarist, actor, and author most known for his partnership in the musical duo England Dan & John Ford Coley.

== Early life ==
Coley was born in Dallas and grew up listening to the Grand Ole Opry, early rock and roll music, singing church hymns, and was trained as a classical pianist. At 16, while at W. W. Samuell High School in Dallas, Coley, along with schoolmate Dan Seals, joined the group Theze Few, which later became Southwest F.O.B. and toured the Texas music scene where they had a hit, "The Smell of Incense". In 1969, it rose to No. 43 on the charts. The band played on the same bill with Led Zeppelin and other acts.

While in the band, Seals and Coley began their own acoustic act, Coley and Wayland. The act was renamed England Dan & John Ford Coley and the duo was signed by A&M Records. In 1971, the two moved to Los Angeles where they opened for numerous bands. Their first break came in 1972 with the song "Simone". It became a No. 1 hit in Japan and was popular in France. However, "Simone" did not fare as well in the United States, and they were released from their contract with A&M after three albums. Coley is a cousin of Grand Ole Opry comedian Minnie Pearl (Sarah Ophelia Colley Cannon).

== Signing to Atlantic Records ==
Two years later, they signed a record deal with Atlantic Records subsidiary Big Tree Records and released the song "I'd Really Love to See You Tonight". Overall they had four top 10 hits and two top 20 hits. They were nominated for a Grammy Award, received triple-platinum and gold records, and released eight albums. Other recordings were released abroad. The duo disbanded in 1980.

== After the 1980s ==
Coley formed another group which released an album on A&M Records: Leslie, Kelly and John Ford Coley (featuring sisters Leslie and Kelly Bulkin). He acted in teen films in the 1980s, acquired a small ranch in the 1990s, and wrote songs for film and television. He returned to touring in 1996. Coley plays with groups and artists including Ambrosia and Terry Sylvester (formerly of The Hollies), Three Dog Night, Lou Gramm of Foreigner, Christopher Cross, Poco, Stephen Bishop, Al Stewart, Edgar Winter, and others.

In 1996, Coley went to the south for Tin Pan South and began going to Nashville performing with the music community. He moved his family and horses to Tennessee in 1999. While in Tennessee, Coley, once a Baháʼí, converted back to Christianity. He continues to perform internationally.

On August 11, 1997, a handyman in Long Island, New York was arrested for impersonating Coley.

== Discography ==
=== Albums ===
- Smell of Incense - Southwest F.O.B., 1969
- England Dan & John Ford Coley - England Dan and John Ford Coley, 1971
- Fables - England Dan and John Ford Coley, 1972
- I Hear Music - England Dan and John Ford Coley, 1976
- Nights Are Forever - England Dan and John Ford Coley, 1976
- Dowdy Ferry Road - England Dan and John Ford Coley, 1977
- Some Things Don't Come Easy - England Dan and John Ford Coley, 1978
- Dr. Heckle and Mr. Jive - England Dan and John Ford Coley, 1979
- Just Tell Me You Love Me - England Dan and John Ford Coley, 1980
- Leslie, Kelly and John Ford Coley - Leslie, Kelly and John Ford Coley, 1980 (A&M Records)
- The Best of England Dan and John Ford Coley - England Dan and John Ford Coley, 1980
- Live from the Philippines - John Ford Coley, 2009
- Eclectic - John Ford Coley, 2016
- Long Way Home (Live in Israel & L.A.) - John Ford Coley, 2020
