= The Best of England Dan and John Ford Coley =

1979 greatest hits album by England Dan & John Ford Coley

The Best of England Dan & John Ford Coley

Greatest hits album by England Dan & John Ford Coley
- Released: December 1979
- Genres: Pop rock; soft rock
- Length: 40:37
- Label: Big Tree

England Dan & John Ford Coley chronology
Dr. Heckle and Mr. Jive (1978)	The Best of England Dan & John Ford Coley (1979)	Just Tell Me You Love Me (1980)

The Best of England Dan & John Ford Coley is a greatest hits album by the pop rock duo England Dan & John Ford Coley, released in 1979, with two new recordings including the minor hit "In It For Love" plus songs from their previous albums on Big Tree Records, an imprint of Atlantic Records.

== Track listing ==
1. "I'd Really Love to See You Tonight" (Parker McGee)
2. "Nights Are Forever Without You" (McGee)
3. "Soldier in the Rain" (John Ford Coley, Sunny Dalton)
4. "It's Sad to Belong" (Randy Goodrum)
5. "What Can I Do with This Broken Heart" (Coley, Dan Seals, Bob Gundry)
6. "In It for Love" (Dennis Henson, Greg Guidry)
7. "Love Is the Answer" (Todd Rundgren)
8. "Falling Stars" (Coley)
9. "We'll Never Have to Say Goodbye Again" (Jeffrey Comanor)
10. "Gone Too Far" (Coley)
11. "Who's Lonely Now" (Seals, Coley)
12. "Why Is It Me" (Seals)
