= List of Billboard Easy Listening number ones of 1978 =

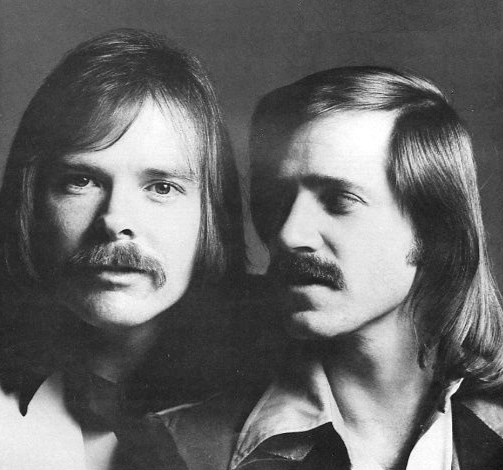
England Dan & John Ford Coley spent six consecutive weeks at number one with "We'll Never Have to Say Goodbye Again".

In 1978, Billboard magazine published a chart ranking the top-performing songs in the United States in the easy listening or middle of the road market. The chart, which in 1978 was entitled Easy Listening, has undergone various name changes and has been published under the title Adult Contemporary since 1996. In 1978, 17 songs topped the chart based on playlists submitted by radio stations.

In the first issue of Billboard of the year, Billy Joel reached number one with "Just the Way You Are", replacing "How Deep Is Your Love" by the Bee Gees in the top spot. Joel had launched his solo career in 1971 and achieved a number of minor chart entries over the subsequent six years, but his breakthrough to stardom did not come until the release of the album The Stranger in 1977. Taken from the album, "Just the Way You Are" won two Grammy Awards, and gave him his first Billboard number one. He would continue to be a regular on the Easy Listening/Adult Contemporary chart for more than two decades, topping the chart eight times. His 1993 song "The River of Dreams" would break a 25-year-old record by spending twelve consecutive weeks atop the listing. In contrast to Joel's lengthy and successful career was that of another act to top the chart for the first time in 1978, the band Toby Beau. Despite achieving an Easy Listening number one and reaching the top 20 of the magazine's pop chart, the Hot 100, with "My Angel Baby", the band would achieve only two more entries on either listing and their chart career would be over within two years. Similarly, jazz trumpeter Chuck Mangione topped the Easy Listening chart for the first time in 1978 with "Feels So Good" and enjoyed a brief period of both easy listening and pop chart success but this did not continue past 1980.

"Time Passages" by the Scottish singer Al Stewart was the final number one of the year. It held the top spot for the last eight weeks of 1978, the longest unbroken run atop the chart during the year. The only act to achieve more than one Easy Listening number one in 1978 was Barry Manilow; as his two chart-toppers only totalled five weeks in the top position, Stewart also had the highest total number of weeks at number one by an act during the year. Stewart had been a recording artist since the mid-1960s and would remain active for more than forty years, but his U.S. chart success was confined to a four-year period at the end of the 1970s.

== Chart history ==
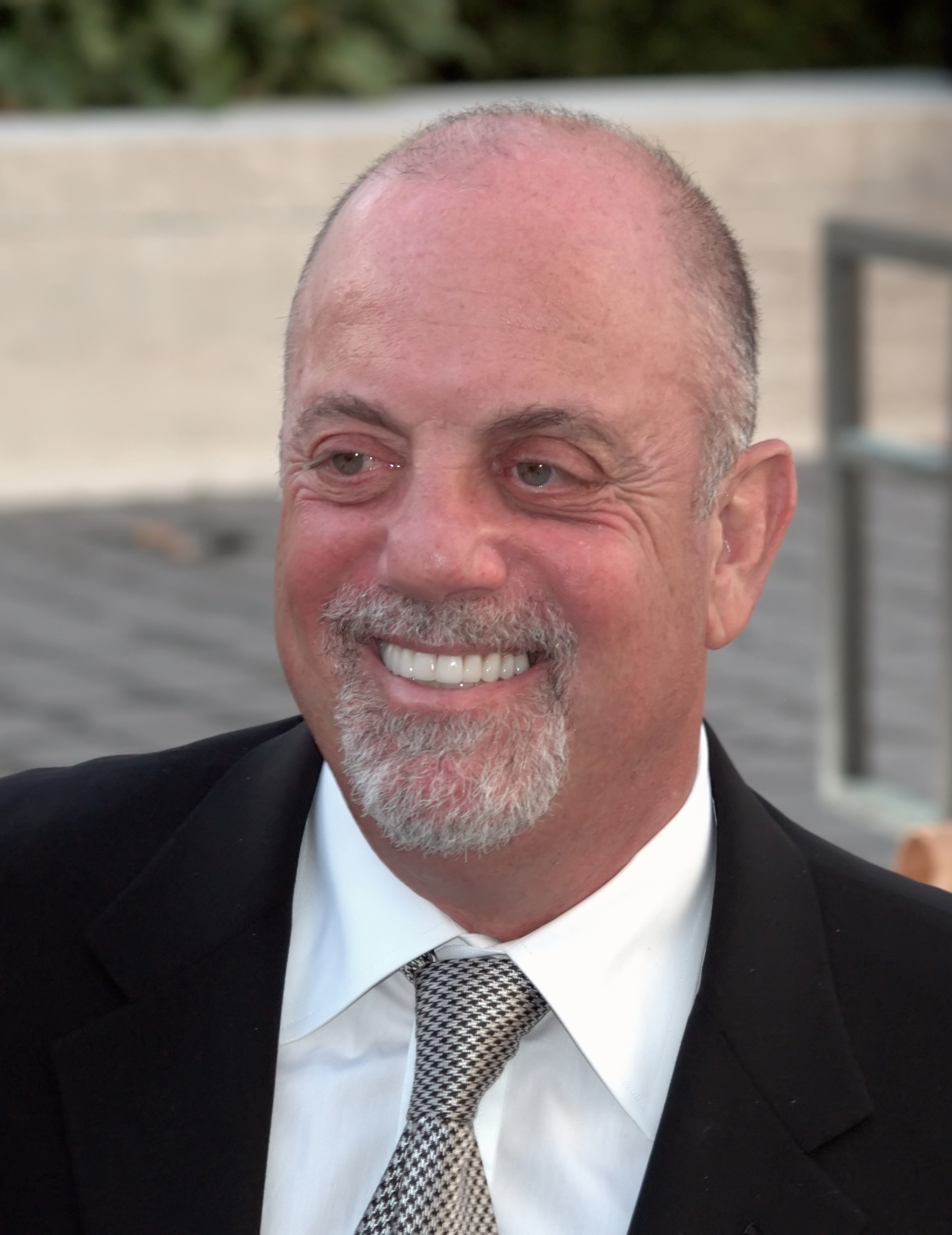
Billy Joel (pictured in 2009) achieved his first chart-topper with "Just the Way You Are". He was a regular on the chart for 25 years.

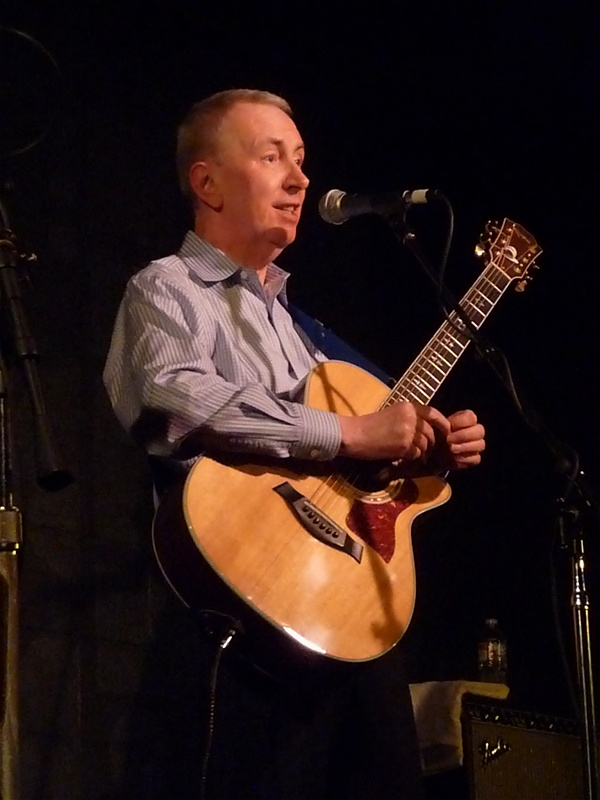
Scottish singer Al Stewart (pictured in 2010) spent the final eight weeks of 1978 at number one with "Time Passages", the longest run of the year.

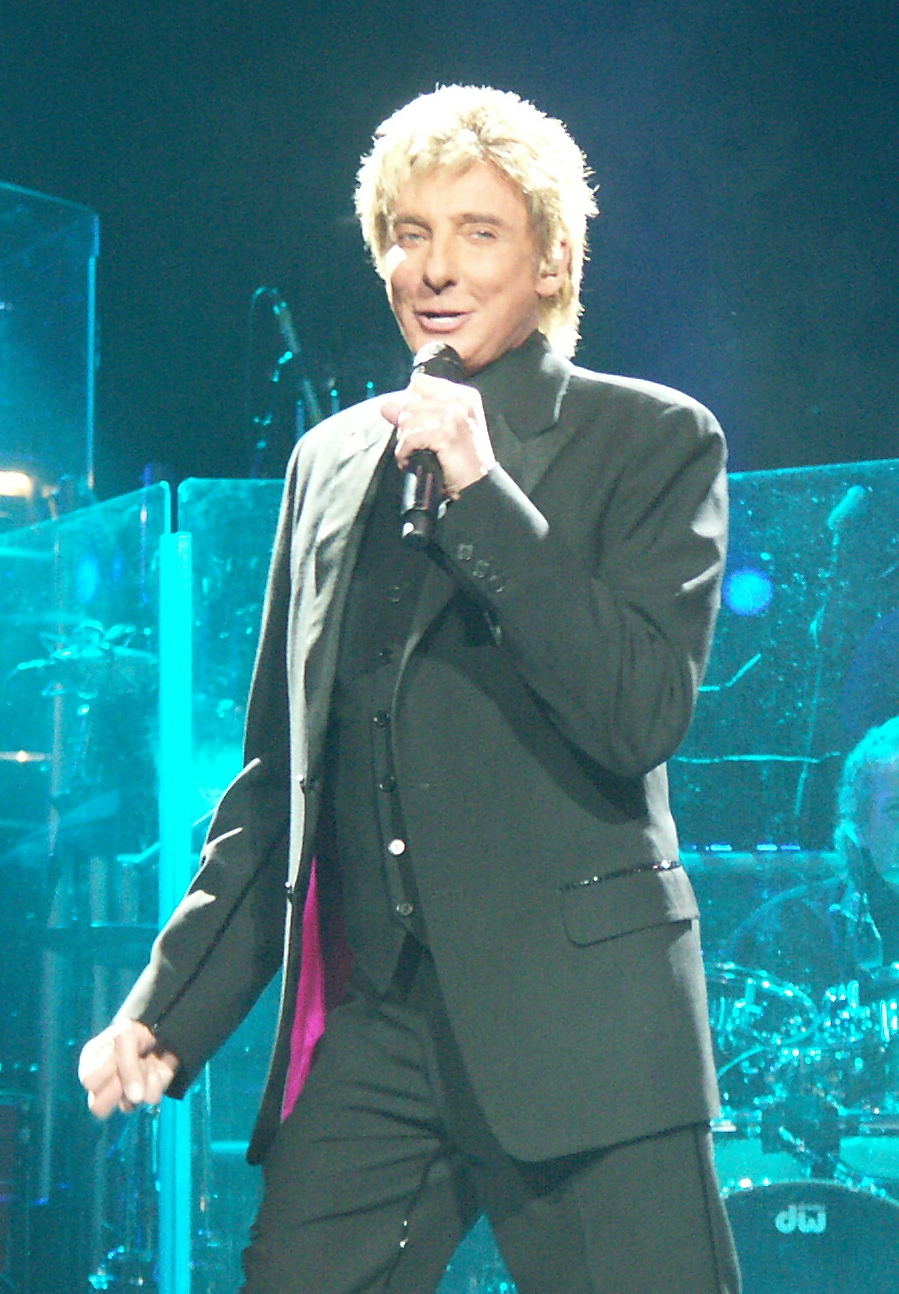
Barry Manilow (pictured in 2008) was the only act with more than one chart-topper in 1978.

Chart history
Issue date	Title	Artist(s)	Ref.
January 7	"Just the Way You Are"	Billy Joel	
January 14	"Just the Way You Are"	Billy Joel	
January 21	"Just the Way You Are"	Billy Joel	
January 28	"Just the Way You Are"	Billy Joel	
February 4	"Desiree"	Neil Diamond	
February 11	"(What A) Wonderful World"	Art Garfunkel with James Taylor and Paul Simon	
February 18	"(What A) Wonderful World"	Art Garfunkel with James Taylor and Paul Simon	
February 25	"(What A) Wonderful World"	Art Garfunkel with James Taylor and Paul Simon	
March 4	"(What A) Wonderful World"	Art Garfunkel with James Taylor and Paul Simon	
March 11	"(What A) Wonderful World"	Art Garfunkel with James Taylor and Paul Simon	
March 18	"Can't Smile Without You"	Barry Manilow	
March 25	"We'll Never Have to Say Goodbye Again"	England Dan & John Ford Coley	
April 1	"We'll Never Have to Say Goodbye Again"	England Dan & John Ford Coley	
April 8	"We'll Never Have to Say Goodbye Again"	England Dan & John Ford Coley	
April 15	"We'll Never Have to Say Goodbye Again"	England Dan & John Ford Coley	
April 22	"We'll Never Have to Say Goodbye Again"	England Dan & John Ford Coley	
April 29	"We'll Never Have to Say Goodbye Again"	England Dan & John Ford Coley	
May 6	"Can't Smile Without You"	Barry Manilow	
May 13	"Feels So Good"	Chuck Mangione	
May 20	"Too Much, Too Little, Too Late"	Johnny Mathis and Deniece Williams	
May 27	"Even Now"	Barry Manilow	
June 3	"Even Now"	Barry Manilow	
June 10	"Even Now"	Barry Manilow	
June 17	"Bluer Than Blue"	Michael Johnson	
June 24	"Bluer Than Blue"	Michael Johnson	
July 1	"Bluer Than Blue"	Michael Johnson	
July 8	"If Ever I See You Again"	Roberta Flack	
July 15	"If Ever I See You Again"	Roberta Flack	
July 22	"If Ever I See You Again"	Roberta Flack	
July 29	"Songbird"	Barbra Streisand	
August 5	"Songbird"	Barbra Streisand	
August 12	"My Angel Baby"	Toby Beau	
August 19	"Three Times a Lady"	Commodores	
August 26	"Three Times a Lady"	Commodores	
September 2	"Three Times a Lady"	Commodores	
September 9	"Fool (If You Think It's Over)"	Chris Rea	
September 16	"Fool (If You Think It's Over)"	Chris Rea	
September 23	"Fool (If You Think It's Over)"	Chris Rea	
September 30	"Right Down the Line"	Gerry Rafferty	
October 7	"Love Is in the Air"	John Paul Young	
October 14	"Love Is in the Air"	John Paul Young	
October 21	"Right Down the Line"	Gerry Rafferty	
October 28	"Right Down the Line"	Gerry Rafferty	
November 4	"Right Down the Line"	Gerry Rafferty	
November 11	"Time Passages"	Al Stewart	
November 18	"Time Passages"	Al Stewart	
November 25	"Time Passages"	Al Stewart	
December 2	"Time Passages"	Al Stewart	
December 9	"Time Passages"	Al Stewart	
December 16	"Time Passages"	Al Stewart	
December 23	"Time Passages"	Al Stewart	
December 30	"Time Passages"	Al Stewart	

== See also ==
- 1978 in music
- List of artists who reached number one on the U.S. Adult Contemporary chart
