= Dr. Heckle and Mr. Jive (England Dan & John Ford Coley album) =

Studio album by England Dan & John Ford Coley
- Released: March 1979
- Studios: Davlen Sound Studios and Larrabee Sound Studios (North Hollywood, California); The Pasha Music House (Hollywood, California); Wally Heider Studios (Los Angeles, California); Studio By The Pond (Hendersonville, Tennessee); Audio Media (Nashville, Tennessee)
- Genres: Soft rock, pop rock
- Label: Big Tree
- Producer: Kyle Lehning

England Dan & John Ford Coley chronology
Some Things Don't Come Easy (1978)	Dr. Heckle and Mr. Jive (1979)	The Best of England Dan and John Ford Coley (1980)

Singles from Dr. Heckle and Mr. Jive
- 1. "Love Is the Answer" Released: March 1979; 2. "What Can I Do with This Broken Heart" Released: September 1979

Professional ratings
Review scores
Source	Rating
AllMusic	2.5/5 stars

Dr. Heckle and Mr. Jive is the seventh and final studio album by the pop rock duo England Dan & John Ford Coley. The single "Love Is the Answer" was an American hit, reaching number ten on the Billboard Hot 100. Two other songs on the album later became country and pop hits for other artists: "Broken Hearted Me" was a success for Anne Murray in 1979, and Michael Martin Murphey scored a hit with "What's Forever For" in 1982. The duo supported the album with a North American tour.

== Track listing ==
1. "Hollywood Heckle and Jive" (John Ford Coley, Dan Seals) - 4:05
2. "What Can I Do with This Broken Heart" (John Ford Coley, Bob Gundry, Dan Seals) - 3:12
3. "Another Golden Oldie Night for Wendy" (Dennis Linde) - 3:43
4. "Broken Hearted Me" (Randy Goodrum) - 3:55
5. "Children of the Half-Light" (John Ford Coley, Bob Gundry) - 3:45
6. "Rolling Fever" (Dan Seals) - 3:24
7. "Love Is the Answer" (Todd Rundgren) - 4:41
8. "Only a Matter of Time" (John Ford Coley, Bob Gundry) - 3:16
9. "Caught Up in the Middle" (John Ford Coley, Bob Gundry) - 4:06
10. "Running After You" (Kelly Bulkin, Leslie Bulkin, John Ford Coley) - 3:07
11. "What's Forever For" (Rafe Van Hoy) - 3:25

== Charts ==
Chart (1979)	Peak position
Australia (Kent Music Report)	69
US Top LPs & Tape (Billboard)	106

== Personnel ==
- Dan Seals – lead vocals, 12 string acoustic guitar (1), backing vocals (8, 10), acoustic guitar (11)
- John Ford Coley – lead vocals, backing vocals (1, 5, 8, 10), organ (1, 5), acoustic piano (5, 8–11), acoustic guitar (11)
- Jai Winding – acoustic piano (1, 3), clavinet (3)
- Bill Payne – synthesizers (2)
- Greg Phillinganes – acoustic piano (2), electric piano (4, 7)
- Michael Boddicker – synthesizers (3)
- Steve Porcaro – synthesizers (5, 9)
- Shane Keister – electric piano (8, 11)
- Joey Carbone – electric piano (9)
- Michael Vernacchio – synthesizers (10)
- Dan Ferguson – acoustic guitar (1, 3, 5)
- Steve Gibson – 12 string electric guitar (1), electric guitar (7, 11)
- Steve Lukather – electric guitar (1, 3, 9, 11), arrangements (3), guitars (5, 7)
- Lee Ritenour – guitars (2, 7)
- Wah Wah Watson – guitars (2)
- Richie Zito – guitars (2, 4), electric guitar (8, 9, 11)
- Ovid Stevens – guitars (6), electric guitar (10)
- Gary Torps – electric guitar (6)
- Leland Sklar – bass (1, 3–5, 8, 11)
- Wilton Felder – bass (2, 7)
- John Leland – bass (6, 10)
- Dee Murray – bass (9)
- Jeff Porcaro – drums (1, 4)
- Ed Greene – drums (2, 7)
- Gary Mallaber – drums (3, 9)
- Ralph Humphrey – drums (5, 8, 11)
- Danny Gorman – drums (6, 10)
- Steve Forman – percussion (2, 7, 9)
- Bubba Keith – harmonica
- Ernie Watts – soprano saxophone (7), tenor saxophone (9), baritone saxophone (10)
- Gene Page – arrangements (2, 7), string arrangements (4)
- Bergen White – string arrangements (8)
- Kelly Bulkin – backing vocals (1, 5, 8, 10)
- Leslie Bulkin – backing vocals (1, 5, 8, 10)
- The Jim Gilstrap Singers – choir (7)

=== Production ===
- Producer – Kyle Lehning
- Engineers – Kyle Lehning, Marshall Morgan and Bobby Schaper.
- Assistant Engineers – Chris Desmond, Sherry Klein, James Simick and Patrick Von Wiegandt.
- Recorded at Davlen Sound Studios (North Hollywood, CA).
- Overdubbed at The Pasha Music House and Larrabee Sound Studios (Hollywood, CA); Wally Heider Studios (Los Angeles, CA); Studio By The Pond (Hendersonville, TN); Audio Media (Nashville, TN).
- Tracks 1–3 & 7 mixed by Bill Schnee at Cherokee Studios (Los Angeles, CA), assisted by John Weaver.
- Tracks 4–6 & 8–11 mixed by Elliot Scheiner at A&R Studios (New York, NY), assisted by K.C. Green.
- Mastered by Mike Reese at The Mastering Lab (Hollywood, CA).
- Design and Photography – Norman Seeff
- Illustration – Jim Evans
