= Broken Hearted Me =

1979 song written by Randy Goodrum

Song by England Dan & John Ford Coley

from the album Dr. Heckle and Mr. Jive
- Released: March 1979
- Genre: Soft rock
- Length: 3:55
- Label: Big Tree
- Songwriter: Randy Goodrum
- Producer: Kyle Lehning

"Broken Hearted Me"

Single by Anne Murray

from the album I'll Always Love You
- B-side: "Why Don't You Stick Around"
- Released: September 1979
- Recorded: 1979
- Genre: Country
- Length: 3:43
- Label: Capitol
- Songwriter: Randy Goodrum
- Producer: Jim Ed Norman

Anne Murray singles chronology
"Shadows in the Moonlight" (1979)	"Broken Hearted Me" (1979)	"Daydream Believer" (1979)

"Broken Hearted Me" is a song written by Randy Goodrum, originally recorded by England Dan & John Ford Coley for their album Dr. Heckle and Mr. Jive, and later covered by Canadian country and pop music singer Anne Murray. It was released in September 1979 as the first single from her album I'll Always Love You. The song reached No. 1 on the Billboard Hot Country Singles chart in December, Murray's fourth No. 1 single on that chart. She also recorded a version of the song in Spanish, which was released on vinyl, and later on CD.

In addition, "Broken Hearted Me" just missed the top 10 on the Hot 100 chart, where it peaked at No. 12. Three of her other singles — "A Love Song", "I Just Fall in Love Again" and "Daydream Believer" — also reached the same summit on the Hot 100. On the Billboard Adult Contemporary singles chart, "Broken Hearted Me" spent five weeks at No. 1 during the late fall of 1979. In doing so, Murray had gained her fifth No. 1 AC hit.

In her home country, the song reached No. 15 on the Canadian pop chart, No. 1 on the Adult Contemporary chart, and it became Murray's twelfth No. 1 song on the Canadian Country chart.

== Chart performance ==
=== Weekly charts ===
Chart (1979–1980)	Peak position
Canada Country Singles (RPM)	1
Canada Adult Contemporary (RPM)	1
Canada Top Singles (RPM)	15
US Hot Country Singles (Billboard)	1
US Adult Contemporary (Billboard)	1
US Billboard Hot 100	12

=== Year-end charts ===
Chart (1980)	Position
Canada	125
US Billboard Hot 100	92
US Adult Contemporary (Billboard)	4
US Hot Country Songs (Billboard)	36
