= I Just Can't Say No to You =

1976 song by Parker McGee

Single by Parker McGee

from the album Parker McGee
- B-side: "Talk About Lovin' You"
- Released: 1976
- Genre: Soft rock
- Length: 3:06
- Label: Big Tree Records
- Songwriter(s): Parker McGee, Steve Gibson
- Producer(s): Kyle Lehning

Parker McGee singles chronology
"Boy Meets Girl" (1976)	"I Just Can't Say No to You" (1976)	"This Magic Night" (1976)

"I Just Can't Say No to You" is a song by American singer-songwriter Parker McGee. It was released as a single in 1976 from his sole self-titled album.

The song narrowly missed the top 40 of the Billboard Hot 100, peaking at number 42. However, it was a top 10 hit on the Adult Contemporary chart, peaking at number 7.

== Cover versions ==
"I Just Can't Say No to You" has been covered by the following:

- Jackie DeShannon from the 1977 album You're the Only Dancer.
- Michael Johnson as the B-side to "This Night Won't Last Forever", and from the 1979 album Dialogue.
- Margo Smith from the 1980 album Diamonds & Chills.
- Moe Bandy as a single which reached No. 21 on the Country chart, from the 1988 album No Regrets.

== Chart performance ==
Chart (1976)	Peak position
U.S. Billboard Hot 100	42
U.S. Billboard Adult Contemporary	7
