= Nights Are Forever =

Studio album by England Dan & John Ford Coley
- Released: July 1976
- Recorded: 1976
- Studios: Studio By The Pond (Hendersonville, TN)
- Genres: Pop rock, soft rock, country
- Label: Big Tree
- Producer: Kyle Lehning

England Dan & John Ford Coley chronology
I Hear Music (1976)	Nights Are Forever (1976)	Dowdy Ferry Road (1977)

Singles from Nights Are Forever
- 1. "I'd Really Love to See You Tonight" Released: May 1976; 2. "Nights Are Forever Without You" Released: October 1976

Professional ratings
Review scores
Source	Rating
AllMusic	4.5/5 stars
The Encyclopedia of Popular Music	2/5 stars
The Rolling Stone Album Guide	1/5 stars

Nights Are Forever is the fourth studio album by the American duo England Dan & John Ford Coley. It was the pair's breakthrough album. "I'd Really Love to See You Tonight" became one of their biggest hits, peaking at #2 on the Billboard Hot 100. The follow-up single, "Nights Are Forever Without You," also proved successful, peaking at #10.

== Production ==
The album was produced by Kyle Lehning. Both top ten singles were written by Parker McGee.

== Critical reception ==
Joe Viglione wrote on Allmusic, "Nights Are Forever was the breakthrough album for Dan Seals and John Coley after some sincere and excellent work on A&M Records in the early '70s. Two of their biggest hits were the title track and the beautiful 'I'd Really Love to See You Tonight.' Those songs are a good indication of the fine performances this 1976 album contains. The duo's originals like 'Long Way Home' and the Dan Fogelberg-ish 'Westward Wind' could have been hits as well displaying superb musicianship and delicate vocals." He also praises the work of songwriter Parker McGee as well as producer Kyle Lehning.

The Rolling Stone Album Guide wrote that "these guys managed always to sound like oafish bores breaking their backs to be 'sensitive.'"

== Track listing ==
1. "I'd Really Love to See You Tonight" (Parker McGee) - 2:39
2. "I'll Stay" (Dan Seals) - 3:20
3. "Westward Wind" (Seals, Coley) - 3:17
4. "Long Way Home" (Seals, Coley) - 3:18
5. "There'll Never Be Another For Me" (Seals, McGee, Coley) - 2:50
6. "Nights Are Forever Without You" (McGee) - 2:52
7. "It's Not The Same" (Seals, Coley, Sunny Dalton) - 2:38
8. "Showboat Gambler" (Seals) - 2:37
9. "The Prisoner" (Seals, Coley) - 3:35
10. "Lady" (Seals, McGee, Coley, Kyle Lehning) - 3:58
11. "Everything's Gonna Be Alright" (Seals, Coley) - 3:08

== Personnel ==
- Dan Seals – lead vocals, acoustic guitar, soprano saxophone
- John Ford Coley – lead vocals, acoustic guitar, keyboards
- Steve Gibson – acoustic guitar, electric guitar, mandolin
- Jim Seals – acoustic guitar, banjo
- Bobby Thompson – acoustic guitar
- Doyle Grisham – steel guitar
- Shane Keister – keyboards
- Kyle Lehning – bass
- Joe Osborn – bass
- Ted Reynolds – bass
- Larrie Londin – drums, percussion
- Dennis Good – trombone
- George Cunningham – trumpet
- Don Sheffield – trumpet
- Billy Puett – woodwinds
- Denis Solee – woodwinds
- Warren Hartman – string arrangements (1, 7)
- Bergen White – horn and string arrangements (4, 5, 6, 11)
- The Shelly Kurland String Section – strings
- Janie Fricke – backing vocals
- Ginger Holiday – backing vocals
- Sheri Kramer – backing vocals
- Lisa Silver – backing vocals
- Diane Tidwell – backing vocals

=== Production ===
- Producer and Engineer – Kyle Lehning
- Sound Consultant – Jon Yeaworth
- Recorded and Mixed at Studio By The Pond (Hendersonville, TN).
- Mastered by Mac Evans and Glenn Meadows at Masterfonics (Nashville, TN).
- Photography – Slick Lawson

== Charts ==
=== Album ===
Chart (1976–77)	Peak position
Australian (Kent Music Report)	68
Canada Top Albums/CDs (RPM)	11
US Billboard 200	17

=== Singles ===
Year	US Billboard	US Cash Box	US Record World	US AC	CAN	CAN AC	UK	Title
1976	2	4	5	1	10	1	26	"I'd Really Love to See You Tonight"
1976–77	10	10	9	6	10	4	-	"Nights Are Forever without You"
