= I Hear Music (England Dan & John Ford Coley album) =

I Hear The Music

Compilation album by England Dan & John Ford Coley
- Released: 1976
- Label: A&M
- Producer: Louie Shelton

England Dan & John Ford Coley chronology
Fables (1971)	I Hear The Music (1976)	Nights Are Forever (1976)

I Hear The Music is the third studio album and a compilation of songs by American pop rock duo England Dan & John Ford Coley, released by A&M Records several years after the various A&M recording sessions. Four songs, "Tell Her Hello", "New Jersey", "Mud and Stone" and "Miss Me", had already been released on the 1970 album England Dan & John Ford Coley. The other songs were recorded around 1970–72 for the album Fables (1971) or other shelved projects. After showing only minor success in the US with "New Jersey" (number 102) and better results in Japan with "Simone" (number 1), the duo was cut from the A&M roster in 1972. A&M kept testing the market, though, releasing "I Hear the Music" as a promotional single in September 1973. England Dan & John Ford Coley were left without a record company for a few years, but they participated in various projects including two Seals & Crofts albums.

After the duo's huge 1976 hit single "I'd Really Love to See You Tonight", released through Big Tree Records, A&M capitalized on the market success by releasing an album of tracks recorded years earlier. The UK version of the album includes "Simone" as an extra track.

== Track listing ==
All songs written by England Dan and John Ford Coley.

Side One

1. "Used To You" - 2:58
2. "Tell Her Hello" - 3:14
3. "New Jersey" - 3:01
4. "Idolizer" - 3:07
5. "Mud and Stone" - 2:47

Side Two

1. "I Hear the Music" - 3:14
2. "Legendary Captain" - 3:36
3. "Miss Me" - 3:07
4. "The Pilot" - 2:36
5. "Carry On" - 3:18

== Personnel ==
- Vocals – Dan Seals, John Ford Coley
- Guitars – Dan Seals, John Ford Coley, Louie Shelton
- Sitar – Louie Shelton
- Keyboards – Clarence McDonald, John Ford Coley, David Paich
- Bass – Joe Osborn, Max Bennett, David Hungate, Louie Shelton
- Drums – Jeff Porcaro, Jim Gordon, Ronnie Tutt
- Percussion – Mark Stevens, Alan Estes
- Harmonica – Tommy Morgan

=== Production ===
- Producer – Louie Shelton
- Engineers – Joseph Bogan, Larry Forkner, Ray Gerhardt, Dave Hassinger, Henry Lewy and Rick Porter.
- Mastered by Frank DeLuna at A&M Mastering Studios (Hollywood, CA).
- Art Direction – Roland Young
- Design – Junie Osaki
- Photography – Ruan O’Lochlainn
