= Dowdy Ferry Road =

Studio album by England Dan & John Ford Coley
- Released: March 1977
- Studio: Hazen’s Recording Studio (Hendersonville, TN)
- Genre: Pop rock, soft rock
- Label: Big Tree
- Producer: Kyle Lehning

England Dan & John Ford Coley chronology
Nights Are Forever (1976)	Dowdy Ferry Road (1977)	Some Things Don't Come Easy (1978)

Singles from Dowdy Ferry Road
- 1. "It's Sad to Belong" Released: April 1977; 2. "Where Do I Go from Here" Released: 1977; 3. "Gone Too Far" Released: 1977

Dowdy Ferry Road is the fifth studio album by the pop rock duo England Dan & John Ford Coley. The album's single "It's Sad to Belong" was a moderate pop hit and a #1 smash on the Adult Contemporary chart. A second hit from the LP, "Gone Too Far," reached #23 on the U.S. Billboard Hot 100. Being from the Dallas, Texas area, England Dan and John Ford Coley named "Dowdy Ferry Road" after a street in the southeastern part of town. Dowdy Ferry (Exit #476) connects with Interstate 20 in Texas.

== Critical reception ==
Professional ratings
Review scores
Source	Rating
AllMusic	3/5 stars

Cash Box said of the single "Gone Too Far" that "Coley's melody and lyric work perfectly with the slick harmonies and tasteful instrumentation."

== Track listing ==
1. "Dowdy Ferry Road" (Dan Seals) – 3:23
2. "It's Sad to Belong" (Randy Goodrum) – 2:54
3. "Soldier in the Rain" (John Ford Coley, Sunny Dalton) – 4:45
4. "Love is the One Thing We Hide" (Seals) – 2:53
5. "Gone Too Far" (Coley) – 2:58
6. "Where Do I Go From Here" (Parker McGee) – 2:59
7. "Falling Stars" (Coley) – 2:56
8. "You Know We Belong Together" (Coley, Seals) – 3:01
9. "Don't Feel That Way No More" (Seals) – 3:07
10. "Holocaust" (Seals) – 3:09

== Personnel ==
- John Ford Coley – acoustic guitar, keyboards, lead and backing vocals,
- England Dan Seals – acoustic guitar, lead and backing vocals
- Steve Gibson – acoustic guitar, electric guitar
- Bobby Thompson – acoustic guitar
- Doyle Grisham – steel guitar
- Shane Keister – keyboards, Moog synthesizer
- Kyle Lehning – keyboards
- Joe Osborn – bass
- Larrie Londin – drums, percussion
- Dennis Good – trombone
- George Tidwell – trumpet
- Billy Puett – woodwinds
- Buddy Skipper – woodwinds, horn arrangements (1), woodwind arrangements (6, 8)
- Bergen White – string arrangements, woodwind arrangements (4, 10)
- The Shelly Kurland String Section – strings
- Sheri Kramer – backing vocals
- Lisa Silver – backing vocals
- Wendy Suits – backing vocals
- Diane Tidwell – backing vocals

=== Production ===
- Producer – Kyle Lehning
- Engineers – Kyle Lehning and Marshall Morgan
- Recorded and Mixed at Hazen’s Recording Studio (Hendersonville, TN).
- Mastered by Glenn Meadows at Masterfonics (Nashville, TN).
- Art Direction – Bob Defrin
- Photography – Jim Houghton and Earl Steinbecker
