= Some Things Don't Come Easy =

Studio album by England Dan & John Ford Coley
- Released: March 1978
- Studio: Studio By The Pond (Hendersonville, TN)
- Genre: Pop rock, soft rock
- Label: Big Tree
- Producer: Kyle Lehning

England Dan & John Ford Coley chronology
| Dowdy Ferry Road (1977) | Some Things Don't Come Easy (1978) | Dr. Heckle and Mr. Jive (1979) |

Singles from Some Things Don't Come Easy
- 1. "We'll Never Have to Say Goodbye Again" Released: February 17, 1978

Professional ratings
Review scores
| Source | Rating |
|---|---|
| Allmusic | 2/5 stars |

Some Things Don't Come Easy is the sixth studio album by the pop rock duo England Dan & John Ford Coley.

== Track listing ==
1. "Some Things Don't Come Easy" (Dan Seals) - 4:22
2. "If The World Ran Out Of Love Tonight" (Michael Garvin, Blake Mevis, Admiral S. Clay Wilson, Kelly Wilson) - 3:03
3. "You Can't Dance" (Tim Ryan, Bob Yeomans) - 2:56
4. "Who's Lonely Now" (John Ford Coley, Seals) - 3:19
5. "Hold Me" (Coley, Bob Gundry, Simon Waltzer) - 3:32
6. "We'll Never Have to Say Goodbye Again" (Jeffrey Comanor) - 2:49
7. "Lovin' Somebody on a Rainy Night" (Dave Loggins) - 3:24
8. "Beyond the Tears" (Comanor, Gundry) - 3:45
9. "Calling For You Again" (Coley, Gundry) - 2:44
10. "Wanting You Desperately" (Seals) - 3:55
11. "Just the Two of Us" (Coley, Seals) - 2:20

== Personnel ==
- Dan Seals – lead vocals, backing vocals, acoustic guitar, electric guitar
- John Ford Coley – lead vocals, backing vocals, keyboards, acoustic guitar
- Shane Keister – keyboards
- Bobby Emmons – organ
- Johnny Christopher – acoustic guitar
- Steve Gibson – acoustic guitar, electric guitar
- Bobby Thompson – acoustic guitar
- Doyle Grisham – steel guitar
- Joe Osborn – bass
- Jack Williams – bass
- Larrie Londin – drums
- Farrell Morris – percussion
- Gove Scrivenor – autoharp
- Cindy Reynolds – harp
- Harvey Thompson – saxophone solo
- Muscle Shoals Horns – horns
- Billy Puett – woodwinds
- Bergen White – string arrangements
- The Shelly Kurland Strings – strings
- Sheri Kramer – backing vocals
- Lisa Silver – backing vocals
- Diane Tidwell – backing vocals
- Vicki Lehning – backing vocals (11)

=== Production ===
- Producer – Kyle Lehning
- Engineers – Kyle Lehning and Marshall Morgan
- Assistant Engineer – Tom Knox
- Recorded at Studio By The Pond (Hendersonville, TN).
- Mixed by Elliot Scheiner at A&R Studios (New York, NY), assisted by Ed Rak.
- Mastered by Glenn Meadows at Masterfonics (Nashville, TN).
- Photography – Alan Bergman
- Management – Susan Joseph

== Charts ==
| Year | Chart | Position |
|---|---|---|
| 1978 | US Billboard Top LPs & Tape | 61 |
