= The Best of England Dan and John Ford Coley Vol. 2 =

The Best of England Dan & John Ford Coley Vol. 2

Greatest hits album by England Dan & John Ford Coley
- Released: 1981
- Genre: Pop rock; soft rock
- Label: Big Tree

England Dan & John Ford Coley chronology
Just Tell Me You Love Me (1980)	The Best of England Dan & John Ford Coley Vol. 2 (1981)	The Very Best of England Dan & John Ford Coley (1996)

The Best of England Dan & John Ford Coley Vol. 2 is a greatest hits album by the pop rock duo England Dan & John Ford Coley.

== Track listing ==
1. "What's Forever For"
2. "You Could've Been the One"
3. "I'll Stay"
4. "Stones (Dig a Little Deeper)"
5. "If the World Ran Out of Love"
6. "Wanting You Desperately"
7. "Some Things Don't Come Easy"
8. "Broken Hearted Me"
9. "Rolling Fever"
10. "The Prisoner"
11. "Where Do I Go from Here"
12. "Lovin' Somebody on a Rainy Night"
