= Nights Are Forever Without You =

- Big Tree Records 1976 single cover

Single by England Dan & John Ford Coley

from the album Nights Are Forever
- B-side: "Showboat Gambler"
- Released: October 1976
- Genre: Soft rock
- Length: 2:52
- Label: Big Tree (US); Atlantic (UK)
- Songwriter: Parker McGee
- Producer: Kyle Lehning

England Dan & John Ford Coley singles chronology
"I'd Really Love to See You Tonight" (1976)	"Nights Are Forever Without You" (1976)	"It's Sad to Belong" (1977)

"Nights Are Forever Without You" is a song written by Parker McGee and first recorded by the soft rock duo England Dan & John Ford Coley. It was released as the second single from their 1976 album Nights Are Forever, following up on their top 10 hit "I'd Really Love to See You Tonight".

== Music and lyrics ==
Billboard contributor Paul Grein described "Nights Are Forever Without You" as a "twanging country number." Missoulian contributor Sherry Jones described it as a "sentimental ballad of love and loss." Los Angeles Times critic Dennis Hunt described it as a "soft rock [ballad] with lush harmonies." Cash Box said that "an excellent arrangement complements ace harmonies from this winning duo." Record World called it "an extraordinary piece of pop in all its splendor" with "great chording and syncopation."

== Reception ==
Kingston Daily Freeman critic Alan Forray suggested that "Nights Are Forever Without You" would become a blockbuster like "I'd Really Love to See You Tonight" and, ignoring some earlier unsuccessful recordings suggested that "never in pop history has a brand new recording act had their first two singles on the top 40 charts at the same time." Los Angeles Times critic Terry Atkinson rated "Nights Are Forever Without You" as one of the two best songs on Nights Are Forever, along with "I'd Really Love to See You Tonight." The Leader-Post critic Gary Deane described it as an exception to the blandness of most of the Nights Are Forever album.

The song peaked at No. 10 on the U.S. Billboard Hot 100 chart for two weeks and number six on the Easy Listening chart. It charted very similarly in Canada. England Dan's brother Jim Seals had a top 10 song at the same time with "Get Closer." Along with "I'd Really Love to See You Tonight", "Nights Are Forever Without You" brought England Dan and John Ford Coley into national prominence after more than a decade of singing together. The duo claimed that the success of this song made them feel more secure after the overnight success of its predecessor.

England Dan and John Ford Coley performed "Nights Are Forever Without You" on The Captain and Tennille TV show on January 24, 1977.

"Nights Are Forever Without You" has been included on several of England Dan and John Ford Coley's compilation albums including 1979's The Best of England Dan and John Ford Coley. Ottawa Citizen critic Bill Provick called it a "highlight" of The Best of England Dan and John Ford Coley, being "easy on the ears without being hard on the stomach." Dan Seals (England Dan) later recorded his solo version on the 1998 album In a Quiet Room II, and Coley recorded his version on his 2008 self-titled live EP.

== Chart history ==
=== Weekly charts ===
Chart (1976–77)	Peak position
Canada RPM Top Singles	10
Canada RPM Adult Contemporary	4
US Billboard Hot 100	10
US Billboard Easy Listening	6
US Cash Box Top 100	10
US Record World	9

=== Year-end charts ===
Chart (1976)	Rank
Canada	109

== Cover versions ==
- Bob James produced an instrumental jazz cover on his 1977 album BJ4.
- Buck Owens covered "Nights Are Forever Without You" in 1978. His version reached No. 27 on the Billboard Hot Country Songs chart. AllMusic critic Stephen Thomas Erlewine described the performance as sounding "disinterested."
