= You're the Only Dancer =

Studio album by Jackie DeShannon
- Released: 1977
- Genre: Pop
- Label: Amherst
- Producer: Jim Ed Norman

Jackie DeShannon chronology
New Arrangement (1975)	You're the Only Dancer (1977)	Quick Touches (1978)

You're the Only Dancer is an LP album by Jackie DeShannon, released by Amherst Records as catalog number AMH-1010 in 1977.

== Track listing ==
Track	Song	Writer(s)	Time
1	"Don't Let the Flame Burn Out"	Jackie DeShannon	3:34
2	"I Just Can't Say No to You"	Parker McGee, Steve Gibson	2:48
3	"Just to Feel This Love from You"	DeShannon, Dean MacDougall	3:13
4	"I Don't Think I Can Wait"	DeShannon	3:25
5	"To Love Somebody"	Barry Gibb, Robin Gibb	3:13
6	"You're the Only Dancer"	DeShannon	3:55
7	"Try to Win a Friend"	Larry Gatlin	3:33
8	"Dorothy"	Hugh Prestwood	3:56
9	"Your Love Has Got a Hold on Me"	DeShannon, Dean MacDougall	2:39
10	"Tonight You're Doin' It Right"	DeShannon	3:12

== Personnel ==
- Ben Benay - harmonica, acoustic guitar
- Ken Benay - guitar
- Michael Bowden - bass
- Buzz Buchanan - drums, percussion
- Randy Edelman - piano, backing vocals
- James Gadson - drums
- Jay Graydon - guitar
- John Leslie Hug - electric guitar
- David Hungate - bass
- Tricia Johns - backing vocals
- Kevin Kelly - organ
- Rick Littlefield - acoustic guitar
- J. D. Maness - steel guitar
- Charles Merriam - backing vocals
- Randy Mitchell - guitar
- Art Munson - guitar
- Jim Ed Norman - piano, electric piano
- David Paich - piano
- David Shields - bass
- Kathryn Ward - backing vocals
- John Ware - drums
- Brian Whitcomb - piano
