= Love Is the Answer (Utopia song) =

1977 single by Utopia

- US single A-side

Single by England Dan & John Ford Coley

from the album Dr. Heckle and Mr. Jive
- B-side: "Running After You"
- Released: March 1979
- Genre: Soft rock
- Length: 4:42
- Label: Big Tree
- Songwriter: Todd Rundgren
- Producer: Kyle Lehning

England Dan & John Ford Coley singles chronology
"Westward Wind" (1978)	"Love Is the Answer" (1979)	"What Can I Do with This Broken Heart" (1979)

"Love Is the Answer" is a song written by Todd Rundgren and performed with his band Utopia. It is the closing track on their 1977 album Oops! Wrong Planet, and was the only single released from the album.

== England Dan & John Ford Coley version ==
In 1979, American soft rock duo England Dan & John Ford Coley released their version as the lead single from their seventh studio album Dr. Heckle and Mr. Jive. It reached number 10 on the Billboard Hot 100 chart in May 1979 and spent two weeks atop the Billboard Adult Contemporary chart. John Ford Coley was quoted as saying: "Of all the songs we released as singles, that was my favorite. The song first of all had a classical base, and the middle had a gospel section which I loved."

Dan Seals, the "England Dan" half of the duo, re-recorded the song in 1995 in an acoustic country version for the album In a Quiet Room. Coley recorded his version on his 2008 self-titled live EP.

=== Personnel ===
- Dan Seals – lead vocals
- John Ford Coley – lead vocals
- Greg Phillinganes – electric piano
- Steve Gibson – electric guitar
- Steve Lukather – guitars
- Lee Ritenour – guitars
- Wilton Felder – bass
- Ed Greene – drums
- Steve Forman – percussion
- Ernie Watts – soprano saxophone
- Gene Page – arrangements
- The Jim Gilstrap Singers – choir

=== Weekly charts ===
Chart (1979)	Rank
Canada Top Singles (RPM)	33
Canada Adult Contemporary (RPM)	18
UK Singles (OCC)	45
US Billboard Hot 100	10
US Adult Contemporary (Billboard)	1

== Other versions ==
The song has been covered several times by Christian and mainstream artists.

- Keni Burke covered it on his 1981 album You're The Best on RCA Victor Records
- Sheila Walsh recorded it in 1988 for her album Say So, and performed it on her very first The 700 Club appearance as co-hostess.
- Bill Cantos and Justo Almario covered it in 1995 for the album Who Are You.
- Cindy Morgan covered it in 2000 for her greatest hits album, The Best So Far.
- Bob Carlisle and Bryan Duncan recorded a gospel blues version in 2001.
- Filipino singer Gary Valenciano covered the song on his 2001 album, Revive.
- In 2004, it was the title track of Glen Campbell's album Love Is the Answer: 24 Songs of Faith, Hope and Love.
- A cover of this song is a bonus track on the Limited Edition CD of Rick Springfield's The Day After Yesterday (2005).
- British singer Rumer released in 2015 an EP named "Love is the answer" with a cover in it.
- Foxes and Fossils covered the song in 2020.

== See also ==
- List of Billboard Adult Contemporary number ones of 1979
