= I'll Always Love You (album) =

Studio album by Anne Murray
- Released: October 1979
- Studios: Eastern Sound (Toronto, Ontario, Canada)
- Genre: Country
- Length: 31:42
- Label: Capitol
- Producer: Jim Ed Norman

Anne Murray chronology
New Kind of Feeling (1979)	I'll Always Love You (1979)	Somebody's Waiting (1980)

Singles from I'll Always Love You
- 1. "Broken Hearted Me" Released: September 1979; 2. "Daydream Believer" Released: December 1979

Professional ratings
Review scores
Source	Rating
AllMusic	3/5 stars
Christgau's Record Guide	B−

I'll Always Love You is the sixteenth studio album by Canadian country pop artist Anne Murray, released in 1979 via Capitol Records. In the U.S. the album reached #4 on the Billboard Country albums chart and number 24 on the Billboard Pop Albums chart. It achieved American sales of approximately 900,000 copies. It was certified Gold by the Recording Industry Association of America RIAA.

The disc contains Murray's fourth #1 Country hit "Broken Hearted Me". It also contains her revival of The Monkees' 1967 #1 hit "Daydream Believer" which peaked at number 12 on the Billboard Hot 100 chart. The album also contained compositions by Dave Loggins, Rory Bourke, Charlie Black and Jesse Winchester.

The photo on the album cover depicts Murray, seated alone in a restaurant after what appears to be a broken engagement. Murray, who was then pregnant with her daughter Dawn Langstroth, is seated at a table so that her pregnancy is not visible in the photo.

== Track listing ==
No.	Title	Writer(s)	Length
1.	"You've Got Me to Hold On To"	Dave Loggins	2:53
2.	"I'll Always Love You"	Eric Kaz, Tom Snow	3:29
3.	"Stranger At My Door"	Kerry Chater, Rory Bourke, Charlie Black	2:54
4.	"Good Old Song"	Ron Davies, Mentor Williams	2:32
5.	"Why Don't You Stick Around"	Aidan Mason, Gordon Adams	3:13
6.	"Broken Hearted Me"	Randy Goodrum	3:43
7.	"Easy Love"	Kerry Chater	2:53
8.	"Daydream Believer"	John Stewart	2:26
9.	"Wintery Feeling"	Jesse Winchester	4:00
10.	"Lovers Knot"	Richard Supa	3:19

== Personnel ==
- Anne Murray – all vocals
- Brian Gatto – keyboards
- Pat Riccio Jr. – keyboards
- Doug Riley – acoustic piano (6)
- Bob Mann – guitars
- Aidan Mason – guitars
- Brian Russell – guitars
- Bob Lucier – steel guitar, dobro
- Peter Cardinali – bass (1–5, 7–10), horn and string arrangements (3–5, 7–9)
- Tom Szczesniak – bass (6)
- Jørn Andersen – drums (1–5, 7–10), percussion
- Barry Keane – drums (6)
- Rick Wilkins – horn and string arrangements (1, 2, 6)

=== Production ===
- Balmur Ltd. – executive producers
- Jim Ed Norman – producer
- Ken Friesen – engineer
- Peter Holcomb – assistant engineer
- Paul Cade – art direction, design
- Gord Marci – photography
- Typsetta, Inc. – typography

== Charts ==
=== Weekly charts ===
Chart (1979)	Peak position
Australia Albums (Kent Music Report)	86
Canadian Albums (RPM)	18
Canadian Country Albums (RPM)	1
US Billboard 200	24
US Top Country Albums (Billboard)	4

=== Year-end charts ===
Chart (1980)	Position
US Top Country Albums (Billboard)	26
