= It's Sad to Belong =

Single by England Dan & John Ford Coley

from the album Dowdy Ferry Road
- B-side: "The Time Has Come"
- Released: April 1977
- Recorded: 1976
- Genre: Country rock; soft rock
- Length: 2:54
- Label: Big Tree Records
- Songwriter: Randy Goodrum
- Producer: Kyle Lehning

England Dan & John Ford Coley singles chronology
"Nights Are Forever Without You" (1976)	"It's Sad to Belong" (1977)	"Gone Too Far" (1977)

Audio
- "It's Sad to Belong" on YouTube

"It's Sad to Belong" is a song written by Randy Goodrum and performed by England Dan & John Ford Coley on their 1977 album, Dowdy Ferry Road. Called a "timeless classic", it peaked at No. 21 on the Billboard Hot 100 chart and No. 1 on the Easy Listening chart. It was one of the earlier pop hits in Goodrum's career.

"It's Sad to Belong" was released in May 1977 through Big Tree Records, with the B-side "The Time Has Come". It became one of "a string of hit singles" that England Dan & John Ford Coley had in the mid-1970s.

The song topped the Adult Contemporary (then called "Easy Listening") chart for five consecutive weeks from June 25 to July 23. It also appeared on the top 40 "rack singles" list on June 7. On December 24, it ranked No. 3 on Billboard's end-of-the-year easy listening chart.

== Background ==
"It's Sad to Belong" is the second track on Dowdy Ferry Road. It is one of only two songs on the album not written by either singer.

The song has been called "bittersweet", telling the story of a married man falling in love with another woman and knowing they cannot be together. Dale Van Atta of the Deseret News observed that it is "the universal divorce anthem - about the alleged monotony of monogamy" and that the duo "[reduces] it to a simple, peaceful chorus" (referring to the line, Yes, it's sad to belong to someone else when the right one comes along).

Billboard described the song as a "sweetly catchy ballad." Cash Box said "The strong point is their seamless harmony, easing a catchy chorus through several refrains." Record World said that "the latest single by this duo deals with the 'trying to love two' theme in a way that should find listeners in pop, MOR and country formats in short order."

It is still performed in concerts by the surviving member of the duo, John Ford Coley.

== Chart performance ==
=== Weekly charts ===
Chart (1977)	Peak position
Canada Adult Contemporary (RPM)	1
Canada Top Singles (RPM)	9
US Billboard Hot 100	21
US Adult Contemporary (Billboard)	1
US Cash Box Top 100	13

=== Year-end charts ===
Chart (1977)	Rank
Canada Top Singles	91
US Cash Box	82
US Adult Contemporary (Billboard)	3

== Other versions ==
B.J. Thomas recorded a version of "It's Sad to Belong" in 1977 on his eponymous LP.

== See also ==
- List of Billboard Easy Listening number ones of 1977
