= We'll Never Have to Say Goodbye Again =

- West German picture sleeve

Single by England Dan & John Ford Coley

from the album Some Things Don't Come Easy
- B-side: "Calling For You Again"
- Released: February 17, 1978
- Recorded: 1977
- Genre: Pop rock; soft rock
- Length: 2:49
- Label: Big Tree
- Songwriter: Jeffrey Comanor
- Producer: Kyle Lehning

England Dan & John Ford Coley singles chronology
"Gone Too Far" (1977)	"We'll Never Have to Say Goodbye Again" (1978)	"You Can't Dance" (1978)

Audio sample
- file; help

"We'll Never Have to Say Goodbye Again" is a song by Jeffrey Comanor from the album A Rumor in His Own Time, which debuted in September 1976. Written by Comanor, the song describes a couple who spend a night together, one which the narrator wishes would "never end". Both the song, which Epic Records released as a single, and the album failed to chart.

Discovered four months later by Arista Records President Clive Davis, "We'll Never Have to Say Goodbye Again" was covered by soft rock duo Deardorff & Joseph for their eponymous debut album, released on Arista. After Deardorff & Joseph disbanded, Marcia Day, who managed Maureen McGovern, became the manager of Deardorff, while Susan Joseph, who managed England Dan & John Ford Coley, became the manager of Joseph. Both McGovern and England Dan & John Ford Coley released covers of "We'll Never Have to Say Goodbye Again" in February 1978; while McGovern's failed to chart, Dan & Coley's spent six weeks at number one on the Billboard US Easy Listening chart, reached number two on the RPM Canada Adult Contemporary chart, and went to numbers nine and eleven on the magazines' respective overall charts.

== Original release ==
Lyricist and composer Jeffrey Comanor recorded "We'll Never Have to Say Goodbye Again" for the album A Rumor in His Own Time, which debuted in September 1976. Produced by John Boylan and released on Epic Records, both the album and the single failed to chart. "We'll Never Have to Say Goodbye Again" describes a couple that spends a night together, one which the narrator wishes "would never end". Comanor, who wrote the song, stated that his lyrical inspiration originated from a girl he dated who owned a wooden KLH radio that continued to play music quietly when he attempted to turn it off. When Comanor's next girlfriend, Molly, left the city where he lived, he remembered their last night together and how he "hated that night to end": a combination of the two memories that were formed the introductory lyrics of the song.

== Covers ==
After its release, Arista Records President Clive Davis found the song and wanted Melissa Manchester to record a cover; instead, he gave it to Deardorff & Joseph, a duo of Danny Deardorff and Marcus Joseph, who previously opened for Seals and Crofts, and they recorded it for their eponymous debut album. Released as a single in January 1977, with "The Little Kings of Earth" on the B-side, the song peaked at number twenty-two on the U.S. Easy Listening chart for two weeks in April 1977. The single did not do well on the Billboard Hot 100, and "bubbled under" at number 109.

Nineteen months after its initial debut, England Dan & John Ford Coley covered the song for the album Some Things Don't Come Easy. Produced by Kyle Lehning and engineered by Lehning and Marshall Morgan with help from Tom Knox, Big Tree Records issued it as a single on February 17, 1978; the song's debut preceded its album. A Billboard magazine writer described England Dan & John Ford Coley's cover of "We'll Never Have to Say Goodbye Again" as a soft ballad with a "catchy chorus" and "excellent vocal harmonizing". In a review of Some Things Don't Come Easy for AllMusic, Joe Viglione called it "far and away the best song on the album" and wrote that its "hook and instrumentation are so radio-friendly that the 45 could be put on repeat and after the 30th spin not bore like many of the tracks [on Some Things Don't Come Easy]". Another Billboard writer listed "We'll Never Have to Say Goodbye Again" as a "hot cut" from the album, along with "You Can't Dance", "Calling for You Again", and "Lovin' Someone on a Rainy Night". "Calling for You Again", written by Coley and Bob Grundy, was the B-side to the single. Cash Box said that it has "a gentle uplift to a strong chorus, effective vocals and piano-guitar interaction."

In February, Maureen McGovern also recorded a cover that Epic Records released as a single. After Deardorff & Joseph separated, Marcia Day, who managed McGovern, became the manager of Danny Deardorff, while Susan Joseph, who managed Dan & Coley, became the manager of Marcus Joseph. According to Day, Susan told her that "We'll Never Have to Say Goodbye Again" would "absolutely not" be Dan & Coley's next single, and that McGovern could release a cover; Susan, however, states that she did not know of its plans for future release. On March 17, 1978, McGovern promoted her song on the fourth season of the variety talk show Dinah!, which aired on NBC. Described by Epic as the "title song" to McGovern's newest album, the cover did not appear on her next album and the single failed to chart.

== Chart performance ==
On March 25, 1978, in their "Top Album Pick" section, Billboard predicted that the first single from Some Things Don't Come Easy would reach the top ten; afterwards, it went to number nine on the magazine's Hot 100 chart and spent six weeks at number one on their Easy Listening chart. Cashbox placed the song at number fourteen on their US Top 100 Singles chart for the week that ended on April 29, 1978. In Canada, "We'll Never Have to Say Goodbye Again" peaked on the RPM Top Singles chart at number eleven, while on the Adult Contemporary Tracks chart, the song peaked at number two behind "Dust in the Wind" by the progressive rock band Kansas.

=== Weekly singles charts ===
Deardorff & Joseph
Chart (1977)	Peak position
US Billboard Hot 100	109
US Adult Contemporary (Billboard)	22
US Cash Box Top 100	99

England Dan & John Ford Coley
Chart (1978)	Peak position
Canada Top Singles (RPM)	11
Canada Adult Contemporary (RPM)	2
US Billboard Hot 100	9
US Adult Contemporary (Billboard)	1
US Cashbox Top 100	14

=== Year-end charts ===
England Dan & John Ford Coley
Chart (1978)	Position
Canada Top Singles (RPM)	85

== See also ==
- List of Billboard Easy Listening number ones of 1978
