= Southwest F.O.B. =

1960s psychedelic rock group from Dallas, Texas

Southwest F.O.B. ("Freight on Board") was a 1960s psychedelic rock group from Dallas, Texas, now perhaps best remembered because it featured Dan Seals and John Colley, who later found great success as the duo England Dan & John Ford Coley. Southwest F.O.B. also included Michael (Doc) Woolbright on bass.

Dan Seals and classmate John Colley, who later changed the spelling of his last name to Coley, formed a group with three other Samuell students called the Playboys Five. That became Theze Few, which morphed into the band Southwest F.O.B. with guitar player Larry "Ovid" Stevens when they were students at W. W. Samuell High School in Dallas. The band secured a minor hit in 1968 (reaching number 56) with a cover of the West Coast Pop Art Experimental Band song "Smell of Incense", nationally released on the Stax subsidiary label Hip Records. The band's sole LP was also called Smell of Incense; it has been reissued as a remastered, expanded CD by Sundazed Music, and is now out of print. Later success eluded them, and the band broke up in 1969.

"We were very popular in the late 1960s", Coley said. "We even opened for Led Zeppelin and Three Dog Night, and remember, we were just high school kids".

Dan Seals died on March 25, 2009.

== Discography ==
=== Album ===
Year	Title	Label
1968	Smell of Incense	Hip

=== Singles ===
Year	Title	Billboard Hot 100	Label
1968	"Smell of Incense"	56	Hip
1969	"Nadine"	—	Hip
1969	"As I Look at You"	—	Hip
1969	"Feelin' Groovy"	115	Hip
