= Ron Jones (American football) =

American football player (born 1947)

No. 88
- Position: Tight end

Personal information
- Born: October 7, 1946 (age 80); Dallas, Texas, U.S.
- Listed height: 6 ft 3 in (1.91 m)
- Listed weight: 220 lb (100 kg)

Career information
- High school: W. W. Samuell (Texas)
- College: Trinity Valley (1965–1966); UTEP (1967–1968)
- NFL draft: 1969: 6th round, 134th overall pick

Career history
- Green Bay Packers (1969); Atlanta Falcons (1971)*
- * Offseason or practice squad member only

Career NFL statistics
- Games played: 6
- Stats at Pro Football Reference

Ronald Gene Jones (born October 7, 1946) is an American former professional football player in the National Football League (NFL). A tight end, he played college football for the Trinity Valley Cardinals and UTEP Miners. He was selected by the Green Bay Packers in the sixth round of the 1969 NFL/AFL draft. He played the 1969 season for the Packers and was also briefly a member of the Atlanta Falcons.

== Early life and college career ==
Jones was born on October 7, 1946, in Dallas, Texas. He attended W. W. Samuell High School in Dallas where he played football as an end. After high school, he attended Trinity Valley Community College from 1965 to 1966. While at Trinity, he married Carolyn Jones, a fellow classmate. A tight end, he played for the Trinity Valley Cardinals before transferring to the University of Texas at El Paso (UTEP) to join the UTEP Miners football team in 1967. Jones attended UTEP from 1967 to 1968, receiving varsity letters with the football team each year.

Upon joining UTEP, Jones stood at 6 feet 4 inches (1.93 m) and weighed 223 pounds (101 kg). As a junior, he competed with freshman Major Stevenson and redshirt Fran Pilarcek for the starting tight end role for the Miners. He won the job and caught 26 passes for 394 yards and four touchdowns during the 1967 season. The 1967 UTEP team compiled a record of 7–2–1 and won the 1967 Sun Bowl over the Ole Miss Rebels. The El Paso Herald-Post reported that he "attracted a good deal [of] attention in the Sun Bowl" and displayed "impressive" strength. Then, as a senior in 1968, Jones caught 31 passes for 430 yards for UTEP, being named first-team All-Western Athletic Conference (WAC). He placed ninth in the WAC in receptions and eighth in the conference in receiving yards. The 1968 Miners compiled a record of 4–5–1.

== Professional career and later life ==
Jones was selected by the Green Bay Packers in the sixth round (134th overall) of the 1969 NFL/AFL draft. Along with Leon Harden, he was one of two UTEP players selected by the Packers. He impressed in training camp, with assistant coach Bob Schnelker describing him and Tom Buckman as "two of the best tight end prospects we've had since I've been here". He was waived/injured to begin the season and later placed on the taxi squad. He was then activated and appeared in six games during the 1969 season. In September 1970, Jones was traded to the Atlanta Falcons. He did not appear in any games for the Falcons and was later released in August 1971.

Following his football career, Jones worked in the organized crime unit for the Dallas Sheriff's Department. In the late 1970s and early 1980s, he was a member of a reunion football team, composed of old UTEP players, that played in the spring against the current UTEP roster.
