= Kristin Garner =

American country music singer-songwriter

- Origin: Owego, New York
- Genres: Country, Christian
- Occupation: Singer-songwriter
- Years active: 2000–present
- Labels: Atlantic Records, Warner Music Group

Kristin Garner (born in Owego, New York) is an American country music singer-songwriter. Garner was signed to Atlantic Records in the year 2000. Atlantic Records contracted with Kyle Lehning to produce Garner's first album. While on a promotional radio tour, her debut single "Let's Burn It Down" debuted on the Billboard Hot Country Singles & Tracks chart in May 2001 and rose to number 59. Garner performed at Fan Fair in downtown Nashville in June 2001. Atlantic Records (Nashville) closed in 2002 and released all eleven of its signed artists. Garner was one of a few Atlantic artists that were offered deals with other major recording labels. Garner accepted a second recording contract with Warner Brothers. After a few unproductive years with Warner, Garner asked for her release.

Garner married Shayne Hill in 2005. They have two children, Jesse and Harper. Hill is currently the lead guitarist for the popular country music band Sawyer Brown. Garner is on the staff as the worship director of the mega-church Bethel World Outreach church in Brentwood, Tennessee. Garner and Hill are active in writing and producing Contemporary Christian/Worship songs for EveryNation, a network of approximately 400 member churches in Asia, Africa, Europe, Oceania, and the Americas. They have also performed as guest worship leaders for Trinity Broadcasting Network (TBN), the world-wide Christian television network, as part of their "Praise the Lord" series.

== Discography ==
=== Singles ===
Year	Single	Peak positions
Year	Single	US Country
2001	"Let's Burn It Down"	59
2001	"Singing to the Scarecrow"	—
"—" denotes releases that did not chart
