= W. W. Samuell High School =

Location
- 8928 Palisade Drive; Dallas, Texas 75217; United States; 32°44′46″N 96°40′08″W

Information
- Type: Public, Secondary
- Motto: Together We Make It Happen
- School district: Dallas Independent School District
- Principal: Gabriel Guerra
- Faculty: 121 (2015)
- Teaching staff: 125.66 (FTE)
- Grades: 9-12
- Enrollment: 1,878 (2023–2024)
- Student to teacher ratio: 14.95
- Colors: Blue and Gold
- Mascot: Spartan
- Trustee dist.: 4, Nancy Bingham
- Area: 1, Ivonne Durant
- Website: www.dallasisd.org/samuell

W. W. Samuell High School and Early College is a public secondary school located in the Pleasant Grove area of Dallas, Texas, US. Samuell High enrolls students in grades 9–12 and is a part of the Dallas Independent School District. The school serves portions of southeast Dallas and a portion of the city of Balch Springs.

In 2015, the school was rated "met standard" by the Texas Education Agency.

== Notable alumni ==
- John Ford Coley — soft rock musician with Dan Seals in the musical duo England Dan & John Ford Coley; hits include "I'd Really Love to See You Tonight"
- Ron Jones — 1969 NFL tight end for the Green Bay Packers
- Joe Kendall — former federal judge (1992–2002)
- Russ Martin — host of The Russ Martin Show, a radio program in Dallas
- Carl Mitcham — professor of technology and engineering, now at Colorado School of Mines
- Steve Ramsey — punter/quarterback for the New Orleans Saints (1970), Denver Broncos (1971–76)
- Lulu Roman — former Hee Haw TV show personality
- Dan Seals — country and soft rock musician also known as England Dan in the duo with John Ford Coley
- Dale Tillery — former Texas state representative for District 10
- Stanley Hauerwas — world-renowned theologian
- Paul Richard Alexander — lawyer and paralytic polio survivor, one of the last known people living in an iron lung; first to graduate without ever physically attending a class
