= Leon Harden =

American football player (1947–2017)

Lee Harden
No. 28
- Position: Defensive back

Personal information
- Born: August 17, 1947; Kansas City, Missouri, U.S.
- Died: June 24, 2017 (aged 69); Kansas City, Missouri, U.S.
- Listed height: 5 ft 11 in (1.80 m)
- Listed weight: 195 lb (88 kg)

Career information
- High school: Southeast (Kansas City)
- College: Pratt CC (1965–1966); UTEP (1967–1968)
- NFL draft: 1969: 11th round, 272nd overall pick

Career history
- Green Bay Packers (1969–1971); San Diego Chargers (1972)*; Chicago Fire (1974)*; Detroit Wheels (1974)*
- * Offseason or practice squad member only

Career NFL statistics
- Games played: 8
- Punt returns: 2
- Stats at Pro Football Reference

Leon Maurice Harden Jr. (August 17, 1947 – June 24, 2017) was an American professional football player. A defensive back, he played college football for the Pratt Beavers and UTEP Miners and was selected by the Green Bay Packers in the 11th round of the 1969 NFL/AFL draft. He was a member of the team's taxi squad in 1969 before playing in seven games in 1970. He was released prior to the 1971 season and later had stints with the San Diego Chargers and the Chicago Fire and Detroit Wheels of the World Football League (WFL).

== Early life ==
Harden was born on August 17, 1947, in Kansas City, Missouri. He attended Southeast High School, where he played football. He played three years there and was a "star" player, according to The Kansas City Times. Harden is one of six Southeast alumni to play in the NFL. After high school, Harden attended Pratt Community College, playing football for the Pratt Beavers as starting wingback.

Harden played for Pratt from 1965 to 1966 before transferring to the University of Texas at El Paso (UTEP) in 1967, where he joined the UTEP Miners football team. As a junior in 1967, he played as a backup defensive back and was the team's kickoff specialist. The 1967 UTEP team compiled a record of 7–2–1 and won the 1967 Sun Bowl over the Ole Miss Rebels. He remained kickoff specialist and started at defensive back for the Miners in 1968, a year in which they went 4–5–1. In addition to playing defense and as a kickoff specialist, Harden was also used by UTEP on offense at times. In college, he stood at 5 feet 11 inches (1.80 m) and weighed 198 pounds (90 kg).

== Professional career ==
Harden was selected by the Green Bay Packers in the 11th round (272nd overall) of the 1969 NFL/AFL draft. He was chosen to play defensive back and was one of two UTEP players – along with tight end Ron Jones – to be selected by the Packers in the draft. He was released at the beginning of the season but was then placed on the taxi squad. He told Lee Remmel in the West Bend News of his experience on the taxi squad: "It was very beneficial. But you want to suit up and get out there and play. It seemed when you were in the locker room before a game, you had the same sense of the game the guys who were suiting up had. You're motivated just as they are ... Then you realize you're not going to play. It's a heckuva felling – you get a big letdown."

Harden competed for a roster spot in 1970, telling Remmel that "I want to make it more than anything in the world". He was initially released before the season-opener, but later re-signed and was activated in November. He ended up appearing in seven games for the Packers as a backup during the season. In 1971, he was released and then offered a position on the taxi squad but declined.

Harden was briefly a member of the San Diego Chargers in 1972. He signed with the Chicago Fire of the World Football League (WFL) in 1974. Soon after, he was traded to the Detroit Wheels, who released him before the season started, ending his professional career.

== Later life and death ==
After his football career, Harden worked for Southwestern Bell for 30 years, where he held the position of Regional Vice-President, External Affairs at the time of his retirement. He also served as treasurer for the South Suburban Basketball Association and was a board member for the Kansas City Crime Commission, Surviving Spouses and Family Endowment and Second Chance organizations. Harden died on June 24, 2017, at the age of 69.
