= Parker McGee =

American singer-songwriter (born 1951)

- Born: Jerry Parker McGee; April 1951 (age 75)
- Origin: Meridian, Mississippi, United States
- Genres: Soft rock, country, pop
- Occupations: Guitarist, singer, songwriter, pianist
- Instruments: Vocals, guitar, piano
- Years active: 1972–present
- Label: Big Tree

Jerry Parker McGee (born April 1951) is a Nashville-based singer-songwriter, originally from Meridian, Mississippi.

== Early life ==
McGee was born in Meridian, Mississippi, one of three sons, to Albert R. "Pat" McGee, and Ruby McGee. He graduated from Meridian High School in 1969.

== Career ==
McGee struggled early in his career, and at one point was living in a school bus parked behind a recording studio in Jackson, Mississippi. There he met Illinois-born producer Kyle Lehning, in 1972, which proved to be a turning point in their careers. Lehning, who had left Nashville earlier after failing to find work, returned there in 1973 to take a job as a studio engineer. McGee followed him there a short time later after the studio in Jackson had gone bankrupt, and began studio session work.

Both Lehning and McGee continued their friendship, constantly exchanging ideas. In 1974, Tanya Tucker recorded McGee's "Depend on You" for her Lovin' and Learnin' album. Not long afterwards, McGee signed with Dawnbreaker Music, a family publishing outfit involving brothers Dan and Jim Seals, whose albums as members of England Dan & John Ford Coley and Seals & Crofts, respectively, would bear songs with McGee songwriting credits.

McGee's big breakthrough came in 1976 with "I'd Really Love to See You Tonight". The song came to the attention of England Dan & John Ford Coley, who had been dropped from their former label, A&M Records, after modest success. The duo played the song for Big Tree Records, and landed a record deal. McGee also penned "Nights Are Forever Without You", that proved to be another chart success for England Dan & John Ford Coley, and both songs went gold. This gave him the clout to secure a record deal of his own with Big Tree Records. His self-titled album was released in 1976, and yielded one hit single, "I Just Can't Say No to You", which reached number 42 on the Billboard Hot 100 and number 7 on Billboard's Adult Contemporary chart.

The song "Goodbye Old Buddies", written by McGee was recorded by Seals & Crofts for their 1976 album Get Closer. The track was also recorded by McGee and appears on his album. The Seals & Crofts version peaked at number 10 on Billboard's Adult Contemporary chart.

== Personal life ==
McGee resides in Arrington, a Nashville suburb, with his wife Alison.

== Discography ==
=== Album ===
- 1976: Parker McGee

=== Singles ===
- 1976: "Boy Meets Girl"
- 1976: "I Just Can't Say No to You" - U.S. #42, U.S. AC #7
- 1976: "This Magic Night"
- 1977: "A Little Love and Understanding"/"Got That Feeling"
- 1977: "Angel Dancing"
- 1983: "Living to the Beat"
