= Fables (England Dan & John Ford Coley album) =

Studio album by England Dan & John Ford Coley
- Released: June 12, 1972
- Recorded: 1971
- Studio: A&M (Hollywood)
- Genre: Soft rock
- Label: A&M
- Producer: Louie Shelton

England Dan & John Ford Coley chronology
England Dan & John Ford Coley (1971)	Fables (1972)	I Hear Music (1976)

Professional ratings
Review scores
Source	Rating
Allmusic	3/5 stars

Fables is the second studio album by England Dan & John Ford Coley.

== Track listing ==
All songs written by John Ford Coley and Dan Seals, except where noted.

=== Side one ===
1. "Simone"
2. "Casey"
3. "Free The People"
4. "What I'm Doing"

=== Side two ===
1. "Carolina" (Kerry Chater, Roger Karshner)
2. "Tomorrow"
3. "Candles of Our Lives"
4. "Matthew"
5. "Stay by the River"

== Personnel ==
- Dan Seals – lead vocals (1, 3–9), backing vocals, acoustic guitar
- John Ford Coley – lead vocals (2–9), backing vocals, acoustic guitar, acoustic piano (4)
- Louis Shelton – electric guitar (1, 3), bass guitar (3, 4), guitar (4, 5, 8), electric sitar (9)
- Larry Muhoberac – acoustic piano (1, 8), keyboards (2)
- Clarence McDonald – organ (3, 7), keyboards (5)
- Larry Knechtel – acoustic piano (6, 9)
- Don Randi – organ (8, 9)
- Reinie Press – bass guitar (1, 5, 7)
- Jack Conrad – bass guitar (2)
- Max Bennett – bass guitar (6, 8, 9)
- Russ Kunkel – drums (1, 2)
- Jim Gordon – drums (3, 4)
- Hal Blaine – drums (5, 7)
- Paul Humphrey – drums (6)
- John Guerin – drums (8, 9)
- Bobbye Hall Porter – percussion (8, 9)
- Marty Paich – string arrangements
