= I'd Really Love to See You Tonight =

Single by England Dan & John Ford Coley

from the album Nights Are Forever
- B-side: "It's Not the Same"
- Released: May 1976
- Studio: Studio by the Pond, Hendersonville, Tennessee, US
- Genre: Soft rock
- Length: 2:39
- Label: Big Tree (US); Atlantic (UK)
- Songwriter: Parker McGee
- Producer: Kyle Lehning

England Dan & John Ford Coley singles chronology
"Simone" (1972)	"I'd Really Love to See You Tonight" (1976)	"Nights Are Forever Without You" (1977)

"I'd Really Love to See You Tonight" is a song written by Parker McGee and recorded by England Dan & John Ford Coley from their 1976 album Nights Are Forever. It eventually peaked at No. 2 on the Billboard Hot 100 chart for two weeks, behind Wild Cherry's "Play That Funky Music" and No. 1 on the Easy Listening chart. Billboard ranked it as the No. 21 song for 1976. It also reached No. 26 on the UK Singles Chart.

Record World called it a "sparkling tune with its extraordinary melodic hook." In 2024 Ultimate Classic Rock critic Michael Gallucci rated it as the 6th greatest soft rock song, saying that "The transcendent chorus ranks among the era's best."

Dan Seals, the "England Dan" half of the duo, re-recorded the song in 1995 in an acoustic country version for the album In a Quiet Room. Coley recorded his version on his 2008 self-titled live EP.

In 2026, Coley recorded new vocals for a 50th anniversary edition of the song. The accompanying music video features archive footage of the duo and new footage of Coley.

== Chart history ==
=== Weekly charts ===
Chart (1976)	Peak position
Australia (Kent Music Report)	25
Canada RPM Top Singles	5
Canada RPM Adult Contemporary	1
New Zealand (RIANZ)	15
UK Singles Chart (OCC)	26
US Billboard Hot 100	2
US Billboard Easy Listening	1
US Cash Box Top 100	4

=== Year-end charts ===
Chart (1976)	Rank
Canada	67
US Billboard Hot 100	21
US Billboard Easy Listening	2
US Cash Box	47

=== All-time charts ===
Chart (1958-2018)	Position
US Billboard Hot 100	320

== Other versions ==
- Dee Dee Sharp Gamble covered the song on her 1977 album What Color Is Love.
- Reba McEntire and Jacky Ward covered the song in 1978 as part of a double-sided single with "Three Sheets in the Wind". Their version reached number 20 on the Billboard Hot Country Songs chart.
- Ian McShane covered the song on his 1992 album From Both Sides Now.
- Barry Manilow covered it on the 1996 album Summer of '78.
- Charlie McGettigan and Paul Harrington covered it on the album Rock 'n' Roll Kids.
- Lillo Thomas covered the song on this 2010 album Come and Get It.
- Teresa Carpio covered the song on her 1977 self-titled album.
- Wolfgang Petry (Pete Wolf Band) covered the song on his 2017 album Happy Man
- The song appears in the Broadway musical Disaster!.
