= Toby Beau =

American music group

Toby Beau is an American band from Texas, formed in the early 1970s and perhaps best known for the 1978 hit single, "My Angel Baby". The band is still in existence today and continues to perform on the club circuit. The band's name was based from one of the last original wooden shrimp boats docked in the Gulf Coast community of Port Isabel, Texas.

== Formation ==
Formed in the Rio Grande Valley in south Texas, the original members included guitarists Danny McKenna, Balde Silva, Art Mendoza, bassist Steve Zipper, and drummer Rob Young. After numerous club performances around South Texas, the band moved to San Antonio, Texas, and received a recording contract with RCA Records. This deal also recruited the production talents of Sean Delaney, who at the time was also producing Kiss. In addition, guitarist Mendoza was replaced with guitarist and banjoist extraordinaire Ron Rose, who added a country flavor to the band. During the early years, a producer/engineer from Falcon Records heard the group at one of the local clubs and talked with Danny McKenna, Balde Silva, and Art Mendoza about recording a few original songs. After hundreds of hours in the studio, the group went to record at Robin Hood Bryan's studio in Tyler, Texas, so they could get the string players from Dallas to play on a couple of songs. After a few months, a session was booked at the RCA studios in Hollywood, California. Balde and Rennetta Silva (Toby Beau) are currently performing around the world and still work with today with special appearances by son Michael Silva (saxophones, keyboards, vocals).

Other members included Phil Redmond (keyboards, vocals), Michael Flores (lead guitar, vocals), Michael Aguilar (drums), Don Pope (saxophone), Randy Lalane (trumpet), Gil Gonzales (bass), Floyd Simpson (vocals), Steve Williams (keyboards, vocals), Terri Williams (keyboards, vocals), Michael Schuler (trumpet), and James Marsh (keyboards, vocals).

== "My Angel Baby" ==
Upon completion of the self-titled first album, the band moved to New York, and embarked on major tours with artists and bands such as the Doobie Brothers, Bob Seger, and the Steve Miller Band. Popularity of the band gradually rose through these tours, but this skyrocketed when the pop ballad "My Angel Baby" (co-written by Danny McKenna and Balde Silva) scored number 1 on the Easy Listening Chart for one week, and number 13 on the Billboard Hot 100. The album scored major sales, and "My Angel Baby" would eventually achieve gold status, and be granted the "Million-Aire Award" by BMI for over a million radio airplays. There was even a re-release of the album, this time with "My Angel Baby" as the album title, which was added to the cover art.

== More Than a Love Song ==
Following the success of the first album, the band temporarily moved to Miami. There, recording sessions for the second album would not be impressive to the producers, and almost all recorded songs were eliminated from the album. It was suggested that the band move to Tennessee and record with major session players. It was this move that started to break the band apart.

Although the addition of the production talents of Daniel Moore (songwriter for B. W. Stevenson and Three Dog Night) and Norbert Putnam (who had worked with Jimmy Buffett), as well as musicians such as Victor Feldman (from Steely Dan fame) and Larrie Londin (who later worked with Journey) provided a smooth fusion style to the music, members of the band felt the tradition of the music was severely altered. This initially resulted in McKenna's choice to leave the band before completion of the second album, entitled More Than a Love Song, released in 1979. According to those who knew him, McKenna felt morally compelled to walk away rather than sell out those bandmates risking replacement by studio musicians.

The second album scored a Billboard Hot 100 single with the cover of John D. Loudermilk's "Then You Can Tell Me Goodbye," but otherwise the album remained a financial disappointment to the band, and less than a year after the release, Zipper, Rose, and Young departed, leaving Silva at the helm with one album left on the contract.

== If You Believe ==
Although it was a large burden on Silva to complete the third album single-handedly, this provided numerous successes, such as all legal rights to retain the band's name. He then moved to Los Angeles, California, to record the third album with producer Jerry Fuller. With the help of numerous studio artists, the third album, If You Believe was released in 1980. Although not viewed as a commercial success, the album did score a third hit with the ballad "If I Were You," which might demonstrate a preview of how the band would sound in years to come.

== 1980s to the present ==
RCA dropped the band after recording their third album, but Silva has refused to let the band fall, having adopted the name of "Toby Beau" himself as his stage name. In the 1980s, wife Rennetta (under the stage name Dennett) joined the band and the two recruited numerous other musicians in the band for years to come. Sessions for a fourth album have been recorded numerous times in the 1980s and again in the late 1990s, but no plans have been made yet for any studio release, but self-made recordings have been produced, and can usually be bought from members of the band or at certain venues they work for.

Currently, Silva continues to perform the club circuit using the Toby Beau name, with guest musicians who sit in frequently. Most recent guest musicians have included trumpeter and piano player Michael Schuler and Silva's son, saxophonist Michael Silva. The band can usually be found around South Padre Island, Texas and performing for the cruise ship industry or by checking the web site.

In April 2006, Daniel McKenna was found dead in his home in McAllen, Texas. McAllen police said McKenna shot himself in his bathroom at age 54. McKenna, who was born in Donna, departed from the band before it completed its second album. His 24-year-old daughter, Emily told the press that "He played the guitar since he was 5 or 6 years old. He repaired, restored, refurbished and built all string instruments." She said her father had extremely bad allergies to all types of trees, grass, dust and even food. The illness kept him from doing the things he loved — like playing music. He looked for other places to live, but "still felt like he couldn't breathe." “He was sick of being sick,” she said.

Up until about a year prior, McKenna played every during Saturday night worship service with the McFirst Praise Team. And he was the lead guitarist on a church-produced CD, Look What the Lord Has Done, said Susan Geissler, a retired school counselor and McKenna's friend. His music was exactly what some people seeking spiritual guidance needed, she said. "He has that one-of-a-kind harmony and rhythm that added to the message that would touch the soul."

== Discography ==
=== Studio albums ===
| Date | Title | US 200 | AUS |
|---|---|---|---|
| 1978 | Toby Beau (re-released as My Angel Baby) | 40 | 91 |
| 1979 | More Than a Love Song | 204 | - |
| 1980 | If You Believe | - | - |

=== Compilation albums ===
| Date | Title | US 200 |
|---|---|---|
| 1999 | My Angel Baby: The Very Best of Toby Beau | - |

=== Singles ===
| Date | Title | US 100 | US AC | AUS | CAN | CAN AC |
|---|---|---|---|---|---|---|
| 1978 | "My Angel Baby" | 13 | 1 | 63 | 10 | 9 |
| 1979 | "Then You Can Tell Me Goodbye" | 57 | 7 | - | - | - |
| 1980 | "If I Were You" | 70 | - | - | - | - |
