= My Angel Baby =

Single by Toby Beau
- B-side: "California"
- Released: April 1978
- Genre: Soft rock; white soul
- Length: 3:31
- Label: RCA Records
- Composers: Danny McKenna; Balde Silva
- Producer: Sean Delaney

Toby Beau singles chronology
"My Angel Baby" (1978)	"Then You Can Tell Me Goodbye" (1979)

"My Angel Baby" is a 1978 song by Toby Beau. "My Angel Baby" was written by band members Danny McKenna and Balde Silva. The single, from the group's self-titled album, went to #1 on the Easy Listening chart for one week, and peaked at #13 on the Billboard Hot 100. "My Angel Baby" was the group's only Top 40 single. In Canada, the song reached #10 on the Top 100 chart.

"My Angel Baby" was a bigger Adult Contemporary hit, reaching the Top 10 in both nations.

== Charts ==
=== Weekly charts ===
Chart (1978)	Peak position
Canada RPM Top Singles	10
Canada RPM Adult Contemporary	9
US Billboard Hot 100	13
US Easy Listening (Billboard)	1
US Cash Box Top 100	10

=== Year-end charts ===
Chart (1978)	Rank
Canada	69
US Billboard Hot 100	53
US Cash Box Top 100	80
