= Happy Man =

Happy Man may refer to:

- A Happy Man (1932 film) (Un homme heureux), a French film by Antonin Bideau
- A Happy Man (2009 film) (Le Bonheur de Pierre), a Canadian film by Robert Ménard
- "Happy Man" (Cathal Dunne song), 1979
- "Happy Man" (Sunnyboys song), 1981
- "Happy Man", a song by Chic from C'est Chic, 1978
- "Happy Man", a song by Jungle from For Ever, 2018
- "Happyman", a song by Leas Than Jake for Losing Streak, 1996

== See also ==
- Happy Human, an icon adopted as a symbol of secular humanism
