= Just Tell Me You Love Me =

Soundtrack album by England Dan & John Ford Coley
- Released: September 1980
- Genres: Pop rock; soft rock
- Label: MCA
- Producer: Dick Halligan

England Dan & John Ford Coley chronology
The Best of England Dan and John Ford Coley (1978)	Just Tell Me You Love Me (1980)	The Best of England Dan and John Ford Coley Vol. 2 (1981)

Just Tell Me You Love Me is a 1980 soundtrack album to the film of the same name, with songs performed by the pop rock duo England Dan & John Ford Coley. The album was released by MCA Records.

== Track listing ==
All tracks composed by Carol Connors and Dick Halligan, except where indicated.

1. "Just Tell Me You Love Me"
2. "Part of Me, Part of You" (John Ford Coley, Bob Gundry, Dan Seals)
3. "I'm Going to Find Tomorrow"
4. "Leaving It All Behind" (Coley, Gundry, Seals)
5. "Maui" (Halligan)
6. "Movin' On Down the Line" (Coley, Gundry, Seals)
7. "Never, Never Night" (Coley, Gundry, Seals)
8. "Rainbows for Your Eyes"
9. "Life Is Beautiful"
10. "Just Tell Me You Love Me" (Instrumental)
