= England Dan & John Ford Coley (album) =

Studio album by England Dan & John Ford Coley
- Released: August 1971
- Genre: Soft rock
- Label: A&M
- Producer: Louie Shelton

England Dan & John Ford Coley chronology
| England Dan & John Ford Coley (1971) | Fables (1971) |

England Dan & John Ford Coley is the first studio album by the pop rock duo of the same name.

== Track listing ==
All songs written by John Ford Coley and Dan Seals.

1. "Mud and Stone" - 2:46
2. "Miss Me" - 3:06
3. "Swamp River" - 2:20
4. "Tell Her Hello" - 3:15
5. "Lady Rose" - 2:49
6. "New Jersey" - 3:00
7. "Winning Side" - 3:15
8. "Elysian Fields" - 2:50
9. "I'm Home" - 2:10
10. "Ask the Rain" - 1:58

== Personnel ==
- Performers – England Dan Seals and John Ford Coley
- Arrangements – Artie Butler, Jimmie Haskell, and Louie Shelton

== Production ==
- Producer – Louie Shelton
- Engineer – Henry Lewy
- Art Direction – Roland Young
- Design – Chuck Beeson
- Photography – Frank Laffittle
- Liner Notes – Bob Garcia
