= England Dan & John Ford Coley =

American soft rock duo (1970–1980)

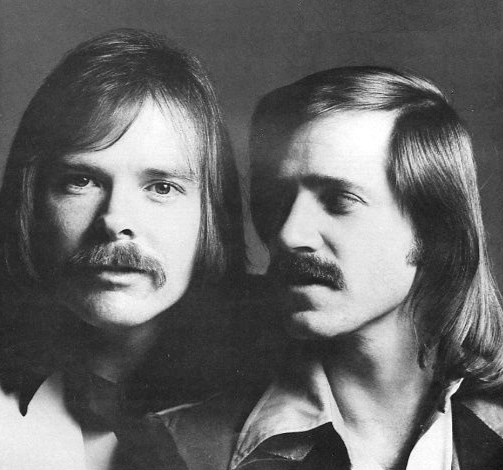
- England Dan (left) and John Ford Coley, 1976

Background information
- Origin: Dallas, Texas, U.S.
- Genres: Pop rock, soft rock, country rock
- Years active: 1970–1980
- Labels: A&M, Big Tree
- Past members: Dan Seals; John Ford Coley

England Dan & John Ford Coley were an American soft rock duo composed of Dan Seals and John Ford Coley, active throughout the 1970s. Native Texans, they are best known for their 1976 single "I'd Really Love to See You Tonight", a No. 2 hit on the Billboard Hot 100 and a No. 1 Adult Contemporary hit. After they disbanded, Seals began performing as Dan Seals and launched a country music career through the 1980s which produced 11 No. 1 country hits.

== Career ==
=== Early years ===
The duo began while they were friends and classmates at W. W. Samuell High School in Dallas, Texas, United States. Seals and Coley performed first as part of local cover bands, including Playboys Five and Theze Few. They recorded a series of demos in Nashville as The Shimmerers, but their prospects ended when their producer died before he could secure a recording deal for them. Their next grouping was Dallas pop/psych group Southwest F.O.B. ("Freight on Board"), whose material has been re-released on CD by the Sundazed label.

Seals was the younger brother of Jim Seals of the 1970s soft rock duo Seals and Crofts. Dan's childhood nickname, given to him by his brother Jim, was "England Dan" because he was a fan of English rock band The Beatles, and he occasionally adopted an affected English accent. John Colley's last name was re-spelled "Coley" for ease of pronunciation; "Ford" was added as his middle name for flow purposes, thus England Dan and John Ford Coley.

Both toured the Texas music scene where Southwest F.O.B. had one charting song, "The Smell of Incense", which rose to No. 56 on the pop chart in 1968. This band played on the bill with such acts as Led Zeppelin. While in the group, Seals and Coley began their own acoustic act, Colley and Wayland. The act was renamed England Dan & John Ford Coley, and the duo signed with A&M Records in 1970. In 1971, they moved to Los Angeles where they opened for numerous bands. Their first break came in 1972, with the song "Simone". It became a No. 1 hit in Japan and also charted in France, but not in the US.

=== Big Tree and peak success ===
The duo was released from its contract with A&M in 1972 after two albums. Undaunted, the pair continued to press on, stumbling upon the song "I'd Really Love to See You Tonight", written by a young Mississippi-based songwriter, Parker McGee. They recorded a demo and played it in the office of Bob Greenberg, a senior VP at Atlantic Records. Atlantic had a subsidiary label named Big Tree in the same office and Big Tree's founder, Doug Morris, had heard the song through the wall and came into the room. When Greenberg decided against it, Morris said "We want it," and offered them a deal.

Dan and John were paired with producer Kyle Lehning, who had also produced McGee's demo. The result was a US No. 2 hit single in September 1976, which ultimately sold two million copies. July 1976 saw the release of England Dan & John Ford Coley's debut album for Big Tree, Nights Are Forever, also produced by Lehning. Their second Big Tree single, "Nights Are Forever Without You", also written by Parker McGee, also made the Billboard Top 10. After seeing the duo score a huge hit, A&M capitalized on the success by releasing a compilation album in 1976, I Hear Music, using songs recorded years earlier.

Both Seals and Coley embraced the Baháʼí Faith after Seals tried to "talk some sense" with his brother Jim, circa 1972. Years later, Coley returned to Christianity, but Seals remained Baháʼí until his death.

Their second Big Tree LP, Dowdy Ferry Road, followed in March 1977, yielding the hit singles, "It's Sad To Belong (To Someone Else)" (No. 21) (written by Randy Goodrum) and Coley's "Gone Too Far" (No. 23). The pair are also credited with writing and performing "It's All Up To You", the theme song to the 1977 NBC teen drama series James at 15.

Some Things Don't Come Easy (March 1978) provided "We'll Never Have to Say Goodbye Again", which peaked at No. 9 and Dr. Heckle and Mr. Jive (March 1979) brought forth "Love Is the Answer" (written by Todd Rundgren), which was their last Top 10 hit and their final time in the Top 40 altogether, as follow-up "What Can I Do With This Broken Heart" stalled at No. 50 in late 1979.

During their early years on the road, the two performers played as an acoustic duo, but during their "hit years" on Big Tree they toured with a backup band that included Danny Gorman (drums, percussion), Bubba Keith (guitar, backing vocals), John Leland (bass), Ovid Stevens (guitar) and Michael Vernacchio (keyboards, synthesizers).

In March 1980, "In It For Love", one of two new recordings added to The Best of England Dan and John Ford Coley (December 1979), managed to reach only No. 53 as a single. After contributing songs to the movie Just Tell Me You Love Me in 1980, the pair went their separate ways.

=== Aftermath ===
The duo split in 1980 when Seals decided to pursue a career in country music, where he found success throughout the 1980s, scoring hits such as "Meet Me in Montana" (with Marie Osmond) and "Bop". Seals died on March 25, 2009, following treatment for mantle cell lymphoma.

Coley formed another group that released an album on A&M Records: Leslie, Kelly and John Ford Coley (featuring sisters Leslie and Kelly Bulkin), then went on to do television and film appearances in the 1980s. He returned to an active touring schedule in the 1990s and 2000s and was also co-producer for acts such as Eddie Money (with Vince Gill) and Tom Wurth.

In 2026, Coley recorded new vocals for a 50th anniversary edition of "I'd Really Love to See You Tonight". The accompanying video features archive footage of the duo and new footage of Coley.

== Discography ==
=== Albums ===
Year	Album	Chart Positions			RIAA	Label
Year	Album	US	AUS	CAN	RIAA	Label
1971	England Dan & John Ford Coley	—	—	—	—	A&M
1972	Fables	—	—	—	—	A&M
1976	I Hear Music	202	—	—	—	A&M
1976	Nights Are Forever	17	68	11	Gold	Big Tree
1977	Dowdy Ferry Road	80	—	—	—	Big Tree
1978	Some Things Don't Come Easy	61	—	73	—	Big Tree
1979	Dr. Heckle and Mr. Jive	106	69	—	—	Big Tree
1979	The Best of England Dan and John Ford Coley	194	—	—	—	Big Tree
1980	Just Tell Me You Love Me (soundtrack)	—	—	—	—	Big Tree
1981	The Best of England Dan and John Ford Coley Vol. 2	—	—	—	—	Big Tree
1996	The Very Best of England Dan and John Ford Coley	—	—	—	—	Rhino
2015	The Atlantic Albums +	—	—	—	—	Edsel

=== Singles ===
Year	Single	Peak chart positions					RIAA	Album
Year	Single	US	US AC	CA	CA AC	AUS	RIAA	Album
1972	"New Jersey"	103	—	—	—	—	—	Fables
1972	"Simone"	—	—	—	—	—	—	Fables
1976	"I'd Really Love to See You Tonight"	2	1	5	1	25	Gold	Nights Are Forever
1976	"Nights Are Forever Without You"	10	6	10	4	92	—	Nights Are Forever
1977	"It's Sad to Belong"	21	1	9	1	90	—	Dowdy Ferry Road
1977	"Gone Too Far"	23	8	15	11	71	—	Dowdy Ferry Road
1978	"We'll Never Have to Say Goodbye Again"	9	1	11	2	—	—	Some Things Don't Come Easy
1978	"You Can't Dance"	49	22	62	34	—	—	Some Things Don't Come Easy
1978	"If the World Ran Out of Love Tonight"	—	41	—	—	—	—	Some Things Don't Come Easy
1978	"Westward Wind"	—	30	—	—	—	—	Nights Are Forever
1979	"Love Is the Answer"	10	1	33	18	79	—	Dr. Heckle & Mr. Jive
1979	"What Can I Do with This Broken Heart"	50	12	—	—	—	—	Dr. Heckle & Mr. Jive
1980	"In It for Love"	75	45	—	—	—	—	The Best of England Dan and John Ford Coley
1981	"Part of Me Part of You"	—	42	—	—	—	—	Just Tell Me You Love Me (soundtrack)

== Other sources ==
- Nite, Norm N. and Newman, Ralph M.: ROCK ON: The Illustrated Encyclopedia Of Rock N' Roll; Volume II: Thomas Y. Crowell: 1978, p. 152. ISBN 9780690011968
