= Kyle Lehning =

American record producer

- Born: Fred Kyle Lehning
- Origin: Cairo, Illinois, United States
- Genres: Country
- Occupation: Record producer
- Years active: 1970s–present

Kyle Lehning is an American record producer whose work is mainly in the field of country music. He has produced virtually every album released by Randy Travis, who described their partnership "an interesting relationship." The only exceptions are Travis' 1993 album Wind in the Wire, which was produced by Steve Gibson, 1998's You and You Alone and 1999's A Man Ain't Made of Stone, both of which Travis co-produced with Byron Gallimore and James Stroud.

Lehning has also produced for Dan Seals (and England Dan and John Ford Coley), George Jones, Bobby Bare, Alexis, Anne Murray, Joy Lynn White, Neal McCoy, Bryan White, Restless Heart, Kristin Garner and others.
