= Big Tree Records =

U.S. record label active 1970–1980

- Founded: 1970
- Founder: Doug Morris

Big Tree Records was a record label founded by Doug Morris in 1970. It was best known for releases by Lobo, England Dan & John Ford Coley, Brownsville Station, Johnny Rivers, Dave and Ansel Collins, Canadian band April Wine, pop/R&B vocal trio Hot, and British R&B group Hot Chocolate.

The label was initially distributed by Ampex Records from 1970 to 1971, and then by Bell Records from 1972 to 1973. Morris sold the label to Atlantic Records in 1974, and became co-chairman of Atlantic. The label continued to operate as a subsidiary of Atlantic, until Atlantic shut the label down in 1980.

== See also ==
- List of record labels
