= Get Over It (MC Kinky song) =

Single by MC Kinky
- Released: 1991
- Recorded: 1991
- Length: 4:10 (video version); 5:46 (album version)
- Label: More Protein
- Songwriter: Caron Geary
- Producers: The Hand of Jesus; MC Kinky

MC Kinky singles chronology
"Everything Starts with an 'E'" (1990)	"Get Over It" (1991)	"Generations of Love" (1991)

Music video
- "Get Over It" on YouTube

"Get Over It" is the first solo single by English female raggamuffin toaster MC Kinky. It charted at number 95 on the UK Singles Chart after being featured on an episode of Channel 4's The Word.

== Background ==
"Get Over It" is MC Kinky's first solo single after featuring on E-Zee Possee's "Everything Starts with an 'E'". It was written by MC Kinky and produced by her and Boy George (operating under the name 'The Hand of Jesus') with one version being released which had Apollo 440 on remixing duties. It was released on More Protein, a vanity label established by Boy George because no-one would release "Everything Starts with an 'E'". The song was performed on the series 1 finale of Channel 4's The Word.

The following week, it made No. 95 on the UK Singles Chart. It would be her only solo entry on the UK Singles Chart under the name 'MC Kinky'. The song was not released on any album until 2009, when the song was re-issued on Feral on Kinky's album Girl with a Halo 2 as "So Over It".

According to Boy George's autobiography, things got heated between George and Kinky during the production of "Get Over It" due to Kinky's fastidiousness in controlling every aspect of her records, her refusal to listen to external opinions, and readiness in blaming others for mistakes: "No matter who she collaborated with, within hours they were labelled wankers."

== Music video ==
A music video was produced for the song at a length of 4:10 in which MC Kinky raps along to the song, and can be seen topless. Assorted shots of breakdancers and drummers are seen. Parts of the music video were shot in Boy George's house in Hampstead.

== Critical reception ==
Blues & Soul rated the song 7/10, and described it as "another one of those records that you try your real bestest to reject on the grounds of terminal insanity and total irrelevance", noting the reviewer's failure to do so and commending its "jolly catchy chorus".

== Charts ==
Chart (1991)	Peak position
UK Singles (OCC)	95
UK Dance (Music Week)	42
