= The Martyr Mantras =

Studio album by Jesus Loves You
- Released: 3 September 1990
- Recorded: 1988−90
- Genre: Balearic beat; neo soul; acid house
- Label: More Protein/Virgin
- Producer: Simon Rogers; Mark Brydon; Angela Dust; Jon Moss; John Themis; Bobby Z; Jeremy Healy; Bruce Forest; Zeo

Jesus Loves You chronology
High Hat (1989)	'''The Martyr Mantras''' (1990)	Cheapness and Beauty (1995)

Singles from The Martyr Mantras
- 1. "After the Love" Released: 1989; 2. "One on One" Released: 1990; 3. "Bow Down Mister/Love Hurts" Released: 11 February 1991; 4. "Generations of Love" Released: 1991

The Martyr Mantras is the only studio album by Jesus Loves You and the fourth overall studio album by Boy George. It was credited to Jesus Loves You worldwide except in North America, where it was credited to Boy George upon its release there in 1991.

== Composition ==
The Martyr Mantras contains many dance-orientated tracks, most of them with an electronic production. It is partly a collection of some of the songs that were released as one-off singles many months before ("No Clause 28" in 1988, "After the Love" in 1989, "Generations of Love" and "One on One" in 1990). The lead single was the Indian and house mash-up "Bow Down Mister" which reached the top 30 of the UK Singles Chart.

George's songwriting credits are also under another alias, as Angela Dust.

== Critical reception ==
Professional ratings
Review scores
Source	Rating
AllMusic	link
Calgary Herald	B
Entertainment Weekly	(favorable)
Melody Maker	(mixed)
Music & Media	(favorable)
NME	6/10
Record Mirror	7/10

In a contemporaneous review in Keyboard, Jim Aikin described the album as "blue-eyed soul for the '90s". He added that "[George] updates his British R&B roots very effectively with hip-hop beats and techno tricks". Aikin also noted that, whatever the mood of any particular track, "you feel that George is sincere". Dave Obee from Calgary Herald remarked that the former head of the Culture Club "has turned to house music, with all the computerized repetition a listener can stand. But that wonderfully pure voice rises above the rigid format, giving real life to each song." He highlighted George's "husky singing" on "Love's Gonna Let U Down", and his "stirring work" on "I Specialize in Loneliness". Andrew Smith from Melody Maker wrote, "With the first two singles, the gorgeously melancholic "Generations of Love" and "One on One", George seemed to be demanding for the first time, to be taken seriously as an artist, and with great success. [...] If anyone ever doubted it, songs like the aforementioned singles, the gritty "Love's Gonna Let U Down" and lingering devastation of "I Specialize in Loneliness" establish beyond doubt that George O'Dowd still possesses one of the finest soul voices we've got."

In a retrospective review for AllMusic, William Ruhlmann found the music to be "largely anonymous, if danceable", but singled out "Bow Down Mister" as an exception.

== Commercial performance ==
The Martyr Mantras was not a strong seller, only reaching #60 on the UK Albums Chart. Although it did fare better in European countries, The Martyr Mantras failed to enter the US Billboard Top 200.

== Track listing ==
1. "Generations of Love" (Oakenfold mix) (Angela Dust, Caron Geary, Simon Rogers) - 7:12
2. "One on One" (Brydon L.P. mix) (Dust, Mark Brydon) - 4:41
3. "Love's Gonna Let U Down" (Popcorn mix) (Dust, Brydon) - 6:08
4. "After the Love" (Ten Glorious Years mix) (Dust, Jon Moss) - 7:41
5. "I Specialise in Loneliness" (Dust, John Themis) - 6:24
6. "No Clause 28" (Pascal Gabriel mix) (Boy George O'Dowd, Glenn Nightingale, Ian Maidman, Richie Stevens, Steve Fletcher) - 6:20
7. "Love Hurts" (L.P. mix) (Dust, Bruce Forest, Richard Cottle) - 6:29
8. "Siempre Te Amare" (Dust) - 6:07
9. "Too Much Love" (Dust, Brydon) - 6:00
10. "Bow Down Mister" (Dust) - 6:32
11. "Generations of Love" (seventies mix) (CD only)

== Personnel ==
- Boy George – vocals
- Jonathan Quarmby, Richard Cottle – keyboards
- Colin Elliot – percussion
- Jagdeep Singh – tabla
- Simeon Lister – saxophone
- Beverley Skeete, Derek Green, The Govinda All Stars, Helen Terry, Jacqui McKoy, Jagdeep Singh, Juliet Roberts, London Community Gospel Choir, Sharon McKoy, Stefan Ashton Frank – vocals

Production

- Simon Rogers – producer (track 1 & 11)
- Mark Brydon – producer (tracks 2 & 3)
- Angela Dust – producer (tracks 4 & 9)
- Jon Moss – producer (track 4)
- John Themis – producer (track 5)
- Bobby Z – producer (track 6)
- Jeremy Healy – producer (track 6)
- Bruce Forest – producer (tracks 7 & 10)
- Zeo – producer (track 8)

== Charts ==
Chart (1990–91)	Peak position
Australian Albums (ARIA Charts)	136
Austrian Albums (Ö3 Austria)	13
German Albums (Offizielle Top 100)	44
UK Albums (OCC)	60
