= Everything Starts with an 'E' =

- UK CD single

Single by E-Zee Possee featuring MC Kinky

from the album The Bone Dance
- Released: 31 July 1989; 5 March 1990 (re-issue)
- Recorded: 1989
- Genre: Acid house
- Length: 3:38 (single version); 7:13 (12" version)
- Label: More Protein
- Songwriters: Angela Dust; Caron Geary; Simon Rogers
- Producers: Jeremy Healy; Simon Rogers

E-Zee Possee singles chronology
"Everything Starts with an 'E'" (1989)	"Love On Love (E-Zee Possee ft. Dr. Mouthquake)" (1990)

Music video
- "Everything Starts With An 'E'" on YouTube

E-Zee Possee singles chronology
"Love On Love" (1990)	"Everything Starts with an 'E'" (1990)	"The Sun Machine" (1990)

"Everything Starts with an 'E'" is a song by English electronic music group E-Zee Possee featuring vocals from MC Kinky. It is considered by many to be the anthem of the acid house movement of the late 1980s, with the "E" in the title widely understood to refer to the drug Ecstasy (MDMA).

The song began life as an instrumental interpretation of Jeremy Healy and Simon Rogers's idea of house music after a trip to Ibiza which upon being presented to Boy George had vocals added to it by MC Kinky, George and Eve Gallagher. This vocal version charted number 15 on the UK Singles Chart, and although a music video was created, it was rarely broadcast due to its controversial lyrical content.

== Background ==
E-Zee-Possee was a group compiled by Jeremy Healy of Haysi Fantayzee fame. It uses a different vocalist for each record owing to his experiences producing the Business Mix of Boy George's "Live My Life" with extra vocals with street rapper MC Cyndee.

"Everything Starts with an 'E'" was initially produced as an instrumental dance record with assorted samples by Jimi Hendrix, Lost in Space and from classical music. It was written by Healy immediately after his first trip to Ibiza, where the acid house movement was in full swing, as Healy's and Rogers' interpretation of house music at the time having taken heavy inspiration from the music being played there.

The title, "Everything Starts with an 'E'", originated from a Ronald McDonald LP which contained the line and was sampled in the song. Healy then presented it to Boy George, who suggested they use MC Kinky, a white female raggamuffin toaster who had previously featured on his song Kipsy. She then used the song to write what according to her was an anti-drug rant. Boy George and Eve Gallagher both provide backing vocals for the record.

It was rejected by every label George went to and eventually he opted to front the money himself, pressing a thousand copies with the intent to get it played in the clubs. Its first play was in the Hacienda in Manchester. After becoming a theme for many of the raves, Virgin Records surrendered and signed the band. Although BBC Radio 1 initially banned the song due to controversial lyrical content, it was performed on the Sky1 show Hits International, and later charted at #15 on the UK Singles Chart.

It remained the flagship for George's More Protein label as well as an anthem for the entire acid house movement of the late 1980s. It later appeared on E-Zee Possee's album The Bone Dance alongside follow-up singles "Love On Love", "The Sun Machine" and "Breathing Is E-Zee" as well as on Now That's What I Call Music! 17. After the earlier ban, the song was played on BBC stations at various times in 2010 and later.

== Critical reception ==
In 1990, Dave Jennings from Melody Maker commented, "The nannies, cowards and puritans at the BBC want to deprive you from this delight; it's been banned from Top of the Pops and given minimal Radio 1 exposure. Thankfully, the censors seem to have been overcome — because this devastating dance trance is already beating up the Top 20. [...] MC Kinky spins her twisting take, there are soulful choruses of "ecstacy!" and resistance is useless. Big, baggy and brilliant."

The same year, David Giles from Music Week wrote, "Third release of a track that's been popular in clubs but has, as yet, failed to ignite the public's imagination. Not on patch on their recent "Love On Love" single; it obeys the golden rules of house too closely, right down to the chants of "ecstacy" (drug references will of course be fervently denied). Already in the 40, though, so expect a big hit this time round." On the 1996 release, the magazine gave it three out of five.

In March 1989, William Shaw from Smash Hits called it a "silly record", and "a piece of what used to be called "Acid House", with a rampant drum machine rhythm, a completely unhinged bit of reggae rapping, the wholesale theft of the odd piece of Michael Jackson, and a frantic bit of guitar squalling nicked off a record by an old deceased bloke called Jimi Hendrix." Looking back in 2001, Simon Cantlon of AllMusic gave the song a negative review, noting that the song "had not aged well" although conceded that the track "is considered a classic by some".

== Promotion and release ==
"Everything Starts with an 'E'" was originally released on 31 July 1989, and peaked at number 69 on the UK Singles Chart, leaving the top 75 chart after only one week. The single was re-released on 5 March 1990, and climbed to number 15 on the UK chart. It remained in the chart for eight weeks, making it the longest chart running for the band.

A music video was made for the song after the song cracked the top 20. Despite this, the band were not allowed on Top of the Pops to promote it, and the song was not broadcast at the time on music video channels. It features MC Kinky rapping to the song as well as Marc Massive and George Long dancing alongside her.

When the song achieved mainstream success, MC Kinky didn't have a manager or an agent, and as such received many calls to her landline requesting that she perform somewhere. These performances often took place in obscure locations off the M25 motorway around London, at acid house raves with "hundreds of thousands" of attendees. She recalled that she often had to curl her hair in the car and put on reflective clothing inside pub toilets, and that "when the screechy guitar on 'Everything ... ' began, the crowd would roar like a football stadium." Once she had performed, she used to start dancing inside the crowd, during which she would find herself bombarded with people claiming that she had changed their lives.

== Track listing ==
=== PROCD 1 ===
1. "Everything Starts with an 'E'" (Edit) – 3:36
2. "Everything Starts with an 'E'" (12" Mix) – 7:10
3. "Everything Starts with an 'E'" (Sir Frederick Leighton Remix) – 7:49
4. "Everything Starts with an 'E'" (Beats) – 6:47

=== PROT112 ===
1. "Everything Starts with an 'E'" (Renegade Soundwave Mix) – 5:23
2. "Everything Starts with an 'E'" (Renegade Soundwave Dub) – 3:27

=== PROTR112 ===
1. "Everything Starts with an 'E'" (New 12" Mix) – 7:13
2. "Everything Starts with an 'E'" (Instrumental) – 5:18

== Chart positions ==
Chart performance for "Everything Starts with an 'E'"
Chart (1989–1990)	Peak position
Australia (ARIA)	120
Europe (Eurochart Hot 100)	39
Israel (Israeli Singles Chart)	2
Luxembourg (Radio Luxembourg)	11
UK Singles (Official Charts)	15

1996 chart performance for "Everything Starts with an 'E'"
Chart (1996)	Peak position
Spain (PROMUSICAE)	6
UK Dance (Official Charts)	11

== Release history ==
Release history and formats for "Everything Starts with an 'E'"
Country	Date	Label	Format	Catalogue number
UK	31 July 1989	More Protein/Virgin Records	compact disc	PROT 1
UK	31 July 1989	More Protein/Virgin Records	maxi single	PROCD 1
