= John Wayne Is Big Leggy =

Single by Haysi Fantayzee

from the album Battle Hymns For Children Singing
- B-side: "The Sabres of Paradise"
- Released: 1982
- Recorded: 1982
- Length: 3:22
- Label: Regard
- Songwriter(s): Jeremy Healy; Kate Garner; Paul Caplin

Haysi Fantayzee singles chronology
"John Wayne Is Big Leggy" (1982)	"Holy Joe" (1982)

Music video
- "John Wayne Is Big Leggy" on YouTube

Audio
- "John Wayne Is Big Leggy" (Extended Version) on YouTube

"John Wayne Is Big Leggy" is the debut single by British music group Haysi Fantayzee, released in 1982. It peaked at number 13 on the Austrian Singles Chart, number 3 on the German Singles Chart, number 4 on the Swiss Singles Chart, and number 11 on the UK Singles Chart.

== Themes ==
The song was a combination of political satire and sexual humour, using nursery rhyme-style lyrics. The protagonist, John Wayne, is having sexual intercourse with a Native American female. When Wayne's bandolier restricts their intimacy, she suggests he remove it. He refuses and suggests he sodomize her instead.

This surreal image is intended as a comment on the treatment of indigenous people during the European colonisation, and was written after Jeremy Healy read Bury My Heart at Wounded Knee by historian Dee Brown. Wayne represents the European colonist, while his partner is the Native American people.

It was an allegory for treatment of which the white settlers used, but on the Native American Indians. However, I wrote it like John Wayne having anal sex with a squaw. I thought this was hilarious!

— Jeremy Healy of Haysi Fantayzee

Unusually for a song with explicit sexual content in the 1980s, the song escaped being banned from broadcast by the BBC, was playlisted on BBC Radio 1, and the band performed the song twice on Top of the Pops and on Saturday morning children's television. The song, with its "Shotgun, gimme gimme lowdown fun, boy! Okay, yeah, showdown!" intro, was taken to be a nonsensical novelty song about cowboys.

People kept saying we were writing nonsense lyrics, but we didn't explain anything, because if they knew, it wouldn't get played.

— Kate Garner of Haysi Fantayzee

== Critical reception ==
Professional ratings
Review scores
Source	Rating
Bravo	3/5 stars

The single was well received in the British and European music press. Smash Hits described it as a Wild West shoot-out between Madness, Bow Wow Wow and Altered Images. Stewart Mason of AllMusic wrote, "it all sounds like an enormous put-on, but it's an entertaining one for anyone with a taste for early '80s ephemera." The song was listed in Smash Hits' top 10 lyrics of the 80s.

Boy George, who had been a schoolfriend of Jeremy Healy and a fellow Blitz club regular, spoke of his jealousy of Haysi Fantayzee's success:

To add to the depression, Haysi Fantayzee's debut single, "John Wayne Is Big Leggy," was being played on Radio One. It became the soundtrack to my despair, slowly climbing the charts and staying there for ten weeks, niggling at my psyche. I knew it was a good record too. Clever, original, and very annoying. I wanted to retire when I saw the video on Saturday-morning kids' TV. I couldn't believe they had a video and we didn't.

— Boy George, Take It Like a Man

== Track listing ==
7-inch version
No.	Title	Length
1.	"John Wayne Is Big Leggy"	3:18
2.	"The Sabres of Paradise"	6:38

12-inch version
No.	Title	Length
1.	"John Wayne Is Big Leggy"	6:55
2.	"The Sabres of Paradise"	6:38

== Charts ==
=== Weekly charts ===
Chart (1982–1983)	Peak position
Austria (Ö3 Austria Top 40)	13
Switzerland (Schweizer Hitparade)	4
UK Singles (OCC)	11
West Germany (GfK)	3

=== Year-end charts ===
Chart (1983)	Position
West Germany (Official German Charts)	31
