= Breathing Is E-Zee =

Single by E-Zee Possee featuring Tara Newley

from the album The Bone Dance
- Released: 1991
- Genre: Electronic; trip hop
- Length: 3:49
- Label: More Protein
- Lyricist(s): Jeremy Healy; Tara Newley; Tommy Danvers
- Producer(s): Jeremy Healy; Tommy Danvers

E-Zee Possee featuring Tara Newley singles chronology
"The Sun Machine" (1990)	"Breathing Is E-Zee" (1991)

Music video
- "Breathing Is E-Zee" on YouTube

Breathing Is E-Zee is a song by English electronic music group E-Zee Possee, featuring the vocals of English writer, broadcaster, and producer Tara Newley. It was released in 1991 by More Protein as the fourth single from their only album, The Bone Dance (1992). Newley co-wrote the lyrics with its producers, Jeremy Healy and Tommy Danvers. The song peaked at number 72 on the UK Singles Chart, number 60 on the Music Week Dance Singles chart and number 59 on the UK Club Chart.

== Critical reception ==
Pan-European magazine Music & Media wrote, "Featuring soulful vocalist Tara Newley, this modern dance tune breathes the old Stax rhythm 'n blues sound in a Sly & Robbie type of production. The influence of Deee-Lite is e-zee to identify as well. Smoking!"

== Track listing ==
- 7-inch single (1991, UK)

A. "Breathing Is E-Zee" (Radio Edit) – 3:45
AA. "Breathing Is E-Zee" (Instrumental) – 5:35

- 12-inch vinyl (1991, UK)

A. "Breathing Is E-Zee" (I'm Going Home With This One Mix) – 8:08
AA. "Breathing Is E-Zee" (Delicious Proportions Mix) – 7:12

- CD single (1991, UK)
1. "Breathing Is E-Zee" (Radio Edit) – 3:49
2. "Breathing Is E-Zee" (Delicious Proportions Mix) – 7:14
3. "Everything Starts with an 'E'" (Renegade Soundwave Dub) – 3:29

== Personnel ==
=== E-Zee Possee ===
- Jeremy Healy - production, mixing, keyboards, bass, drums
- Simon Rogers - engineering, keyboards

=== Featured musicians ===
- Tara Newley - vocals
- Shawn Lee - guitars

== Charts ==
Chart (1991)	Peak Position
UK Singles (OCC)	72
UK Dance (Music Week)	60
UK Club Chart (Record Mirror)	59
