= Battle Hymns for Children Singing =

Studio album by Haysi Fantayzee
- Released: 1983
- Genres: New wave; synth-pop
- Length: 37:35 (original release)
- Label: Regard
- Producers: Steve Brown; Paul Caplin; Vic Coppersmith; Tony Visconti; Alan Winstanley

Professional ratings
Review scores
Source	Rating
AllMusic	2.5/5 stars
Trouser Press	(negative)

Battle Hymns for Children Singing is the debut and sole studio album by the short-lived English new wave band Haysi Fantayzee, released in 1983 by Regard Records.

== Content ==
The album features two UK Top 20 singles: "John Wayne Is Big Leggy" (UK No. 11) and "Shiny Shiny" (UK No. 16). The singles "Holy Joe" (UK No. 51) and "Sister Friction" (UK No. 62) weren't included on the original release of the album but were added to a 2000 CD release in the United States, which also includes remixes and B-sides as bonus tracks. A 2007 CD release by Cherry Pop, retitled The Very Best of Haysi Fantayzee, but otherwise featuring similar track listing and artwork to the original album, also includes "Holy Joe" and "Sister Friction" as well as remixes and B-sides as bonus tracks.

== Track listing ==
All tracks are written by Paul Caplin, Kate Garner and Jeremy Healy, except where noted.

Original LP & cassette
No.	Title	Writer(s)	Length
1.	"Shiny Shiny"		3:40
2.	"I Lost My Dodi"		3:15
3.	"More Money"		3:04
4.	"Jimmy Jive Jive"		3:32
5.	"The Sabres of Paradise"		6:50
6.	"Shoofly Love"		3:38
7.	"Make Me a Sinner"		1:40
8.	"Chizoola"	Caplin; Garner; Healy; Marc Bolan	4:32
9.	"John Wayne Is Big Leggy"		3:22
10.	"Here Comes the Beast"		4:02
Total length:			37:35

2000 US CD edition
No.	Title	Writer(s)	Length
1.	"Shiny Shiny"		3:43
2.	"I Lost My Dodi"		3:16
3.	"More Money"		3:06
4.	"Jimmy Jive Jive"		3:33
5.	"The Sabres of Paradise"		6:56
6.	"Sister Friction"		3:05
7.	"Shoofly Love"		5:09
8.	"Chizoola"	Caplin; Garner; Healy; Bolan	4:33
9.	"John Wayne Is Big Leggy"		3:22
10.	"Here Comes the Beast"		4:03
11.	"Holy Joe"		3:04
12.	"OK Big Daddy"		1:54
13.	"John Wayne Is Big Leggy" (Groovy Long Version)		6:55
14.	"Holy Joe" (12" Single Remix)		4:34
15.	"Shiny Shiny Dance"		5:16
16.	"Shiny Shiny Bon Temps"		3:28
17.	"Sister Friction" (12" Single Remix)		6:25

2007 Cherry Pop CD release – The Very Best of Haysi Fantayzee
No.	Title	Writer(s)	Length
1.	"Shiny Shiny"		3:42
2.	"I Lost My Dodi"		3:16
3.	"More Money"		3:06
4.	"Jimmy Jive Jive"		3:32
5.	"The Sabres of Paradise"		7:02
6.	"Sister Friction"		3:05
7.	"Shoofly Love"		5:10
8.	"Chizoola"	Caplin; Garner; Healy; Bolan	4:33
9.	"John Wayne Is Big Leggy"		3:21
10.	"Here Comes the Beast"		3:42
11.	"Holy Joe"		3:02
12.	"OK Big Daddy"		1:52
13.	"John Wayne Is Big Leggy" (Groovy Long Version)		6:57
14.	"Holy Joe" (Remix)		4:31
15.	"Shiny Shiny" (Dance Mix)		4:35
16.	"Sister Friction" (Extended Remix)		6:24
17.	"Jimmy Jive" (Instrumental)		4:45
18.	"Shiny Shiny" (Bon Temps)		3:22

Note

- On the CD versions, "Make Me a Sinner" is joined onto the end of the same track as "Shoofly Love" and is uncredited.

== Personnel ==
Adapted from AllMusic.

=== Musicians ===
Haysi Fantayzee

- Jeremy Healy – primary vocals
- Kate Garner – primary vocals
- Paul Caplin – keyboards

Additional musicians

- Afrodiziak – background vocals
- Alfie Agius – bass guitar
- Big George – bass guitar
- Kevin Bird – guitar
- Andy Duncan – percussion
- Simon Henri – saxophone
- Robbie McIntosh – guitar
- John Sherwood – guitar
- Dick Simpson – guitar
- Bobby Valentino – violin
- Tony Visconti – guitar

=== Production ===
- Steve Brown – producer
- Paul Caplin – arranger, producer, programming
- Vic Coppersmith – producer
- Elliott Federman – mastering
- Simon Fowler – photography
- Bruce Harris – liner notes
- David Richman – production coordination
- Graham Smith – original graphics
- David Thomas – animation
- Vincent M. Vero – compilation producer
- Tony Visconti – producer
- Alan Winstanley – producer

== Charts ==
Chart (1983)	Peak position
Australian Albums Chart	48
German Albums Chart	40
UK Albums Chart	53
