= Shiny Shiny =

1983 song by Haysi Fantayzee

Single by Haysi Fantayzee

from the album Battle Hymns for Children Singing
- B-side: "Shiny Shiny (Bon Temps)"
- Released: January 1983 (UK)
- Recorded: 1982
- Genre: New wave
- Length: 3:42
- Label: Regard; RCA
- Songwriters: Jeremy Healy; Kate Garner; Paul Caplin

Haysi Fantayzee singles chronology
"Sister Friction" (1983)	"Shiny Shiny" (1983)

Music video
- "Shiny Shiny" on YouTube

"Shiny Shiny" is a 1983 new wave song by the British pop band Haysi Fantayzee. It is an anti-nuclear war song with humorous, nonsensical lyrics about war, politics, and violence, among other issues, which includes instruments such as a piano, fiddles, violins, and spoons, along with audio sound effects, loops, and a bouncy country music-like beat. The song peaked at No. 16 in the United Kingdom and reached the top three in Australia. It also charted in Germany, New Zealand and the United States, where it became the band's only hit single to chart on the Billboard Hot 100, peaking at No. 74. The music video for the song also got some airplay on MTV and other music related shows and channels when it was first released. In addition, the song was performed on Top of the Pops.

== Charts ==
=== Weekly charts ===
Weekly chart performance for "Shiny Shiny"
Chart (1983)	Peak position
Australia (Kent Music Report)	3
New Zealand (Recorded Music NZ)	37
UK Singles (OCC)	16
US Billboard Hot 100	74
West Germany (GfK)	22

=== Year-end charts ===
Year-end chart performance for "Shiny Shiny"
Chart (1983)	Position
Australia (Kent Music Report)	48
