= Tallulah (DJ) =

British DJ, record producer and club promoter (1948–2008)

DJ Tallulah
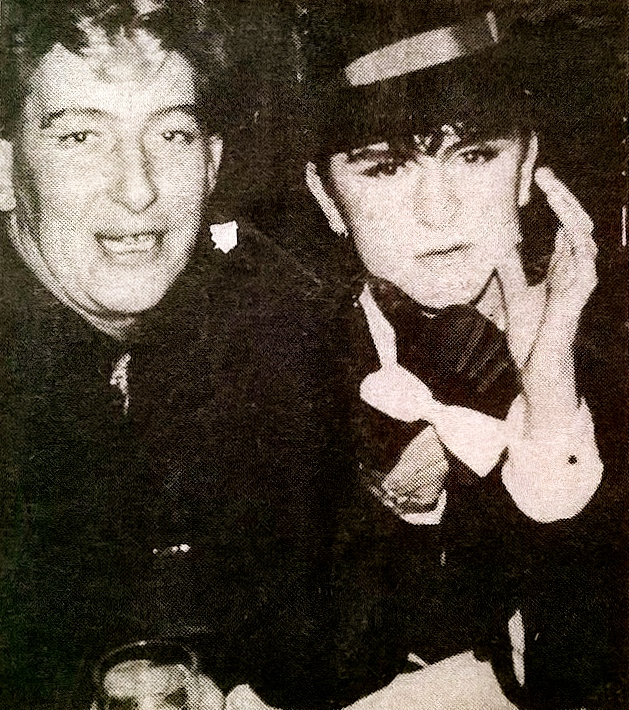
- Tallulah (left) with Steve Strange in 1983

Background information
- Born: Martyn Allam; 1948; Hamburg, Germany
- Died: 28 March 2008 (aged 59–60) Ladbroke Grove, London, England
- Genres: House; disco; dance; R&B
- Occupation: DJ
- Instrument: Turntable
- Years active: 1972–2008
- Label: 99 Degrees

Martyn Allam (1948 – 28 March 2008), known professionally as Tallulah, was a German-born, London-based, British DJ, recording artist, producer, and club promoter. Tallulah's music career spanned from 1972 until his death in 2008.

Tallulah was at the heart of London's club scene for more than 40 years, 35 years of those as a DJ, alternative performer, club and bar promoter, and personality. His lifestyle and career linked him to figures such as playwright Joe Orton and Orton's partner, actor Kenneth Williams and DJ Kenny Everett. His career also included jobs as a restaurateur, and hotel manager.

== Family ==
Allam was born in 1948 in Hamburg to English parents. His father worked in the catering and hotel industry and was stationed in Hamburg after World War II to help with the Reclamation. His father's job in Hamburg involved helping to re-establish a hotel. After living in Hamburg for three years, Allam travelled to the UK with his grandmother, where he remained living. When his parents returned to the UK to live permanently, Allam rejoined them. The family moved to nearby Barnehurst in north-west Kent. Just before Allam joined primary school the family relocated again, this time to Maidstone where he spent most of his childhood and early adolescence.

At the age of fifteen, Allam attended catering college (East Kent College) in Broadstairs. His early interest in music and fashion stemmed from this era: "It would be ’66. I was well into music by then. Those towns and London were very mod influenced. You know what it’s like being brought up in the suburbs: for you to make a statement, you put yourself up for criticism in the way you dress, especially during the ’60s." The first record Allam purchased was Then He Kissed Me by the Crystals (1963), which he bought from a record store in Maidstone. The first vinyl album he bought, I Put A Spell On You by Nina Simone (1965), was from HMV record store in Oxford Street, London.

The initial moment Allam came face to face with his sexuality was when his parents sent him to ballroom dance classes at the Palace Theatre in Maidstone: "Not the best thing to do with a son who’s slightly fey."

Allam became fashion conscious during his early days at college but, as his finances were limited by being a student, in order to look fashionable he resorted to making his own outfits. He would buy Simplicity Patterns and purchase material from a market stall and cut and stitch the clothes himself, but make them tighter than usual. By his late teens, Allam was tall, over 6 ft 2 in, skinny and admitted to being flamboyant. By this time he already knew he was gay, and immersed himself in London's underground homosexual scene and nightlife. As such he came into contact with many closeted gay famous personalities.

It was in Canterbury at the Queens Head pub that Allam first met the pirate radio DJ Tom Edwards. Edwards was a DJ on Radio City (a key pirate radio station). They became lifelong friends. It was Edwards that christened Allam 'Tallulah' on a Sunday night at a pub in Herne Bay. The name stuck.

After Allam's studies at college ended he took a job at the Cora Hotel in Upper Woburn Place in Bloomsbury, London, which he eventually managed.

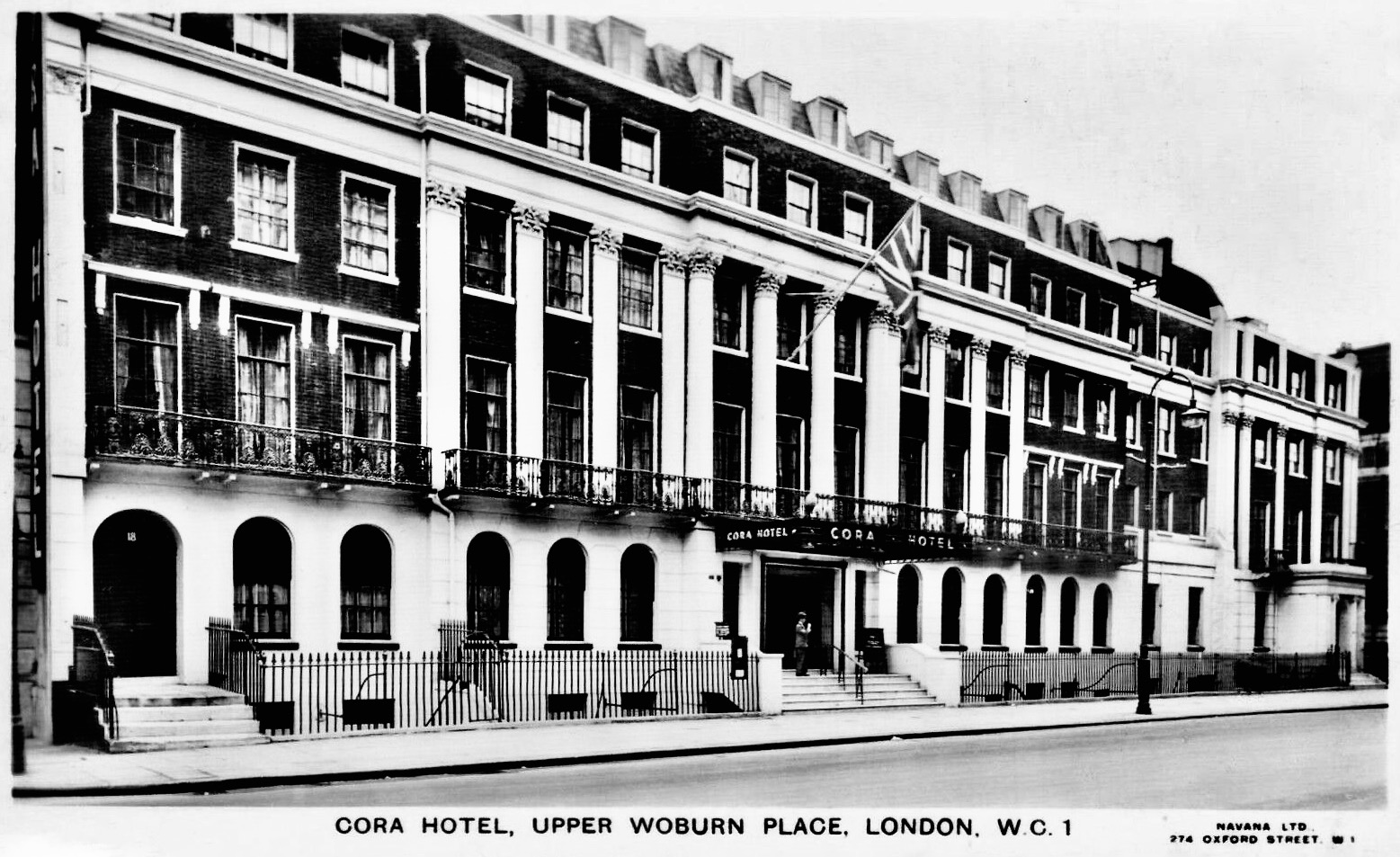
Cora Hotel, Bloomsbury, London.

It was at this hotel that he first met the actor Kenneth Williams who lived in an apartment opposite the hotel. Allam would visit Williams at his apartment for tea, and Williams would sometimes rope Allam in to read his scripts with him, with Williams occasionally asking Allam for his opinion of them. Around this period, Allam also socialized with such nonconformist figures as Hugh Paddick, Joe Orton, Kenneth Halliwell, and Victor Spinetti, although Allam confessed there was no glamour involved in these acquaintances. Most of them were experiencing financial hardship and meetings usually took place over a glass of wine around the kitchen table in one of their apartments.

== Career ==
=== Early career ===
Tallulah started his DJ career in 1972 in a small club in Pimlico called the Escort. In between spinning discs his job also entailed acting as the coat-check, collecting empty glasses and keeping the toilets clean. The cabaret act at the club was Hinge & Bracket who went on to achieve huge fame and became a fixture on British TV with their own TV shows and national tours. During the early 1970s, the music played in gay clubs changed considerably due to American imports being readily available in several Soho record stores. British entrepreneur Jerry Collins was so impressed by Studio One, a gay disco in Los Angeles, that he returned to London determined to give the capital the same thing.

The gay disco BANG opened in 1976 at the Sundown (a former ballroom/dance hall) in the basement of the Astoria Theatre at 157 Charing Cross Road. During this embryonic period of London's gay club culture, Tallulah was still working full-time as a hotel manager as well as DJing most evenings. Tallulah became a resident DJ at BANG in 1976. It could be said that Tallullah was one of the originators of London's gay club scene as he was DJing at such seminal clubs as BANG and Scandals during the 1970s.

Tallulah recalled during an interview with Luke Howard in 2006 how the emergence of BANG in 1976 took London by storm, bringing night-clubbing to another level: "Everyone on the scene went to BANG, it appealed to all sorts of queens: leather queens, clones, twirlers and trolley dollies who'd come back from New York City and tell us what the hot tracks were over there. BANG was a major event on the scene. We had a phone in the DJ booth that linked to the lighting booth and we'd call up the engineer and tell him to do a black out at the next break, or when to use the strobe effects or do a balloon drop. There was also a huge cinema screen at the back, as the Sundown [Astoria] was a converted cinema, and we'd show Busby Berkeley dance routines from all the old Hollywood musicals." BANG was the UK's first mega gay club. It was founded by Jack Barrie (manager of the Marquee Club in Soho) and disc jockey Gary London (aka Gerry Collins) who worked as an engineer at the Marquee Recording Studios. The club ran on Monday evenings.

The resident DJ's at BANG were Gary London, Tallulah and Norman Scott. "The minute it came on the scene, it was a huge hit," recalled Tallulah. "The queues! It went right round past 100 Club." Its instant success prompted the founders to open a second night weekly on Thursdays. The club attracted the likes of Andy Warhol and his entourage, Rudolph Nureyev, Rock Hudson, Elton John, actors, pop stars, film directors and London's fashionista. Its 1,000-plus capacity took for the first time gay clubbing in the UK into the mainstream. 1976 was also when the first commercially available 12 inch recordings became available, which were ideal for a club like BANG.

=== Relocation to New York ===
In 1977, Tallulah visited New York where he remained for over a year. It was whilst he was living in New York that he worked at the renowned club Studio 54 behind the bar and operating the lights in the lighting rig (not as a DJ). He did, however, get his Cinderella moment one night and stood in for a DJ that did not turn up for work due to sickness. When asked later in life about dance music culture, Tallulah said: "The rave lifestyle of Ibiza in the late '80s was just a vanilla version of the New York gay lifestyle of the '70s."

When Tallulah first went to Studio 54 in New York, he literally fell at the feet of the owner of the club Steve Rubell. 'I'd moved to New York for 18 months, where I worked at Studio 54. The first time I went there I fell over the velvet rope and landed at Steve Rubell's feet and when I stood up I asked him for a job. He put me behind the bar for a while and I stayed for 3 months and probably DJ’ed there about nine times until I got a summer season DJ residency at The Sandpiper on Fire Island.

=== New York Shooting ===
One night whilst Tallulah was living in New York he was on his way to the Anvil Club when he was shot and passed out. In hospital, nurses found in his arm a pellet dipped in horse tranquilliser. In later years Tallulah would boast, 'I was the first K tragedy.'

=== Return to London ===
Upon his return to London, Allam found himself homeless and moved into the Notting Hill apartment of the pop musician Iain 'Rudi' Williams, who later became one-half of the pop duo Big Bang.

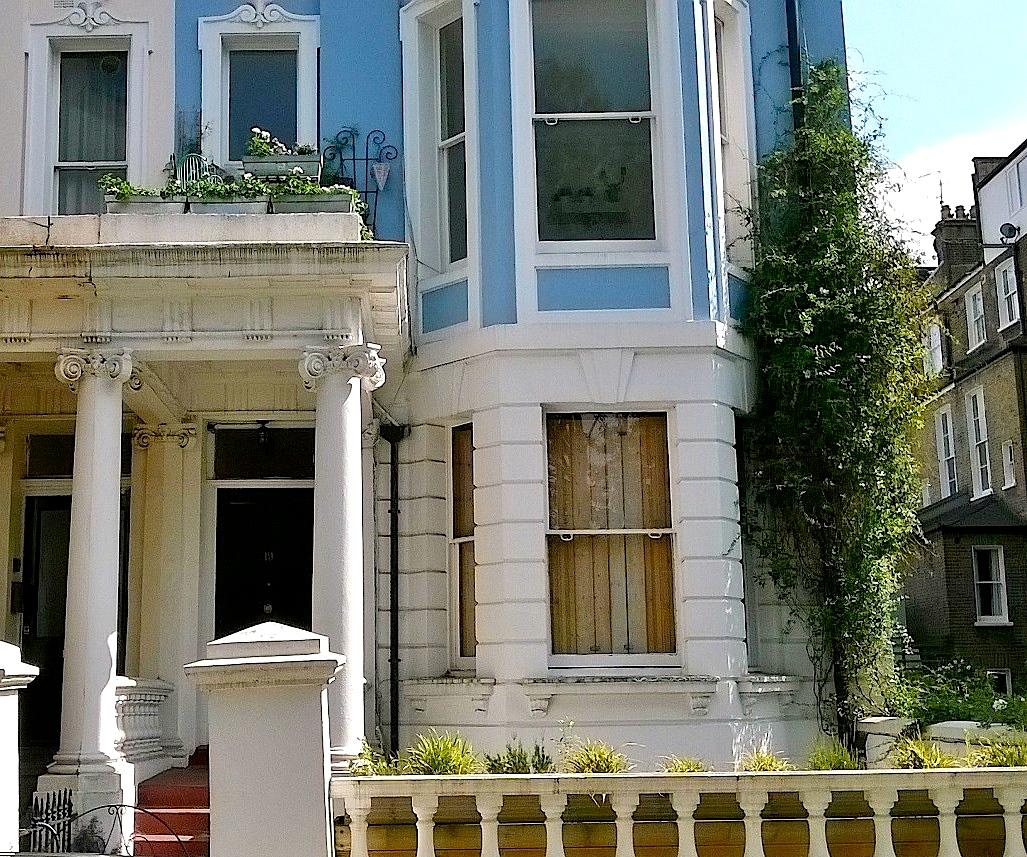
Williams' former apartment in Colville Terrace, Notting Hll Gate

Also living at the apartment was Williams's friend Granville King who also happened to be Allam's friend, hence the connection. It was Granville (unbeknown to Williams) that allowed Allam to stay temporarily at the apartment while Williams was away. When Williams returned to the UK after a visit abroad, Allam was still staying at Williams’ apartment. Allam remained as a guest at the apartment for over 10 years. Granville was a hairdresser and owned Tallulah Hairdressing Salon in Coram Street, Bloomsbury, (which was named after Tallulah) and was also an alternative cabaret/drag artiste named Gina King, who went on to win the Porchester Hall Drag Ball one year in the late-70s. Tallulah, Granville and Williams labeled themselves ‘The Colville Set,’ in a nod to the former artistic 'Bloomsbury Set' and after the bohemian district of Colville in Notting Hill in which they resided.

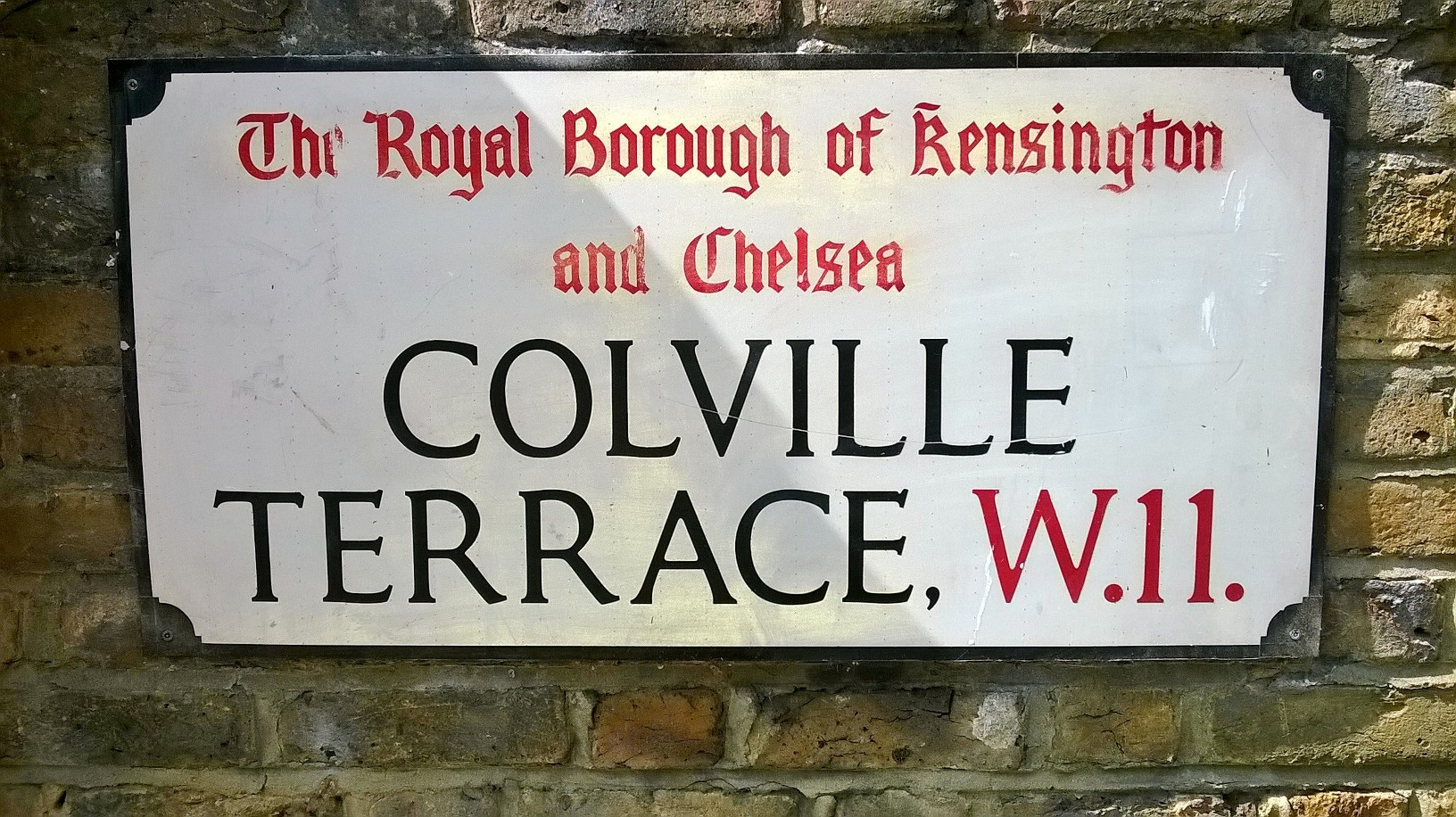
Colville Terrace, Notting Hill Gate

Many actors, writers and musicians lived in the area, including the writer Charles Glass, and musician Steven Luscombe of the band Blancmange who had apartments in the same house as Iain Williams, and their next-door neighbour actor Bette Bourne, and further along Colville Terrace the actor Philip Sayer. After returning from America Tallulah found the disco scene in London had really gotten big; "When I came back from New York the disco scene was peaking and it was easy for me to get work. When I had the residency at Scandals (which meant playing 6 nights a week) they gave me a record allowance of £70 a week, which was a fortune in those days, so I was able to buy all the American and European imports I wanted." In the late 1970s, ‘The Embassy was London's little Studio 54', said Tallulah, during an interview. "The gay night, Sunday night, was the nearest to a chic club that London ever got. The music was great, and Greg James was a great DJ." Tallulah DJ'd at the Embassy Club every Sunday on the gay nights. He would arrive at the club wearing one of his mother's cocktail dresses, with big boots on.

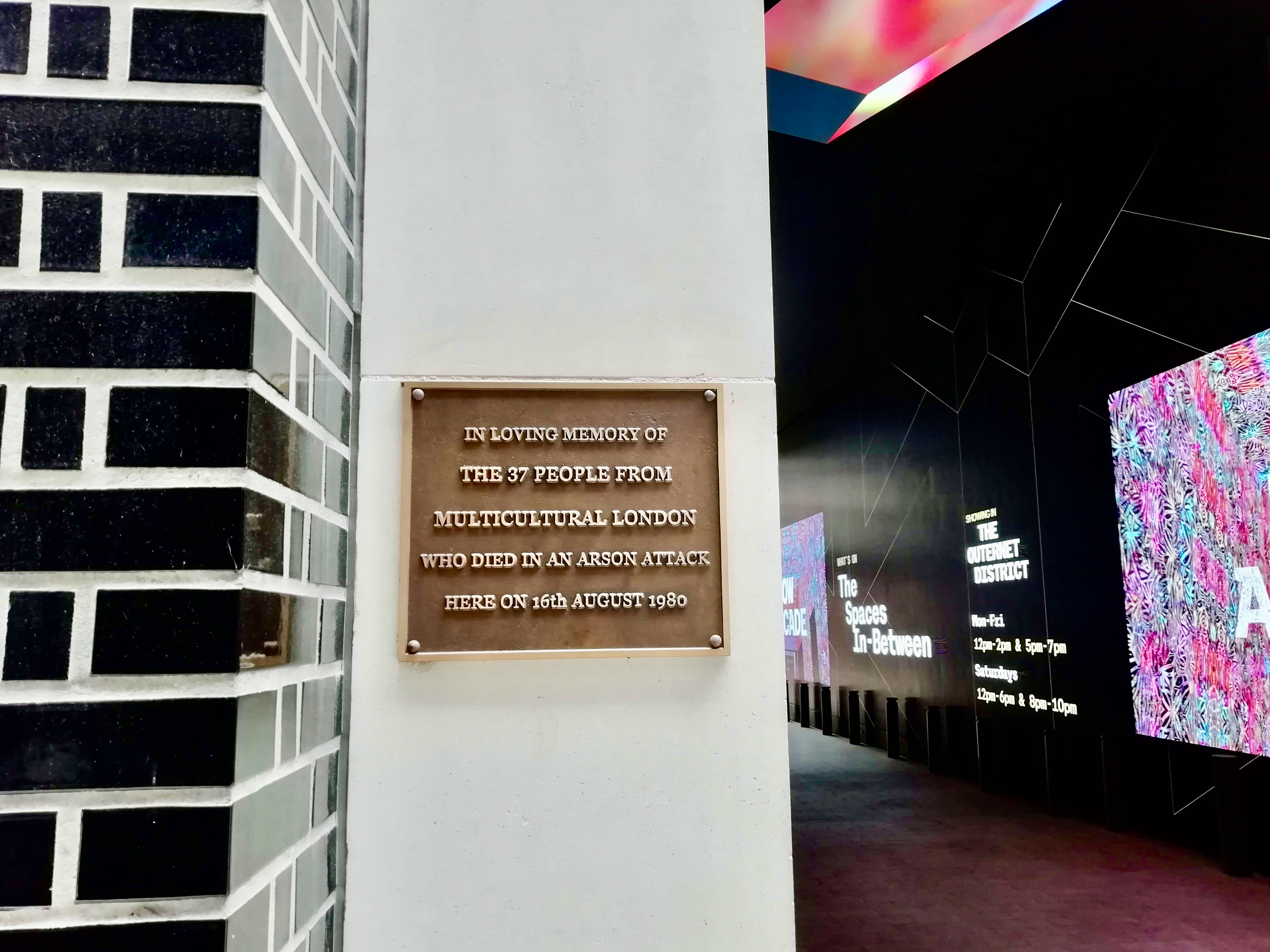
The Denmark Place fire Plaque honouring the 37 people who lost their lives in an arson attack, 16 August 1980

At the end of the 1970s, Tallulah was involved in the brief roller disco craze where he DJ'ed at the Electric Ballroom in Camden Town on a Tuesday night, which was the gay night. Tallulah later said: "There was a similar black disco in Shepherd's Bush and gangs started coming down to us because we were just frothy. They had to put a cage at the entrance, where people were searched. One night a guy jumped on the stage and held a knife to my neck. Then I had a fire extinguisher thrown at me."

In the early hours of the morning on 16 August 1980, Tallulah, having finished DJing for the evening at 3:00 am, decided to go for a drink at the Spanish Rooms [an unlicensed bar] at 18 Denmark Place, London, where a party was being held. He arrived just after the Fire Brigade arrived and witnessed the fire that claimed the lives of 37 people and injured many more.

On 13 November 1983, Tallulah opened his own club night, Circus Circus, at Studio Valbonne in Kingly Street, Soho, London. Many celebrities attended the opening night including Steve Strange, April Ashley, Yvette the Conqueror and Vicky de Lambray.

In late 1983, Tallulah suggested to Iain Williams that Williams should record a dance version of the song 'Love is Suicide', which Williams had composed. Williams took heed of Tallulah's suggestion and, in January 1984, recorded the track at Trident Studios with Hans Zimmer and guitarist Alan Murphy. The story of how it came together, and Tallulah's involvement, is recounted in the 2020 article, 'The Story of a Song'.

In 1990, Tallulah was featured alongside Boy George and Leigh Bowery in the Jesus Loves You 7-minute film short Generations of Love directed by Baillie Walsh. The film was shot in and around Soho, London, and was produced to promote Jesus Loves You's single of the same name. The short film gives an intriguing snapshot into London's Soho nightlife during 1990 (still hungover from the late-1980s) by way of capturing the bustling local outdoor streets, and the inside of long-gone amusement arcades and porn cinemas. Tallulah, in a wig, plays the role of a straight office-type punter, looking for a quick trick, who ends up pulling a transvestite hooker. They visit a Soho porn cinema, where business is dealt. Boy George appears in the film briefly both in drag and as himself.

'One of my earliest memories of Barcode is the image of the legendary and absolutely fabulous DJ Tallulah, in his extremely long coat playing on a night called ‘MezzoDisco’—always treating us with some fantastic tales.'

— Bye Bye Barcode

On Millennium Night 2000, Tallulah DJ'ed at Delano South Beach club in Miami, 'Studio 54 by the sea.' Tallulah recalled the club as being 'the best gig in the world.'

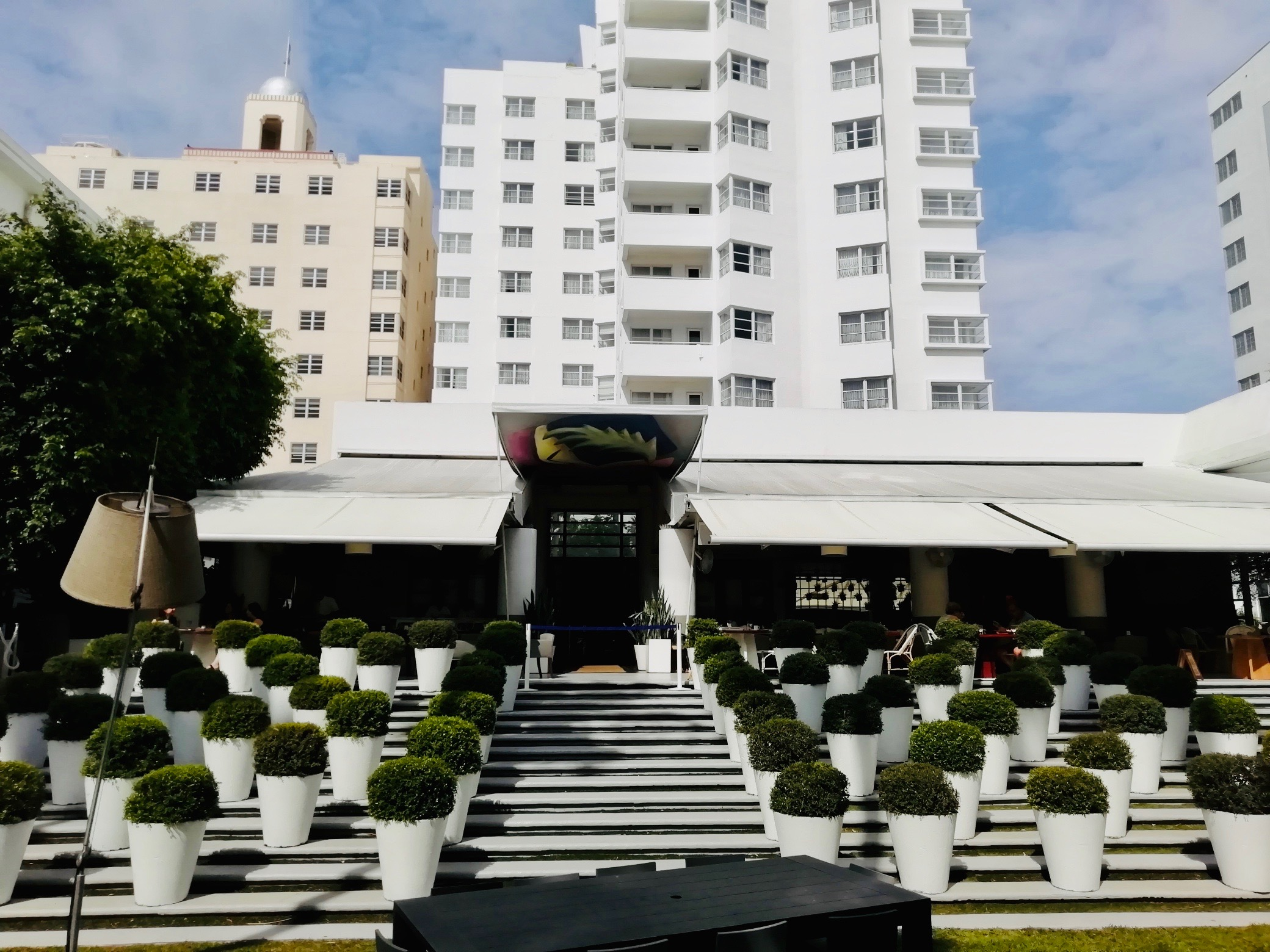
The Delano South Beach Hotel and Club, South Beach, Miami

In 2007, photographer Ophelia Wynne took a set of photographs of Tallulah dressed in an ermine robe holding a staff to celebrate his induction into the UK's House of Homosexual Culture's Hall of Fame. When a reporter asked him his thoughts upon receiving news of the award Tallulah said, "I'm quite honoured, to tell you the truth. I've never been much of a publicity seeker, but the reason I'm doing it is because I think it's quite a good thing. I don’t think we necessarily celebrate individuals in our community enough – it's about time we looked to our own people." He was the first ever inductee. At his induction, Tallulah recalled, how, during the early 1970s, he was one of only five known gay DJ's in London and recalled an underground scene with minimal media exposure. "There were no flyers – it was mainly word of mouth," he said. "I think it's important that younger people look into gay culture a little bit more – it's so easy to be forgotten, particularly where music's concerned."

‘DJ Tallulah was at the heart of London's gay club scene for more than 40 years. His extraordinary life linked the closeted 1960s world of such figures as Joe Orton and Kenneth Williams with the anything goes Soho of today. He ended up as the 'First Lady' of London's gay clubland, by way of such venues as Studio 54, Heaven and the Shadow Lounge.’

— The Times, April 8, 2008.

Tallulah went on to DJ at the heart of London's club scene for more than 40 years and was DJing up until his death.

In late-March 2008, when Tallulah failed to turn up to his club residency, fellow DJ and nearby neighbor Tasty Tim went around to Tallulah's apartment off Ladbroke Grove in North Kensington to check that Tallulah was okay. Tallulah had suffered a cardiac arrest and died at his apartment on 28 March 2008. Over 500 people, including many friends, celebrities, and DJ's associated with Tallulah's career, attended his funeral and memorial service on 11 April held at Kensal Rise. A Facebook page In Memory of Tallulah was set up in his honour for friends and fans to leave their personal memories and tributes.

Tallulah's lifelong friend Granville King died in 2013. A couple of months prior to Tallulah's passing, Tallulah met up with Iain Williams in Brighton. Tallulah and Williams discussed the writing of the DJ's biography. Williams agreed to write the book and had already commenced drafting it a couple of months before Tallulah's death occurred. The book entitled Club Feet and Disco Dancing is centered on Tallulah's early career and his years spent living with Granville King and Williams in Notting Hill during the culturally subversive 1970s and 1980s. After Tallulah's death, and following the subsequent death of Granville King, Williams has temporarily put the project on hold.

== Clubs ==
This is not a comprehensive list of all the clubs Tallulah DJ’d at (of which many were residencies):

- Escort, Pimlico, London (1972)
- Shanes, West London
- Studio 54, New York, US (1975/76)
- BANG, London (1976)
- The Embassy, London
- Scandals, London
- Rollerdisco, London (1980)
- Peppermint Park, London (1981)
- The Porchester Hall Drag Ball, Bayswater, London (1982)
- Heaven, (Charing Cross), London
- Fruit Machine at Heaven, London
- Crash, Vauxhall, London
- Mink Bikini at Hanover Grand, London
- Popbitch
- Salon at Shadow Lounge, Soho, London
- Monster at Substation, London
- Barcode, Vauxhall, London
- Gay Pride, Berlin, Germany
- Substation, Soho, London
- Delano South Beach Florida Club, Miami

== Awards and honors ==
- First inductee into the UK's House of Homosexual Culture's Hall of Fame (2007)
- Red Bull Music Academy (2016, inducted)

== Promoter ==
- Circus Circus (club), Soho, London (1983)
- Queenies (restaurant, bar), Kings Road, Chelsea, London
- Sour Grapes (restaurant, bar) West Kensington, London

== Discography ==
- Tallulah - Everything - Label, Oven Ready Records (1996) Sony Music OVR005
- Tallulah - Gimmee Your Lovestick - Label, 99 degrees (1998)
- Tallulah - Gimmee Your Lovestick (T-Total Remix) - Label, 99 Degrees (1998)
- Gimmee Your Lovestick appeared on Clubnight CD Vol.3 disc 2 - (released on 14 March 1998) - track 14 on DJ Nico P.O.O.L's chosen tracks.

== Film ==
- "Generations of Love" 7-minute short film to promote the single of the same name by Jesus Loves You, directed by Baillie Walsh. The film features Boy George, Tallulah and Leigh Bowery. 1990.
- ‘Boys’ (video) – featuring Leigh Bowery, DJ Tallulah, Mark Lawrence, Matthew Glamore, Jeffrey Hinton, Dean Bright, et al. (1987). Director Baillie Walsh.

== Exhibition ==
- Leigh Bowery! exhibition, TATE Modern, 2025. TABOO (scratch film, 1985) by Jeffery Hinton, shown on a loop in the 'Back To The Club' room at the Leigh Bowery! exhibition, TATE Modern, 2025, contains footage of Tallulah filmed inside TABOO club in 1985.
- LGBT History Month, during February 2025, celebrated Tallulah in their Schools Out program.
