= Love On Love =

Single by E-Zee Possee featuring Dr. Mouthquake

from the album The Bone Dance
- Released: 1989; 1992
- Genre: House; synthpop
- Songwriter(s): Angela Dust; Jeremy Healy; Simon Rogers
- Producer(s): Jeremy Healy

E-Zee Possee singles chronology
"Everything Starts With An 'E'" (1989)	"Love On Love" (1989)	"The Sun Machine" (1990)

Love On Love is a song by English electronic music group E-Zee Possee featuring Dr. Mouthquake. It is written by Boy George (as Angela Dust), Jeremy Healy and Simon Rogers, while Healy produced it. The song was released in 1989 and again in 1992 as a single from their only album, The Bone Dance (1992), peaking at number 59 on the UK Singles Chart and number 30 on the US Billboard Dance Music/Club Play Singles chart.

== Critical reception ==
Bill Coleman from Billboard magazine noted that "this hot R&B-inflected number brims with crossover potential. Great song, performance, and mix." Ernest Hardy from Cashbox wrote, "Though it's been out for a little while, I'm listening a great deal to this single. When I first heard it some time ago at a party, I thought someone had dug up some old, vaulted Sylvester tune, given it a House mix, and created a masterpiece. Though Sylvester had nothing to do with it, this "positive vibe" track is still one of the best things I've heard all year, with a great piano break in the mix, and soaring, heart-felt vocals. Find this."

== Charts ==
Chart (1992)	Peak position
UK Singles (OCC)	59
UK Dance (Music Week)	35
UK Club Chart (Music Week)	26
US Dance Music/Club Play Singles (Billboard)	30
