= Liberation (Lippy Lou song) =

Single by Lippy Lou
- Released: 1995
- Genre: Eurodance; house; ragga
- Length: 3:34
- Label: More Protein
- Songwriters: Neale; Themis; Koglin
- Producer: Mike Koglin

Lippy Lou singles chronology
"Liberation" (1995)	"Freaks" (1995)

Music video
- "Liberation" on YouTube

"Liberation" is a song by British recording artist Lippy Lou, released in 1995 as her debut single. It is co-written by her and produced by German DJ and producer Mike Koglin. US Billboard magazine described it as a "coming out anthem" and it was released on Boy George's record label More Protein. "Liberation" peaked at numbers 57 and eight on the UK Singles Chart and the UK Dance Singles Chart. Outside Europe, it peaked at number 102 in Australia. The accompanying music video was directed by Ben Unwin. It features Lipy Lou with dancers and has a blue sepia tone. The video was a Box Top on British music television channel The Box for 12 weeks from May 1995. In 1996, "Liberation" was re-released as "Liberation (The CD Comeback Mixes)", with new remixes.

== Background ==
In an 1994 interview, Lippy Lou told about making the song, "I first thought of making this record to save on all the stamps I'd have to buy to tell everyone back home about my sexual preferences. I had a moment of worry, but it disappeared pretty quickly. I'm proud of this record. It makes an important statement about freedom and acceptance."

== Critical reception ==
In 1994, Larry Flick from Billboard magazine described the track as "an aggressive club storm that blends rave-drenched keyboards with blunt ragga chatting extolling the joys of lesbian life-both in and out of the bedroom." In 1995, he added that Lippy Lou "raps and toasts on the virtues of homosexual freedom" in "a flurry of slick Euro-dance grooves". He stated that the track "has ferocious energy and passion that grabs the mind and body at the same time," and that the radio version "will not offend or scare listeners, while the original version has red-hot lyrics that are both brave and amusing."

Brad Beatnik from Music Week's RM Dance Update wrote, "The young ragga-chatting lesbian pulls no punches on this debut track which matches the bite of its uncompromising pro-lesbian lyrics with hard tribal beats, wild riffing guitar and a Euro-house melody. The concoction is simplt irresistible – Lippy has a great voice. Mike Koglin's production is excellent and the song's message will certainly grab attention. Suck it and see."

== Track listing ==
- 12", UK (1995)
1. "Liberation" (Shut Up & Suck Mix) – 7:32
2. "Liberation" Pussy Dread Dub) – 6:28
3. "Liberation" Shut Up on the Radio Mix) – 4:28
- CD single, France (1995)
1. "Liberation" (Come Out on the Radio Mix) – 3:34
2. "Liberation" (Shut Up and Play It on the Radio Mix) – 4:28
- CD single (The CD Comeback Mixes), UK (1996)
1. "Liberation" (Come Out on the Radio Mix) – 3:34
2. "Liberation" (Out For The Count) – 6:30
3. "Liberation" (Punch Drunk In Dub) – 6:58
4. "Liberation" (Title Contender Mix) – 6:10
5. "Liberation" (Pussy Dread Knockout) – 6:24
- CD maxi, UK (1995)
1. "Liberation" (Come Out on the Radio Mix) – 3:34
2. "Liberation" (Shut Up & Suck Mix) – 7:32
3. "Liberation" (Pussy Dread Dub) – 6:28
4. "Liberation" (Shut Up on the Radio Mix) – 4:28

== Charts ==
Chart (1995)	Peak position
Australia (ARIA)	102
Scotland (OCC)	71
UK Singles (OCC)	57
UK Dance (OCC)	8
UK Club Chart (Music Week)	14
UK Pop Tip Club Chart (Music Week)	29

Chart (1996)	Peak position
UK Singles (OCC)	96
