= The White Room (UK TV series) =

United Kingdom music television programme

- Genre: Music
- Directed by: Geoff Wonfor
- Presented by: Mark Radcliffe; Lisa I'Anson; Jo Whiley
- Theme music composer: Dave Stewart
- Country of origin: United Kingdom
- Original language: English
- No. of series: 3
- No. of episodes: 21

Production
- Producers: Malcolm Gerrie; Chris Cowey
- Running time: 60 minutes (inc. adverts)
- Production companies: Initial Film and Television

Original release
- Network: Channel 4
- Release: 11 June 1994 – 23 August 1996

The White Room is a British music television programme, which ran for three series and nineteen episodes, as well as two special episodes, from 11 June 1994 to 23 August 1996. It was filmed in Westway Studios, London and produced for Channel 4 by Initial Film and Television Productions.

The first episode of The White Room, a special episode filmed for Channel 4’s Reggae Evening was presented by Mark Radcliffe and Lisa I’Anson, but when the series started in 1995, all presenting was by Mark Radcliffe alone.

All performances were live in the studio, with no interviews. In most episodes archive clips were shown.

Various unique collaborations between acts from different genres and generations were filmed, such as Ray Davies from The Kinks singing with Damon Albarn from Blur, or Stevie Wonder and Des’ree joining to sing Ribbon in the Sky.

Many major artists appeared on the show, such as Oasis, Smashing Pumpkins, Prince (performing as Tora Tora), Little Richard and Lou Reed. Iggy Pop famously appeared on the show wearing a pair of transparent trousers with nothing underneath.

The first two series comprised seven episodes, and the third series was reduced to five episodes. Apart from the first Reggae episode, there was a New Years Eve special shown at the end of 1995, which was co-presented by Jo Whiley.

David Bowie recorded a complete show at the studios on 14 December 1995, four of the eleven recorded tracks being shown through the series, and all the songs being released as an album, but the complete show has not yet been broadcast,

In 1996 the show won the PACT Indie Award for Best Music and Arts programme, but was cancelled the same year because the show's ratings did not justify it's regular time slot.

== Format ==
The series was filmed in a studio with white walls and floor, and the performances were on stages with the band or artists name in a graphic logo behind or occasionally on the floor. Mark Radcliffe usually introduced the acts from the floor among the studio audience, but also from various locations around the studio. The studio setting was designed to highlight the artists and their music without the use of any camera effects to distract from performances.

For some acts, studio dancers were shown in the background, either in view or behind screens as silhouettes.

== Episodes ==
Series one and two were broadcast on Channel Four late on Saturday evenings, but series three was moved to be broadcast on Friday evenings.

Show	Air Date	Guests
Reggae Night Special - presented by Mark Radcliffe and Lisa I'Anson
1	11 June 1994	Sly & Robbie, Jimmy Cliff with Sounds of Blackness (Many Rivers To Cross, I Can See Clearly Now), Toots (54 46 That’s My Number), General Levy (Incredible), Jazz Jamaica with Rico Rodriguez and Courtney Pine (Ramblin', Green Island), Chaka Demus & Pliers (I Wanna Be Your Man), Mick Hucknall (Ghetto Girl, Love Fire)
Series 1 - presented by Mark Radcliffe
2	11 March 1995	Stevie Wonder (Party In The White Room, Superstition, Cold Chill, You Haven’t Done Nothin’), Sleeper (Vegas, Inbetweener), Chaka Khan (Tell Me Something Good - video recorded for show), Des’ree (Feel So High, You Gotta Be), Sex Pistols (Anarchy In The UK video), Ultimate Kaos (Skip To My Loo), Ultimate Kaos with P P Arnold (The First Cut Is The Deepest), Skunk Anansie (Selling Jesus, Charity)
3	18 March 1995	The Troggs (Wild Thing, I Can’t Control Myself), Morphine (Honey White, Super Sex), The Temptations (I Can’t Get Next To You video from TOTP 1969), Little Axe (Ride On, No More War, In The White Room), Terrorvision (Some People Say, Alice What's The Matter?, Oblivion), Stevie Wonder & Des’ree (Ribbon In The Sky), The Small Faces (All Or Nothing video from Beat Beat Beat, German TV 1966), Ray Davies (You Really Got Me, To The Bone), Ray Davies & Damon Albarn (Waterloo Sunset, Parklife)
4	25 March 1995	Brand New Heavies With Gwen Dickey (Car Wash, Close To You), David Bowie (Rebel Rebel video from Musikladen German TV 1978), Lippy Lou (Liberation), Gwen Dickey (Love Don't Live Here Anymore), The Bluetones (Slight Return), Heather Nova (Walk This World, Light Years), Terence Trent D'Arby (She Kissed Me, Holding on To You, Children Of The Revolution), The Cocteau Twins (Seekers Who Are Lovers), The Beatles (The Ballad Of John And Yoko promo video)
5	1 April 1995	Freak Power (Turn On, Tune In, Cop Out, Freak Power), Edwyn Collins and Bernard Butler (In A Broken Dream), T.Rex (Jeepster video from Beat Club 1971), Mica Paris (One, You Got The Love), Marvin Gaye (How Sweet It Is video from Hullabaloo), Grace (Not Over Yet), Spearhead (Hole In Tha Bucket?, Dream Team), The Yardbirds (For Your Love video from Belgium TV 1965), Elastica (Connection, Car Song, Line Up)
6	8 April 1995	Sparks (This Town Ain't Big Enough For The Both Of Us, When I Kiss You I Hear Charlie Parker Playing), Pulp (Monday Morning, Underwear), Otis Redding (Try A Little Tenderness video filmed in Oslo 1967), Terence Trent D'Arby (Jumping Jack Flash), Republica (Bloke), Portishead (Over, Sour Times), Pink Floyd (Arnold Layne promo video), Prince And The New Power Generation (Count The Days, Get Wild)
7	15 April 1995	CJ Lewis (Uptight, Rough and Smooth), Jeanie Tracey and Bobby Womack (This Is A Mans Mans Mans World, Its All Over Now), The Rolling Stones (Not Fade Away video from NME Pollwinners 1964), PJ Harvey (Working For The Man, Goodnight), Sly And The Family Stone (Dance To The Music video from US TV 1968), Oasis (Acquiesce), Paul Weller and Noel Gallagher (Talk Tonight), Paul Weller (The Changingman, Porcelain Gods)
8	22 April 1995	Dave Stewart (Heart Of Stone), Shane MacGowan And The Popes (Donegal Express), Aretha Franklin (Say A Little Prayer video from Tom Jones Show 1970), Gene (Left Handed, Sleep Well Tonight), Roachford (I Don't Know Why I Love You), Paul Weller (Sunflower), Shane MacGowan And The Pope's with Sinead O'Connor (Haunted), Bjork (Army Of Me, I Miss You), Fleetwood Mac (Oh Well video from Detroit TV 1969), Lou Reed And Dave Stewart (Dirty Boulevard, Jealousy, Walk On The Wild Side)
New Years Eve Special - presented by Mark Radcliffe and Jo Whiley
9	31 December 1995	David Bowie (Under Pressure, The Voyeur Of Utter Destruction, Hallo Spaceboy), Pulp (Little Girl With Blue Eyes), Brian Ferry (In The Midnight Hour video), Wilson Pickett (In The Midnight Hour video), Prince And The New Power Generation (Get Wild), Marc Almond (Tainted Love), Eternal And Ivan Matias (It Takes Two), Eternal (Redemption Song), Damon Albarn And Ray Davies (Waterloo Sunset), Dreadzone (Little Britain), Oasis (Don't Look Back In Anger, Wonderwall, Roll With It), General Levy (Incredible), Jimmy Cliff (Many Rivers To Cross), Stevie Wonder (Superstition), Skunk Anansie (Charity), The Rolling Stones (I Wanna Be Your Man video from The Arthur Haynes Show 1964), Chris Farlowe (All Or Nothing), Lou Reed And Dave Stewart (Walk On The Wild Side)
Series 2 - presented by Mark Radcliffe
10	20 January 1996	Robert Palmer (Addicted To Love, Simply Irresistible), Babylon Zoo (Spaceman), Skunk Anansie (Weak), Talking Heads (Once In A Lifetime promo video), Little Richard (Keep a Knockin', Bama Lama, Bama Loo, All Around The World), Solo (Under The Boardwalk, Wonderful World), Ike And Tina Turner (River Deep Mountain High video from Goodbye Again 1968), Blur (Charmless Man, It Could Be You, Mr Robinson's Quango)
11	27 January 1996	Oasis (Round Are Way, Some Might Say), Definition of Sound (Pass The Vibes), Blondie (Denis video from Musikladen 1978), Smashing Pumpkins (Butterfly Wings), Lush (Single Girl, Ladykillers), Joan Osborne (One Of Us, Help Me), The Hollies (Look Through Any Window video from Sunday Night at the London Palladium 1965), The Pretenders with The Duke Quartet, Dave Stewart and Joan Osborne (Creep, Night in My Veins, Brass in Pocket)
12	3 February 1996	Rocket from the Crypt (On A Rope, Born In 69), Edwyn Collins with Paul Cook (Psychedelic Soul, Rip It Up), Spencer Davis Group (Keep On Running video from Beat Beat Beat 1966), Ocean Colour Scene (The Riverboat Song, You’ve Got It Bad), Wasis Diop and Lena Fiagbe (African Dream), Echobelly (Great Things, Natural Animal), The Tams (Hey Girl Don’t Bother Me video from Top of the Pops 1971), BT (Loving You More), Stevie Wonder (Tomorrow Robins Will Sing)
13	10 February 1996	Blur (Stereotypes), Gene and Marc Almond (Say Hello Wave Goodbye), The Cardigans (Sick & Tired), Charlies Angels (I Don't Want To Love You, It's Never Gonna Happen To Me), The Who (The Kids Are Alright video from Swedish TV 1965), Cast (Alright, Sandstorm), Q-Tee (Gimme That Body), Moloko (Dominoid), The Only Ones (Another Girl Another Planet video from Revolver 1978), Lou Reed (Hooky Wooky, Satellite Of Love)
14	17 February 1996	Sting (If I Ever Lose My Faith In You), Teenage Fanclub (Mellow Doubt, Feel A Whole Lot Better), Gabrielle (Give Me A Little More Time), Gabrielle And Geno Washington (Dock Of The Bay), The Equals (Baby Come Back video from West Germany 1967), Prince and The New Power Generation (Count The Days), David McAlmont (What’s the Excuse This Time?, Alfie), Babylon Zoo (The Boy With The X-Ray Eyes), Supergrass (Going Out, We’re Not Supposed To, Strange Ones), The Jimi Hendrix Experience (Purple Haze video from Beat Beat Beat 1967), Sting with Ranking Roger (The Beds Too Big Without You)
15	24 February 1996	Pulp (Monday Morning), Iggy Pop (Pussy Walk, The Passenger, Lust For Life), Dubstar (Anywhere, Not So Manic Now), Tricky And Terry Hall (Ghost Town), Tripping Daisy (I Got A Girl), Nick Cave & The Bad Seeds (Stagger Lee), Nick Cave & The Bad Seeds with PJ Harvey (Henry Lee), Jimi Hendrix (Hey Joe archive video 1967), Lenny Kravitz (Can't Get You Off My Mind)
16	2 March 1996	Gary Numan (Cars, Are Friends Electric?), Everything But The Girl (Before Today, Missing), Lou Reed (Sex With Your Parents), Salad and Sandie Shaw (Girl Don't Come), Sting (I Hold My Head), Kula Shaker (Govinda, Grateful When You're Dead), The Bobby Fuller Four (I Fought The Law video from Shindig 1966), The Clash (I Fought The Law video from The Lyceum, London 1979), David Bowie (Boys Keep Swinging), Massive Attack (Karmacoma, Euro Zero Zero)
Series 3 - presented by Mark Radcliffe
17	26 July 1996	Mark Morrison (Return of the Mack, Crazy), Kula Shaker (Govinda, 303), Aretha Franklin (Respect video from US TV 1968), Neneh Cherry (Inner City Mama, Koochi, Woman's World), My Life Story (Sparkle, Twelve Reasons Why I Love Her), Sinead O’Connor (I Am Enough for Myself), Roger Chapman & Jay Darlington - (The House of The Rising Sun), The Undertones (Teenage Kicks promo video)
18	2 August 1996	Paul Weller (Peacock Suit, Suzie's' Room, Eye Of The Storm), Elvis Costello (The Other End Of The Telescope, Radio Sweetheart/Jackie Wilson Said), Suede (Trash, By The Sea), Alisha's Attic (I Am I Feel, White Room), Dodgy (Staying Out For The Summer), Ricardo Da Force, Buffalo Springfield, Sister Sledge
19	9 August 1996	East 17 (Thunder), Fun Lovin' Criminals (Scooby Snacks, Smoke Em), The Boo Radleys (Wake Up Boo, Whats In The Box), Ruby Turner and Courtney Pine (Bring It On Home), Nicolette, Tommy James and The Shondells (Mony Mony)
20	16 August 1996	Chaka Demus & Pliers, The Charlatans (One To Another, Crashin' In), The Jam (Going Underground promo video), Nut, Jamiroquai - (Our Time Is Coming), Bill Withers (Aint No Sunshine), Manic Street Preachers (A Design For Life, No Surface All Feeling, La Tristessa Durera)
21	23 August 1996	Bryan Adams (I Fought The Law), Gary Barlow (Cuddly Toy, Forever Love), The Beautiful South (Liars Bar), Space (Neighbourhood, You & Me Vs The World), Placebo (Nancy Boy, Teenage Angst), Kula Shaker, Tom Jones and Wilson Pickett (Hey Jude video), Labelle
