= Calling Your Name =

Single by Marilyn

from the album Despite Straight Lines
- B-side: "Move Together"
- Released: 1983
- Recorded: 1983
- Genre: New wave
- Length: 4:03 (7"); 6:52 (12")
- Label: Mercury
- Songwriters: Marilyn; Paul Caplin
- Producers: Clive Langer; Alan Winstanley

Marilyn singles chronology
"Calling Your Name" (1983)	"Cry and Be Free" (1984)

"Calling Your Name" is the debut single by British singer Marilyn. The song was an international hit, peaking at No. 4 on the UK Singles Chart in December 1983 and No. 3 in Australia in April 1984. The song was later included on the singer's 1985 debut album Despite Straight Lines.

== Charts ==
=== Weekly charts ===
Weekly chart performance for "Calling Your Name"
Chart (1983–1984)	Peak position
Australia (Kent Music Report)	3
Irish Singles Chart	10
New Zealand Singles Chart	17
UK Singles Chart	4

=== Year-end charts ===
Year-end chart performance for "Calling Your Name"
Chart (1984)	Position
Australia (Kent Music Report)	19
