= Newley =

Newley is a surname, and it may refer to the following people:

- Anthony Newley (1931–1999), English actor, singer and songwriter
- Brad Newley (born 1985), Australian basketball player, brother of Mia
- Mia Newley (born 1988), Australian basketball player, sister of Brad
- Tara Newley (born 1963), English singer
