= Despite Straight Lines =

- Japanese release

Studio album by Marilyn
- Released: 21 June 1985
- Recorded: 1983–1985
- Genre: New wave; pop
- Length: 36:24
- Label: Mercury/Phonogram
- Producer: Alan Winstanley; Clive Langer; Don Was; Eric Robinson

Singles from Despite Straight Lines
- 1. "Calling Your Name" Released: October 1983; 2. "Cry and Be Free" Released: January 1984; 3. "You Don't Love Me" Released: April 1984; 4. "Baby U Left Me (In the Cold)" Released: April 1985; 5. "Pray for That Sunshine" Released: June 1985

Professional ratings
Review scores
Source	Rating
Smash Hits	6.5/10 stars

Despite Straight Lines is the only studio album by British singer-songwriter Marilyn, released in 1985.

== Overview ==
Although Marilyn had scored three top 40 hits throughout the 1983–84 period, his debut album was not released until mid-1985, 18 months after his biggest hit "Calling Your Name" was a top 10 hit. Possibly due to a loss of momentum, the album only charted in Australia, and subsequent singles taken from it were also unsuccessful.

The album was reissued on CD in 2008 as Despite Straight Lines: The Very Best of Marilyn, by Cherry Pop (a division of Cherry Red Records). The reissue includes several bonus tracks, consisting of B-sides and alternative versions, though it excludes the single "Pray for That Sunshine".

== Track listing ==
1. "Calling Your Name" (Marilyn, Paul Caplin) – 4:06
2. "Mountain to the Ocean" (Roger Jackson) – 3:46
3. "Surrender to Your Love" (Marilyn) – 4:04
4. "Pray for That Sunshine" (Marilyn) – 4:00
5. "Third Eye" (Marilyn) – 3:24
6. "Baby U Left Me (In the Cold)" (Marilyn) – 3:51
7. "You Don't Love Me" (Marilyn) – 3:24
8. "Give It Up" (Eric Robinson) – 3:58
9. "Wear It Out" (Marilyn, Eric Robinson) –2:17
10. "Cry and Be Free" (Marilyn) – 3:34

CD re-issue (bonus tracks)

1. "Calling Your Name" (Midnight Party Mix) (Marilyn, Paul Caplin) – 4:42
2. "Move Together" (Marilyn) – 3:36
3. "Calling Your Name" (Extended Version) (Marilyn, Paul Caplin) – 6:54
4. "Running" (Marilyn) – 3:06
5. "Cry and Be Free" (Gospel) (Marilyn) – 5:43
6. "Cry and Be Free" (Streisand Style) (Marilyn) – 5:19
7. "Raining Again" (Dub Version) (Marilyn) – 7:08
8. "Baby U Left Me (In the Cold)" (Extended Version) (Marilyn) – 7:08

== Personnel ==
Producers

- Alan Winstanley (tracks 1, 3, 6, 9, 10, 12, 14, 15)
- Clive Langer (tracks 1, 3, 6, 9, 10, 12, 14, 15)
- Don Was (tracks 2, 5, 17)
- Eric Robinson (tracks 4, 7, 8)
- Roger Jackson (tracks 11, 13, 16)
- Julian Mendelsohn - mixing (tracks 8, 9)
- Clare Muller - photography
- Bobby Rae, Carol "Sugar Lips" Hall, Claudia Fontaine, Eric Robinson, Sweet Pea "Python" Atkinson - backing vocals

== Charts ==
Chart performance for Despite Straight Lines
Chart (1985)	Peak position
Australian Albums (Kent Music Report)	73
