= Bow Down Mister =

1991 single by Jesus Loves You

Single by Jesus Loves You

from the album The Martyr Mantras
- B-side: "Love Hurts" (Yes It Doz U Blighter mix)
- Released: 11 February 1991
- Genre: Acoustic pop; house
- Length: 6:32 (album version)
- Label: More Protein
- Songwriter: Angela Dust
- Producer: Bruce Forest

Jesus Loves You singles chronology
"One on One" (1990)	"Bow Down Mister" (1991)	"Generations of Love" (1991)

Audio
- "Bow Down Mister" on YouTube

"Bow Down Mister" is a song written by English singer Boy George, under the pseudonym "Angela Dust", and recorded by his first musical group following his departure from Culture Club, Jesus Loves You. Inspired by a trip George took to India, the song is a tribute to the Hare Krishna movement and incorporates the Hare Krishna mantra. Indian singer Asha Bhosle performs the female vocals on the song but is uncredited on the single release.

"Bow Down Mister" was released on 11 February 1991 by record label More Protein as the fourth single from the project's only studio album, The Martyr Mantras (1991). It reached number 27 on the UK Singles Chart and became a bigger hit in several mainland European countries, especially in Austria and Germany, where the song reached the top 10.

== Background and meaning ==
Boy George wrote "Bow Down Mister" shortly after taking a trip to India. George was intrigued that the song was perceived as radical to the public, as this was not his intention; however, he went on to explain, "That is unless you consider a song that encourages love instead of hate as being radical. I am continually amazed at how, with all of the knowledge we have as humans, we continue to be so small-minded." The track was written as an ode to the Hare Krishna movement, a Hindu religious organisation whose members dedicate their thoughts and actions to the Hindu deity Krishna, and the song recites the Hare Krishna mantra several times during the bridge. Indian playback singer Asha Bhosle is featured as the female vocalist on the recording. During an interview, Bhosle stated that "Bow Down Mister" was the best song she had contributed to and that she cherished it during her lifetime.

== Critical reception ==
Billboard writer Larry Flick called the song "thoroughly original and refreshing" and praised its "anthemic" melody but found the song "too offbeat" for UK hit radio. In the same magazine, a review of the parent album called the homage "quirky". AllMusic reviewer William Ruhlmann referred to "Bow Down Mister" as one of the "oddest" songs on The Martyr Mantras. Alan Jones from Music Week named it Pick of the Week, writing, "Boy George's latest project is so bizarre it's not surprising that it takes a little time to reveal its full potency. But there's much to admire here, with some haunting Indian singing before the track resolves itself as a worthy dancefloor contender." Chris Mellor from Record Mirror noted, "Indian dance music, hippy chic George Harrison style Hare Krishna chants mingle with beautiful sitars and Boy George's inimitable vocal style to create something quite stunning." Another editor, Phil Cheeseman felt that it has "a terrible line [...] about Hindus knowing the score, not enormously subtle given the current flare-up of religious and caste violence in India."

== Chart performance ==
On the UK Singles Chart, "Bow Down Mister" debuted at number 69 on 17 February 1991, taking a total of five weeks to peak at number 27 on 17 March 1991. It spent three more weeks in the top 100 before dropping out in early April. The same month, the track appeared on the French Singles Chart at number 41, rising to a peak of number 29 on two occasions and spending 13 weeks on the chart. In late May, the single entered the Austrian and German Singles Chart. In Austria, it rose to number two and totalled 22 weeks in the top 30, ending 1991 as the country's 10th-highest-selling single. Meanwhile, in Germany, it peaked at number six for two weeks, logged 27 weeks in the top 100, and finished the year at number 17 on Germany's year-end chart. In Switzerland, it reached number 15, while in the Flanders region of Belgium, it debuted at its peak of number 44. On the Eurochart Hot 100, "Bow Down Mister" rose to number 20 in August 1991 and was ranked Europe's 73rd-best-performing hit of the year.

== Track listings ==
- UK 12-inch single

A. "Bow Down Mister" (Sitari Bizzari mix) – 6:24
B. "Bow Down Mister" (Floating in the Ganges – Grid mix) – 7:04

- French maxi-single
1. "Bow Down Mister" (A Small Portion 2 B Polite mix) – 3:59
2. "Bow Down Mister" (Nayana Banana Govinda Goulash mix) – 6:25
3. "Love Hurts" (Yes It Doz U Blighter mix) – 3:59
- German 7-inch single

A. "Bow Down Mister" (A Small Portion 2B Polite mix) – 3:59
B. "Love Hurts" (Yes It Doz U Blighter mix) – 3:59

== Charts ==
=== Weekly charts ===
Chart (1991)	Peak position
Australia (ARIA)	142
Austria (Ö3 Austria Top 40)	2
Belgium (Ultratop 50 Flanders)	44
Europe (Eurochart Hot 100)	20
France (SNEP)	29
Germany (GfK)	6
Israel (Israeli Singles Chart)	9
Switzerland (Schweizer Hitparade)	15
UK Singles (Official Charts)	27
UK Airplay (Music Week)	13
UK Dance (Music Week)	48

=== Year-end charts ===
Chart (1991)	Position
Austria (Ö3 Austria Top 40)	10
Europe (Eurochart Hot 100)	73
Germany (Media Control)	17

=== Decade-end charts ===
Chart (1990–1999)	Rank
Austria (Ö3 Austria Top 40)	57

== Release history ==
Region	Date	Format(s)	Label(s)	Ref.
United Kingdom	11 February 1991	—N/a	More Protein	
Australia	15 April 1991	7-inch vinyl; 12-inch vinyl; cassette	Virgin	
