= Marilyn (singer) =

English singer and songwriter (born 1962)

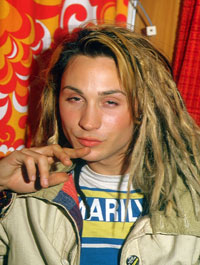
- Marilyn in 1984
- Born: Peter Antony Robinson; 3 November 1962 (age 63); Kingston, Jamaica
- Occupations: Singer; songwriter
- Years active: 1983–1985, 1989, 2000–2003, 2016
- Musical career
- Origin: London, England
- Genres: New wave; pop
- Labels: Phonogram (1983–1985); Interbeat (1989); Desilu Records (2000)

Peter Antony Robinson (born 3 November 1962), better known as Marilyn, is an English singer known for his androgynous appearance. He was one of Britain's most successful gender bending musical artists in the 1980s. First becoming a noted figure on the London club scene, Marilyn topped the European, Japanese and Australian charts with his 1983 hit "Calling Your Name". The song was later included on his 1985 debut album Despite Straight Lines.

Marilyn also contributed to the Christmas number one Band Aid song, "Do They Know It's Christmas?" He has modelled for several fashion designers including Jean Paul Gaultier and Vivienne Westwood. Photographs of him are housed in London's National Portrait Gallery. Marilyn has been portrayed in several productions, including Boy George's stage musical Taboo which reflected on the New Romantic scene, and by the actor Freddie Fox in the 2010 BBC television film Worried About the Boy.

== Early life and persona ==
Robinson was born in Kingston, Jamaica. At age 5, he moved with his mother to Borehamwood. He left school at 15, and has stated that he was bullied at school for being feminine, and that he self-harmed. As a boy, Robinson loved Marilyn Monroe's image, and Marilyn became his school nickname. While the name originated from homophobic bullies at school, Robinson decided to appropriate it to his advantage. As a teenager, he was a regular nightclub-goer and wanted to look different, so he adopted a Marilyn Monroe image wearing vintage dresses with bleached blond hair. He became part of the British New Romantic movement which emerged in the late-1970s club scene.

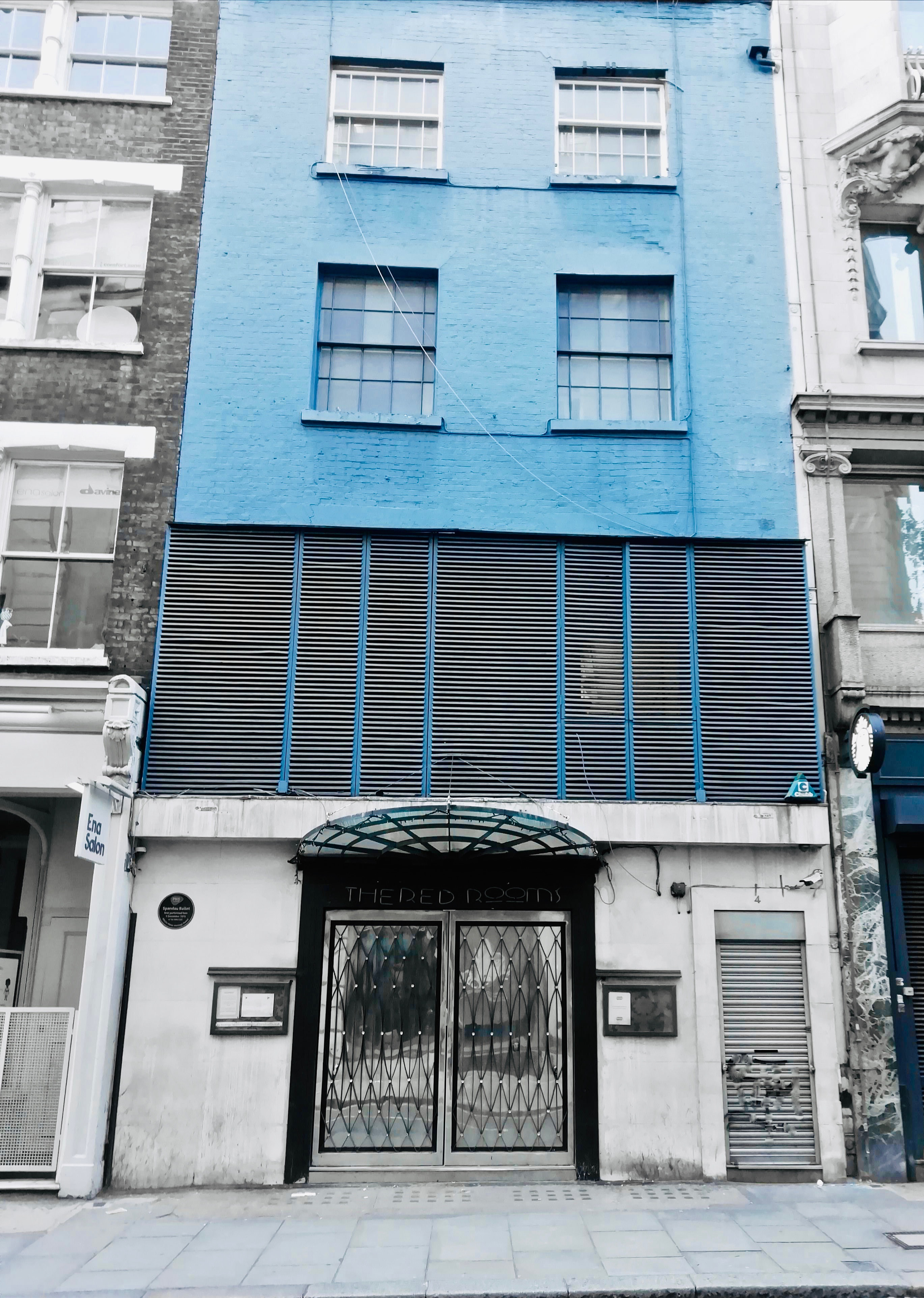
The former location of the Blitz Club

Robinson was a regular at the Blitz nightclub (regulars being labelled as Blitz Kids), a highly stylised club in London run by Steve Strange of the pop group Visage, and a place which spawned many early 1980s pop stars such as Spandau Ballet. During this time, Robinson met Boy George (prior to his forming Culture Club). Marilyn features prominently in George's autobiography, Take It Like a Man. In the book, George claimed that while they were living in a squat together, they were chased out by a male neighbour who was attracted to Marilyn, but who then broke the door down with an axe when he discovered Marilyn was a man. He also claimed Marilyn once tried to seduce David Bowie at a London nightclub.

In 1979, Robinson appeared in the documentary Steppin' Out directed by Lyndall Hobbs, which explored the fashionable nightclubs and the trendy pop culture scenes that were famous in London at the time. It was shown as the support film to Alien in British cinemas. That year, he also appeared in the first segment of director Derek Jarman's 12-minute short film Broken English. While Boy George went on to form Culture Club in 1981 and secured a recording deal with Virgin Records, Marilyn was still scouting for a recording contract and had relocated to Los Angeles. There, he worked as a personal assistant to daytime soap star Terry Lester, and teamed up with songwriter and pop entrepreneur Paul Caplin who became his manager.

== Career ==
=== Music career in the 1980s ===
After Boy George had made a commercial impact with Culture Club, record companies were looking for other artists with a similar cross-dressing image. In 1983, following a high-profile appearance in the promotional music video for Eurythmics' hit single, "Who's That Girl?", Robinson signed his own recording contract under the stage name "Marilyn" with Phonogram Records. His first chart success came in late-1983 with his debut single "Calling Your Name" which reached the Top 5 in the UK (No. 4) and Australia (No. 3). Marilyn had two further minor UK Top 40 hits in 1984 with "Cry and Be Free" (No. 31) and "You Don't Love Me" (No. 40). In March 1984, Marilyn flew to Australia for a 10-day promotional tour and was besieged by fans who were waiting to greet him at Melbourne Airport. While in Australia, Marilyn was attacked and kicked in the face by a member of the public at the Exchange Hotel, a gay bar venue in Sydney, sustaining a bruised eye from the incident.

In late-1984, Marilyn took part in the Band Aid charity single "Do They Know It's Christmas?" along with various other pop stars of the era. In early-1985, facing financial difficulties and being forced to sell his London home, Phonogram Records dispatched him to Detroit, to work with producer Don Was. While in America, he cut his trademark long blonde hair short and ceased wearing make-up, abandoning the image that had brought him his initial success. After spending a week recording new material with Was, Marilyn was scheduled to perform live for the first time at New York's Area nightclub. The performance was intended to be filmed for use in the music video for his new single, "Baby U Left Me", but the film crew were delayed, and although Marilyn proceeded to go onstage, the performance was ruined by technical problems with the club's PA system. Midway through his first song, Marilyn abandoned the performance.

In June 1985, Marilyn released his debut album, Despite Straight Lines. Despite including his three earlier UK Top 40 hit singles, the album only charted in Australia (No. 73). Further singles from the album, "Baby U Left Me" and "Pray for That Sunshine" were unsuccessful, although the former reached the Top 40 in Australia (No. 34). By this time, Robinson's drug addiction and his highly publicised disputes with Boy George damaged his public image. Marilyn performed live once in December 1986 at the Mud Club in London, where he performed a cover version of "Spirit in the Sky" which was planned to be his new single but was never released.

=== Activities from 2000 ===
In 2000, Robinson attempted to relaunch his career and recorded a new single as Marilyn, a cover version of the Dennis Brown song "How Could I Live?" for Desilu Records. Robinson recorded the track in Jamaica and several months later producer Nick Cabrera flew out there to supervise the final work on the track and its subsequent remixes by German producer Kinky Roland. Following disagreements with the label, Robinson refused to let the single be released. On 2 September 2001, Marilyn performed a live appearance at the Sound on Sunday club night in Leicester Square, London. It was his first live performance in over fourteen years. A self-released single was issued in 2003.

=== Career since 2013 ===
On 16 May 2013, Robinson appeared on Birmingham's Switch Radio where he gave a 30-minute interview. The following month, he appeared on Kev Gurney's Club Tropicana radio show where he gave a 20-minute interview in which he revealed that he had been working on four new tracks with a new production team, and suggested the possibility of live dates in the future. Robinson appeared on an episode of Celebrity Gogglebox that aired on Channel 4 on 9 October 2015 as part of the channel's Stand Up to Cancer Charity Evening.

In 2015, Robinson began writing and recording new material with Boy George as producer. On 23 September 2016, Marilyn released his first new single in thirty years, entitled "Love or Money". In March 2021, Bruce Ashley's documentary Blitzed: The 80's Blitz Kids' Story, was shown on Sky Arts. Boy George, Rusty Egan and Marilyn all appeared in the film discussing their time at the club and about the early-1980s era, while La Roux was interviewed about the cultural effects of the New Romantic movement on younger performers like herself.

== Personal life ==
In 1986, Robinson was arrested during a series of police raids on persons believed to be supplying Boy George with heroin. On 20 August 1986, at Marylebone Magistrates Court in London, a magistrate dismissed a heroin charge against Robinson because the prosecution offered no evidence. "It was not what I expected–I am ecstatic and I am very happy," said Marilyn. In a November 2014 interview with the Daily Mirror, Robinson said that he had been a heroin addict from the mid-1980s to the mid-2000s.

In his 1995 autobiography Take It Like a Man, Boy George wrote that Robinson had a relationship with singer Gavin Rossdale in the 1980s. In a 1996 interview for Rolling Stone, Rossdale responded, "That's George's take – he doesn't know me. There's a queue of people going to their lawyers about stuff in his book. I hope he manages to sell some books by putting my name in there." Elsewhere, both Rossdale and Robinson initially denied the story; however, in 2003, Robinson dedicated the Marilyn single "Hold on Tight" to Rossdale, citing "the years of [their] passionate relationship" and featuring a photo of him and Rossdale on the cover. In 2009, Robinson confirmed that he and Rossdale had been "together [for] five years" in the 1980s. In 2010, Rossdale acknowledged having a liaison with Robinson, describing it as experimentation and "part of growing up". Robinson later called Rossdale "the love of my life".

== Discography ==
=== Albums ===
List of albums, with selected details
| Title | Album details | Peak chart positions |
| Title | Album details | AUS |
|---|---|---|
| Despite Straight Lines | Release date: 21 June 1985; Label: Mercury/Phonogram | 73 |

=== Singles ===
List of singles, with selected chart positions and certifications
| Title | Year | Peak chart positions | | | | | | Certifications (sales thresholds) | Album |
| Title | Year | UK | AUS | BEL (FL) | IRE | NLD | NZ | Certifications (sales thresholds) | Album |
|---|---|---|---|---|---|---|---|---|---|
| "Calling Your Name" | 1983 | 4 | 3 | — | 10 | — | 17 | BPI: Silver | Despite Straight Lines |
| "Cry and Be Free" | 1984 | 31 | 24 | — | — | — | — | | Despite Straight Lines |
| "You Don't Love Me" | 1984 | 40 | 57 | 26 | — | 18 | 16 | | Despite Straight Lines |
| "Baby U Left Me (In the Cold)" | 1985 | 70 | 34 | — | — | — | — | | Despite Straight Lines |
| "Pray for That Sunshine" | 1985 | — | — | — | — | — | — | | Despite Straight Lines |
| "Love or Money" | 2016 | — | — | — | — | — | — | | Non-album single |

== Popular culture ==
Nicola Tyson's 2013 Bowie Nights at Billy's Club, London, 1978 Exhibition at Sadie Coles HQ Gallery, London W1 – 25 January – 23 February 2013.

We Can Be Heroes: Punks, Poseurs, Peacocks and People of a Particular Persuasion by Graham Smith, published by Unbound – 20 November 2012.
