= Kate Garner =

British photographer, fine artist and singer (born 1954)

- Born: Kathryn Mary Garner; 9 July 1954 (age 72); Wigan, Lancashire
- Known for: Artist

Kathryn Mary Garner (born 9 July 1954) is a British photographer, fine artist and singer.

== Early life ==
Garner was born in Wigan, Lancashire to Anne Philomena Shannon and George Sandeman Garner, a factory worker and a sailor. She was expelled from high school at the age of 16, and became a runaway who joined The Children of God. To escape the grasp of the cult, she hitchhiked from London through eastern Europe to India in 1970, where she lived for a year before being located by her parents. She attended art school at Blackpool; later she moved to London, where she began to both photograph and model for magazines such as The Face and i-D.

== Career ==
Garner first came into the public eye as one third of the 1980s avant-garde, new wave pop project Haysi Fantayzee, along with other members Jeremy Healy and Paul Caplin. Emanating from street arts scenes such as the Blitz Kids that were cropping up in London in the early 1980s, Haysi Fantayzee's music combined reggae, country and electro with political and sociological lyrics couched as nursery rhymes.

Haysi Fantayzee combined their extreme clothes sense – described as combining white Rasta, tribal chieftain and Dickensian styles – with a quirky musical sound comparable to other new wave musical pop acts of the era, such as Bow Wow Wow, Adam and the Ants and Bananarama. They appeared several times on the BBC Television programme Top of the Pops. Despite being touted by David Bowie's producer Tony Visconti as the next big thing, the group quickly disbanded after releasing three hit singles, "John Wayne Is Big Leggy", "Shiny Shiny" and "Holy Joe", and an album, Battle Hymns for Children Singing, that went gold.

Garner then returned to painting, photography and video, launching a successful media arts career, starting with her collaboration with Sinéad O'Connor, in which she created memorable images of O'Connor for her 1987 debut, The Lion and the Cobra. Garner has since photographed a wide range of musicians and celebrities, including David Bowie, Twigs, Bjork, Yoko Ono, John Galliano, and Kate Moss. Her work has appeared in the American and British versions of Vogue and Harper's Bazaar as well as W magazine, Interview, i-D, The Face, GQ, Vanity Fair, Elle and The Sunday Times.

She had her first multimedia exhibition in February 2007 at the Painter's Gallery on Charing Cross Road, London, and a year later had an exhibition in San Francisco, California, titled 'Identity Artists'. She has shown at/with Galerie13 and Art Cube in Paris. her wallpapers are archived at the Victoria and Albert museum in London https://collections.vam.ac.uk/item/O1174627/brilliant-me-wallpaper-de-angelis/
