= Tara Newley =

British writer, broadcaster, and producer

- Born: Tara Cynara Newley; 12 October 1963 (age 63); New York City, U.S.
- Other name: Tara Newley Arkle
- Education: The American College, Paris; Boston University; Harvard University
- Occupations: Writer, broadcaster, producer, singer
- Years active: 1984–present
- Spouses: Michael Adam (m. 1998; div. 2002) Nicholas Gilador Arkle (m. 2016)
- Children: 2
- Parent(s): Anthony Newley; Joan Collins
- Relatives: Alexander Newley (brother)

Tara Cynara Newley (born 12 October 1963) is a British writer, broadcaster, and producer.

== Early life ==
Newley is the daughter of actress Joan Collins and actor/composer/singer Anthony Newley. She is also the sister of Alexander Newley. She lived in Paris for two years to study at The American College in Paris, where her poetry and journalism were first published. She transferred to Boston University to study English, French, and Russian literature and poetry with Helen Vendler at Harvard.

== Early career ==
Newley was a television presenter and recording artist in the early 1990s. She was signed to Boy George's More Protein label with Virgin,wrote the lyrics and sang on the E-Zee Possee single "Breathing Is E-Zee", which went to No. 72 on the UK Singles Chart in 1991. She also released the single "Save Me from Myself" in 1993 on ZTT Records. Further recordings include a duet with her father on a version of "Why".

Shows that she has presented include the music show Juice (Season 1 & 2), Club Vegetarian, The Style Guide, and Celebrity.

As a radio presenter, Newley worked as a presenter for Capital Radio with Neil Fox, Talk Radio, Radio 5, LBC, GLR, France Culture Radio, and Viva!

As a columnist, she wrote for the Daily Mail and Good Health Magazine, and had an online column titled "Sex in the Country". As a journalist, she has written for OK!, the Daily Express, and The Sunday Times.

She provided voice-over work for children's shows such as Cubeez and Fimbles, as well as TV shows for Channel 5 and ITV.

== Writer/producer ==
In 2007, Newley and producer John Dale founded Newley Dale Ltd, a content creation company whose clients include Comedy Box and Momedia. It gained the attention of BBC Three for the anarchic sitcom Sso!

As a writer/producer, she has worked for Channel 4 and Baby Cow. The screenplay Graffiti Boy <3 Guerrilla Girl won first place at the Moondance International Film Festival and second place at the ReelHeART Film and Screenplay Festival in 2018.

In 2010, she wrote a screenplay called Is Love Therapy?

== Poetry ==
Her poetry has appeared under her married name Arkle at the Bristol Poetry Festival in 2014 and The Poetry Shed in 2018. She was long listed for the National Poetry Prize in 2019. She is currently poet in residence at Sidcot School, North Somerset.

== Personal life ==
Newley was married to French composer Michael Adam, with whom she has a daughter, who was born in 1998. The couple were divorced. She later had a son, born in 2003.

She married writer Nicholas Gilador Arkle in 2016.
