= Haysi Fantayzee =

British pop group

- Origin: England
- Genres: Pop; new wave
- Years active: 1981–1983
- Labels: Regard; RCA
- Past members: Jeremy Healy; Kate Garner; Paul Caplin

Haysi Fantayzee were a British pop band of the early 1980s. Their best-known songs are "John Wayne Is Big Leggy", released in 1982, and "Shiny Shiny", released in 1983.

== Career ==
Haysi Fantayzee was an avant-garde, new wave pop project emanating from the Blitz Kids street arts scene in London in the early 1980s. The group's music combined reggae, country and electro with political and sociological lyrics couched as nursery rhymes.

Haysi Fantayzee combined their extreme clothes sense – described as combining white Rasta, tribal chieftain and Dickensian styles – with a quirky musical sound comparable to, but distinct from, other new-wave musical pop acts of the era, such as Bow Wow Wow, Adam and the Ants and Bananarama. They appeared several times on the BBC Television programme Top of the Pops.

The band was formed in 1981 and consisted of Jeremy Healy (also known as Jeremiah), Kate Garner and songwriter/producer/manager Paul Caplin, who was Garner's boyfriend. They released four singles in 1982 and 1983: "John Wayne Is Big Leggy", "Holy Joe", "Shiny Shiny", and "Sister Friction". They followed with the album Battle Hymns for Children Singing.

Before they were signed, the band attracted attention by sending video performances with their demo tapes to record companies, a highly unusual practice at the time. Their outfits were often designed by Garner, and the two singers looked like distorted mirror images of each other, with similar hair and make-up.

In a 1983 interview with David Maples on the US TV show MV3, Jeremy Healy accused Boy George of imitating his unusual look. Boy George later responded: "When Jeremy saw my locks, he was livid. Both he and Kim [Bowen] stopped speaking to me. They thought I had stolen their look. It wasn't their look to steal..."

Garner also appeared alongside Bananarama in the music video for "Who's That Girl" by Eurythmics. She had a brief solo career after the break-up of Haysi Fantayzee, and then pursued a career in photography in the US.

Healy released the single "When Malindy Sings" in 1984, and later became a DJ and album mixer for other artists, including his former schoolfriend Boy George. He recorded on George's More Protein record label under the name E-Zee Possee.

== Band members ==
- Jeremy Healy – vocals
- Kate Garner – vocals
- Paul Caplin – keyboards

== Discography ==
=== Albums ===
Year	Title	Peak chart positions		
Year	Title	UK	AUS	GER
1983	Battle Hymns for Children Singing	53	48	40

=== Singles ===
Year	Title	Peak chart positions							
Year	Title	UK	AUS	AUT	GER	IRE	NZ	SWI	US
1982	"John Wayne Is Big Leggy"	11	—	13	3	22	—	4	—
1982	"Holy Joe"	51	—	—	—	—	—	—	—
1983	"Shiny Shiny"	16	3	—	22	11	37	—	74
1983	"Sister Friction"	62	—	—	—	—	—	—	—
1983	"Chizoola"	—	—	—	—	—	—	—	—
"—" denotes releases that did not chart

== See also ==
- List of performers on Top of the Pops
- List of new wave artists
