= Everybody (Kinky song) =

Single by MC Kinky
- Released: 1996
- Genre: Electronic, hard house
- Label: Feverpitch
- Songwriters: Caron Geary, Bryn Wildish
- Producers: Bryn Wildish, Caron Geary, Diddy

Everybody is a 1996 single by MC Kinky, recorded under the alias "Kinky". It reached No. 71 on the UK Singles Chart.
