= The Sun Machine =

Single by E-Zee Possee

from the album The Bone Dance
- Released: 1990
- Genre: Electronic, house
- Length: 6:38 (master mix); 3:53 (7" edit)
- Songwriter(s): David Bowie, Jeremy Healy, Naomi Thompson, Robert L Owen
- Producer(s): Jeremy Healy

E-Zee Possee singles chronology
"Love On Love" (1989)	"The Sun Machine" (1990)	"Breathing Is E-Zee" (1991)

Music video
- "The Sun Machine" on YouTube

The Sun Machine is a 1990 song by E-Zee Possee. It samples David Bowie's 1969 song, "Memory of a Free Festival" from his album, Space Oddity. The single peaked on number 62 on the UK Singles Chart.

== Critical reception ==
David Giles from Music Week wrote, "Variations on an obscure David Bowie track, plus the usual bluesy female vocals, house piano and thumping beat — a formula whose time is gradually running out."

== Charts ==
Chart (1990)	Peak position
UK Singles (OCC)	62
