= MC Kinky =

English raggamuffin toaster

- Also known as: Feral, Feral is Kinky, Feral a.k.a. MC Kinky, Cantankerous, The Infidel, Special K
- Born: Caron Liza Geary; 15 October 1963 (age 63); Paddington, London, England
- Origin: Kilburn, North West London, England
- Genres: Ragga, dancehall
- Years active: 1989–present
- Label: More Protein

Caron Liza Geary (born 15 October 1963 in Paddington, London), known by various stage names, is an English female raggamuffin toaster. She was the first white female reggae/dancehall MC.

According to Geary, her first recorded appearance was on a cover of "Kid Ralph", a dancehall track by Little Twitch. The song talks about a "legendary" homosexual figure in Jamaica's prison system. She has subsequently worked as a solo artist and with other musicians, including Erasure and Boy George, who described her music as "the dirtiest 'slackest' reggae I'd heard since the seventies".

== Background ==
Growing up in Marylebone, Geary lived adjacent to an after-hours party which blasted out reggae music. As a result, Geary was exposed to reggae from a very young age. It is these experiences which inspired her to write the controversial song "Everything Starts with an 'E'" as part of E-Zee Possee, which was banned by the BBC because of its lyrics and made No. 69 in the UK Singles Chart in 1989, leaving the chart after only one week. It was re-released in March 1990 and climbed to No. 15 on the UK chart, spending eight weeks in the chart.

Kinky's first solo single, the Apollo 440 produced "Get Over It", reached No. 95 on the UK Singles Chart. Her only solo top 75 hit, coming five years later, was Everybody, released under the name "Kinky", which charted at No. 71 on that chart.

Kinky has been touring underground, occasionally providing vocals for other artists. In 1997, she took a residency in Ibiza as "the Infidel", operating under the name for a week before writing an album called Cantankerous and taking up the name for herself. When a member of staff at Club Motherfucker described her sound as "feral pop", she became "Feral" and finally ended up with "Feral a.k.a. MC Kinky" and "FERALisKINKY".

== Artistry ==
Descriptions of Geary's sound have varied from a "bass driven, vitriolic sonic hybrid of grimy electronic ragga, manic house and punk rock" to a "white female raggamuffin toaster". Kinky has denounced these descriptions, saying "I can't be bothered with people who spend large amounts of time trying to place people and music into small and narrow categories. I do what comes naturally to me, and it usually has a combination of influences."

== Discography ==
=== Singles ===
==== Solo singles ====
Year	Single	UK chart position
1991	"Get Over It"	95
1991	"Inna We Kingdom"	—
1992	"Won Love"	—
1992	"Twisting The Mind"	—
1996	"Everybody" (as "Kinky")	71

==== As featured artist ====
Year	Single	UK chart position
1989	"Everything Starts with an 'E'" (E-Zee Possee ft. MC Kinky)	69
1990	"Everything Starts with an 'E'" (re-entry) (E-Zee Possee ft. MC Kinky)	15
1990	"Generations of Love" (Jesus Loves You ft. MC Kinky)	80
1991	"Generations of Love" (re-entry) (Jesus Loves You ft. MC Kinky)	35
1992	"Take a Chance on Me" (Erasure ft. Special K)	1 track from Abba-esque
1992	"Flight" (Flight ft. MC Kinky)	—
1995	"Yalla Chant" (She A Baad Gal Edit; Natacha Atlas ft. MC Kinky)	—
2000	"The Chase" (Giorgio Moroder vs. Jam & Spoon ft. MC Kinky)	—
2001	"We Love" (Storm ft. MC Kinky)	—
2006	"Wind It Up" (Abashment Electro House Mix; Gwen Stefani ft. MC Kinky)	—
2013	"Raging in the Dancehall" (Endymion & The Viper ft. FERAL is KINKY)	—
2013	"Heavy Medication Punx Soundcheck" (Endymion Remix ft. FERAL is KINKY)	
2014	"Reload" Endymion ft. FERAL is KINKY	
2013	"Bring Dat" (Daishi Dance ft. FERAL is KINKY)	—
2017	"Militant" Will Sparks & Tyron Hapi (ft. FERAL is KINKY)	—

=== Other songs ===
Year	Song
1989	"Kipsy" (Boy George ft. MC Kinky)
1995	"Son of Bambi (Walk Tuff)" (Towa Tei ft. MC Kinky)
