= Alexander Newley =

British artist (born 1965)

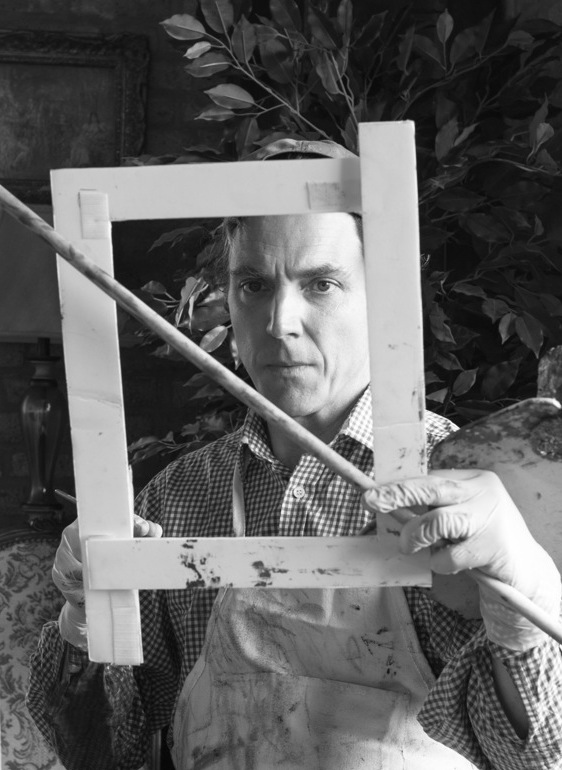
- Newley in 2016
- Born: Alexander Anthony Newley; 8 September 1965 (age 60); New York City, U.S.
- Other name: Sacha Newley
- Occupations: Artist, portraitist, writer, teacher
- Spouse(s): Angela Tassoni (m. 2002; div. 2014) Sheela Raman (m. 2025)
- Children: 1
- Parents: Anthony Newley (father); Joan Collins (mother)
- Relatives: Tara Newley (sister)
- Website: alexandernewley.com

Alexander Newley (born 8 September 1965), also known as Sacha Newley, is a British contemporary artist, portraitist, writer and teacher known for his portrait paintings, including Gore Vidal and Billy Wilder.

== Early life ==
Newley's father was actor and songwriter Anthony Newley, and his mother is actress Joan Collins, with whom he appeared in the 1969 film Can Heironymus Merkin Ever Forget Mercy Humppe and Find True Happiness?. Also known as Sacha Newley, he is one of two children from Collins' second marriage to Newley, the other being writer/broadcaster Tara Newley. From an early age, he loved the drama of the stage and transformative power of actors.

== Portraits ==
Newley has painted Christopher Reeve, Oliver Stone and Steven Berkoff. His portraits of Vidal and Reeve form part of the permanent collection of the National Portrait Gallery at The Smithsonian in Washington DC.

His portraits of Nigel Hawthorne in character as King George III were commissioned by the British National Theatre to promote their premiere production of the Alan Bennett play The Madness of George III. In 2006, Newley's full-length portrait of Hawthorne was acquired by the Victoria and Albert Museum for their permanent collection celebrating Theatre in the 20th century.

In 2016, Newley completed a series of portraits of Kenneth Branagh, Judi Dench, Adrian Lester, Derek Jacobi and Lily James. Newley worked on the portraits for a year, and was granted access backstage at the Garrick Theatre in order to capture the energy and dynamism of the actors in character. These were featured in a major solo exhibition Portraits in Character and charity gala auction at St Martin-in-the-Fields in which Jeffrey Archer was the auctioneer. Newley's portrait of David Suchet, revealed at the Garrick Club in October 2016, now hangs in the most esteemed spot in the Garrick bar.

His multilayered "Head of Lincoln" is the central feature at The Lincoln Heritage Museum in Lincoln, Illinois—an Abraham Lincoln museum. Newley also painted a portrait of Jeffrey Archer hiding his face behind his hands. Newley's portrait of writer Dominick Dunne scribbling in his notebook during his coverage for Vanity Fair of the O. J. Simpson trial in Los Angeles was chosen for the cover of Dunne's best-selling memoir about the trial, Another City, Not My Own.

Newley works mainly in pastels and oils.

== Personal life ==
Newley has one daughter with Angela Tassoni; the couple are now divorced. In 2025, Newley married singer-songwriter Sheela Raman.

In 2017, Newley completed his memoir Unaccompanied Minor, illustrated with 28 of his own paintings, an account of growing up within a dysfunctional family as the son of two international stars.
