= Lippy Lou =

British recording artist (born 1975)

- Born: Louise Neale; 12 July 1975 (age 51)
- Genres: Ragga, dance, toasting
- Occupations: Singer, songwriter
- Years active: 1995–1996
- Label: More Protein

Lippy Lou (born Louise Neale; 12 July 1975) is a British recording artist who had a brief recording career in the mid-1990s.

== Career ==
In 1995, Lippy Lou released two singles, "Liberation" and "Freaks", on Boy George's More Protein label. Both singles were produced by Mike Koglin, and entered the UK top 100 singles chart.

"Liberation" was described by Billboard as a "coming out anthem." The chorus of "Freaks" was based on the Was (Not Was) song "Out Come the Freaks". Although Lippy Lou made further recordings, an album was not released.

== Discography ==
=== Singles ===
Year	Single	Peak chart positions	
Year	Single	UK	AUS
1995	"Liberation"	57	102
1995	"Freaks"	76	121
1996	"Liberation (The Comeback Mixes)"	116	—
"—" denotes releases that did not chart or were not released in that country.
