= Generations of Love =

Single by Jesus Loves You featuring MC Kinky

from the album The Martyr Mantras
- Released: 1990 (Land of Oz Mix); 1991 (La La Gone Gaga Mix)
- Recorded: 1990
- Genre: Dance-pop; Balearic beat; deep house; ragga
- Length: 4:58 (Land of Oz Mix); 4:00 (La La Gone Gaga Mix); 7:13 (Oakenfold Mix)
- Label: More Protein
- Songwriters: Angela Dust; Caron Geary; Simon Rogers
- Producers: Simon Rogers; Bruce Forest; Paul Oakenfold

Jesus Loves You featuring MC Kinky singles chronology
"After the Love" (1989)	"Generations of Love" (1990)	"Bow Down Mister" (1991)

Music video
- "Generations of Love" on YouTube

"Generations of Love" is a song by British band Jesus Loves You, founded by singer Boy George, and was released by label More Protein as the second single from their only album, The Martyr Mantras (1990). The song also features raggamuffin toaster MC Kinky and is written by George, MC Kinky and Simon Rogers, who co-produced. It received favorable reviews from most music critics; both Melody Maker and NME named it Single of the Week. "Generations of Love" made the UK Singles Chart in two versions; the "Land of Oz Mix" which peaked at number 80 in 1990 and the "La La Gone Gaga Mix" which peaked at number 35 in 1991. The 1990 version also peaked at number 11 on the US Billboard Hot Dance Club Play chart, while the 1991 version became a top-10 hit in Israel and on the UK Dance Singles chart, a top-20 hit in the Netherlands and a top-30 hit in Austria and Belgium. Its accompanying music video was directed by Baillie Walsh.

British electronic music and clubbing magazine Mixmag ranked "Generations of Love" number 100 in its "100 Greatest Dance Singles of All Time" list in 1996. In 2016, a new version was released by Phunk Investigation with Boy George's vocals, and remixed by Cristian Poow and Tom Novy.

== Critical reception ==
Bill Coleman from Billboard magazine wrote, "If the vocals sound familiar, they should—since track is actually the latest from former pop darling Boy George. Brilliantly conceived deep house jam has already set U.K. dancefloors on fire. Similar results can be expected here." The magazine's Larry Flick added, "This is arguably among the true, timeless gems of the singer's career, with its politically relevant and emotionally charged lyrics—not to mention its fist-waving performance." Jim Farber from Entertainment Weekly remarked, "Simultaneously fey and determined, he conveys a tender reassurance and an emphatic strength. Just as emotionally nuanced are the synthesized bass lines that dominate the record." He also noted that they create "a hypnotic groove, reminiscent of the extended soul tracks pioneered by Isaac Hayes and Curtis Mayfield in the early '70s." Irish Evening Herald stated that George is "in splendid voice". Dave Sholin from the Gavin Report wrote, "Addressing human injustice with a message of hope and love, Boy George rejuvenates his career thanks to a beautiful melody and a superb singing performance." Pakistan's The Herald said that "good old Boy George is back with a new posse and (thankfully) minus the gender-bender hype. Tuneful, energetic with lots going on in the background and up front."

Andrew Smith from Melody Maker named it Single of the Week and "a brooding, deep blue masterpiece of a song. In feel it's like a mantra; mesmeric and generous, built on shuffling rhythms and repetitious, funky, dubbed-out bass. [...] From the opening marimba flurries to the poignant, percussive fade at the end, 'Generations' is a force that's impossible to resist." In his album-review, he praised the song as "gorgeously melancholic". David Giles from Music Week felt the 1990-version is "reflecting the gentler "vibes" on the dancefloor at present and hinting at the impending reggae influence this summer." The magazine's James Hamilton described the 1991 remix as a "flamenco/ragga rap" fusion, naming it Pick of the Week in the category of Dance. Upon the release of the 1996 remix, Brad Beatnik gave it a score of four out of five, adding, "Nice, very nice." Barbara Ellen from NME also named it Single of the Week, writing, "Everything is here, from the mad raving of that queen of freaks MC Kinky, to a Balearic buzz that echoes The Gypsy Kings to an eerie evocation of Indian spirituality. Best of all, 'Generations of Love' positively oozes joie de vivre, mocking the listener's complacency with its air of celebration. This will definitely be a massive hit in the clubs but as far as the chart proper is concerned it's up to you. Go on, buy this record, do the right thing for once in your lives." Another editor, Betty Page, complimented it as "full, smooth and richly satisfying". Phil Cheeseman from Record Mirror found that the song "set the pace for a series of mellow, house-inspired grooves that are just as likely to work in your living room as the club environments they were designed for." Caroline Sullivan from Smash Hits described it as a "glossy, understated dance tune".

== Impact and legacy ==
British electronic dance and clubbing magazine Mixmag ranked "Generations of Love" number 100 in its "100 Greatest Dance Singles of All Time" list in 1996, noting that "the gently rolling flamenco guitars and warm Mediterranean vocals saw dance floors turn to slush in its wake."

== Music video ==
The music video for "Generations of Love" was directed by British music video and film director Baillie Walsh.

An uncensored 7-minute short movie named "Generations of Love" was also made by the band. It features Boy George, Talullah and Leigh Bowery. The film was shot in and around Soho, London, and was produced to promote the single. The short film gives an intriguing snapshot into London’s Soho nightlife during 1990 (still hungover from the late-1980s) by way of capturing the bustling local outdoor streets, and the inside of long-gone amusement arcades and porn cinemas. Talullah, in a wig, plays the role of a straight office-type punter, looking for a quick trick, who ends up pulling a transvestite hooker. They visit a Soho dark porn cinema, where business is dealt. Boy George appears in the film briefly in drag and as himself. The movie has a classic early Andy Warholesque feel to it.

A second, performance-only video was subsequently directed by Zelda Barron who had previously worked with George when she directed the "I'll Tumble 4 Ya" music video for his band Culture Club, and several others.

== Track listing ==
- 12", UK (1990)

A. "Generations of Love" (Land Of Oz 12" Mix) – 7:05
B. "Generations of Love" (Future Dub) – 5:34

- 12" - Remix, UK (1990)

A. "Generations of Love" (The 70's Mix) – 6:09
B1. "Generations of Love" (The Jazz Mix) – 6:08
B2. "Generations of Love" (The Ambient Mix) – 5:58

- CD single, UK (1990)
1. "Generations of Love" (Land Of Oz 7" Mix) – 4:58
2. "Generations of Love" (Land Of Oz 12" Mix) – 7:15
3. "Generations of Love" (The 80's Mix) – 7:47
- 7" single, UK (1991)

A. "Generations of Love" (La La Gone Gaga Mix)
B. "Generations of Love" (Land Of Oz 7" Mix)

- 12" vinyl, UK (1991)

A. "Generations of Love" (Totally Outed Mix)
B1. "Generations of Love" (90's Corporeal Mix)
B2. "Generations of Love" (Land Of Oz 12" Mix)

- CD single, Europe (1991)
1. "Generations of Love" (La La Gone Gaga Mix) – 3:59
2. "Generations of Love" (Totally Outed Mix) – 7:04
3. "Generations of Love" (Bodhisattva Mix) – 6:11
- 12", UK (1996)

A1. "Generations of Love" (Cheap Spanish Wine Vocal Mix)
A2. "Generations of Love" (Can't Una Copa Dub)
AA1. "Generations of Love" (Disco Rumproller)
AA2. "Generations of Love" (Soho Sleaze)
AA3. "Generations of Love" (Mother's Leftovers)

- CD maxi-single, Sweden (1997)
1. "Generations of Love" (Cheap Spanish Wine Vocal Mix)
2. "Generations of Love" (Can't Una Copa Dub)
3. "Generations of Love" (Disco Rumproller)
4. "Generations of Love" (Soho Sleaze)
5. "Generations of Love" (Mother's Leftovers)
- CD maxi-single, Germany (1998)
1. "Generations of Love" (Scream Radio Mix) – 4:26
2. "Generations of Love" (La La Gone Gaga Mix) – 3:58
3. "Generations of Love" (De-Phazz Radio Mix) – 3:38
4. "Generations of Love" (Dharma Bums Vocal Mix) – 6:43
5. "Generations of Love" (Mothers Vocal Mix) – 5:24
6. "Generations of Love" (Land Of Oz Mix By Paul Oakenfold) – 6:23
7. "Generations of Love" (Timewriter Bootleg Mix) – 8:49
8. "Generations of Love" (Andrew Wooden Remix) – 6:51
9. "Generations of Love" (Airscape Sensation Mix) – 5:12
10. "Generations of Love" (De-Phazz Dub Mix) – 5:33

== Charts ==
=== Weekly charts ===
Chart (1990)	Peak position
Australia (ARIA)	145
UK Singles (OCC)	80
US Hot Dance Club Play (Billboard)	11

Chart (1991)	Peak position
Austria (Ö3 Austria Top 40)	30
Belgium (Ultratop Flanders)	27
Israel (Israeli Singles Chart)	8
Netherlands (Dutch Top 40)	12
Netherlands (Single Top 100)	12
UK Singles (OCC)	35
UK Airplay (Music Week)	21
UK Dance (Music Week)	9
UK Club Chart (Record Mirror)	9

Chart (1996)	Peak position
UK Dance (OCC)	35

Chart (1998)	Peak position
Belgium Dance (Ultratop)	5

=== Year-end charts ===
Chart (1991)	Position
Netherlands (Dutch Top 40)	100
