= Jesus Loves You (band) =

UK musical group

- Origin: United Kingdom
- Genres: Electronic dance music; pop; Indian classical music
- Years active: 1989–1992
- Labels: More Protein, Virgin
- Past members: Boy George; Richard Cottle; Tony Spiker; Colin Eliot; Jon Quarmby; John Themis

Jesus Loves You were a British band, founded by singer Boy George. The band's music is a mixture of electronic dance music, Indian classical music and western pop music. Their lyrics are about love, spirituality and the equality of all human beings.

== History ==
After the band Culture Club broke up, Boy George started a solo career. He succeeded with the singles taken from his debut album Sold in 1987. For the next two albums, Tense Nervous Headache (1988) and Boyfriend (1989), he wanted to break out in a new direction, by dabbling in electronic dance music. The singles taken from the two albums did not attain much commercial success, but they were often played at clubs.

Boy George founded the band Jesus Loves You, as a collective project with other musicians, under his own label More Protein, which aimed to be an underground label and not meant to release music for the charts. George adopted the pseudonym Angela Dust. "After the Love", the first song by Jesus Loves You that was released as a single, is about the separation from his ex-bandmate Jon Moss, drummer of Culture Club, and the two artists wrote it together.

The first three singles by the band only had modest success in the UK Singles Chart. On a journey across India, Boy George got to know better the Hare Krishna movement. He was impressed with the Hare Krishna philosophy, and as a result he wrote the song "Bow Down Mister". This was a crucial turning point for the band, because it was their first religious song. It was released as a single in 1991 and it became a hit in the United Kingdom – with a peak of No. 27 (their highest position), France, Switzerland, Germany and most notably in Austria – where it peaked at No. 2 on the Ö3 Austria Top 40 chart.

Because of this success, the band's debut album, The Martyr Mantras, was released in the same year. Meanwhile, Boy George felt more and more grateful to Hare Krishna. The religion helped him to conquer his heroin addiction, he said.

In late 1991, remixes of "Generations of Love" and "After the Love" were released as singles.

In July 1992, the band performed before 35,000 people at the Luzhniki Stadium, in Moscow, Russia, during a Hare Krishna festival (the festival also took place in Saint Petersburg, Russia; Riga, Latvia; and Kyiv, Ukraine, but the band only participated in the Moscow event).

In December 1992, the release of the second album, Popularity Breeds Contempt, was planned. The single "Sweet Toxic Love" (with "Am I Losing Control" as B-side) was pre-released, but the record company Virgin Records was so disappointed in the chart positions of the single that the album was not released. The remaining songs that were recorded for the album have since been released. The band dissolved a short time later.

In 2005, a white label 12" and a one-sided promo 12" were released in the summer, using the Jesus Loves You pseudonym. The track was called "Love Your Brother". On the information sheet included with the white label, it suggested to "expect an album in September", but that never materialised.

In 2026, a digital EP, "I've Got What You Need", was released by Boy George using the "Jesus Loves You" moniker.

== Discography ==
=== Albums ===
Year	Album	Chart positions			
Year	Album	UK	AUS	AUT	GER
1990	The Martyr Mantras	60	136	13	44

=== Singles ===
Year	Single	Chart positions								Version (A-side)
Year	Single	UK	AUS	AUT	BEL (FLA)	FRA	GER	NED	SWI	Version (A-side)
1989	"After the Love"	68	160	–	–	–	–	–	–	10 Glorious Years Mix
1990	"Generations of Love"	80	145	–	–	–	–	–	–	Land of Oz Mix
1990	"One on One"	83	–	–	–	–	–	–	–	Fon Force Mix
1991	"Bow Down Mister"	27	142	2	44	29	6	–	15	A Small Portion 2 B Polite Mix
1991	"Generations of Love"	35	–	30	27	–	–	12	–	La La Gone Gaga Mix
1991	"After the Love"	77	–	–	–	–	–	–	–	Naughty Norman Normal's Nightie Edit
1992	"Sweet Toxic Love"	65	–	14	–	–	51	–	–	Deliverance Mix

Note: No single was released in the United States. The album The Martyr Mantras was released as a Boy George album in the United States, and not as Jesus Loves You.

== See also ==
- List of house music artists
- List of soul musicians
- List of Virgin Records artists
