= E-Zee Possee =

English electronic music group

- Origin: London, England
- Genres: Electronic; hip hop; house; trip hop; acid house
- Years active: 1989–1991
- Labels: More Protein, Virgin Records
- Past members: Caron Geary

E-Zee Possee were an English electronic music group, active between 1989 and 1991, made up of vocalists and musicians, and led by MC Kinky. She was a rapper and friend of Boy George, and E-Zee Possee were promoted by George's label, More Protein.

== Career ==
Born Caron Geary, MC Kinky had previously collaborated with Boy George, in particular the toasting section of the original version of "Kipsy", which was included in George's second solo album, Tense Nervous Headache (1988). A different mix of that song, is contained in the four CD box set entitled Culture Club - Box Set (2002). Another collaboration between the female toaster and George was represented by the co-writing of "Generations Of Love", the opening track of George's fourth studio album, Jesus Loves You - The Martyr Mantras. It was jointly composed by George (under the pseudonym of Angela Dust), record producer Simon Rogers and Geary.

The first single by E-Zee Possee was co-written by MC Kinky, (Boy George writing as) Angela Dust and Simon Rogers, along with Jeremy Healy, co-producer of the track (the other co-producer on the song being Rogers himself).

"Everything Starts With an 'E'", E-Zee Possee's biggest chart success, was originally released in the summer of 1989, and peaked at #69 in the UK Singles Chart, leaving the chart after only one week. However, the single was re-released less than a year later, in March 1990 and climbed to #15 on the UK chart. It remained in the chart for eight weeks, making it the longest chart running for the band. The group released two more singles, "The Sun Machine" (1990) and "Breathing is E-Zee" (1991, and credited to E-Zee Possee featuring Tara Newley), which both failed commercially, reaching #62 and #72 in the UK, respectively. In between was "Love On Love", chronologically the group’s second single, which reached #59. The possee also released an album in 1992, containing all these singles, entitled "The Bone Dance".

"Everything Starts With an 'E'" was a controversial track due to its lyrics, explicitly dealing with drugs, and in particular ecstasy. MC Kinky noted that the song was banned by BBC Radio 1 when it was released because of the lyrics.

== Chart singles ==
Year	Single	Highest position	Weeks in chart
1989	"Everything Starts with an 'E'"	69	1
1990	"Love On Love"	59	3
1990	"Everything Starts with an 'E'" (re-entry)	15	8
1990	"The Sun Machine"	62	3
1991	"Breathing Is E-Zee"	72	1
