= More Protein =

Record label

More Protein is a record label started by Boy George and Jeremy Healy in 1989. It was created after finding a label to release the Jeremy Healy produced E-Zee Possee song Everything Starts With an 'E', which attained notoriety through its explicit discussion of drugs, proved impossible.

== Acts ==
- Boy George
  - Jesus Loves You
- MC Kinky
- Eve Gallagher
- Lippy Lou
- Jagdeep Singh
- E-Zee Possee
- I-Sus Ad
- The Twin
- Amos
