= Paul Caplin =

British entrepreneur and musician (born 1954)

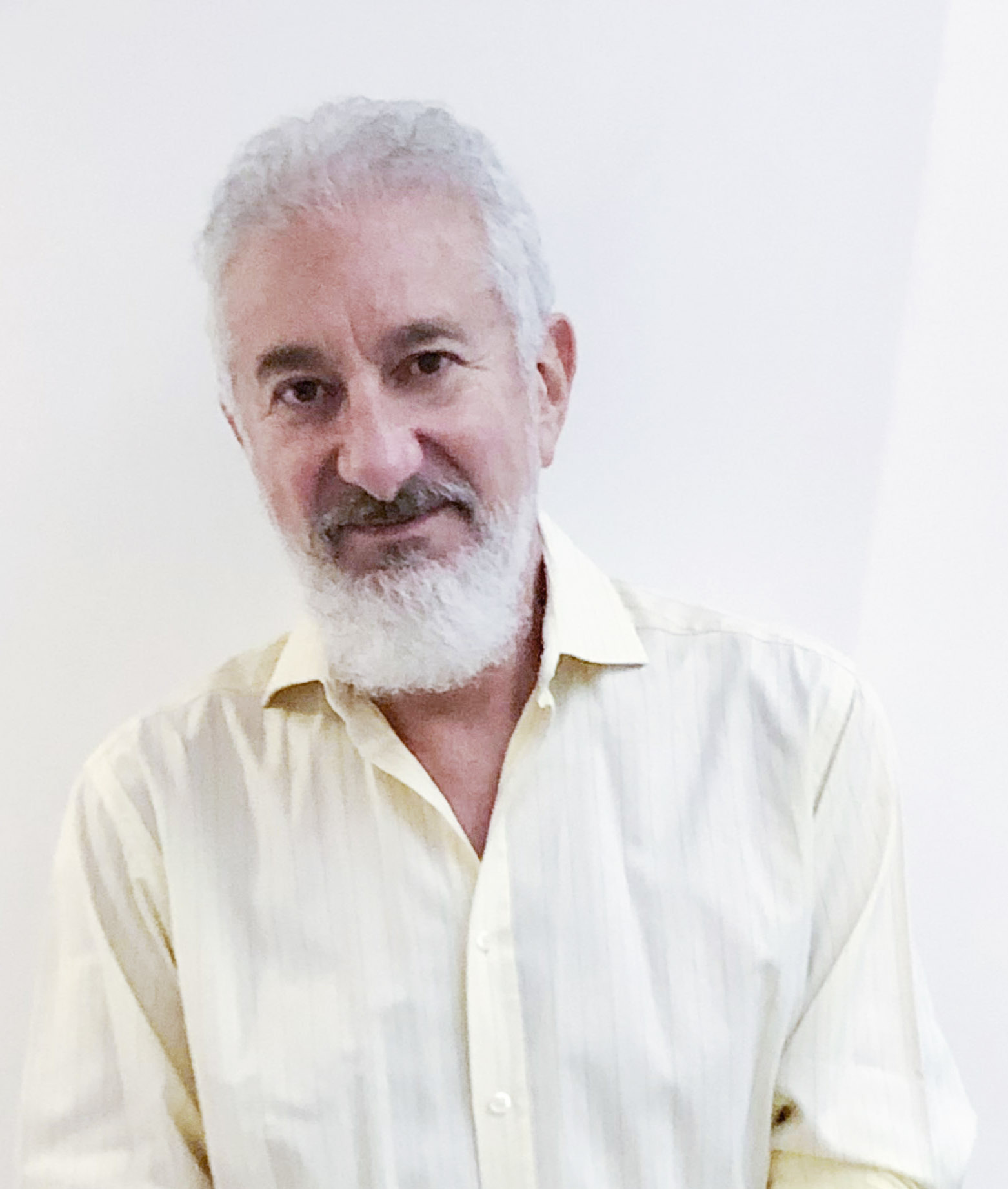
- Caplin in 2022
- Born: 31 December 1954 (age 71); London, England
- Occupations: Musician; songwriter; record producer; technology entrepreneur; businessman
- Years active: 1978–present
- Spouse: Zeeteah Massiah
- Musical career
- Member of: Caplin & Massiah
- Formerly of: Haysi Fantayzee Animal Magnet
- Website: caplinandmassiah.com

Paul Caplin (born 31 December 1954) is an English businessman, musician, songwriter, producer, videographer and technology entrepreneur. He studied mathematics at Imperial College, London and at Cambridge University. His career has spanned music, information technology and filmmaking.

== Early musical career ==
Caplin began his musical career in his early twenties as a founding member of the New Romantic rock group Animal Magnet, which was signed to EMI Records and supported Duran Duran on their first national tour.

He left Animal Magnet to become the “mastermind” behind the 1980s avant-garde new wave pop project Haysi Fantayzee, the other members being Jeremy Healy and Caplin's then girlfriend, Kate Garner. Their music combined reggae, country, and electro with political and sociological lyrics couched as nursery rhymes.

The group disbanded after releasing three hit singles, and an album that went gold. Caplin then launched his own record label, The Love Organization. This had success with Marilyn, who became popular during the mid-1980s vogue for sexually ambivalent pop stars. Caplin managed Marilyn and co-wrote his hit songs.

== Business career ==
After creating and running a small group of music production and publishing companies in the early 1980s, in 1985 Caplin founded Caplin Cybernetics Corporation, a computer hardware and software developer and a pioneer of artificial intelligence technology.

Caplin Cybernetics became an IBM business partner and was later acquired by the Infinet Group, a diversified group of IT services companies of which Caplin was co-founder and chief executive.

Caplin was also active in filmmaking, and in 1994 was executive producer of the documentary Pavarotti in Confidence with Peter Ustinov for the BBC.

In 2000, Caplin founded FinTech innovator Caplin Systems Ltd and served as its chief executive and chairman until 2015. Caplin Systems pioneered the distribution of real-time financial data via the web, and built some of the earliest online trading platforms for investment banks.

In 2001, he received an Ernst & Young Entrepreneur of the Year award, and in both 2002 and 2009 Caplin Systems was featured in the Sunday Times Tech Track 100 as one of the fastest-growing technology firms in Britain.

In 2015, Caplin Systems was acquired by Ion Capital Management, at which point Caplin stepped down from his role at the company and returned to music making as an independent artist.

== Recent musical career ==
Since 2015, Caplin has been working with the singer Zeeteah Massiah, for whom he has written and produced three albums: Juice (2014), Maybe Tomorrow (2016) and Wat A Ting (2022).

The two were married in 2016, and in 2024 they launched themselves as the music duo as Caplin & Massiah. They have released three singles and an album under this name to significant critical acclaim. In 2025 Wat a Ting was rebranded as a Caplin & Massiah album, passing a million streams on Spotify soon afterwards.

== Personal life ==
Caplin married singer Zeeteah Massiah in 2016. They each have a child by an earlier relationship.
