= Jeremy Healy =

English musician (born 1962)

- Born: Jeremiah Healy; 18 January 1962 (age 64); Woolwich, London, England
- Genres: Pop; electronica; new wave
- Occupations: Record producer; songwriter; DJ; keyboardist
- Years active: 1981–present
- Spouse: Patsy Kensit (m. 2009; div. 2010)

Jeremy Healy (born Jeremiah Healy, 18 January 1962) is an English DJ and singer. He is a former member of 1980s pop group Haysi Fantayzee.

== Career ==
Healy was born in Woolwich, South London. In the 1980s, with Paul Caplin and Kate Garner, he formed pop group Haysi Fantayzee. He also acted as co-songwriter and co-producer for E-Zee Possee and Bleachin'. In addition, he worked with Gwen Stefani on the mashup for her "Wind It Up" single.

He was voted 'number one DJ' by The Face and Mixmag magazines. Healy worked as producer and did sound effects for the video for Duran Duran's Arena (An Absurd Notion), and has remixed work by both Boy George and George Michael. He had a cameo role playing himself in a 2004 film, Chasing Liberty.

2004 saw the launch of Healy's latest recording project, Seraphim Suite, collaborating with a variety of featured vocalists including Mica Paris on the first single "Heart" (Inferno Records). His disc jockey duties between 2004 and 2006 included residencies with Miss Moneypenny's in Ibiza and Cyprus, plus regular UK dates with Empire, Love to Be, Time Flies, Syndicate, Kool Waters, Naughty But Nice, and overseas events in Dubai, the Mediterranean, the United States and Brazil. He continued his involvement with fashion designers Dior and Galliano, and with the Victoria's Secret fashion house (he has been musical director for every annual VS show from 2001 onwards), plus the Pret a Porter International Fashion Fair in Paris.

In 2007, Healy undertook the musical director's role for Gwen Stefani's Lamb fashion label, The Golden Age of Couture at the Victoria and Albert Museum in London, Naomi Campbell's Fashion For Relief, the Parisian jewellers Chaumet, plus the launch of J-Lo's fashion wear. 2007 saw production credits on a Gwen Stefani album and remix credits for "Wind It Up".

== Personal life ==
On 29 November 2007, an announcement was made that Healy and Patsy Kensit were to marry. However, on 31 March 2008 it was reported that the pair had "mutually" split and called off their wedding. The pair eventually married on Saturday 18 April 2009, but in April 2010 were reported to be separating.
