= Boy George discography =

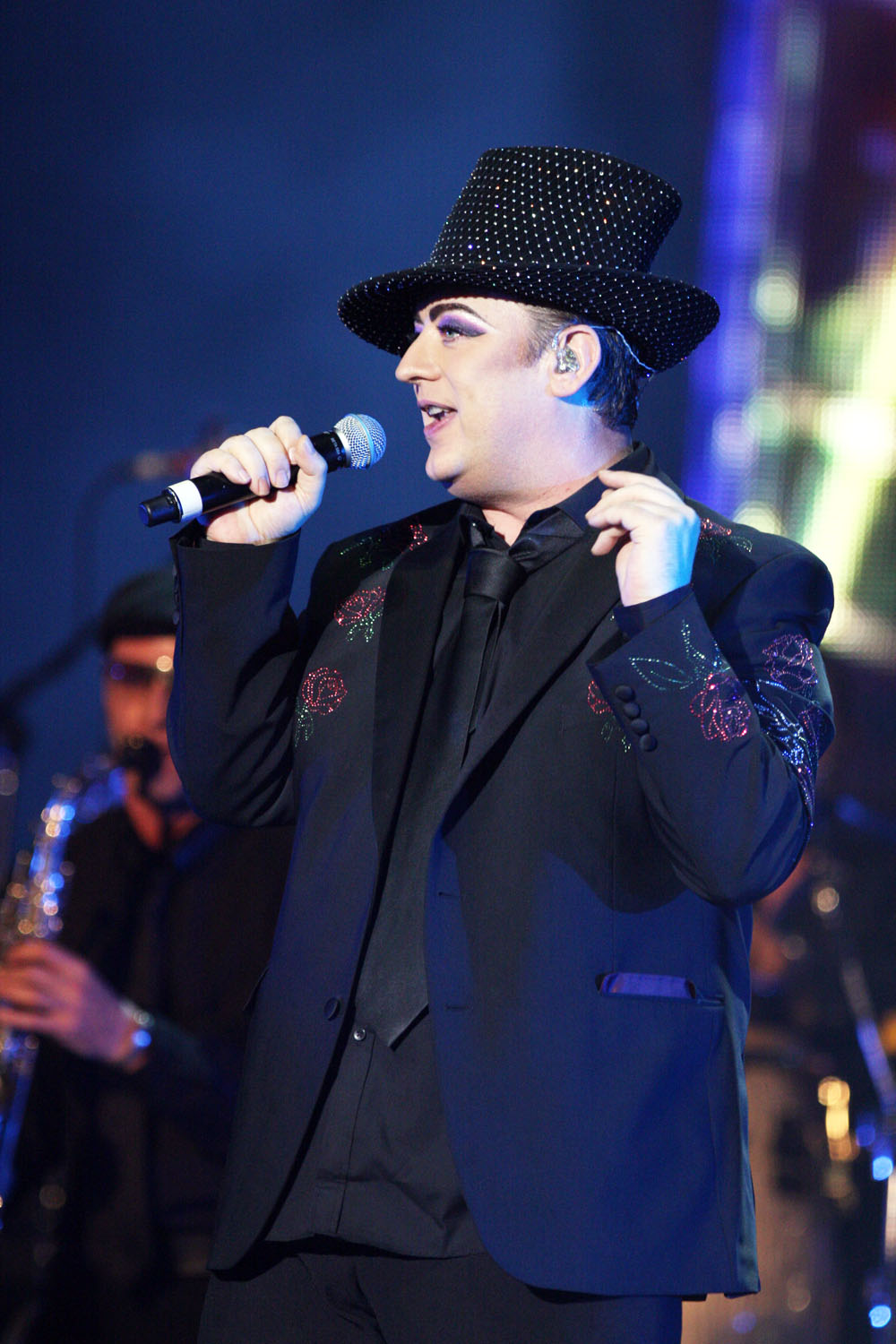
- Boy George in Australia 2011
- Studio albums: 11
- Extended plays: 3
- Soundtrack albums: 1
- Compilation albums: 5
- Singles: 48
- DJ albums: 7

As a solo artist, English singer Boy George has released eleven studio albums, five compilation albums and forty-eight singles. The vocalist has also released seven DJ albums, three EPs and a soundtrack album.

Boy George was born as George Alan O'Dowd on 14 June 1961 in Bexley, London, England. The singer was essentially part of the English New Romantic movement which emerged in the early 1980s. He helped give androgyny an international stage with the success of Culture Club during the 1980s. His music is often classified as blue-eyed soul, influenced by rhythm and blues and reggae. Between 1989 and 1992, he also founded and was lead singer of Jesus Loves You, which performed house and dance music. In the 1990s and 2000s, Boy George's solo music reveals also glam rock influences such as David Bowie and Iggy Pop. Being involved in many activities (among them songwriting, DJing, writing books, designing clothes and photography), he has released fewer music recordings in the 21st century.

== Albums ==
=== Studio albums ===
Year	Title	Peak chart positions										Certifications (sales thresholds)
Year	Title	UK	AUT	FRA	GER	ITA	NLD	NOR	SWE	SWI	US	Certifications (sales thresholds)
1987	Sold	29	—	—	—	4	51	15	18	15	145	UK: Silver
1988	Tense Nervous Headache	—	—	—	—	38	—	—	46	—	—	
1989	Boyfriend	—	—	—	—	—	—	—	—	—	—	
1990	The Martyr Mantras	60	13	—	16	—	—	—	—	—	—	
1995	Cheapness and Beauty	44	—	—	—	—	—	—	—	—	—	
1998	The Unrecoupable One Man Bandit	—	—	—	—	—	—	—	—	—	—	
2002	U Can Never B2 Straight	—	—	—	—	—	—	—	—	—	—	
2010	Ordinary Alien	—	—	—	—	—	—	—	—	—	—	
2013	This Is What I Do	33	61	58	56	—	—	—	—	—	—	
2018	Life (with Culture Club)	12	—	—	58	66	—	—	—	89	—	
2020	This Is What I Dub, Vol.1	—	—	—	—	—	—	—	—	—	—	
2021	Cool Karaoke, Vol.1	—	—	—	—	—	—	—	—	—	—	
2025	SE18	—	—	—	—	—	—	—	—	—	—	
"—" denotes releases that failed to chart or were not released.

=== Compilation albums ===
Year	Album details	Peak chart positions					Certifications (sales thresholds)
Year	Album details	UK	AUS	AUT	FRA	US	Certifications (sales thresholds)
1989	High Hat	—	126	—	—	126	
1992	Spin Dazzle – The Best of Boy George and Culture Club	—	122	36	—	—	
1993	At Worst... The Best of Boy George and Culture Club	24	185	—	13	169	UK: Silver; FRA: Gold
1996	Everything I Own	—	—	—	—	—	
2002	Classic Masters	—	—	—	—	—	
"—" denotes releases that failed to chart or were not released.

=== DJ albums ===
- 1995: The House Collection, Volume 2 (Disc one)
- 1995: Poptartz (Disc three)
- 1995: The Annual (Disc one)
- 1996: Dance Nation (Disc two) (Engineered by Charlie Brook)
- 1996: Dance Nation Part Two (Disc two)
- 1996: The Annual II (Disc two) (Engineered by Charlie Brook)
- 1997: Dance Nation 4 (Disc two) (Engineered by Paul Morris)
- 1997: The Annual III (Disc two) (Engineered by Paul Morris)
- 1998: Dance Nation 5 (Disc two) (Engineered by Paul Morris)
- 1998: The Ibiza Annual (Disc two) (Engineered by Paul Morris)
- 1998: The Annual IV (Disc two) (Engineered by Paul Morris)
- 1999: Galaxy Weekend (Disc one) (Engineered by Paul Morris)
- 1999: Galaxy Mix
- 2000: The Annual - 1999-2000 (Disc two)
- 2001: Essential Mix
- 2001: BoyGeorgeDj.com
- 2001: Lucky for Some
- 2002: Something Old, Something New – A More Protein Compilation
- 2002: A Night Out with Boy George – A DJ Mix
- 2002: A Night In with Boy George – A Chillout Mix

=== Soundtracks ===
- 2002: Taboo – Original London Cast

=== EPs ===
Year	Album details	UK
1994	The Devil in Sister George EP	26
2005	Straight	—
2012	King of Queens	—
"—" denotes releases that failed to chart or were not released.

== Singles ==
=== Solo singles ===
Year	Title	Peak chart positions										Album
Year	Title	UK	AUT	BEL	GER	IRE	NLD	NOR	SWE	SWI	US	Album
1987	"Everything I Own"	1	10	2	4	1	4	1	14	8	—	Sold
1987	"Keep Me in Mind"	29	—	—	55	21	—	—	—	—	—	Sold
1987	"Sold"	24	—	26	—	8	19	—	—	—	—	Sold
1987	"To Be Reborn"	13	—	22	—	8	55	—	—	—	—	Sold
1988	"Live My Life"	62	—	—	—	—	—	—	—	—	40	Hiding Out (Original Motion Picture Soundtrack)
1988	"No Clause 28"	57	—	38	—	—	—	—	—	—	—	Boyfriend
1988	"Don't Cry"	60	—	—	—	—	—	—	—	—	—	Tense Nervous Headache
1988	"Something Strange Called Love"	—	—	—	—	—	—	—	—	—	—	Tense Nervous Headache
1989	"Don't Take My Mind on a Trip"	68	—	—	—	—	—	—	—	—	—	Boyfriend
1989	"You Found Another Guy"	—	—	—	—	—	—	—	—	—	—	Boyfriend
1989	"Whether They Like It or Not"	—	—	—	—	—	—	—	—	—	—	Boyfriend
1989	"Whisper"	—	—	—	—	—	—	—	—	—	—	High Hat
1990	"One on One"	83	—	—	—	—	—	—	—	—	—	The Martyr Mantras
1991	"Bow Down Mister"	27	2	44	6	—	—	—	—	15	—	The Martyr Mantras
1991	"Generations of Love"	35	30	27	—	—	12	—	—	—	—	The Martyr Mantras
1992	"Sweet Toxic Love/Am I Losing Control"	65	—	—	—	—	—	—	—	—	—	single only
1992	"The Crying Game"	22	—	—	68	26	—	—	32	—	15	The Crying Game: Original Motion Picture Soundtrack
1995	"Funtime"	45	—	—	—	—	—	—	—	—	—	Cheapness and Beauty
1995	"Il Adore"	50	—	—	—	—	—	—	—	—	—	Cheapness and Beauty
1995	"Same Thing in Reverse"	56	—	—	—	—	—	—	—	—	—	Cheapness and Beauty
1996	"Sad"/"Satan's Butterfly Ball"	—	—	—	—	—	—	—	—	—	—	Cheapness and Beauty
1996	"Love Is Leaving"	—	—	—	—	—	—	—	—	—	—	single only
1998	"When Will You Learn"	—	—	—	—	—	—	—	—	—	—	single only
2008	"Yes We Can"	—	—	—	—	—	—	—	—	—	—	Ordinary Alien
2009	"White Xmas"	—	—	—	—	—	—	—	—	—	—	single only
2010	"Amazing Grace"	—	—	—	—	—	—	—	—	—	—	Ordinary Alien
2011	"Turn 2 Dust"	—	—	—	—	—	—	—	—	—	—	Ordinary Alien
2013	"King of Everything"	—	—	—	—	—	—	—	—	—	—	This Is What I Do
2014	"My God"	—	—	—	—	—	—	—	—	—	—	This Is What I Do
2014	"Nice and Slow"	—	—	—	—	—	—	—	—	—	—	This Is What I Do
2018	"Life"	—	—	—	—	—	—	—	—	—	—	Life (with Culture Club)
2020	"Rainbow in the Dark" (featuring Asaf Goren)	—	—	—	—	—	—	—	—	—	—	singles only
2020	"Mercy Now"	—	—	—	—	—	—	—	—	—	—	singles only
2020	"What Would You Call Unreasonable"	—	—	—	—	—	—	—	—	—	—	singles only
2021	"Shine On" (with Kim Wilde)	—	—	—	—	—	—	—	—	—	—	Pop Don't Stop
2021	"I Feel Like I Won the Lottery"	—	—	—	—	—	—	—	—	—	—	singles only
2021	"Swoon"	—	—	—	—	—	—	—	—	—	—	singles only
2021	"Bacteria"	—	—	—	—	—	—	—	—	—	—	singles only
2022	"The Power of Not Knowing"	—	—	—	—	—	—	—	—	—	—	singles only
2022	"Let Somebody Love You" (Remixes)	—	—	—	—	—	—	—	—	—	—	singles only
2024	"You're Not the One" (with Kinky Roland)	—	—	—	—	—	—	—	—	—	—	singles only
2024	"Smalltown Boy"	—	—	—	—	—	—	—	—	—	—	singles only
2024	"Electric Energy" (with Ariana DeBose and Nile Rodgers)	— (Note: "Electric Energy" did not enter the UK Singles Chart Top 100 but debuted at number 18 on the UK Singles Downloads Chart Top 100.)	—	—	—	—	—	—	—	—	—	Argylle (Soundtrack from the Apple Original Film)
2024	"Let the Flowers Grow" (with Peter Murphy)	—	—	—	—	—	—	—	—	—	—	singles only
2024	"London Lingo"	—	—	—	—	—	—	—	—	—	—	singles only
2024	"Religion"	—	—	—	—	—	—	—	—	—	—	singles only
2024	"Them There Crows"	—	—	—	—	—	—	—	—	—	—	singles only
2026	"We Will Dance Again" (Note: Song released exclusively on Instagram and X, and briefly on Bandcamp)	—N/a	—N/a	—N/a	—N/a	—N/a	—N/a	—N/a	—N/a	—N/a	—N/a	singles only
"—" denotes releases that failed to chart or were not released.

=== As featured artist ===
Year	Title	Peak chart positions							Album
Year	Title	UK	BEL	FRA	GER	NLD	SWE	SWI	Album
1993	"More Than Likely" (with P.M. Dawn)	40	—	—	—	—	—	—	The Bliss Album...?
1994	"Human Beings" (with Gaurangi)	—	—	—	—	—	—	—	singles only
1997	"Police and Thieves" (with Dubversive and Mica Paris)	—	—	—	—	—	—	—	singles only
1998	"I Could Be Someone" (with Dubversive and Mica Paris)	—	—	—	—	—	—	—	Streetwise
1999	"Why Go?" (with Faithless)	—	—	—	—	65	52	—	Sunday 8PM
2002	"Run" (with Sash!)	—	—	—	48	—	—	98	S4!Sash!
2002	"Auto-Erotic" (with Dark Globe)	—	—	—	—	—	—	—	singles only
2003	"Psychology of the Dreamer" (with Eddie Lock)	—	—	—	—	—	—	—	singles only
2003	"Out of Fashion" (with Hi-Gate)	—	—	—	—	—	—	—	Split Personality
2006	"You Are My Sister" (with Antony and the Johnsons)	39	—	190	—	96	—	—	I Am a Bird Now
2007	"You're Not the One" (with Loverush UK!)	—	—	—	—	—	—	—	singles only
2007	"Time Machine" (with Amanda Ghost)	—	—	—	—	—	—	—	singles only
2007	"Atoms" (with Dark Globe)	—	—	—	—	—	—	—	Nostalgia for the Future
2009	"American Heart" (with Bliss)	—	—	—	—	—	—	—	No One Built This Moment
2010	"Someone Else's Eyes" (with Amanda Lear and Deadstar)	—	—	—	—	—	—	—	Brief Encounters Reloaded
2010	"Take Us to the Disco" (with Bylli Crayone)	—	—	—	—	—	—	—	single only
2010	"Somebody to Love Me" (with Mark Ronson and Andrew Wyatt)	55	16	—	—	—	—	—	Record Collection
2012	"Happy" (with DJ Yoda)	—	—	—	—	—	—	—	singles only
2013	"Coming Home" (with Dharma Protocol)	—	—	—	—	—	—	—	singles only
2014	"You Cannot Be Saved" (with Marc Vedo)	—	—	—	—	—	—	—	singles only
2015	"Just Another Guy" (with Vanilla Ace & Katerina Themis)	—	—	—	—	—	—	—	singles only
2016	"Kiss the DJ"	—	—	—	—	—	—	—	singles only
2016	"The Last Breath of the World's Greatest Rock & Roll Love Affair"(with Toilet Böys)	—	—	—	—	—	—	—	singles only
2019	"House of Truth"(with Jamie Hannah)	—	—	—	—	—	—	—	singles only
2019	"Symphony of You" (with Pete Tong & Her-O)	—	—	—	—	—	—	—	Chilled Classics
2020	"Body Control" (with Jamie Jones)	—	—	—	—	—	—	—	Recovery
2022	"London Calling Paris" (Love Rush UK! featuring Boy George)	—	—	—	—	—	—	—	
"—" denotes releases that failed to chart or were not released.
