= U Can Never B2 Straight =

Studio album by Boy George
- Released: 2002
- Recorded: 1991–2002
- Genre: Acoustic; country
- Length: 67:39
- Label: Virgin
- Producer: Kevan Frost; Boy George; John Themis; Jessica Corcoran; Bruce Forest

Boy George chronology
The Unrecoupable One Man Bandit (1999)	U Can Never B2 Straight (2002)	Ordinary Alien (2010)

Professional ratings
Review scores
Source	Rating
AllMusic	4/5 stars
Q	4/5 stars

U Can Never B2 Straight is an album by English singer and songwriter Boy George, released in 2002 by Virgin Records. It includes acoustic songs from George's then-new London play Taboo, new and previously unreleased songs, as well as selected songs taken from his albums Cheapness and Beauty (1995) and The Martyr Mantras (1990), the latter from when George was part of the band Jesus Loves You.

== Album overview ==
The album includes 16 songs (8 previously unreleased), each dedicated to someone in particular or in general. Three songs are dedicated to George's ex-boyfriend Michael Dunne ("If I Could Fly", "Losing Control" and "The Deal"), whereas "Unfinished Business" is for Kirk Brandon (who took George to court for this song, but lost).

The hidden track "Out of Fashion" was taken out as a single in remixed form as a collaboration with dance duo Hi-Gate; a version of the song is also featured on the Taboo musical cast recording. Another track which was released as video-only was the opener "Ich Bin Kunst", a song dealing with the late performance artist Leigh Bowery, a great friend of George's, whose character he took on in his musical. George would re-record the song again as Bowery in a more campy and rock-style arrangement for the 2004 Broadway cast recording of the musical.

U Can Never B2 Straight contains all the acoustic ballads originally on George's 1995 album Cheapness and Beauty, including the single "Il Adore", as well as "Same Thing in Reverse" (a different version from the dance remix which reached No. 1 on the US Billboard Dance Chart). "Same Thing in Reverse" is dedicated in the booklet credits to 'Eminem and all scared, pretty heterosexuals'... The song "Julian", a new song, is also featured on the EP Straight, a CD which was included with George's 2005 autobiography of the same name.

The album also contains the following three tracks: "She Was Never He", taken from the 1999 fan-requested compilation The Unrecoupable One Man Bandit; "Fat Cat", originally on Culture Club's 1999 reunion album Don't Mind If I Do, and the popular Krishna-inspired "Bow Down Mister", which gave George one of his last UK chart successes after splitting from Culture Club.

== Critical reception ==
AllMusic gave the album 4.5 stars out of 5. It also got four stars from Q magazine.

== Track listing ==
No.	Title	Writer(s)	Origin	Length
1.	"Ich Bin Kunst"	Boy George; Kevan Frost	2002; song from the musical Taboo	2:38
2.	"St. Christopher"	Boy George; Frost	2002; new song	3:46
3.	"She Was Never He"	Boy George; John Themis	1996; previously unreleased mixed version	3:33
4.	"Cheapness & Beauty"	Boy George; Themis	1995; acoustic version taken from the "Il Adore" single	3:47
5.	"Fat Cat"	Boy George; Emily Themis	1999; acoustic version	3:24
6.	"If I Could Fly"	Boy George; Themis	1995; from Cheapness and Beauty	4:08
7.	"Unfinished Business"	Boy George; Themis	1995; from Cheapness and Beauty	3:36
8.	"Julian"	Boy George; Frost	2002; new song	3:39
9.	"Wrong"	Boy George; Frost	2002; new song originally from Taboo	4:07
10.	"Letter to a School Friend"	Boy George; Themis	1996; previously unreleased	3:49
11.	"The Deal"	Boy George; Themis	2002; old live favourite, performed circa 1991–93	4:41
12.	"Losing Control"	Boy George; Themis	1992–2002; previously unreleased version adapted from a 1992 Jesus Loves You country demo	3:15
13.	"Same Thing in Reverse"	Boy George; Themis	1995; from Cheapness and Beauty	3:35
14.	"Il Adore"	Boy George; Themis	1995; from Cheapness and Beauty	6:14
15.	"Bow Down Mister"	Boy George	1991; from Jesus Loves You's The Martyr Mantras	6:30

Note

- 28 seconds of silence follows "Bow Down Mister" before hidden track "Out of Fashion" plays, a 2002 acoustic version of a song from Taboo (6:30; writers: Boy George, Paul Masterson, Judge Jules).

== Personnel ==
The personnel and dedications as stated in the liner notes for U Can Never B2 Straight.

"Ich Bin Kunst"

dedicated to Leigh Bowery, Nicola and Christine Bateman

- Boy George – co-production
- Kevan Frost – keyboards, drum programming & brass arrangements; mix at Frosty Bros. Studio (Kev's flat); co-production
- Ben Castle – saxophone & brass arrangements
- Raul D'Olivera – trumpet
- Mike Innes – trombone

"St. Christopher"

dedicated to Chris Manning

- Boy George – co-production
- Kevan Frost – backing vocals, acoustic guitar & brass arrangements; mix at Frosty Bros. Studio (Kev's flat); co-production
- Ben Castle – saxophone & brass arrangements
- Raul D'Olivera – trumpet
- Mike Innes – trombone
- Sharlene Hector – backing vocals

"She Was Never He"

dedicated to Natasha and Jody

- Boy George – co-production
- John Themis – guitars, backing vocals, co-production; mix at Mayfair Studios
- Kevan Frost – backing vocals
- Alan Branch – engineer

"Cheapness & Beauty"

dedicated to all tattooed car thieves – dedicated to Jon Moss

- Jessica Corcoran – production
- John Themis – guitars, backing vocals, strip & remix
- Zee Asha – backing vocals
- Alan Branch – engineer

"Fat Cat"

dedicated to all sexually confused straight boys?

- John Themis – guitars, production; mix at home
- Emily Themis, Katherine Themis – backing vocals

"If I Could Fly"

dedicated to Michael Dunne

- Jessica Corcoran – production
- John Themis – guitars & string arrangements; mix at Abbey Road Studios
- Nick Ingman – string arrangements
- London Chamber Orchestra – strings

"Unfinished Business"

dedicated to Kirk Brandon

- Jessica Corcoran – production & mix
- John Themis – guitars, string arrangements & mix

"Julian"

dedicated to Julian

- Boy George – co-production
- Kevan Frost – acoustic guitar, backing vocals and co-production; mix at Frosty Bros. Studio (Kev's flat)

"Wrong"

dedicated to Luke and all dreamers

- Boy George – co-production
- Kevan Frost – acoustic guitar, bass guitar, backing vocals and co-production; mix at Frosty Bros. Studio (Kev's flat)
- Pete Adams – piano & Hammond
- Liz Chi – Chinese violin "edu" solo
- Joel Pott, Sharlene Hector, John Gibbons – backing vocals

"Letter to a School Friend"

dedicated to Miss Carter and Michael Crome

- John Themis – guitars, production; mix at Mayfair Studios
- Zee Asha, Linda Duggan, Mary Pearse – backing vocals
- Richie Stevens – drums
- Winston Blisset – bass
- Peter Adams – keyboards
- Alan Branch – engineer

"The Deal"

dedicated to Michael Dunne

- Boy George – co-production
- Kevan Frost – acoustic guitar, keyboards, backing vocals and co-production; mix at Frosty Bros. Studio (Kev's flat)
- Liz Chi – violins & violin solo
- Sarah Chi – violins
- Sharlene Hector, John Gibbons – backing vocals

"Losing Control"

dedicated to Michael Dunne

- John Themis – guitars, keyboards, bass, backing vocals, production & mix
- Sugar Hajishakalli – bouzouki
- Andy Kyriacou – drums
- Jimmy "Mixologist" Sarikas – engineer

"Same Thing in Reverse"

dedicated to Eminem and all scared, pretty heterosexuals

- John Themis – guitars, backing vocals
- Zee Asha – backing vocals
- Jessica Corcoran – production & mix

"Il Adore"

dedicated to Stevie Hughes and all the lost boys

- Jessica Corcoran – production
- John Themis – guitars, string arrangements; mix at Abbey Road Studios
- Nick Ingram – string arrangements
- London Chamber Orchestra – strings
- Christopher Warren Green – violin solo

"Bow Down Mister"

dedicated to Lord Krishna and John Richardson & family

- Bruce Forest – production
- Soho Krishna Temple, London Gospel Choir & Basil – special thanks
