= House of Truth =

House of Truth may refer to:

- Congregation Beth Emeth (House of Truth), a Jewish synagogue in New York
- House of Truth (song), 2019 song by Jamie Hannah and Boy George
- House of Truth (Washington, D.C.), an early 20th century political salon in the United States
- The Ghost and the House of Truth, 2019 film by Akin Omotoso
- The House of Truth (professional wrestling), an American professional wrestling stable
