= Paul Baker (actor) =

British actor 20th century

Paul Baker (born 26 April 1967) is British musical theatre actor. He is noted for his roles in Taboo, for which he won his Olivier Award in 2003, and for the 2000 West End Musical Napoleon in the title role.

== Early life and education ==
Baker trained at the Guildford School of Acting and continued collaborating with the school as a teacher of presentation and audition technique.

== Career ==
Baker was part of the cast of Boy George's musical Taboo in 2003 at The Venue as Philip Sallon. For this role he won Best Supporting Actor in a Musical in the 2003 Olivier Awards. In the cast Luke Evans in the role of Billy, Dianne Pilkington as Kim and Matt Lucas as Leigh Bowery. Baker reprised the role in the 2012 version of the show at the Brixton Club House.

In 2003 he joined the cast of Chicago at the Adelphi Theatre as Amos, alongside Ruthie Henshall as Velma and Frances Ruffelle as Roxie.

Baker last appeared in the concert version of A Tale of Two Cities as the evil Marquis St. Evermonde in Brighton, England. He can be seen in the DVD release of the concert.

Year	Show	Role	Theatre
1994-1995	Starlight Express	Rusty	Apollo Victoria
	Carousel		
	Les Miserables	Joly	Palace Theatre
	The Lion King	Zazu and Timon	Lyceum Theatre
2000	Napoleon	Napoleon	Shaftesbury Theatre
2002	Taboo	Philip Sallon	
2003	Chicago	Amos	Adelphi Theatre
2012	Taboo	Philip Sallon	Brixton Club House
