= The Unrecoupable One Man Bandit =

Studio album by Boy George
- Released: 1998
- Recorded: January–June 1996
- Studios: Mayfair Studios, London: Roundhouse, London
- Label: Back Door Records
- Producer: John Themis

Boy George chronology
Cheapness and Beauty (1995)	The Unrecoupable One Man Bandit (1998)	U Can Never B2 Straight (2002)

The Unrecoupable One Man Bandit – Volume One is an album by English singer Boy George, released in 1998. The album's ten tracks were recorded in 1996 and were intended to be included on a follow-up to George's 1995 album Cheapness and Beauty, but it was shelved. The tracks were finally released in 1998 due to popular demand from fans and are presented on the album in demo form, mixed and not fully mixed.

The album includes "She Was Never He", a song that was first performed on late night BBC show Gaytime TV in 1995, as well as a cover version of David Bowie's "Suffragette City".

== Critical reception ==
Professional ratings
Review scores
Source	Rating
AllMusic	3/5 stars

In a review for AllMusic, Ned Raggett gave The Unrecoupable One Man Bandit three out of five stars, describing the album as "an enjoyable romp through a variety of fun rockers, some more pointedly tongue in cheek than others."

== Track listing ==
All songs written by George O'Dowd and John Themis, unless otherwise stated.

No.	Title	Writer(s)	Length
1.	"GI Josephine"		3:29
2.	"Mr. Strange"		3:52
3.	"She Was Never He"		3:34
4.	"Number One"		3:36
5.	"Spooky Truth" (with Eve Gallagher)		3:47
6.	"In Maya"		5:07
7.	"Vanity Case"		3:40
8.	"Broken Spirit"		4:44
9.	"Suffragette City"	David Bowie	3:40
10.	"Who Killed Rock N Roll"		3:16

== Personnel ==
Adapted from AllMusic.

- Peter Adams – keyboards
- Sian Bell – cello
- Winston Blissett – bass
- Boy George – primary artist, vocals
- Alan Branch – engineer
- Cheeky Paul – editing
- Chris Davis – saxophone
- Snake Davis – saxophone
- Linda Duggan – background vocals
- Wilhelm Finger – sleeve art
- Kevan Frost – background vocals
- Eve Gallagher – vocals
- Mitt Gammon – harmonica
- Simon Gardner – flugelhorn, trumpet
- Haxwood Herbert – bagpipes
- Sally Herbert – violin
- Alan Jenkins – engineer
- Julian Mendelsohn – mixing
- Mary Pearse – background vocals
- Jocelyn Pook – viola
- André Scillag – original photography, photography
- Jonathan Shorten – keyboards
- J. Neil Sidwell – trombone
- Richard Sidwell – flugelhorn, trumpet
- Sonia Slany – violin
- Richie Stevens – drums
- John Themis – guitar, mixing, producer, background vocals
- Salvatore Vada – illustrations
- Zee – background vocals
