= Ordinary Alien =

Studio album by Boy George
- Released: 2010
- Recorded: 2001–2009
- Genre: House; dance-pop
- Length: 60:20
- Label: Decode Records
- Producer: Boy George; Kinky Roland

Boy George chronology
U Can Never B2 Straight (2002)	Ordinary Alien (2010)	This Is What I Do (2013)

Singles from Ordinary Alien
- 1. "Amazing Grace" Released: January 25, 2011; 2. "Turn 2 Dust" Released: 2011

Professional ratings
Review scores
Source	Rating
AllMusic	3.5/5 stars

Ordinary Alien – The Kinky Roland Files is an album by Boy George, featuring a collection of his dance recordings made between 2001 and 2009. It was produced by Boy George himself and German record producer Kinky Roland.

== Background ==
Some of the album's tracks, such as "Don't Wanna See Myself", "Look Pon U", and "Kill the A&R", had been shared by George via YouTube and MySpace around 2006–2007. "After Dark" and "Human Racing" (the latter in an alternate version) were featured on George's alter ego The Twin's 2004 album Yum Yum. "If I Were You" was included in his band Culture Club's 2002 box set. "Yes We Can" and "Amazing Grace" were released as singles in 2008 and 2009 respectively. "Turn 2 Dust" was released in dance and also reggae versions at the end of 2011.

The album contains two cover versions: Fleetwood Mac's "Go Your Own Way" and soul-folk songwriter Terry Callier's "I Don't Want to See Myself (Without You)".

== Track listing ==
=== Standard version ===
No.	Title	Writer(s)	Length
1.	"Turn 2 Dust"	George O'Dowd; Kevan Frost	5:46
2.	"Yes We Can"	O'Dowd; John Themis	6:47
3.	"Brand New"	O'Dowd; Frost; Kinky Roland	5:34
4.	"Amazing Grace" (featuring fado singer Ana Laíns)	O'Dowd; Themis; Kinky Roland	5:21
5.	"Don't Wanna See Myself"	Eric Hocheert; Terry Callier; Larry Wade; Pennington McGee	5:48
6.	"If I Were You"	O'Dowd; Themis	5:46
7.	"Go Your Own Way"	Lindsey Buckingham	5:46
8.	"Here Come the Girls" (featuring Ave D)	O'Dowd; Kinky Roland	5:47
9.	"Seconds" (featuring Phiiilip Something)	Phiiilip Something	6:26
10.	"After Dark"	O'Dowd; Frost	6:18
11.	"Kill the A&R"	O'Dowd; Kinky Roland; Cheska Grover	5:10
12.	""Human Racing"	O'Dowd; Frost	5:59
13.	"Look Pon U"	O'Dowd; Kinky Roland	4:17

=== Taiwan 2 CD edition ===
CD 2:

1. "Out of Fashion"
2. "Sanitized"
3. "Time Machine"
4. "Psychology of the Dreamer"
5. "Ragga Music"

=== Argentina 2 CD edition ===
CD 1:

1. "Turn 2 Dust"
2. "Yes We Can"
3. "Brand New"
4. "Amazing Grace"
5. "Don't Wanna See Myself"
6. "If I Were You"
7. "Go Your Own Way"
8. "Time Machine"
9. "Seconds" (featuring Phiiilip Something)
10. "Psychology of the Dreamer"
11. "After Dark"
12. "Human Racing"

CD 2:

1. "Amazing Grace" (Original mix)
2. "Here Come the Girls" (feat. Ave D)
3. "Sanitized"
4. "Kill the A&R"
5. "Look Pon U"
