= Take It Like a Man (autobiography) =

1995 autobiography by Boy George and Spencer Bright

- First edition
- Author: Boy George and Spencer Bright
- Genre: Autobiography
- Publisher: Sidgwick & Jackson
- Publication date: 1995
- Pages: 512
- ISBN: 978-0-0609-2761-5

Take It Like a Man is an autobiography written by English singer and songwriter Boy George. The book was published in 1995 around the same time as George's solo album Cheapness and Beauty.
