= This Is What I Do (Boy George album) =

Studio album by Boy George
- Released: 28 October 2013
- Recorded: 2013
- Genre: Indie pop, alternative, reggae
- Label: Very Me Records, Cometmarket, Kobalt Label Services, Sony Music (South Africa/Latin America/ Australasia/Japan)
- Producer: Richie Stevens

Boy George chronology
Ordinary Alien (2010)	This Is What I Do (2013)	Life (2018)

Professional ratings
Aggregate scores
Source	Rating
Metacritic	67/100
Review scores
Source	Rating
AllMusic	3/5 stars

This Is What I Do is a 2013 album by Boy George, produced by Richie Stevens. With this release, it was the first time since the mid-1990s that a sober George had taken the time to complete a full-length album. It gained positive reviews, with The Guardian calling it "the best comeback of the year". It was Boy George's first solo album to reach the UK Top 40 since his 1987 debut Sold.

Three songs, with videos, were selected as promotional tracks for the album; "King of Everything", "My God" and "Nice and Slow".

To promote the album, George undertook a UK tour in November 2013 featuring support from self-styled "Flock Rock" band The Featherz, whose lead singer/guitarist Danie Cox appeared in the videos for "King of Everything", "My God" and non-album single "I'm Coming Home". A further tour took place in April 2014. George said in an interview in October 2013 that the music of the 70s, when he was discovering music for the first time, left a huge imprint on his soul and that this album is quite 70s in attitude and sound.

A dub version of the album, called "This Is What I Dub Volume 1", was first shared on SoundCloud in 2015. It appeared as a limited cd in 2020, on BGP (Boy George Presents records) and on the major streaming services. It features many collaborators, like Sinead O'Connor and George Clinton.

== Track listing ==
1. "King of Everything" (4:21)
2. "Bigger Than War" (3:45)
3. "Live Your Life" (4:33)
4. "My God" (4:11)
5. "It's Easy" (3:35)
6. "Death of Samantha" (composed by Yoko Ono) (5:28)
7. "Any Road" (4:54)
8. "My Star" (4:20)
9. "Love and Danger" (3:28)
10. "Nice and Slow" (4:08)
11. "Play Me" (6:28)
12. "Feel the Vibration" (5:13)

Canada, Japan and US bonus tracks (Released in March 2014)

1. "Turn On a Little Light for Me"
2. "Make You Feel My Love"
3. "Video Games"

This Is What I Dub Volume 1 (produced by Richie Stevens and Boy George)

1. "Bigger Than War (George Clinton Edit)" (feat. JC-001)
2. "Vanity Project" (feat. General Waste)
3. "Things Are Gonna Change" (feat. Dr. Brian Kennedy)
4. "Star Dub" (feat. Linton Kwesi Johnson)
5. "Nice N Dub" (feat. U Brown)
6. "Dub Your Life" (feat. U Brown & Joe Worriker)
7. "Original Sin" (feat. Sinead Egan)
8. "Vibration Dance Dub"
9. "Meditation Dub"
10. "Dub N Danger" (feat. Mary Pearce)
11. "Play Me Dub" (feat. Dennis Bovell)
12. "God Is Dub"
13. "Death of Samantha" (feat. Sinead O'Connor)

== Charts ==
Chart (2014)	Peak position
Austrian Albums (Ö3 Austria)	61
Belgian Albums (Ultratop Flanders)	120
Belgian Albums (Ultratop Wallonia)	71
Danish Albums (Hitlisten)	37
French Albums (SNEP)	58
German Albums (Offizielle Top 100)	56
Scottish Albums (OCC)	49
UK Albums (OCC)	33
UK Album Downloads (OCC)	41
UK Independent Albums (OCC)	5
