= Funtime (Iggy Pop song) =

Song by Iggy Pop

from the album The Idiot
- Released: 1977
- Recorded: 1976–1977
- Genre: Gothic rock
- Length: 2:54
- Label: RCA
- Songwriters: Iggy Pop; David Bowie
- Producer: David Bowie

"Funtime" is a song written by Iggy Pop and David Bowie, first released by Iggy Pop on his 1977 album entitled The Idiot. It reflects Iggy and Bowie's growing fascination with the German music scene, and bears marked similarities to "Lila Engel" by krautrock band Neu!. It has since been covered by multiple artists including Blondie, Boy George, Bebe Buell, Peter Murphy, R.E.M. and The Cars.

== Composition ==
Iggy had the idea for the song after hearing the Sex Pistols cover the song "No Fun" by his band The Stooges, lyrically the song's ironic take on fun is similar to the song in question. David Bowie wrote the music as well as plays guitar, synthesizers, piano and sings the main chorus on the track. Most notably one of the riffs he plays is a parody of the main riff of The Rolling Stones' "(I Can't Get No) Satisfaction". The song would also appear to have been inspired by the Sly & The Family Stone song "Fun", which appeared on their third studio album Life (1968).

== Use in media ==
The song was used in the movie The Hunger (1983), along with the song "Bela Lugosi's Dead" by gothic rock band Bauhaus, whose frontman Peter Murphy later covered "Funtime" on his second solo album Love Hysteria (1988). The film also stars co-writer of the song, David Bowie.

== Legacy ==
Following its studio appearance on The Idiot, a live version of "Funtime" was included on Pop's TV Eye Live 1977. Pop also performed the song on the television show Dinah! in 1977 with Bowie accompanying on keyboards and backing vocal.

During the sessions for 1981's Shake It Up, members of The Cars recorded a version of "Funtime" featuring bassist Benjamin Orr on vocals. According to Brett Milano's liner notes for Just What I Needed: The Cars Anthology (1995), Pop was present at the recording session and complimented Orr's vocal impersonation of him, telling the bassist "You sound more like me than me." The song was later stripped of Orr's vocals and re-sung by fashion model Bebe Buell, whom Cars singer Ric Ocasek had befriended. The version with Buell's vocals was included on her 1981 EP Covers Girl; the Cars version was released on the band's compilation album Just What I Needed: The Cars Anthology.

Former Bauhaus singer Peter Murphy included a cover of "Funtime" on his 1988 album Love Hysteria.

In 1989, R.E.M. released their own version as the B-side to the Green track "Get Up". A live version of "Funtime" was also recorded by R.E.M. on November 19, 1992, and included on 1995's Strange Currencies EP.

A fifteen-minute live medley of T. Rex's "Bang a Gong" and "Funtime" was performed in 1980 by American band Blondie and released on the 1997 album Picture This Live, also released as Blondie Live - Philadelphia 1978/Dallas 1980. AllMusic reviewer Stephen Thomas Erlewine described the medley as a highlight of the disc.

English pop singer Boy George released a cover of "Funtime" as the lead track on his 1995 album Cheapness and Beauty; AllMusic reviewer William Ruhlmann described George's cover as "a screaming guitar rock version."

A music video was created for the song and it was released as a single, reaching number 45 on the UK Singles Chart in April 1995 and number 60 in Australia in June 1995.

== Personnel ==
- Iggy Pop: Vocals
- David Bowie: Backing Vocals, Guitar, Synthesizers, Piano
- Phil Palmer: Guitar
- George Murray: Bass Guitar
- Dennis Davis: Drums
