= Alistair Brammer =

British actor (born 1988)

- Born: Alistair Daniel Brammer; 12 November 1988 (age 37)
- Occupations: Actor, Singer
- Spouse: Rachel Forde (m. 2016)
- Children: 2

Alistair Daniel Brammer (born 12 November 1988) is an English actor best known for playing Jean Prouvaire in both the 2010 special Les Misérables: 25th Anniversary Concert and the 2012 musical film Les Misérables. Brammer performed as 'Chris' in the Miss Saigon 25th anniversary performance.

Originally from Exmouth, Devon, Brammer is the youngest of seven children. In 2005, he was one of 35 students from around England chosen to participate in the 20th anniversary celebration of Les Misérables at Queen's Theatre in the West End. In 2008, while a student at Exeter College, he competed in Any Dream Will Do, and made it to the final 20 contestants, although he was not selected to be on the show. However, Any Dream Will Do judge Bill Kenwright asked him to appear in the 2008–2009 UK tour of Joseph and the Amazing Technicolor Dreamcoat, where he played Zebulon and understudied both Benjamin and Joseph.

In 2009, he made his West End debut as Marius in Les Miserables, where he spent 18 months in the role. He said of Les Mis, "I should be sick to death of the show, but I can't get over it. It's my favourite." He also played the role of Jean Prouvaire in the Les Misérables 25th Anniversary Concert at The O2 on 3 October 2010.

He also appeared as Walter and understudied Claude in a European tour of Hair, before he was cast as Jean Prouvaire in the 2012 film Les Misérables. Since that time, he also appeared as Billy in the 2012 revival of Taboo at the Brixton Clubhouse, and until 15 March 2014 was playing Billy and understudying Albert in the West End production of War Horse.

On 21 November 2013, it was announced that he would be starring as Chris in the West End revival of Miss Saigon. Previews began on 3 May 2014. He revived his role as Chris in the Broadway revival of Miss Saigon which began previews on 1 March 2017. He remained with the Broadway revival until its closing on 14 January 2018.

On 5 December 2015, Brammer made his first appearance as Jack Diamond, the receptionist, in Casualty.

In December 2016, Brammer played the role of Oliver in the Finale special of Vicious. Oliver served as main characters Freddie and Stuart's brand new upstairs neighbour following the departure of Oliver's flat's previous occupant Ash (Iwan Rheon), whom Freddie and Stuart were close to.

It was confirmed that from 22 July 2019, Brammer would play the role of Fiyero in the West End production of Wicked. He played the role until 30th January 2022.

It was confirmed that from 13 October 2025, Brammer would play the role of Christian in the West End production of Moulin Rouge!.

== Filmography ==
Year	Title	Role	Notes
2008	Any Dream Will Do	Himself	
2010	Les Misérables in Concert: The 25th Anniversary	Jean Prouvaire / Queen's Theatre Company	
2012	Les Misérables	Jean Prouvaire	
2014	National Theatre Live: War Horse	Billy Narracott	
2015-2016	Casualty	Jack Diamond	18 episodes
2016	Vicious	Oliver	Episode: "The Finale"
2016	Miss Saigon	Chris	
2018	Head Full of Honey	Waiter in Train Restaurant	
2019	A Call to Spy	Leo Marks	
2022	Medieval	Freddy	
2022-23	Dalgliesh	DS Daniel Tarrant	
2024	The Watchers	John	
2025	Malpractice	PC John Penvell	1 episode

=== Theatre credits ===
Year	Title	Role	Location
2005	Les Misérables	Ensemble	Queen's Theatre
2008-09	Joseph and the Amazing Technicolor Dreamcoat	Zebulon / Understudy Joseph	UK Tour
2009-10	Les Misérables	Marius Pontmercy	Queen's Theatre
2010	Les Misérables	Jean Prouvaire	O2 Arena
2011	Hair	Walter / Understudy Claude	European Tour
2012	Taboo	Billy	Brixton Clubhouse
2013-14	War Horse	Billy Narracott	Gillian Lynne Theatre
2014-16	Miss Saigon	Chris Scott	Prince Edward Theatre
2016	Les Misérables	Enjolras	Dubai Opera
2017-18	Miss Saigon	Chris Scott	Broadway Theatre
2018	West Side Story	Action	Royal Albert Hall
2019-22	Wicked	Fiyero Tigelaar	Apollo Victoria Theatre
2025-26	Moulin Rouge!	Christian	Piccadilly Theatre
