= House of Truth (Washington, D.C.) =

Political establishment in Washington, D.C.

The House of Truth was an early 20th century establishment in Washington, D.C. associated with American liberal opposition to Republican leadership. The house still stands at 1727 19th Street NW, and from 1911 to 1920 served as a group house including famous residents such as Felix Frankfurter and Walter Lippmann. It was also frequented by Supreme Court Justice Oliver Wendell Holmes Jr.
