= Love Is Leaving =

Single by Boy George
- B-side: "Remix"
- Released: 1996
- Genre: House; trance
- Length: 3:53
- Label: Sony Music
- Songwriters: Boy George; Mike Koglin
- Producer: Mike Koglin

Boy George singles chronology
"Sad" / "Satan's Butterfly Ball" (1996)	"Love Is Leaving" (1996)	"When Will You Learn" (1998)

Music video
- "Love Is Leaving" on YouTube

"Love Is Leaving" is a song by English singer Boy George. It was written by George and German DJ Mike Koglin, who also produced this track, and released in 1996 as a single only. Becoming a sizeable club hit in Europe, the song peaked at number three in Italy and number 61 on the Eurochart Hot 100 in December 1996. Outside Europe, it was successful in Israel, peaking at number-one in March 1997. The single also charted in Australia, reaching number 70. The accompanying black-and-white music video was directed by Ben Unwin. Larry Flick from Billboard magazine complimented the song as an "anthem", while another Billboard editor, Paul Verna, complimented it as a "gem".

== Track listing ==
- 12", Italy (1996)
1. "Love Is Leaving" (Alex Natale Remix) – 5:12
2. "Love Is Leaving" (Alex Natale Dub Mix) – 6:55
3. "Love Is Leaving" (Molella Guitar Mix) – 5:24
4. "Love Is Leaving" (Molly Nrg Mix) – 6:44
- 12" maxi, Spain (1997)
1. "Love Is Leaving" (The Back Teeth Dub) – 8:28
2. "Love Is Leaving" (The Bleeding Gums Dub) – 6:25
3. "Love Is Leaving" (The Back Teeth Edit) – 4:18
- CD single, Belgium (1997)
1. "Love Is Leaving" (The Milk Teeth Popular Mix) – 3:53
2. "Love Is Leaving" (The Incisor Cut/F. Edit) – 3:25
- CD maxi, Europe (1997)
1. "Love Is Leaving" (The Milk Teeth Popular Mix) – 3:53
2. "Love Is Leaving" (The Original Tooth Fairy) – 3:49
3. "Love Is Leaving" (The Bleeding Gums Dub) – 6:25
4. "Love Is Leaving" (The Back Teeth Dub) – 8:28
5. "Love Is Leaving" (The Incisor Cut) – 5:11
6. "Love Is Leaving" (The Back Teeth Edit) – 4:18

== Charts ==
Chart (1996–1997)	Peak position
Australia (ARIA)	70
Europe (Eurochart Hot 100)	61
Israel (Israeli Singles Chart)	1
Italy (Musica e dischi)	3
