= Cheapness and Beauty =

Studio album by Boy George
- Released: 1995
- Recorded: 1993–95
- Studios: Sarm Hook End, Oxfordshire
- Genre: Rock
- Length: 50:20
- Label: Virgin
- Producers: Jessica Corcoran; John Themis

Boy George chronology
| The Martyr Mantras (1990) | Cheapness and Beauty (1995) | The Unrecoupable One Man Bandit (1999) |

Professional ratings
Review scores
| Source | Rating |
|---|---|
| AllMusic | 3/5 stars |
| Entertainment Weekly | A− |
| NME | 6/10 |
| Spin | 5/10 |
| Vibe | (favorable) |
| The Village Voice | (choice cut) |

Cheapness and Beauty is the fifth studio album by English singer and songwriter Boy George, released in 1995. It peaked at number 44 on the UK Albums Chart.

== Background ==
Having scored his biggest solo success in the US and Canada with the theme song for the movie The Crying Game in 1992, George decided to move away from an electronic sound and record some rock-oriented tracks with a glam rock edge. One of the reasons he cited for this move was revisiting his teenage years while writing his autobiography, Take It Like a Man, which was released around the same time as the album. The album also marked the first time in which George did not hide his gay sexuality in the lyrics. The tracks "Genocide Peroxide" and "Il Adore" were both later featured in the musical Taboo.

== Singles ==
The album opens with a cover version of Iggy Pop's "Funtime", which was released as a single and reached number 45 in the UK Singles Chart. Another single was the ballad "Il Adore" which peaked at number 50, and "Same Thing in Reverse", which reached number 56 in the UK and number 18 on the US Billboard Dance Charts.

== Track listing ==
All tracks composed by George O'Dowd (Boy George) and John Themis, except where noted.

1. "Funtime" – 3:05 (Iggy Pop, David Bowie)
2. "Satan's Butterfly Ball" – 3:03
3. "Sad" – 3:52
4. "God Don't Hold a Grudge" – 2:49
5. "Genocide Peroxide" – 3:44
6. "If I Could Fly" – 4:04
7. "Same Thing in Reverse" – 3:33
8. "Cheapness and Beauty" – 3:59
9. "Evil Is So Civilised" – 3:32
10. "Blindman" – 4:12
11. "Your Love Is What I Am" – 4:42
12. "Unfinished Business" – 3:33
13. "Il Adore" – 6:12

== Personnel ==
- Boy George – lead vocals
- John Themis – guitar, vocals and musical director
- Winston Blisset – bass guitar
- Tansay Ibrahim – drums
- Mike Timothy – keyboards
- Lady Zee, Linda Duggan, Stefan Frank – other vocals
- Luís Jardim – ethnic percussion on track 11
- Hossam Ramzy – mandolin
- Martin Bell – extra drums
- Uli Webber – cover picture
- Jessica Corcoran – production
- John Themis – production on tracks 5, 6 and 13

== Charts ==
| Chart (1995) | Peak position |
|---|---|
| Australian Albums (ARIA) | 115 |
| UK Albums (Official Charts) | 44 |
