= We Will Dance Again (song) =

2026 song by Boy George

Single by Boy George
- Language: English; Hebrew
- Released: 26 July 2026
- Genre: Reggae
- Length: 3:18

Boy George singles chronology
"Superstar" (2026)	"We Will Dance Again" (2026)

Official audio
- "We Will Dance Again" on Instagram

"We Will Dance Again" (Hebrew: עוד נרקוד, romanized: Od Nirkod) is a song by Boy George self-released on his Instagram and X profiles on 26 July 2026. In response to the song's reception, Boy George withdrew from the role of King Herod in a production of Jesus Christ Superstar taking place in the same year.

== Background ==
The phrase "We Will Dance Again" has been used to voice support for victims of the October 7 attacks and their loved ones. It was used as the title for a 2024 documentary film about the attacks.

Prior to the song's release, Boy George performed alongside Senhit with the song "Superstar" for San Marino in the Eurovision Song Contest 2026, which had been boycotted by multiple countries due to Israel's participation. He had previously spoken at a demonstration in London against antisemitism.

== Composition and writing ==
"We Will Dance Again" is a macaronic reggae song containing lyrics in English and Hebrew, along with an alternate title in Hebrew, "עוד נרקוד" ("Od Nirkod"). Boy George stated that he utilised generative AI to assist with writing the song and that he "would struggle to write [it] with a human". The song's lyrics defend Israel's military actions in Palestine and deny that a genocide is being carried out in Gaza, and criticise the pro-Palestinian movement, including musicians who have criticised Israel.

== Release ==
The song was released on 26 July 2026 exclusively on Boy George's profiles on Instagram and X, accompanied with the message "Shalom", and was not published on music streaming services. It was later added to Bandcamp before being deleted along with Boy George's profile on the service. He later stated that he had severed his working partnership with the head of his record label BGP (Boy George Presents), calling his rejection of the song "gutless". The song was later reissued by the Alternative Distribution Alliance.

== Reception ==
The song was praised by Neil McCormick in The Daily Telegraph, who described the song as "blunt [and] provocative".

"We Will Dance Again" was criticised for denying the genocide in Gaza committed by Israel. Martyn Ware, musician and founder of the Human League and Heaven 17, described the song as "an overtly pro-genocide, anti-Palestinian piece of musical propaganda". Tommy Sheridan, a former member of the Scottish Parliament, described George as "shameful", "shameless" and "a disgrace".

The negative publicity led to Boy George withdrawing from his role as King Herod in the 2026 revival of Jesus Christ Superstar at the London Palladium, in which he was due to appear in selected August performances, with Richard Armitage taking his place. Boy George defended the song, saying that the idea that he "feel[s] no compassion for Palestinians is both untrue and absurd" and accusing the mass media of "giv[ing] a free pass" to people "deny[ing] the suffering of Israelis".

== Charts ==
Chart performance for "We Will Dance Again"
Chart (2026)	Peak position
Israel International Airplay (Media Forest)	7
