= Sold (Boy George album) =

Studio album by Boy George
- Released: 15 June 1987
- Recorded: 1986
- Studios: AIR, Montserrat; RAK, London
- Genre: Dance-pop
- Length: 43:50
- Label: Virgin
- Producers: Stewart Levine; Glen Skinner

Boy George chronology
Sold (1987)	Tense Nervous Headache (1988)

Singles from Sold
- 1. "Everything I Own" Released: 23 February 1987; 2. "Keep Me in Mind" Released: 26 May 1987; 3. "Sold" Released: July 1987; 4. "To Be Reborn" Released: November 1987

Professional ratings
Review scores
Source	Rating
AllMusic	4/5 stars

Sold is the debut solo studio album by English singer Boy George, released in 1987 by Virgin Records. The album includes George's cover of "Everything I Own", which reached number one in the United Kingdom, Ireland, and Norway, and the top 10 in several other countries.

== Background ==
Sold was released following the breakup of George's band Culture Club in 1986 and his subsequent recovery from drug addiction.

== Commercial performance ==
The album was successful in Europe, but failed to sell as well in the United States, reaching only No. 145 on the Billboard 200. The album got good reviews.

== Singles ==
Following on from the success of "Everything I Own", three further singles were released from the album: "Keep Me in Mind" (UK No. 29), the title track "Sold" (UK No. 24) and "To Be Reborn" (UK No. 13).

== Track listing ==
No.	Title	Writer(s)	Length
1.	"Sold"	George O'Dowd; Vic Martin; Lamont Dozier	3:55
2.	"I Asked for Love"	O'Dowd; Dozier	4:43
3.	"Keep Me in Mind"	O'Dowd; Glenn Nightingale; Jocelyn Brown	4:05
4.	"Everything I Own"	David Gates	3:53
5.	"Freedom"	O'Dowd; Martin; Richie Stevens	3:49
6.	"Just Ain't Enough"	O'Dowd; Dozier	4:18
7.	"Where Are You Now (When I Need You)"	O'Dowd; Glenn Skinner; Stevens; Martin; Nightingale; Ian Maidman; Paul "Wix" Wickens	4:17
8.	"Little Ghost"	Kevin Mooney; Marco Pirroni	3:14
9.	"Next Time"	David Lasley	3:28
10.	"We've Got the Right"	O'Dowd; Martin; Stevens	3:47
11.	"To Be Reborn"	O'Dowd; Dozier	4:26

== Singles ==
- "Everything I Own"/"Use Me"
- "Keep Me in Mind"/"State of Love" (+ "I Pray '87" on the 12" maxi single)
- "Sold"/“Are You Too Afraid?”
- "To Be Reborn"/"Where Are You Now (When I Need You?)"

=== B-sides ===
- "Use Me" – (O'Dowd, Martin, Stevens)
- "State of Love" (Edit & Extended Mix) – (O'Dowd, Roy Hay, Phil Pickett)
- "I Pray '87" – (O'Dowd, Hay, Jon Moss, Mikey Craig, Pickett)
- "Are You Too Afraid" – (Hay, O'Dowd)

== Other songs ==
- "Let It Be" (with Ferry Aid) (Lennon/McCartney) – 6:08
- "The Wishing Well" (with GOSH!) (Chris Copping) – 5:30
- "Live My Life" (from the Hiding Out soundtrack)

== Personnel ==
=== Musicians ===
- Boy George – lead male vocals
- Helen Terry – female vocals
- Richie Stevens – drums, percussion
- Vic Martin – keyboards
- Glenn Nightingale – guitars and background vocals
- Ian Maidman – bass
- Paul "Wix" Wickens – keyboards and rhythm arrangement on tracks 2, 6 & 11
- Michael Timothy – keyboards
- Juliet Roberts – backing vocals
- Carroll Thompson – backing vocals
- Captain Crucial (Amos Pizzey) – toastin'
- Lorenzo Hall – backing vocals
- Jerry Hey – arranging strings and horns

=== Production ===
- Stewart Levine – production
- Glenn Skinner – sound engineer; production on track 10
- Steve Reece – assistant sound engineer
- Malcolm Garrett per Assorted iMaGes – sleeve
- Paul Gobel, Johnny Rozsa, Bill Ling – photography

== Charts and certifications ==
=== Weekly charts ===
Chart (1987)	Peak position
Dutch Albums Chart	51
Italian Albums Chart	4
Norwegian Albums Chart	15
Swedish Albums Chart	18
Swiss Albums Chart	15
UK Albums Chart	29
US Billboard 200	145

=== Certifications ===
Region	Certification	Certified units/sales
United Kingdom (BPI)	Silver	60,000^{^}
^{^} Shipments figures based on certification alone.

== Release history ==
Country	Year	Label	Format	Catalogue
United Kingdom	1987	Virgin Records	CD	CDV 2430
United Kingdom	1987	Virgin Records	MC	MCV 2430
United Kingdom	1987	Virgin Records	LP	V 2430
