= Boy George =

British musician (born 1961)

- Boy George in 2026
- Born: George Alan O'Dowd; 14 June 1961 (age 65); Barnehurst, Kent, England
- Other name: Angela Dust
- Occupations: Musician; singer; songwriter; DJ; mixed media artist
- Years active: 1980–present
- Musical career
- Genres: Pop; new wave; blue-eyed soul
- Instruments: Vocals; turntables
- Works: Boy George discography
- Labels: Virgin; Epic; EMI; Sire; More Protein; Plan A; Very Me; Kobalt; BMG
- Member of: Culture Club
- Formerly of: Jesus Loves You; Bow Wow Wow; Band Aid
- Website: boygeorgeandcultureclub.net

George Alan O'Dowd (born 14 June 1961), known professionally as Boy George, is a British musician, songwriter and DJ who rose to fame as the lead singer of the pop band Culture Club. He is also a solo artist and was the lead singer of the band Jesus Loves You. Boy George's music spans several genres, including pop, new wave, soul, soft rock, disco and reggae.

Boy George grew up in Eltham, south-east London, and was part of the New Romantic movement which emerged in the late 1970s to early 1980s. His androgynous look and style of fashion was greatly inspired by the glam rock pioneers Marc Bolan and David Bowie. He briefly performed shows with the group Bow Wow Wow under the name Lieutenant Lush. After that tenure ended, he formed Culture Club with Roy Hay, Mikey Craig, and later Jon Moss. The band's first album, Kissing To Be Clever (1982), was a hit, with sales of approximately five million copies worldwide. The band's second album, Colour by Numbers (1983), has sold more than 10 million copies worldwide. The group's hit singles included "Do You Really Want to Hurt Me", "Time (Clock of the Heart)", "Church of the Poison Mind", "Karma Chameleon" and "The War Song".

Boy George was the lead singer of Jesus Loves You between 1989 and 1992, which produced the hits "Bow Down Mister" and "Generations of Love". He began his career as a DJ in the mid-1990s. Boy George commenced a solo career in 1987 and has 11 solo studio albums, five compilation albums and forty-eight singles. He has also released seven DJ albums, three EPs, and a soundtrack album. His solo hit songs include "Everything I Own", "Love Is Leaving" and "The Crying Game", from the soundtrack for the film The Crying Game. George has continued to perform with Culture Club, who have re-formed twice since initially parting ways in 1986. Outside of music, Boy George's other creative activities involve mixed media art, writing books, designing clothes and photography. He has also made several appearances in television, which include a fourth-season episode of The A-Team, the 22nd UK series of I'm a Celebrity...Get Me Out of Here! in November 2022, eventually finishing in eighth place. He was featured on the song "Superstar" by Senhit, which represented San Marino in the Eurovision Song Contest 2026 and finished fourteenth in the first semi-final.

Boy George has received several awards as a solo artist and as a member of Culture Club. In 2001, he was voted 46th in a BBC poll of the 100 Greatest Britons. In 2015, Boy George received an Ivor Novello Award from the British Academy of Songwriters, Composers and Authors for Outstanding Services to British Music.

== Early life ==
Boy George was born George Alan O'Dowd at Barnehurst Hospital, Kent, England, on 14 June 1961 and raised in Eltham. He is the second of five children born to builder Jerry O'Dowd (born Jeremiah; 1934–2004) and Dinah O'Dowd (born Christina Glynn; 1939–2023). He was raised in a working-class Irish Catholic family; his father was born in England of Irish descent and his mother was from Dublin. He has one older brother, two younger brothers and a younger sister. He also has an older half-brother, who was born out of wedlock in Dublin in 1957 when his mother was 18; she moved to London with him to start a new life and escape the stigma of being an unmarried mother.

Boy George has compared his family history to a "sad Irish song." His maternal grandmother was permanently taken from her family at age six after being found outside the family home alone, and placed into an industrial school. His great-uncle Thomas Bryan was executed at Mountjoy Prison in 1921 during the Irish War of Independence. According to Boy George's mother, who published a memoir in 2007, Jerry O'Dowd was physically and mentally abusive and beat her, including when she was pregnant with Boy George. Boy George said of his father, "He was a terrible father and a terrible husband." In 1995, Boy George's youngest brother Gerald, who has schizophrenia, was convicted of killing his wife in an episode of paranoia.

Boy George attended Middle Park Infant School and later attended Eltham Green Secondary School. He has said that he found every possible excuse to avoid going to school, and that he was "good at art, not bad at English – and appalling at maths". He added, "I left school with absolutely no qualifications. I missed every exam. Once I'd learned to read and write, I wasn't interested in school any more". Boy George has said that he was dismissed from school at age 15 after he dyed his hair orange. He has worked as a fruit picker, a printer, a makeup artist, and a model.

Boy George was a follower of the New Romantic movement, which was popular in the UK in the early 1980s. He lived in various squats around Warren Street in Central London. He and his friend Marilyn were regulars at Blitz, a London nightclub run by Steve Strange and Rusty Egan. The pop artists that inspired him were Siouxsie and the Banshees, Roxy Music, Patti Smith, and the two major glam rock pioneers, David Bowie and T. Rex frontman Marc Bolan. On the impact of Bolan and Bowie on him, Boy George said:

They represented a kind of bohemian existence that I—at that point—could only imagine living. I loved the music. The first time I ever saw Marc Bolan really, properly was singing "Metal Guru" and just loved him. I don't think you can separate an artist from what they wear or what they sing—it's kind of the complete package. It's something which is very organic and individual.

Fashion and look were "important". He declared: "My original inspiration was Siouxsie Sioux".

== Career ==
=== Culture Club ===
Boy George's androgynous style of dressing caught the attention of music entrepreneur Malcolm McLaren (previously the manager of the Sex Pistols), who arranged for Boy George to perform with the group Bow Wow Wow. Going by the stage name Lieutenant Lush, his tenure with Bow Wow Wow proved problematic with lead singer Annabella Lwin. Boy George left the group and started his own band with bassist Mikey Craig. They were joined by Jon Moss (who had drumming stints with the Damned and Adam and the Ants) and then guitarist Roy Hay. Originally they were named Sex Gang Children, but they later settled on the name Culture Club. The band formed in 1981.

Britain, home of the brave new world of pop, has kept lobbing them over. One need only look at the current charts, which are flecked with such dauntless new-music wunderkinds as Eurythmics and Madness, not to mention the unlikeliest pop scion of them all, by george: Boy George O'Dowd of Culture Club.

— Anglomania: The Second British Invasion, by Parke Puterbaugh for Rolling Stone, November 1983

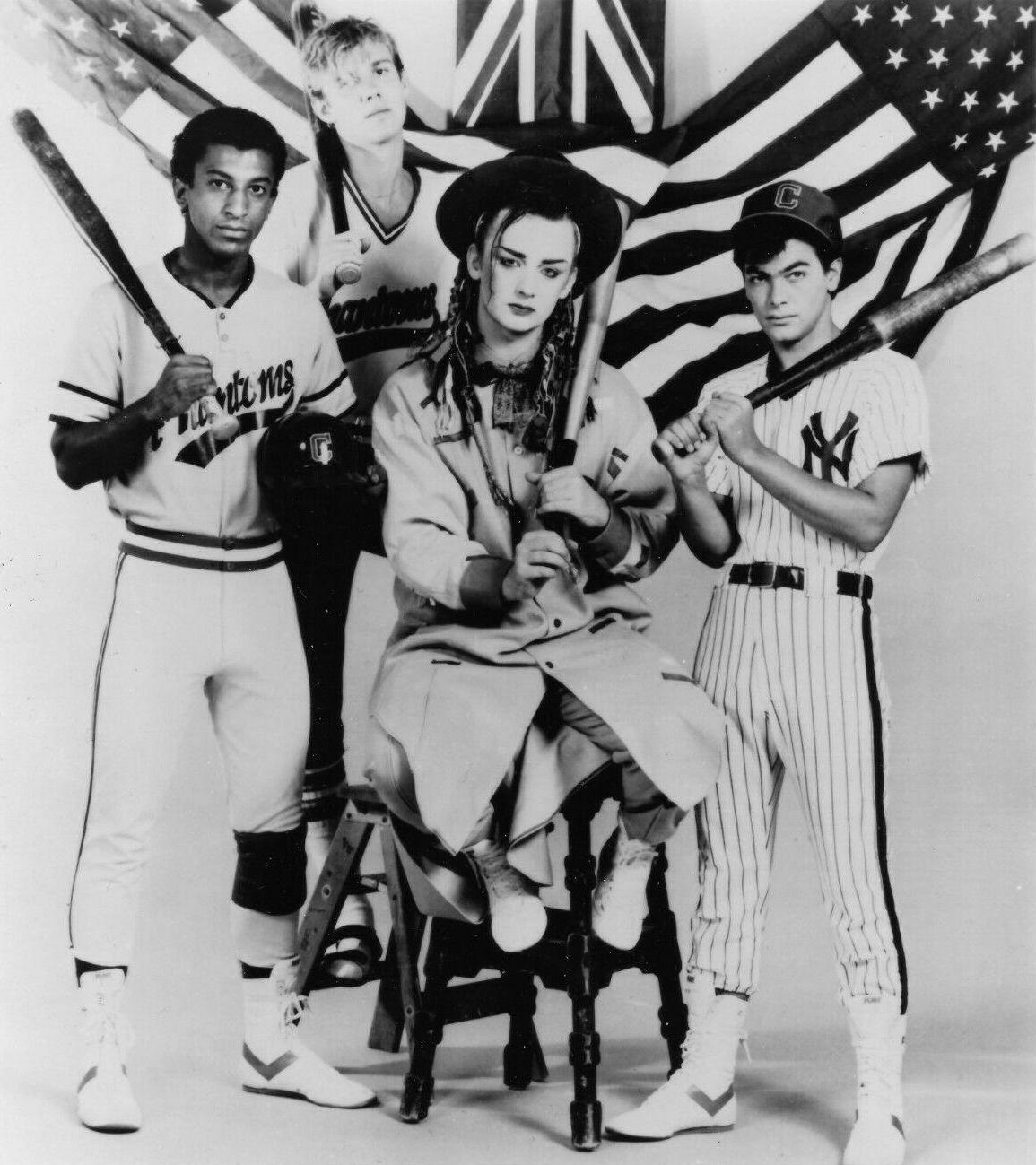
Boy George visual classic with Culture Club.

The band recorded demos that were paid for by EMI Records, but the label declined to sign them. Virgin Records expressed interest in signing the group in the UK for European releases, while Epic Records handled the US and North American distribution. They recorded their debut album, Kissing to Be Clever (UK No. 5, US No. 14), and it was released in 1982. The single "Do You Really Want to Hurt Me" became an international hit, reaching No. 1 in multiple countries around the world, plus top ten in several more countries (US No. 2). This was followed by the Top 5 hit "Time" in the US and UK, and "I'll Tumble 4 Ya" which reached US No. 9. This gave Culture Club the distinction of being the first group since the Beatles to have three Top 10 hits in the US from a debut album.

Their next album, Colour By Numbers, was an enormous success, topping the UK charts and reaching No. 2 in the US. The single "Church of the Poison Mind" became a Top 10 hit, and "Karma Chameleon" was an international hit, peaking at No. 1 in 16 countries, and the top ten in additional countries. In the US it hit No. 1, where it stayed for three weeks. It was the best-selling single of 1983 in the United Kingdom, where it spent six weeks at No. 1. "Victims" and "It's a Miracle" were further Top 5 UK hits, while "Miss Me Blind" reached the Top 5 in the US.

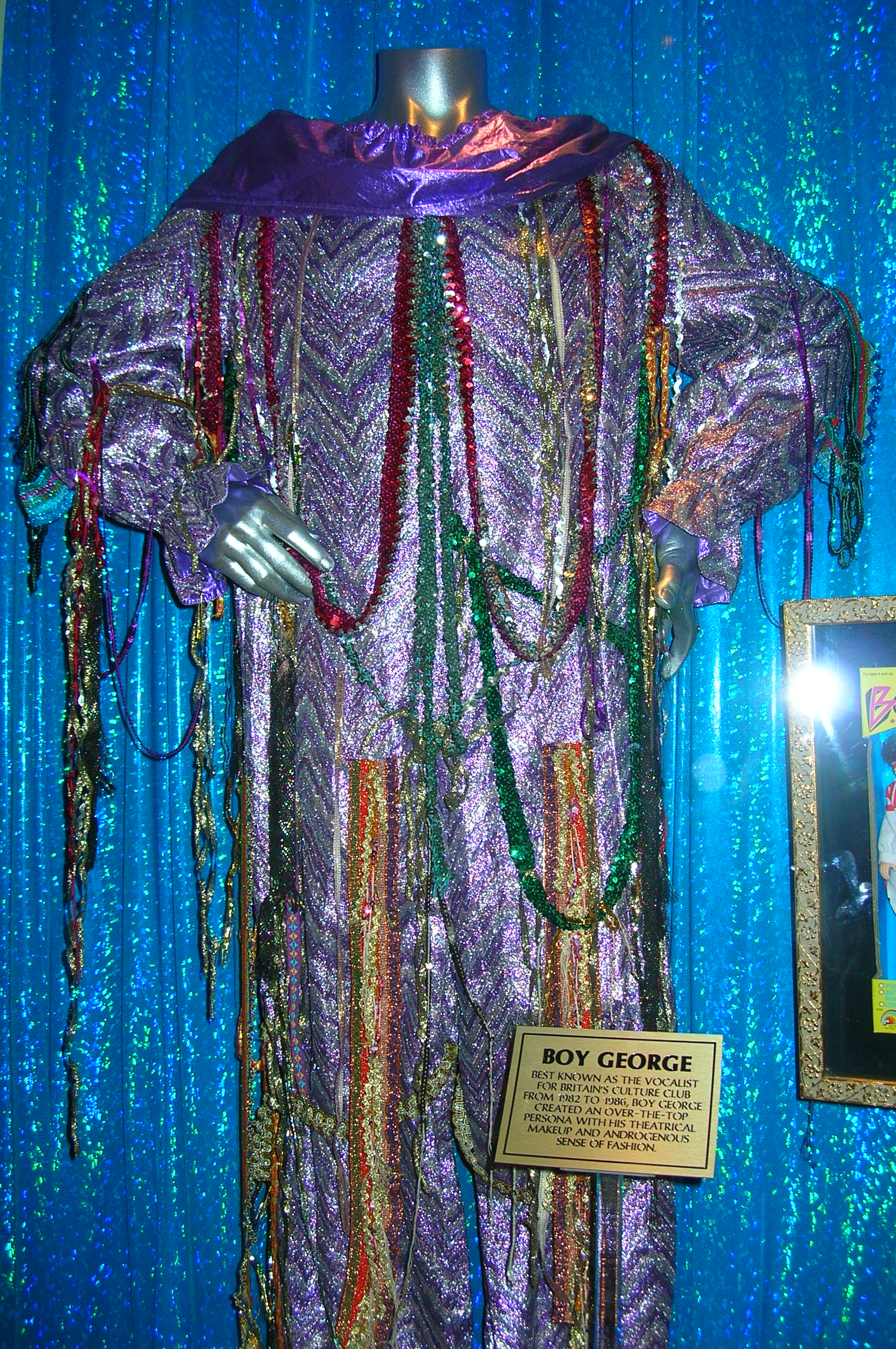
Reflecting his theatrical make-up and androgynous fashion, one of Boy George's outfits on display at the Hard Rock Cafe, Hollywood

The band's third album, Waking Up with the House on Fire (UK No. 2, US No. 26), was not as big a hit as its predecessors internationally, but still achieved chart success. The first single, "The War Song", was a No. 2 hit in the UK, but further singles performed below expectations. On 25 November 1984, Boy George provided a joint lead vocal role on the Band Aid charity single "Do They Know It's Christmas?" recorded at Sarm West Studios in Notting Hill, west London. He was the last solo artist to deliver his lines, at 6 pm, having just arrived in the studio from Heathrow Airport after a Concorde transatlantic flight. The song featured mostly British and Irish musical acts, with Boy George the second singer to feature after Paul Young sings the opening lines. It became Christmas number one and the best-selling single of 1984 in the United Kingdom. Proceeds from the song were donated to feed famine victims in Africa during the 1984–1985 famine in Ethiopia. Unlike many of the bands featured on the single, Culture Club did not perform at Live Aid in July 1985.

In 1986, Boy George performed a guest-starring cameo role in an episode of the television series The A-Team titled "Cowboy George". Also in 1986, Culture Club released their fourth album, From Luxury to Heartache (UK No. 10, US No. 32), which featured the hit single "Move Away".

With Boy George's subsequent drug addiction, the underwhelming performance of their last two albums, a soured romance between band members shrouded in secrecy, and a wrongful death lawsuit looming, the group ultimately disbanded in 1986.

==== Reunions ====
In July 1998, a reunited Culture Club performed three dates in Monte Carlo and then joined the Human League and Howard Jones in a "Big Rewind" tour of the US. The following month, the band appeared on the Late Show with David Letterman and made an appearance in Britain, their first in 14 years. Later that year, the band hit the UK charts at No.4 with "I Just Wanna Be Loved" and later a top 25 hit with "Your Kisses are Charity". A new Culture Club album, Don't Mind If I Do, was released in 1999. In 2006, the band decided to again reunite and tour, but Boy George declined to join them. As a result, two members of Culture Club replaced him with vocalist Sam Butcher. Boy George expressed his displeasure. After only one showcase and one live show, the project was shelved.

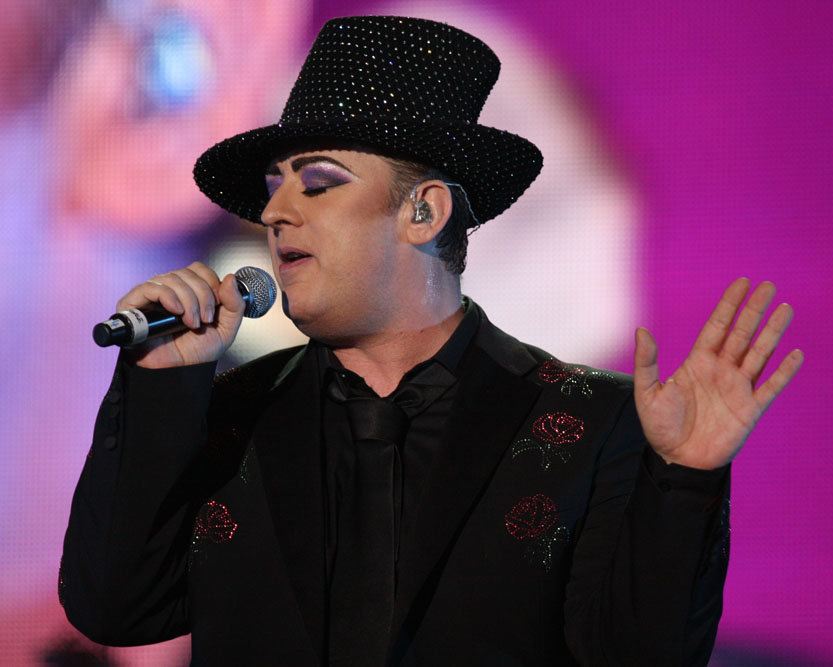
Boy George with Culture Club at the New Year's Eve concert in Sydney, Australia, December 2011

On 27 January 2011, Boy George announced a 30th anniversary Culture Club reunion tour sometime later in the year, and a new album for 2012. Although the 2011 tour never took place, Culture Club did play two live concerts, in Dubai and Sydney, the latter being a New Year's Eve concert. In 2014, the band were back together, publishing a new picture of the four members was also posted, along with a list of 11 concert dates through the UK. Alison Moyet would be a special guest at the concerts. The band were scheduled to perform dates in America in 2014 before the UK tour in December.

The band was scheduled to tour New Zealand in 2016. Tickets were sold for performances in Christchurch and Auckland. In November 2016, in a pre-tour interview on TVNZ, Boy George walked out after the interviewer asked him about his 2009 criminal conviction. The band then cancelled its Christchurch performance, saying it was due to changes in its international touring schedule. Later in November, the December performance in Auckland was also cancelled.

=== Other career endeavours ===
==== Late 1980s ====
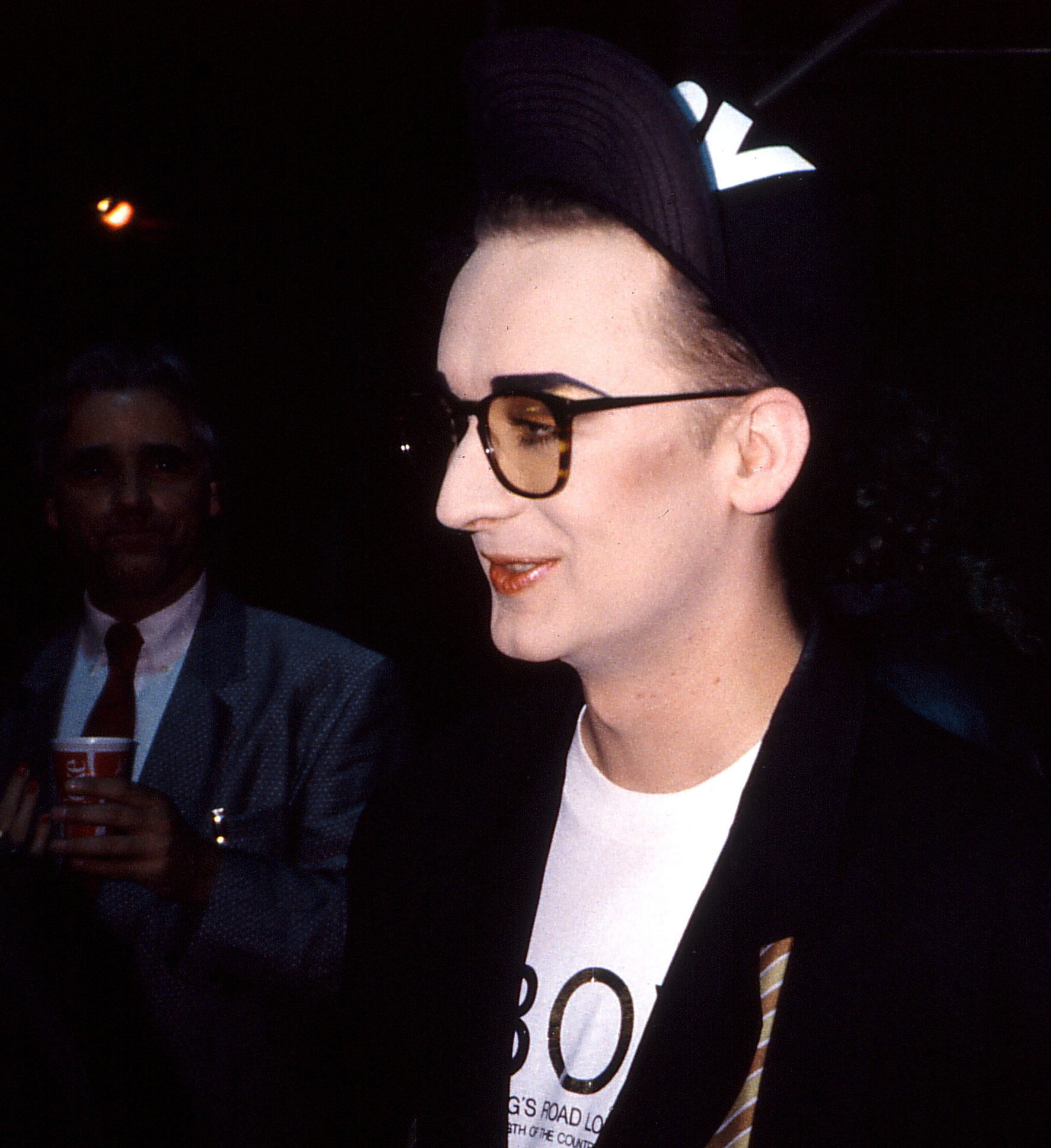
Boy George in 1988

After the dissolution of Culture Club in 1986, Boy George entered treatment and was prescribed narcotics to treat his addiction to heroin. In 1987, Boy George released his first solo album, Sold, which garnered success in Europe. It spawned the UK singles "Everything I Own" (UK No. 1), "Keep Me in Mind" (UK No. 29), "To Be Reborn" (UK No. 13), and the title song, "Sold" (UK No. 24). The singles were also hits in various other European countries. The album's success, however, was not duplicated in America. This may have been due in part to the fact that Boy George was prohibited by US authorities from travelling to the United States for several years because of his British drug charges. He was therefore unable to be in America to help promote the album.

Boy George did score his first solo US Top 40 hit with the single "Live My Life" (US No. 40) from the soundtrack to the film Hiding Out. Tense Nervous Headache (1988) and Boyfriend (1989) would be his next two internationally released albums; however, these two albums would not be distributed in the US. Instead, Virgin Records selected several songs from each of these albums for a North American-only release called High Hat (1989). High Hat scored a US Top 5 R&B hit in "Don't Take My Mind on a Trip", produced by Teddy Riley. Boy George's next single in the UK was "No Clause 28", a protest song against a legal provision (Section 28) introduced by Margaret Thatcher's Conservative government that prohibited the promotion of homosexuality by local authorities such as schools. In accepting the award for Best British Group from Boy George at the 1989 Brit Awards held at the Royal Albert Hall in London, Andy Bell of Erasure kissed Boy George on stage to cheers from the crowd, with Bell stating it was an act in protest against Section 28.

==== 1990s ====
Bow Down Mister (A Small Portion 2 B Polite Mix) excerpt
An excerpt from Bow Down Mister (A Small Portion 2 B Polite Mix)

In 1989, Boy George formed his own record label, More Protein, and began recording under the name Jesus Loves You, writing under the pseudonym Angela Dust, a word play on angel dust. He released several underground hits in the early 1990s: "After the Love", "Generations of Love" and "Bow Down Mister", the last giving him a UK Top 30 hit in 1991. Inspired by his involvement in the Hare Krishna movement (ISKCON), Boy George had written the song during a trip to India. Another single, "One on One", featured a remix by Massive Attack. From March 1990 to April 1991, Boy George presented a weekly chat and music show on the Power Station satellite channel called Blue Radio. In 1992, Boy George had a hit with the Pet Shop Boys-produced song "The Crying Game", from the soundtrack for the film The Crying Game. The song reached number 22 in the UK Singles Chart, and number 15 on the US Billboard Hot 100. Larry Flick from Billboard complimented Boy George's "genius reading" of the song. Dave Sholin from the Gavin Report commented, "It's been said again and again that all any performer needs is the right material to have a hit. Boy George is just the right singer to resurrect this song".

Boy George has also enjoyed a second career as a notable music DJ. His first gig as a DJ was at Phillip Sallon's new nightclub, Planets, located in London's Piccadilly. In the 1990s he came to the attention of rave/house promoters Fantazia who asked him to mix one of the discs on the two volumes in their new compilation series Fantazia The House Collection 2. This compilation was a success in the UK, going gold. The album was also sold to Sony for European-wide release. London nightclub Ministry of Sound hired him to compile one of their first CDs, which sold 100,000 copies. He then completed some compilations for them, four of them being the Annual I to IV. George released the rock-driven album Cheapness and Beauty in 1995. The single "Same Thing in Reverse" became a minor US hit. The Unrecoupable One Man Bandit – Volume One was the next album release, first being sold on the internet only, then distributed by independent labels.

On some other labels, several dance-oriented songs were released in various countries. For example, "Love Is Leaving" went Top 3 in Italy and "When Will You Learn" reached the top position in the Swiss charts. "When Will You Learn" was also nominated for the Best Dance Recording, at the Grammy Awards. In 1999, Boy George collaborated on songs with dance-oriented acts. For example, "Why Go?", a slow-paced track with Faithless, from their Sunday 8PM LP, was later released in a remixed form in some European countries and Australia. A track was done with Groove Armada, named "Innocence is Lost", but was only released on a promo 12" in 1999.

==== 2000s ====
Boy George remained a figure in the public eye, starring in the London musical Taboo, based on the New Romantic scene of early 1980s England (Boy George did not play himself, opting instead to take on the persona of Australian-born performance artist Leigh Bowery). Boy George was nominated for a Tony Award for the "Best Musical Score" and Taboo was highly successful in London's West End, running for two years and receiving four Laurence Olivier Award nominations, though a heavily altered US production produced by Rosie O'Donnell in New York City was short-lived, running for 100 performances.

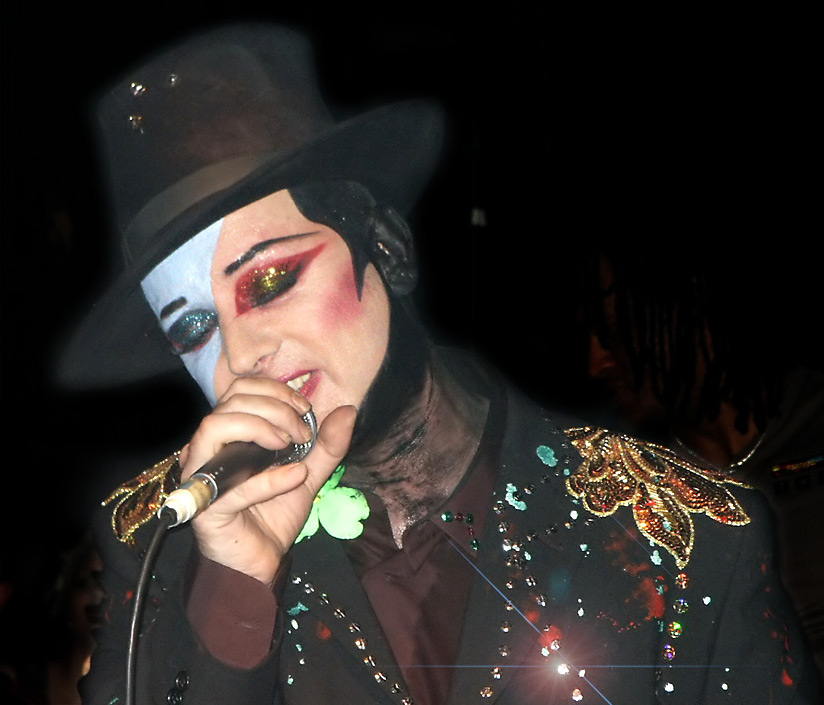
Boy George performing at Ronnie Scott's Jazz Club, London in 2003

In 2002, Boy George released U Can Never B2 Straight, an "unplugged" collection of rare and lesser-known acoustic works. It contained unreleased tracks from previous years as well as some ballads from Cheapness and Beauty and the Culture Club album Don't Mind if I Do. From 2002 to 2004, under the pseudonym "The Twin", Boy George experimented in electronica, releasing limited-edition 7" singles and promo records. The limited releases included four 7" singles, one limited 12" single (for "Sanitised") and a promo CD, a 13-track album Yum Yum. Two years later, it was released via digital outlets such as iTunes. An album recorded in the spring of 2003 was also shelved.

During 2003, Boy George presented a weekly show on London radio station LBC 97.3 for six months. He wrote the foreword for a feng shui book called Practical Feng Shui by Simon G. Brown (published in 1998). He also appeared as a guest on the British comedy-talk show The Kumars at No. 42. In March 2005 he was the guest host for an episode of The Friday Night Project, for Channel 4 television.

In 2005, Boy George released Straight, the second volume of his autobiography. A new album, also named Straight, was announced for mid-2005, but never released; only a four-track sampler was released along with a book titled Straight. A reggaeton-oriented EP was also planned for August 2006 but was never released. Some recent tracks were shared by Boy George himself in late 2006 and early 2007 on his YouTube account, his three Myspace pages and sometimes on his official site. In January 2007, Boy George released "Time Machine" on Plan A Records, a song co-written with Ivor Novello Award-winning songwriter Amanda Ghost, who also co-wrote "You're Beautiful" with James Blunt.

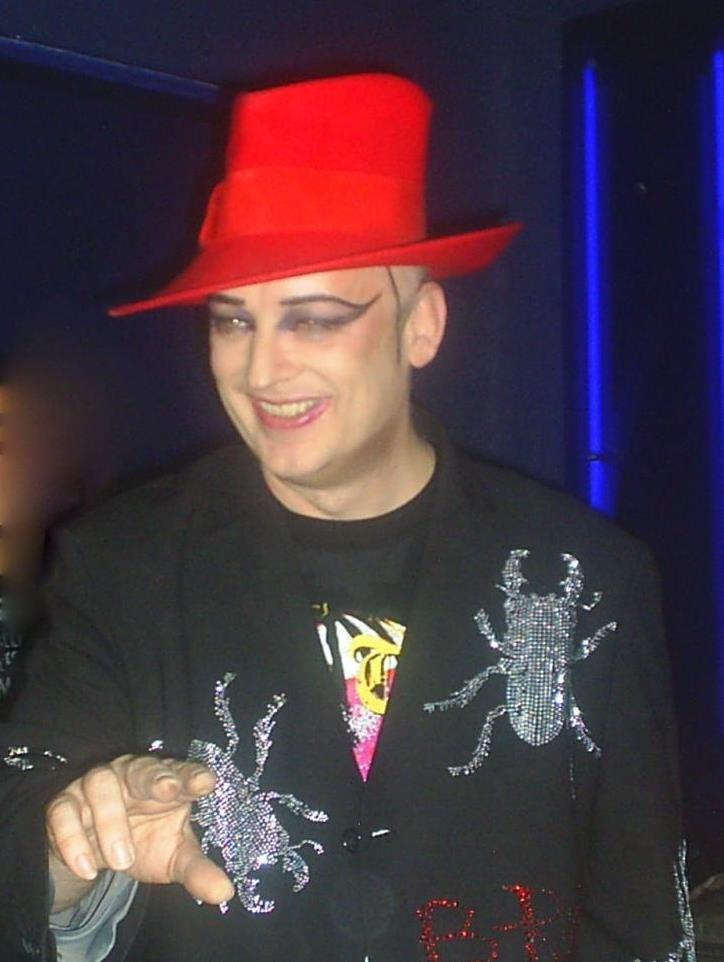
Boy George performing as a DJ in Brazil, 2007

Later in 2007, two electronica/dance collaborations were released in limited editions. On 25 February 2007, Boy George was special guest DJ at LGBT nightspot the Court Hotel in Perth, Australia. On 4 March 2007, he performed as a DJ at the Hordern Pavilion in Sydney for the Mardi Gras Festival. On 11 May 2007, he performed as a DJ at the launch party for the Palazzo Versace in Dubai, UAE. Boy George cancelled his planned 2007 October tour via his website. In 2007, he toured as a DJ, visiting many venues around the world.

Boy George played a special residency at the Shaw Theatre in London from 23 January 2008, followed by a full UK tour. In April 2008, The Biography Channel featured a documentary on the life of Boy George. The American tour which was planned for July/August 2008 had to be cancelled because he had been denied a United States visa due to a pending London court case scheduled for November 2008. On 2 July six concert dates were scheduled for South America. Boy George participated in RETROFEST held in Scotland in August 2008, and a 30-date UK tour took place in October/November 2008. In 2009, he signed a new record deal subsequently releasing the album Ordinary Alien – The Kinky Roland Files in the autumn of 2010. The album consisted of previously recorded tracks mixed by long-time dance-pop record producer Kinky Roland. He took part in Night of the Proms, which is a series of concerts held yearly in Belgium, the Netherlands, Germany and Spain which consist of a combination of pop music and popular classical music (often combined).

==== 2010s ====
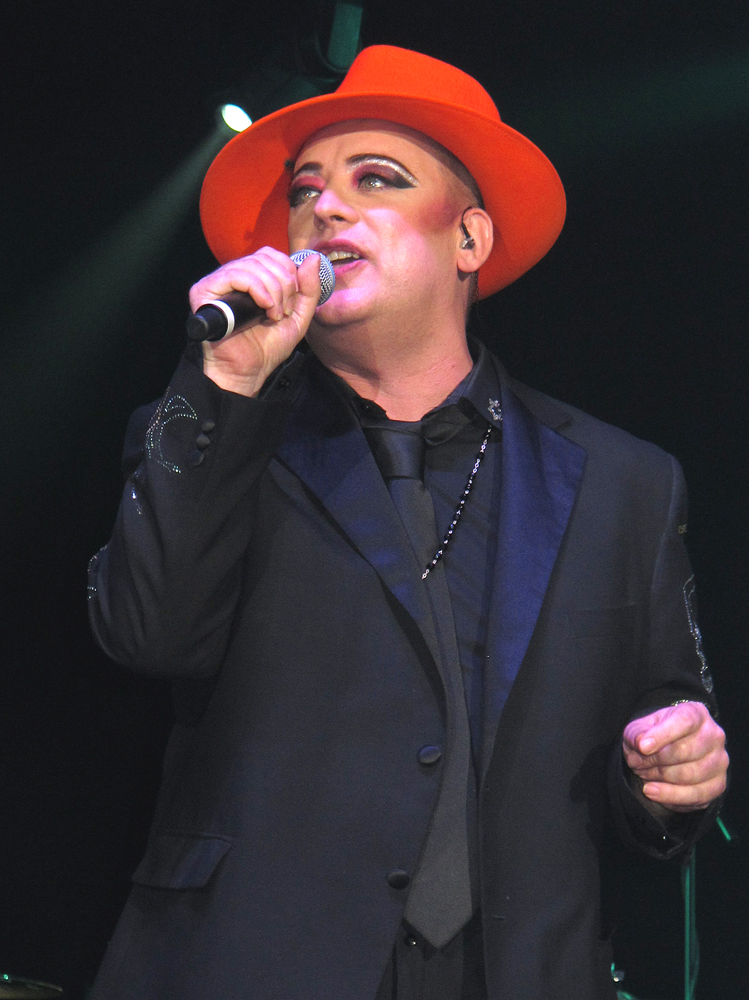
Boy George during the Here and Now Tour in 2011

Boy George's 2012 appearances included the Melbourne International Arts Festival in October, both as featured guest DJ and also performing with Antony Hegarty in the festival's presentations of Swanlights, the Museum of Modern Art's musical artwork commission, which had only been performed one night previously, at Radio City Music Hall in New York City.

In June 2013, a new song was released called "Coming Home". Mikey Craig, former bandmate in Culture Club, co-wrote the song with Boy George. It was written during the song writing sessions for his album This Is What I Do released in October 2013. It has been remixed by the likes of Marc Vedo and Kinky Roland. The artist listed for the song is Dharma Protocol featuring Boy George. A video was released on YouTube shot and directed by Boy George, though he did not appear in the video. It was set on the Epping Ongar Railway and starred Danie Cox, lead singer and guitarist of London-based band the Featherz.

On 28 October 2013, Boy George released This Is What I Do, his first album of original material in 18 years. The album was written by Boy George and long-time writing partners John Themis, Kevan Frost and Richie Stevens. Stevens produced the record at London's Cowshed Studios and it was released by Kobalt Label Services. The album also contained writing collaborations with Youth, and a version of Yoko Ono's "Death of Samantha". It was mixed by Dave Bascombe and features a string of guest musicians including DJ Yoda, Kitty Durham, Ally McErlaine, MC Spee and Nizar Al Issa. In 2015, BBC Four showed Boy George and Culture Club: From Karma to Calamity a film about a 2014 reunion, a new album, and a planned UK–US tour.

In January 2016, Boy George joined the fifth series of The Voice UK, replacing Tom Jones as a mentor. His final act, Cody Frost, finished third place overall. Boy George left the series after just one season and later went on to join The Voice Australia as a coach for its sixth season to replace The Madden Brothers. His final contestant, Hoseah Partsch, was the runner-up. He returned for the show's seventh season, in 2018, its eighth season, in 2019 where his final contestant, Diana Rouvas, won the competition, and its ninth season in 2020. Boy George did not return for the tenth season and was replaced by Jessica Mauboy.

In October 2016, Boy George performed David Bowie's "Starman" — nine months after his idol's death from liver cancer — along with the National Health Service choir, as part of Channel 4's Stand Up to Cancer UK programme. In 2017, Boy George participated in the last season of The New Celebrity Apprentice on NBC, in which he supported the charity Safe Kids Worldwide and came in second place. Also in 2017 he collaborated on Pitbull's album Climate Change. In August 2017, Boy George signed a recording deal with BMG, reuniting him with his songwriting catalogue, as BMG had acquired the Virgin Records songwriters in 2012. In 2019, he joined Marc Almond and Chrissie Hynde as a vocalist on "Don't Go Changing Soho", a single by Jocasta's Tim Arnold for the Save Soho campaign.

On 2 and 26 March 2020, through his YouTube channel, Boy George respectively released (as videos) 2 new solo songs entitled "Clouds" and "Isolation" taken from his forthcoming album Geminis Don't Read the Manual which was due to be released later in the year, but was postponed. On 6 April 2020 on his own record label BGP (Boy George Presents) he released the "Isolation" limited edition 2-track CD single including the title track and a new "Spatial Awareness Meets the Boy Uptown Dub" mix of the track "Clouds".

==== 2020s ====
In 2021, Boy George was a guest on the BBC's Paul Weller – Live at the Barbican, joining Paul Weller and conductor Jules Buckley for a version of the Style Council's "You're the Best Thing". In September 2021, he became a judge on the Irish talent show The Big Deal.

In November 2022, Boy George appeared as a contestant on the 22nd UK series of I'm a Celebrity...Get Me Out of Here!. During his appearance on the show, Boy George expressed discomfort about appearing on the show with former UK health secretary Matt Hancock, mentioning that his mother had been in hospital while the country was under a COVID-19 lockdown. He said that he would have withdrawn from the show had his mother died in hospital.

In a conversation with Seann Walsh, Boy George said that he found Hancock "slimy and slippery" and later told Hancock that he found it difficult to "separate" the politician from the person. He was eliminated from the show on 22 November on the seventeenth day, finishing in 8th place.

From 6 February through 12 May 2024, and again from 18 March through 25 May 2025, Boy George portrayed Harold Zidler on Broadway in the Moulin Rouge! musical at the Al Hirschfeld Theatre.

In 2025, Boy George appeared in Gurinder Chadha’s film Christmas Karma, a musical retelling of A Christmas Carol, as the Ghost of Christmas Future.

In 2024, Boy George was among over 400 artists and public figures who signed an open letter supporting Israel's participation in the Eurovision Song Contest 2024 in Malmö, Sweden. The letter urged the event's organisers to maintain the contest's non-political nature and to allow Israeli singer Eden Golan to perform her song "Hurricane".

Boy George featured on the song "Superstar" by Italian singer Senhit, which represented San Marino in the Eurovision Song Contest 2026 in Vienna, Austria; he performed alongside Senhit at the contest. San Marino were eliminated on 12 May, finishing fourteenth in the first semi-final.

===== 2026: "We Will Dance Again" =====
On 26 July 2026, Boy George released "We Will Dance Again", a song about the October 7 attacks and the following Gaza war. The song title is a phrase (also used as the title of a documentary film) used by Israelis to express hope in the wake of the October 7 music festival attack by Hamas. The song was posted on Instagram and X, and features lyrics in both English and Hebrew, along with a Hebrew-language name, "עוד נרקוד". The opening lyrics are "You say genocide, I say war / When you're attacked, that's what the army's for / Does it get ugly? You bet it does / When I know you wanna kill every last one of us." The song also criticized pro-Palestinian protesters and musicians with the lyrics, "You condemn the Jews, with selective memory / Musicians holding flags, mouthing like sheep / Propaganda fuelled by the internet feels so weak". The song drew criticism from pro-Palestinian advocates for denying the genocide in Gaza, with fellow musician Martyn Ware of the Human League describing it as "an overtly pro-genocide, anti-Palestinian piece of musical propaganda". Boy George later confirmed that the song was created using artificial intelligence, stating on Threads, "The song was created using AI. I call it 'AI for good'. Truthfully, I would struggle to write this with a human!".

Boy George was scheduled to appear as King Herod in the August 2026 revival of Jesus Christ Superstar for a limited engagement at the London Palladium. However, on 30 July, after he experienced backlash over the song, he announced that he was withdrawing from the opera. Boy George also sacked the manager of his record label, BGP, after the manager said, "I want nothing to do with this song".

On 9 September 2026, Boy George performed "We Will Dance Again" in public for the first time at a synagogue in Vancouver, before an audience of about 800 people. The event, held ahead of Rosh Hashanah, ended with Boy George receiving an inscribed shofar and reciting the Shehecheyanu blessing.

On 10 October 2026, Boy George stated that he is facing intimidation and harassment regarding his scheduled performances in Israel. Despite the backlash, he clarified that standing in solidarity with the Israeli people does not imply a lack of concern or empathy for Palestinians or that he endorses all actions of the Israeli government.

On 2 November 2026, Boy George met with President of Israel Isaac Herzog at the President's Residence in Jerusalem, where Herzog thanked the musician for his support of Israel and referenced his song We Will Dance Again. Also in attendance at the meeting were President of World Jewish Congress Israel Sylvan Adams and former hostage Elkana Bohbot. At the meeting, Boy George said, “In some ways, the old Boy George no longer exists, because some people don’t see me in the way they used to, and a lot of other people see me in a new way," and added that, "I feel like ‘We Will Dance Again’ has forced me to grow up. This experience has made me much more aware of what is out there emotionally and what challenges us.”

== Personal life ==
=== Ancestry ===
Boy George appeared on an episode of BBC television genealogy series Who Do You Think You Are? in 2018, on which it was revealed that he was related to executed Irish revolutionary Thomas Bryan, a member of the "Forgotten Ten".

=== Health ===
Concurrently with developing his career as a DJ in the late 1990s, Boy George adopted a macrobiotic diet, which he had been attempting to follow since 1988. In 2001, he published the Karma Cookbook, a macrobiotic cookbook co-written with Dragana Brown, whom Boy George met in 1986.

In 2014, Boy George suffered from a haemorrhaged polyp on his vocal cords, resulting in the cancellation of a Culture Club reunion tour. Several dates in Canada, the UK and the US were cancelled. Following months of resting his voice, spending some days in total silence, giving up coffee, and practicing vocal exercises, Boy George recovered without needing surgery. Afterwards, he was surprised to discover that his vocal range had become an octave lower than before, which he described as a "kind of rich tenor" and suitable for singing "a little bit of rock."

In 2018, Boy George stated that he had been sober since 2 March 2008.

=== Sexuality ===
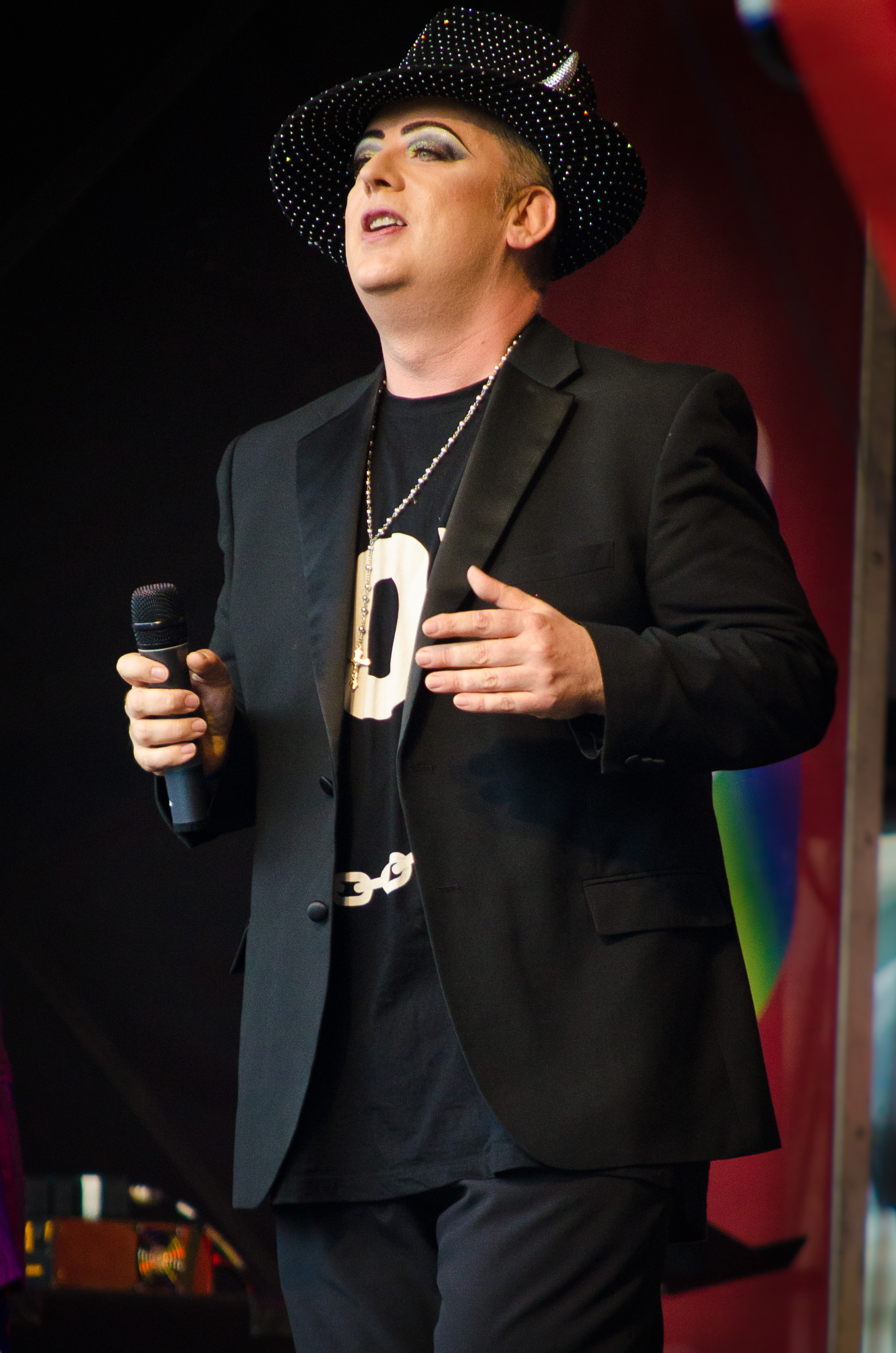
Boy George at the Pride London festival in 2012

In the 1980s, much was made of Boy George's androgynous appearance, and there was speculation about his sexuality. When asked by Joan Rivers in an interview on her show in 1983, "Do you prefer men or women?", Boy George replied, "Oh, both." In 1985, Barbara Walters asked him about his sexual orientation, to which Boy George stated that he was bisexual and had various girlfriends and boyfriends in the past. He gave a famous, oft-quoted response to interviewer Russell Harty that he preferred "a nice cup of tea" to sex.

In his 1995 autobiography Take It Like a Man, Boy George stated that he was, in fact, not bisexual and that he had had secret relationships with punk rock singer Kirk Brandon and Culture Club drummer Jon Moss. He asserted that many of the songs he wrote for Culture Club were about his relationship with Moss. In the 2008 documentary Living with Boy George, he talked about his first realisation he was gay, when he first told his parents, and why men fall in love with one another as well as with women. As two of the biggest androgynous stars in music, Boy George and Annie Lennox appeared on the cover of Smash Hits magazine in December 1983, followed by the cover of Newsweek magazine in January 1984.

=== Spirituality ===
In 2013, Boy George credited his practice of Nichiren Buddhism and chanting Namu Myōhō Renge Kyō for his newfound spiritual strength to remain sober. Boy George has said: "I'm Catholic in my complications and Buddhist in my aspirations."

== Drug abuse and legal issues ==
By the late 1980s, Boy George had been struggling with heroin addiction for several years. He attempted to perform concerts while under its influence. Addictions to other drugs soon followed. Determined to save Boy George's life, his younger brother David made an appearance on UK national television and discussed Boy George's drug habit, which Boy George had been publicly denying at that time. In 1986, Boy George was arrested for heroin possession as part of "Operation Culture".

In 1986, keyboardist Michael Rudetsky, who co-wrote the song "Sexuality" on Culture Club's From Luxury to Heartache album, was found dead of a heroin overdose in Boy George's London home. Boy George's friend Mark Vaultier died after an overdose of methadone and Valium at a party. In December 1986, another friend, Mark Golding, died of an overdose, with Scotland Yard police stating there was no suggestion of foul play. During this period Boy George decided to seek treatment for his addiction.

In 1997, Boy George was sued for malicious falsehood by singer Kirk Brandon. In his 1995 autobiography Take It Like a Man, Boy George stated that he had had a homosexual relationship with Brandon years earlier. Brandon denied that he had had sex with Boy George and stated that stories about their alleged relationship had damaged his career as a musician. He also objected to the lyrics of a Boy George song, "Unfinished Business", which apparently were aimed at him: "I hear you married a Danish girl ... You break your promise easily." Brandon demanded damages from George, George's publishers, Sidgwick and Jackson, and also from Virgin Records and EMI Virgin Music Publishing. In April 1997, the court ruled in favour of George, adding that he did not believe Brandon when Brandon denied having had a physical relationship with George. The judge ordered Brandon to pay £200,000 to Virgin Records, EMI Virgin Music, and the book publisher in court costs. Following the lawsuit, Brandon declared bankruptcy, which resulted in George paying over £20,000 in legal fees instead.

On 7 October 2005, Boy George was arrested in Manhattan on suspicion of cocaine possession and falsely reporting a burglary. Boy George denied that the drugs were his. In court on 1 February 2006, the cocaine possession charge was dropped and Boy George pleaded guilty to falsely reporting a burglary. He was sentenced to five days of community service, fined US$1,000 and ordered to attend a drug rehabilitation programme. On 17 June 2006, a Manhattan judge issued a warrant for the arrest of Boy George after he failed to appear in court for a hearing on why Boy George wanted to change his sentence for the false burglary report. Boy George's attorney informed the court that he had advised Boy George not to appear at that hearing. On 14 August 2006, Boy George reported to the New York City Department of Sanitation for his court-ordered community service. As a result of the intense media coverage, he was allowed to finish his community service inside the Sanitation Department grounds and out of public view.

=== 2007 false imprisonment and assault of escort ===
On 5 December 2008, Boy George was convicted in Snaresbrook Crown Court, London, of the April 2007 assault and false imprisonment of Audun Carlsen, a Norwegian model and male escort, who initially stood for a photography session with Boy George. Carlsen alleged that he had been handcuffed to a wall fixture and beaten with a metal chain during their next meeting. Boy George maintained that only the handcuffing was true and that he never beat Carlsen. Defence counsel presented the effects of his long-term drug use as a mitigating factor. On 16 January 2009, Boy George was sentenced to 15 months' imprisonment for these offences. He was initially incarcerated at HM Prison Pentonville in London, but was then transferred to HM Prison Highpoint North in Suffolk. He was given early release after four months on 11 May 2009. He was required to wear an ankle monitor and submit to a curfew for the remainder of his sentence.

In December 2009, while still on licensed release from prison, Boy George made a request to the Probation Service that he be allowed to appear on the seventh series of Celebrity Big Brother (to be broadcast on Channel 4). His request was denied. The Probation Service argued that public confidence in the criminal justice system could be undermined if George earned "a lucrative sum" and used his appearance on the show to promote himself. They also said George's participation would pose "a high level of risk" to the service's reputation.

=== 2023 settlement ===
In March 2023, a settlement was reached by the four original members of Culture Club, who agreed that George, Hay, and Craig would pay Moss £1.75 million, after he had filed a lawsuit against his former bandmates for lost income due to having allegedly been "expelled" from the group in 2018. The settlement required that Moss relinquish any and all rights to the Culture Club name and its use. Moss later filed bankruptcy proceedings against George and Craig, which were dismissed in June 2023.

== Memoirs ==
HarperCollins published Boy George's first autobiography, Take It Like a Man, in 1995, co-written with Spencer Bright. Both the book and his solo album, Cheapness and Beauty, were released simultaneously and dealt with the same themes. Take It Like a Man was a best-seller in the UK.

In 2005, Century published Straight, his second autobiography, this time co-written with author Paul Gorman. It was on The Sunday Times best-seller list for six weeks. Straight begins where Take It Like a Man had ended, though the two works are different in style, due to their different co-authors.

O'Dowd's third memoir, Karma: My Autobiography, again ghost-written by Spencer Bright, was published first in the UK by Blink Publishing in November 2023, followed by the US publication in January 2024 by Mango Publishing. In a review of the book, The Guardian wrote: "This is George O'Dowd in all his exhausting glory."

== Awards ==
Award	Year	Nominee(s)	Category	Result	Ref.
British LGBT Awards	2015	Himself	Music Artist	Nominated	
British LGBT Awards	2016	Himself	Celebrity	Nominated	
British LGBT Awards	2026	Himself	Music Artist	Pending	
Grammy Awards	1984	Culture Club	Best New Artist	Won	
Grammy Awards	1984	"Do You Really Want to Hurt Me"	Best Pop Performance by a Duo or Group with Vocals	Nominated	
Grammy Awards	1994	"The Crying Game"	Best Pop Vocal Performance, Male	Nominated	
Grammy Awards	1999	"When Will You Learn"	Best Dance Recording	Nominated	
MTV Video Music Awards	1985	"It's a Miracle"	Best Art Direction in a Video	Nominated	
MTV Video Music Awards	1985	"It's a Miracle"	Best Special Effects in a Video	Nominated	
MTV Video Music Awards	1993	"The Crying Game"	Best Video from a Film	Nominated	

Year	Awards	Work	Category	Result
2002	BT Digital Music Awards	Himself	People's Choice Award	Nominated
2004	Tony Awards	Taboo	Best Original Score	Nominated
2004	Drama Desk Awards	Taboo	Outstanding Music	Nominated
2004	Drama Desk Awards	Taboo	Outstanding Lyrics	Nominated
2005	Lunas del Auditorio	Himself	Espectaculo Alternativo	Nominated
2010	Antville Music Video Awards	"Somebody to Love Me" (ft. Mark Ronson)	Best Art Direction	Nominated
2011	Popjustice £20 Music Prize	"Somebody to Love Me" (ft. Mark Ronson)	Best British Pop Single	Nominated
2011	UK Music Video Awards	"Somebody to Love Me" (ft. Mark Ronson)	Best Pop Video (UK)	Nominated
2011	D&AD Awards	"Somebody to Love Me" (ft. Mark Ronson)	Best Music Video	Nominated
2015	Ivor Novello Awards	Himself	Outstanding Contribution to British Music	Won
2015	British LGBT Awards	Himself	Best Music Artist	Nominated
2016	British LGBT Awards	Himself	Celebrity	Nominated
2016	International Dance Music Awards	"Just Another Guy" (ft. Vanilla Ace & Katerina Themis)	Best Indie Dance Track	Nominated
2018	Attitude Awards	Himself	Music Icon	Won
2019	Classic Pop Readers' Awards	Boy George & Culture Club	Group of the Year	Nominated

== Discography ==
- Sold (1987)
- Tense Nervous Headache (1988)
- Boyfriend (1989)
- The Martyr Mantras (1991)
- Cheapness and Beauty (1995)
- The Unrecoupable One Man Bandit (1998)
- U Can Never B2 Straight (2002)
- Yum Yum (2004)
- Ordinary Alien (2010)
- This Is What I Do (2013)
- This Is What I Dub, Vol. 1 (2020)
- Cool Karaoke, Vol. 1 (2021)
- SE18 (2025)

== Filmography ==
Year	Title	Role
1986	The A-Team	Himself; guest star as a member of Culture Club in "Cowboy George", episode 16 season 4
2002–2004	Taboo	Leigh Bowery
2003	Hollyoaks	Himself; guest star
2003	The Kumars at No. 42	Himself; guest star (Episode 3.6)
2016	The Voice UK	Himself; judge/coach
2017–2020	The Voice Australia	Himself; judge/coach
2016	Stand Up to Cancer UK	Himself; contestant
2016	Project Runway All Stars	Himself; guest star
2017	The New Celebrity Apprentice	Himself; contestant
2018	Who Do You Think You Are?	Himself
2021	The Big Deal	Himself; host
2022	I'm a Celebrity...Get Me Out of Here!	Himself; contestant
2025	KPopped	Himself; contestant

== Bibliography ==
- George, Boy (2007). Foreword. Cry Salty Tears. By O'Dowd, Dinah. Century. ISBN 9781846052361.

Awards and achievements
Preceded by Gabry Ponte with "Tutta l'Italia"	San Marino in the Eurovision Song Contest; 2026 (with Senhit)	Succeeded by TBD
