= John Themis =

Australian musician, songwriter and record producer

- Born: John Themistocleous; Melbourne, Australia
- Occupations: Musician; songwriter; composer; record producer; arranger
- Instruments: Guitar, bouzouki, lute, percussion, vocals

John Themis (born John Themistocleous) is an Australian musician, songwriter, composer and record producer, particularly associated with his long-running musical collaborations with British musician Boy George and Boy George's bands Culture Club and Jesus Loves You. His work encompasses songwriting, guitar playing, musical arrangement and record production. Themis has also contributed to recordings by numerous other artists, including Kylie Minogue, Emma Bunton, George Michael, Rod Stewart and The Sugababes.

== Early life and background ==
Themis was born in Melbourne, Australia, to a family of Cypriot heritage. His elder brother taught him to play guitar when he was nine years old. According to a 2005 interview with the Cyprus Mail, his family initially opposed his ambition to pursue a career in music.

In 1967, Themis moved from Australia to Cyprus, where he spent two years in military service. He subsequently moved to London in 1974, originally intending to study economics, and remained based there as he developed his musical career.

== Career ==
=== Early recordings ===
Before establishing himself as a songwriter and record producer for other performers, Themis released music under his own name, including the albums Ulysees and the Cyclops (1984), Sirens (1984), Atmospheric Conditions (1985) and English Renaissance (1987).

His musical work includes guitar, Spanish guitar, bouzouki, lute and percussion, and his recording credits encompass performance, composition, arrangement and production.

=== Collaborations with Boy George and Culture Club ===
Themis developed a longstanding professional relationship with British musician Boy George, working with him on recordings and musical projects associated with his solo career and his bands Culture Club and Jesus Loves You, including received songwriting, production, guitar and musical-direction credits on a number of albums such as The Martyr Mantras (1991), Cheapness and Beauty (1995), and Culture Club's Don't Mind If I Do (1999).

=== Songwriting and production ===
Themis has collaborated with a wide range of other artists as a songwriter, musician and producer. His songwriting credits include several commercially successful singles.

In 2000, he co-wrote "Please Stay", recorded by Kylie Minogue for her album Light Years, along with Minogue, Richard Stannard and Julian Gallagher. Themis also performed guitar on the recording.

In 2001, Themis co-wrote Emma Bunton's "What Took You So Long?" along with Bunton, Stannard, Gallagher, Martin Harrington and Dave Morgan. The single reached number one on the UK singles chart, remaining at the top for two weeks.

Themis has also worked with artists including Dido, Gabrielle, Rod Stewart, George Michael, Stevie Wonder, Spice Girls, Sugababes, Will Young, Natalie Imbruglia, Elton John, Cher, Dolly Parton, Blondie, Pet Shop Boys, Anna Vissi, Ofra Haza and Lulu.

=== Eurovision Song Contest ===
In 2005, Themis was involved in writing "Touch My Fire", performed by British singer Javine, which represented the United Kingdom at the Eurovision Song Contest 2005 in Kyiv, Ukraine. It was selected through the BBC's national selection competition Eurovision: Making Your Mind Up. The song was also credited to Javine and Jonathan Shalit as co-writers.

"Touch My Fire" finished 22nd in the Eurovision final, receiving 18 points, and released as a single reached number 18 in the UK singles chart.

=== Musical theatre ===
Themis contributed to the musical Taboo, which was created by Boy George and depicts the London New Romantic scene of the 1980s. The production features music and lyrics by Boy George, with Themis credited as one of its music co-writers alongside Kevan Frost and Richie Stevens.

The original London West End production opened in January 2002 and ran until April 2003. The musical subsequently transferred to Broadway in 2003.

=== Other work ===
In addition to his commercial recording and songwriting work, Themis composed music for the BBC's coverage of the 2004 Summer Olympics in Athens, Greece.

== Selected discography ==
=== Solo albums ===
- Ulysees and the Cyclops (1984)
- Sirens (1984)
- Atmospheric Conditions (1985)
- English Renaissance (1987)
