= Taboo (musical) =

Stage musical

- Cover for the Original London Cast Recording
- Music: Boy George; Kevan Frost; John Themis; Richie Stevens
- Lyrics: Boy George
- Book: Mark Davies Markham; Charles Busch
- Productions: 2002 West End; 2003 Broadway; 2003 UK Tour; 2012 Brixton Revival

Taboo is a stage musical with a book by Mark Davies Markham (extensively rewritten for the Broadway production by Charles Busch), lyrics by Boy George, and music by George, John Themis, Richie Stevens, and Kevan Frost.

Set in an abandoned London warehouse, the show tells the story of a group of people (partly based on real people and partly fictional), some of whom had been connected to the New Romantic club scene some years earlier, culminating with the opening of the now-legendary Taboo (1985–87) of the title, which was the creation of Leigh Bowery, at the end of Act I. Boy George is featured as one of the club's regulars, as he was known to have been in the 1980s, and the show also focuses on George's life prior to and after achieving fame.

== Productions ==
=== London, The Venue 2002 ===
The cast featured Euan Morton as Boy George, whose vocal performance and physical resemblance to the Culture Club frontman earned widespread critical acclaim and a Laurence Olivier Award nomination for Best Actor in a Musical. Critics praised Morton as delivering "a mesmerising performance that elsewhere would literally be showstopping" and noted he was "the spitting image of George in his youth." The Guardian's Michael Billington described the musical as "impossible to dislike". The production also included Luke Evans as Billy James, Matt Lucas as Leigh Bowery, and Dianne Pilkington as Kim, with the show directed by Christopher Renshaw with choreography by Les Child and costume design by Mike Nicholls.

=== Broadway, 2003 ===
Comedian/talk-show host Rosie O'Donnell was so enamoured with the show that she decided to finance a Broadway production. After 16 previews, a new revised version of Taboo opened on November 13, 2003, at the Plymouth Theatre, with a new book by Charles Busch. Hampered by mostly scathing reviews, the production closed after 100 performances. The cast, directed by Christopher Renshaw, included Boy George (credited under his real name, George O'Dowd), Euan Morton reprising his role as Boy George, Raúl Esparza and Jeffrey Carlson.

O'Donnell reportedly lost her entire $10 million investment in the project. She said in a 2007 interview about Leigh Bowery that she wanted to take Taboo back to Broadway in the future.

=== London, Brixton Club House 2012 ===
A revival of the original London Taboo ran from September to March 2013 at the Brixton Club House in London. The show was directed by original director Renshaw and included original cast member Paul Baker as Philip Sallon, with The Voice contestant Sam Buttery as Leigh Bowery, newcomer Matthew Rowland as Boy George/George O'Dowd and Alistair Brammer as Billy.

== Plot ==
=== 2002 London production ===
==== Act 1 ====
The show starts with Philip Sallon introducing the audience to the New Romantics in London's Soho district ("Ode To Attention Seekers").

The focus moves to the James family home in Bromley, where Billy lives with his mum, Josie, and dad, Derek, who is unemployed thanks to the new laws brought by the Thatcher era. Billy's dad disapproves of him wanting to be a photographer and, after another fight, Billy snaps and decides to move to London ("Safe In the City").

Here, Billy runs into Sallon, who tells him he knows of a place where he can stay, squatting with a few other people ("Gimme A Freak"). Billy meets Kim, a punk girl who wants to be a fashion designer, and George, her housemate. Billy is fascinated by George, the two start talking and George shares that his father never approved of him, only his mother understood and loved him ("Stranger In This World"). George kisses Billy, taking him by surprise, Billy runs off scared.

The audience is introduced to Steve Strange, who is acting as bouncer at the local night club. Kim, Billy, Philip and George arrive at the club and Billy is fascinated by the club's patrons and begins to take pictures. Steve Strange premieres his new hit record ("Fade To Grey"), but the audience of the club don't appreciate hearing it again, so they pull the plug halfway through his performance. The audience is then introduced to another popular face on the New Romantic scene, Marilyn, dressed up like Marilyn Monroe ("Genocide Peroxide").

Leigh Bowery, a fashion designer and performance artist who travelled from Australia to be a part of the New Romantic scene, is in the men's bathroom of the club. Billy enters and is amazed by Leigh's outlandish look. Leigh is instantly attracted to the photographer ("I'll Have You All") and gives him his number ("I'll Have You - Reprise").

With time Kim and Billy become closer and start falling for each other ("Love Is a Question Mark"). Just when they are about to take the next step in their relationship, George comes home and makes a scene by flirting with Billy. George and Kim start to argue, which makes Billy runs off again, being sick of the fighting. Out on the street late at night, Petal is selling drugs ("Shelter"), Billy bumps into him and expresses his disgust at Petal and is almost attacked by him, but escapes.

Billy's mom is on the phone with Kim. After the call, Kim starts to question whether Billy will still like her even if she removes all her makeup and opens up to him ("Pretty Lies"). Billy arrives and shares with Kim how beautiful she looks without her makeup. Kim apologizes and the conversation leads to Kim and Billy moving to the bedroom. ("Love Is A Question Mark - Reprise")

George, annoyed that Billy wants to be with Kim instead of him, joins Marilyn and heads down to Selfridges to do some shopping. George tells Marilyn that he's met a drummer who wants him to sing in his band, Culture Club. The two discuss their fantasies of being famous ("Guttersnipe").

Josie is at home missing Billy and wondering where her life went so wrong, she doesn't love her abusive husband anymore and her life is just going in no direction ("Talk Amongst Yourselves"). She calls Billy and Phillip answers the phone instead. He invites Josie down to London and Josie wholeheartedly decides to go.

George is recording a demo with his new group and the session is stopped when the producer realises that George was singing about another man("The Eyes of Medusa"). George records a different song to keep the producer happy ("Do You Really Want To Hurt Me"). Culture Club start to rise to fame and their single hits number 1.

George runs into Jayney, a journalist who now works for the Sun magazine, she is interested in George after his success and begs him for an interview. As Jane leaves, Billy bumps into her and tells her he's got some pictures of George and asks if the paper would buy them. Jane isn't interested but, she hands Billy her card if he ever has any juicy stories about George.

Billy asks George if he could put a word in for him at his record company to be a photographer, but George leaves. Leigh is entering his latest creation in to a talent contest called the Miss Mud Day Queen Ball and wants Billy to model for him. ("Guttersnipe - Reprise") When Billy gets to Leigh's house, Leigh begins to give Billy a makeover to turn him in to a star of the New Romantic scene ("Touched By The Hand Of Cool"). Leigh tells Billy he will make him the talk of the town and proceeds to call everyone telling them that Billy is now one of his models and will be in the show. Rumours also start that Billy is sleeping with Leigh, which get back to Kim leaving her heartbroken ("Church Of The Poisoned Mind").

It's the day of the Miss Mud Day Queen Ball and Leigh's collection wins the contest, with Billy, now nicknamed Spartacus. Leigh announces he is opening a club called Taboo. Kim and Josie arrive and are shocked at what they see. Kim is outraged at the thought of Billy sleeping with Leigh and his mother is disappointed in him and the two leave Billy alone ("Stranger In This World Reprise").

==== Act 2 ====
Taboo is now open and everyone who is anyone is there ("Everything Taboo"). Kim and Josie, who has decided to leave Billy's dad and stay with Kim in London, go to the club. Whilst there they decide to team up and create a fashion line of their own and rent a flat from Philip. Billy is now hanging out with George and Kim seeing them together, presumes that they are sleeping together. Billy tries to apologise to Kim about the Leigh Bowery incident but Kim doesn't want to hear it, so Billy tells Leigh he doesn't want to work as his model anymore in an attempt to get back with Kim. Josie tells Billy she is ashamed of him and what he's done to Kim.

George now deeply affected by fame has begun to take drugs with Petal and Marilyn at the club. Billy asks George if he can work at Virgin Records and be the official Boy George photographer again and George agrees.

Josie and Kim are at home and their business is starting to take off, the two have also become good friends with Philip. Josie's husband, Derek, arrives and asks Josie to come back home, but she refuses. He takes an instant dislike to Philip and Kim and verbally abuses them causing Josie to kick him out ("Independent Woman").

Back in George's apartment, he and Marilyn are having a drug binge and George's habit has gotten completely out of control. Billy enters annoyed at George after going to Virgin Records expecting a job but realizing George had not set it up. He tells George to stop using drugs or he will be risking his life ("I See Through You").

Walking home from the shop, Philip sees Josie's husband at the bus stop. Philip tells him that Josie did the right thing ending it with him. Derek beats Philip up in the street, leaving him bruised and bloodied ("Petrified").

Leigh's live-in helper, Sue, opens a giant curtain to reveal that Leigh has installed himself behind a sheet of glass as a work of art at an art gallery. He explains to the audience that he is art (Ich Bin Kunst). After his performance Sue tells Leigh that he needs to go to the hospital for a check up, but Leigh won't go, hinting he's scared about his HIV positive status. ("Ich Bin Kunst - Reprise")

Billy has been to New York to photograph Marilyn's first concert to launch his debut single. When he arrives in London, he goes to see his mom, Kim, and Philip. Kim still refuses to talk to him, but Billy tells her that he can't stop thinking about her and apologizes for sleeping with George. Kim starts to come around but unfortunately all efforts are wasted as George turns up at the house and has a go at Billy for leaving him and going to New York with Marilyn. George collapses in a heap on the floor.

Billy meets up with Jayney and gives her pictures of George using drugs and the full story about his addiction. He takes no money, he does it thinking that it will push George to get help. The story breaks and the media is outraged at George. ("Do You Really Want To Hurt Me - Reprise")

George is arrested for possession of drugs and the seriousness of his addiction hits him. George, Steve Strange, Marilyn and Billy all ponder how they have his rock bottom ("Out Of Fashion"). At the hospital Leigh lays dying of AIDS, his trusted friend Sue is the only with him when he dies ("Il Adore").

Billy tries to stop Petal from selling drugs to a young boy and ends up in fight with him. The dealer pulls a knife on Billy but just in the nick of time George turns up to rescue him. The two talk about everything what has happened and the mistakes they have made. Billy apologizes for informing the media about George's addiction, but George tells him that Billy, revealing the story, saved his life ("Pie In The Sky").

Billy tells George he's going to India to take some time to study with the Hare Krishners and that George should join him. So George, Billy, Philip, Kim, and Josie all go travel to India. After a few weeks the group decides to go home, after finding the answers they were looking for, but Billy decides he's going to stay a little longer ("Bow Down Mister"). The entire company sing ("Karma Chameleon") as they leave the stage.

=== 2003 Broadway production ===
The Broadway production of the show switched its focus to George, from his roots to his rise to fame with Culture Club, and Leigh Bowery, from his start until his timely death because of AIDS, removing some of the key characters of the UK production in favor of new ones. Philip Sallon and Big Sue become narrators of the story and Billy become Marcus, a sexually confused photographer who falls for George. The new figure of Nicola was introduced, based on real-life friend and later wife of Bowery, Nicola Bateman.

In an interview Boy George said that the Broadway version of the show "brings out more of an "emotional aspect of the characters", going deeper in exploring the main characters of George and Leigh.

== Characters ==
=== Original London production (2002), UK tour and Brixton Club House production (2012) ===
- Billy – Aspiring photographer. Frustrated with suburban life in Bromley, he runs to London to make his fortune. There he is introduced to the New Romantics.
- Kim – Aspiring fashion designer and George's squat-mate. Kim is fiery but insecure, rarely emerging from behind her makeup. She ran away from home at 15, and her mother was too drunk to come looking for her.
- George (O'Dowd) – Artist, poet, singer/songwriter George is shown before and during his initial success. Thrives on attention and shocking others, never appears dressed conventionally.
- Leigh Bowery – Flamboyant Australian designer and performance artist. He delights in antagonising Kim, and is constantly surrounded by a gaggle of admirers/slaves. Absorbs Billy into his flock. Played by Boy George on some productions.
- Philip Sallon – Narrator figure of the show. Based on a real person.
- Josie James – Billy's mother, who later becomes Kim's best friend and business partner. Supposedly a part written specially for the performer Lyn Paul to play.
- Marilyn – One of the Blitz Kids, Marilyn is first George's rival, then his best friend.
- Big Sue – Leigh's main assistant and confidante. Character based on Sue Tilley.
- Steve Strange – Doorman at the 'Blitz' club, and singer with the group Visage who achieved success with 'Fade to Grey'. Good-natured rival of George.
- Derek – Billy's father. Violent, drunk and homophobic.
- Petal – Cross-dressing drug pusher. Played by the actor portraying Billy's father. During previews, Petal killed Billy near the end of the show.
- Jayney – Reporter for the Sun newspaper, has a connection to George.

=== Original Broadway production (2003) ===
- George (O'Dowd) – Artist, poet, singer/songwriter George is shown before and during his initial success. Thrives on attention and shocking others, never appears dressed conventionally.
- Leigh Bowery – Flamboyant Australian designer and performance artist. He is constantly surrounded by a gaggle of admirers/slaves.
- Philip Sallon and Big Sue – Narrators of the show.
- Nicola – Character who falls for and eventually marries Leigh Bowery. Based on a real person.
- Marcus – Sexually confused photographer, who has an attraction for George (rewrite of the character of Billy from the UK productions).

== Casts ==
Character	London, The Venue	Broadway	London, Brixton Club House
Character	2002	2003	2012
Billy James	Luke Evans	-	Alistair Brammer
Marcus	-	Cary Shields	-
George O'Dowd	Euan Morton	Euan Morton	Matthew Rowland
Kim	Dianne Pilkington	-	Niamh Perry
Leigh Bowery	Matt Lucas	George O'Dowd	Sam Buttery
Nicola	-	Sarah Uriarte Berry	-
Philip Sallon	Paul Baker	Raúl Esparza	Paul Baker
Big Sue	Gail Mackinnon	Liz McCartney	Katie Kerr
Josie James	Gemma Craven	Denise Summerford	Sarah Ingram
Derek/Petal	Mark White	-	Michael Matus
Marilyn	Marc McGee	Jeffrey Carlson	Adam Bailey
Steve Strange	Drew Jaymson	-	Owain Williams
Jayney	Nicola Dawn	-	

== Songs ==
=== Original London Production (2002) & UK tour ===
Act I

- "Ode To Attention Seekers" – Philip Sallon and Freaks
- "Safe In The City" – Billy
- "Freak" – Philip Sallon and Freaks
- "Stranger In This World" – Boy George and Josie
- “Fade to Grey” – Steve Strange and Princess Julta
- "Genocide Peroxide" – Marilyn and Ensemble
- "I'll Have You All" – Leigh Bowery and Billy
- “I’ll Have You All” (Reprise) - Leigh Bowery and Phillip Sallon
- "Love Is A Question Mark" – Billy and Kim
- "Shelter" – Petal and Tarts
- "Pretty Lies" – Kim
- "Love Is A Question Mark" (Reprise) - Phillp
- "Guttersnipe" – George and Marilyn
- "Talk Amongst Yourselves" – Josie
- "The Eyes of Medusa" / Do You Really Want To Hurt Me" – Boy George
- "Guttersnipe" (Reprise) – Billy
- "Touched By The Hand Of Cool" – Leigh Bowery, Billy and Slaves
- “Church of the Poison Mind” – Kay Cole and Ensemble
- "Stranger In This World" (Reprise) – Billy, Marilyn, Petal, Steve Strange, Big Sue and Ensemble

Act II

- "Everything Taboo" – Leigh Bowery and Full Company
- "Independent Woman" – Josie, Kim and Phillip Sallon
- "I See Through You" – Billy
- "Petrified" – Philip Sallon
- "Ich Bin Kunst" – Leigh Bowery
- "Ich Bin Kunst" (Reprise) – Leigh Bowery
- “Do You Really Want To Hurt Me (Reprise) – Ensemble
- "Out Of Fashion" – Steve Strange, Billy, Boy George and Marilyn
- "Il Adore" – Big Sue
- "Pie in the Sky" – Boy George and Billy
- Bow Down Mister" – Full Company

Encore:

- "Karma Chameleon" – Ensemble

=== Original Broadway Production (2003) ===
Act I

- "Freak/Ode To Attention Seekers" – Philip Sallon
- "Stranger In This World" – George, Philip and Big Sue
- "Safe In The City" – Nicola
- "Dress To Kill" – George, Philip and Marcus
- "Genocide Peroxide" – Marilyn
- "I'll Have You All" – Leigh
- "Sexual Confusion" – Marcus, George, Big Sue and Philip
- "Pretty Lies" – George
- "Guttersnipe" – Marilyn and George
- "Love is a Question Mark" - Marcus, George, Leigh and Nicola
- "Do You Really Want To Hurt Me" – George
- "Church of the Poison Mind/Karma Chameleon" – George

Act II

- "Everything Taboo" – Leigh and Company
- "Talk Amongst Yourselves" – Big Sue
- "The Fame Game" – George
- "I See Through You" – Marcus
- "Ich Bin Kunst" – Leigh
- "Petrified" – Philip
- "Out Of Fashion" – George, Marcus, Marilyn, Leigh and Philip
- "Il Adore" – Big Sue
- "Come on in From the Outside" – Company

=== 2012 London Revival ===
- "Ode To Attention Seekers" – Philip and Freaks
- "Safe In The City" – Billy
- "Stranger In This World" – George and Josie
- "Dress To Kill" – Freaks
- "Fade To Grey" – Steve Strange and Princess Julia
- "Genocide Peroxide" – Marilyn
- "I'll Have You All" – Leigh
- "Love Is A Question Mark" – Billy and Kim
- "Shelter" – Petal and Tarts
- "Pretty Lies" – Kim and George
- "Guttersnipe" – Marilyn, George and Company
- "Talk Amongst Yourselves" – Josie
- "The Eyes Of Medusa / Do You Really Want To Hurt Me" – George
- "Touched By The Hands Of Cool" – Leigh, Sue and Slaves
- "Talk Amongst Yourselves" (Reprise) – Derek
- "Stranger In This World" (Reprise) – Billy, Marilyn, Steve, George, Leigh and Philip

Act II

- "Everything Taboo" – Leigh and Company
- "No Need To Work So Hard" – Philip, Kim and Josie
- "I See Through You" – Billy
- "Petrified" – Philip
- "Ich Bin Kunst" – Leigh and Sue
- "No Need To Work So Hard / Stranger In This World (Reprise)" – Josie, Kim and Billy
- "Il Adore" – Big Sue
- "Out Of Fashion" – Steve, George, Marilyn and Billy
- "Pie In The Sky" – George, Kim and Billy
- "Come On In From the Outside" – Company

Encore:

- "Karma Chameleon" – Company

== Awards and nominations ==
=== Original London production ===
Year	Award	Category	Nominee	Result
2003	Laurence Olivier Award	Best New Musical		Nominated
2003	Laurence Olivier Award	Best Actor in a Musical	Euan Morton	Nominated
2003	Laurence Olivier Award	Best Performance in a Supporting Role in a Musical	Paul Baker	Won
2003	Laurence Olivier Award	Best Costume Design	Mike Nicholls	Nominated

=== Original Broadway production ===
Year	Award	Category	Nominee	Result
2004	Tony Award	Best Original Score	Boy George	Nominated
2004	Tony Award	Best Performance by a Leading Actor in a Musical	Euan Morton	Nominated
2004	Tony Award	Best Performance by a Featured Actor in a Musical	Raúl Esparza	Nominated
2004	Tony Award	Best Costume Design	Mike Nicholls and Bobby Pearce	Nominated
2004	Drama Desk Award	Outstanding Actor in a Musical	Euan Morton	Nominated
2004	Drama Desk Award	Outstanding Featured Actor in a Musical	Raúl Esparza	Won
2004	Drama Desk Award	Outstanding Featured Actor in a Musical	Jeffrey Carlson	Nominated
2004	Drama Desk Award	Outstanding Lyrics	Boy George	Nominated
2004	Drama Desk Award	Outstanding Music	Boy George	Nominated
2004	Theatre World Award		Euan Morton	Won

=== 2012 London revival ===
Year	Award	Category	Result
2013	WhatsOnStage Awards	Best Off-West End Production	Won

== Cast recordings ==
Two Taboo cast albums have been released: the original West End cast in 2002, and the original Broadway cast in 2004.

=== Original London Cast Recording ===
No.	Title	Writer(s)	Performer(s)	Length
1.	"Ode to Attention Seekers"	George O'Dowd; John Themis	Paul Baker	2:33
2.	"Safe in the City"	O'Dowd; Kevan Frost	Luke Evans	3:29
3.	"Freak"	O'Dowd; Themis; Richie Stevens	Paul Baker	2:25
4.	"Stranger in This World"	O'Dowd; Themis; Stevens	Euan Morton	3:44
5.	"Genocide Peroxide"	O'Dowd; Themis	Mark McGee	2:15
6.	"I'll Have You All"	O'Dowd; Frost	Boy George, Paul Baker, Luke Evans	2:11
7.	"Love Is a Question Mark"	O'Dowd; Frost	Luke Evans, Dianne Pilkington	2:52
8.	"Shelter"	O'Dowd; Stevens; Frost	Mark White	2:33
9.	"Pretty Lies"	O'Dowd; Frost	Dianne Pilkington	3:55
10.	"Guttersnipe"	O'Dowd; Frost	Euan Morton, Mark McGee	2:26
11.	"Talk Amongst Yourselves"	O'Dowd; Frost	Lyn Paul	4:29
12.	"Do You Really Want to Hurt Me"	O'Dowd; Roy Hay; Mikey Craig; Jon Moss	Euan Morton, Drew Jaymson, Gail Mackinnon, Lucy Newton, Kevan Frost	5:12
13.	"Touched by the Hand of Cool"	O'Dowd; Frost	Ensemble	3:32
14.	"Everything Taboo"	O'Dowd; Frost	Ensemble	3:48
15.	"Petrified"	O'Dowd; Themis; Stevens	Paul Baker	3:37
16.	"I See Through You"	O'Dowd; Themis; Stevens	Luke Evans	3:34
17.	"Independent Woman"	O'Dowd; Frost	Gemma Craven, Paul Baker, Dianne Pilkington	2:49
18.	"Ich Bin Kunst"	O'Dowd; Frost	Matt Lucas	2:33
19.	"Out of Fashion"	O'Dowd; Judge Jules; Paul Masterson	Drew Jaymson	6:14
20.	"Il Adore"	O'Dowd; Themis	Gail Mackinnon	4:25
21.	"Pie in the Sky"	O'Dowd; Frost	Euan Morton	3:54

- Additional performers and backing vocalists: Declan Bennett, Lucy Harris, Michele Hooper, Andy Morton, Joe Docherty, Zee Asha, Kim Whitehorn, Sharlene Hector.
- Majority of instruments and arrangements by Kevan Frost.
- Additional musicians: James McKeon, Justin Homewood, Chris Jago, Mark Kulke, Ben Castle, Chris Storr, Mike Innes, Pete Adams, Liz Chi, Sarah Chi, Ben Till, Matt Frost, Raul D'Olivera.

=== Original Broadway Cast Recording ===
No.	Title	Performer(s)	Length
1.	"Freak / Ode to Attention Seekers"	Raúl Esparza	3:53
2.	"Stranger in This World"	Euan Morton	3:35
3.	"Safe in the City"	Sarah Uriarte Berry	2:13
4.	"Dress to Kill"	Euan Morton, Raúl Esparza, Cary Shields	0:53
5.	"Genocide Peroxide"	Jeffrey Carlson	2:27
6.	"I'll Have You All"	Boy George	2:43
7.	"Sexual Confusion"	Cary Shields, Euan Morton, Liz McCartney ft. Raúl Esparza	3:19
8.	"Pretty Lies"	Euan Morton	1:57
9.	"Guttersnipe"	Euan Morton ft. Jeffrey Carlson	2:24
10.	"Love Is a Question Mark"	Euan Morton, Boy George, Cary Shields, Sarah Uriarte Berry	3:11
11.	"Do You Really Want to Hurt Me"	Euan Morton	2:33
12.	"Church of the Poison Mind / Karma Chameleon"	Euan Morton	2:10
13.	"Everything Taboo"	Boy George	2:48
14.	"Talk Amongst Yourselves"	Liz McCartney	3:10
15.	"The Fame Game"	Euan Morton	3:37
16.	"I See Through You"	Cary Shields	2:15
17.	"Ich Bin Kunst"	Boy George	3:27
18.	"Petrified"	Raúl Esparza	3:50
19.	"Out of Fashion"	Cary Shields, Euan Morton, Boy George, Jeffrey Carlson ft. Raúl Esparza	4:09
20.	"Il Adore"	Sarah Uriarte Berry	4:36
21.	"Come On In from the Outside"	Euan Morton, Raúl Esparza, Cary Shields, Liz McCartney	3:30
