= Kevan Frost =

British composer & musician

Kevan Frost is a British Tony Award and Drama Desk Award–nominated composer, musician, and record producer.

He is recognised for his work with the musical Taboo; composing the musical score for the production alongside Boy George. This earned him and his co-composer a nomination for a Tony Award for "Best Original Score" and a Drama Desk Award nomination for "Outstanding Music". The show debuted at the West End, before heading to Broadway for one hundred performances. Taboo then toured the UK in 2004. Frost had previously worked with Boy George as a producer for his 2002 acoustic album U Can Never B2 Straight and a musician for his 1999 album with Culture Club titled Don't Mind If I Do.

Frost is currently music director for Boy George and Culture Club. He also plays bass guitar in Boy George's band and percussion in Culture Club.

Frost is also known for his work with Matt Lucas, co-composing the music in his series Pompidou, Shooting Stars and Rock Profiles. The charity single "Thank You Baked Potato" by Lucas was produced and arranged by Frost and was number one in the UK Official streaming and download Chart.

In 2005, he produced the soundtrack album of the Christian theatre production Luv Esther.

The songs for the upcoming musical Hoods are co-written by Frost. He has also arranged and produced every song.

Brando, a new band managed by Boy George, are also being produced by Frost.

As a musician, Frost is multi-skilled. He features as an acoustic and electric guitarist on the Phatfish album Guaranteed, a keyboardist on the album Don't Mind If I Do by Culture Club and a bassist on Stuart Townend's 2008 live CD and DVD release There Is A Hope, recorded in Ireland. He is also credited on new material released by Boy George.

Frost has also played with Carleen Anderson, Mica Paris, Howard Jones, Rose Royce, Shalamar, Odyssey, Gloria Gaynor, Kim Wilde and Mark Ronson.
