= Notre-Dame du Haut =

Church in Ronchamp, France

Notre Dame du Haut

Religion
- Affiliation: Roman Catholic Church
- Ecclesiastical or organisational status: Pilgrimage Chapel
- Year consecrated: 25 June 1955

Location
- Location: Ronchamp, Haute-Saône, France
- Interactive map of Notre Dame du Haut
- Coordinates: 47°42′16.37″N 6°37′14.08″E

Architecture
- Architect: Le Corbusier
- Type: Church
- Style: Modern
- Groundbreaking: 1953
- Completed: 1955
- Materials: Concrete

Website
- www.collinenotredameduhaut.com

UNESCO World Heritage Site
- Official name: Chapelle Notre-Dame-du-Haut de Ronchamp
- Part of: The Architectural Work of Le Corbusier, an Outstanding Contribution to the Modern Movement
- Criteria: Cultural: (i), (ii), (vi)
- Reference: 1321-012
- Inscription: 2016 (40th Session)
- Area: 2.734 ha (0.01056 sq mi)
- Buffer zone: 239.661 ha (0.92534 sq mi)

Monument historique
- Official name: Chapelle Notre-Dame-du-Haut
- Designated: 1967
- Reference no.: PA00102263
- Denomination: Chapelle

Notre-Dame du Haut (English: Our Lady of the Heights; full name in French: Chapelle Notre-Dame du Haut) is a Roman Catholic chapel in Ronchamp, France. Built in 1955, it is one of the finest examples of the architecture of French-Swiss architect Le Corbusier. Blessed in 1955, it was consecrated in 2005. The chapel is a working religious building and is under the guardianship of the private foundation Association de l’Œuvre de Notre-Dame du Haut. It attracts 80,000 visitors each year. In 2016, it was inscribed on the UNESCO World Heritage List in along with sixteen other works by Le Corbusier, because of its importance to the development of modernist architecture.

== History ==
Notre-Dame du Haut is commonly thought of as a more extreme design of Le Corbusier's late style. Commissioned by the Association de l'Œuvre Notre-Dame du Haut, the chapel is a simple design with two entrances, a main altar, and three chapels beneath towers. Although the building is small, it is powerful and complex. The chapel is the latest of chapels at the site. The previous chapel was completely destroyed during World War II. The previous building was a 4th-century Christian chapel. At the time the new building was being constructed, Le Corbusier was not interested in Machine Age architecture; he felt that his style was more primitive and sculptural. He realized when he visited the site that he could not use mechanized means of construction, because access was too difficult.

On January 17, 2014, the chapel became the target of a break-in. A concrete collection box was thrown outside, and one of the stained-glass windows, also designed by Le Corbusier and the only one on the chapel to carry his signature, was broken.

== Site ==
Site plan and evolution: Le Corbusier (1955); 1: Notre-Dame-du-Haut chapel; 2: pyramid of peace; 3: pilgrim shelters; 4: chaplain's house; Jean Prouvé (1975); 5: campanile; Renzo Piano (2011); 6: Sainte-Claire chapel (oratory of the convent); 7: Sainte-Claire convent; 8: gatehouse (reception, exhibition room)

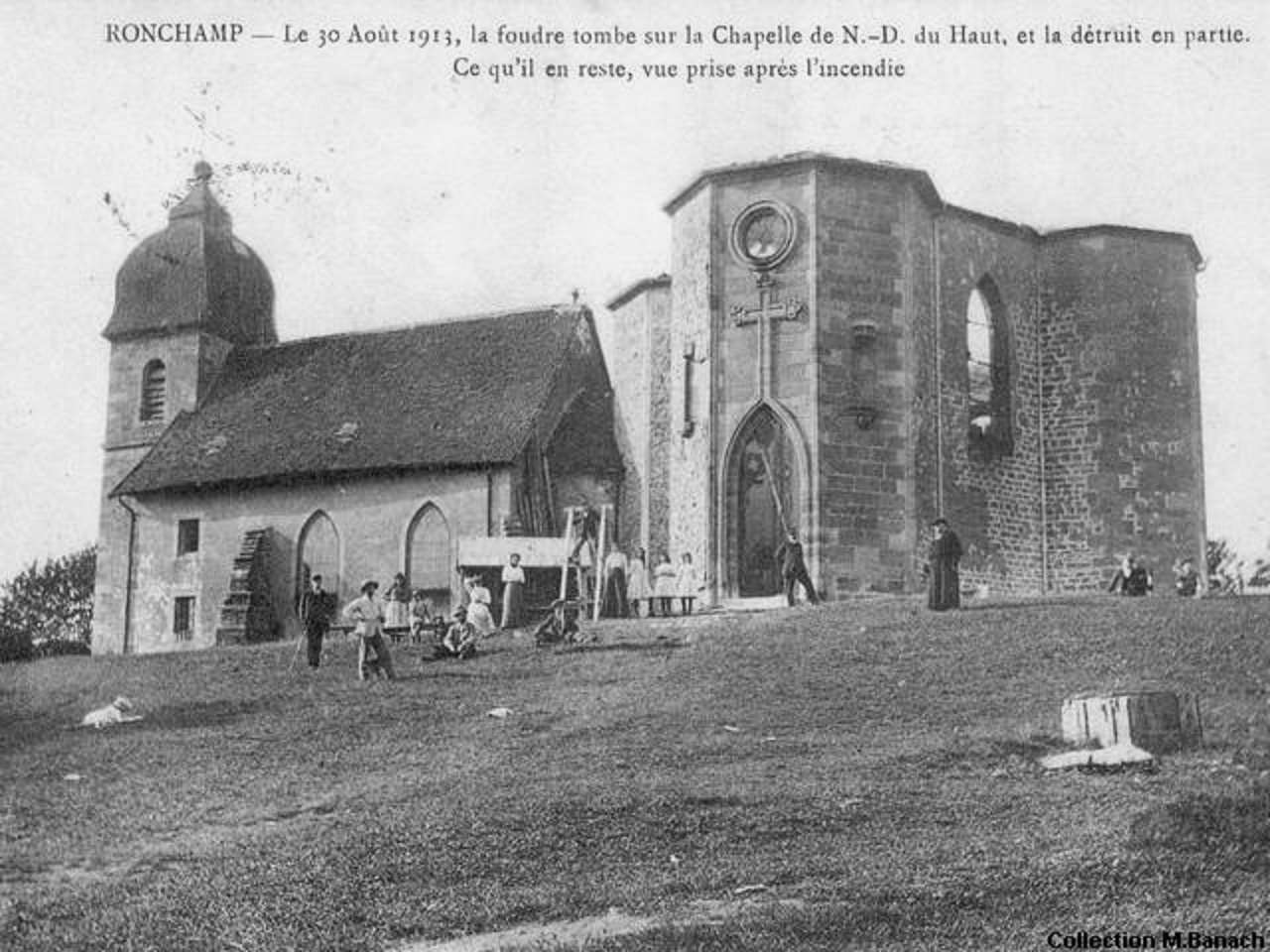
Remains of the 14th Century Chapel

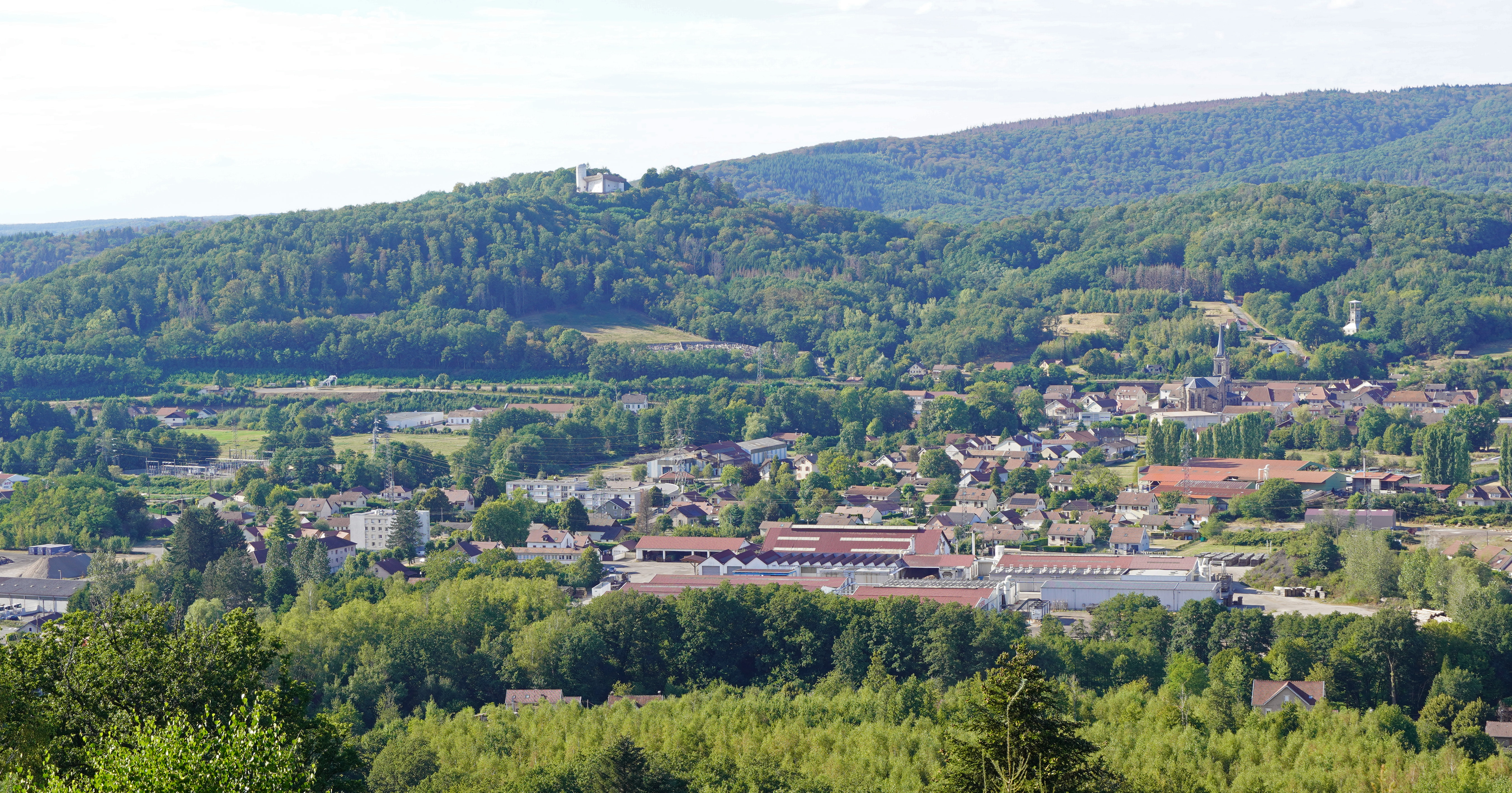
Location of Notre Dame du Haut

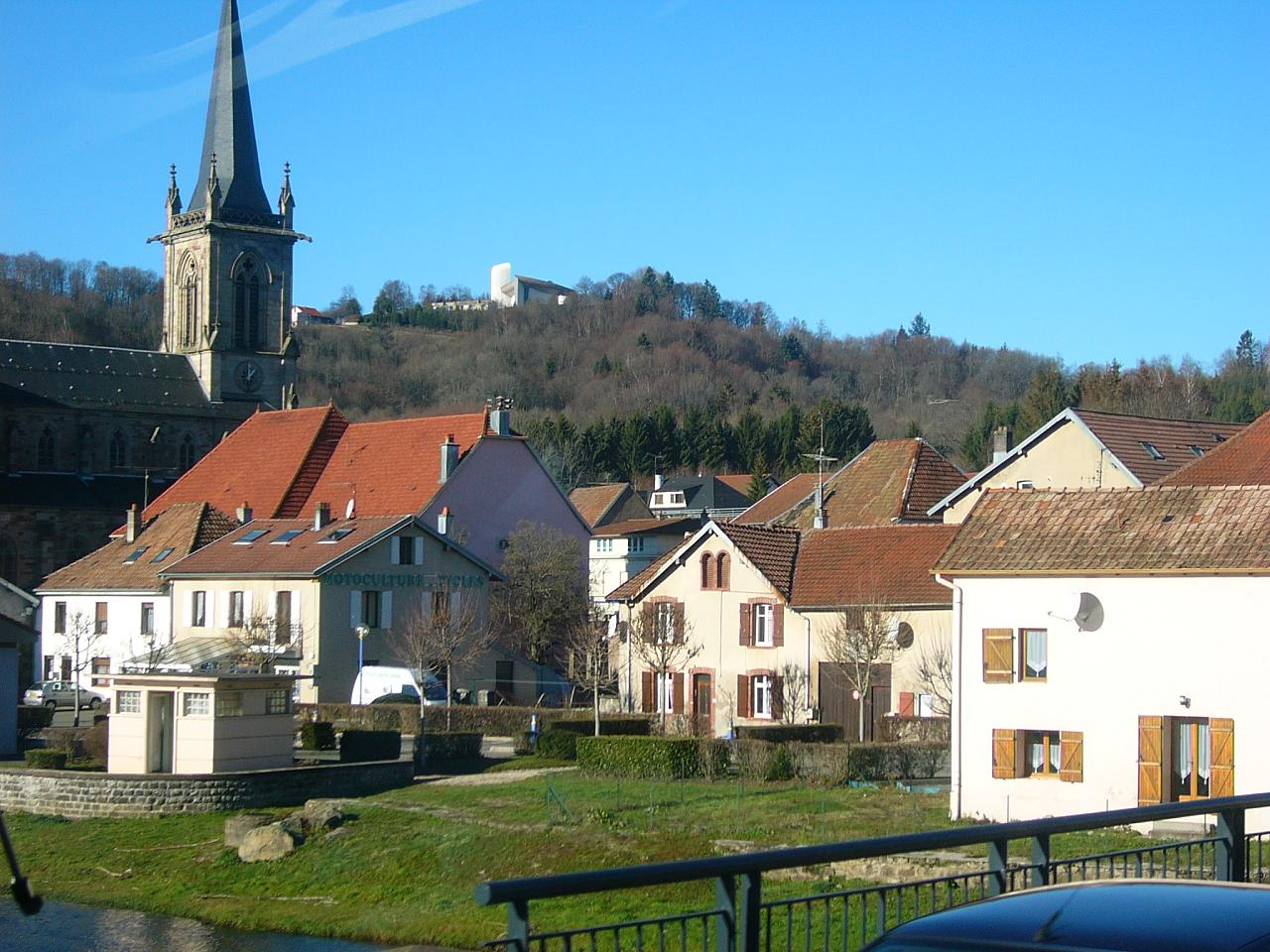

Notre-Dame du Haut at Ronchamp, designed by Le Corbusier

The site is high on a hill near Belfort in eastern France. There had been a pilgrimage chapel on the site dedicated to the Virgin Mary, but it was destroyed during the Second World War. After the war, it was decided to rebuild on the same site. The new chapel was built for a reformist Church looking to continue its relevance. Warning against decadence, reformers within the Church at the time looked to renew its spirit by embracing modern art and architecture as representative concepts. Father Marie-Alain Couturier, who would also sponsor Le Corbusier for the La Tourette commission, steered the unorthodox project to completion in 1954.

The chapel at Ronchamp is singular in Le Corbusier's oeuvre, in that it departs from his principles of standardisation and the machine aesthetic, giving in instead to a site-specific response. By Le Corbusier's own admission, it was the site that provided an irresistible genius loci for the response, with the horizon visible on all four sides of the hill and its historical legacy for centuries as a place of worship.

This historical legacy was woven in different layers into the terrain – from the Romans and sun-worshippers before them, to a cult of the Virgin in the Middle Ages, right through to the modern church and the fight against the German occupation. Le Corbusier also sensed a sacred relationship of the hill with its surroundings – the Jura Mountains in the distance and the hill itself, dominating the landscape.

The nature of the site would result in an architectural ensemble that has many similarities with the Acropolis – starting from the ascent at the bottom of the hill to architectural and landscape events along the way, before finally terminating at the sanctus sanctorum itself – the chapel. Viisitors cannot see the building until they nearly reach the crest of the hill.

== Architecture ==
=== Structure ===
The structure is mostly concrete and is comparatively small, enclosed by thick walls, with the upturned roof supported on columns embedded within the walls, like a sail billowing in the wind on the hilltop. In the interior, the spaces left between the walls and roof are filled with clerestory windows, as well as the asymmetric light from the wall openings, serve to further reinforce the sacred nature of the space and reinforce the relationship of the building with its surroundings. The lighting in the interior is soft and indirect, from the clerestory windows and reflecting off the whitewashed walls of the chapels with projecting towers.

The structure is built mostly of concrete and stone, which was a remnant of the original chapel built on the hilltop site destroyed during World War II. Some have described Ronchamp as the first Post-Modern building, and others as the first building of the movement Expressionist architecture after World War II. It was constructed in the early 1950s.

The main part of the structure consists of two concrete membranes separated by a space of 6'11", forming a shell which constitutes the roof of the building. This roof, both insulating and watertight, is supported by short struts, which form part of a vertical surface of concrete covered with "gunite" and which, in addition, brace the walls of old Vosges stone provided by the former chapel which was destroyed by the bombings. These walls which are without buttresses follow, in plan, the curvilinear forms calculated to provide stability to this rough masonry. A space of several centimeters between the shell of the roof and the vertical envelope of the walls furnishes a significant entry for daylight. The floor of the chapel follows the natural slope of the hill down towards the altar. Certain parts, in particular those upon which the interior and exterior altars rest, are of beautiful white stone from Bourgogne, as are the altars themselves. The towers are constructed of stone masonry and are capped by cement domes. The vertical elements of the chapel are surfaced with mortar sprayed on with a cement gun and then white-washed — both on the interior and exterior. The concrete shell of the roof is left rough, just as it comes from the formwork. Watertightness is effected by a built-up roofing with an exterior cladding of aluminium. The interior walls are white; the ceiling grey; the bench of African wood created by Savina; the communion bench is of cast iron made by the foundries of the Lure.

=== The south wall ===
The South wall of Ronchamp is a creature of its own. Rather than designing a straight, 50 cm thick concrete piece, Le Corbusier spent months trying to perfect the outside wall. What he came up with is a wall that starts out as a point on the east end, and expands to up to 10 feet thick its west side. As it moves from east to west, it curves towards the south. To further expand his design's complexity, Le Corbusier decided to make the windows of the wall extraordinary. The openings slant towards their centers at varying degrees, thus letting in light at different angles. The different-sized windows are scattered in an irregular pattern across the wall. Le Corbusier reportedly insisted that the shapes and patterns were not arbitrary, but derived from a proportional system based on the Golden Section. Furthermore, the glass that closes the windows off is set at alternating depths. This glass is sometimes clear, but is often decorated with small pieces of stained glass in typical Corbusier colors: red, green, and yellow. These stained pieces radiate like rubies, emeralds, and amethysts, and act as the jewels of the already complex wall. After this extensive design, Le Corbusier decided not to make the southern partition a bearing wall. Instead, the building's roof is supported by concrete columns that make it appear to float above the rest of the space.

In a final move of symbolism, Le Corbusier filled the inside of the wall with the rubble from the previous chapel that stood at the location. Thus the old church, and all of its history, would remain in the site.

=== Furnishings ===
Small pieces of stained glass are set deep within the walls, which are sometimes ten feet thick. The glass glows likes deep-set rubies and emeralds and amethysts and jewels of all colors.

Because it is a pilgrimage chapel, there are few people worshipping at most times. But on special feast days, large crowds of thousands will attend. To accommodate them, Le Corbusier also built an outside altar and pulpit, so the large crowds can sit or stand on a vast field on the top of the hill. A famous statue of the Virgin Mary, rescued from the ruins of the chapel destroyed during WWII, is encased in a special glass case in the wall, and it can be turned to face inward when the congregation is inside, or to face outward toward the visitors.

=== Roof ===
The roof was built in two parts, utilizing two softly upward curving reinforced concrete membranes, with a space between for insulation. The sinusoidal curved ceiling was formed with wooden framework and then whitewashed. The linear, textured impression left from the timber framework emphasizes the lines of increasing curvature of the roof. Robin Evans believes that the ruled surface was integral to the roof design from the beginning, and may have been influenced by Antoine Pevsner's sculptures from welded metal rod, which Le Corbusier felt could be generalized as models for timber shuttering.

Much like the church at Sainte Marie de La Tourette, the roof of Notre Dame du Haut appears to float above the walls. This is possible, because it is supported by concrete columns, not the walls themselves. The effect produced allows a strip of light to enter the building, thus lighting the space further, and making the church feel more open.

This billowing concrete roof was planned to slope toward the back, where a fountain of abstract forms is placed on the ground. When it rains, the water comes pouring off the roof and down onto the raised, slanted concrete structures, creating a dramatic natural fountain.

== Addition ==
In 2006, the convent for the Clarisses, or Poor Clares, decided to construct a building next to the chapel. Le Corbusier himself had consulted with the Association de l’Œuvre Notre-Dame du Haut about adding a monastery, but concrete plans were never developed. Following the initiative of the abbess, Sister Brigitte de Singly, the Poor Clares commissioned Renzo Piano; the association had considered several architects besides Piano, including Tadao Ando, Glenn Murcutt, and Jean Nouvel. The project met great opposition when plans were unveiled in 2008. Architects like Richard Meier, Rafael Moneo, and Cesar Pelli signed an online petition denouncing the project. The French Ministry of Culture, which is required to approve plans for changing cultural landmarks, approved Piano's design.

In October 2011, Archbishop Luigi Ventura, the papal envoy to France, came to bless the convent. Immersed in the vegetation of the Bourlemont hill, the monastery is composed of twelve 120 square-feet domestic units for the sisters with spaces for common living (a refectory and workshops), an oratory for religious pilgrims, and a lodge to host visitors. The new visitors' centre, also dug into the hill, forms the base of the convent, thus replacing a 1960s gatehouse that had obscured sight of the chapel from the town below and was removed in the process of construction. The all-in budget of $13 million was realised through local government funding, charitable and religious donations, and the sale of the nuns' former convent in Besançon.

== Zhengzhou replica ==
In 1993, a large project began in Zhengzhou, China, to construct an entertainment district comprising replicas of notable Western buildings, with a Henan University lecturer as lead architect. A replica of Notre-Dame du Haut, retrospectively nicknamed "Ronchamp II", was completed but not occupied when the project ceased after the developer went bankrupt. In March 2001, a Taiwanese architect visiting a client in Zhengzhou chanced upon the replica and his photographs were soon published online. The Fondation Le Corbusier applied via the World Intellectual Property Organization to have the building demolished. It became a prominent symbol of wider Chinese trends of replica architecture (other examples include a replica Hallstatt and Thames Town). In 2006, with the site becoming a home for squatting mingong (migrant workers), the Zhengzhou government donated the land to the owner of a neighbouring property who agreed to demolish the building. China banned such replica architecture in 2020.

== See also ==
- Catholic (Dominican) Chapelle du Rosaire de Vence on the French Riviera, built and decorated under a plan devised by Henri Matisse, completed in 1951.
- "Non-denominational" Rothko Chapel in Houston, TX, which houses works by American painter Mark Rothko, who interacted with multiple architects to shape the design of the structure that opened in 1971.
- "Site of contemplation" Austin (building) in Austin, TX, conceived in 1986 by minimalist artist Ellsworth Kelly and carried out in 2018.
