= Citysocializer =

Social networking website

citysocializer
- Industry: Social media
- Founded: London, England; January 1, 2007
- Founder: Sanchita Saha
- Defunct: September 27, 2023
- Fate: Liquidation
- Headquarters: London, England, United Kingdom
- Area served: Worldwide
- Website: www.citysocializer.com

citysocializer (formerly known as CitySocialising) was a subscription-based social networking website based in London and serving the United Kingdom as a paid service and the United States as a free service. The website focused on what it calls "Online2Offline", providing users a place to connect through common interests and events which lead to meeting new people offline.

== History & company ==
citysocializer was founded in January 2007 by ex-BBC producer Sanchita Saha. The company was initially funded through with R&D support from The Prince's Trust. In 2009 the company raised £260,000 in investments through the London Business Angels group. These funds went towards city expansions, marketing and platform developments. By 2010 they had brought in £300,000 in revenue. In December 2010 citysocializer secured £1 million in a Series A round which was led by PROfounders Capital. This investment would be used for product development, expansion, and staff recruitment development and product management.

In August 2013 their first iPhone app was released and in July they announced they made a deal with OK! magazine and Gay Times.

The parent company entered liquidation in September 2023.

== Localism & membership ==
Unlike some social networking websites, citysocializer follows the same paradigm as services such as MeetUp and OkCupid, by focusing on "Online2Offline". The concept promotes common interests and local event that will allow users to meet new people offline. As of 2010, citysocializer reached 40 cities within the United Kingdom. The website hosts monthly group socials, hosted by community members, in order to drive local expansion. Events vary, but mostly revolve around drinking. The website is based around a user subscription model. It celebrates the full rollout of its new credits-based system across all platforms, making users pay to read messages or participate in socials. Citysocializer's premium service starts at £12.99 per month via the Web, or £3.99/week through an in-app purchase.

Membership demographics vary from ages 18 to 50. Members are described as recent graduates, recently relocated individuals, empty nesters or newly single.
