= James Tartaglia =

British philosopher and saxophonist

- Born: October 29, 1973 (age 52); Portsmouth, UK
- Education: University College London (BA, MPhil, PhD)
- Era: Contemporary
- Title: Professor of Metaphysical Philosophy
- Website: www.jamestartaglia.com

James Phillip Frank Tartaglia (born 29 October 1973) is a British philosopher who defends metaphysical idealism and existential nihilism, as well as a jazz saxophonist whose "jazz-philosophy fusion" combines jazz music with philosophical ideas.

== Biography ==
Tartaglia was born in Portsmouth, England, and grew up in Hereford, where he started playing alto saxophone at age 11 after hearing Cannonball Adderley's recording of "Another Kind of Soul". He was winner in the soloist category of the Daily Telegraph Young Jazz Competition in 1991 and successfully auditioned in Frankfurt for a scholarship to Berklee College of Music, Boston, where he studied from 1992 to 1993; his saxophone teacher was George Garzone. He began an economics degree at University College London in 1993, but soon switched to philosophy. He obtained a BA (1996), M.Phil. (1998) and Ph.D. (2001) in philosophy from UCL, where he studied with Tim Crane and J.J. Valberg. He was Visiting Lecturer at the University of Birmingham from 2001 to 2002 and then was appointed Lecturer in Philosophy at Keele University in 2002, where he stayed to become Professor of Metaphysical Philosophy in 2017; his inaugural lecture was a jazz-philosophy fusion performance entitled, “I’m Gonna Tell You the Meaning of Life”. He is an Associate Editor at the journal Human Affairs.

== Philosophy ==
Tartaglia argues that nihilism is an evaluatively neutral fact about reality; nihilism is not a negative state of affairs, as it is standardly assumed to be, nor a positive state of affairs, as per the 'Sunny Nihilism' defended by Wendy Syfret. When Tartaglia was questioned by Rowan Williams on BBC Radio 4's Moral Maze, Williams' line of questioning concerned the lack of moral guidance that his neutral nihilism offers. In response to a similar line of questioning from Rabbi Adam Jacobs, Tartaglia said the problem with using the meaning of life as a basis for moral judgements is that, "nobody's ever been able to agree on what it is." In a review of Philosophy in a Meaningless Life (2016) for Notre Dame Philosophical Reviews, Guy Bennett-Hunter is sympathetic to Tartaglia's idealist 'transcendent hypothesis' but not his nihilism, arguing that there are various 'unstated affinities' between Tartaglia's views and those of Karl Jaspars, and that Jaspars, like David E. Cooper, manages to avoid nihilism by appealing to ineffability. A book symposium on Philosophy in a Meaningless Life was published in 2017, featuring responses to the book from Philip Goff, Ronald A. Kuipers, Tracy Llanera, Alan Malachowski, Bjørn Torgrim Ramberg, Brooke Alan Trisel and J.J. Valberg, among others. In Philosophy in a Technological World: Gods and Titans (2020), which Raymond Tallis endorsed as 'a major work of philosophy by one of the UK's most original philosophers', Tartaglia focuses on metaphysical idealism, for which he provides five arguments: the first about why there is anything at all, the second about consciousness, the third about the distinction between abstract and concrete, the fourth about the philosophy of time and the fifth about human history. In a review in Philosophy Now, Kieran Brayford writes that the 'book is terse, lively, and enjoyable' and that he would 'especially recommend it to those who feel instinctively rankled by its idealist leanings. There is enough in the book to maybe change your mind.' In popular writings and lectures about idealism, Tartaglia has emphasized its near universality within world culture and its ability to preserve common sense intuitions.

== Jazz ==
A Free Jazz Treatise Concerning Current Affairs (2003) is an album of avant-garde jazz performed by two vocalists and a trio of tenor saxophone (Tartaglia), double bass and drums. It features five of Tartaglia's compositions that were inspired by news stories at the time: 'Paedophile Priest', 'Asylum Seeker', 'Economic Migrant', 'Peace Process' and 'Weapons of Mass Destruction'. In a review in Jazz Journal, Simon Adams wrote that, 'Treatise employs the musical language of Albert Ayler ... to explore some particularly difficult current issues. [...] This approach works extraordinarily well, the pieces - all first takes - mixing expressive solo tenor lines and childlike, often wordless singing over marching beats ... Not an easy listen, as if its subject matter would allow that, but certainly a hugely rewarding one.' Dark Metaphysic (2008) features a 'Free Funk Assembly' of two vocalists and six instrumentalists, including British jazz luminaries Annie Whitehead (trombone) and Jennifer Maidman (bass guitar). In a review for All About Jazz, Jeff Dayton-Johnson writes that the 'philosophical references accumulate pretty fast and furious—there's a piece dedicated to conceptual artist Bruce Nauman, who once dedicated a quizzical square of aluminum to John Coltrane (his John Coltrane Piece, 1969), as well as a song about Hermes Trismegistus, a mysterious combination of Hermes (Greek) and Thoth (Egyptian) who figures prominently in the philosophical systems of Anthony Braxton and Sun Ra'. Whitehead and Maidman also feature on Kooky Steps (2014), which includes a performance entitled 'Schopenhauer's Blues' in which University of Bristol philosopher Dagmar Wilhelm reads from the works of Schopenhauer as if she were tormenting vocalist Sonja Morgenstein with the cosmic pessimism being expressed; Tartaglia explains the concepts behind this performance in his article, 'Jazz-Philosophy Fusion'.

== Books ==
=== Authored books ===
- Inner Space Philosophy (Winchester, UK: Iff Books 2024)
- (with Tracy Llanera) A Defence of Nihilism (London: Routledge 2021)
- Philosophy in a Technological World: Gods and Titans (London: Bloomsbury 2020)
- Philosophy in a Meaningless Life (London: Bloomsbury 2016)
- Rorty and the Mirror of Nature (London: Routledge 2007)

=== Edited books ===
- (with Stephen Leach) The Meaning of Life and the Great Philosophers (London: Routledge 2018)
- Nihilism and the Meaning of Life: A Philosophical Dialogue with James Tartaglia, edited by Masahiro Morioka (Saitama, Japan: University of Waseda 2017)
- (with Stephen Leach) Consciousness and the Great Philosophers (London: Routledge 2016)
- (with Stephen Leach) Richard Rorty’s Mind, Language, and Metaphilosophy: Early Philosophical Papers (Cambridge: Cambridge University Press 2014)
- Richard Rorty: Critical Assessments of Leading Philosophers, 4 volumes (London: Routledge 2009)

== Discography ==
- Look For Work, 2021 – with Steve Tromans (piano)
- Jazz-Philosophy Fusion, 2016 – with Jessica Radcliffe (vocals), Sonja Morgenstern (vocals), Steve Tromans (piano), David Hilton (bass guitar), Tymoteusz Jozwiak (drums), Gareth Fowler (guitar)
- Kooky Steps, 2014 – with Mark Huggett (drums), Jennifer Maidman (bass), Annie Whitehead (trombone), Thomas Seminar Ford (guitar), Sonja Morgenstern (vocals), Dagmar Wilhelm (vocals)
- Dark Metaphysic, 2008 – with Mark Huggett (drums), Jennifer Maidman (bass guitar), Annie Whitehead (trombone), Ben Thomas (trumpet), Matt Ratcliffe (keyboard), Sonja Morgenstern (vocals), Lizzi Wood (vocals)
- A Free Jazz Treatise Concerning Current Affairs, 2003 - with Mark Huggett (drums), Nick Haward (double bass), Sonja Morgenstern (vocals), Lizzi Wood (vocals)
