= Herbivore men =

Japanese term for men with little interest in getting married or finding a girlfriend

Herbivore men (Japanese: 草食系, Hepburn: sōshoku-kei) is a term used in Japan to describe young men who become voluntarily celibate and express little interest in getting married or being assertive in pursuing relationships with women. The term was coined by the author Maki Fukasawa, who initially intended for it to describe a new form of masculinity that was not reliant on the proactivity and assertiveness typically associated with masculinity in Japan. Philosopher Masahiro Morioka defines herbivore men as "kind and gentle men who, without being bound by manliness, do not pursue romantic relationships voraciously and have no aptitude for being hurt or hurting others." According to Fukasawa, herbivore men are "not without romantic relationships, but have a non-assertive, indifferent attitude toward desires of flesh".

The term was quickly sensationalized by the media, gaining a negative connotation suggesting young men who had lost their "manliness" were responsible for Japan's declining birth rate and stagnating economy. Through mass media, the label of herbivore man came to be associated with irresponsible, overly feminine men who cared too much about their appearance rather than marriage or finding a stable job, which were seen as traditionally masculine roles. The definition of herbivore men is still debated because of this, making it difficult to estimate how many men in Japan identify as herbivore men, particularly considering the social stigma associated with the term.

The opposite term is carnivorous women (肉食系の女性, Nikushoku-kei no josei), denoting more sexually proactive and assertive women who are often considered maneaters with baby fever.

== Definition and prevalence ==
Although the term "herbivore man" does not have a universally accepted definition, there are a few defining characteristics for herbivore men that seem widely agreed upon. This is largely because the traits associated with herbivore men are defined by popular culture and media rather than through academic fields, as demonstrated in the contrast between the perspective on masculinity that Maki Fukusawa intended to convey in coining the term compared to its current connotation.

Since the boundaries for what defines herbivore men are unclear, popularly cited surveys such as the one conducted by LifeNet concluded that in a sample group of 1000 unmarried men and women in their 20s and 30s, 378 men reported that they considered themselves "herbivorous." However, the survey asked participants to choose between whether they considered themselves carnivorous or herbivorous, with 45.9% of respondents clarifying that while they would not explicitly define themselves as herbivorous, they preferred it in comparison to carnivorous. Additionally, LifeNet's definition for "herbivorous" was based on two defining aspects: a general passivity about love and a preference to keep to themselves even if they have something to say.

== History ==
Masahiro Morioka argues that Japanese herbivore men are a result of Japan's post-war peace. Since the end of World War II, Japan has not directly participated in any war or conflict, either within its own borders or outside of them. Prior to this time of peace, many Japanese felt that becoming a soldier was the only approach to becoming manly. This social norm has slowly disappeared during the following period of post-war peace. Due to this, Japanese men are less aggressive and this could bleed over into their romantic lives.

== Social stigma ==
=== In mass media ===
Mass media's discouragement of the lifestyle and expressive practices associated with herbivore men has caused the term to become interchangeable with conceptions of weak men that provide little or no contributions to Japan's economic structures. Freeters, or young men working exclusively part-time jobs, are one such conception of weak men that the term herbivore men has become synonymous with.

Depictions of herbivore men in the mass media typically arise out of economic concerns. Japan's stagnating economy following the burst of the 1980s economic bubble destabilized its labor market structured around salarymen, or white-collar workers with a permanent salaried job. In turn, essentialist narratives of a masculine ideal—the married, family-oriented salaryman—that exist in relation to Japan's economic and labor structures were put to question, and became less appealing to younger generations. Many youths rejected this employment path, and as of 2007, approximately 920,000 men were freeters, many of whom also found it difficult to marry because of the strong relation between work and marriage in Japan. The view of freeters as men who lack ambition and are irresponsible and un-masculine match many of the characteristics associated with herbivore men, with both groups often interchangeably used as scapegoats for Japan's economic decline. Furthermore, after the term was coined in 2006 and took on a wider use in mass media and popular culture, nationalist groups targeted the emergence of herbivore men as an economic threat amid the 2008 recession.

=== Marriage ===
Indifference to marriage and committed relationships has been an observable trend in many socially and economically advanced societies. Japanese women's values in romantic or long-term relationships tend to avoid characteristics of herbivore men that are associated with weakness and unproductiveness. Many women refuse to marry men who do not have steady jobs since a stable employment is seen as a sign of maturity and masculinity, and a man's ability to financially provide for a family unit. Other women feel that self-proclaimed herbivore men are weak and not masculine, while some men apparently are not attracted to "independent" women. In a 2011 poll of Japanese boys aged between 16 and 19, 36% described themselves as indifferent or averse towards having sex; the figure for girls in the same age group was at 59%.

== Potential effects ==
Population projections for Japan (National Institute of Population and Social Security Research, 2023)

Japan recorded a sub-replacement fertility rate of only 1.42 total fertility in 2014, down from a high of 1.84 in the mid-1980s. Many blame this drastic fall on the rise of herbivore men in Japan. The decline in birth rate has been attributed to the herbivore men's reluctance to marry.

Japan's population has been in decline since 2011. In 2014, Japan's population was estimated at 127 million; this figure is expected to shrink to 107 million (16%) by 2040 and to 97 million (24%) by 2050 should the current demographic trend continue.

== In culture and media ==
With the perceived rise of herbivore men in Japanese society, herbivore men have also become more prominent in Japanese culture and media. From 2008 to 2009, the term herbivore men became a widely used and trendy term in Japan. It even was voted into the top ten of Buzzwords of the Year in December 2009 by U-CAN. Sōshoku-kei danshi (Herbivore Men) was a movie released in 2010 in which one of the main characters displays herbivore tendencies. Throughout the movie, he struggles to understand sexual situations, such as a woman inviting him to sleep with her. In the same year, singer-songwriter Gackt held a male-only rock concert in an attempt to bolster "men's spirit ... and sexuality" against the herbivore men masculinity in Japan's society.

The Single Lady (お一人様, Ohitorisama) was a TV drama broadcast in 2009, focusing on the relationship between an herbivore man and his coworker who end up sharing an apartment. Shinichi, the herbivore man, is portrayed as the exact opposite of a traditional "masculine" man, lacking ambition at work, relationship experience and intention of pursuing a relationship that is associated with masculinity. The drama was relatively popular and had an audience rating of 9.45%.

=== In popular culture ===
Contrary to the rhetoric seen in mass media, characteristics associated with herbivore men have appeared positively in popular culture and entertainment alongside terms such as bishōnen, an aesthetic and art style that represents a youthful, androgynous, and gentle form of masculinity. Consumers of popular media with herbivorous men have deemed this subversive and nonassertive image of masculinity in its commercialized form as trendy, attractive, and desirable.

==== J-pop ====
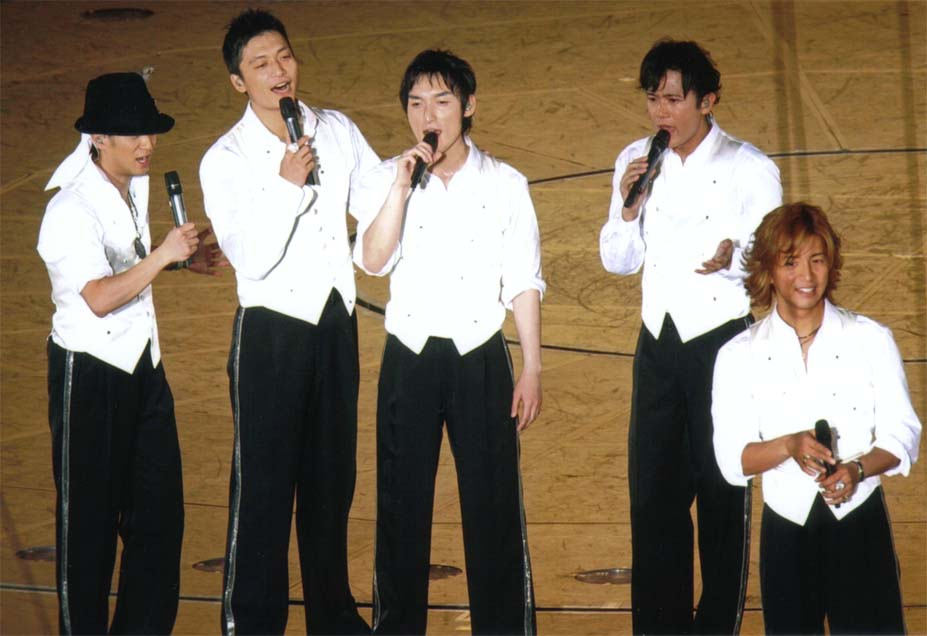
SMAP performing during their 2008 Super Modern Artistic Performance Tour

J-pop is an area of popular media and entertainment within which defining characteristics of herbivore men are especially prevalent. Idols who are popular among younger audiences and adhere to a boy band format tend to gain traction in popular culture when they present as boyish and youthful as opposed to manly and conventionally masculine, or when they perform behaviors and looks considered feminine. Kam Louie references the former J-pop boy band SMAP, specifically band member Tsuyoshi Kusanagi, as Japanese idols whose gentle demeanors and soft, androgynous visuals contributed to their popularity. Despite mass media's rendering of herbivore men as individuals whose passivity burdens Japanese society, SMAP, among other bands, have played active roles in international relations and trends in globalization. In some cases, their herbivorous masculinity has been used alongside their music to maintain favorable relationships between both Asian and non-Asian countries.

==== Connections to larger popular culture phenomena ====
Some academics have pointed toward a potential link between the popular appeal of herbivore men among younger women and other forms of media intended for women, such as the boys' love (BL) and yaoi genres. Similarities exist between the androgynous, nationality-defying elements of herbivore men in popular media, and tropes solidified by pioneering yaoi creators, namely depictions of androgynous men in highly aestheticized European-style environments that detach the work from its place of creation.

== See also ==
- 4B movement
- Alpha and beta male
- Asexuality and aromanticism
- Bachelor
- Buddha-like mindset
- Danshi
- Freeter
- Hikikomori
- Incel
- Men Going Their Own Way
- Nice guy
- NEET
- Parasite single
- Quiet quitting
- Satori generation
- Soy boy
