= High Hat (Boy George album) =

Compilation album by Boy George
- Released: March 1989 (US)
- Recorded: 1988
- Genre: Pop-soul; new jack swing
- Length: 51:32
- Label: Virgin
- Producer: Gene Griffin; Bobby Z.; Mike Pela; Boy George

Boy George chronology
Boyfriend (1988)	High Hat (1989)	The Martyr Mantras (1991)

High Hat is a 1989 album compiling tracks from Boy George's second and third UK and European solo albums, Tense Nervous Headache and Boyfriend.

== Production and release ==
Since neither Tense Nervous Headache or Boyfriend are any longer available, High Hat remains the only place to find any of Boy George's songs from 1988 to 1989. While High Hat has only ten tracks, the two other albums together included eighteen tracks: nine on the vinyl and twelve on the CD and cassette for Tense Nervous Headache; plus eight for Boyfriend, one of which (the hi-energy remix of "No Clause 28", also known as "Pascal Gabriel Mix") would later re-surface on Jesus Loves You's The Martyr Mantras album.

Tense Nervous Headache was shelved in the UK shortly after release of the first single due to lack of interest (or, as George put it in his autobiography, after it "died a solitary death"), despite the singer getting to No. 1 in the UK Singles Chart the previous year with "Everything I Own". Half of the ten tracks on High Hat were quite unsuccessful singles either taken from Tense Nervous Headache or Boyfriend: "Don't Cry", "Whisper", "Don't Take My Mind on a Trip", "You Found Another Guy" and "Whether They Like It or Not".

The only track actually taken from High Hat as an independent single in the United States was the US remix of the opener "Don't Take My Mind on a Trip"; the version of which included on High Hat is slightly different from that originally opening Boyfriend. "Don't Take My Mind on a Trip" was a club hit in Canada and the US, charting at No. 5 on the Billboard R&B charts. "You Found Another Guy" reached number 31 on the Billboard Hot Black Singles Sales Chart on the 5th of August, 1989. A third single, "Whisper", was also released in the US in September 1989 and Boy George performed it live on the Arsenio Hall Show on September the 25th of that year. High Hat nonetheless did a little better than its US predecessor Sold, reaching number 126 on the Billboard charts on the 6th of May, 1989. It was also released in Australia (V2555) and Mexico (LEMP-1640).

== Critical reception ==
Professional ratings
Review scores
Source	Rating
AllMusic	2/5 stars

William Ruhlmann from AllMusic gave the album three out of five stars and wrote that while Boy George was in the band Culture Club, together they "scored surprising across-the-board success with a wild new fashion sense and old-fashioned pop-soul music", but "as a solo artist [he] seems determined to address a much smaller, more targeted audience". According to Ruhlmann, in the majority songs on the album, George "wants to engage in thinly veiled confessions set to new jack swing percussion tracks into which he nearly disappears".

== Track listing ==
1. "Don't Take My Mind on a Trip" (US Remix) – 5:21 (Griffin)
2. "Whisper" – 5:40 (O'Dowd, Maidman, Bobby Z)
3. "Whether They Like It or Not" – 5:10 (Griffin, O'Dowd, Bell)
4. "You Found Another Guy" – 4:27 (Griffin, Bell, Middleton)
5. "You Are My Heroin" – 6:21 (O'Dowd, Maidman, Nightingale, Stevens, Fletcher)
6. "I'm Not Sleeping Anymore" – 4:20 (Griffin, O'Dowd)
7. "Kipsy" – 6:06 (O'Dowd, Nightingale, Dewar, Geary)
8. "Don't Cry" (single version) – 4:09 (O'Dowd, Maidman, Bobby Z)
9. "Girl with Combination Skin" – 6:00 (O'Dowd, Fletcher, Maidman, Nightingale)
10. "Something Strange Called Love" (edit) – 3:59 (O'Dowd, Vincent, Dewar)

== Personnel ==
Tracks 2, 5, 7–10

- Boy George – lead vocals, co-production (tracks: 7, 10)
- Glenn Nightingale – guitars and other voices
- Ian Maidman – bass, keyboards
- Bobby Z. – drums, production on (tracks: 2, 5, 8, 9)
- Amanda Vincent – keyboards
- Vic Martin – keyboards
- Richie Stevens – drums ("Kipsy")
- Derek Green – other voices
- Carroll Thompson – other voices
- Helen Terry – other voices
- Beverley Skeete – other voices
- Belva Haney – other voices
- Wendell Morrison Jr. – other voices
- Juliet Roberts, Nevada Cato – other voices
- David Ulm, Carol Steel – percussion
- Jagdeep Singh – tabla and other voices
- Simon Tyrrel – drum programming
- Andy Dewar – drum programming
- Anne Dudley – all string arrangements
- Kenny Wellington – brass section
- David "Baps" Baptiste – brass section
- Nat Augustin – brass section
- Sid Gauld – brass section
- Ed Jones – major saxophone
- Desmond Foster – other bass
- MC Kinky (Caron Geary) – toasting ("Kipsy")
- Paul Lee – choir ("Mama Never Knew")
- Iris Sutherland – choir ("Mama Never Knew")
- Yvonne White – choir ("Mama Never Knew")
- Jock Loveband – engineer
- Alan Douglas – engineer
- Martin White – engineer
- Terry Reed – engineer
- Paul Wright – engineer
- Renny Hill – engineer
- Phil Legg – engineer
- Robin Evans – engineer
- Mike Pela – mixing (tracks: 2, 5, 8, 9), co-production on (tracks: 7, 10)

Tracks 1, 3, 4, 6

- Boy George – lead vocals
- Lee Drakeford – backing vocals
- Zan – backing vocals
- Marsha McClurkin – backing vocals
- Mauricette Martin – backing vocals
- Teddy Riley – all instruments, backing vocals, arrangements
- Bernard Belle – acoustic guitar & backing vocals
- Dennis Mitchell – engineer
- Bill Esses – assistant engineer
- Gene Griffin – production

== Charts ==
Chart (1989)	Peak position
Australian Albums (ARIA)	126
US Billboard 200	126
US Top R&B/Hip-Hop Albums (Billboard)	34
