= Jennifer Maidman =

British musician, singer, producer, songwriter, actor, and author

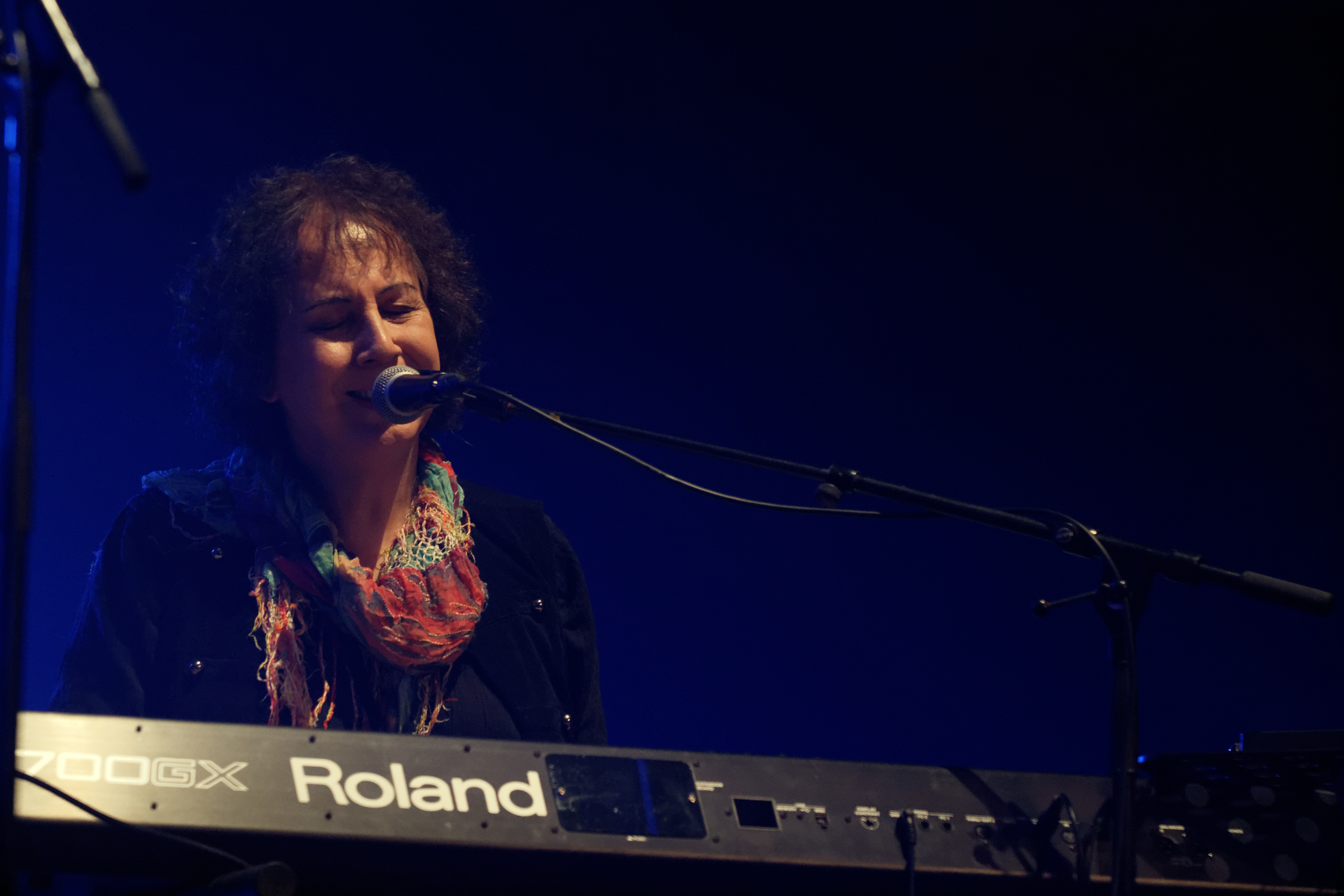
- Maidman performing live, 2013

Background information
- Born: 24 January 1958 (age 68)
- Origin: Upminster, England
- Occupations: Musician, composer, producer, singer, actress, author and editor
- Instruments: Bass guitar, guitar, piano, drums
- Years active: 1974–present
- Labels: Earthmusic, Phongram, London, Zopf
- Website: jennifermaidman.com

Jennifer Maidman (formerly Ian Maidman, born 24 January 1958) is a British musician, singer, producer, songwriter, and author who has collaborated extensively with many internationally well known groups and artists. Her work appears on hundreds of recordings from 1976 onwards and she has received numerous awards, including a platinum award from the British Phonographic Industry (BPI) for the album 'Hormonally Yours', on which she worked as part of the band Shakespears Sister. She was a core member of the Penguin Cafe Orchestra from 1984 until 2007. She is best known as a bass guitarist but also sings and plays guitar, keyboards, drums, percussion, ukulele, cuatro and Chapman Stick. In June 2016, her website announced that she was working on a solo album in Woodstock, New York featuring amongst others, Jerry Marotta (ex Peter Gabriel), Annie Whitehead, and David Torn. The album, entitled 'Dreamland' was released on 1 August 2017 and features Marotta, Torn and Whitehead, with guest contributions from Paul Brady and Robert Wyatt amongst others. Since 2017, she has also been collaborating frequently with New York-based arts cooperative The Secret City. In 2021, she reunited with Joan Armatrading for a live stream concert at the Asylum Chapel in London. In 2022, the concert was broadcast in the UK by the BBC and released as a double album on CD and streaming services.

== Career ==
=== Early years ===
Maidman's first release was L-L-Lazy Days in 1976, as a writer member of the group Red Hot, signed to Phillips/Phonogram, and produced by Mutt Lange. In the late seventies Maidman also trained as a recording engineer, sometimes assisting John Burns at Escape Studios and notably recording and mixing Marc Bolan's 1976 hit single 'I Love to Boogie' at Decibel Studio, a track later featured in the film 'Billy Elliot'.

=== Recording and production ===
Maidman's work as a musician, producer or writer, has since featured on hundreds of recordings, working with artists including Joan Armatrading, David Sylvian, The Penguin Cafe Orchestra, Ian Dury, Shakespears Sister, The Proclaimers, Paul Brady, Sam Brown, Gerry Rafferty, Annie Whitehead, Robert Wyatt, Sniff 'n the Tears, Loudon Wainwright, and Murray Head amongst others.

Notable successes include the Shakespears Sister double platinum album Hormonally Yours, (which spawned the single "Stay", number one in several countries and certified gold in the US), The Proclaimers' Letter from America (certified gold), and producing Paul Brady's Back to the Centre (featuring Eric Clapton, and voted best Irish album of the year by the readers of Hot Press) and the follow-up Primitive Dance (featuring Mark Knopfler). She co-wrote, arranged and recorded a number of songs with Boy George and Bobby Z (of Prince and the Revolution), which appeared on the albums Tense Nervous Headache and High Hat and went on to work again with Z on the album Gobe by French artist Guesch Patti, on which she arranged and played all instruments. Maidman has also written for Sam Brown, Eurovision entrants Bardo, and Murray Head.

She has written and worked extensively with her partner, the English trombonist Annie Whitehead and produced and played on her albums Naked, Home and The Gathering. She produced two albums by the Irish singer songwriter Paul Brady, Back to the Centre and Primitive Dance (and appears on many others), produced and performed on tracks on Linda McCartney's solo album Wide Prairie, and has also produced Murray Head, Dutch African band Pili Pili, The Kick Horns, Northern Lights, and Lund.

Other notable appearances on record include When in Rome, Union Cafe and Concert Program with Penguin Cafe Orchestra, extensive contributions to Gerry Rafferty's sixth album North and South, Christie Hennessey's platinum selling album This is As Far As I Go, David Sylvian's Gone to Earth, Paul Brady's Full Moon, Oh What a World and Hooba Dooba, Sam Brown's Stop and April Moon albums, and many releases by Murray Head from 1984 until the present. Her distinctive fretless bass playing can be heard on a number of recordings, notably Taking the Veil and Silver Moon by David Sylvian, Heaven and Frustration by Joan Armatrading, The Awakening by Paul Brady, and Peril in Venice by Murray Head. Jennifer contributed guitar and accordion on Robert Wyatt's album Cuckooland, nominated for the 2004 Mercury Music prize.

In 2015 The Vicar Street Sessions Volume One was released, on which Jennifer (on guitar and bass) accompanies Paul Brady, Van Morrison, Mark Knopfler, Bonnie Raitt and Ronan Keating amongst others.

=== Live performance ===
Maidman has performed throughout Europe, the UK, Ireland, the US, Canada, Australia and New Zealand, appearing live with amongst others Joan Armatrading, Paul Brady, David Sylvian, Penguin Cafe Orchestra, Murray Head, Bonnie Raitt, Terry Reid, Elvis Costello, Van Morrison, Curtis Stigers, Boy George, Tony O'Malley and Kokomo. Major live performance tours include Joan Armatrading band's 'The Key', a six-month tour which visited major venues in the UK, US, Canada, Europe, New Zealand and Australia, and, following on from her contributions to the critically acclaimed album 'Gone to Earth', an 'eighty day world tour' entitled 'In Praise of Shamans' with David Sylvian, Mark Isham and David Torn. Maidman's performance on multiple instruments can be heard throughout the definitive recording of the first incarnation of Penguin Cafe Orchestra, the album 'When in Rome', a recording of a live performance by the band at London's Royal Festival Hall. She toured extensively with the band throughout the world and played a key role in their reunion/farewell concerts in 2007, when the band played three sold out nights at London's Union Chapel and received a five star review from the Guardian.

=== Television and film ===
Major television appearances include a South Bank Show documentary as a member of the Penguin Cafe Orchestra, a six-part RTE series on Paul Brady, and a BBC4 documentary on Robert Wyatt, in which Jennifer appeared alongside Robert on lead vocals, guitar and accordion. She played drums with Salif Keita and the Penguin Cafe Orchestra in Kevin Godley's 'One World One Voice', a global musical chain letter featuring Sting, Lou Reed, Laurie Anderson and many other musicians from around the world. The project became a BBC TV special, a documentary and an album. Jennifer provided music for the soundtrack to the film 'All the Little Animals' (1998), starring John Hurt and Christian Bale.

=== Recent projects ===
Maidman sings lead vocal and plays guitar in SoupSongs, a project devoted to Robert Wyatt's music, put together by Wyatt and Annie Whitehead. Soupsongs have released a critically acclaimed live double album, and performed at London's Royal Festival Hall, Queen Elizabeth Hall, at many other UK venues, and in France, Germany and Italy. Writing in the Guardian, the music critic John Fordham praised the album and said that "Maidman catches the composer's sense of dishevelled dignity and casually poetic radicalism".

Maidman also performs regularly with the Orchestra That Fell to Earth (five members of the original Penguin Cafe Orchestra, including Geoffrey Richardson), plays regularly in France with Murray Head, and with Kokomo, Terry Reid and Annie Whitehead.

She has also appeared at a number of performance poetry events with the beat poet Michael Horovitz, and with Penny Rimbeau's Last Amendment, including a concert at the National Cite' de la Musique Museum's auditorium in Paris. Jennifer also collaborated with James Tartaglia (Saxophonist and Professor of Philosophy at Keele University) on albums influenced by Tartaglia's philosophy work, 'Dark Metaphysic' (2008) and 'Kooky Steps' (2014).

In 2020 Maidman's track 'Psycho Loco', a collaboration with lyricist Verna Gillis, won the Independent Music Award in the Funk Fusion category.

In November 2020 Maidman released a single 'All In', a vocal duet with Senegalese star Youssou N'Dour recorded during the covid lockdown. The Afropop website described the track as a "soaring anthem of solidarity".

=== Theatre work ===
Maidman's first theatre appearances were with James Cooper's Renegades company in East London. She has subsequently appeared on stage in London, featuring in 'Strange Cargo', a devised piece directed by Jamie Beddard and Claire Hodgson for Diverse City, and on the New York stage in Chris Wells' "It Will All Work Out' at Dixon Place, Mannhatan, in 2017. In January 2019 Maidman appeared in Leah Coloff's musical theatre piece This Tree, which premiered at the Prototype Festival in New York City.

== Discography ==
As Jennifer Maidman (solo artist):

- 'Dreamland' 2017
- 'Psycho Loco' (co-write with Verna Gillis) 2019
- 'Paradiggum Shift' (featuring Verna Gillis) 2020
- 'All In- On Y Va Yous' (featuring Youssou N'Dour) 2021

With Alice:

- 'Ill Sole Nella Pioggia' 1989 (Italy)

With Joan Armatrading:

- 'Track Record' 1983
- 'Live at the Asylum Chapel' 2022

Single:

- 'Heaven' 1983

With Jan Allain:

- 'A Kind of Glory' 2000
- 'Freedom's Daughter' 2014

With Bardo:

- 'Hang on to Your Heart' 1983

With Paul Brady:

- 'Back to the Centre' 1985 (producer, also featuring Eric Clapton) Hot Press album of the year, Ireland.
- 'Full Moon' (Live) 1986
- 'Primitive Dance' 1987 (producer, also featuring Mark Knopfler)
- 'Songs and Crazy Dreams' 1992
- 'Nobody Knows' 1999
- 'Oh What a World' 2000
- 'The Paul Brady Songbook' 2002 (music from the six-part RTE TV series)
- 'Hooba Dooba' 2010
- 'Dancer in the Fire' 2012
- 'Maybe So' 2022

Singles:

- 'Deep in your Heart' 1985 (producer)
- 'The Island' 1985 (producer)
- 'Eat the Peach' 1987 (producer)

With Paul Brady, Van Morrison, Bonnie Raitt, Mark Knopfler, Ronan Keating

- 'The Vicar Street Sessions' 2015

With Sam Brown:

- 'Stop' 1988 (UK certified Gold)
- 'Can I get a witness?' 1988 (single)
- 'April Moon' 1990 (co-writer, UK certified Silver)
- 'The A&M Years' 2016

With Vicki Brown:

- 'About Love and Life' 1990

With Stan Campbell:

- 'Stan Campbell' 1987
- 'Years Go By' (Single) 1987

With Boy George:

- 'Sold' 1986 Virgin (UK certified Silver)
- 'Tense Nervous Headache' 1988 Virgin (co-writer)
- 'High Hat' 1989 Virgin (co-writer)
- 'This Is What I Do' 2013 Very Me Records

Singles:

- 'Everything I Own' 1987
- 'Sold' 1987
- 'Keep Me in Mind' 1987
- 'Don't Cry' 1988 (co-writer)
- 'Whisper' 1988 (co-writer)
- 'No Clause 28' 1988 (co-writer)

With Maryen Cairns:

- 'Femina Australis' 2016
- 'Anew' 2022

With Judy Cheeks:

- 'No Outsiders' 1988

With Crazy House:

- 'Still looking for Heaven on Earth' 1987

With Chris De Burgh:

- 'A Better World' 2016
- 'The Legend of Robin Hood' 2021
- '50' 2024

With Ian Dury and Mitt Gamon:

- 'A Poor Life' (co writer/producer)

With Murray Head:

- 'Restless' 1985
- 'Wave' 1992
- 'Innocence' 1993
- 'Pipe Dreams' 1995 (co-writer/producer)
- 'When You're in Love' 1995
- 'Passion' 2002
- 'Emotions- My Favourite Songs' 2005
- 'Tete a Tete' 2007
- 'Rien n'est Ecrit' 2008
- 'Live Collection' 2009
- 'My Back Pages' 2012
- 'Say It Ain't So (Live!)' 2023
- 'Nigel Live(d)+' 2026

With Christie Hennessy:

- 'This is as Far as I Go' 1999 (certified double platinum Ireland)

With Hue and Cry:

- 'I Refuse' 1986

With Jazz Monk:

- 'Afro Cortex' 2004

With JC001

- 'Ride the Break' 1993

With Lorraine Jordan:

- 'A Light Over There' 2007

With Shona Laing:

- 'New on Earth' 1992

With Jim Leverton and Geoffrey Richardson:

- 'Follow Your Heart' 1995 (producer)

With Lies Damn Lies:

- 'Love Among the Ruins' 1992

With Little Bob Story:

- 'Off the Rails' 1977 (credited as Ian Madman)

With Lund:

- 'Flawed Heroine' 2015 (producer)

With Marco Machera:

- 'Dime Novels' 2014

With Eleanor McEvoy:

- 'Gimme Some Wine' 2021

With Linda McCartney:

- 'Wide Prairie' 1998 (producer)

With Loz Netto:

- 'Loz Netto's Bzar' 1982

With Northern Lights:

- 'Airplay' 2002 (producer)

With Guesch Patti:

- 'Gobe' 1992

As member of Penguin Cafe Orchestra:

- 'When in Rome' (Live at the Royal Festival Hall) 1987
- 'Union Cafe' 1993
- 'Concert Program' 1995
- 'Piano Music' 2000
- 'History' 2001
- 'Brief History' 2001
- 'The Second Penguin Cafe Orchestra Sampler' 2004

With Penguin Cafe Orchestra/Salif Keita/Lou Reed/Kevin Godley

- 'One World One Voice' 1990

With Pili Pili:

- 'Boogaloo' 1993 (producer)

With The Proclaimers:

- 'This is the Story' 1988 (UK certified Gold)

Singles:

- 'Letter From America' (UK certified Silver)
- 'Make My Heart Fly'

With Gerry Rafferty:

- 'North and South' 1988
- 'One More Dream' 1996 (UK certified Gold)

With Red Hot:

- 'L-l-Lazy Days' 1976

With Penny Rimbeau:

- 'Oh Magick Kingdom' 2011

With Penny Rimbeau Academie des Vanities/Crass

- 'Yes Sir, the Truth of Revolution' 2016

With Rude:

- 'This is Rude' 1994

With Phil Saatchi:

- 'Stripped' 1986

With Shakespears Sister:

- 'Hormonally Yours' 1992 (UK certified double platinum)

Singles:

- 'Stay' 1992 (No 1 UK, Ireland and Sweden certified Gold USA and UK)

With Sniff 'n the Tears/Paul Roberts:

- 'City Without Walls' 1985
- 'Kettle Drum Blues' 1987
- 'Downstream' 2011

With Soupsongs (The music of Robert Wyatt):

- Soupsongs 2001

With Lisbee Stainton:

- 'Sidekick' (Single) 2012
- 'Go' (album) 2012

With David Sylvian:

- 'Gone to Earth' 1986
- 'Weatherbox' 1990
- 'A Victim of Stars' 2012

Unofficial releases:

- 'Live in Theatre'
- 'In Praise of Shamans'

Singles:

- 'Taking the Veil'
- 'Silver Moon'

With James Tartaglia:

- 'Dark Metaphysic' 2008
- 'Kooky Steps' 2014

With T.Rex/Marc Bolan:

- 'Dandy in the Underworld' 1977 (engineer)

Singles:

- 'I Love to Boogie' 1976
- 'Laser Love' 1976

Various artists:

- 'All the Little Animals (soundtrack)' 1998

With Vitamin Z:

- 'Sharp Stone Rain' 1989

With Loudon Wainwright III:

- 'Therapy' 1989

With Well Red:

- 'Motion' 1987

With Annie Whitehead:

- 'Naked' 1992 (co writer/producer)
- 'Home' 1994 (co-writer/producer)
- 'The Gathering 1997' (co-writer/producer)

With Robert Wyatt:

- 'Cuckooland' 2003 (Nominated for the Mercury prize 2004)

== Writing on humanistic psychology and therapy ==
Maidman is also a trained therapist and member of the British Association for Counselling and Psychotherapy who has written on the subject of Humanistic Psychology for professional journals, and contributed chapters to, and edited (with Dr Richard House and David Kalisch) "The Future of Humanistic Psychology", described by Professor Arthur Bohart of California State University as "a profoundly important book". On 21 August 2017 publisher Routledge released 'Humanistic Psychology: current trends and future prospects' in the US and UK. Maidman again contributed chapters and co-edited the book with Dr Richard House and David Kalisch.

== Personal life ==
According to an interview published in 2015, Maidman had gender reassignment around 2000, after a long period of transition, changing her first name to Jennifer.
