= Europe Street =

Type of shopping area in China

Chinese name
- Chinese: 欧洲风情街
Transcriptions
Standard Mandarin
- Hanyu Pinyin: Ōuzhōu Fēngqíng Jiē

French name
- French: rue de l'Europe

Spanish name
- Spanish: calle de Europa

A Europe Street (Chinese: 欧洲风情街; pinyin: Ōuzhōu Fēngqíng Jiē, also Little Europe or Europetown) is a type of shopping area in China where European culture is on display.

Examples include:

- Chengdu's Tongzilin (桐梓林) neighborhood While officially called "Tongzilin European Culture Street", a source claims that Chengdu's Tongzilin European Culture Street is "... is in European style with European architecture, pools, and porches. Road signs of this street are written in four languages: Chinese, English, Japanese and Korean."
- Yancheng as of July 2010
- Hefei, called the "Hefei Economic and Technological Development Zone", which is north of Pearl Plaza, is a "... creative mix of European streetscape, merged into a distinctive European style buildings."
- Huai'an, known as "Huai'an Square" is a "key municipal project" that is "... located in Huaian Huaihai Road No. 65." The place is described as a "... European and American classic fashion apparel and merchandise with the characteristics of leisure travel."
- Shenzhen's "Europe Town Shenzhen", which is located in the Nanshan district.
- Luodian, Shanghai, is known as the "North European New Town"

Beijing had a two-day festival in 2005 named "Europe Street", located in Firework Square near Chaoyang Park. It was organised by a delegation from the European Commission of the European Union, celebrating the 30th anniversary of EU-China diplomatic relations. The event had music and street theatre performances drawn from many EU countries.

== See also ==
- Jackson Hole, China
- Thames Town
- Ju Jun - known as "Orange County, China"
- Africans in Guangzhou
- Hallstatt (China)
- Qidong Old Quebec
- Chinatown
