= Tense Nervous Headache =

Studio album by Boy George
- Released: 24 October 1988
- Recorded: 1988
- Genres: Dance-rock; soul
- Length: 66:49 (CD/MC), 49:33 (LP)
- Label: Virgin
- Producers: Bobby Z.; Mike Pela; Jeremy Healy; Vlad Naslas

Boy George chronology
Sold (1987)	Tense Nervous Headache (1988)	Boyfriend (1989)

Singles from Tense Nervous Headache
- 1. "Don't Cry" Released: 25 September 1988

Professional ratings
Review scores
Source	Rating
AllMusic	1.5/5 stars

Tense Nervous Headache is the second solo studio album by English singer Boy George, released in October 1988 by Virgin Records. While the album was withdrawn from sale in the United Kingdom, it was still released in Europe but was not released by Virgin in the United States. The title was a reference to a UK television commercial for Anadin.

== Background ==
When the recordings for the album began, Boy George, in his own words, did not know if he wanted to be Prince, Bowie, or Roy Orbison. He started working with Prince-collaborator Bobby Z. but was at the same time inspired by the growing acid house scene and garage music which he had already explored on his protest single "No Clause 28" (UK No. 57) earlier in the year. At one point, Pete Waterman had also been suggested as a producer although no recordings were initiated. Teddy Riley was then flown in from the US to record four new jack swing titles which Boy George was ultimately not happy with and asked to be left off the album. Vlad Naslas wrote and produced a number of dance tracks which Boy George found difficult to write lyrics to, and as a consequence only "I Go Where I Go" made it to the final tracklist. Mike Pela was brought in to contribute three tracks to finish off the album, including a cover version of Jimmy Ruffin's "What Becomes of the Brokenhearted". "Finally, and too late, I was feeling the inspiration", Boy George would later tell in his biography Take It Like a Man, eventually calling the album "self-indulgent, scatterbrained, and painfully out of touch." He still went ahead with a concert tour, "Boy's Own Tour", performing eight of the new tracks, with one show being filmed for a Japanese TV-special.

== Commercial performance ==
The album had been scheduled for an October 1, 1988 release in the UK but was postponed for three weeks to see if sales from the first single "Don't Cry" (released in September) would pick up. When the single stalled at No. 60 in the UK Singles Chart, Virgin eventually decided to pull the album from sale in the UK. It was still released in Europe where it would reach No. 46 in the Swedish charts and No. 38 in Italy. Following its disappointing sales, Virgin quickly released a new album, Boyfriend, in March 1989 with the four previously unreleased Teddy Riley tracks, three other left-over tracks, and the single-only track "No Clause 28" from the previous year.

== Singles ==
"Don't Cry" was the only single released from album. Featuring a more crooner-style vocal, emulating Roy Orbison, it peaked at No. 60 in the UK charts but became a Top 20 hit in Italy where it reached No. 13. "No Clause 28", released in June 1988, would not be included on the final album, except on the Japanese release. "A Boy Called Alice" and "Leave In Love" (a duet with Carroll Thompson) were released as B-sides only.

== Track listing ==
The LP included 9 titles, while the CD & MC editions included 12 titles. The song "Something Strange Called Love" was edited on the LP.

MC: Side 1 (Trk. 1 to 4 + trk. 10 & 11), Side 2 (Trk. 5 to 9 + trk. 12).

No.	Title	Writer(s)	Length
1.	"Don't Cry"	George O'Dowd; Bobby Z.; Ian Maidman	7:01
2.	"You Are My Heroin"	O'Dowd; Glenn Nightingale; Maidman; Richie Stevens; Steve Fletcher	6:20
3.	"I Go Where I Go"	O'Dowd; Vlad Naslas	4:42
4.	"Girl with Combination Skin"	O'Dowd; Nightingale; Maidman; Fletcher	6:02
5.	"Whisper"	O'Dowd; Bobby Z.; Maidman	5:41
6.	"Something Strange Called Love" (LP Edit 4:00)	O'Dowd; Amanda Vincent; Andy Dewar	6:02
7.	"I Love You"	O'Dowd; Nightingale; Maidman; Fletcher	4:47
8.	"Kipsy"	O'Dowd; Caron Geary; Nightingale; Dewar	6:06
9.	"Mama Never Knew"	O'Dowd; Vincent; Maidman	4:57
10.	"What Becomes of the Broken Hearted" (CD & MC only)	William Weatherspoon; James Dean; Paul Riser	3:42
11.	"American Boyz" (CD & MC only)	O'Dowd; Vincent; Maidman; Nightingale	6:20
12.	"Happy Family" (CD & MC only)	O'Dowd; Jeremy Healy	5:07

== Singles ==
- "Don't Cry" (4:06 Edit) (September 1988)

=== B-sides ===
- "A Boy Called Alice" - (O'Dowd, Vic Martin)
- "Leave in Love" – Featuring Carroll Thompson (O'Dowd, Bobby Z.)

== Other songs ==
- "No Clause 28" (June 1988 single, included as a bonus track on Japanese album only)

== Personnel ==
=== Musicians ===
- Alan Douglas – engineer
- Amanda Vincent – keyboards
- Andy Dewar – drum programming
- Anne Dudley – all string arrangements
- Belva Haney – other voices
- Beverley Skeete – other voices
- Bobby Z. – drums
- Boy George – lead vocals
- Carroll Thompson – other voices
- David "Baps" Baptiste – brass section
- David Ulm, Carol Steel – percussion
- Derek Green – other voices
- Desmond Foster – other bass
- Ed Jones – major saxophone
- Glenn Nightingale – guitars and other voices
- Helen Terry – other voices
- Ian Maidman – bass, keyboards
- Iris Sutherland – choir ("Mama Never Knew")
- Jagdeep Singh – tabla and other voices
- Jock Loveband – engineer
- Juliet Roberts, Nevada Cato – other voices
- Kenny Wellington – brass section
- Martin White – engineer
- MC Kinky (Caron Geary) – toasting ("Kipsy")
- Nat Augustin – brass section
- Paul Lee – choir ("Mama Never Knew")
- Paul Wright – engineer
- Phil Legg – engineer
- Renny Hill – engineer
- Richie Stevens – drums ("Kipsy")
- Robin Evans – engineer
- Sid Gauld – brass section
- Simon Tyrell – drum programming
- Teri Reed – engineer
- Vic Martin – keyboards
- Wendell Morrison – other voices
- Yvonne White – choir ("Mama Never Knew")

=== Production ===
- Bobby Z. – producer tracks 1, 2, 4, 5, 7, 9 & 11
- Boy George & Mike Pela - producer tracks 6, 8 & 10
- Jeremy Healy - producer track 12
- Vlad Naslas - producer track 3

== Charts and certifications ==
=== Weekly charts ===
Chart (1987)	Peak position
Australian Albums (ARIA)	145
Italian Albums Chart	38
Swedish Albums Chart	46

== Release history ==
Country	Year	Label	Format	Catalogue
Europe	1988	Virgin Records	CD	259 253, CDV2546
Europe	1988	Virgin Records	LP	209 253, V2546
Europe	1988	Virgin Records	MC	409 253, TCV2546
