= Empty nest syndrome =

Feeling that may be felt by parents whose children leave the house

Empty nest syndrome is a transitional emotional experience characterized by feelings of grief, loneliness, depression, anxiety, and loss of purpose that parents may encounter when their children leave home, such as to live on their own or to pursue a higher education. It is not recognized as a formal clinical diagnosis or mental health disorder. Empty nest syndrome is especially common in single or stay-at-home parents.

== Symptoms and effects ==
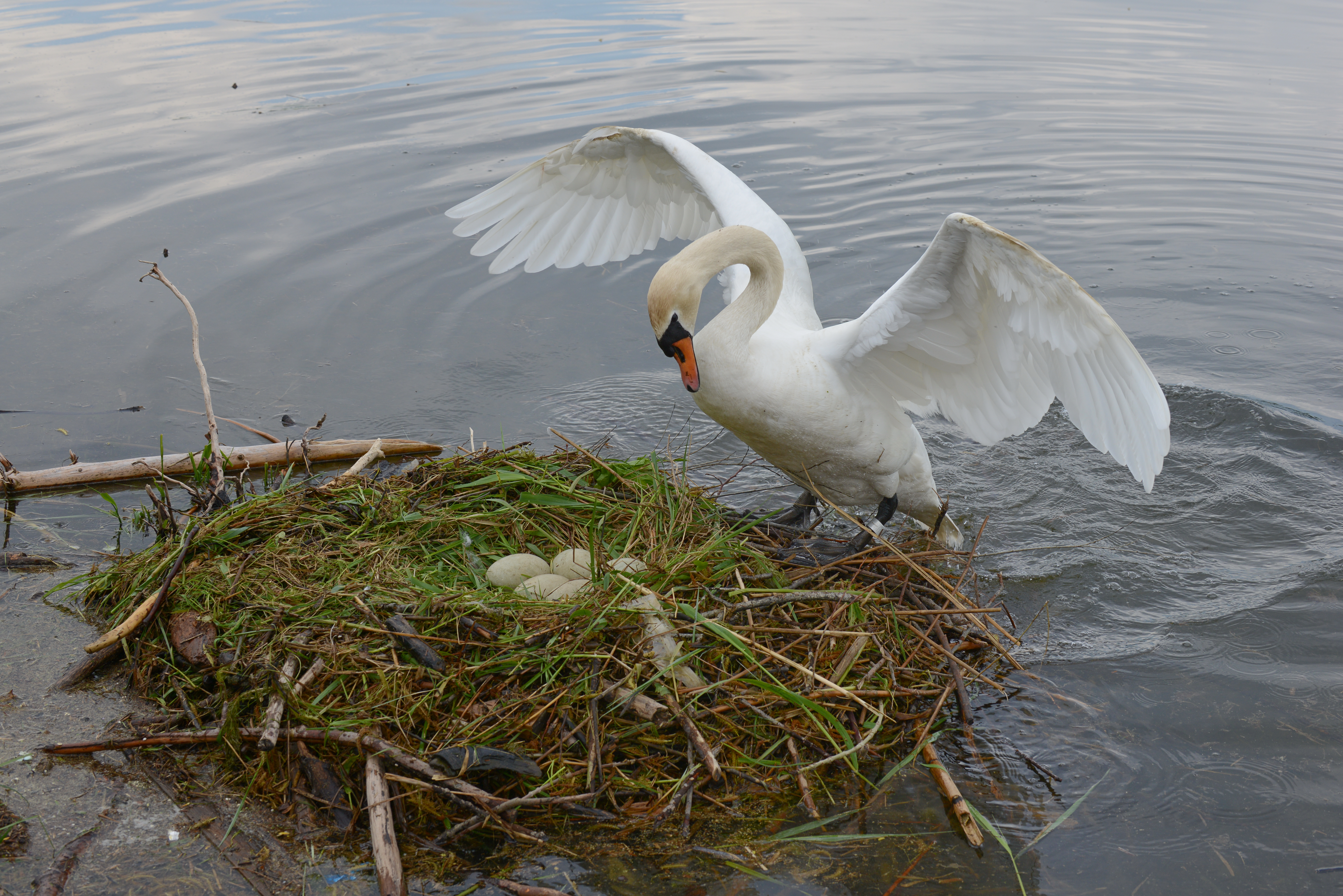
A bird's nest, designed to hold eggs until they hatch

All parents are susceptible to empty nest syndrome, although some factors can create a predisposition to it. Such factors include an unstable or unsatisfactory marriage, a sense of self based primarily on identity as a parent, or difficulty accepting change in general. Full-time parents (stay-at-home mothers or fathers) may be especially vulnerable to empty nest syndrome. Adults who are also dealing with other stressful life events such as the death of a spouse, moving away or retirement are also more likely to experience the syndrome.

Symptoms of empty nest syndrome can include depression, a sense of loss of purpose, feelings of rejection, or worry, stress, and anxiety over the child's welfare. Parents who experience empty nest syndrome often question whether or not they adequately prepared their child to live independently.

Many mothers, often the primary caregivers, are more likely than fathers to experience empty nest syndrome. However, research has shown that some fathers expressed feelings that they were unprepared for the emotional transition that comes with their child leaving home. Others have stated feelings of guilt over lost opportunities to be more involved in their children's lives before they left home.

Empty nest parents often face new challenges, such as establishing a new kind of relationship with their children, having to find other ways to occupy their free time, reconnecting with each other, and a lack of sympathy from people who believe that parents should be happy when their children leave home.

== Coping ==
One of the easiest ways for parents to cope with empty nest syndrome is to keep in contact with their children. Technological developments such as cell phones, text messaging, and the internet all allow for increased communication between parents and their children. Parents going through empty nest syndrome can ease their stress by pursuing their own hobbies and interests in their increased spare time. Discussing their grief with each other, friends, families, or professionals may help them. Experts have advised that overwhelmed parents keep a journal, or go back to work if they were full-time parents.

It is important for an empty nester to realize that what they are feeling is normal. It is normal to feel some loss in self when becoming an empty nester. But it is important to replace the meaningful experience of parenting with other meaningful experiences. What can help to find meaningful experiences is to make a list of roles that a person has fulfilled in their life and then seek roles that can be expanded on to add meaning in life.

== Recent trends ==
Since the 2000s, the so-called "Boomerang Generation"—young adults who return to live with their parents—have changed the dynamics of the traditional empty nest phenomenon. Factors such as the high unemployment rate in the United States and constrained job markets have been used to explain the surge in such individuals. Census data from 2008 showed that as many as 20 million 18–34-year-olds (34% of that age group) were living at home with their parents. A decade earlier, only 23% of people in that age group did so. In Canada, multigenerational living is increasing.

== In popular culture ==
=== Comics ===
- Peter de Wit drew Het Lege Nest, a 2011 graphic novel about his personal experience involving empty nest syndrome and psychological advice to overcome these feelings.

=== Film ===
- In An Extremely Goofy Movie, Goofy suffers from empty nest syndrome after his son Max departs for college. During his work hours at the toy assembly line, Goofy's sadness results in him being careless and eventually resulting in him inadvertently causing a massive explosion in the factory leading to Goofy getting fired from his job.
- In the 2018 animated Pixar short film Bao, an aging and lonely Chinese mother suffers from empty nest syndrome until she gets an unexpected second chance at motherhood when her homemade baozi dumpling comes to life.
- In Paddington in Peru, Mrs Brown experiences the beginnings of empty nest syndrome, resulting in her agreeing that the family take a trip to Peru to visit Paddington's Aunt Lucy and to bring them closer together as a family one last time.

=== TV ===
- Empty Nest, an American sitcom (1988–1995), deals with a situation where the protagonist's wife dies and his two adult daughters move in with him.
- In the Netflix show Fuller House, Aunt Becky seems to be suffering from either this, or baby fever, or both, after her twin sons go to college, as she displays an extreme attachment to DJ's baby son Tommy.
