= Danshi =

Japanese term for nontraditional masculinity

Danshi means "young man" in Japanese and its modern context is used to describe nontraditional masculine men. The most common version of it is "soushokukei danshi", which was coined in 2006 by Maki Fukasawa and translates to "herbivore man". It has gained traction in Japan to describe men who do not pursue women and have little interest in sex and a smaller desire to work corporate salary jobs. They are also more likely to shop in a feminine manner rather than a masculine one. The term has been used to describe "feminine men". This term has led to many other similar terms describing masculinity in Japan. These terms often include diet-related terminology to denote them from one another. One such term is kurīmu danshi ("creamy men"), who are characterized by their care for women's feelings and have a soft but masculine personality.

== Definition ==
A danshi is a young man who embraces nontraditional masculinity in Japan. Traditional masculinity in Japan involves being a breadwinner for the family and being aggressive when seducing women. In post-war Japan, it replaced the soldier as the biggest form of male masculinity. This fashion of masculinity has been fading among 20-34-year-old men as 60% of them identified as a "Soushokukei danshi". One theory of the origin of the myriad of danshi is societal pressures put on men to work a salary job and provide for the family. They have decided to push back against this as it does not match their desires.

== Array of danshi ==
- Soushokukei danshi are "herbivore men". This is the most common type in society. They are more passive regarding relationships and are mainly interested in platonic friendships.
- Gyoshoku danshi, which are "fish-eating men". They are more patient about romance and will get to be friends and know the woman before making a move.
- Nikushoku danshi, which are "carnivorous men". They are the traditional masculine idea of being aggressive in seducing women.
- Kurimu danshi, which are "creamy men". These men are masculine but have a gentler side to them. They are often very kind.
- Rōru kyabetsu danshi are "rolled cabbage men". They look like herbivore men but become a carnivorous man when they meet a woman.

== Nontraditional masculinity ==
All of these categories of danshi correspond to a different kind of masculinity, most of which are nontraditional. For instance, they may adopt a more feminine shopping behavior such as fashion and beauty products and unlike traditional masculinity, they enjoy cooking and eating sweets. These two activities are seen as feminine in Japanese society. The older generation deems all kinds of danshi but the carnivorous as effeminate and emasculated.

== Danshi in relationships ==
Danshi take different approaches to relationships than those who exhibit traditional masculinity. For instance, they may have a sexless marriage as 45% of married couples in Japan are sexless. Most of these couples are content with this and their relationship remains strong. These relationships are monogamous and soushokukei danshi assumes a more passive role. This passive role comes from wanting an equal relationship with women, a lack of self-confidence, and a preference for a close platonic relationship with women. Gyoshoku danshi wait for women to give them attention and love by becoming friends first. Kurimu Danshi care for women's feelings and get to know and form relationships this way. Nikushoku danshi are aggressive in seducing women and do not wait around or try to get them to know them as well initially.

== See also ==
- Asexuality
- Feminine Men
- Masculinity
- Sexless Marriage
- Soushokukei danshi
