= Boyfriend (Boy George album) =

Studio album by Boy George
- Released: April 1989
- Recorded: 1988–89
- Genres: Dance-pop; new jack swing
- Length: 39:52
- Label: Virgin
- Producers: Gene Griffin; Teddy Riley; Bobby Z.; Jeremy Healy; Vlad Naslas

Boy George chronology
Tense Nervous Headache (1988)	Boyfriend (1989)	High Hat (1989)

Singles from Boyfriend
- 1. "No Clause 28" Released: June 1988; 2. "Don't Take My Mind on a Trip" Released: 2 February 1989; 3. "You Found Another Guy" Released: 1989; 4. "Whether They Like It or Not" Released: June 1989

Boyfriend is the third solo studio album by English singer Boy George, released in April 1989 by Virgin Records, just six months after his previous album, Tense Nervous Headache, which Virgin Records decided to not release in the United Kingdom, due to its lead-single "Don't Cry" performing poorly.

== Background and release ==
Upon a suggestion from Sharon Heyward, head of the Black Music department of Virgin, American producers Gene Griffin and Teddy Riley flew over to London during sessions for Tense Nervous Headache to record four tracks which Boy George disliked. "I thought Teddy and I would write together," he'd later tell in his autobiography Take It Like a Man. "I agreed to sing them if I could work on the lyrics, which I did with little success. I convinced myself the fat beats and production would compensate for the lack of substance. I was wrong. When I received the final mixes I went into depression (...) They'd invested a ridiculous $75,000 and didn't care about my artistic integrity." The tracks were left off the Headache album. Virgin, now refusing to have anything more to do with that album, went ahead and released "Don't Take My Mind on a Trip" in February 1989 in an attempt to recoup their money." Despite it continuing Boy George's disappointing charts performances when it only made No. 68 in the UK Singles Chart, it peaked at No. 5 on the US Billboard R&B Charts and No. 26 on the Billboard Dance Charts, prompting Virgin to go ahead and put a new album together, assembling the four Riley/Griffin tracks on side one, and two previously unreleased tracks on side two as well as two previously released tracks "Girlfriend" from the soundtrack Slaves of New York and "No Clause 28" protest single (No. 57 UK charts, June 1988). The artwork from Headache was simply recycled for the new package, although a slightly different shot from the same photo sessions was chosen.

== Commercial performance ==
The album failed to chart anywhere. A second single "Whether They Like It or Not" was released in Europe in June 1989. "I did the rounds on automatic," Boy George admitted. "It was enough misery to make me finally realize that I knew better." In America, Virgin Records decided to put together the album High Hat, combining the Griffin/Riley recordings with five of the tracks from Headache.

== Track listing ==
No.	Title	Writer(s)	Length
1.	"Don't Take My Mind on a Trip" (*)	Gene Griffin	6:14
2.	"You Found Another Guy"	Griffin; Bernard Belle; William Middleton	4:29
3.	"Whether They Like It or Not"	Griffin; O'Dowd; Belle	4:42
4.	"I'm Not Sleeping Anymore"	Griffin; O'Dowd	4:22
5.	"Lies"	O'Dowd; Vlad Naslas	4:32
6.	"Big Dark Man (Waiting)"	O'Dowd; Amanda Vincent; Joseph Hornof	4:03
7.	"Girlfriend"	O'Dowd; Naslas	5:03
8.	"No Clause 28 (Hi-Energy Mix)" (+)	O'Dowd; Caron Geary; Nightingale; Dewar	6:22

(*)"Don't Take My Mind on a Trip" is an unnamed remix that appears as 'Main Club Mix' or 'U.S. Club Mix' on 'Trip' singles. The 'original' version appears on the North American album counterpart, High Hat.

(+)"No Clause 28" appears as 'Hi Energy Mix' which had appeared as 'Emilio Pasquez Space Face Full Remix' on 'Clause' singles. The same mix would also be included on Boy George's next album, The Martyr Mantras, as 'Pascal Gabriel Mix'.

== Personnel ==
=== Musicians Trk. 1 to 4 ===
- Boy George – lead vocals
- Lee Drakeford – backing vocals
- Zan – backing vocals
- Marsha McClurkin – backing vocals
- Mauricette Martin – backing vocals
- Teddy Riley – all instruments, backing vocals, arrangements
- Bernard Belle – acoustic guitar & backing vocals
- Dennis Mitchell – engineer
- Bill Esses – assistant engineer
- Gene Griffin – production

=== Musicians Trk. 5 to 8 ===
- Boy George – lead vocals
- Glenn Nightingale – guitars and other voices
- Ian Maidman – bass, keyboards
- Amanda Vincent – keyboards
- Vlas Naslas – keyboards
- Derek Green – backing vocals
- Carroll Thompson – backing vocals
- Helen Terry – backing vocals
- Beverley Skeete – backing vocals
- Belva Haney – backing vocals
- David Ulm, Carol Steel – percussion

=== Production ===
- Gene Griffin - producer side 1 (track 1 to 4)
- Vlad Naslas - producer track 5, 7
- Mike Pela - producer track 6
- Bobby Z. & Jeremy Healy - producer track 8

== Charts ==
=== Singles ===
Year	Single	Chart	Position
1988	"No Clause 28"	Italy Airplay (Music & Media)	19
1988	"No Clause 28"	UK Singles (Official Charts)	57
1989	"Don't Take My Mind on a Trip"	Italy Airplay (Music & Media)	6
1989	"Don't Take My Mind on a Trip"	UK Singles (Official Charts)	68
1989	"Don't Take My Mind on a Trip"	US Dance Club Songs (Billboard)	26
1989	"Don't Take My Mind on a Trip"	US Hot R&B/Hip-Hop Songs (Billboard)	5

== Release history ==
Country	Year	Label	Format	Catalogue
Europe	1989	Virgin Records	CD	259 762
Europe	1989	Virgin Records	MC	409 762
Europe	1989	Virgin Records	LP	209 762
