= Masahiro Morioka =

Japanese philosopher (born 1958)

- Born: September 25, 1958 (age 67); Kōchi, Kōchi, Japan

Philosophical work
- Era: 20th-/21st-century philosophy
- Region: Western/Eastern philosophy
- School: Continental philosophy, Asian philosophy, Analytic philosophy, bioethics
- Main interests: Philosophy of life, metaphysics, ethics, men's studies, civilization studies
- Notable ideas: Painless civilization, birth affirmation, frigid man, animated persona

Masahiro Morioka (森岡 正博, Morioka Masahiro; born September 25, 1958) is a Japanese philosopher, who has contributed to the fields of philosophy of life, bioethics, gender studies, media theory, and civilization studies. He is a professor of philosophy and ethics at Waseda University, Japan. He coined the term "life studies" for an integrated approach to the issues of life, death, and nature in contemporary society. Since 2006 he has proposed a new philosophical discipline he calls "philosophy of life". He has published numerous academic books and articles, mainly in Japanese, and has regularly contributed commentaries and book reviews to major Japanese newspapers and magazines. His books include Painless Civilization, which criticizes the incessant attempts to escape from pain and suffering in modern civilization, Confessions of a Frigid Man: A Philosopher's Journey into the Hidden Layers of Men's Sexuality, which illuminates some of the darker sides of male sexuality such as the "Lolita complex" and male frigidity, and Lessons in Love for Herbivore Men, one of the books that helped popularize the term "herbivore men". He is the editor-in-chief of Journal of Philosophy of Life, an associate editor of Eubios Journal of Asian and International Bioethics, and a steering committee member of the International Conference on Philosophy and Meaning in Life.

== Biography ==
Morioka was born in Kōchi Prefecture, Japan, in 1958 and entered the University of Tokyo in 1977. In the beginning he studied physics and mathematics but he later turned to philosophy and ethics. In graduate school he specialized in bioethics and environmental ethics, a newly emerging field at that time as well as Wittgenstein's later philosophy. He published two books on bioethics, An Invitation to the Study of Life and Brain Dead Person, and moved to the International Research Center for Japanese Studies, Kyoto, in 1988. There he wrote several books including How to Live in a Post-religious Age and Consciousness Communication; the former is a philosophical and psychological analysis of Aum Shinrikyo's sarin gas attack on the Tokyo subway that occurred in 1995 and the latter discusses subconscious interactions in the age of computer communications (Consciousness Communication won The Telecom Social Science award in 1993). He spent one year as a visiting scholar at Wesleyan University, Connecticut, US, in 1991.

In 1997, he moved to Osaka Prefecture University where he taught philosophy and ethics. In 2001 he published Life Studies Approaches to Bioethics, in which he discussed brain death and organ transplantation, feminist bioethics and abortion, the disability rights movement, and new forms of eugenics from the perspective of "life studies". In this book he introduces concepts such as "the fundamental sense of security" and "the reality of a deeply shaken self", which he discovered through an examination of Japanese bioethics literature written in the 1970s. He published Painless Civilization, mentioned above, in 2003. This is considered by many his most important and influential book to date. His books on men's studies, also mentioned above, have been frequently referred to in the field of gender studies. He published Manga Introduction to Philosophy in 2013. He played an important role in the revision of the organ transplantation law in Japan in the years 2000–2009. He asserted that organs should not be harvested from small children who have been declared brain dead but his proposal was ultimately rejected by the Diet.

He moved to the School of Human Sciences, Waseda University, in 2015. A critical study of antinatalist philosophy, Would It Have Been Better Never to Have Been Born? sparked much discussion in Japan in 2020.

== Key concepts ==
=== Brain death as a human relationship ===
Morioka defines brain death not as a material process occurring inside the brain but as a human relationship formed between a comatose patient and his/her family members or others who surround him/her. He calls this a "human relationship oriented analysis" approach to bioethics. He claims that brain death is not necessarily human death.

=== Consciousness communication ===
In his 1993 book Consciousness Communication he distinguished "consciousness communication", communication for the purpose of social interaction itself, from "information communication", communication used as a tool for conveying information. He predicted that consciousness communication would play a central role in the coming information society, and put forward the concepts of "community of anonymity" and "dream navigator".

=== Life studies ===
Morioka calls his comprehensive approach to the issues of life, death, and nature "life studies". The ultimate goal of life studies is to help people to live their lives without regret. Morioka asserts that the most important aspect of life studies is never to detach ourselves from the problems we are tackling and never to think of ourselves as exceptions; He encourages us to keep our eyes on our own desires and the evil that he believes is deeply engraved in our hearts.

=== Fundamental sense of security ===
The fundamental sense of security is one of the central concepts in Morioka's philosophy. In the book Life Studies Approaches to Bioethics he describes this as "a sense of security that allows me to strongly believe that even if I had been unintelligent, ugly, or disabled, my existence in the world itself would have been equally welcomed, and whether I succeed or fail, and even if I become a doddering old man, my existence will continue to be welcomed". He asserts that this is a precondition of our being able to live our lives without regret.

=== Painless civilization ===
Morioka asserts that our contemporary civilization is developing in the form of a "painless civilization". He asserts that this civilization's limitless penchant for eliminating pain and suffering makes us completely lose sight of the meaning of life that is indispensable to human beings and deprives us of the joy of life in exchange for pleasure, pleasantness, and comfort. He further claims that people in advanced countries know that they are drowning in the tide of their painless civilization but do not know how to escape from it.

=== Frigid man / Herbivore men ===
Morioka uses the phrase "frigid man" to describe a man who suffers from sexual frigidity caused by "male frigidity" and has a (sub-conscious) attraction toward young girls, especially girls wearing school uniforms. Many Japanese adult males suffer from this condition and love to see the images of young girls in the mass media and on the Internet. This is the pathology hidden behind the Japanese male's "Lolita complex". In Morioka's writings, "herbivore men" are timid young Japanese men who are inexperienced and unassertive in love and sex. Just after the publication of Morioka's book, Lessons in Love for Herbivore Men, 2008, the term "herbivore men" became a buzz word in Japan and was reported worldwide.

=== Philosophy of life ===
The philosophy of life is a new discipline in contemporary philosophy that aims to examine the topics of life, death, and nature from various philosophical angles. It widens the scope of the 19th century Europe's Lebensphilosophie and encompasses contemporary bioethics, environmental philosophy, philosophy of biology, biopolitics, the study of the meaning of human life, and other areas of research.

=== Birth affirmation ===
This is one of the key concepts in Morioka's philosophy of life. Birth affirmation means to be able to say yes, from the bottom of our hearts, to the fact that we have been born. Morioka distinguishes "birth affirmation" from similar concepts such as "survival affirmation" and "affirmation of one's whole life". He considers "birth negation" as the worst form of human evil.

=== Animated persona ===
The soundless voice saying "I am here" that appears on the surface of something or someone. Morioka argues that it appears on a corpse, a wooden mask, or even a tree, as a kind of personhood.

== Publications ==
=== Books (English) ===
- 2017 Confessions of a Frigid Man: A Philosopher's Journey into the Hidden Layers of Men's Sexuality ISBN 978-1-5424-4717-1 PDF Tokyo Philosophy Project, Open Access Book
- 2021 Manga Introduction to Philosophy: An Exploration of Time, Existence, the Self, and the Meaning of Life ISBN 978-4-9908668-5-3 PDF Tokyo Philosophy Project, Open Access Book
- 2021 Painless Civilization 1: A Philosophical Critique of Desire PDF Tokyo Philosophy Project, Open Access Book
- 2023 Painless Civilization 2: Painless Stream and the Fate of Love PDF Tokyo Philosophy Project, Open Access Book
- 2024 What Is Antinatalism? And Other Essays: Philosophy of Life in Contemporary Society, Second Edition ISBN 979-8-8840-6815-5 PDF Tokyo Philosophy Project, Open Access Book
- 2025 How to Live in a Post-Religious Age: Terrorism, Philosophy, and the Meaning of Life ISBN 979-8-3170-6197-5 PDF Tokyo Philosophy Project, Open Access Book

=== Books (English, Edited by Morioka) ===
- 2015 Masahiro Morioka (ed.) Reconsidering Meaning in Life: A Philosophical Dialogue with Thaddeus Metz (Journal of Philosophy of Life) ISBN 978-4-9908668-0-8 PDF Open Access Book
- 2017 Masahiro Morioka (ed.) Nihilism and the Meaning of Life: A Philosophical Dialogue with James Tartaglia (Journal of Philosophy of Life) ISBN 978-4-9908668-2-2 PDF Open Access Book
- 2023 Masahiro Morioka (ed.) Artificial Intelligence, Robots, and Philosophy (Journal of Philosophy of Life) ISBN 978-4-9908668-9-1 PDF Open Access Book

=== Books (Japanese, incomplete) ===
- 1988 An Invitation to the Study of Life (生命学への招待 Keiso Shobo, in Japanese) ISBN 4-326-15209-5
- 1989 Brain-Dead Person: Human Relationship-Oriented Analysis of Brain Death (脳死の人 Tokyo Shoseki, in Japanese) ISBN 4-8318-5603-7 HTML
- 1993 Consciousness Communication (意識通信 Chikuma Shobo, in Japanese) ISBN 4-480-08708-7
- 1994 Reconsidering the View of Life (生命観を問いなおす Chikuma Shobo, in Japanese) ISBN 4-480-05612-2
- 1996 How to Live in a Post-Religious Age (宗教なき時代を生きるために Hozokan, in Japanese) ISBN 4-8318-7225-3
- 1997 An Intellectual Method of Facing Oneself (自分と向き合う「知」の方法 PHP Publications, in Japanese) ISBN 4-480-42230-7
- 2001 Life Studies Approaches to Bioethics: A New Perspective on Brain Death, Feminism, and Disability (生命学に何ができるか：脳死・フェミニズム・優生思想 Keiso Shobo, in Japanese) ISBN 4-326-65261-6
- 2001 Life Torn Apart (引き裂かれた生命 kinokopress.com, in Japanese)
- 2003 Painless Civilization: A Philosophical Critique of Desire (無痛文明論 Transview Publications, in Japanese) ISBN 4-901510-18-5
- 2005 Confessions of a Frigid Man: A Philosopher's Journey into the Hidden Layers of Men's Sexuality (感じない男 Chikuma Shobo, in Japanese) ISBN 4-480-06221-1
- 2005 Life Studies for Beginners: A Philosophy for Facing Oneself (生命学をひらく Transview, in Japanese) ISBN 4-901510-34-7
- 2008 Lessons in Love for Herbivore Men (草食系男子の恋愛学 Media Factory, in Japanese) ISBN 4-8401-2376-4
- 2009 Herbivore Men will Bring Your Last Love (最後の恋は草食系男子が持ってくる Magazine House, in Japanese) ISBN 4-8387-1999-X
- 2009 The 33rd Stone: A Philosophy for a Wounded Age (33個めの石 Shunju Sha, in Japanese) ISBN 4-393-33291-1
- 2012 Connecting the Living and the Deceased: A Philosophy for Requiescat and Rebirth (生者と死者をつなぐ Shunju Sha, in Japanese) ISBN 4-393-33313-6
- 2013 Manga Introduction to Philosophy (まんが 哲学入門 Koudan sha, in Japanese) ISBN 4-062-88216-7
- 2015 Philosophy, Trauma, Sexuality: Book Reviews 1986–2001 (書評という快楽 Kinokopress, in Japanese)
- 2015 A Philosophical Inquiry into Personhood, Dignity, and Brain Death (脳死概念における人格性と尊厳の哲学的研究, Kinokopress, in Japanese)
- 2020 Would It Have Been Better Never to Have Been Born? (生まれてこないほうが良かったのか？, Chikuma Shobo, in Japanese)

=== Selected English papers ===
- 1991 The Concept of Inochi PDF
- 2001 Reconsidering Brain Death: A Lesson from Japan's Fifteen Years of Experience.
- 2011 Natural Right to Grow and Die in the Form of Wholeness: A Philosophical Interpretation of the Ontological Status of Brain-dead Children. PDF
- 2011 Narrative Responsibility and Moral Dilemma. PDF With Takanobu Kinjo
- 2013 A Phenomenological Study of "Herbivore Men." PDF
- 2015 Feminism, Disability, and Brain Death: Alternative Voices from Japanese Bioethics. PDF
- 2021 Animated Persona: The Ontological Status of a Deceased Person Who Continues to Appear in This World PDF
- 2022 Is It Possible to Say 'Yes' to Traumatic Experiences?: A Philosophical Approach to Human Suffering PDF
- 2022 The Concept of Painless Civilization and the Philosophy of Biological Evolution: With Reference to Jonas, Freud, and Bataille PDF
- 2023 The Sense of Someone Appearing There: A Philosophical Investigation into Other Minds, Deceased People, and Animated Persona doi
- 2023 Artificial Intelligence and Contemporary Philosophy: Heidegger, Jonas, and Slime Mold PDF
- 2025 A Phenomenological Approach to the Philosophy of Meaning in Life doi
- 2026 The Paradox of Sentiocentric Antinatalism: The Obligation of Extinction or the Obligation of Survival? doi
