= Ju Jun =

American-style suburb in Beijing, China

Coordinates: 40.155°N 116.411°E

Ju Jun 橘郡
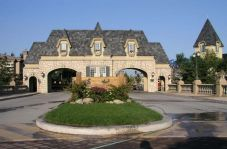
- Interactive map of Ju Jun
- Country: People's Republic of China
- Municipality: Beijing
- Time zone: UTC+8 (China Standard)

Ju Jun (Chinese: 橘郡; pinyin: Jú jùn; lit. 'Orange County') is a $60 million, 143-unit housing development situated about one hour north of Beijing, China, consisting entirely of expensive American-style townhouses and tract homes, decorated and furnished with American products. The Chinese developer Zhang Bo built the community to anticipate the 2008 Olympics to be held in Beijing.

All 143 units were sold within a month of going on sale, in a phenomenon the Beijing media called "The Orange Storm." Designed by architect Aram Bassenian of Bassenian/Lagoni Architects from Newport Beach, California in Orange County, California, the Orange County development is an example of wealthy Chinese adopting the suburban American built form.

== See also ==
- Thames Town
- Miyun District
- Jackson Hole, China
- Europe Street
- Hallstatt (China)
- Qidong Old Quebec
