= Jackson Hole, China =

Jackson Hole 原乡美利坚 (Hometown, USA)
- Resort town
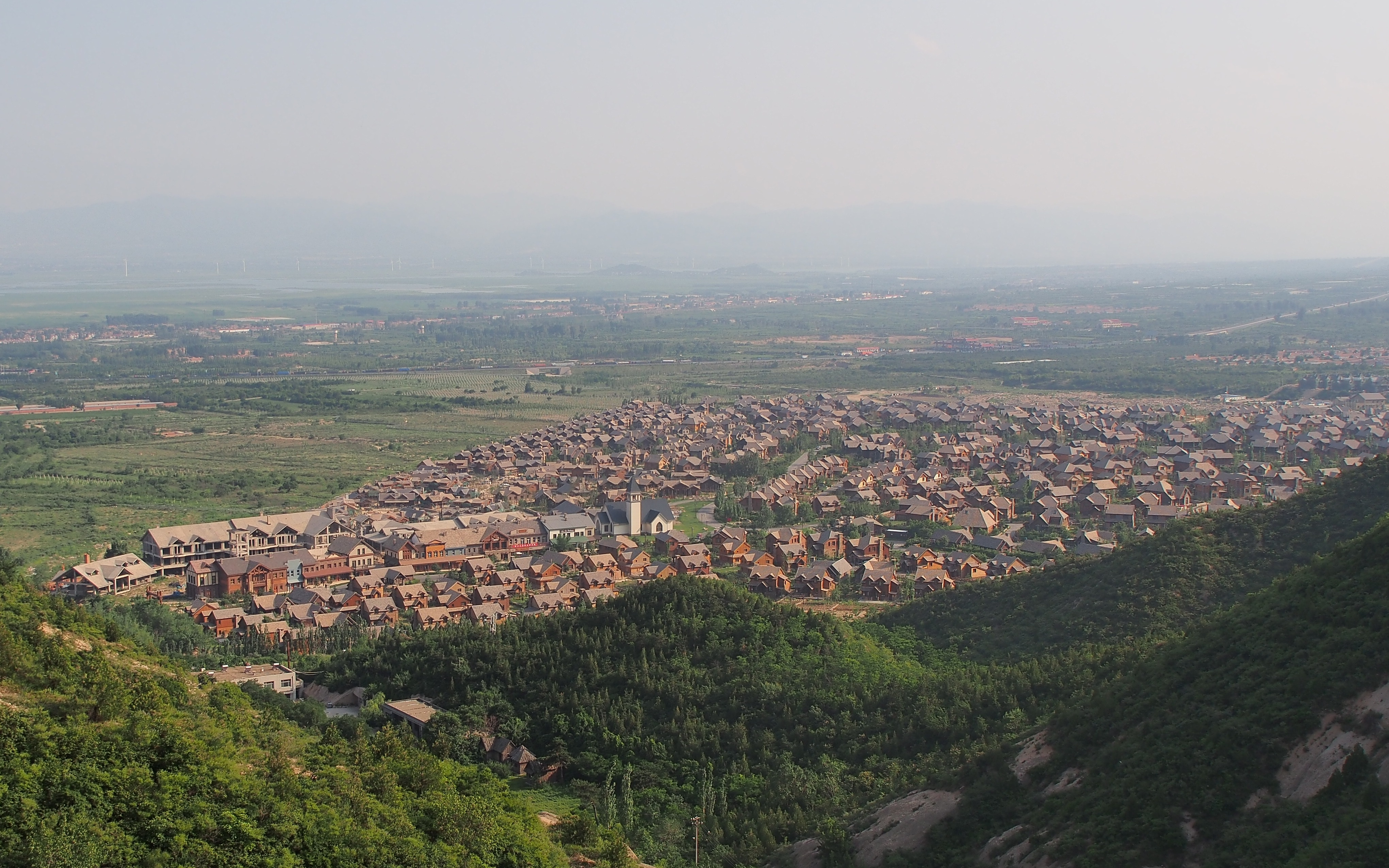

- Location of Jackson Hole in Hebei Jackson Hole (Beijing) Jackson Hole (China)
- Coordinates: 40°27′27″N 115°45′48″E
- Country: People's Republic of China
- Province: Hebei
- City: Zhangjiakou
- Time zone: UTC+8 (China Standard)

Jackson Hole is a resort town on the border between Huailai County, Zhangjiakou, Hebei Province, China, and Yanqing District, Beijing, wedged between Taihang and Yan mountain ranges. Its architecture and design is inspired by the town of Jackson, Wyoming in the United States.

Its translated Chinese name is Hometown, U.S.A (Chinese: 原乡美利坚; pinyin: yuán xiāng měilìjiān). Resort towns in the countryside of China are rare and are usually associated with being agrarian.

== History ==
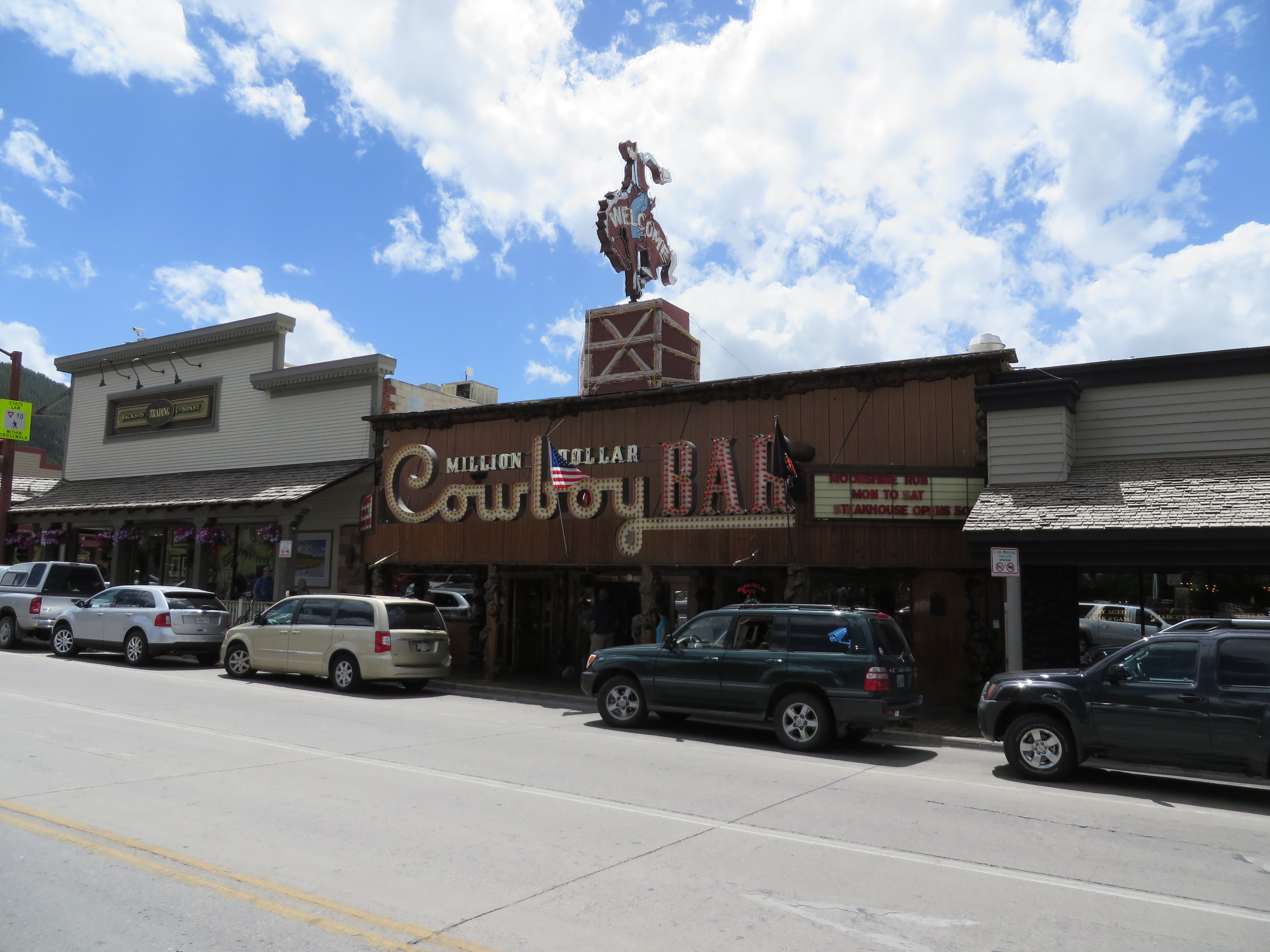
Jackson, Wyoming was the inspiration for the resort town. Though sometimes described as a clone of the American town, the resort is not an exact replica.

The Beijing Resplendency Great Exploit Real Estate Company hired interior designer Allison Smith to create an area of US-styled second home housing in Hebei Province. Smith researched various resort locations including Martha's Vineyard; Vail, Colorado and Jackson Hole, Wyoming, with Beijing Resplendency choosing the latter for the design and theme of the resort town.

The 1,000 single-home housing development used stock Western home plans from an architect in Oregon, adding designs reminiscent of "Billy the Kid, Geronimo, Stagecoach Station, Betsy, Big Bear, etc.". In Smith's research she collected "cowhide, antler chandeliers, saddle blankets, lodge pole chairs, wagon wheels, Navajo rugs, iron light fixtures, wildlife scene fireplace screens, wooden snowshoes, leather throw pillows, horseshoes, Charles Russell prints and plaid curtains", and shipped them to the site in China.

The project was completed in 2009.

Liu Xiangyang, the Developer of the Community, said his selling point was more than architecture; his buyers wanted freedom and spirituality, so he built a Christian church in the center of the community for residents.

== Property values ==
According to Smith, the properties "... have sold out and nearly tripled in value since being built." As the first model was put up in a Beijing park for display, "... people apparently went nuts for it."

== See also ==
- Europe Street
- Hallstatt (China)
- Thames Town
- Ju Jun – known as "Orange County, China"
