= Human Affairs =

- Discipline: Humanities and Social Science
- Language: English
- Edited by: Gabriel Bianchi

Publication details
- History: 1991–Present
- Publisher: De Gruyter on behalf of the Slovak Academy of Sciences (Slovakia)
- Impact factor: 0.6 (2024)

Standard abbreviations
- ISO 4: Hum. Aff.

Indexing
- CODEN: HUAFFZ
- ISSN: 1210-3055 (print); 1337-401X (web)
- LCCN: 94091776 sf 94091776
- OCLC no.: 60617903

Links
- Journal homepage; Online access

Human Affairs is a humanities and social science journal, published by the Slovak Academy of Sciences. It was founded in 1990. The journal focuses on contemporary human affairs, with the goal to advance human self-understanding and communication. It publishes articles in English.
