= Hallstatt (China) =

Housing development in Luoyang, Boluo County, China

- 五矿·哈施塔特
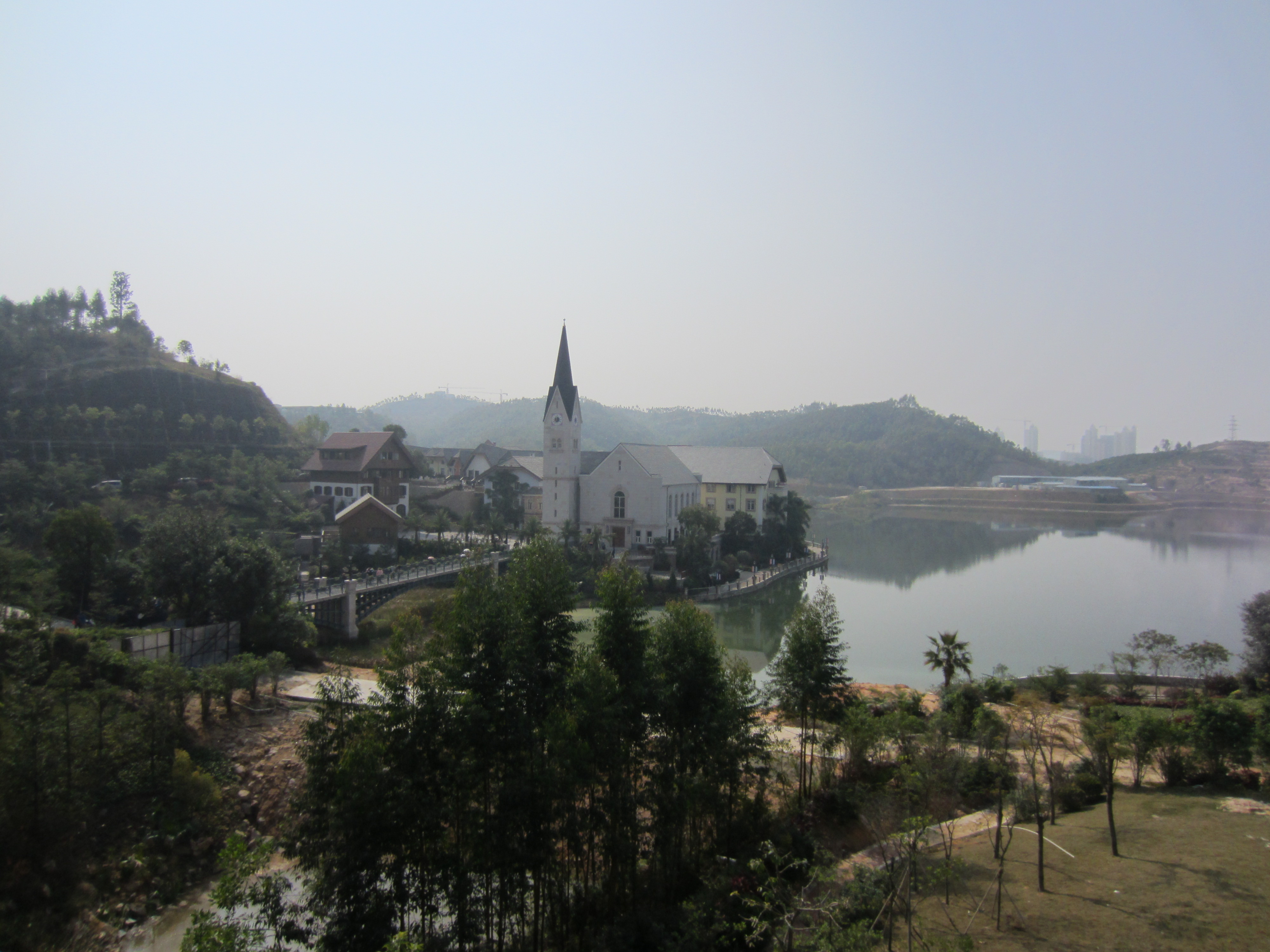
- Hallstatt, China
- Nickname: Hallstatt II
- Location in China
- Coordinates: 23°10′52″N 114°19′35.6″E
- Country: China
- Province: Guangdong
- Time zone: China Standard Time

Hallstatt
- Simplified Chinese: 五矿·哈施塔特
- Traditional Chinese: 五礦·哈施塔特
Transcriptions
Standard Mandarin
- Hanyu Pinyin: Wǔkuàng Hāshītǎtè
Yue: Cantonese
- Jyutping: ng5 kong3 haa1 si1 taap3 dak6

Hallstatt (Chinese: 五矿·哈施塔特) is a housing development in the town of Luoyang located in Boluo County within the city of Huizhou, Guangdong, China. Its urban core is modelled after the small town of Hallstatt in Austria, a World Heritage Site. The center of the area contains a replica of the parish church, the fountain and various other objects from the original Hallstatt town centre.

The housing project was built by the China Minmetals Ltd., a wholly owned Hong Kong-listed subsidiary of China's largest steel and mining company, China Minmetals Corp. The name officially used by the operator is "Hallstatt See - Huizhou".

== Transport links ==
Hallstatt See is located in the economic region of the Pearl River Delta, in the prefecture of Huizhou and here directly in front of the city of Huizhou. Due to the direct affiliation to the city of Huizhou and its infrastructure network, it can also be reached consciously from the nearby southern Chinese economic metropolises such as Guangzhuou, Shenzhen or Hong Kong. Huizhou has an airport, highways and high-speed trains. 6 pairs of high speed trains have been in service for passengers travelling from Hong Kong to Huizhou or from to Hong Kong. It takes around 70–80 minutes to cover the 96 km (60 mi) distance between Hong Kong West Kowloon station and Huizhou South station.

The nearly 70 Shenzhen–Huizhou high-speed trains take 30–70 minutes to cover the 56 km (30 mi) route. Most of these trains depart from Shenzhen North railway station, while only four depart from Futian railway station.

At the destination end, most trains arrive at Huizhou South railway station, while a few terminate at Huidong railway station. About 20 conventional trains also operate on this route, taking 1.5–2 hours to complete the journey.

== Reception in Austria ==
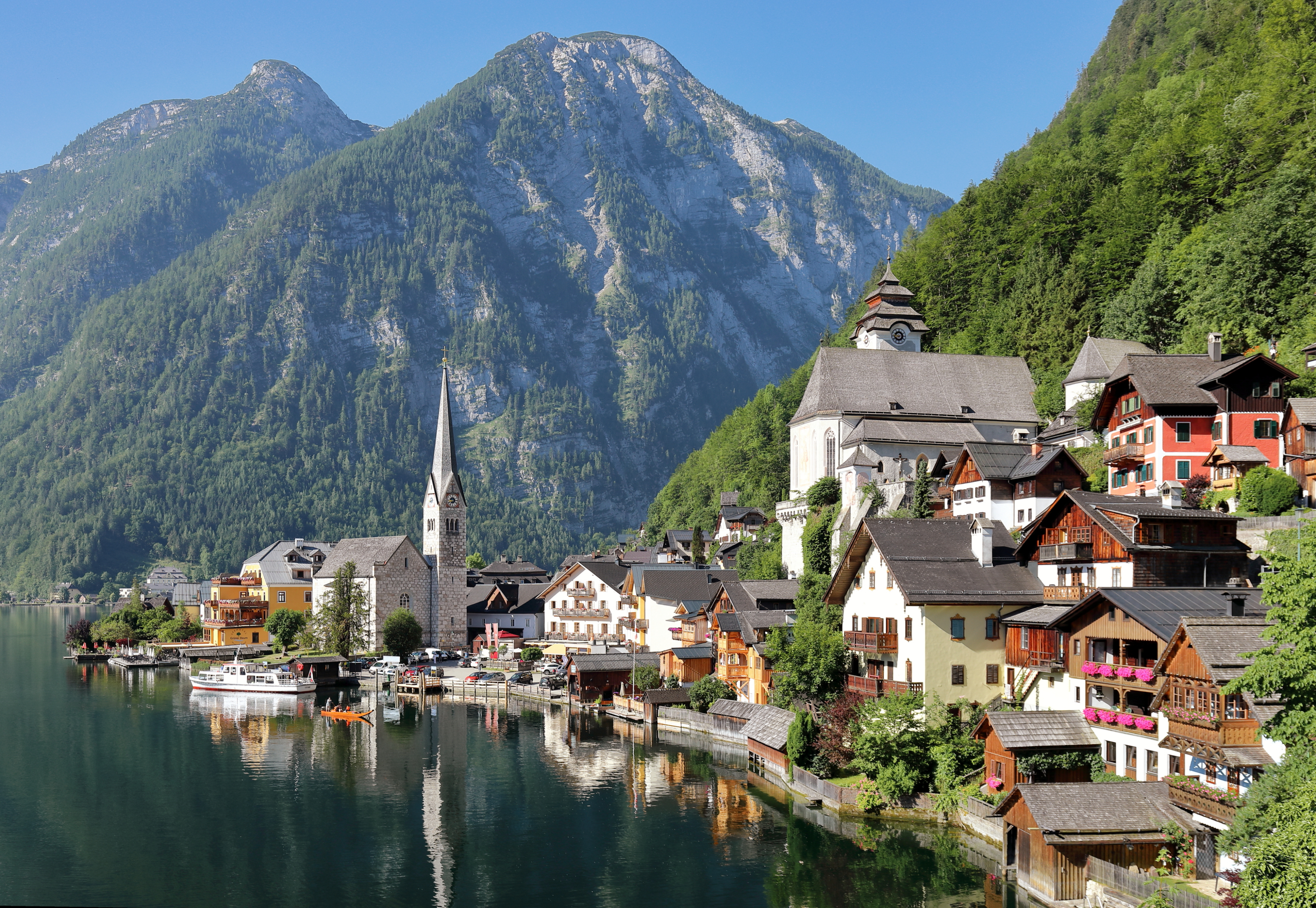
The original

Hallstatt's mayor Alexander Scheutz first heard about the plans to build a replica of his town in 2011. At that point, the construction was already in an advanced state.

While parts of the Hallstatt population viewed the Chinese plans with scepticism, Scheutz said that he saw a chance in the project for the tourism in the "original" Hallstatt. He personally visited the opening ceremony in 2012 and signed an agreement for cultural exchange.

== Similar projects in China ==
The construction of Hallstatt is part of a trend in China to mimic or rebuild other parts of the world. While this is one of only a few examples where a whole town layout has been partly replicated (the second being Venice), there are many similar places in China. Other examples include a copy of the Eiffel Tower in Tianducheng and European castles built by cake magnate Liu Chonghua in Chongqing. There is also a copy of Jackson Hole, Wyoming, in Hebei province (Jackson Hole, China) and a replica of Venice in Dalian, Liaoning province, which freezes over in winter.

The Huawei Ox Horn Campus in Dongguan also features twelve groups of buildings based on European cities or regions, including Heidelberg Castle, buildings of Český Krumlov, Verona, Bologna, Budapest, Tallinn, and Granada.

== See also ==
- Thames Town
- Europe Street
- Ju Jun
