= Thames Town =

Thames Town 泰晤士小镇
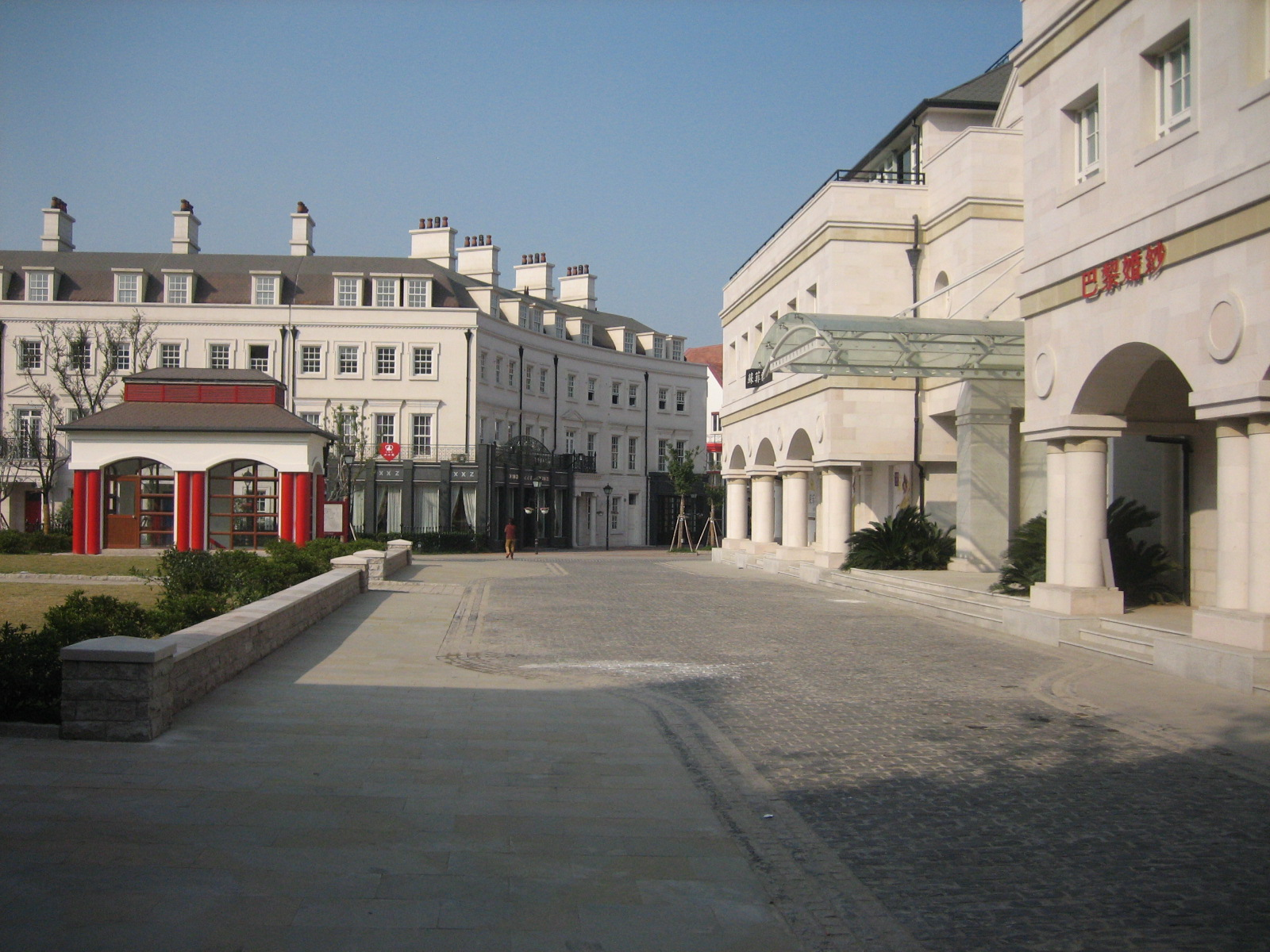

- Location in Shanghai
- Coordinates: 31.036°N 121.1905°E
- Country: People's Republic of China
- Municipality: Shanghai
- District: Songjiang

Population (2014)
  - Total: 2,300
- Time zone: UTC+8 (China Standard)

Thames Town (simplified Chinese: 泰晤士小镇; traditional Chinese: 泰晤士小鎮; pinyin: Tàiwùshì Xiǎozhèn) is a new town in Songjiang District, about 30 kilometres (19 mi) from central Shanghai. Completed in 2006, it is named after the River Thames, which flows through London, United Kingdom. The architecture is themed according to British market town styles. There are cobbled streets, Victorian terraces, corner shops and red telephone boxes. High house prices initially led to few permanent residents moving to the area, causing many of the shops and restaurants to close and the area to become known as a "ghost town".

== Location ==
Thames Town is a part of Songjiang New City, in Songjiang District. The town is 4 kilometres (2.5 mi) from the Songjiang New City station on Shanghai Metro Line 9. The G60 Shanghai–Kunming Expressway, formerly known as the Huhang Expressway, passes to its south.

While Songjiang District is an ancient prefecture which predates by far the establishment of Shanghai, Songjiang New City is a new development, intended to draw population away from central Shanghai. Within this city, one of the objectives for Thames Town was to provide accommodation for the staff of the new universities in adjacent Songjiang University Town.

== Development ==
These developments were a part of the One City, Nine Towns initiative, which was passed by the Shanghai Planning Commission in 2001. This initiative was the flagship urban development program for China's Tenth Five Year Plan (covering 2001-2005). The "one city" of this policy was Songjiang New City, where an English theme was used for Thames Town. The "nine towns" of the policy were each sited in one of the other suburban districts of Shanghai, and each was also given their own theme. Other Western themes used to date are Scandinavian (Luodian), Italian (Pujiang), Spanish (Fengcheng), Canadian (Fengjing), Dutch (Gaoqiao) and German (Anting).

The architectural firm of Atkins was given responsibility for planning Songjiang New City and designing Thames Town. The main developers for the town were Shanghai Songjiang New City Construction and Development, and Shanghai Henghe Real Estate.

Thames Town was completed in 2006, occupying an area of 1 square kilometre (0.39 sq mi) and designed for a population of 10,000. Some of the architecture has been directly copied from buildings found in England, including the church (modelled on Christ Church, Clifton Down in Bristol), a pub, and fish and chip shop (copied from buildings in Lyme Regis, Dorset), and Chester High Cross. It cost 5 billion yuan to construct, or $700 million.

=== Description ===
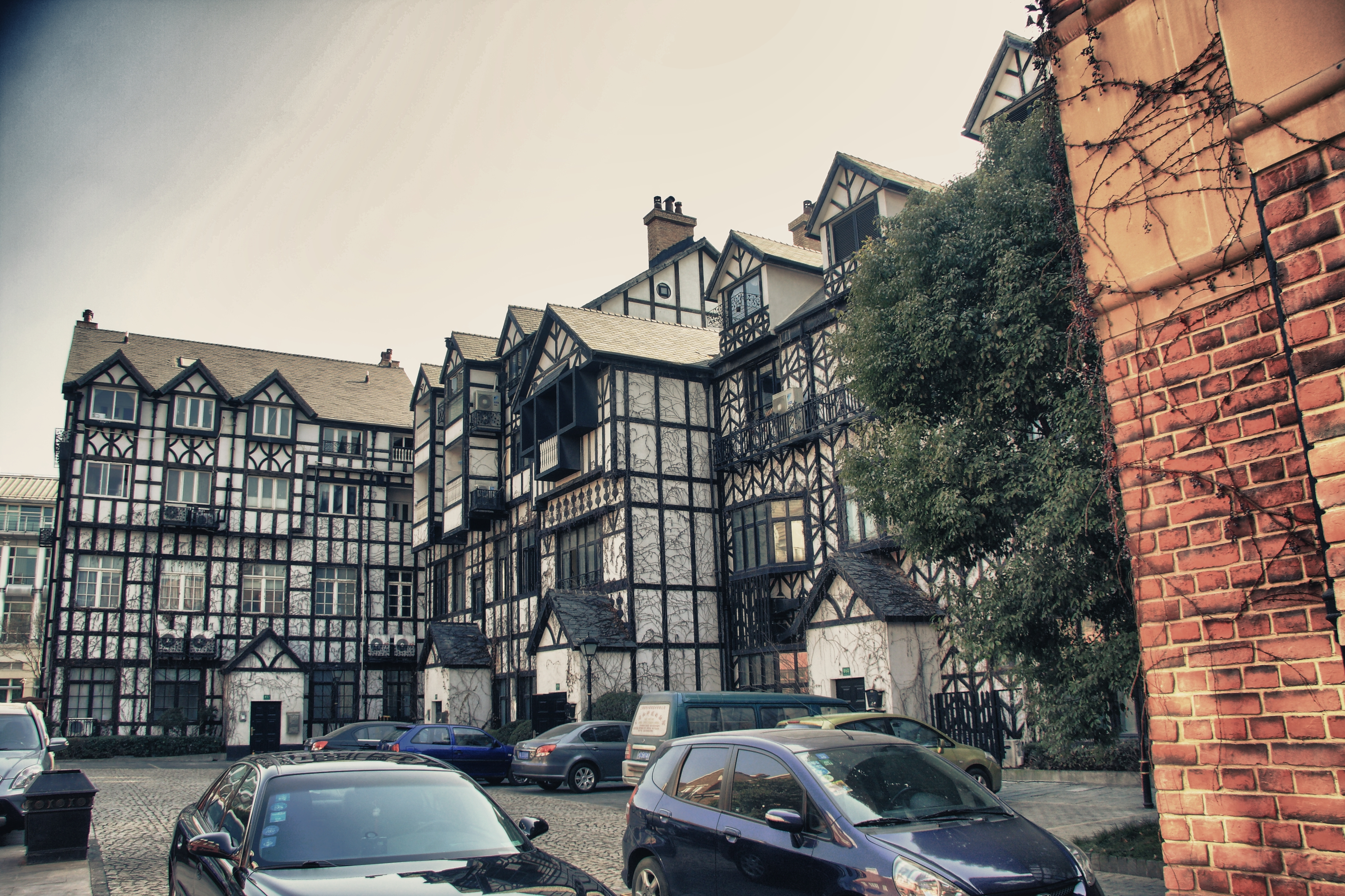
Mock Tudor buildings in Thames Town

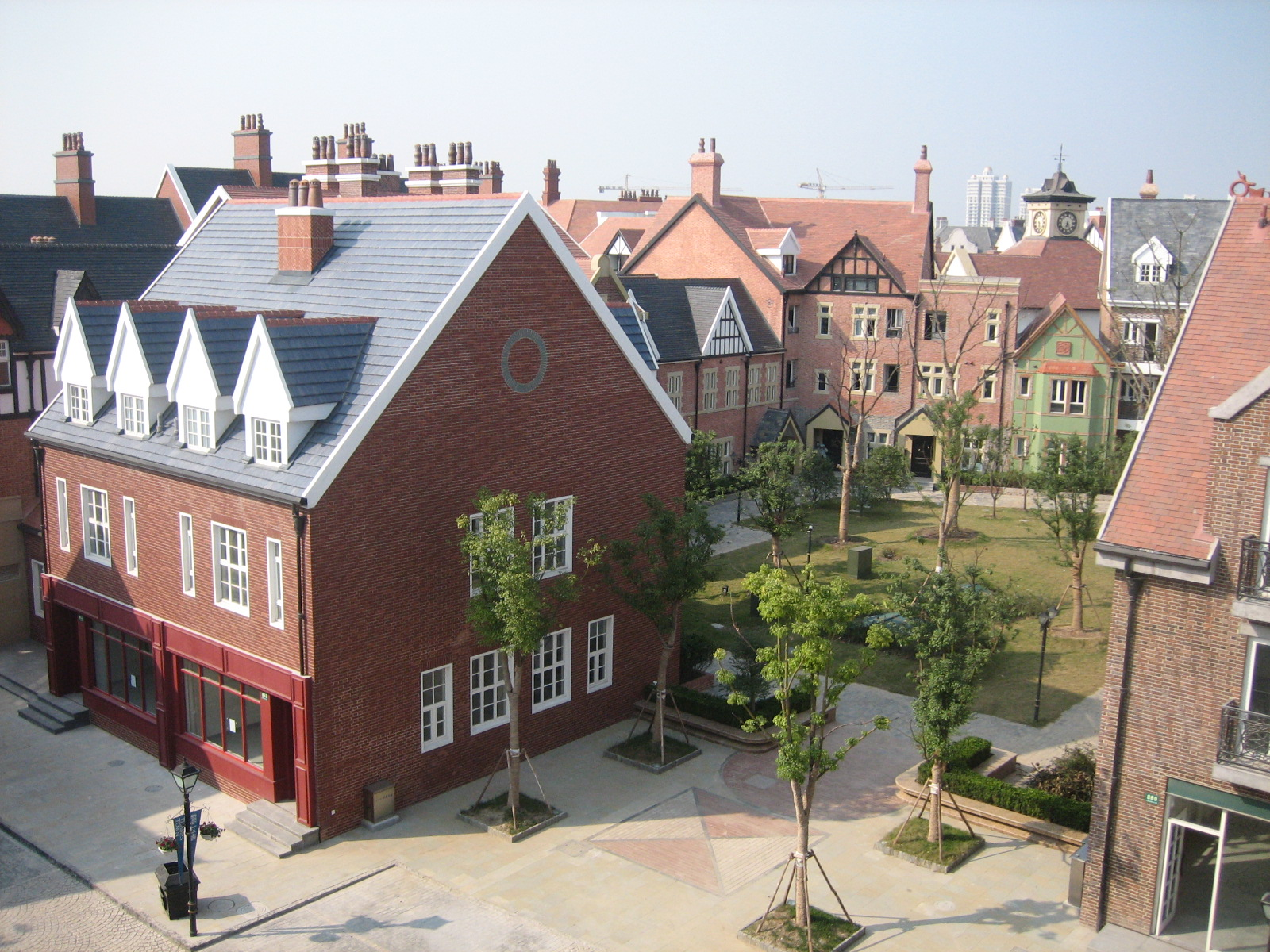
An imitation of English market town styles

The town consists mostly of low-density, single-family housing, with few commercial premises or community facilities. Although the houses sold rapidly, most purchases were by the relatively wealthy, as investments or second homes, and house prices rose to a high level. British architecture writer Jonathan Glancey described it as "a grotesque, and extremely funny parody of an olde English town seen through Chinese eyes, and built by canny British developers".

The proportion of owners taking up permanent residence was initially low, and Business Insider described it as a "virtual ghost town". Nevertheless, in 2012 a similar English-style town was being planned near Beijing. By 2016, the majority of stores and restaurants in Thames Town were empty.

Despite the initially low number of residents, the town became a popular location for wedding photography, with the church and main square often used as a backdrop.

In 2025, Thomas O'Malley of The Daily Telegraph visited the town and wrote that, while the commercial centre of the town was mainly used by tourists, the rest of town appeared to have principally become gated communities for commuters, saying that it was "in essence a cluster of upscale residential enclaves... it feels prosperous and private." The population that year was estimated as 2,500.

== See also ==
- Jackson Hole, China
- Europe Street
- Ju Jun – known as "Orange County, China"
- Hallstatt (China)
