= Baby fever =

Strong desire for a person to have a child

Baby fever is a strong, sudden desire for someone to have their own child. It is prevalent within several cultures and is prevalent among both women and men.
