= Robin Evans =

English architect, teacher and historian

Robin Evans (8 May 1944 – 19 February 1993) was an architect, teacher and historian. He grew up in Essex, England, attending British state schools where he met his wife, teacher Janet Bance - before studying Architecture at the Architectural Association School of Architecture (the AA), gaining his Diploma and the Bristol Prize (1969).

Evans studied the history of prison architecture for his doctorate. His essays and reviews were published in journals including Lotus, Casa Bella, Architectural Review and AA Files. He lectured at the Polytechnic of Central London, the Cambridge school of architecture, England, the AA, and the Bartlett School, University College London. Evans also lectured widely in the United States at Harvard, Columbia, Pennsylvania, Princeton, Massachusetts Institute of Technology (MIT), and Cornell.

Before his death he completed The Projective Cast: Architecture and Its Three Geometries (the MIT Press, 1995). A history of architecture from Early Renaissance to post-modernity. Evans' significant earlier work Translations from Drawing to Building became a 1996 posthumous publication from MIT Press. Evans writes about architectural concern for the meanings of space and matter, perception and imagination.

Since his death Evans' work is commemorated by leading academics through the annual Robin Evans Lecture
