= Tin Tins =

Defunct nightclub in Birmingham, England

Coordinates: 52.4767°N 1.8961°W

Tin Tins was an all-night Birmingham dance club until its closure in 1997. It influenced many contemporaneous and subsequent dance clubs. It was located in the current location of the Debenhams store in the Bullring Shopping Centre.

== Culture ==
Tin Tins was first founded as a gay club in 1990 by Brian Wigley and Martin Healey, also the owners of the drag cabaret bar Partners (now Glamorous). Tin Tins was originally managed by Stan Cherrington and Richard O'Donnell, who focused on a younger clientele. The Nightingale, the city’s only other gay club, was more popular with an older, predominantly male customer base.

During its formative years, Tin Tins primarily hosted musical acts, including Lonnie Gordon, Hazell Dean, Sharon Redd, the pop group Take That, and several celebrity personalities, including "The Freak" from Prisoner Cell Block H and Lily Savage. The venue also hosted DJ Funky Dunc, a member of the Hi-NRG scene.

When the early management team departed to open M&M's, a nearby gay bar, Tin Tins re-established itself under a new leadership team of Richard O'Donnell, David "Lotty" Nash, and Phil Oldershaw, who went on to manage the "new" Nightingale Club.

Richard O’Donnell became Tin Tin’s lead manager. Seeing value in the club’s all-night license, one of the only in the city, he launched an after-hours club called Hype. This move gave straight, “attitude-free” clubbers access, making Tin Tins an unusual example of a mixed gay/straight bar in the early nineties.

== Music ==
Tin Tins had two main music rooms: Upstairs, where uplifting house music was played; and Downstairs, which played harder house in the new Hi-NRG style. DJ Tony De Vit played downstairs in the club’s early days before taking residency at the Trade nightclub at Turnmills in London. DJ Paul Andrews, a long-term DJ and others, like Simon Baker and Dave Simmons, shaped the club’s music policy and scene.

At first, Tin Tins would close at 2 AM and reopen as Hype, going until either 6 or 8 AM. Shortly afterwards, the club's schedule changed to remain open from 10 PM to 9 AM with no break.

== Closure ==
The venue was demolished in 1997 as part of the Bullring development.
