= Heaven (nightclub) =

Gay club in London, England

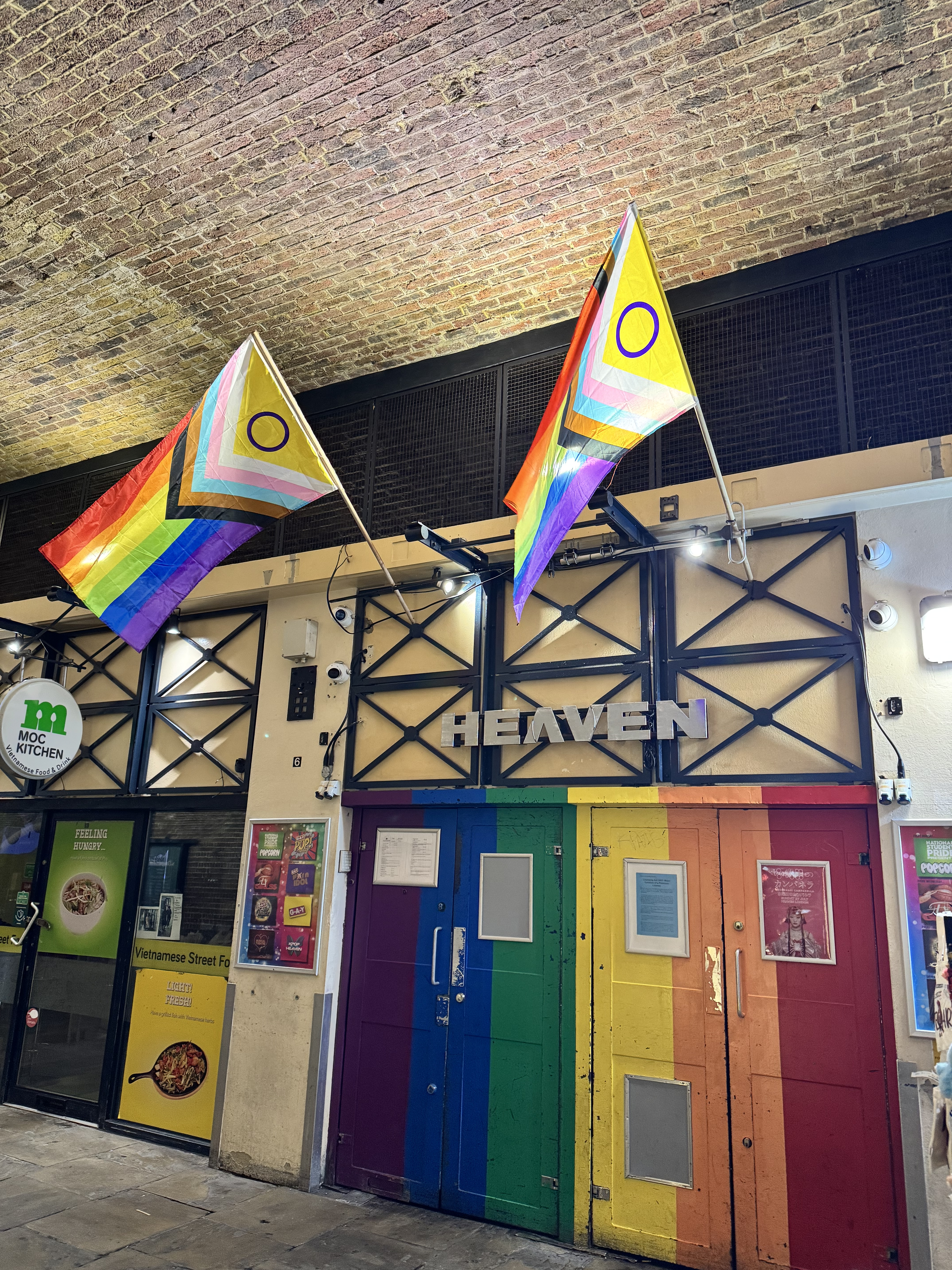
- The entrance to Heaven Nightclub in 2025.
- Interactive map of Heaven
- Location: Charing Cross, London, England
- Coordinates: 51.50808°N 0.12400°W
- Owner: Jeremy Joseph
- Capacity: 1,725
- Type: Night club

Construction
- Opened: 1979

Website
- g-a-yandheaven.co.uk

Heaven is a gay superclub in Charing Cross, London, England. It has played a central role and had a major influence in the development of London's LGBT scene for over 40 years and is home to long-running gay night G-A-Y. The club is known for Paul Oakenfold's acid house events in the 1980s, the underground nightclub festival Megatripolis, and for being the birthplace of ambient house.

Soundshaft also hosted Future, a regular night on Thursdays run by Paul Oakenfold. At the end of the night, both crowds would come together when the doors connecting Heaven and Future opened for the last couple of songs.

== History ==
=== Beginnings ===
Heaven was opened in December 1979 by Jeremy Norman in a former night club called Global Village, which was housed in the arches beneath Charing Cross railway station, once part of Adelphi Arches, a large wine-cellar for the hotel above. Norman was also chairman of Burke's Peerage, the publishers. The original hi-tech interior was designed by his partner, Derek Frost. Norman, an entrepreneur, had started an earlier club, The Embassy, in Old Bond Street in 1978. The Embassy proved to be successful and attracted a fashionable clientele; it is generally seen as the London equivalent of New York's Studio 54. Norman used his knowledge and experience of establishing and running a nightclub to create an entirely new kind of gay club on a larger scale. Heaven quickly established itself as the centre of the (then understated) gay London nightlife. Until it opened, most gay clubs were small hidden cellar-bars or pub discos. Heaven brought gay clubbing into the UK mainstream and gave London a club to rival New York's gay super club at the time, The Saint.

Heaven's first resident DJ was Ian Levine, who has been credited with being one of the first DJs in the UK of the now customary style of "beatmixing". His mix of Disco and Hi-NRG became what is known as the Original Heaven Sound.

Under the direction of the club's original manager David Inches and independent promotions manager Kevin Millins, Heaven sought DJs who would become exclusive to the club and were groundbreaking in terms of their music selection and style. Many Heaven DJs would go on to find greater acclaim in both the gay and mainstream music industry. Original Heaven DJs include Tony De Vit, Colin Holsgrove, Marc Andrews, Marc Monroe, George Mitchell, Ian D, Tallulah, Jon Dennis, Rich B, Wayne G, and Steve Whyte. Heaven also attracted legendary names from the United States such as house music pioneer Frankie Knuckles, who played at the Thursday night Delirium!

=== 1980s/1990s ===
In 1980, London Weekend Television ran a weekly documentary series titled Gay Life, in which Heaven nightclub and various other London gay clubs and bars were featured.

In 1982, Heaven was acquired from Norman by Richard Branson's Virgin Group. Branson was one of the first to identify the burgeoning 'pink pound' and saw the club as an investment opportunity. Branson reported in his autobiography that the £500,000 used to purchase Heaven came by the brewery supplying drinks to the venue.

Kevin Millins' club night Asylum (on Thursdays) started on 14 April 1983, with resident DJs Colin Faver and Mark Moore (S'Express). By 1985 this had become Pyramid (shifted to Wednesdays) and was one of the first clubs in the country to play emerging house music from Chicago.

As one of the first gay clubs in London, and one of the first openly so in the world, Heaven courted controversy, frequently appearing in the tabloid press, especially in The Sun headlines about ecstasy use in the nightclub in 1989.

In the late 1980s, Heaven would host two what would become legendary nights during the height of acid house, techno, and breakbeat hardcore rave culture. The first was Spectrum promoted by Paul Oakenfold and Ian St Paul, which ran on Monday nights between April 1988 and 1990, and the other was Kevin Millins' Rage, a Thursday night running between October 1988 and 1993 which included DJs Fabio & Grooverider, Colin Faver, and Trevor Fung. Oakenfold brought in Jimmy Cauty and Alex Paterson (The Orb) as ambient DJs for his "The Land of Oz" nights at Heaven, club nights which Dom Phillips in Mixmag called "seminal". These chillout sessions in "The White Room", also involving Youth, heralded the birth of ambient house. Cauty's other band, The KLF, made their premier live performance at the Land of Oz in July 1989.

Replacing Rage on Thursday from October 1993 until 1996 was Megatripolis, with Mixmaster Morris and regular guests such as Mr. C and Alex Paterson.

In the mid-1990s, Wednesday night was Fruit Machine, hosted by Miss Kimberly with a strong drag theme. Fridays were Garage playing techno and hardbag with DJs Blu Peter and Mrs Wood. Saturday nights were 'Heaven is Saturday – Saturday is Heaven' which hosted a variety of parties and weekly changing themes.

=== Soundshaft ===
Soundshaft was a small club attached to Heaven, which had a separate entrance on Hungerford Lane, behind Craven Street, although it was also accessible from the main club. Between 1988 and 1990 this hosted the seminal Troll night, and which launched the career of DJs Daz Saund and Luke Slater. It is now called The Stage Bar. In the late 1990s and early 2000s, the soundshaft was the Venue for Fahrenheit, a hard house event run by Fevah.

=== 1998 relaunch ===
In 1998, the club was refurbished and relaunched as a more mainstream venue to challenge increasingly popular clubs such as Trade and The Fridge. As part of this broadening appeal, a new Monday indie night called Room Two started alongside its more trademark night of Popcorn, which started on a Monday (and replaced Fridays Popstarz). To ensure the club stayed relevant, it also hosted nights from popular promoters such as Gatecrasher and Bedrock (on a Thursday night until 2005, with resident DJ John Digweed).

=== 2000s–2020s ===
At the beginning of the 2000s, Heaven adopted a more mainstream tribal house and disco-influenced sound, employing DJs such as Billy Gonzalez that had been resident at other major gay London nightclubs such as Trade and Salvation.

In 2003, Virgin sold the club to a consortium which comprised Paul Savory, David Inches, and Jeremy Millins (Pure Group).

Towards the mid-2000s, the music policy of its main room became more underground-oriented, with progressive, tech, and deep house on a Saturday night from resident DJs Pagano and Nick Tcherniak.

In 2017, the building was chosen as one of the Great Gay Buildings according to the BBC channel 4.

=== G-A-Y ===
On 22 September 2008, Heaven was purchased by the MAMA Group through its jointly owned subsidiary company G-A-Y Ltd. G-A-Y was a popular and long-running gay night hosted for many years at the London Astoria, and on Friday 3 October 2008, MAMA Group moved G-A-Y to Heaven. Little over a year later, MAMA Group itself was bought by music retailer HMV.

When HMV went into administration in 2013, Jeremy Joseph founder of G-A-Y acquired the outstanding shares in G-A-Y Ltd, and along with it Heaven.

=== Asset of community value ===
Heaven was granted asset of community value status in January 2020.

=== Coronavirus pandemic ===
Nightclubs across England, including Heaven, were closed for much of the coronavirus pandemic. When it was announced on 14 July 2021 by Prime Minister Boris Johnson that all remaining coronavirus restrictions would be lifted on 19 July, Heaven launched a digital clock counting down the hours until nightclubs could reopen. Footage of revellers queuing for Heaven and dancing inside the nightclub to celebrate the final lifting of restrictions in England gained worldwide media attention.

On Sunday 8 August, Heaven opened up between midday and 9pm as a vaccination drop-in centre, offering first doses of Pfizer vaccines and second doses of AstraZeneca vaccines without appointment.

=== Capacity increase and accessibility improvements ===
Alongside the announcement of the permanent closure of sister venue G-A-Y Late by owner Jeremy Joseph in November 2023, it was announced that Heaven was to undergo interior works.

Joseph announced that Heaven would be opening on Wednesday nights to host the new 'Mood' events, and it would be operating under an increased capacity of 1,725 with a promise of wheelchair accessibility after approval by Westminster City Council.

Joseph announced his intention to continue and recreate an "updated version" of the G-A-Y Late atmosphere at Heaven, intending to open some rooms in the club on further nights to do so.

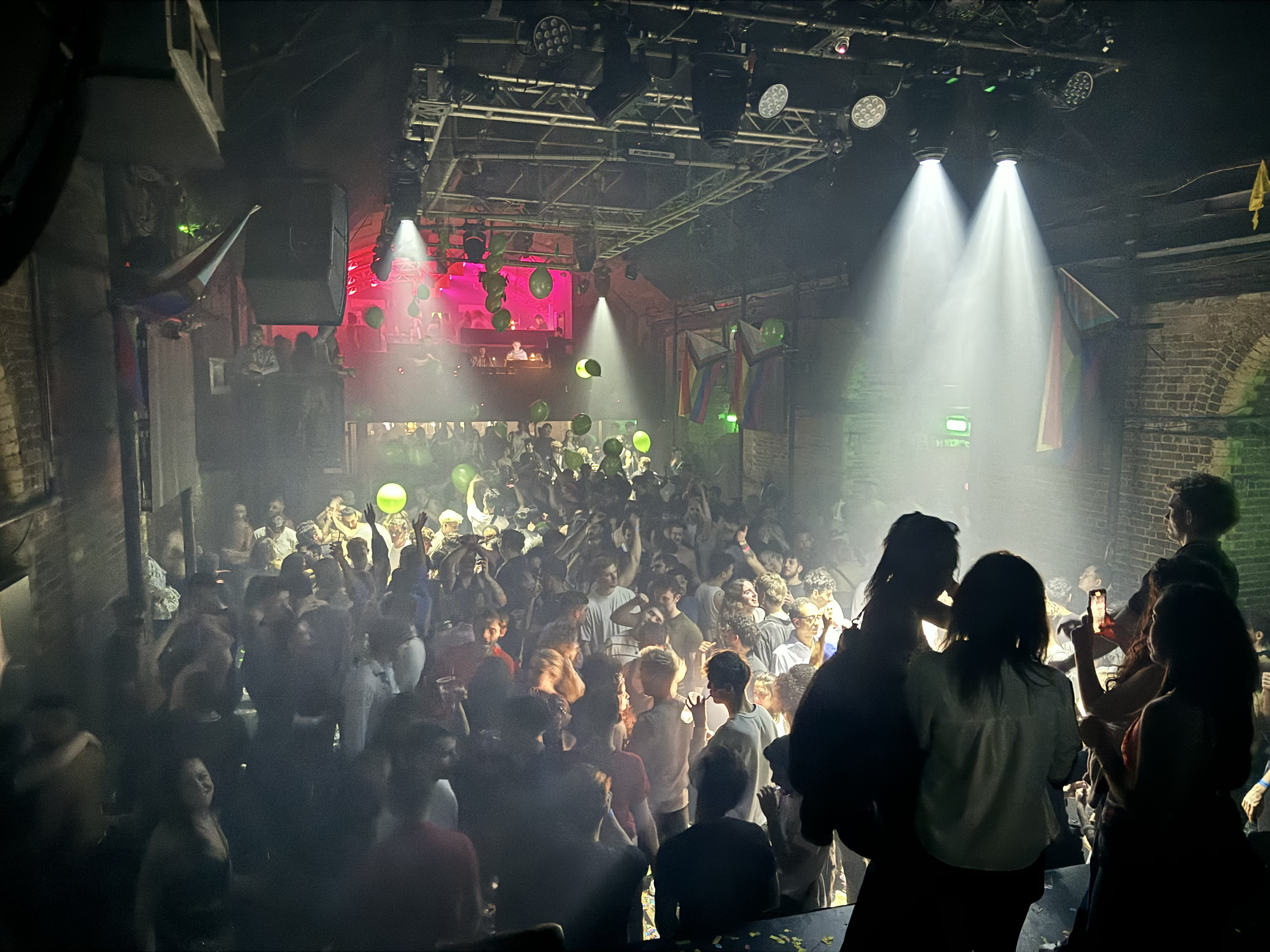
Heaven on a Saturday in 2023, taken from the main stage

=== 2024 closure and licensing hearing ===
On 11 November 2024, a member of Heaven security staff was charged with rape after an incident on Halloween night. The Metropolitan Police instigated a Summary Review of the Premises Licence under section 53A of the Licensing Act 2003 on the grounds that the premises was "associated with serious crime", and as an interim step on 15 November, Westminster City Council's licensing committee suspended Heaven's licence for 28 days.

Heaven challenged the interim suspension and, after a second contested hearing, the Council again determined the licence should remain suspended pending the full review.

After a public outcry and representations from members of the public, both for and against Heaven, including a mass open letter signed by 1,100 individuals (including Ruth Jones) in support of the venue, a full licensing hearing took place on 6 December. The Council considered the interaction between the Licensing Act 2003 and Public Sector Equality Duty created by section 149 of the Equality Act 2010. A series of new licence conditions were then agreed between Heaven, the police, and the council, and the venue was allowed to reopen.

=== Reopening and new developments ===
On 7 December 2024, Heaven reopened after being closed for almost a calendar month. An entirely new security company was employed, and new licensing conditions were installed.

Since the reopening, the club has become a seven-night-a-week venue, now opening on Sundays and Tuesdays with themed nights and events changing regularly.

In May 2025, the member of security staff charged with rape and attempted rape after an incident that closed the venue in December 2024 was found not guilty at Southwark Crown Court after a unanimous jury verdict.

=== Closure of G-A-Y bar and future ===
After being up for sale since earlier in the year, on 1 October 2025 Jeremy Joseph announced via Instagram that Heaven's sister venue, G-A-Y Bar, would be permanently closing due to financial pressures and stating "Old Compton Street has lost that LGBT identity". G-A-Y Bar closed its doors on 5 October 2025, with Joseph focusing on the future of Heaven, despite a rental increase.

In September 2026, the venue was given special protected status by Westminster City Council.

== Today ==
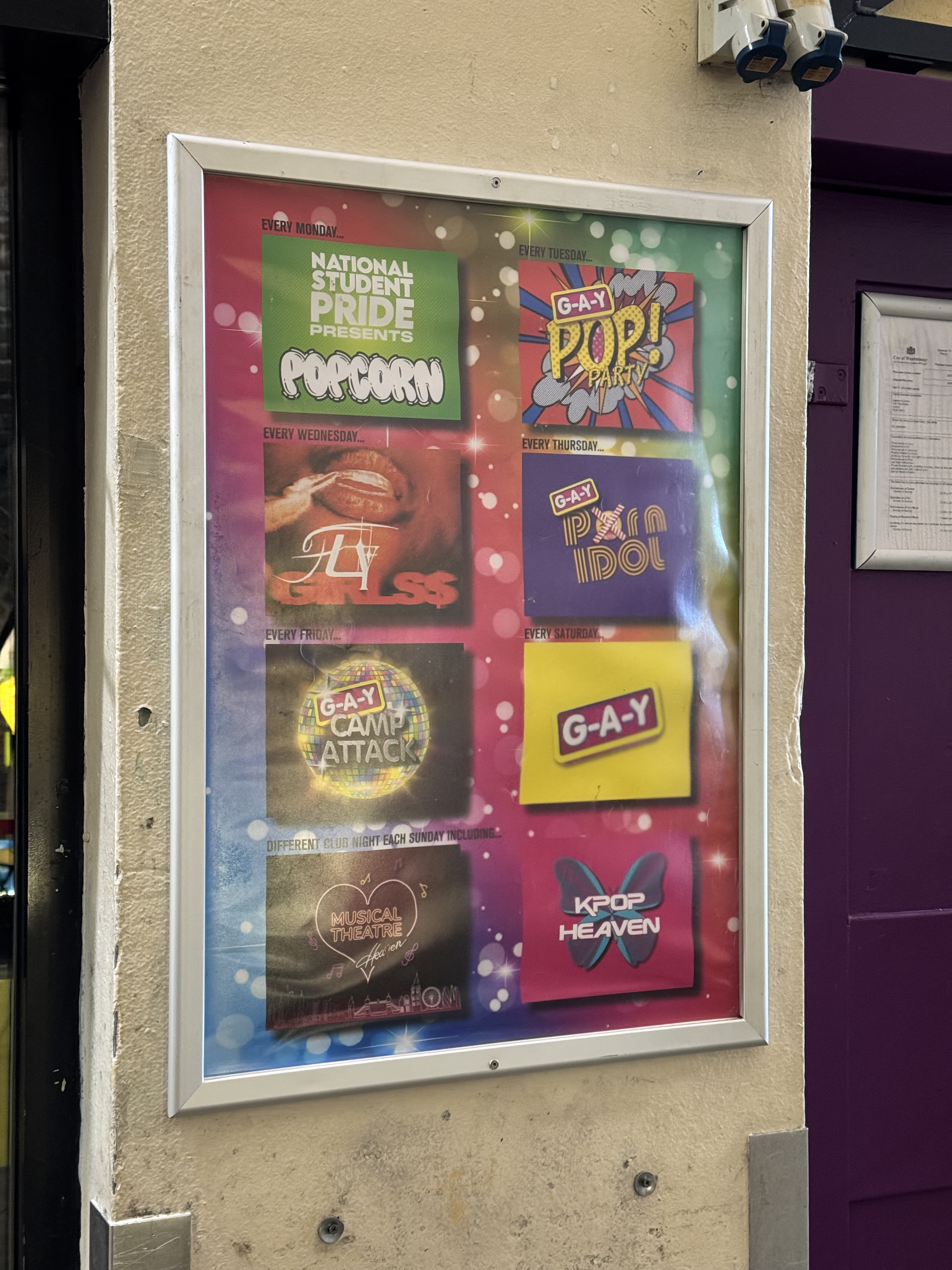
A poster outside Heaven in July 2025 listing all weekly events.

=== Monday ===
Monday continues to play host to Popcorn, a student night which plays pop and funky house music. It is currently operated by National Student Pride as a predominantly gay event, frequently hosting drag performances and competitions by local resident drag queens.

=== Tuesday ===
From June 2025, Heaven announced 'G-A-Y Pure Pop Party' nights regularly on Tuesdays, featuring music from pop artists including Charli XCX, Beyonce, and Lady Gaga.

=== Wednesday ===
'FLY GIRLS$' nights on Wednesdays were announced from June 2025 and are to consist of amapiano, baile funk, afrobeat and RnB music. The pro-trans branded nights are to be every Wednesday from 10:30pm until 04:00am and feature resident and guest DJs.

=== Thursday ===
Thursday plays host to 'G-A-Y Porn Idol', a regular strip competition for men and women previously held at the Astoria, with a cash prize offered to the winner each week. The club's two resident drag queen judges are accompanied by a guest judge (frequently from a RuPaul's Drag Race franchise), who then usually performs on the following Saturday.

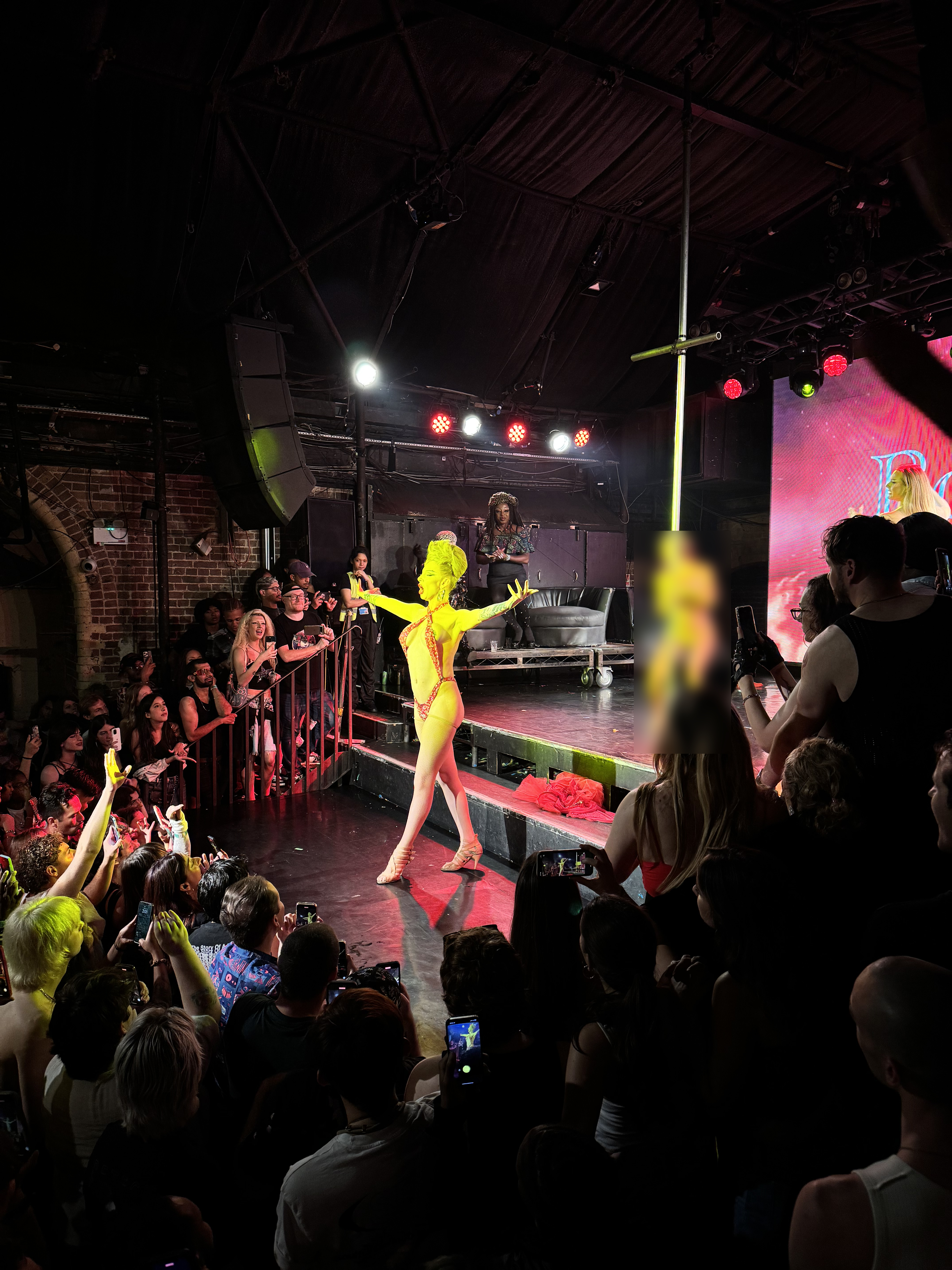
Bosco performing at Heaven's G-A-Y Porn Idol on 24 July 2025.

Winning contestants have been offered the chance to 'gamble' their cash for a higher prize, dependent on the ability of the guest judge to complete a challenge. The competition previously consisted of several rounds, with £1,000 awarded to the 'season winner'. It is preceded and followed by multiple rooms of pop music.

=== Friday ===
Friday plays host to 'Camp Attack', a long-running night from the days at the London Astoria.

=== Saturday ===
Saturday night 'G-A-Y' events continue to mostly feature a live performance from a prominent member of the international drag community, frequently a contestant from the RuPaul's Drag Race franchise, along with multiple rooms of pop, RnB and dance music.

=== Sunday ===
Sunday nights rotate themed events across genres, and have in 2025 included 'KPOP Heaven', a night dedicated to commercial K-pop, C-pop, J-pop and EDM music, as well as 'Musical Theatre Heaven' which plays host to one room of musical theatre numbers and remixes.

== Past performers ==
Heaven often features live performances by notable artists. These have included, but are not limited to (in alphabetical order):

- Big Bang
- Bronski Beat
- Chappell Roan
- Cher
- Fall Out Boy
- Kylie Minogue
- Lady Gaga
- Madonna
- Melanie Martinez
- Nessa Barrett
- New Order
- The Birthday Party
- Throbbing Gristle
- Tulisa

== Heaven worldwide ==
The Heaven name has been franchised over the years to ventures in Gran Canaria and Ibiza.

== See also ==
- G-A-Y
- List of electronic dance music venues
- List of LGBTQ bars
