= Eve Gallagher =

English singer

Eve Gallagher is an English singer from Sunderland, Tyne and Wear associated with the house music scene.

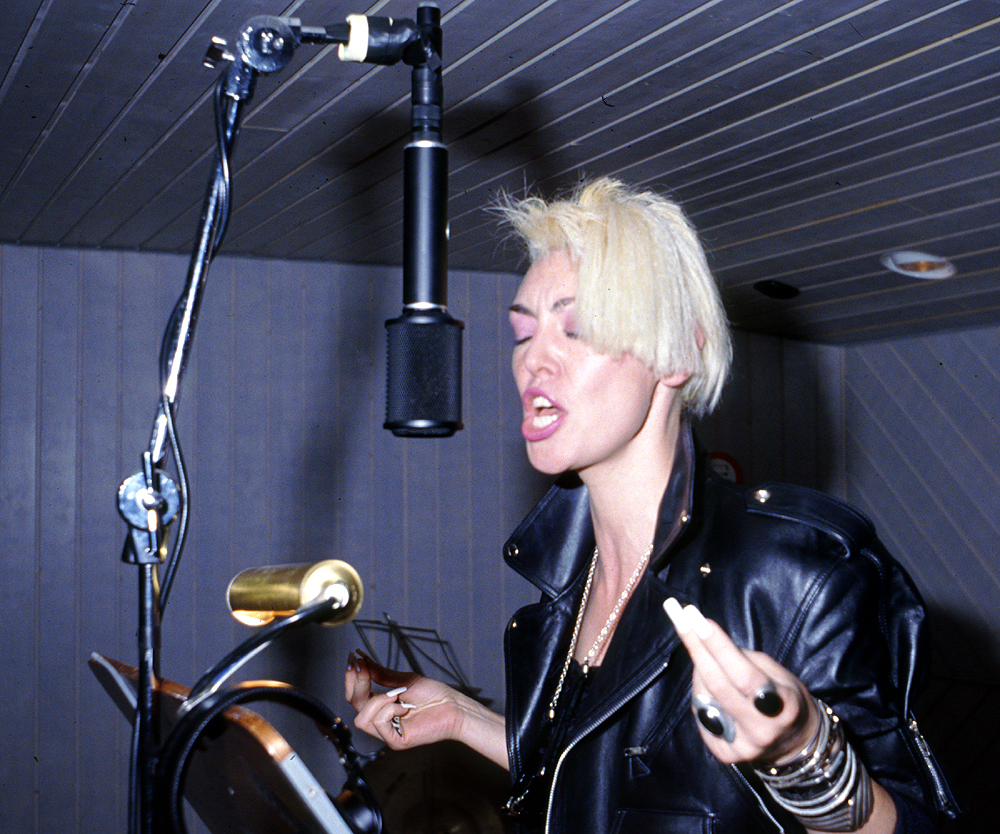
Eve Gallagher (1988)

== Career ==
Eve Gallagher first came to prominence in 1990 with the release of her debut single "Love Come Down". Released on Boy George's More Protein record label, it was a transatlantic club success featuring remixes from David Morales.

Her second single was "Love is a Master of Disguise", produced and mixed by DMC's Steve Anderson, of Brothers In Rhythm. A third release, "Heaven Has To Wait" ensued in early 1992, to be followed by "Change Your Mind". A remix of the latter track by Hooj Choons' in-house remix team Diss-Cuss proved to be an underground hit.

In 1995 "Love Come Down" was released in the US featuring new mixes from Evolution to complement the original David Morales version. The track was subsequently re-issued in the UK on Cleveland City, featuring additional mixes by Cow & Gate and T-Empo.

Gallagher's biggest club and chart success arrived in late 1995 with the house and hardbag anthem "You Can Have It All". Two distinct versions were featured on the release - the 'Rhyme Time' mix with the Germanic trance variation by Ramp.

Following the success of "Love Come Down 95" and "You Can Have It All", Gallagher's debut album Woman Can Have It was released in the UK and the US in 1996. Produced by Boy George, Amos Pizzey and Evolution, it featured variations of older singles such as "Heaven Has To Wait" and "Change Your Mind" as well as newer material.

In July 1996 "Heartbreak" was released by Mrs Wood featuring Eve Gallagher. The track was playlisted by BBC Radio 1.

In 2002 Gallagher also co-wrote and sang the dance hit "Take It or Leave It" for DJ Antoine.

In 2007 she was asked, alongside singers like Glenn Hughes, John Lawton and Jørn Lande, to sing the ballad "Think Twice" on Ken Hensley's latest album Blood On The Highway, an autobiographical account of his life as a member of Uriah Heep. A DVD is available of the live performance of the Blood On The Highway showcase which took place in Hamburg. Gallagher is currently working on a new album, produced and written by her husband Yves Poli with Uli Heinzler. Her new project is called "Galacteve" together with Poli and Heinzler, a live band set up which mixes a fusion of house, electronica and rock. See www.galacteve.com

In 2022 Cleveland City Records Re-Release their hit classic Eve Gallagher - You Can Have It All, with brand new remixes from Danny Mr Jay/Paul Orwin/PhunkAgenda. Since 2021 Eve Gallagher performs with her Band Eve Gallagher Band

== Discography ==
=== Albums ===
- Woman Can Have It (Cleveland City UK/Radikal U.S.)
- STRAY (galacteve/Bellaphon International Germany)
- Roots Eve Gallagher Band

=== Singles ===
- November 1990 "Love Come Down" (UK #61)
- May 1991 "Love Is A Master Of Disguise" (US Hot Dance Club Play #19)
- January 1992 "Heaven Has To Wait"
- March 1994 "Change Your Mind" (UK #78)
- April 1995 "You Can Have It All" (UK #43)
- October 1995 "Love Come Down" (re-recording) (UK #57, US Hot Dance Club Play #40)
- June 1996 "Heartbreak" (Mrs Wood featuring Eve Gallagher) (UK #44)
- September 1996 "Last Night" (UK #171)
- January 2016 "Walk the Streets" (Adrian Martin featuring Eve Gallagher)
- November 2022 Lovin`you again with Uli Heinzler
- July 2025 Freedom with Uli Heinzler
- January 2026 Getting Old with Uli Heinzler
