= Turnmill Street =

Street in Clerkenwell, London

Coordinates: 51.5210°N 0.1050°W

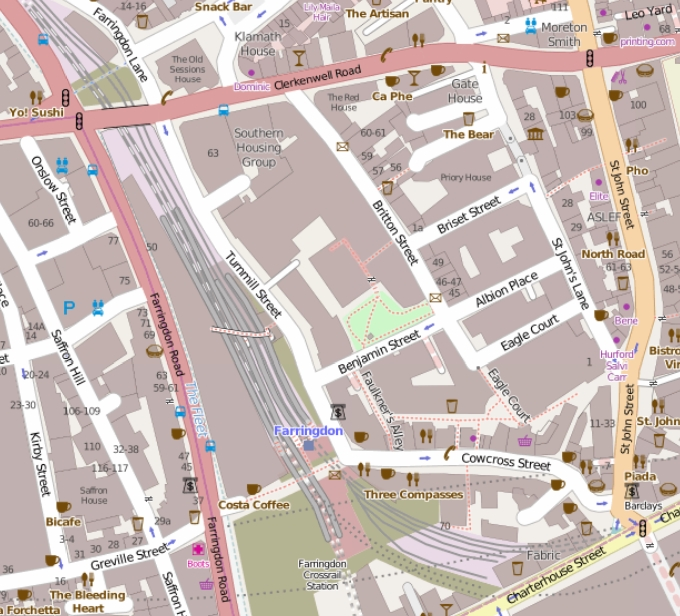
The immediate vicinity of Turnmill Street

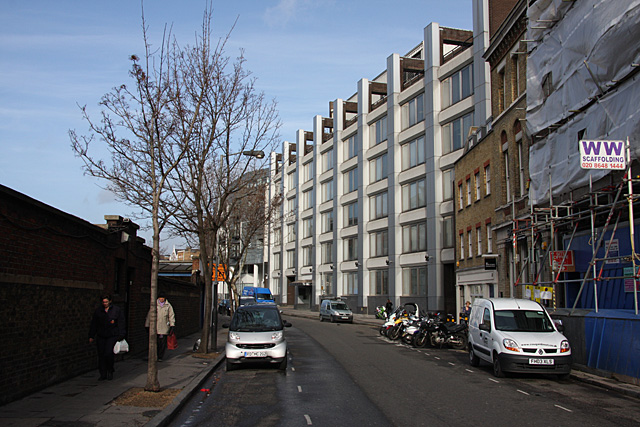
Turnmill Street

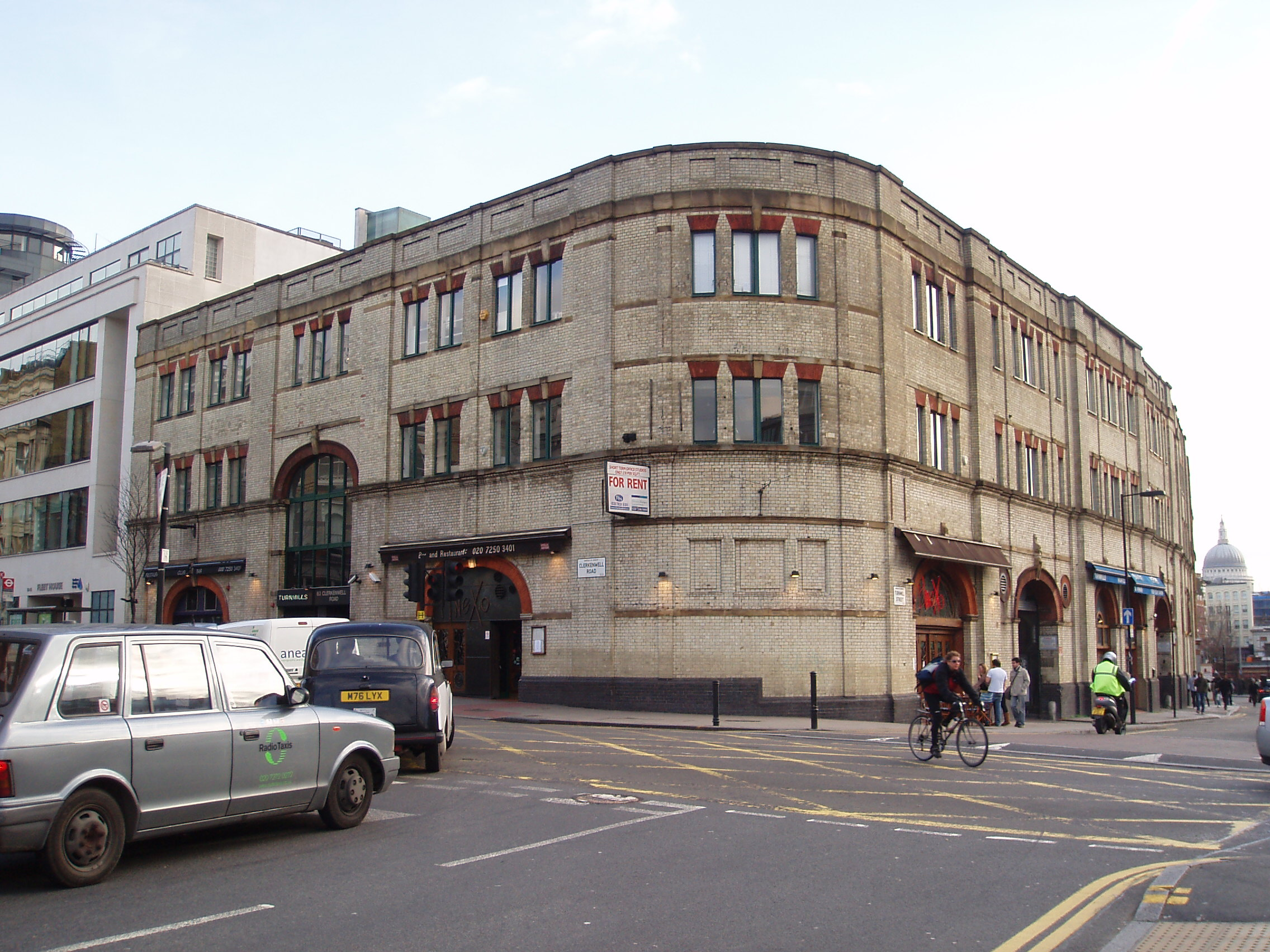
Turnmills nightclub

Turnmill Street is a street in Clerkenwell, London. It runs north–south from Clerkenwell Road in the north, to Cowcross Street in the south. One of the oldest streets in London, it has been variously known as Turnmill and Turnbull Street over its history. During the Elizabethan era, under the name Turnbull Street it became "the most disreputable street in London", notorious as a centre of crime and prostitution.

== Origins ==
It is mentioned in a 14th-century document under the name Trylmyl Street. According to John Stow it took the name "Turnmill" because it was close to the River Fleet, along which a number of mills were placed. The Turnmill Brook was an early name for the Fleet, or at least the local part of it. The antiquarian John Timbs wrote that, "It was long vulgarly called Turnbull and Trunball Street."

== Elizabethan Turnbull Street ==
In the Elizabethan era the street became a byword for depravity, and it is regularly referred to in the works of playwrights of the era. The area became a warren of dark alleys and interlinked courtyards. Shakespeare mentions it in Henry IV, Part 2, when Falstaff ridicules Justice Shallow for prating about "the wildness of his youth, and the feats he hath done about Turnbull Street". Ben Jonson also mentions it in Bartholomew Fair in which the "pig woman" Ursula complains that one of the other characters was spreading a rumour that "I was dead, in Turnbull-street, of a surfeit of bottle-ale, and tripes". Likewise in Francis Beaumont's The Knight of the Burning Pestle a character says he fell in love with a woman and "stole her from her friends in Turnbull Street", the implication being that he took her from a brothel in which she was working. In Beaumont and Fletcher's The Scornful Lady a character complains that the "drinking, swearing and whoring" that has been going on means "we have all lived in a perpetual Turnbull Street".

Much of the area around the street later became known as "Jack Ketch's Warren," because so many people there ended up being hanged (Jack Ketch was a generic name for a hangman).

== Modern Turnmill Street ==
The slums and warrens linked to the street were cleared out in the Victorian era, partly because of demolitions required by the creation of the Metropolitan Railway, and partly because of the building of the new Clerkenwell Road, which was specifically designed to "break up the slums of Clerkenwell, especially those courts and alleys east of Turnmill street".

Farringdon station has its northern entrance on Turnmill Street, although it main entrance is on Cowcross Street.

The nightclub Turnmills, which opened in 1985 on the corner of Turnmill Street and Clerkenwell Road, was the first in the UK to obtain a 24-hour dance licence, and arguably spearheaded the growth of all-night clubbing in the 1990s. It closed on 24 March 2008, due to the expiry of its lease. In 2011 permission was given to demolish the 1886 building, formerly a Great Northern Railway Company warehouse, and to replace it with a six-storey office block, by the property development company Derwent London. In 2014 it was announced that Saatchi & Saatchi were to be moving into the building.
