= The Garage (London) =

Music venue in London, England

Coordinates: 51°32′48″N 0°6′14″W

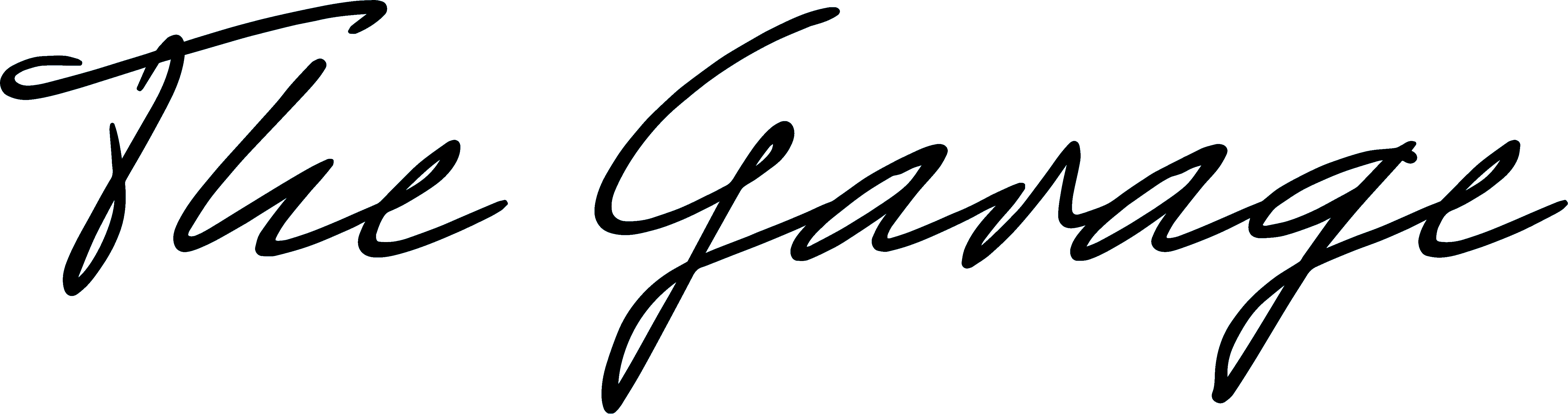

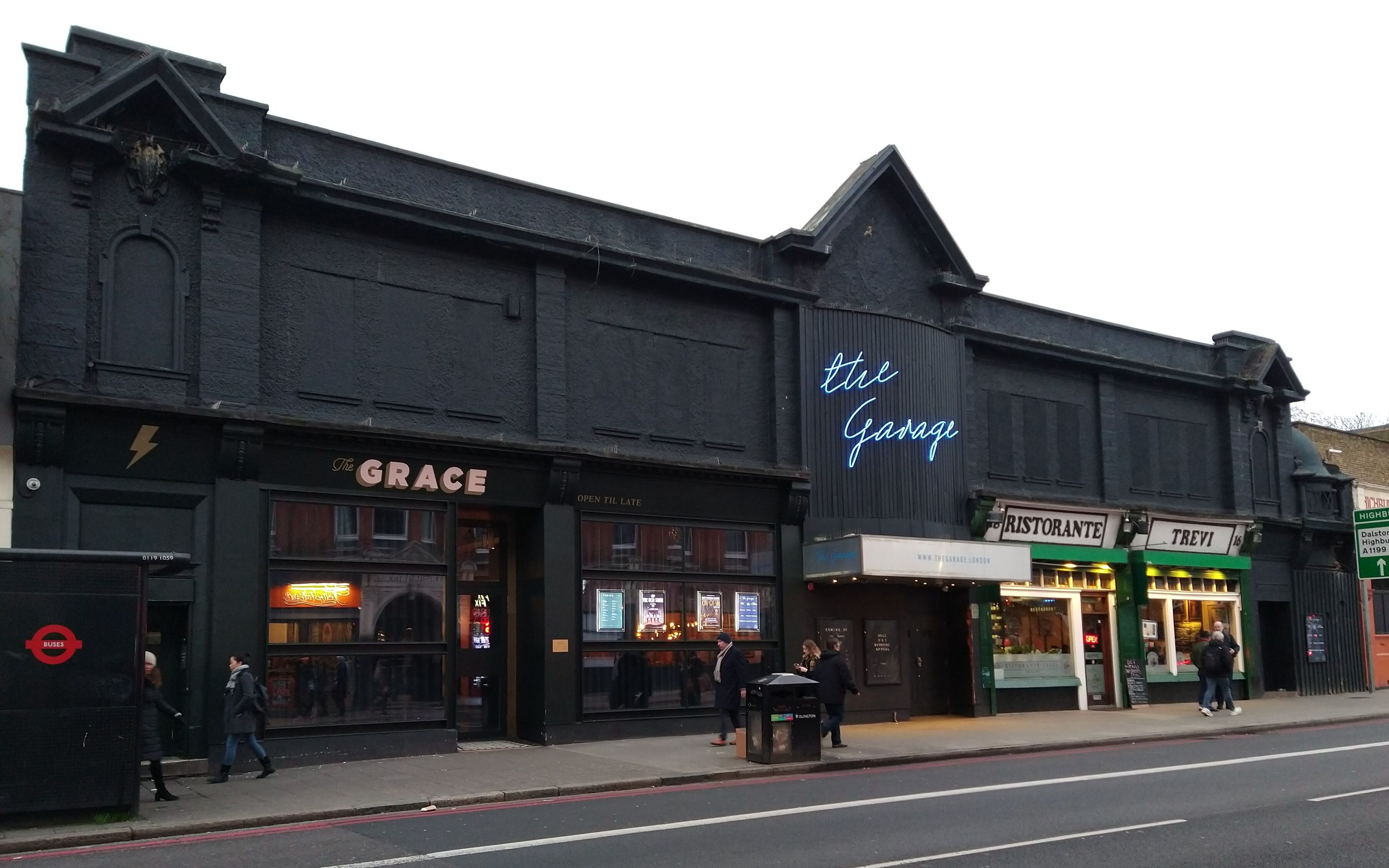
- The venue in 2020
- Interactive map of The Garage
- Location: 20-22 Highbury Corner; Highbury; London, N5; England
- Owner: DHP Family
- Type: Music venue
- Events: Rock, metal, hip hop, pop
- Public transit: Highbury & Islington

Construction
- Opened: 1993; 33 years ago

Website
- thegarage.london

The Garage is a live music and club venue in Highbury, North London. It opened in 1993 and has a capacity of 600. The upstairs room, also known as the Grace, has a capacity of 150.

The venue has hosted a number of underplays, with the Killers, Jack White, Mumford & Sons, Suede, Wolf Alice, Sugababes, The 1975 and Lambrini Girls being among some of the most recent and upcoming acts to play the venue. Other acts who have passed through the doors include Green Day, Muse, Arctic Monkeys, Franz Ferdinand, Red Hot Chili Peppers, Paramore, Oasis, My Chemical Romance and the Creatures (Siouxsie Sioux's second band).

The Garage was originally a Temperance Billiard Hall which quickly gained a reputation for serving great pies, as well as being a haunt for local villains in the sixties. The Highbury Mob often used the Billiard Hall as a meeting place. It became the London Town & Country Club 2, a sister venue to the Town and Country Club (now the Forum in Kentish Town), which is when the first live music events began to be programmed in the building.

In 1993, the building was officially reopened as the Garage with Pulp being the first big name to play the venue in May 1993. The venue was renamed the Garage by Mean Fiddler, after the Lex Garage which was once next door. In 2007 it was taken over by MAMA & Company. Jazz Cafe and The Borderline were also included in the acquisition, incorporating them in to the MAMA Group's estate from August.

In June 2009, the Garage was relaunched as the Relentless Garage with joint naming rights with Relentless Energy Drinks.It was taken over by DHP Family in 2016. This led to a complete revamp of the whole venue in March 2017 to create an all day bar as well as an intimate 150 capacity venue, The Grace, upstairs. A new layout, bar, sound and lighting system for the Garage was also added.

The Garage has had acts such as Harry Styles, Jack White, Alt-J, Mystery Jets, Rina Sawayama, Jax Jones, Tory Lanez, the Rifles and War Child’s 25th anniversary shows in performance.
