= Daz Saund =

British DJ

- Genres: House; Techno; Hard house Hard trance Hard NRG
- Occupations: Remixer, DJ
- Years active: 1988-current
- Labels: Positiva; Musicman; Missile Records, Moonshine
- Website: http://www.myspace.com/djdazsaund

Daz Saund is a British club DJ and Remixer from London, England.

== Career ==
After getting his big break at the seminal Troll Nites at the Sound Shaft, Heaven, London in the late 1980s, Daz Saund then progressed to become resident DJ at the Garage at Heaven nightclub. He then spent three years (1990–93) performing at the Trade at Turnmills and was one of the original DJs, where he made his mark as one of Britain's leading Techno artists. Daz's reputation rapidly spread throughout the UK, Europe and the Far East, playing at events such as Love Parade, Mayday and Tribal Gathering in the UK. In 1995 Daz was voted Best International DJ of the year by Front Page Magazine, he remains at the forefront of today's techno dance music scene.

Daz first ventured into the remix and production world in 1992 with a remix of 'Lets Rock'. He has worked with Trevor Rockcliffe under the guise of Black & Brown producing several singles, including 'Lick it'.

Since 1996 he has collaborated extensively with Ben Tisdall as Sound Associates, producing for labels such as Music Man Belgium, Tortured Records and Missile Records in the UK. He has recently been working on his own material due out on Eukatech Records.

At the start of 2000, Daz returned to one of his favorite venues Turnmills, this time with a Sunday night residency nite called Habit where he played a blend of funky techno-dance music.

Daz has also launched on his own new record label "Resident Records" together with Richard Dearlove, otherwise known as Diddy, who produced the single "Give me love", on Positiva Records.

He also played at Fabric (club) in London on the DTPM nights and travels around Europe, and recently co-hosts the Megawoof events.
