= MAMA Festivals =

Live music and lifestyle entertainment company

MAMA Festivals Limited
- Type: Private, Subsidiary
- Industry: Entertainment
- Founded: 2005
- Headquarters: London, England, UK
- Number of locations: 9 venues (2014)
- Area served: UK
- Key people: Adam Driscoll, Dean James (co-founders) Rory Bett (CEO); Kirsty Mcshannon, COO
- Products: Concerts
- Owner: LN-Gaiety Holdings Ltd
- Divisions: Venues; Festivals & Events; Supporting Services
- Subsidiaries: Hoxton Square Bar and Kitchen; The Forum; The Institute; The Garage; The Ritz; The Arts Club; The Great Escape Festival; Lovebox Festival; Somersault Festival; Wilderness Festival; Global Gathering; Godskitchen; Eclectricity
- Website: www.mamafestivals.com

MAMA Festivals is a live music and entertainment company which owns and operates a number of live music venues and festivals in the United Kingdom. Founded in 2005, it has acquired many other venue-holding companies, expanding its reach significantly across England.

The company owns six London venues and three regional venues: Hoxton Square Bar and Kitchen, The Forum in Kentish Town, The Garage in Islington, The Institute in Birmingham, The Ritz in Manchester, and The Arts Club in Liverpool. The venues range in capacity from 300 to 2,300.

In addition, MAMA operates several festivals and events, including Lovebox (London), Wilderness (Oxfordshire), The Great Escape (Brighton), Somersault (North Devon), Global Gathering (Stratford-upon-Avon), Godskitchen, and Future Gods events.

== History ==
MAMA was founded by Adam Driscoll and Dean James in 2005 via the reverse takeover of Campus Media by Stonesthrow Media (Channelfly Group). The newly re-branded MAMA Group was admitted to AIM in December 2005. MAMA stands for Music and Media Assets. On 11 June 2007, the company purchased the Hammersmith Apollo and The Forum. The same year, MAMA Group acquired Mean Fiddler Holdings Limited the company which owned The Jazz Café, The Garage, The Borderline, and held a majority share in G-A-Y.

On 6 March 2008, the group acquired The Picture House, Edinburgh from Luminar Liquid Limited, a subsidiary of Luminar Group Holdings plc. On 1 April 2008, MAMA acquired The institute, Birmingham and on 13 June 2008, they acquired a majority share in Global Gathering Group Limited (formerly Angel Music Group Limited), the company which owns GlobalGathering, Godskitchen, and Future Gods brands. MAMA acquired 100% of Global Gathering Group Limited in 2011.

On 22 September 2008, MAMA Group acquired Heaven (London) Limited, the company which owns the leasehold of the Heaven Nightclub.

On 15 January 2009, HMV Group purchased a 50 percent stake in MAMA Group. The new company, Mean Fiddler Group Limited, operated 11 venues across the United Kingdom, including the Hammersmith Apollo, The Forum in Kentish Town, The Garage, Jazz Café, The Edinburgh Picture House, Digbeth Institute in Birmingham, Heaven, G-A-Y Bar, G-A-Y Late, The Borderline, and Aberdeen's Moshulu. In January 2010, HMV bought the whole of the MAMA Group in a deal worth £46m.

HMV sold the Hammersmith Apollo to AEG Live and Eventim UK in May 2012 for £32 million. It sold the remainder of MAMA & Company to management backed by Lloyds Development Capital in December 2012 for £7.3 million, which also included the company's 50% stake in Mean Fiddler Group (excluding Heaven and the G-A-Y businesses).

March 2013, MAMA acquired East Village Arts Club (formerly The Masque), Liverpool on 5 February 2013 and Hoxton Square Bar and Kitchen.

In 2015, MAMA was acquired by LN-Gaiety, a joint venture of Live Nation UK and the parent company of MCD Productions. Three MAMA venues, the Ritz in Manchester, the Forum in Kentish Town and the Institute in Birmingham, would be rebranded by Live Nation as the O2 Ritz Manchester, O2 Forum Kentish Town, and O2 Institute Birmingham respectively.
