= Aba Shanti-I =

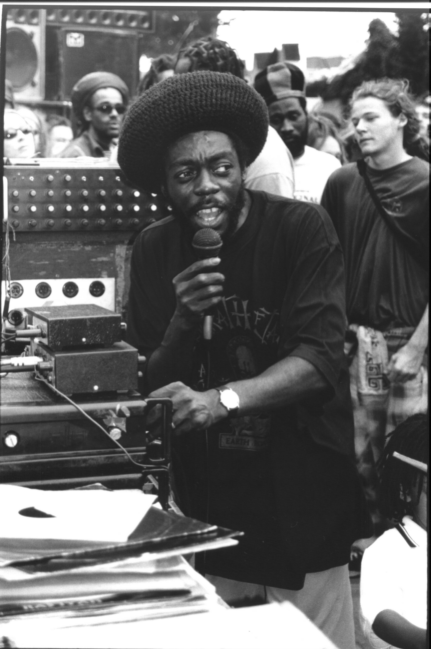
- Aba Shanti-I at the Notting Hill Carnival

Background information
- Also known as: Jasmine Joe
- Born: Joseph Smith; Hackney, London, UK
- Genres: Reggae, roots reggae, dub
- Occupations: DJ, sound system operator
- Label: Falasha
- Website: falasha-recordings.co.uk

Aba Shanti-I (born Joseph Smith) is a sound system operator and dub producer from the UK. Aba and his sound system have been playing through UK and Europe for over 30 years. He has been a resident sound system at Notting Hill Carnival since 1993 and was voted the No. 1 DJ in the World by DJ Magazine in the same year.

== Early life ==
Joseph Smith was born in Hackney, London, UK of Antiguan parents, who immigrated to the UK in the 1960s. He was first introduced to roots reggae music by his father Alan Smith, who himself ran a sound system called Count Alan in the 1960s.

== Sound system career ==
While deejaying for the Jah Tubby's sound system, Aba Shanti-I was known as Jasmine Joe. In 1990, Aba took over the running of the Jah Tubby's sound system, debuting at the Leicester carnival. Since then, Aba Shanti-I and his sound system play regularly in the UK, with residencies at the Notting Hill Carnival since 1993, Leicester Carnival and the University of Dub. The sound system has also played in Belgium, France, Italy, Japan, Lithuania, Portugal and Spain. From 1991 to 1993 Aba Shanti-I hosted the legendary Aba Shanti-I Sound System sessions at The House of Roots in Vauxhall, London. The weekly sessions were documented by photographer Mark Aleksy who attended the sessions. Aleksy is currently working on publishing a photobook featuring images from this time, "Bassland. A Roots Reggae Sound System Visual Odyssey".

== Recording career ==
Aba Shanti-I has produced and recorded with his brother and the band the Shanti-Ites, releasing records on their own Falasha imprint. Their first record, Tear Down Babylon was released in 1993. Aba Shanti-I currently has a studio on Morning Lane, Hackney.

=== Singles ===
- Tear Down Babylon (1993)
- The Zulu Warrior (1994)
- Positive Vibration (1995)
- Children of the Most High (1996)
- The Position Vibration (1999)
- Jah Liveth (2000)
- Love in the Ghetto (2000)
- What A Gwan (2004)
- Father Give Life (2004)
- Behold (with Prince Malachi, 2004)
- Inna Sanctuary (with Shandi-I, 2005)
- Every Day (2005)
- Revelation Time (with Shandi-I, 2008)
- Digital Children (with Sister Miriam, 2008)
- Youth Man (with Emmanuel Joseph, 2009)
- Rastaman (with Emmanuel Joseph, 2009)
- Our Father (with Jackie B and Sister Miriam, 2012)
- Babylon Falling (2013)

=== Albums ===
- Wrath of Jah Verse I (1996)
- Pure Spirit (1996)
- Jah Lightning and Thunder (1996)
- Rasta Soul-Jah (with Ras Iyah, 1997)
- Jericho Walls (1999)
- Undiluted
- Psalms From The Heart (with Emmanuel Joseph, 2010)
- Inna Sanctuary (with Shandi-I, 2011)
- The Whole of Me – Testament I & II (with Blood Shanti, 2014)

== Style ==
Aba Shanti-I sound system plays music in the roots reggae and dub style. He cites, Dennis Brown, Bob Marley, Junior Delgado, Yabby You and Prince Lincoln as inspiration. The original tracks are usually supplemented by reverb, delays and effects to generate his distinctive sound.

== Notable residencies ==
- Notting Hill Carnival The sound system has been resident at the Carnival since 1993. It was originally situated on Powys Road, moving to Springbrook Road, then Southern Row; the system is currently situated on the corner between Southern and East Row.
- University of Dub Aba Shanti-I was a founder sound system of the University of Dub in the late 1990s and has been a regular ever since.

== Family ==
Aba Shanti-I's brother, Blood Shanti, is a drummer and vocalist, contributing to both Aba Shanti-I's recordings and live performances. Aba Shanti-I also has a son who accompanies him to many of the shows. His son is a drummer in the band Six Soldiers.

Awards and achievements
Preceded by Smokin Jo	DJ Magazine Number 1 DJ; 1993	Succeeded by Judge Jules
