= Trade (nightclub) =

Defunct gay nightclub in London, England

Coordinates: 51.5221°N 0.1058°W

- Interactive map of Trade
- Location: Turnmills, London and other venues worldwide.
- Capacity: 1,200–1,600 approx at Turnmills
- Type: Nightclub
- Event: Hard House / Techno

Construction
- Opened: 1990
- Closed: 2008

Trade was a culturally important gay club night held at Turnmills in London founded in 1990 by Laurence Malice.

== History ==
=== Early years 1990–1995 ===
Trade originated as an underground club night beneath Turnmills pub in Clerkenwell Road. Trade was the second nightclub Laurence had run at Turnmills; his first was Xanadu, which he co-hosted with the club promoter Robert Pereno. Laurence was a member of the electronic music duo Big Bang when he opened Trade. The history of Trade is inextricably linked with the evolution of Turnmills as a club venue. Xanadu opened in early-1990 and ran on Saturday evenings from 10.00 pm to 2.30 am. Iain, Laurence's band partner in Big Bang, sold tickets on the door. Xanadu ran successfully for around 5–6 months. It was only after Turnmills owner John Newman decided to promote Saturday evenings himself that Laurence was offered the alternative timeslot from 3.00 am onwards on Sunday mornings, after John had secured an all-night licence from Islington Council. Turnmills was the first London venue to be offered such a licence. Laurence accepted the challenge. Thus, Trade was born on 29 October 1990, and, as such, became the capital's first legal after-hours club.

Initially, the club room beneath Turnmills pub was sparse with little or no décor. The space was dark, and a little unsavoury. Pushed into one corner was a beat up old grand piano. In later interviews, Laurence recalled, ‘Trade had been running on an underground tip for the first few months’ Three or four months into the residency, and still finding it difficult to pull in customers, Laurence took decisive action. ‘I invited Tim Stabler to co-promote it with me and oversee the décor in the club.’ At the time, other clubs such as Heaven, G-A-Y and The Fridge closed at around 2 am to 3 am on Sunday mornings, an hour or so before Trade opened at 3 am. It took a while for clubbers to cotton on to the fact that they were able to go straight on to Trade to continue clubbing all night after the other clubs had closed. Once they did, Trade exploded into the phenomena it became.

At the time, many gay men went cruising in the parks after leaving other clubs. The name 'Trade' and opening hours were to encourage people to go to the club as a safer alternative.

Turnmills was the first club in the UK to be given a 24-hour "Music & Dance" licence. This was gained after Laurence Malice had for a long period of time tried to convince Newman that there was a need for people to be able to party in a safe environment after 3 am.

=== 1995–2001 ===
In the mid-late 1990s, Laurence decided to export the Trade brand internationally. Over the next few years, Trade held events throughout the UK and worldwide, in addition to releasing a number of CDs.

‘Then there were launches of Trade at Twilo in New York, Privilege in Ibiza, The Palace in Los Angeles and the launch of Kinky Trade at Amnesia in Ibiza.’

— Laurence Malice, 2015

For New Year's Eve, 1995, Trade were unable to hold their New Year's Eve party at Turnmills. This happened because New Year's Eve 1995 fell on a Sunday and the usual Turnmills Sunday night club - FF - held their NYE night at Turnmills. Trade held a successful New Years Day party at the Leisure Lounge in Holborn, London instead.

In 1998, Trade's popular DJ Tony De Vit died.

Due to the global success of Trade, UK Channel 4 television commissioned an hour-long documentary Trade the all-night bender which was broadcast on 9 August 1998 as part of the Queer Street series of programmes. It featured in the BBC2 programme "Gaytime TV" and also had a regular weekly radio show on Atlantic252.

‘For the main part, my history is as a club promoter. The parties at Turnmills went on to be the catalyst to some extraordinary events which I’m very proud of including Love Parade in Leeds appearing to one and a half million people. There were two stages. One hosted by Trade and the other hosted by Radio 1. The Trade stage had to continue for several hours longer once the Radio 1 stage had closed under the direction of the police to help cope with the vast crowds. No other club, gay or straight, has managed to achieve this again.’

— Laurence Malice, 2015

On 27 May 1999 Turnmills ended Trade's residency due to security problems at the previous week's event. Trade negotiated a 4-week run at LA2 in the London Astoria. During this time the management of Trade and Turnmills resolved the issues. Trade returned to Turnmills on 3 July 1999 for the post-Mardi Gras (the renamed London Gay Pride) party. The following month, on 7 August 1999, Trade had a dance tent at Summer Rites in Brockwell Park, the first time they had a tent at the festival.

Towards the end of the 1990s, as Turnmills fitted out more space in the venue, Trade expanded into a second room, which Laurence named the 'Trade lite lounge'. The room played a lighter funkier style of house music which quickly gained a big following.

In 2000, Trade hosted one of the two main stages (the other BBC Radio 1) for the first UK Love Parade festival held at Roundhay Park, Leeds the event was attended by 1,500,000 people.

=== 2002 onwards ===
Trade ended its weekly London Sunday slot at Turnmills on 27 October 2002, Trade's 12th Birthday.

=== Trade Final at Turnmills ===
Towards the end of Trade’s existence, Laurence had already realised the club had become a victim of its own popularity. ‘With Trade it became difficult to live up to some peoples’ expectations, and certain members of the Trade family didn't want things to change and wanted to influence how the party should be. It's a massive compliment that people loved Trade so much, but it comes with pressure as it has to live up to expectations...’ On 18 January 2008 Trade released a press statement announcing that the final Trade event at Turnmills would be held on 22-23 March 2008. This was due to the expected closure of Turnmills as a clubbing venue. The news was subsequently confirmed on 24 January 2008, when Turnmills officially announced the venue's closure. A further press release, on 30 January 2008, announced that the final date was being brought forward by one week to Sunday 16 March 2008. This was due to "so many 'sell out' events at Turnmills over Easter it would not be practical to run Trade After-Hours over this weekend". Within a few weeks of the tickets going on sale, the event sold out.

One week before Trade the Final happened, Laurence was interviewed live on Gaydar Radio by Dj Gary H in a two-hour, two-part documentary in which he talks about his music career and Trade, and how it all started, the highs and lows, and everything else in between.

Many of the original Trade DJs returned for the final event, including Steve Thomas, Ian M, Daz Saund, Malcolm Duffy, Pete Wardman and Fergie. The club opened its doors at 05:00 and during the night Laurence made a speech in the main room, thanking the clubbers and his associates, and asking everyone 'to really go for it!'. The party continued until the final record, Schöneberg by Marmion, was played by Pete Wardman, finishing at 17:45.

Turnmills has since been demolished and in its place stands a six-storey office block.

=== 25th Anniversary, History - The Final ===
On 25 October 2015 Trade held its 25th birthday anniversary celebration and final party at Egg LDN, billed as 'History - The Final'. Nicole Moudaber and Nina Kraviz were among the headliners that played during the evening. The event brought together former resident and guest DJ's who had played at Trade during its 25-year history.

After Trade closed, Laurence commissioned Iain from Big Bang to write a script for a stage production tentatively titled: TRADE – the Musical. Iain has completed a script, although the project has yet to move forward.

Trade was to have celebrated its 30th birthday in 2020, but due to the COVID-19 restrictions the event was postponed.

== DJs ==
The original Trade resident DJs included, Martin Confusion, Daz Saund, Trevor Rockliffe, Smokin Jo, and Malcolm Duffy, These were followed most notably by the late Tony De Vit, but also Tall Paul, Alan Thompson, Steve Thomas, Pete Wardman, Ian M, Fergie, BK, and Andy Farley.

Many other DJs have graced the decks at Trade throughout its tenure including Queen Maxine, Gonzalo Rivas, The Sharp Boys, Frankie Knuckles, David Morales and Danny Tenaglia.

== Trade Décor/Artwork ==
To decorate the interior of the club, fluorescent banners and wall-hangings were used, illuminated by ultra violet lighting. Laurence ordered Tim Stabler to produce some of the interior décor. Laurence also commissioned the artists TradeMark (Mark Wardell), Martin ‘B-Art’ Brown, and Mark McKenzie to create many images and artworks used over the years for the interior of the club, advertising and promotions.

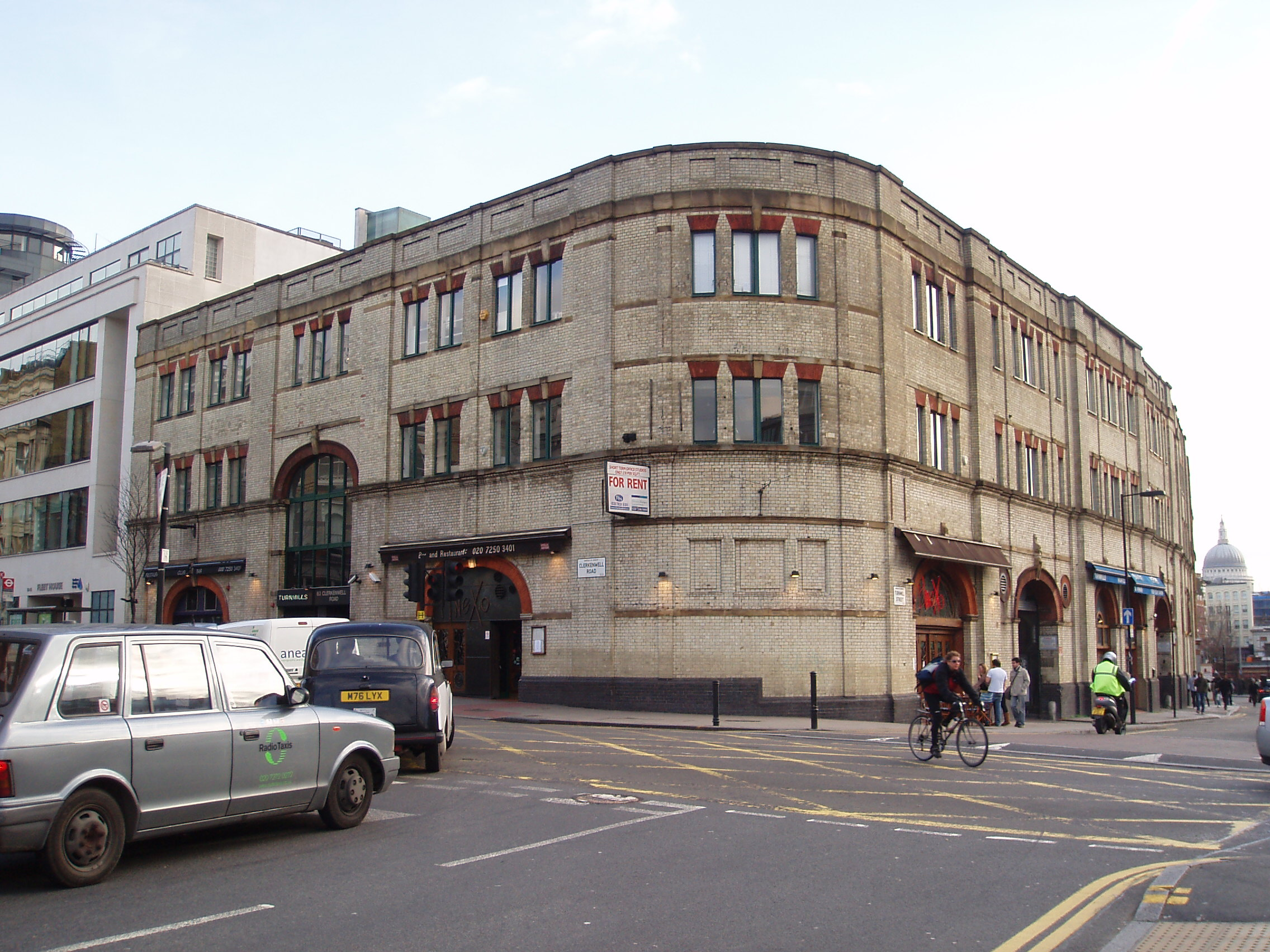
Turnmills - Trade's London home.

== Celebrity patrons ==
Trade attracted many celebrities over the years including Madonna, Bjork, Kate Moss, Marc Almond, Rupert Everett, Alexander McQueen, and John Galliano. The club's policy afforded them no special privileges nor could they bring along entourages. Those expecting this, such as Cher, and Axl Rose, were refused entry.

== Trade (after Turnmills) ==
Since 2008, Laurence and the promotion team behind the Trade brand have run one-off specials around the UK and the world. After Trade closed, Laurence opened Egg nightclub in Kings Cross, London. In May 2003, EGG won the prestigious BEDA Award for Best Club in London. In 2018, EGG LDN announced a world tour.

== Sources ==
- Reynolds, Simon (2013). Generation Ecstasy: Into the World of Techno and Rave Culture. Routledge. ISBN 9781136783166.
