= Smokin Jo =

- Born: Joanne Joseph; 4 February 1967 (age 59); London, England
- Origin: Birmingham, England
- Genres: House; deep house; techno
- Occupations: DJ; record producer
- Years active: 1990–present
- Website: djsmokinjo.com

Joanne Joseph (born 4 February 1967), known by her stage name Smokin Jo, is a British DJ and record producer from London, England. She is the only female DJ to win the number one DJ in the world award by DJ Mag in 1992.

== Musical career ==
She began her career in 1990 when she got her first set of decks. In 1991, Jo was given an opportunity to play at London gay club Trade at Turnmills. This led to a residency there that would continue until 1993, launching her career. In 1992 she played in Ibiza for the first time, on the terrace at Space. the same year she was named as DJ Magazines No1 DJ. She also presented the BBC Radio 1 (essential selection) weekly report from Ibiza, between 2002 and 2006.

Jo has gigged all over the world, and in every big club night, playing as far and wide as Japan, Germany, Brazil, Greece, USA (including Space in Miami) China and Singapore. In the UK she has played Ministry of Sound, Fabric, XOYO, The Beams, Printworks in London. She still plays in Ibiza for Glitterbox.

== Awards and nominations ==
=== DJ Magazine ===
Selected awards
Year	Award	Nominated work	Category	Result
1992	DJ Magazine	Smokin Jo	No1 DJ Award	Won

==== Top 100 DJs ====
Year	Position	Notes	Ref.
1997	97	New Entry	
1998	78	Up 19	
1999	93	Down 15	
Hiatus
2002	88	Re Entry	
2003	99	Down 11	

=== DJ Awards ===
Selected awards
Year	Award	Nominated work	Category	Result
2005	DJ Awards	Smokin Jo	Best Ibiza DJ	Nominated

== Discography ==
=== Compilation albums ===
- Infinite Ibiza, White Island Music, 2001.
- Trust the DJ: SJ01, in 2002.

=== DJ Mixes albums ===
- White Island Fever, MuzikMagazine, 2001.
- Full Intention and Smokin'Jo-Defected Sessions, Enter Records, 2002
- Smokin Jo and Tim Sheridan – Sessions, Ministry of Sound, 2005.
- Smokin'Jo-Terrace Mix, MixMag, 2006.

=== Singles and EPs ===
- Yoni (11), Smokin'Jo, Suck on This (12"), Sugarcube Recordings, 1997.
- Malcom Duffy meets Smokin'Jo-Bean Hut (12"), Remote Recordings, 1999.
- Yanu-House, House Tempo Records, 27 July 2001.
- Psycho Bitch EP, Fluential Records, 2001.
- Smokin'Jo (EP & TP, 12"), Fluential Records, 2001.
- Psycho Bitch EP, Feel the Rhythum Records, 2002.
- Smokin'Jo and Pete Heller-Present Sleepers (2) – Fishbone (12"), Junior London Recordings, 2002.
- Pete Gleadall and Smokin'Jo Present Los Vengadores – The Music (12"), Whoop! Records, 2003.
- Smokin'Jo and Washington-Present Black Europeans-The State of Mind (12"), Distraekt Records, 2003.
- Umona – 3 Versions, Area Remote Records, 2009.
- Native Dance – 2 Versions, Area Remote Records, 2010.
- Smokin'Jo and Nichole Moudaber – Home Sweet Home (12"), Yellow Tail Records, 2010.
- Heads Down – 2 Versions, Area Remote Records, 2012.
- Smokin'Jo and Falomir – I see sunrise (12") Area Remote Records, 2014.
- Nichole Moudaber and Smokin Jo – Can't say no to that (12") Doppleganger, 2014.
- Nichole Moudaber and Smokin Jo – Home sweet home (Dub Version) (12") ADSR Records, 2014.
- Smokin'Jo – What's going on (12") Doppleganger, (2015).

Awards and achievements
Preceded by Danny Rampling	DJ Magazine Number 1 DJ; 1992	Succeeded by Aba Shanti-I
