= Egg London =

Nightclub in London, England

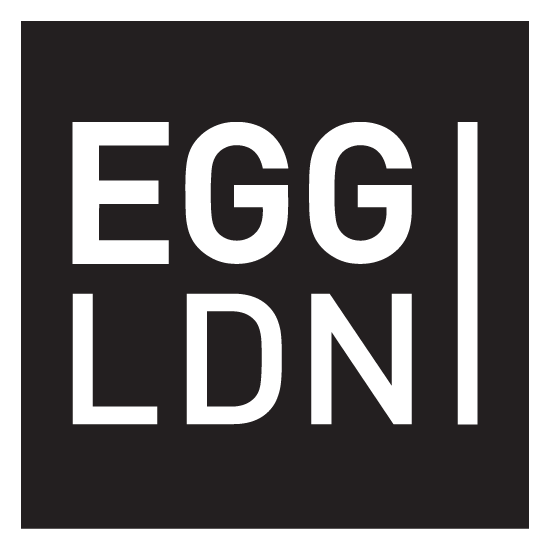
- Location: King's Cross, London, England
- Coordinates: 51°32′33.1″N 0°07′31.20″W
- Type: Nightclub
- Capacity: 900
- Opened: 2003

Website
- egglondon.co.uk

Egg London or Egg LDN is a British electronic dance music venue and nightclub based in Kings Cross, North London. The venue has historically demonstrated a primary interest in techno and house music, however at present a variety of electronic dance music is regularly featured in addition to those genres. Egg London consists of three levels hosting three rooms:, Main Room, Middle Floor, Loft and three outside spaces. It has a capacity of 1000 and is granted a 24-hour licence at weekends. In 2017 Egg London won DJ Magazine's Best of British award for 'Best Large Club'.

== History ==
The club was founded by Laurence Malice and opened in May 2003. Long-standing promoter Ali Bee and former head of operations Sen Jay have come together to establish Chapter One Creations and have taken over from original Egg founder Laurence Malice as of 2024. Originally a Victorian warehouse, the building was purchased by Malice in 1997, where it was first used as the headquarters for his original brainchild, Trade. The name Egg is a reference to rebirth.

== Label ==
What Came First is a new label dedicated to electronic music which was set up by the people behind Egg London club venue in 2016. What Came First aims to introduce rising new talents as well as working with established artists across a range of musical genres from techno to house and chill-out to alternative.

== Events ==
Primarily hosting electronic music events, the club frequently books artists under the house and techno genre, both in the club itself and on an international scale. The style of music on a Friday night differs to that of Saturday, with Friday nights targeted at a younger audience, leading to a huge surge in popularity amongst London’s student scene. Friday bookings showcase a more commercial side to house music with the likes of Secondcity, Route 94, Latmun and Detlef frequently playing in the club from 11pm - 6am. Saturdays attract an older audience with techno artists on the bill including Laurent Garnier, Pan-Pot, Matador, Monika Kruse, Sam Paganini, Sven Vath and more until 8am supported by Egg LDN’s in house resident, Kyle E and local London talent including Jozeff and many more.

== Charity ==
Over the years Egg has provided support to many local, national and international charities, the main two being The Father Ray Foundation & Shelter From The Storm. The Father Ray Foundation is located in Pattaya, Thailand, and takes care of 850 orphaned, abused and disadvantage children and students with disabilities. Located locally in Kings Cross, Shelter From The Storm is London’s free homeless shelter, open all year round and funded by donation alone.

== Awards ==
Egg London won the award for Best Large Club at DJ Mag's Best of British Awards in December 2019. In 2017 it polled the 36th position in that magazine's International Top 100 Club Awards.

== See also ==
- Trade (nightclub)
- Techno
- List of electronic dance music venues
