= Diva house =

Subgenre of house music

- Other names: Handbag house
- Stylistic origins: House; garage house; R&B; dance-pop; soul; disco; EDM; gospel; show tune
- Cultural origins: Emerging 1990s music, LGBT culture
- Derivative forms: Hardbag; house-pop

Fusion genres
- Italo house

Other topics
- Camp (style); diva; gay culture; computer music; record labels; gay icon; circuit party; gay anthem; gay pride

Diva house, also known as handbag house, is a subgenre of house music that emerged in the early 1990s and became popular in gay clubs during the second half of that decade. The Encyclopedia of Contemporary British Culture defines handbag house as featuring "prominent female vocals, breakdowns, and a proliferation of piano 'stabs'." Contemporary examples typically employ four on the floor rhythms and synthesized instrumental accents.

== History ==
The term "diva house" was in use by at least July 1992, when Billboard described Dee Dee Simone's "What Are We Doin'" as "iron-lunged diva-house". The style is characterized by prominent vocals, often performed by or sampled from female singers. Source material has included soul, disco, gospel and musical theatre recordings, frequently drawing on performers who have been associated with gay audiences, such as Bette Midler, Judy Garland, and Liza Minnelli. The genre has also included club-oriented tracks and remixes of pop recordings by artists including Beyoncé, Kylie Minogue, Cher, Patti LaBelle, Aretha Franklin, Mariah Carey, Whitney Houston, and Madonna.

The term "handbag house" has been particularly associated with British club culture. It is commonly explained as a reference to groups of women dancing around handbags placed on the floor, though early usage within dance culture has been described as derogatory.

During the 1990s, house music gained wider exposure alongside the increased visibility gay clubs and nightlife. Diva house became one of the more accessible styles within club music, contributing to its presence beyond underground scenes. In the United Kingdom, handbag house was widely identified with mainstream club culture. Music historians Bill Brewster and Frank Broughton note that by the mid-1990s, the style played a role in the expansion of clubbing as a "mainstream leisure activity." During the 1990s, the term “diva” became commonly associated with vocal-driven house music in gay club scenes.

== Reception ==
Several writers have discussed the cultural reception of handbag house. Music critic Simon Reynolds describes it as a term initially used pejoratively to distinguish commercially successful, vocal-driven house music from styles favored by underground audiences. According to Reynolds, the mainstream appeal of handbag house caused underground dance music purists to flock to the spin-off genres of hardbag, progressive house, deep house, and garage house. Ewan Pearson and Jeremy Gilbert note that the genre has often been criticized by some dance music fans for emphasizing melody and vocals over more abstract musical forms. Sociologist Dunja Brill has argued that negative portrayals of handbag house reflect broader gendered distinctions within club culture, particularly in the framing of mainstream pop-oriented styles.

== See also ==
- Camp (style)
- Diva
- Gay anthem
- Gay club
- Gay icons
