= Tony De Vit =

English DJ (1957–1998)

Background information
- Born: Antony de Vit; 12 September 1957; Kidderminster, England
- Died: 2 July 1998 (aged 40) Birmingham, England
- Genres: House, techno, hard house, hard NRG
- Occupations: DJ, producer
- Years active: 1976–1998

Antony de Vit (/dəˈviː/ də-VEE; 12 September 1957 – 2 July 1998) was an English DJ and music producer. He is considered one of the most influential of his generation. He was credited with helping to take the "hard house" and fast "hard NRG" sounds out of the London and Birmingham gay scene into mainstream clubs. His single "Burning Up" reached number 25 on the UK Singles Chart in March 1995, with "To the Limit" making number 44 in September 1995. During that year, he won BBC Radio 1 Essential Mix of the Year Award, as voted by listeners of the show, and Music Week's re-mix of Year Award for Louise's "Naked". He remixed several UK top 40 hits during his career with artists such as Taylor Dayne and East 17. Between 1994 and 1998 his popularity with the clubbing public was rivaled by only Paul Oakenfold and Carl Cox. In September 2010, Mixmag UK announced the nominations of 35 DJs chosen by other big names in the world of dance music as those they considered the best DJs ever. A subsequent 15-month survey, which polled hundreds of thousands of global votes, asked who was the "greatest DJ of all time" and when the result was announced in January 2011, de Vit was ranked number 9.

== Early life ==
Antony de Vit was born to Raymond de Vit and June Silcock in Kidderminster.

== Career ==
Tony de Vit began DJing at the age of 17, as a wedding DJ in 1976 playing at local pubs in his home town of Kidderminster, followed in his early 20s, by his first residency at the Nightingale in Birmingham on a Monday night where he played pop and hi-NRG. He would often have to sweep floors and empty ashtrays after the club had closed. During the early 1980s, he worked at Wolverhampton's Beacon Radio, playing club tracks during a regular late-night slot on the show hosted by Mike Baker of Smooth FM.

Around 1988 London's gay superclub, Heaven was looking for an alternative DJ. For which De Vit was employed, playing the main floor two Saturdays a month.

In 1990, another soon-to-be-influential club named Trade emerged onto the scene. De Vit stood in one night for DJ Smokin' Jo. Following his set, de Vit landed his own residency at Trade. Later in his career he would perform a 12-hour DJ set on two occasions at Trade; some consider these his defining moments as a DJ.

In 1992, the illegal raves in the UK moved into the clubs in a bid to legalise the scene. One of the key figures of the house music scene at this time was a Birmingham promoter called Simon Raine, who took an interest in de Vit's career. He put de Vit on the bill alongside Fabio and Grooverider at The Institute and encouraged him to move into other house parties as de Vit had predominately played in the gay club scene. Raine had launched the Gatecrasher club nights and, taking his advice, de Vit played at the 'Chuff Chuff' events sharing the bill with Sasha.

In the same year, de Vit teamed up with Simon Parkes to create the V2 recording studio based in The Custard Factory, Gibb St, Birmingham with a view to co-write new material for de Vit to play within his sets.

At this time he recorded and released his first record, "Feel the Love". His second release was a track called "Higher & Higher", which became the future benchmark for de Vit and Parkes' V2 concept. De Vit's/Parkes' track "Burning Up" went to No. 24 on the UK top 40 charts.

In 1995, Radio 1 contacted de Vit for his first Essential Mix. de Vit featured on a number of compilation dance mix albums during this year including Fantazia House Collection Volume 2 and the Remixers album, Sound Dimension's Retrospective of House Volumes 2 & 4, Boxed's Global Underground series Live in Tel Aviv, Live in Tokyo, Kiss Mix 97, Trade Volumes 1 & 3, and the international release, Trade Global Grooves.

With the launch of Jump Wax Records in 1996, hard house music in the UK became more mainstream. De Vit's "Are You All Ready?" and "I Don't Care" received radio play and sales. Following the closure of Jump Wax Records in 1996, de Vit launched his own label (TDV Records), which saw him release "Bring the Beat Back" and "Get Loose", both co-written with Simon Parkes. De Vit went on to play at dance clubs/events in the UK, including Legacy @ The Manor in Ringwood, Slinky @ the Opera House in Bournemouth, Cream, Gatecrasher, Godskitchen and Creamfields. He garnered a string of awards and nominations during the year, including Mixmag's '2nd Best DJ of the Year 1996', M8 magazine's 'Best DJ of the Year 1996' and was selected by Music Week as 'Top Remixer of 1996'. His remix of Louise's "Naked" earned Music Week's vote as the 'Ground breaking Remix of 1996'.

In 1997, de Vit was offered a show on 'Kiss 100'. He was ranked number 5 in DJ Magazine's Top 100 DJs in the World the same year. In early 1998, de Vit recorded "The Dawn" with Paul Janes and Andy Buckley, which was part of the six-track Trade EP. De Vit commented that he was 'very proud of it'. Paul Janes went on to remix "The Dawn" as a tribute to de Vit's work. The track has been considered to be his best work.

== Death ==
He tested HIV+ in 1996. His drug regime never settled and he suffered many side effects. On 2 July 1998, at the age of 40, he died of bronchial failure and bone marrow failure at Heartlands Hospital in East Birmingham. He had collapsed a few days earlier during a holiday in Miami, Florida. After de Vit's death, a conflict kept his records unavailable for many years, but finally a compilation album of his songs and remixes was released called Are You All Ready? on Tidy Trax records.

== Influence and legacy ==
The influence of the Tony De Vit is sufficiently significant for the music press to dub him the "godfather of UK hard house", and in 2023 the DJ Mag journalist Stewart Who cited him as a "true hero of UK dance music". A number of artists have cited Tony de Vit as an influence, such as Fergie, Andy Farley, Dave Pearce, Paul F1 King, Steven J, and Lisa Lashes.

In 2022 a blue plaque commemorating De Vit was unveiled at the Custard Factory in Digbeth, Birmingham, where he had a recording studio. In 2023 to commemorate the 25 year anniversary of his death, the record label Tidy Trax released a compilation of remixes of De Vit's work by artists including Eats Everything, Nicole Moudaber and Hannah Laing, and a documentary about his life was released by Restless Films, called Don't Ever Stop: Tony De Vit.

== Discography ==
Releases

=== Albums ===
- Are You Ready 2xCD, Tidy Trax, (2003)
- TDV25 – Tony De Vit – Greatest Hits 2xCD, Tidy Trax, (2023)

=== Singles & EP's ===
- Feel the love/Make love to me (12"), V2, (1993).
- Burning Up (7 versions), Icon Records, (1995).
- To the Limit (4 versions), Xplode Records/PWL International, (1995).
- 99th Floor Elevator's (5 versions) featuring Tony De Vit-Hooked, Labello Dance/PWL International, (1995).
- 99th Floor Elevator's (3 versions) featuring Tony De Vit-I'll be There, PWL International, (1996)
- I Don't Care/Resistance is Futile (9 versions), Jump Wax Records, (1996).
- Are You All Ready/UFO (4 versions), Jump Wax Records, (1996)
- Feel My Love/Get Loose (3 versions), TDV Records, (1997).
- Bring the Beat Back (Club & Trade Mixes) (12" White Label), TdV Records, (1997).
- Don't Ever Stop/Bring the Beat Back (3 versions), TdV Records, (1998).
- Steve Thomas/Tony De Vit-Trade EP Disc 02 (12" EP), Trade Records, (1998).
- Tony De Vit featuring Petronella-Do What You Do (3 versions), TdV Records, (1998)
- Paul King/TdV-Kick it In/Bring the Beat Back (3 versions), TdV Records, (1998).
- Splash Down/Are You All Ready (2 versions), Tidy Trax, (1999).
- The Dawn (3 versions), Tidy Trax, (2000)
- Tony De Vit-Stimulant DJ's (Tidy Trax Sound EP 12"), Tidy Trax, (2000)
- Destination (2 versions), Plenty Records, (2002)
- Tony De Vit (feat) Niki Mak-Give Me A Reason (4 versions), Tidy Two, (2003).
- Give Me A Reason/Bring the Beat Back (12" TP), Tidy Two, (2003).
- The Dawn/I Don't Care (12"), Tidy White, (2004).
- Tony De Vit/Lee Haslam-The Dawn/The Music is a Drug (12"), Tidy Classics, (2005).

=== DJ Mixes ===
- Mark Moore/Tony De Vit-Chuff Chuff Chuff Summer Ball 93 (2 cassette mixed), (1993).
- The Fantazia House Collection 2 (CD3) – Tony de Vit (1995).
- The Remixers-Tony De Vit (CD Mix), Fantazia Records, (1995).
- Tony De Vit & Jon of the Pleased Wimmin live at Bangkok (1995).
- A Retrospective of House '91–'95 2 (CD2) – Tony de Vit (1995).
- A Retrospective of House '91–'96 4 (CD1) – Tony de Vit (1996).
- Trade Volume Three, Steve Thomas (CD1) & Tony De Vit (CD2), Feverpitch, (1996).
- Global Underground GU001 Live in Tel Aviv (4 versions), Global Underground Ltd, (1996).
- An Introspective of House 3 (CD2) – Tony de Vit (1997).
- Graham Gold and Tony De Vit-Kiss Mix 97 (2x Mix CD), Polygram, (1997).
- Jim 'Shaft' Ryan-Mark Moore-Tony De Vit-Glamorous One, Miss Moneypenny's Music, (1997).
- Global Underground GU005 Tokyo (5 versions), Boxed, (1997).
- Trade Global Grooves Volume 1 (2 versions), Feverpitch, (1997).
- Seb Fontaine-Tony De Vit-Elements (1st Testament) (2x CD Mix Compilation), Warner Music UK Ltd, (1998).

=== Other releases ===
- Notes: This section includes the body of Tony De Vit's work other than his own releases during his career.

=== Appearances (170) ===
Include:

- Albums (4)
- Compilations (51)
- Mixes (109)
- Singles & EP's(5)
- Videos (1)

=== Unofficial (32) ===
- Mixes (27)
- Singles & EP's (5)

=== Credits (304) ===
- Acting, Literary and Spoken (1)
- Featuring and Presenting (8)
- DJ Mix (25)
- Production (35)
- Remix (2013)
- Technical (4)
- Writing and Arrangement (18)

== Awards and nominations ==
=== BBC Radio 1 Awards ===
Selected awards
Year	Award	Nominated work	Category	Result
1995	BBC Radio 1	Tony De Vit	Essential Mix of the Year	Won

=== British Entertainment and Dance Awards ===
Selected awards
Year	Award	Nominated work	Category	Result
1996	BEDA	Tony De Vit	Dance DJ of the Year	Nominated

=== DJ Magazine Awards ===
Selected awards
Year	Award	Nominated work	Category	Result
1996	DJ Magazine	Tony De Vit	No1 DJ of the Year (5th)	Nominated
1997	DJ Magazine	Tony De Vit	No1 DJ of the Year (5th)	Nominated
1998	DJ Magazine	Tony De Vit	No1 DJ of the Year (12th)	Nominated

=== DJ Awards ===
Selected awards
Year	Award	Nominated work	Category	Result
1998	DJ Awards	Tony De Vit	Special Award 'Honoured'	Won

=== International Dance Music Awards ===
Selected awards
Year	Award	Nominated work	Category	Result
1996	IDMA	Tony De Vit	Best DJ	Nominated

=== Music Week Awards ===
Selected awards
Year	Award	Nominated work	Category	Result
1996	Music Week	Tony De Vit	Ground Breaking Re-Mix of the Year for Louise's "Naked"	Won
1996	Music Week	Tony De Vit	Top Re-Mixer of the Year	Nominated

=== M8 Magazine Awards ===
Selected awards
Year	Award	Nominated work	Category	Result
1996	M8 magazine	Tony De Vit	Best DJ of the Year	Nominated

=== Muzik Magazine Awards ===
Selected awards
Year	Award	Nominated work	Category	Result
1996	Muzik Magazine	Tony De Vit	Best New DJ	Nominated

=== Mix Mag Awards ===
Selected awards
Year	Award	Nominated work	Category	Result
1996	Mixmag	Tony De Vit	DJ of the Year (2nd)	Nominated
2011	Mixmag	Tony De Vit	Greatest DJ of All Time (9th)	Nominated

=== Vice Magazine/Thump TV ===
Selected awards
Year	Award	Nominated work	Category	Result
2014	Vice-Thump Channel TV	Tony De Vit	The 20 Greatest Gay DJ's of All Time (Honoured)	Nominated

== See also ==
- Fergie – Northern Irish DJ (born 1979)
- Daz Saund – British DJ
- Smokin Jo
- Carl Cox – British DJ (born 1962)
- Mrs Wood – British DJ and record producer
