= Mrs Wood =

British DJ and record producer

- Born: Jane Rolink
- Origin: Barnsley, South Yorkshire, England
- Genres: House; Techno; Hard house hardbag
- Occupations: Remixer, DJ
- Years active: 1990–present
- Label: React

Jane Rolink, known by her stage name Mrs Wood, is a British DJ and record producer.

== Career ==
Born in Barnsley, England, from 1990 she became involved in the hardbag and UK techno scene. Mrs Wood first came to prominence via her output on the React record label. Her first single "Whodunnit?" was issued in 1994, shortly followed by one of her best-known releases, "Calamity Jane".

In autumn 1995 Mrs Wood enjoyed crossover success with "Joanna", largely considered one of the defining tracks of the hardbag era. Featuring a tradestyle remix from Tony De Vit as well as her own more minimal version, "Joanna" became one of the first hardbag releases to reach the Top 40 of the UK Singles Chart, and was at this juncture one of the biggest-selling tracks to have been released on React.

Further success ensued with "Heartbreak", which featured vocals from Cleveland City signing Eve Gallagher, another artist who became synonymous with the house music and hardbag scene of the mid-1990s. "Heartbreak" charted at #44 in the UK, and featured remixes from former Happy Clappers producer C J Scott, as well as a technoid variation from Wood herself, co-produced by longtime cohort, Kevin White.

The following year witnessed the release of "Feel So Good", Mrs Wood's highest-placed chart hit, a double A-side coupled with a Sash! remix of "Joanna". Also included in the mix package were further variations from Dancing Divaz, Nush and the original 1995 remix by Tony De Vit. "Road Rage" was issued in a limited quantity in late 1996, which Wood released under the sobriquet, Madame Dubois.

Shortly after the success of "Feel So Good", Mrs Wood began producing less commercially orientated, techno- and nu-nrg-influenced tracks such as "1,2,3,4", which was less well received, despite featuring a trancey remake from Vincent De Moor. Her debut album, Woodwork, followed. Co-produced by Kevin White, Woodwork consisted largely of minimal, techno-based compositions.

Mrs Wood is perhaps best remembered for her React-released mix compilation albums, Mrs Wood Teaches Techno and 1996's Bitter & Twisted (half of which was remixed by her long-time stablemate Blu Peter). Showcasing a variety of tracks in an array of genres, Bitter & Twisted featured material from artists as disparate as LSG, 16C+ and Mark NRG.

== Discography ==
Include:

=== Albums ===
- 1993: Mrs Wood Teaches Techno (React Music)
- 1996: Mrs Wood & Blu Peter - Bitter & Twisted (React Music)
- 1998: Woodwork (React Music) UK Independent Albums Chart #33

=== Singles/EPs ===
- 1994: "The Awakening"/"Calamity Jane" (React Music)
- 1994: "Whodunnit?" (React Music)
- 1995: "Joanna" (React Music) UK #40
- 1996: "Heartbreak" featuring Eve Gallagher (React Music) UK #44
- 1997: "Joanna '97" (React Music) UK #34
- 1998: "1,2,3,4" (React Music) UK #54
- 2004: "Joanna 2004" (React Music)
