= Hardbag =

Genre of electronic dance music

- Stylistic origins: EDM; handbag house; hi-NRG; new beat; dance-pop
- Cultural origins: Early 1990s, United Kingdom

Hardbag is a genre of electronic dance music popular in the mid-1990s. Having evolved out of the handbag house scene in 1993–1994, the genre enjoyed massive, albeit brief, popularity, with several hardbag releases achieving positions in the upper echelons of the UK chart. It was at the time sometimes confused with nu-NRG, yet the styles were discernibly different.

"Don't You Want Me" by Felix is largely considered to be the track that launched the hardbag explosion. Produced by Rollo Armstrong of Faithless, Red Jerry and Felix, "Don't You Want Me" was released in 1992, scoring a Top 10 placing on the UK singles chart.

The popularity of the hardbag genre reached its zenith in 1995 with releases by Commander Tom, Candy Girls, Rollo & Sister Bliss and Mrs Wood all crossing over into the mainstream. Indeed, the sound began to meld with mákina, evident on tracks such as "Forever Young" by Interactive and "Rainbow Islands" by Seb.

The two most influential exponents of the sound were Dutch producer Patrick Prins (who, recording a variety of aliases, scored several large UK club and chart hits such as "Bits & Pieces" – Artemesia) and the late Tony De Vit, whose hardbag composition "Hooked" is still considered one of the definitive examples of the genre. Another great presence in the hardbag scene was Red Jerry, former head of Hooj Choons. Other influential producers include Rollo Armstrong (later of the group Faithless) and Paul Masterson, the latter of whom diversified hardbag remixes to incorporate hi-NRG elements.

By early 1997 the Hardbag craze had died down, since then Hardbag created an influence on UK hard house and electro house. Labels such as Tripoli Trax expounded this sound via releases such as "Bells Of Revolution" by Lemon 8 and "Raise Your Hands" by Knuckleheadz.

Several hardbag producers went on to become big names within the trance scene in the late 1990s. These included Matt Darey (as Bi-Boy Action Squad, Orgasmatron and Space Baby), Sister Bliss (as a solo artist and co-producer with Rollo and Jon of the Pleased Wimmin), and John Graham whose Quivver alias had a hardbag hit with "Saxy Lady" (1994).

== Examples ==
The following releases are considered notable examples of the genre:

- 1992: "Don't You Want Me" – Felix (Deconstruction label, UK No. 6)
- 1994: "La Luna" – The Ethics (produced by Patrick Prins) (Effective label, UK No. 13)
- 1994: "Crazy Man" – Blast (Media label, UK No. 22)
- 1994: "The Ultimate" – Antic (Hooj Choons, UK No. 71)
- 1995: "Burning Up" – Tony De Vit (:VC: label, UK No. 25)
- 1995: "Hooked" – 99th Floor Elevators feat. Tony De Vit (Labello Dance, UK No. 28)
- 1995: "To the Limit" – Tony De Vit (:VC: label, UK No. 44)
- 1995: "Play this House" – BB Club (Positiva label, UK No. 65)
- 1994: "Bits & Pieces" – Artemesia (Hooj Choons, UK No. 46)
- 1995: "Let's Whip it Up" – Sleaze Sisters Feat. Vicki Shepard (UK No. 46)
- 1995: "Listen to the Rhythm Flow" – Diva Rhythms (Tripoli Trax)
- 1995: "Fee Fi Fo Fum" – Candy Girls (:VC: label, UK No. 23)
- 1995: "Wham Bam" – Candy Girls (:VC: label, UK No. 20)
- 1995: "Oh! What a World" – Sister Bliss (Go! Beat label, UK No. 40)
- 1995: "U Girls" – Nush (:VC: label, UK No. 15)
- 1995: "Passion" – Amen UK (Deconstruction label, UK No. 15)
- 1995: "Joanna" – Mrs Wood (React label, No. 34; "Joanna" was remixed by Sash! in 1997, peaking at No. 31)
- 1996: "Forever Young" (Red Jerry remix – Interactive, UK No. 28)
- 1996: "There's Nothing I Won't Do" - JX (Hooj Choons, UK No. 4)
