= G-A-Y =

Gay nightclub in London

- Status: Active
- Genre: Night club
- Locations: London, England
- Years active: 49–50 years
- Inaugurated: 1976; 50 years ago
- Leader: Jeremy Joseph
- Organiser: G-A-Y Ltd by Jeremy Joseph
- Sponsor: G-A-Y Ltd, MAMA Group
- Website: g-a-yandheaven.co.uk

G-A-Y is a long-running gay nightclub brand, based at the Heaven nightclub in Charing Cross, London, owned by Jeremy Joseph.

G-A-Y also previously operated a sister gay bar on Soho's Old Compton Street, which closed in 2025, and G-A-Y Late, another club at Goslett Yard, which closed in 2023.

The G-A-Y brand is also used by a bar in Manchester's Gay Village as a franchisee.

== History ==
BANG emerged onto London's Gay scene in March 1976 at the Sundown club in the basement of the London Astoria. It was founded by Gerry Collins and Jack Barrie; Gerry worked at the Marquee Recording Studio and Jack was the manager of the Marquee Club in Wardour Street. Jack was the door host and Gerry DJ'd under the moniker Gary London, along with Tallulah (DJ) and Norman Scott.

In the early 1990s, BANG was acquired by Jeremy Joseph, who changed the clubs name to G-A-Y. G-A-Y operated from the London Astoria for 15 years until July 2008. The Boston Globe described it as "London's largest gay-themed club night", NME reported that it "attracts 6,000 clubbers each week", and The Independent described it as "the one London gig that really matters" for "today's pop stars".

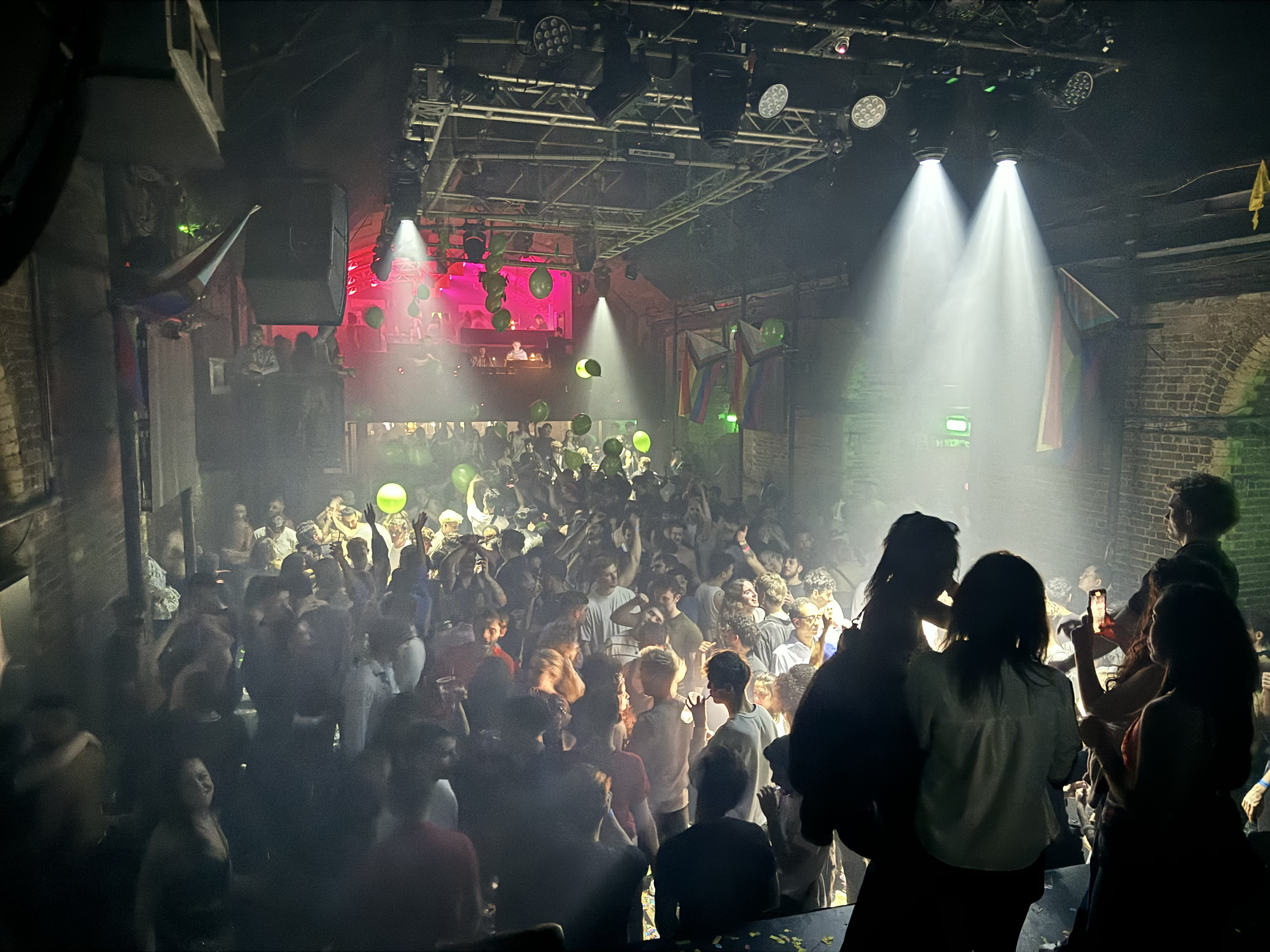
Heaven Nightclub is host to the G-A-Y brand and is frequented by club-goers 4 nights a week.

G-A-Y is associated with G-A-Y Bar and was associated with G-A-Y Late. A major stake in the brand was bought on 13 August 2007 by the MAMA Group. On Friday 3 October 2008, G-A-Y moved to the famous gay venue Heaven, which MAMA Group had acquired a few weeks earlier on 22 September 2008.

MAMA Group was sold to HMV in the 2010s, who subsequently went into administration in 2013, selling the MAMA Group and Hammersmith Apollo in 2012, yet retaining their shares to the G-A-Y brand. After HMV Group plc fell into more difficulty, Jeremy Joseph re-purchased the remaining shares of the G-A-Y brand held by HMV to claim sole ownership of the G-A-Y group of venues, thus owning G-A-Y Bar, G-A-Y Late & Heaven.

After the COVID-19 pandemic, Mr Joseph founded The G-A-Y Foundation, which has raised almost £1m for various charities, including Dogs Trust, AKT, and Switchboard, with fundraising typically taking place in the lead up to the annual London Marathon, in which Mr Joseph has participated.

== G-A-Y brand ==
The G-A-Y brand expanded to two other bars in the Soho area of London, and one in the Gay Village of Manchester.

G-A-Y Bar is a multi-level gay bar located on Soho's Old Compton Street, offering a range of music and drinks offers, 7 days a week. Outside of G-A-Y Bar has become the host of the flyers and wristbands that provide free or reduced fee entry to other G-A-Y venues.

G-A-Y Late was a single-level gay club located near the site of the former London Astoria in Goslett Yard, around the corner from G-A-Y Bar. The club was named as such due to its later opening hours than its sister bar on Old Compton Street.

In April 2011, the G-A-Y brand arrived in Manchester's Canal Street gay village, with a G-A-Y bar opening in the former venue of Spirit Bar. On October 28, 2021, Jeremy Joseph announced that G-A-Y Manchester would be sold to Lee Kellow as part of a G-A-Y franchise agreement. Mr Joseph remained the owner of G-A-Y Bar, G-A-Y Late & Heaven.

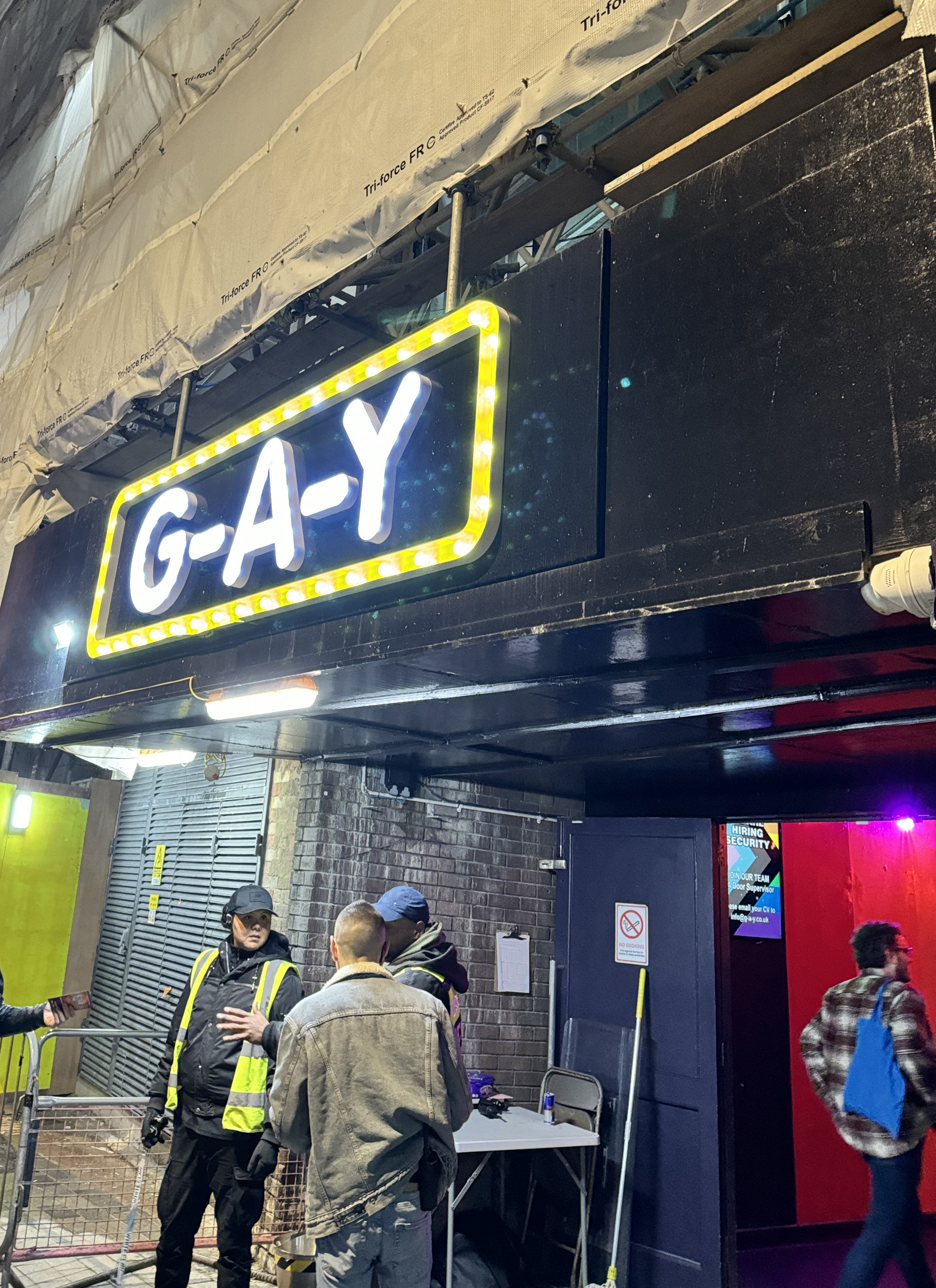
The entrance to the G-A-Y Late venue, prior to closure in December 2023.

== Closures ==
G-A-Y Late was closed permanently on 10 December 2023, with owner Jeremy Joseph citing 'external pressures' as the reason for the closure, including accessibility issues, safety concerns, and consistent building works surrounding the venue.

G-A-Y Bar on Old Compton Street was put up for sale in January 2025 with a rent of £410,000 per annum, with owner Jeremy Joseph saying Soho had "lost its vibrancy". Citing external and financial pressures, the bar was put on the market and Joseph cited lower visitor numbers and revenue caused by the NIMBY community in Soho and lack of support from local authority bodies.

On 1 October 2025, Jeremy Joseph announced via Instagram that G-A-Y Bar would be closing its doors permanently, writing it was "time to say goodbye to G-A-Y Bar". Joseph praised the bar's landlords and called for commercial tenant reform, later confirming that Heaven Nightclub would remain open despite a rental increase. The bar closed on 5 October 2025.

== Controversies ==
In 2011, owner Jeremy Joseph tweeted that straight people were not welcome to a One Direction gig, stating: "My birthday wish is for little girls to realise that G-A-Y is a lesbian and gay club so there's only one direction and that's no direction for them".

In 2016, Joseph was also accused of racism after blaming a rise in crime in Soho on "Somalians"; this led to criticism from Black and South Asian LGBT groups.

In March 2019, staff refused comedian Rosie Jones, who has cerebral palsy, entry into one of the G-A-Y nightclubs after they believed she was drunk. Mr Joseph later apologised on Twitter.

In November 2024, G-A-Y venue Heaven was temporarily closed by Westminster City Council after a member security staff was arrested for the rape of a woman in the queue. In December 2024, the venue reopened after a full licensing hearing. In May 2025, the charged member of staff was found not guilty of rape at Southwark Crown Court.

== Performances ==
Saturday nights at G-A-Y/Heaven have seen many performances from a wide selection of artists and genres. Most frequently, drag queens from across the international community perform on Saturday nights, however, G-A-Y is often also visited by mainstream musicians. Artists that have appeared at G-A-Y/Heaven include:

- Anastacia
- B*Witched
- Britney Spears
- Ellie Goulding
- Enrique Iglesias
- Kylie Minogue
- Lady Gaga
- Leona Lewis
- Loreen
- Madonna
- Marina and the Diamonds
- McFly
- Olly Murs
- One Direction
- Sophie Ellis-Bextor
- The Human League

== The G-A-Y Album ==
In 2000, a 40 track compilation album was released, featuring songs from some of the artists who had appeared at G-A-Y. A promotional campaign took place in the weeks leading up to release, including television and radio advertisements, a nationwide poster campaign and magazine advertisements in both the gay and teen press.

On Saturday 1 July 2000, a show was held at G-A-Y to promote the release of the album. Seven acts who appeared on the album performed. These acts were Shola Ama, All Saints, Bananarama, Dina Carroll, Billie Piper, Honeyz and Louise. Each act performed only one song, apart from Louise, who also performed her new single "2 Faced".

The G-A-Y album was released on Monday 3 July 2000 and peaked at number 18 in the UK compilations chart

== See also ==
- Heaven (nightclub)
- London Astoria
