= Turnmills =

London warehouse building

Coordinates: 51°31′19.38″N 00°06′21.24″W

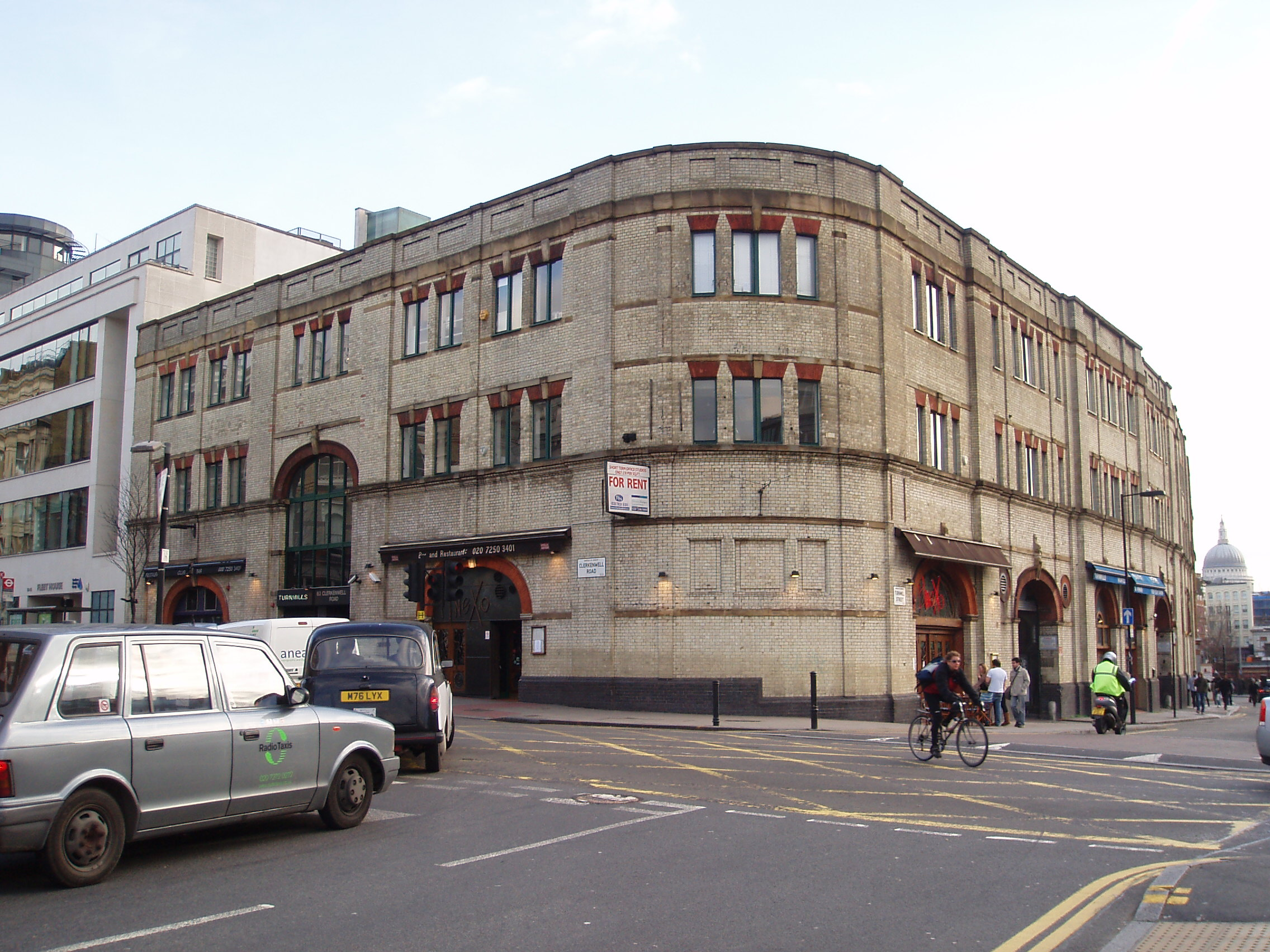
- Turnmills in January 2008, before its demolition
- Interactive map of the Turnmills area

General information
- Location: Clerkenwell, London, England
- Opened: 1886
- Demolished: 2011

Other information
- Seating capacity: 1,000+

The Turnmills building was a warehouse originally on the corner of Turnmill Street and Clerkenwell Road in the London Borough of Islington. It became a bar in the 1980s, then a nightclub. The club closed in 2008 and the building was later demolished, replaced with an office building.

== History ==
The Victorian building opened in 1886 and was originally used as a warehouse and stables by the Great Northern Railway Company. The building later became a warehouse for Booth's Dry Gin distillery before changing hands in 1985 and becoming a bar. The Clerkenwell area was well known for its gin distilleries during the Victorian era. Gordon's Gin distillery was originally sited in Goswell Road/Moreland Street, EC1, not far from Turnmills.

In a bid to try to save the building from demolition, various objections were put forward to Islington Council. William Palin, secretary of Save Britain's Heritage, said that "It may not be as architecturally stunning as the Sessions House across the road but it’s a really good-quality commercial and industrial building. It’s a good example of an old building that’s been successfully re-used in a number of ways."

Although English Heritage argued that the building possessed historic and aesthetic value, the building was finally deemed not to be of considerable significance to be saved from the wrecking ball. The building finally closed on 24 March 2008.

== Club ==
In 1985 John Newman purchased the lease on the building and opened a bar/restaurant on the site. In 1990, the venue evolved into a nightclub. The first successful club night held at Turnmills was Xanadu, run and co-hosted by London club promoters Robert Pereno and Laurence Malice.

The venue was the first to obtain a 24-hour alcohol licence in the UK, spearheading the move to all-night clubbing in the 1990s and became the home of several club nights including Trade, the first legal after-hours club in Britain.

== Club nights ==
=== Monday nights ===
- The Well (1998): Progressive trance music.

=== Tuesday nights ===
- DJ MARY MC & Beautiful Friends. (1993). Mary Mc Caughey with special guest DJs.

=== Thursday nights ===
- Essence. (Autumn/winter 1992/3)
- Twister. (2000-moved to Saturdays with Roach 2001–2002

=== Friday nights ===
- The Gallery (in-house event) playing progressive house, trance and techno.

=== Saturday nights ===
- Xanadu – co-hosted and run by Robert Pereno & Laurence Malice
- Heavenly Social.
- Trade (1990–2002 weekly, actually opened 4am Sunday Mornings) – hosted and run by Laurence Malice.
- Smartie Partie (2003–March 2008), monthly resident. Was suspended indefinitely in 2008 following a legal dispute with Nestlé over use of the trademark "Smarties".
- City Loud (3rd Saturday of each month)—House music.
- Release Yourself presented by Roger Sanchez (various parties, 2002–2007)
- Elements (2001).
- Roach (2002–2003), Tom Stephan hosted a monthly deep & tech session.

=== Sunday nights ===
- FF (1989–1996)
- Warriors (1996–1997) originally run by Buffalo, Spike, Taz and DJ Lord Kaos (Nursie).
- Melt (1997–1999) Techno, Nu-Nrg Club.
- Habit (2000–2001)

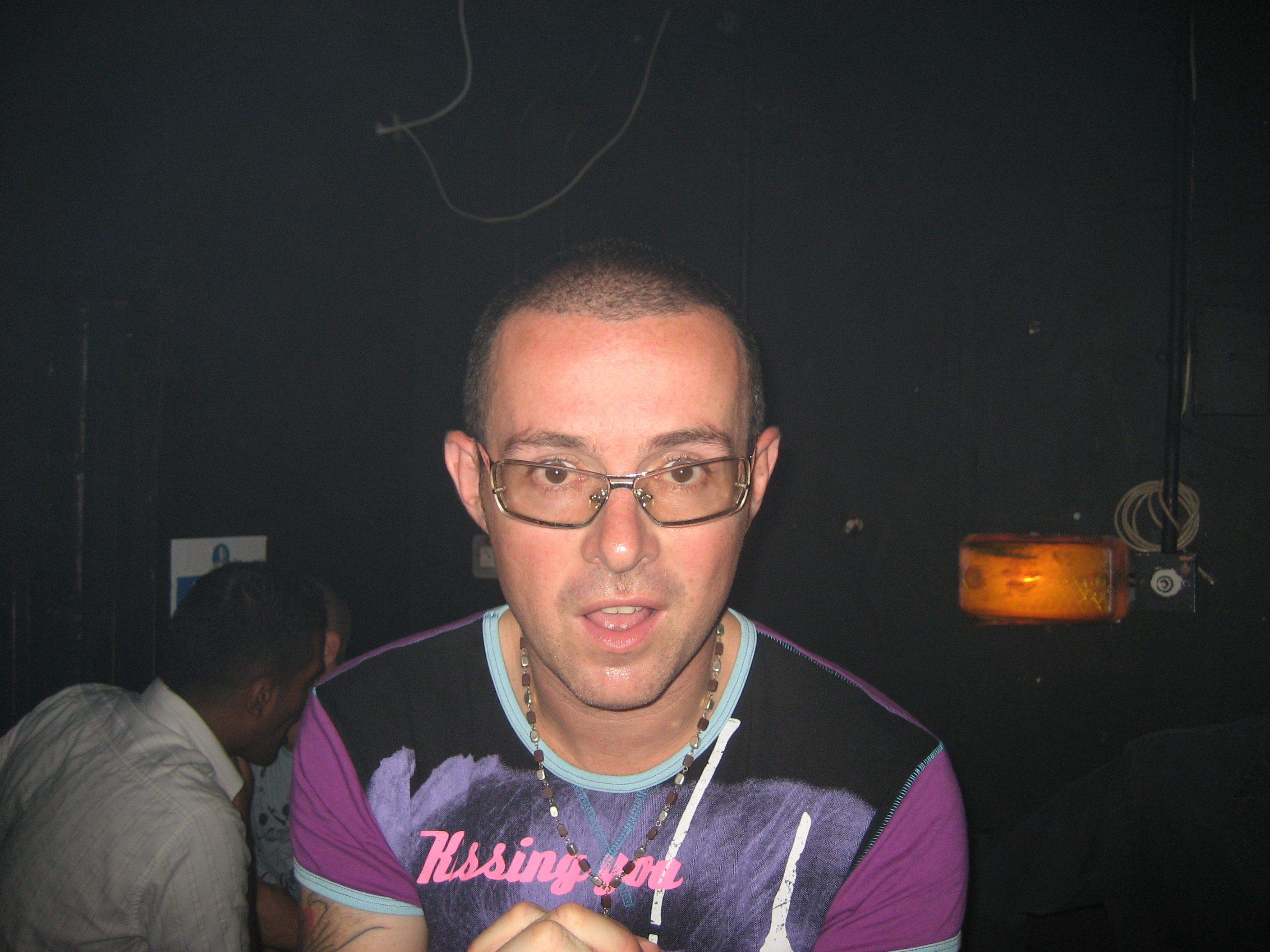
Judge Jules at 'The Gallery'. Turnmills – Friday 22 September 2006.

Turnmills Laser Light Show – 6 May 2006.

== Closure ==
On 24 January 2008, Danny Newman announced the building would close on 23 March 2008 as a clubbing venue, due to the expiry of the lease on the building. The building was later demolished and a new office building (despite objections) was built in its place. Publicis Sapient are now located in the new building.

== See also ==
- List of electronic dance music venues
- Afterhour clubs
- Superclub
