= Country Hits (Anne Murray album) =

Compilation album by Anne Murray
- Released: 1987
- Genre: Country
- Length: 46:05
- Label: Capitol Records
- Producer: Brian Ahern

Anne Murray chronology
Harmony (1987)	Country Hits (1987)	As I Am (1988)

Professional ratings
Review scores
Source	Rating
AllMusic	3/5 stars

Country Hits is the fifth compilation album by Anne Murray, released in 1987 by Capitol Records.

== Track listing ==
No.	Title	Writer(s)	Original album	Length
1.	"Cotton Jenny"	Gordon Lightfoot	Talk It Over in the Morning (1971)	3:01
2.	"He Thinks I Still Care"	Dickey Lee Lipscomb	Danny's Song (1973)	2:52
3.	"Son of a Rotten Gambler"	Chip Taylor	Love Song (1974)	3:06
4.	"Walk Right Back"	Sonny Curtis	Let's Keep It That Way (1978)	2:44
5.	"Lucky Me"	Charlie Black; Rory Michael Bourke	Somebody's Waiting (1980)	3:04
6.	"Blessed Are The Believers"	Charlie Black; Rory Michael Bourke; Sandy Pinkard	Where Do You Go When You Dream (1981)	2:40
7.	"It's All I Can Do"	Archie Jordan; Richard Leigh	Where Do You Go When You Dream	2:49
8.	"Another Sleepless Night"	Charlie Black; Rory Michael Bourke	Where Do You Go When You Dream	3:06
9.	"Hey! Baby"	Margaret Cobb; Bruce Channel	The Hottest Night of the Year (1982)	2:35
10.	"Somebody's Always Saying Goodbye"	Bob McDill	The Hottest Night of the Year	3:24
11.	"A Little Good News"	Charlie Black; Rory Michael Bourke; Tommy Rocco	A Little Good News (1983)	3:10
12.	"Just Another Woman in Love"	Patti Ryan; Wanda Mallette	A Little Good News	2:55
13.	"Nobody Loves Me Like You Do" (duet with Dave Loggins)	James Dunne; Pamela Phillips	Heart over Mind (1984)	3:49
14.	"Time Don't Run Out on Me"	Gerry Goffin; Carole King	Heart over Mind	3:36
15.	"I Don't Think I'm Ready for You"	Steve Dorff; Snuff Garrett; Milton Brown; Billy Ray Reynolds	Heart over Mind	3:14
Total length:				46:05

All track information and credits were taken from the CD liner notes.
