= The Best... So Far (Anne Murray album) =

Greatest hits album by Anne Murray
- Released: November 29, 1994
- Genre: Country
- Length: 64:52
- Label: SBK/EMI Records
- Producer: Brian Ahern; David Foster; Anne Murray; Jim Ed Norman; Tommy West

Anne Murray chronology
Croonin' (1993)	The Best... So Far (1994)	Anne Murray (1996)

Professional ratings
Review scores
Source	Rating
AllMusic	4.5/5 stars

The Best... So Far is a greatest hits album by Canadian country artist Anne Murray. It was released by Capitol Records on November 29, 1994. The album peaked at number 2 on the RPM Country Albums chart.

This disc was certified Platinum by the RIAA for United States sales of over a million copies.

== Track listing ==
No.	Title	Writer(s)	Length
1.	"Snowbird"	Gene MacLellan	2:10
2.	"Now and Forever (You and Me)"	David Foster, Randy Goodrum, Jim Vallance	4:16
3.	"Danny's Song"	Kenny Loggins	3:06
4.	"Nobody Loves Me Like You Do"	James Dunne, Pamela Phillips	3:51
5.	"A Love Song"	D. L. George, Kenny Loggins	2:48
6.	"Time Don't Run Out on Me"	Gerry Goffin, Carole King	3:41
7.	"You Won't See Me"	John Lennon, Paul McCartney	4:04
8.	"Just Another Woman in Love"	Patti Ryan, Wanda Mallette	2:55
9.	"You Needed Me"	Randy Goodrum	3:39
10.	"A Little Good News"	Tommy Rocco, Charlie Black, Rory Michael Bourke	3:07
11.	"I Just Fall in Love Again"	Steve Dorff, Larry Herbstritt, Gloria Sklerov, Harry Lloyd	2:50
12.	"Somebody's Always Saying Goodbye"	Bob McDill	3:25
13.	"Broken Hearted Me"	Goodrum	3:56
14.	"Could I Have This Dance"	Wayland Holyfield, Bob House	3:16
15.	"Daydream Believer"	John Stewart	2:29
16.	"Another Sleepless Night"	Black, Bourke	3:06
17.	"Shadows in the Moonlight"	Black, Bourke	3:29
18.	"Blessed Are the Believers"	Black, Bourke, Sandy Pinkard	2:41
19.	"Make Love to Me"	George Brunies, Alan Copeland, Paul Mares, Walter Melrose, Bill Norvas, Ben Pollack, Leon Roppolo, Mel Stitzel	3:52
20.	"Over You"	Byron Hill, Tony Hiller	3:11

== Chart performance ==
Chart (1994)	Peak position
Canadian RPM Country Albums	2

=== Year-end charts ===
Chart (2001)	Position
Canadian Country Albums (Nielsen SoundScan)	78
