= List of UK top-ten singles in 1984 =

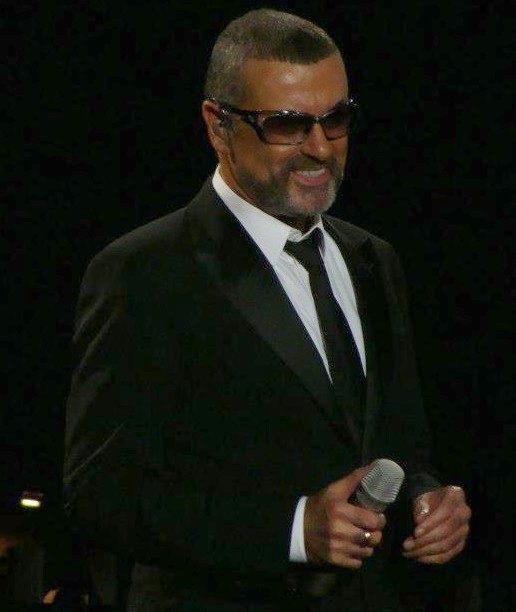
George Michael (pictured in 2011) had a total of five top 10 singles in 1984, the most of any artist. These included two number-ones with his group Wham!; "Wake Me Up Before You Go-Go" and "Freedom", as well as his chart-topping solo hit "Careless Whisper". He was also one of the many featured vocalists on the year's best selling single, "Do They Know It's Christmas?" by Band Aid.

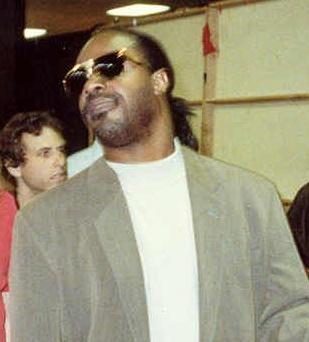
Stevie Wonder (pictured in 1990) had the second best selling single of the year with "I Just Called to Say I Love You", which spent six weeks at number-one and lasted 11 weeks in the top 10. The single features in the film The Woman in Red and earned Wonder the Academy Award for Best Original Song.

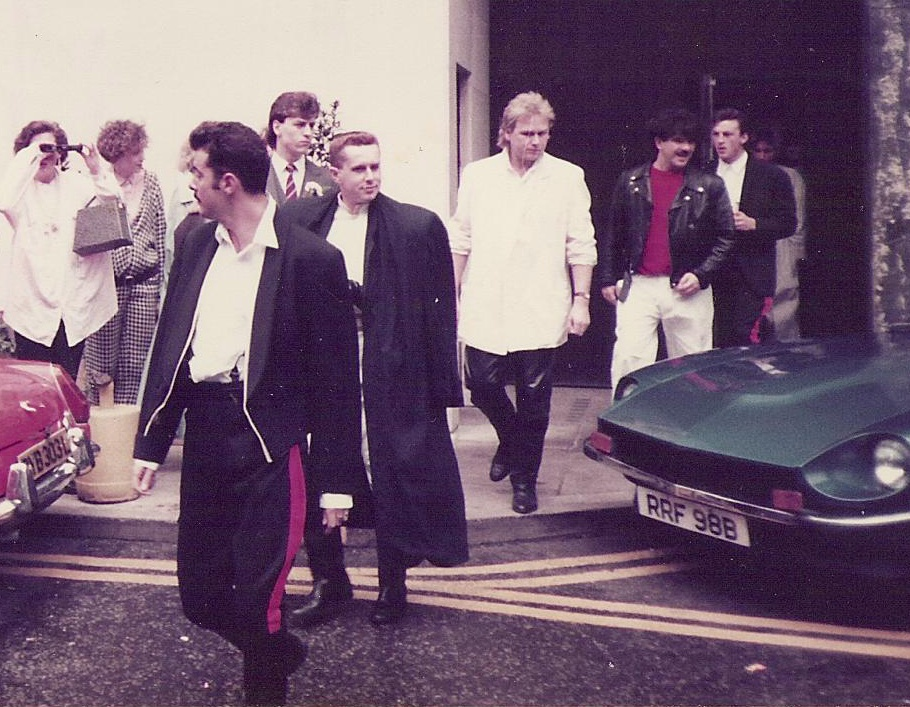
Liverpool band Frankie Goes to Hollywood reached number-one in January 1984 with their debut single "Relax", although the record was banned by the BBC because of its controversial lyrics. The group's next two singles, "Two Tribes" and "The Power of Love", also reached the top of the charts, making Frankie Goes to Hollywood only the second act to reach number-one with their first three releases. The first act to achieve this feat was another Liverpool group, Gerry and the Pacemakers, in 1963.

The UK Singles Chart is one of many music charts compiled by the Official Charts Company that calculates the best-selling singles of the week in the United Kingdom. Before 2004, the chart was only based on the sales of physical singles. This list shows singles that peaked in the Top 10 of the UK Singles Chart during 1984, as well as singles which peaked in 1983 and 1985 but were in the top 10 in 1984. The entry date is when the single appeared in the top 10 for the first time (week ending, as published by the Official Charts Company, which is six days after the chart is announced).

One-hundred and forty-two singles were in the top ten in 1984. Eight singles from 1983 remained in the top 10 for several weeks at the beginning of the year, while "Like a Virgin" by Madonna and "Shout" by Tears for Fears were both released in 1984 but did not reach their peak until 1985. "Islands in the Stream" by Kenny Rogers & Dolly Parton, "Marguerita Time" by Status Quo and "Tell Her About It" by Billy Joel were the singles from 1983 to reach their peak in 1984. Sixty-seven artists scored multiple entries in the top 10 in 1984. Cyndi Lauper, Frankie Goes to Hollywood, Madonna, Prince and The Smiths were among the many artists who achieved their first UK charting top 10 single in 1984.

The 1983 Christmas number-one, an a capella cover of Yazoo's "Only You" by The Flying Pickets, remained at number-one for the first week of 1984. The first new number-one single of the year was "Pipes of Peace" by Paul McCartney. Overall, fifteen different singles peaked at number-one in 1984, with George Michael (4) having the most singles hit that position.

== Background ==
=== Multiple entries ===
One-hundred and forty-two singles charted in the top 10 in 1984, with one-hundred and thirty-five singles reaching their peak this year.

Sixty-seven artists scored multiple entries in the top 10 in 1984. George Michael secured the record for most top 10 hits in 1984 with five hit singles.

Chaka Khan was one of a number of artists with two top-ten entries, including the number-one single "I Feel for You". Alison Moyet, Cyndi Lauper, Eurythmics, Michael Jackson and Slade were among the other artists who had multiple top 10 entries in 1984.

=== Chart debuts ===
Forty-three artists achieved their first top 10 single in 1984, either as a lead or featured artist. This includes the charity group Band Aid (made up of chart acts but charting together for the first time). Of these, eight went on to record another hit single that year: Alison Moyet, Break Machine, Bronski Beat, Chaka Khan, Cyndi Lauper, Hazell Dean, Madonna and Prince. Frankie Goes to Hollywood and Nik Kershaw both had two other entries in their breakthrough year.

The following table (collapsed on desktop site) does not include acts who had previously charted as part of a group and secured their first top 10 solo single.

Artist	Number of top 10s	First entry	Chart position	Other entries
Frankie Goes to Hollywood	3	"Relax"	1	"Two Tribes" (1), "The Power of Love" (1)
Joe Fagin	1	"That's Livin' Alright"	3	—
Cyndi Lauper	2	"Girls Just Want to Have Fun"	2	"Time After Time" (3)
China Crisis	1	"Wishful Thinking"	9	—
Matthew Wilder	1	"Break My Stride"	4	—
Fiction Factory	1	"(Feels Like) Heaven"	6	—
Madonna	2	"Holiday"	6	"Like a Virgin" (3) ^{[A]}
Juan Martín	1	"Love Theme From The Thorn Birds"	10	—
Nena	1	"99 Red Balloons"	1	—
Nik Kershaw	3	"Wouldn't It Be Good"	4	"I Won't Let the Sun Go Down on Me" (2), "The Riddle" (3)
Rockwell	1	"Somebody's Watching Me"	6	—
Break Machine	2	"Street Dance"	3	"Break Dance Party" (9)
Van Halen	1	"Jump"	7	—
Michael Hartley	1	"The Music of Torvill and Dean (EP)"	9	—
The Michael Reed Orchestra	1	"The Music of Torvill and Dean (EP)"	9	—
The Weather Girls	1	"It's Raining Men"	2	—
Sade	1	"Your Love Is King"	6	—
Rufus	1	"Ain't Nobody"	8	—
Chaka Khan	2	"Ain't Nobody"	8	"I Feel for You" (7)
Scritti Politti	1	"Wood Beez (Pray Like Aretha Franklin)"	10	—
Hazell Dean	2	"Searchin' (I Gotta Find a Man)"	6	"Whatever I Do (Wherever I Go)" (4)
Evelyn Thomas	1	"High Energy"	5	—
The Smiths	1	"Heaven Knows I'm Miserable Now"	10	—
Bronski Beat	2	"Smalltown Boy"	3	"Why?" (6)
Ollie & Jerry	1	"Breakin'... There's No Stopping Us"	5	—
Neil	1	"Hole in My Shoe"	2	—
Prince	2	"When Doves Cry"	4	"Purple Rain" (8)
The Bluebells	1	"Young at Heart"	8	—
Alison Moyet	2	"Love Resurrection"	10	"All Cried Out" (8)
Trevor Walters	1	"Stuck on You"	9	—
Miami Sound Machine	1	"Dr. Beat"	6	—
Ray Parker Jr.	1	"Ghostbusters"	2	—
Alphaville	1	"Big in Japan"	8	—
The Revolution	1	"Purple Rain"	8	—
Giorgio Moroder	1	"Together in Electric Dreams"	3	—
John Waite	1	"Missing You"	9	—
Julian Lennon	1	"Too Late for Goodbyes	6	—
Jim Diamond	1	"I Should Have Known Better"	1	—
ZZ Top	1	"Gimme All Your Lovin'"	10	—
The Frog Chorus	1	"We All Stand Together"	3	—
Band Aid	1	"Do They Know It's Christmas?"	1	—
Jody Watley	1	"Do They Know It's Christmas?"	1	—
Toy Dolls	1	"Nellie the Elephant"	4	—

Notes

Snowy White joined Thin Lizzy as a permanent member between 1980 and 1982, with whom he reached the top 10 with the single "Killer on the Loose". His only top 10 single as a solo artist was "Bird of Paradise" which peaked at number 6 in January 1984. Phil Fearon had previously been credited as Galaxy featuring Phil Fearon but for 1984's "What Do I Do" and "Everybody's Laughing" he was credited as Phil Fearon and Galaxy. Similarly, "The Special AKA" were alternatively known as The Specials and had several top 10 singles under this name before "Nelson Mandela" reached number 9 in April 1984.

Grandmaster Flash and the Furious Five frontman Melle Mel took "White Lines (Don't Do It)" to number 7 in July 1984. The group had reached number 8 with "The Message" in 1982. George Michael debuted with "Careless Whisper" in August 1984, the first credited hit single separate from Wham!. The song spent three weeks at number-one. Queen's Freddie Mercury first top 10 single as a solo artist, "Love Kills", got to a high of number 10.

Philip Oakey was the lead singer in The Human League, who had debuted in 1981 with three top 10 singles including "Don't You Want Me". His collaboration with Giorgio Moroder marked the first single to reach the top 10 in his own right. Limahl had been part of Kajagoogoo until his sacking in 1983, his biggest song with the band "Too Shy" reaching the top of the charts. His first solo track was the theme to the film The NeverEnding Story. Ray Parker Jr. had his first and only top 10 single this year, but he did appear on the American single release for a song he wrote, "You See the Trouble with Me" with Barry White in 1976.

Charity collective Band Aid was made up of many artists who had charted previously in their own right, including David Bowie, George Michael, Marilyn, Midge Ure, Paul McCartney, Paul Young and Phil Collins. Other singers had formerly only performed as part of a group and "Do They Know It's Christmas?" was their first credit outside their band. This included Robert "Kool" Bell, James "J.T." Taylor, Dennis Thomas (all Kool and the Gang), Bono, Adam Clayton (both U2), Chris Cross (Ultravox), Bob Geldof, Johnny Fingers, Simon Crowe (all The Boomtown Rats), Sarah Dallin, Siobhan Fahey, Keren Woodward (all Bananarama), Boy George, Jon Moss (both Culture Club), Glenn Gregory, Martyn Ware (both Heaven 17), Tony Hadley, Gary Kemp, John Keeble, Martin Kemp, Steve Norman (all Spandau Ballet), Simon Le Bon, Andy Taylor, Roger Taylor, Nick Rhodes, John Taylor (all Duran Duran), Rick Parfitt, Francis Rossi (both Status Quo), Sting (The Police), Paul Weller (The Style Council), Stuart Adamson, Mark Brzezicki, Tony Butler and Bruce Watson (all Big Country) and Holly Johnson (Frankie Goes to Hollywood).

=== Songs from films ===
Original songs from various films entered the top 10 throughout the year. These included "Against All Odds (Take a Look at Me Now)" (Against All Odds), "Footloose" & "Let's Hear It for the Boy" (Footloose), "Purple Rain" & "When Doves Cry" (Purple Rain), "I Just Called To Say I Love You" (The Woman In Red), "Ghostbusters" (Ghostbusters), "Love Kills" (Giorgio Moroder Presents Metropolis), "Together in Electric Dreams" (Electric Dreams), "The NeverEnding Story" (The NeverEnding Story), "Sexcrime (Nineteen Eighty-Four)" (Nineteen Eighty-Four) and "We All Stand Together" (Rupert and the Frog Song).

=== Charity singles ===
A group of musicians came together under the banner of Band Aid and released the single "Do They Know It's Christmas?" in aid of the famine in Ethiopia. The song featured artists including Bob Geldof, Paul Young, Boy George and Paul Weller. It was the Christmas number-one single for 1984, topping the chart for five weeks from 15 December 1984 (week ending).

=== Best-selling singles ===
Band Aid had the best-selling single of the year with "Do They Know It's Christmas?". The single spent seven weeks in the top 10 (including five weeks at number one), sold over 2.98 million copies and was certified platinum by the BPI. "I Just Called to Say I Love You" by Stevie Wonder came in second place, selling more than 1.7 million copies and losing out by around 1.28 million sales. Frankie Goes to Hollywood's "Relax", "Two Tribes" from the same act, and "Careless Whisper" by George Michael made up the top five. Songs by Wham! ("Last Christmas"/"Everything She Wants"), Lionel Richie, Black Lace, Ray Parker Jr. and Wham! ("Freedom") were also in the top ten best-selling singles of the year.

== Top-ten singles ==
Symbol	Meaning
‡	Single peaked in 1983 but still in chart in 1984.
♦	Single released in 1984 but peaked in 1985.
(#)	Year-end top-ten single position and rank
Entered	The date that the single first appeared in the chart.
Peak	Highest position that the single reached in the UK Singles Chart.

Entered (week ending)	Weeks in top 10	Single	Artist	Peak	Peak reached (week ending)	Weeks at peak
Singles in 1983
26 November 1983	8	"Love of the Common People" ‡	Paul Young	2	3 December 1983	3
3 December 1983	7	"Hold Me Now" ‡	Thompson Twins	4	10 December 1983	1
3 December 1983	7	"Only You" ‡	The Flying Pickets	1	10 December 1983	5
10 December 1983	5	"My Oh My" ‡	Slade	2	24 December 1983	3
17 December 1983	5	"Victims" ‡	Culture Club	3	24 December 1983	2
17 December 1983	6	"Tell Her About It"	Billy Joel	4	14 January 1984	1
24 December 1983	5	"Marguerita Time"	Status Quo	3	14 January 1984	1
24 December 1983	5	"Islands in the Stream"	Kenny Rogers & Dolly Parton	7	7 January 1984	1
Singles in 1984
7 January 1984	5	"Pipes of Peace"	Paul McCartney	1	14 January 1984	2
7 January 1984	4	"What Is Love?"	Howard Jones	2	14 January 1984	1
14 January 1984	19	"Relax" (#3) ^{[B]}	Frankie Goes to Hollywood	1	28 January 1984	5
21 January 1984	5	"That's Livin' Alright"	Joe Fagin	3	28 January 1984	2
21 January 1984	2	"A Rockin' Good Way"	Shakin' Stevens & Bonnie Tyler	5	21 January 1984	2
21 January 1984	2	"Bird of Paradise"	Snowy White	6	21 January 1984	1
21 January 1984	1	"Running with the Night"	Lionel Richie	9	21 January 1984	1
28 January 1984	1	"Nobody Told Me"	John Lennon	6	28 January 1984	1
28 January 1984	2	"Wonderland"	Big Country	8	28 January 1984	1
28 January 1984	1	"Wishful Thinking"	China Crisis	9	28 January 1984	1
28 January 1984	5	"Girls Just Want to Have Fun"	Cyndi Lauper	2	4 February 1984	1
4 February 1984	5	"Radio Ga Ga"	Queen	2	11 February 1984	2
4 February 1984	4	"Break My Stride"	Matthew Wilder	4	11 February 1984	1
4 February 1984	2	"(Feels Like) Heaven"	Fiction Factory	6	4 February 1984	1
4 February 1984	2	"Here Comes the Rain Again"	Eurythmics	8	4 February 1984	1
4 February 1984	1	"The Killing Moon"	Echo & the Bunnymen	9	4 February 1984	1
11 February 1984	5	"Doctor! Doctor!"	Thompson Twins	3	18 February 1984	2
11 February 1984	2	"Holiday"	Madonna	6	18 February 1984	1
11 February 1984	2	"New Moon on Monday"	Duran Duran	9	11 February 1984	2
18 February 1984	3	"My Ever Changing Moods"	The Style Council	5	25 February 1984	1
18 February 1984	1	"Love Theme From The Thorn Birds" ^{[C]}	Juan Martín	10	18 February 1984	1
25 February 1984	5	"99 Red Balloons" ^{[D]}	Nena	1	3 March 1984	3
25 February 1984	4	"Somebody's Watching Me"	Rockwell	6	3 March 1984	2
25 February 1984	5	"Wouldn't It Be Good"	Nik Kershaw	4	3 March 1984	3
25 February 1984	6	"Joanna"/"Tonight"	Kool & the Gang	2	10 March 1984	2
3 March 1984	3	"An Innocent Man"	Billy Joel	8	3 March 1984	3
3 March 1984	2	"Run Runaway"	Slade	7	10 March 1984	1
10 March 1984	4	"Street Dance"	Break Machine	3	17 March 1984	2
10 March 1984	3	"Jump"	Van Halen	7	17 March 1984	1
17 March 1984	9	"Hello" (#7)	Lionel Richie	1	24 March 1984	6
17 March 1984	2	"The Music of Torvill and Dean (EP)" ^{[E]}	Richard Hartley & The Michael Reed Orchestra	9	7 April 1984	1
24 March 1984	4	"It's Raining Men"	The Weather Girls	2	31 March 1984	1
24 March 1984	3	"What Do I Do"	Phil Fearon & Galaxy	5	31 March 1984	1
24 March 1984	4	"Robert De Niro's Waiting..."	Bananarama	3	31 March 1984	2
24 March 1984	3	"Your Love Is King"	Sade	6	31 March 1984	1
31 March 1984	3	"It's a Miracle"	Culture Club	4	31 March 1984	1
31 March 1984	5	"A Love Worth Waiting For"	Shakin' Stevens	2	7 April 1984	2
31 March 1984	5	"People Are People"	Depeche Mode	4	14 April 1984	1
7 April 1984	5	"You Take Me Up"	Thompson Twins	2	21 April 1984	1
14 April 1984	3	"Glad It's All Over"/"Damned on 45"	Captain Sensible	6	14 April 1984	1
14 April 1984	2	"Nelson Mandela" ^{[F]}	The Special AKA	9	14 April 1984	2
14 April 1984	8	"Against All Odds (Take a Look at Me Now)"	Phil Collins	2	28 April 1984	3
21 April 1984	7	"I Want to Break Free"	Queen	3	28 April 1984	3
21 April 1984	1	"Ain't Nobody"	Rufus & Chaka Khan	8	21 April 1984	1
21 April 1984	1	"Wood Beez (Pray Like Aretha Franklin)"	Scritti Politti	10	21 April 1984	1
28 April 1984	7	"The Reflex"	Duran Duran	1	5 May 1984	4
28 April 1984	1	"(When You Say You Love Somebody) In the Heart"	Kool & the Gang	7	28 April 1984	1
28 April 1984	4	"Locomotion"	Orchestral Manoeuvres in the Dark	5	12 May 1984	1
5 May 1984	5	"Automatic"	The Pointer Sisters	2	19 May 1984	2
5 May 1984	3	"When You're Young and in Love"	The Flying Pickets	7	5 May 1984	2
5 May 1984	3	"Don't Tell Me"	Blancmange	8	5 May 1984	2
5 May 1984	4	"One Love/People Get Ready"	Bob Marley and the Wailers	5	19 May 1984	1
12 May 1984	3	"Footloose"	Kenny Loggins	6	19 May 1984	1
19 May 1984	5	"Let's Hear It for the Boy"	Deniece Williams	2	2 June 1984	2
26 May 1984	7	"Wake Me Up Before You Go-Go"	Wham!	1	2 June 1984	2
26 May 1984	1	"Break Dance Party"	Break Machine	9	26 May 1984	1
26 May 1984	4	"Dancing with Tears in My Eyes"	Ultravox	3	9 June 1984	1
2 June 1984	2	"You're the Best Thing"/"The Big Boss Groove"	The Style Council	5	2 June 1984	1
2 June 1984	1	"I Feel Like Buddy Holly"	Alvin Stardust	7	2 June 1984	1
2 June 1984	2	"Searchin' (I Gotta Find a Man)"	Hazell Dean	6	9 June 1984	1
9 June 1984	3	"Only When You Leave"	Spandau Ballet	3	16 June 1984	1
9 June 1984	3	"Pearl in the Shell"	Howard Jones	7	16 June 1984	1
9 June 1984	3	"High Energy"	Evelyn Thomas	5	16 June 1984	1
9 June 1984	2	"Heaven Knows I'm Miserable Now"	The Smiths	10	9 June 1984	2
16 June 1984	12	"Two Tribes" (#4)	Frankie Goes to Hollywood	1	16 June 1984	9
16 June 1984	4	"Smalltown Boy"	Bronski Beat	3	23 June 1984	1
16 June 1984	3	"Sad Songs (Say So Much)"	Elton John	7	23 June 1984	1
23 June 1984	6	"I Won't Let the Sun Go Down on Me"	Nik Kershaw	2	30 June 1984	1
23 June 1984	3	"Farewell My Summer Love"	Michael Jackson	7	30 June 1984	1
30 June 1984	4	"Jump (For My Love)"	The Pointer Sisters	6	30 June 1984	2
30 June 1984	3	"Breakin'... There's No Stopping Us"	Ollie & Jerry	5	7 July 1984	1
30 June 1984	6	"Time After Time"	Cyndi Lauper	3	14 July 1984	1
7 July 1984	8	"White Lines (Don't Don't Do It)"	Grandmaster Melle Mel	7	28 July 1984	2
14 July 1984	5	"Hole in My Shoe"	Neil	2	21 July 1984	3
14 July 1984	6	"When Doves Cry"	Prince	4	28 July 1984	2
14 July 1984	7	"What's Love Got to Do with It"	Tina Turner	3	11 August 1984	1
21 July 1984	2	"Young at Heart"	The Bluebells	8	28 July 1984	1
28 July 1984	1	"Love Resurrection"	Alison Moyet	10	28 July 1984	1
4 August 1984	2	"It's a Hard Life"	Queen	6	4 August 1984	1
4 August 1984	1	"Down on the Street"	Shakatak	9	4 August 1984	1
4 August 1984	1	"Everybody's Laughing"	Phil Fearon & Galaxy	10	4 August 1984	1
11 August 1984	8	"Careless Whisper" (#5)	George Michael	1	18 August 1984	3
11 August 1984	8	"Agadoo" (#8)	Black Lace	2	18 August 1984	2
11 August 1984	5	"Whatever I Do (Wherever I Go)"	Hazell Dean	4	18 August 1984	1
18 August 1984	5	"Self Control"	Laura Branigan	5	1 September 1984	1
18 August 1984	5	"Like to Get to Know You Well"	Howard Jones	4	25 August 1984	3
25 August 1984	11	"I Just Called to Say I Love You" (#2)	Stevie Wonder	1	8 September 1984	6
25 August 1984	2	"Stuck on You"	Trevor Walters	9	25 August 1984	1
1 September 1984	4	"Passengers"	Elton John	5	8 September 1984	1
1 September 1984	4	"Dr. Beat"	Miami Sound Machine	6	22 September 1984	1
8 September 1984	11	"Ghostbusters" (#9) ^{[BB]}	Ray Parker Jr.	2	22 September 1984	3
8 September 1984	1	"I'll Fly for You"	Spandau Ballet	9	8 September 1984	1
15 September 1984	5	"Pride (In the Name of Love)"	U2	3	29 September 1984	1
15 September 1984	3	"Big in Japan"	Alphaville	8	22 September 1984	1
22 September 1984	3	"Lost in Music (1984 Remix)"	Sister Sledge	4	29 September 1984	1
22 September 1984	1	"Master and Servant"	Depeche Mode	9	22 September 1984	1
29 September 1984	2	"Blue Jean"	David Bowie	6	29 September 1984	1
29 September 1984	3	"Why?"	Bronski Beat	6	6 October 1984	1
29 September 1984	1	"A Letter to You"	Shakin' Stevens	10	29 September 1984	1
6 October 1984	4	"The War Song"	Culture Club	2	13 October 1984	1
6 October 1984	2	"Purple Rain"	Prince & The Revolution	8	6 October 1984	1
6 October 1984	1	"If It Happens Again"	UB40	9	6 October 1984	1
6 October 1984	1	"Love Kills"	Freddie Mercury	10	6 October 1984	1
13 October 1984	7	"Freedom" (#10)	Wham!	1	20 October 1984	3
13 October 1984	3	"Drive"	The Cars	5	13 October 1984	1
13 October 1984	5	"No More Lonely Nights"	Paul McCartney	2	27 October 1984	1
13 October 1984	5	"Together in Electric Dreams"	Giorgio Moroder & Philip Oakey	3	27 October 1984	1
20 October 1984	2	"Shout to the Top!"	The Style Council	7	20 October 1984	1
20 October 1984	1	"I'm Gonna Tear Your Playhouse Down"	Paul Young	9	20 October 1984	1
20 October 1984	3	"Missing You"	John Waite	9	27 October 1984	1
27 October 1984	7	"I Feel for You"	Chaka Khan	1	10 November 1984	3
27 October 1984	4	"All Cried Out"	Alison Moyet	8	27 October 1984	4
3 November 1984	5	"The Wild Boys"	Duran Duran	2	17 November 1984	1
3 November 1984	3	"Too Late for Goodbyes"	Julian Lennon	6	3 November 1984	2
3 November 1984	4	"The Wanderer"	Status Quo	7	3 November 1984	3
10 November 1984	4	"Caribbean Queen (No More Love on the Run)"	Billy Ocean	6	17 November 1984	2
10 November 1984	5	"The NeverEnding Story"	Limahl	4	24 November 1984	1
17 November 1984	5	"I Should Have Known Better"	Jim Diamond	1	1 December 1984	1
17 November 1984	1	"Gimme All Your Lovin'"	ZZ Top	10	17 November 1984	1
24 November 1984	5	"The Riddle"	Nik Kershaw	3	8 December 1984	1
24 November 1984	4	"Sexcrime (Ninety Eighty-Four)"	Eurythmics	4	8 December 1984	1
24 November 1984	2	"Hard Habit to Break"	Chicago	8	24 November 1984	2
1 December 1984	7	"The Power of Love"	Frankie Goes to Hollywood	1	8 December 1984	1
1 December 1984	3	"Teardrops"	Shakin' Stevens	5	8 December 1984	1
8 December 1984	2	"I Won't Run Away"	Alvin Stardust	7	8 December 1984	1
8 December 1984	9	"Like a Virgin" ♦	Madonna	3	12 January 1985	1
8 December 1984	6	"We All Stand Together"	Paul McCartney & The Frog Chorus ^{[F]}	3	22 December 1984	3
15 December 1984	7	"Do They Know It's Christmas?" (#1) ^{[H]}	Band Aid	1	15 December 1984	5
15 December 1984	7	"Last Christmas"/"Everything She Wants" (#6)	Wham!	2	15 December 1984	5
22 December 1984	4	"Nellie the Elephant"	Toy Dolls	4	29 December 1984	1
22 December 1984	2	"Another Rock and Roll Christmas"	Gary Glitter	7	22 December 1984	1
22 December 1984	5	"Everything Must Change"	Paul Young	9	22 December 1984	5
22 December 1984	1	"Do the Conga"	Black Lace	10	22 December 1984	1
29 December 1984	7	"Shout" ♦	Tears for Fears	4	26 January 1985	1

== Entries by artist ==
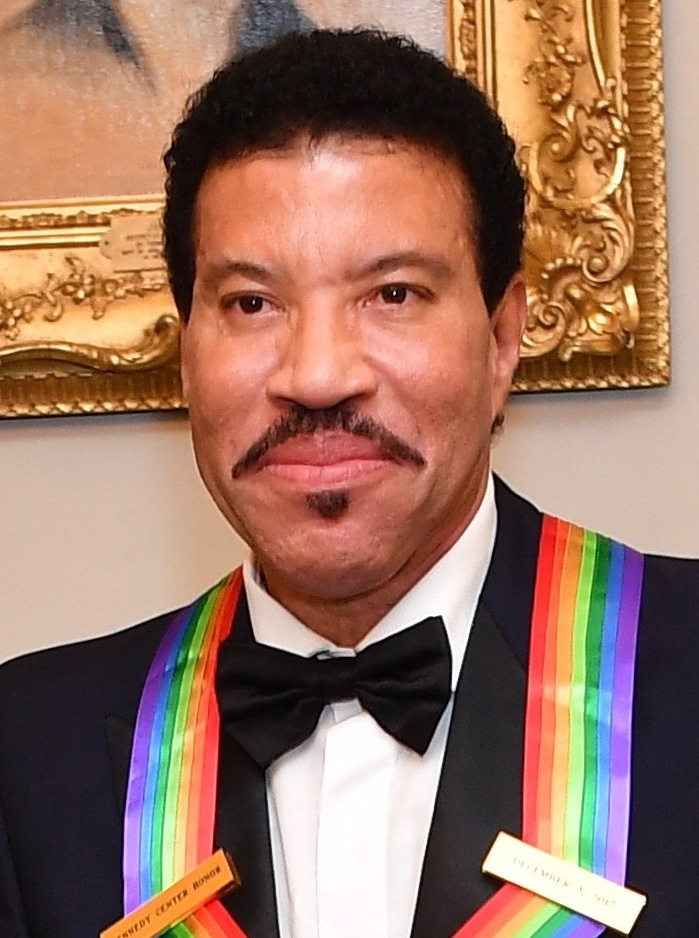
Lionel Richie (pictured in 2017) had two top 10 entries this year, including his only UK number-one single as a solo artist, "Hello", which topped the charts for six consecutive weeks and became the year's seventh best selling single.

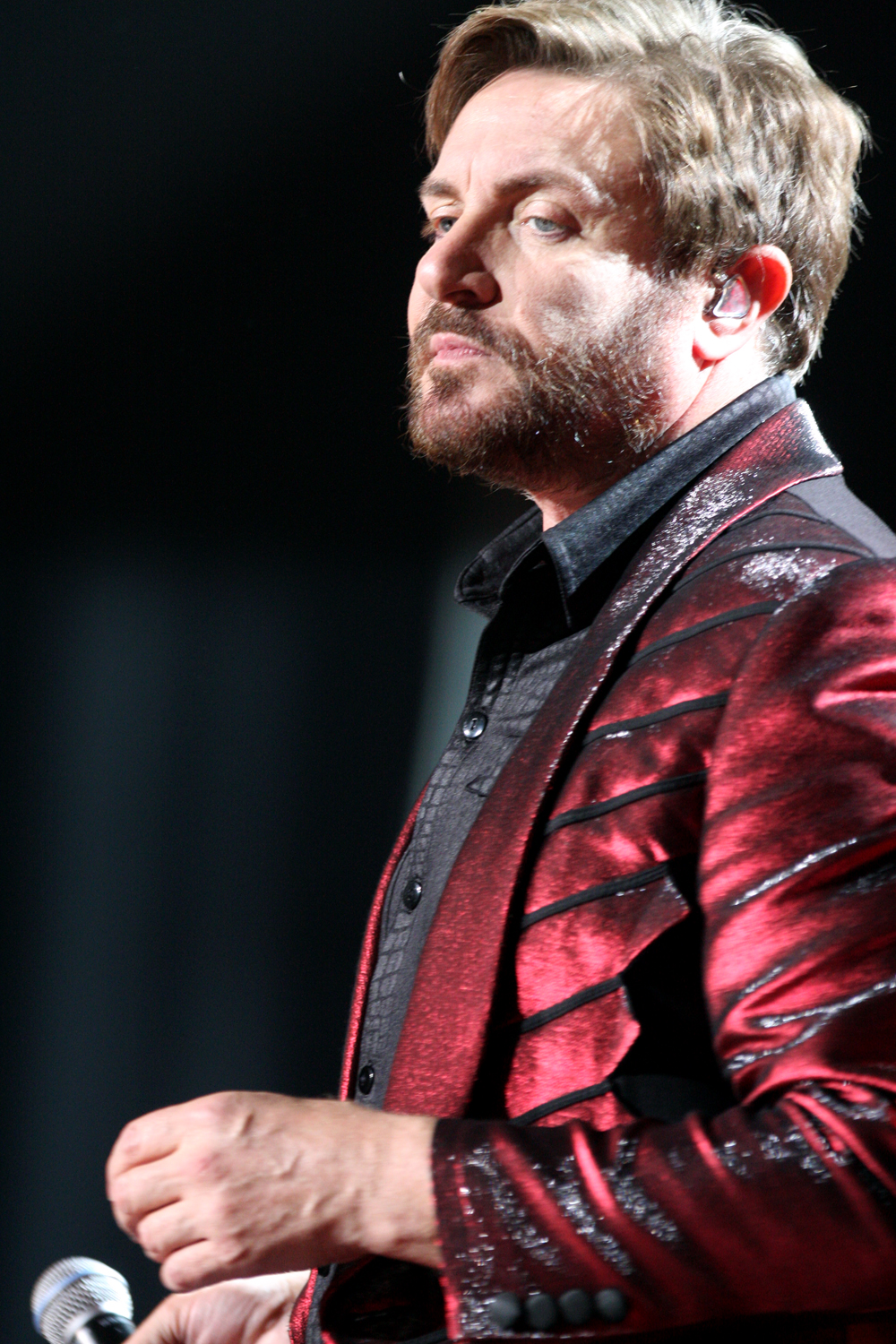
Simon Le Bon (pictured in 2012) and his group Duran Duran had four UK top 10 hits in 1984. As well as reaching number-one for four weeks with "The Reflex", the band members also featured on the chart-topping Band Aid record "Do They Know It's Christmas?".

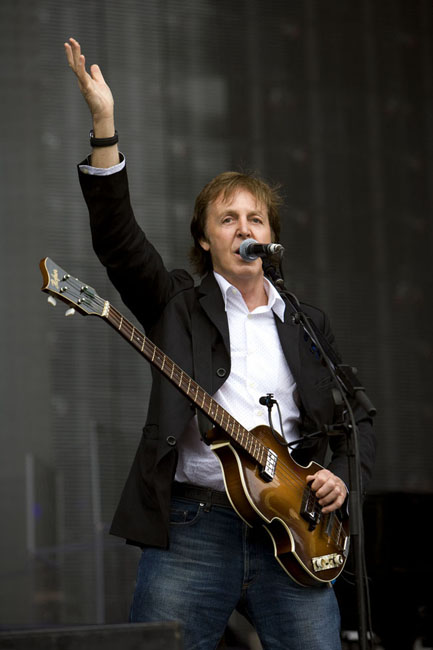
Former Beatle Paul McCartney (pictured in 2000) also achieved four top 10 hits in the UK this year. The most successful of these was his only solo UK number-one single, "Pipes of Peace", which topped the chart in January.

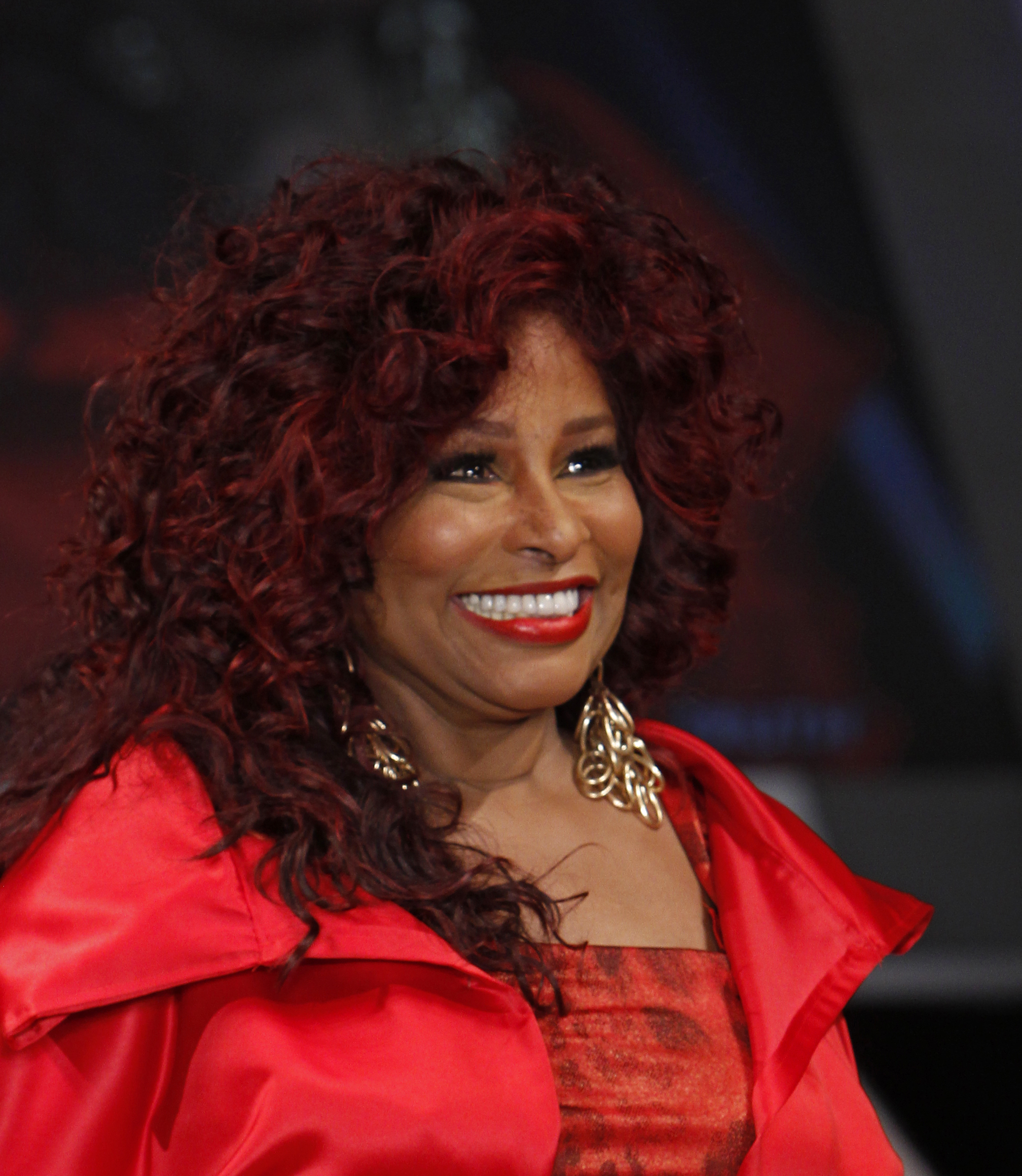
Chaka Khan (pictured in 2012) scored her only UK number-one single in November 1984 with "I Feel for You", which topped the chart for three weeks. The song had been written and originally recorded by Prince in 1979.

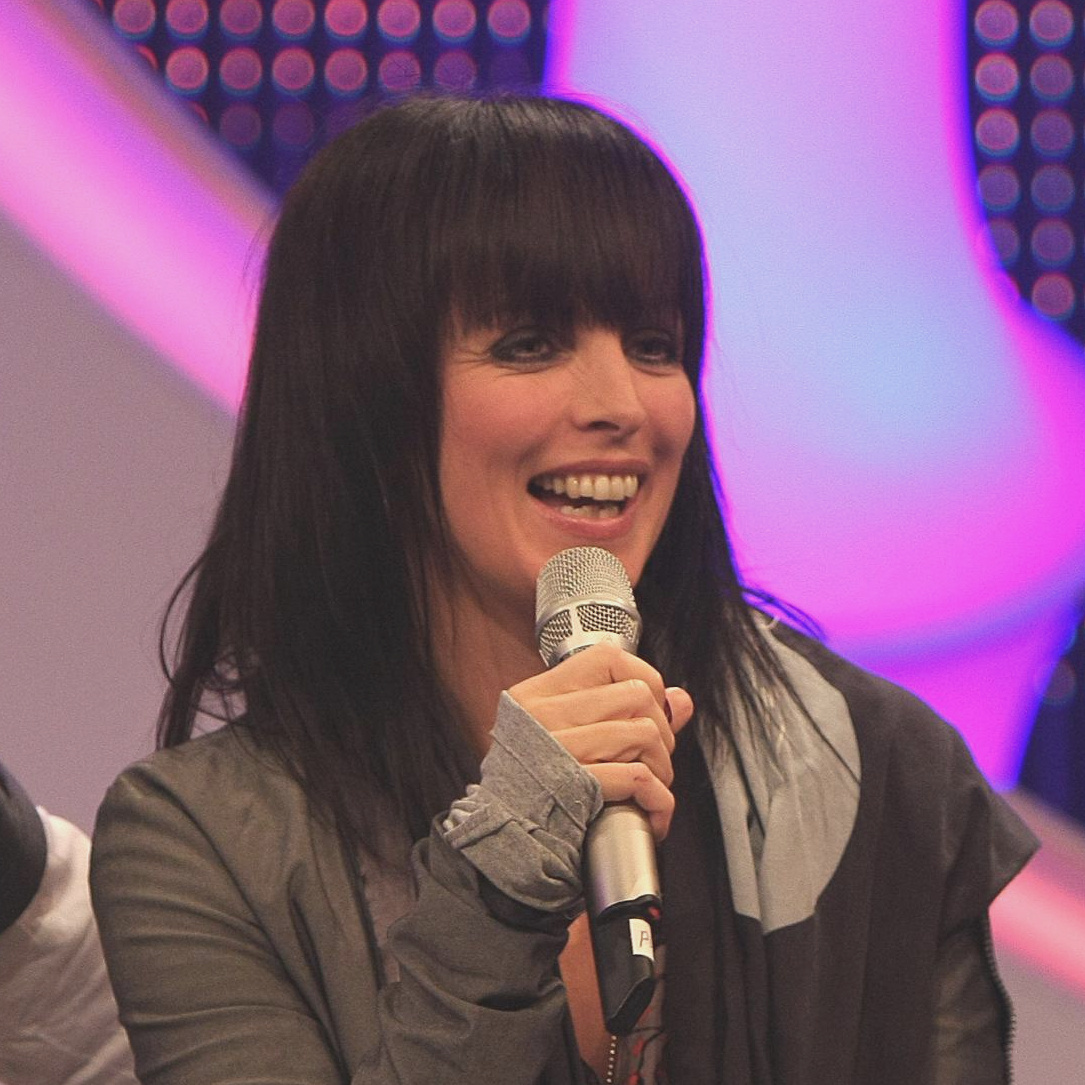
German singer Nena (pictured in 2008) and her group of the same name achieved their one and only UK top 10 hit this year with "99 Red Balloons", which spent three weeks at number-one.

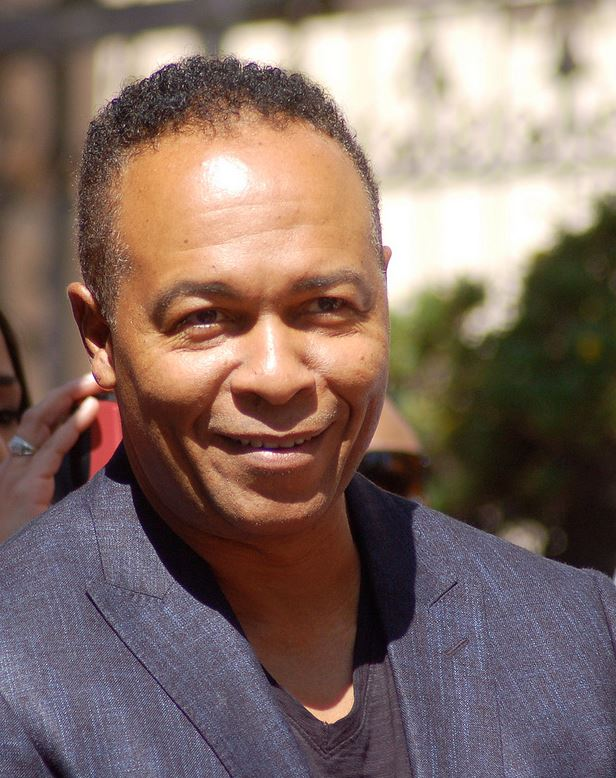
American musician Ray Parker Jr. (pictured in 2013) had one of the most successful singles of 1984 with "Ghostbusters", the theme from the movie of the same name. The song spent a total of 11 non-consecutive weeks in the UK top 10, peaking at number two for three weeks. It ended up as the UK's ninth best selling single of the year.

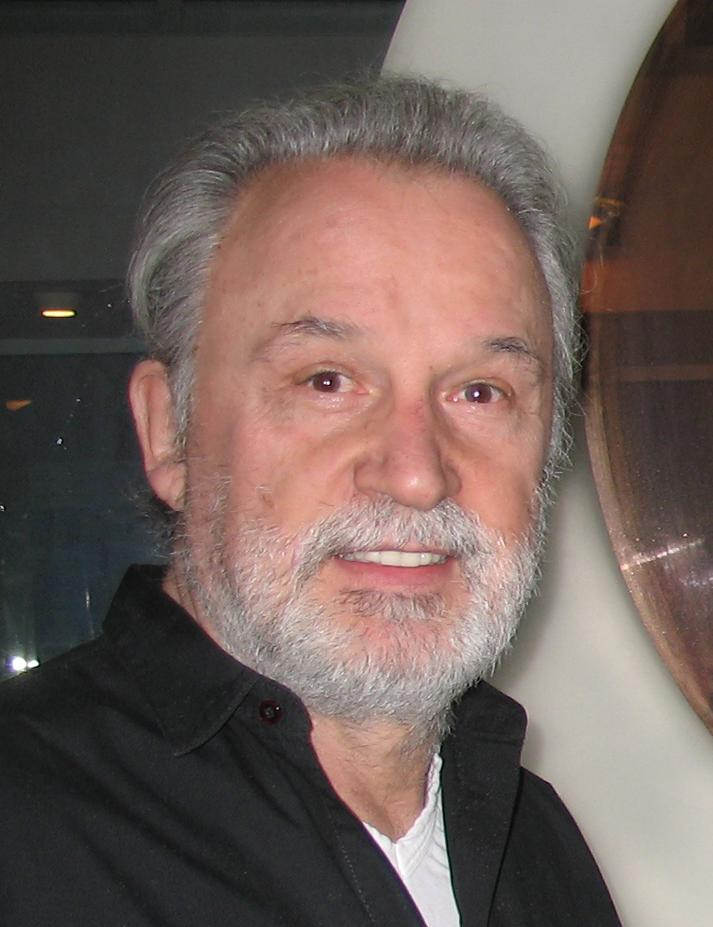
Italian musician and producer Giorgio Moroder (pictured in 2007) scored his only UK top 10 hit as a performer in 1984 with "Together in Electric Dreams", a collaboration with The Human League's lead singer Philip Oakey, which peaked at number three in October.

The following table shows artists who achieved two or more top 10 entries in 1984, including singles that reached their peak in 1983 or 1985. The figures include both main artists and featured artists, while appearances on ensemble charity records are also counted for each artist. The total number of weeks an artist spent in the top ten in 1984 is also shown.

Entries	Artist	Weeks	Singles
5	George Michael ^{[I]}^{[N]}	28	"Careless Whisper", "Do They Know It's Christmas?", "Freedom", "Last Christmas"/"Everything She Wants", "Wake Me Up Before You Go-Go"
4	Andy Taylor ^{[I]}^{[O]}	17	"Do They Know It's Christmas?", "New Moon on Monday", "The Reflex", "The Wild Boys"
4	Boy George ^{[I]}^{[K]}^{[P]}	12	"Do They Know It's Christmas?", "It's a Miracle", "Victims", "The War Song"
4	Freddie Mercury ^{[Q]}	15	"It's a Hard Life", "I Want to Break Free", "Love Kills", "Radio Ga Ga"
4	Holly Johnson ^{[I]}^{[J]}^{[Q]}	39	"Do They Know It's Christmas?", "Relax", "The Power of Love", "Two Tribes"
4	John Taylor ^{[I]}^{[O]}	17	"Do They Know It's Christmas?", "New Moon on Monday", "The Reflex", "The Wild Boys"
4	Jon Moss ^{[I]}^{[K]}^{[P]}	12	"Do They Know It's Christmas?", "It's a Miracle", "Victims", "The War Song"
4	Nick Rhodes ^{[I]}^{[O]}	17	"Do They Know It's Christmas?", "New Moon on Monday", "The Reflex", "The Wild Boys"
4	Paul McCartney ^{[I]}^{[J]}	17	"Do They Know It's Christmas?", "No More Lonely Nights", "Pipes of Peace", "We All Stand Together"
4	Paul Weller ^{[I]}^{[S]}	11	"Do They Know It's Christmas?", "You're the Best Thing"/"The Big Boss Groove", "My Ever Changing Moods", "Shout to the Top"
4	Paul Young ^{[I]}^{[K]}	8	"Do They Know It's Christmas?", "Everything Must Change", "I'm Gonna Tear Your Playhouse Down", "Love of the Common People"
4	Roger Taylor ^{[I]}^{[O]}	17	"Do They Know It's Christmas?", "New Moon on Monday", "The Reflex", "The Wild Boys"
4	Shakin' Stevens	11	"A Letter to You", "A Love Worth Waiting For", "A Rockin' Good Way", "Teardrops"
4	Simon Le Bon ^{[I]}^{[O]}	17	"Do They Know It's Christmas?", "New Moon on Monday", "The Reflex", "The Wild Boys"
3	Culture Club ^{[K]}	9	"It's a Miracle", "Victims", "The War Song"
3	Dennis Thomas ^{[I]}^{[V]}	4	"Do They Know It's Christmas?", "Joanna"/"Tonight", "(When You Say You Love Somebody) In the Heart"
3	Duran Duran	14	"New Moon on Monday", "The Reflex", "The Wild Boys"
3	Francis Rossi ^{[I]}^{[T]}	10	"Do They Know It's Christmas?", "Marguerita Time", "The Wanderer"
3	Frankie Goes to Hollywood	36	"Relax", "The Power of Love", "Two Tribes"
3	Gary Kemp ^{[I]}^{[U]}	7	"Do They Know It's Christmas?", "I'll Fly for You", "Only When You Leave"
3	James "JT" Taylor ^{[I]}^{[V]}	10	"Do They Know It's Christmas?", "Joanna"/"Tonight", "(When You Say You Love Somebody) In the Heart"
3	John Keeble ^{[I]}^{[U]}	7	"Do They Know It's Christmas?", "I'll Fly for You", "Only When You Leave"
3	Martin Kemp ^{[I]}^{[U]}	7	"Do They Know It's Christmas?", "I'll Fly for You", "Only When You Leave"
3	Nik Kershaw	16	"I Won't Let the Sun Go Down on Me", "The Riddle", "Wouldn't It Be Good"
3	Rick Parfitt ^{[I]}^{[T]}	10	"Do They Know It's Christmas?", "Marguerita Time", "The Wanderer"
3	Robert "Kool" Bell ^{[I]}^{[V]}	10	"Do They Know It's Christmas?", "Joanna"/"Tonight", "(When You Say You Love Somebody) In the Heart"
3	Steve Norman ^{[I]}^{[U]}	7	"Do They Know It's Christmas?", "I'll Fly for You", "Only When You Leave"
3	The Style Council^{[R]}	8	"You're the Best Thing"/"The Big Boss Groove", "My Ever Changing Moods", "Shout to the Top"
3	Thompson Twins ^{[K]}	12	"Doctor! Doctor!", "Hold Me Now", "You Take Me Up"
3	Tony Hadley ^{[I]}^{[U]}	7	"Do They Know It's Christmas?", "I'll Fly for You", "Only When You Leave"
3	Wham!	17	"Freedom", "Last Christmas"/"Everything She Wants", "Wake Me Up Before You Go-Go"
2	Adam Clayton ^{[I]}^{[W]}	8	"Do They Know It's Christmas?", "Pride (In the Name of Love)"
2	Alison Moyet	5	"All Cried Out", "Love Resurrection"
2	Alvin Stardust	3	"I Feel Like Buddy Holly", "I Won't Run Away"
2	Billy Joel ^{[L]}	6	"An Innocent Man", "Tell Her About It"
2	Black Lace	9	"Agadoo", "Do the Conga"
2	Bono ^{[I]}^{[W]}	8	"Do They Know It's Christmas?", "Pride (In the Name of Love)"
2	Break Machine	5	"Break Dance Party", "Street Dance"
2	Bronski Beat		"Smalltown Boy", "Why?"
2	Bruce Watson ^{[I]}^{[J]}^{[X]}	5	"Do They Know It's Christmas?", "Wonderland"
2	Chaka Khan	8	"Ain't Nobody", "I Feel for You"
2	Chris Cross ^{[I]}^{[Y]}	7	"Do They Know It's Christmas?", "Dancing with Tears in My Eyes"
2	Cyndi Lauper	11	"Girls Just Want to Have Fun", "Time After Time"
2	David Bowie ^{[J]}	5	"Blue Jean", "Do They Know It's Christmas?"
2	Depeche Mode	6	"Master and Servant", "People Are People"
2	Elton John	7	"Passengers", "Sad Songs Say So Much"
2	Eurythmics	6	"Here Comes the Rain Again", "Sexcrime (Nineteen Eighty-Four)"
2	The Flying Pickets ^{[K]}	5	"Only You", "When You're Young and in Love"
2	Hazell Dean	7	"Searchin' (I Gotta Find a Man)", "Whatever I Do (Wherever I Go)"
2	Keren Woodward ^{[Z]}	7	"Do They Know It's Christmas?", "Robert De Niro's Waiting..."
2	Kool & The Gang	7	"Joanna"/"Tonight", "(When You Say You Love Somebody) In the Heart"
2	Lionel Richie	10	"Hello", "Running with the Night"
2	Madonna ^{[M]}	6	"Holiday", "Like a Virgin"
2	Mark Brzezicki ^{[I]}^{[J]}^{[X]}	5	"Do They Know It's Christmas?", "Wonderland"
2	Midge Ure ^{[I]}^{[Y]}	7	"Do They Know It's Christmas?", "Dancing with Tears in My Eyes"
2	Phil Collins ^{[I]}	11	"Against All Odds (Take a Look at Me Now)", "Do They Know It's Christmas?"
2	Phil Fearon & Galaxy	4	"Everybody's Laughing", "What Do I Do"
2	The Pointer Sisters	9	"Automatic", "Jump (for My Love)"
2	Prince	8	"Purple Rain", "When Doves Cry"
2	Sarah Dallin ^{[I]}^{[Z]}	7	"Do They Know It's Christmas?", "Robert De Niro's Waiting..."
2	Siobhan Fahey ^{[G]}^{[Z]}	7	"Do They Know It's Christmas?", "Robert De Niro's Waiting..."
2	Slade ^{[I]}	3	"My Oh My", "Run Runaway"
2	Spandau Ballet	4	"I'll Fly for You", "Only When You Leave"
2	Status Quo	7	"Marguerita Time", "The Wanderer"
2	Stuart Adamson ^{[I]}^{[J]}	5	"Do They Know It's Christmas?", "Wonderland"
2	Tony Butler ^{[I]}^{[J]}^{[X]}	5	"Do They Know It's Christmas?", "Wonderland"

== Notes ==
- ^{a} "Like a Virgin" reached its peak of number three on 18 January 1985 (week ending)
- ^{b} "Relax" re-entered the top 10 at number five on 23 June 1984 (week ending) for nine weeks.
- ^{c} "Love Theme from The Thorn Birds" was the theme song to the 1983 miniseries The Thorn Birds.
- ^{d} "99 Red Balloons" was based upon the German version "99 Luftballoons" but the lyrics were not a direct translation.
- ^{e} "The Music of Torvill and Dean (EP)" re-entered the top 10 at number nine on 7 April 1984 (week ending) for one week.
- ^{f} The protest song "Nelson Mandela" was known as "Free Nelson Mandela" in some releases, while the group were also known as The Specials.
- ^{g} The Frog Chorus on "We All Stand Together" consisted of The King's Singers and the choir from St Paul's Cathedral.
- ^{h} Released as a charity single by Band Aid to aid famine relief in Ethiopia.
- ^{i} Figure includes an appearance on the "Do They Know It's Christmas?" charity single by Band Aid.
- ^{j} Artist recorded a spoken message on B-Side to "Do They Know It's Christmas?".
- ^{k} Figure includes single that peaked in 1983.
- ^{l} Figure includes single that first charted in 1983 but peaked in 1984.
- ^{m} Figure includes single that peaked in 1985.
- ^{n} Figure includes three top 10 hits with the group Wham!.
- ^{o} Figure includes three top 10 hits with the group Duran Duran.
- ^{p} Figure includes three top 10 hits with the group Culture Club.
- ^{q} Figure includes three top 10 hits with the group Queen.
- ^{r} Figure includes three top 10 hits with the group Frankie Goes to Hollywood.
- ^{s} Figure includes three top 10 hits with the group The Style Council.
- ^{t} Figure includes two top 10 hits with the group Status Quo.
- ^{u} Figure includes two top 10 hits with the group Spandau Ballet.
- ^{v} Figure includes two top 10 hits with the group Kool & The Gang.
- ^{w} Figure includes a top 10 hit with the group U2.
- ^{x} Figure includes a top 10 hit with the group Big Country.
- ^{y} Figure includes a top 10 hit with the group Ultravox
- ^{z} Figure includes a top 10 hit with the group Bananarama.
- ^{aa} Figure includes appearance on Rockwell's "Somebody's Watching Me".
- ^{bb} "Ghostbusters" re-entered the top 10 at number 7 on 29 December 1984 (week ending).

== See also ==
- 1984 in British music
- List of number-one singles from the 1980s (UK)
