= A Little Good News =

A Little Good News may refer to:

- "A Little Good News" (song)
- A Little Good News (album)
