= Jimmy Dunne (songwriter) =

American songwriter and producer

James Patrick Dunne is an American songwriter, recording artist, composer, film and television producer, and entrepreneur. His songs have been recorded on 27,000,000 records worldwide and over 1,400 television episodes and film scores. He is best known for writing the National Association of Recording Merchandisers' "Best Record of the Year" "Nobody Loves Me Like You Do," which was recorded by artists such as Whitney Houston, Jermaine Jackson, Anne Murray, and Dave Loggins.

== Early life and education ==
Jimmy Dunne was born in Oak Park, Illinois, the second of seven children. He went to high school at Lyons Township High School, a public high school in La Grange, Illinois. He played varsity tennis and wrote for the school paper.

Dunne attended the University of Kentucky where he played on the varsity Tennis Team and a member of the Sigma Alpha Epsilon fraternity. Dunne graduated with double majors in journalism and business and minors in Music and Advertising. He graduated Phi Beta Kappa, finishing in the top 1% of his graduating class. He was also a writer for the Kentucky Kernel school newspaper, and a member of Omicron Delta Kappa honor society. While in college, Dunne began his music career playing concerts throughout the Midwest while he was recording his second instrumental album, Me and My Song. He also founded Dunne productions, a music booking agency in Kentucky.

== Film and television career ==
Dunne moved to Los Angeles as the Tutor in Residence for SAE at the University of Southern California (USC) while taking graduate courses at USC's Thornton School of Music. He landed his first job with Happy Days and soon after he was hired, Dunne wrote an episode for the show and became the youngest producer at Paramount just a year later. He continued to work on Happy Days and wrote some of the most memorable episodes of the series.

After Happy Days ended, Dunne became the Producer and Writer of the spin off show, Joanie Loves Chachi and continued to produce pilots for Ron Howard and other Happy Days colleagues, such as Littleshots. Dunne also acted in a number of hit series and films including Dynasty, As the World Turns, Guiding Light, Santa Barbara, Happy Days, Pretty Woman, and Hotel just to name a few. He also holds screenwriting credits for a number of feature films with Universal Studios, Disney/Touchstone, Columbia Pictures, Kings Road Films, and HBO.

== Music career ==
Jimmy Dunne began playing and writing music at a young age. Through college he had recorded several instrumental records and began breaking into the music industry once arriving in Los Angeles. He has written, composed, and scored music for several films and television shows, such as: Happy Days, Joanie Loves Chachi, As the World Turns, ABC Wide World of Sports, NBC Sports, Official Songs of the Olympic Games, Fame, Princess Diaries II, Dear God, Heart Like a Wheel, and Pretty Woman, just to name a few. Dunne also holds songwriting credits in the Pop, Country, and R&B markets with some of the most notable artists in the industry including Whitney Houston, Janet Jackson, Jermaine Jackson, Anne Murray, Dave Loggins, and Kenny Rogers.

His best known works stretch across the music industry. He wrote the theme song for Joanie Loves Chachi, "You Look at Me." Dunne also wrote "Nobody Loves Me Like You Do," which was made popular by Whitney Houston and Jermaine Jackson in the pop genre and Anne Murray and Dave Loggins in the country market. It was also used as a major story arc in As the World Turns for Betsy (Meg Ryan) and Steve's (Frank Runyeon) wedding. "Nobody Loves Me Like You Do" also won the National Association of Recording Merchandisers' "Best Record of the Year" Award. Take 6 recorded his "Chance of a Lifetime" which was included on their album, "Brothers."

As a recording artist, Dunne has recorded CD releases for Sugo Records such as "Summer Stories," "Cinema," "Rhythm," and "Passion, Heart, and Soul." His latest album, "Sanctuary," was also released on Sugo Records.

== Inspire ==
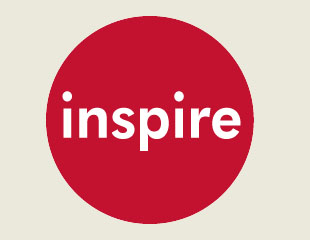

Dunne is also the president and founder of Inspire and was formerly the president of Communication Center, a branding and creative services firm in Los Angeles. Before creating Inspire, Dunne worked with graphic designers, business writers, multi-media artists, photographers, and website designers all across the country.

Inspire has partnered with JCPenney, Coffee Bean & Tea Leaf, American Greetings, Visa, UPS, and Buca di Beppo Restaurants. Current partnerships include music distribution to Whole Foods Market and conference-calling company InterCall.
