= Country Hits =

Country Hits may refer to:

- Country Hits (Anne Murray album), 1987
- Country Hits Old and New, a 1966 album by Ernest Tubb
