= 1984 Country Music Association Awards =

Annual US music awards ceremony

- Date: October 8, 1984
- Location: Grand Ole Opry House, Nashville, Tennessee
- Hosted by: Kenny Rogers
- Most wins: Anne Murray (2)
- Most nominations: Alabama (4); Lee Greenwood (4)

Television/radio coverage
- Network: CBS

The 1984 Country Music Association Awards, 18th Ceremony, was held on October 8, 1984, at the Grand Ole Opry House, Nashville, Tennessee, and was hosted by CMA Award winner Kenny Rogers.

== Winners and nominees ==
Entertainer of the Year	Album of the Year
Alabama; Lee Greenwood; Barbara Mandrell; Ronnie Milsap; Oak Ridge Boys	A Little Good News — Anne Murray; Don't Cheat in Our Hometown — Ricky Skaggs; Right or Wrong — George Strait; Roll On — Alabama; That's the Way Love Goes — Merle Haggard
Male Vocalist of the Year	Female Vocalist of the Year
Lee Greenwood; Merle Haggard; Gary Morris; Ricky Skaggs; George Strait	Reba McEntire; Janie Fricke; Emmylou Harris; Barbara Mandrell; Anne Murray
Vocal Group of the Year	Vocal Duo of the Year
Statler Brothers; Alabama; Exile; The Judds; Oak Ridge Boys	Willie Nelson and Julio Iglesias; Barbara Mandrell and Lee Greenwood; Dolly Parton and Kenny Rogers; Don Williams and Emmylou Harris; Moe Bandy and Joe Stampley
Single of the Year	Song of the Year
"A Little Good News" — Anne Murray; "Holding Her And Loving You" — Earl Thomas Conley; "Islands In The Stream" — Dolly Parton and Kenny Rogers; "Mama He's Crazy" — The Judds; "To All The Girls I've Loved Before" — Willie Nelson	"Wind Beneath My Wings" — Jeff Silbar and Larry Henley; "A Little Good News" — Charlie Black, Tommy Rocco, Rory Bourke; "Islands In The Stream" — Barry Gibb, Robin Gibb, and Maurice Gibb; "God Bless The USA" — Lee Greenwood; "To All The Girls I've Loved Before" — Hal David and Albert Hammond
Horizon Award	Instrumentalist of the Year
The Judds; Deborah Allen; Earl Thomas Conley; Vern Gosdin; Michael Martin Murphey	Chet Atkins; Roy Clark; Floyd Cramer; Charlie McCoy; Hargus "Pig" Robbins
Instrumental Group of the Year
Ricky Skaggs Band; Alabama; Exile; Nitty Gritty Dirt Band; Oak Ridge Boys Band

== Hall of Fame ==
Country Music Hall of Fame Inductees
- Ralph Peer
- Floyd Tillman
