= Over You (Anne Murray song) =

Single by Anne Murray

from the album The Best…So Far
- Released: 1994
- Genre: Country pop
- Length: 3:11
- Label: EMI Music Canada
- Songwriters: Byron Hill; Tony Hiller
- Producer: David Foster

Anne Murray singles chronology
| "Born to Be with You" (1994) | "Over You" (1994) | "What Would It Take" (1996) |

"Over You" is a song written by Byron Hill and Tony Hiller and performed by Anne Murray. The song reached number 11 on the Canadian Adult Contemporary chart and number 29 on the Canadian Country chart in 1995. The song appeared on her 1994 album, The Best…So Far. The song is about a woman who isn't over her former lover yet, and still holding on to the slight chance of him changing his mind and returning to her.

== Chart performance ==
| Chart (1994–1995) | Peak position |
|---|---|
| Canada Top Singles (RPM) | 85 |
| Canada Adult Contemporary (RPM) | 11 |
| Canada Country Singles (RPM) | 29 |

=== Year-end charts ===
| Chart (1995) | Position |
|---|---|
| Canada Adult Contemporary Tracks (RPM) | 94 |
