= Something to Talk About (album) =

Studio album by Anne Murray
- Released: 1986
- Studios: Eastern Sound (Toronto, Ontario, Canada); Lion Share Studios, Image Recording Studios, Oasis Studios and Westlake Studios (Los Angeles, California, USA); Can-Am Recorders (Tarzana, California, USA); Larrabee Sound Studios (West Hollywood, California, USA); Unique Recording Studios (New York City, New York); D.I. Musikstudio and Paradise Studios (Munich, Germany)
- Genres: Country, Pop
- Length: 38:21
- Label: Capitol
- Producers: David Foster (track 1); Jack White (tracks 2–6, 10); Keith Diamond (tracks 7–9)

Anne Murray chronology
Heart Over Mind (1984)	Something to Talk About (1986)	Harmony (1987)

Singles from Something to Talk About
- 1. "Now and Forever (You and Me)" Released: January 1986; 2. "Who's Leaving Who" Released: April 1986; 3. "My Life's a Dance" Released: June 1986

Something to Talk About is the twenty-second studio album by Canadian country pop artist Anne Murray. It was released by Capitol Records in 1986. The album is so named after the Shirley Eikhard-composed song "Something to Talk About", which Murray had wanted to record for the album but was rejected by her producers; Bonnie Raitt went on to have a huge hit with the song.

The album peaked at #2 for several weeks on the Billboard Top Country Albums chart - Anne's highest position. The disc was certified Gold by the RIAA.

== Track listing ==
No.	Title	Writer(s)	Length
1.	"Now and Forever (You and Me)"	David Foster, Jim Vallance, Randy Goodrum	4:14
2.	"Who's Leaving Who"	Jack White, Mark Spiro	3:40
3.	"My Life's a Dance"	White, Spiro	4:23
4.	"Call Us Fools"	Alan Roy Scott, Roy Freeland, Jill Colucci	3:51
5.	"On and On"	Jerry Buckner	4:02
6.	"Heartaches"	C. F. Turner	3:53
7.	"Reach for Me"	Roger Bruno, Ellen Schwartz	3:54
8.	"When You're Gone"	Keith Diamond, Cliff Dawson	4:05
9.	"You Never Know"	Gary Nicholson, Amy Sky	3:09
10.	"Gotcha"	White, Spiro, Ed Arkin	3:22

== Personnel ==
- Anne Murray – lead vocals
- David Foster – keyboards (1), synthesizers (1), arrangements (1)
- Ed Arkin – keyboards (2–6, 10), synthesizers (2–6, 10), programming (2–6, 10), bass (2–6, 10), electronic drums (2–6, 10), arrangements (5, 6)
- Michael Boddicker – keyboards (2–6, 10), synthesizers (2–6, 10), programming (2–6, 10), bass (2–6, 10), electronic drums (2–6, 10)
- Harold Faltermeyer – keyboards (2–6, 10), synthesizers (2–6, 10), programming (2–6, 10), bass (2–6, 10), electronic drums (2–6, 10), arrangements (10)
- Mark Spiro – keyboards (2–6, 10), synthesizers (2–6, 10), programming (2–6, 10), bass (2–6, 10), electronic drums (2–6, 10), backing vocals (2–6, 10), arrangements (2–6, 10)
- Bo Tomlyn – keyboards (2–6, 10), synthesizers (2–6, 10), programming (2–6, 10), bass (2–6, 10), electronic drums (2–6, 10)
- Uve Schikora – keyboards (2–6, 10), synthesizers (2–6, 10), programming (2–6, 10), bass (2–6, 10), electronic drums (2–6, 10), arrangements (2–4)
- Kristian Schultze – keyboards (2–6, 10), synthesizers (2–6, 10), programming (2–6, 10), bass (2–6, 10), electronic drums (2–6, 10)
- Tom Hensley – acoustic piano (4)
- Skip Anderson – keyboards (7–9), acoustic piano (7–9)
- Oscar Brown – keyboards (7–9)
- Keith Diamond – synthesizers (7–9), programming (7–9), bass (7–9), electronic drums (7–9), arrangements (7–9)
- Michael Landau – guitars (1–6, 10)
- Bob Mann – guitars (1)
- Russ Freeman – guitars (2–6, 10)
- Dann Huff – guitars (2–6, 10)
- Ronny Drayton – guitars (7–9)
- Paul Pesco – guitars (7–9)
- Bob Rosa – drums (7–9)
- Terry Silverlight – drums (7–9)
- Brian Malouf – percussion (2–6, 10)
- Gary Herbig – saxophone solos (2–6, 10)
- Larry Williams – saxophones (2–6, 10), sax solos (2–6, 10)
- Lew McCreary – trombone (2–6, 10)
- Chuck Findley – trumpet (2–6, 10)
- Jerry Hey – trumpet (2–6, 10)
- Richard Page – backing vocals (1–6, 10)
- Jill Colucci – backing vocals (2–6, 10)
- Cindy Fee – backing vocals (2–6, 10)
- Steve George – backing vocals (2–6, 10)
- Jim Haas – backing vocals (2–6, 10)
- Jon Joyce – backing vocals (2–6, 10)
- Tom Kelly – backing vocals (2–6, 10)
- Edie Lehmann – backing vocals (2–6, 10)
- Joe Pizzulo – backing vocals (2–6, 10)
- Andrea Robinson – backing vocals (2–6, 10)
- Cliff Dawson – backing vocals (7–9)
- Jill Dell'Abate – backing vocals (7–9)
- Curtis King – backing vocals (7–9)
- Yvonne Lewis – backing vocals (7–9)
- Cindy Mizelll – backing vocals (7–9)
- Sandy Pandya – backing vocals (7–9)

== Production ==
- Balmur Ltd. – executive producers
- David Foster – producer (1)
- Jack White – producer (2–6, 10)
- Mark Spiro – associate producer (2–6, 10)
- Keith Diamond – producer (7–9)
- Paul Cade – art direction, design
- Nigel Dixon – photography
- Sheila Yakimov – hair stylist
- George Abbott – make-up
- Lee Kinoshita-Bevington – wardrobe designer
- Leonard T. Rambeau – personal management

Technical

- Brian Gardner – mastering at Bernie Grundman Mastering (Hollywood, California) (2–6, 10)
- Wally Traugott – mastering at Capitol Records (Hollywood, California) (7–9)
- Ken Friesen – engineer (1–6, 10)
- Humberto Gatica – mixing (1)
- Jürgen Koppers – engineer (2–6, 10), mixing (2, 4–6, 10)
- Brian Malouf – engineer (2–6, 10), remixing (3)
- Kristian Schultze – engineer (2–6, 10)
- Jon Van Nest – engineer (2–6, 10)
- Bob Rosa – engineer (7–9), mixing (8, 9)
- Tom Lord-Alge – mixing (7)
- Tom Henderson – assistant engineer (1–6, 10)
- Stephen Krause – assistant engineer (2–6, 10)
- Peggy McAffee – assistant engineer (2–6, 10)
- Samii Taylor – assistant engineer (2–6, 10)
- Sabrina Buchanek – mix assistant (2–6, 10)
- Acar Key – assistant engineer (7–9)

== Charts ==
=== Weekly charts ===
Chart (1986)	Peak position
Canadian Albums (RPM)	22
US Billboard 200	68
US Top Country Albums (Billboard)	2

=== Year-end charts ===
Chart (1986)	Position
US Top Country Albums (Billboard)	37
