= Heart First =

Studio album by Hazell Dean
- Released: 16 November 1984
- Genre: Pop, hi-NRG
- Length: 36:37
- Label: Proto
- Producer: Stock Aitken Waterman, Ian Anthony Stephens

Hazell Dean chronology
The Sound of Bacharach and David (1981)	Heart First (1984)	Always (1988)

Singles from Heart First
- 1. "Searchin' (I Gotta Find a Man)" Released: 20 April 1984 (re-issue); 2. "Whatever I Do (Wherever I Go)" Released: 16 July 1984; 3. "Back in My Arms (Once Again)" Released: 22 October 1984; 4. "No Fool (For Love)" Released: February 1985

Professional ratings
Review scores
Source	Rating
Record Mirror	2/5 stars
Smash Hits	4/10

Heart First is a 1984 album by British singer Hazell Dean. It was her first album as a mainstream pop artist following the top ten successes of "Searchin' (I Gotta Find a Man)" and "Whatever I Do (Wherever I Go)". It was the first album to be produced by the highly successful Stock Aitken Waterman production team.

== Background ==
Released in late 1984, the album featured the top 10 hits "Searchin' (I Gotta Find a Man)" and "Whatever I Do (Wherever I Go)" as well as the singles "Back in My Arms (Once Again)" and "No Fool (For Love)", which both reached No.41. "Harmony" and "Devil In You" were also released as singles in Germany.

Heart First was released on the Proto record label and produced by Stock Aitken Waterman - the first album the trio were responsible for. The first single they produced for Dean was "Whatever I Do (Wherever I Go)", which was originally titled "Dance Your Love Away" and reworked by Waterman when Dean was unhappy with the chorus. The engineer of the song had accidentally mixed the drum beats backwards, which produced an unusual juddering sound across the recording, but Waterman was so impressed with the result that it stayed on the song. The single went on to sell 300,000 copies in the UK and was the producers' first top-10 hit together.

Despite the hit, Stock Aitken Waterman were in dire financial straits, as was the record company, Proto. Waterman was keen to complete the album and considered it to be the very first full Hi-NRG album - a genre normally limited to singles and 12" remixes. The album was completed on a shoestring budget, but everyone involved was happy with the finished product. Of the album Dean said at the time that she was very excited about the album and the fact that it contained three of her own compositions; "the album consists of about five hi-NRG tracks but I've also tried to head in different directions too - funky tracks, ballads and so on." She also considered album track "Harmony" to be a good song to be released around Christmas. However, problems were apparent at the record company and despite the hit singles, the album failed to chart. Dean blamed the album's failure on poor promotion and bad timing. Dean parted company with Proto Records after the fourth single was released, but did go on to work with Stock Aitken Waterman again in future years.

Reviews for the album were mostly critical. Record Mirror said that the songs sounded the same. It complimented the production, but said that the slow numbers were "sung competently but passionlessly". It also criticised the album cover, calling it "horrendous". Smash Hits said the three singles were by far the best songs on the album, while the others "suffer from a distinct lack of tune". They labelled it "a rush job". Number One magazine said of "Back in My Arms (Once Again)" that it was a good song, but not as strong in the hi-NRG sound as her two previous singles, saying "it's more ABBA than Evelyn Thomas [but] if you liked the others, you'll love this."

The album was released on compact disc in 1984 in Germany and elsewhere in 1997. It was later re-released on 15 March 2010 as a remastered special edition featuring bonus tracks through the UK label Cherry Red Records. This version included the song "Stay In My Life" (Dean's entry for the A Song for Europe competition in 1984), as well as B-sides and extended mixes not previously available on CD.

== Track listing ==
Side one
No.	Title	Writer(s)	Length
1.	"Back in My Arms (Once Again)"	Stock, Aitken	3:10
2.	"Searchin' (I Gotta Find a Man)"	I. A. Stephens	3:38
3.	"Break the Rules"	Shelley, Woloshuk, Roth	3:23
4.	"Whatever I Do (Wherever I Go)"	Stock, Aitken	3:42
5.	"You're Too Good to Be True"	H. Dean	4:20
6.	"Back in My Arms (Once Again) (Reprise)"	Stock, Aitken	0:55

Side two
No.	Title	Writer(s)	Length
7.	"Heart First"	Pickus, Thomas	3:22
8.	"No Fool (For Love)"	Stock, Aitken	3:35
9.	"Harmony"	Clift, Marsh	3:51
10.	"Devil in You"	H. Dean	3:10
11.	"Everything I Need"	Dean, Bradley	3:31

The cassette version of the album also featured the song "Evergreen".

2010 CD issue bonus tracks
No.	Title	Writer(s)	Length
12.	"Stay in My Life"	Dean, Bradley	3:03
13.	"Searchin' (I Gotta Find a Man) (12" version)"	I. A. Stephens	8:18
14.	"Whatever I Do (Wherever I Go) (12" mix)"	Stock, Aitken	8:15
15.	"Young Boy in the City"	Dean	3:32
16.	"Back in My Arms (Once Again) (12" mix)"	Stock, Aitken	6:41
17.	"Take Me Home"	Dean	3:22
18.	"No Fool (For Love) (12" version)" (Disc actually plays the Murray Mix, not the original 12")	Stock, Aitken	6:12

All songs produced by Stock Aitken Waterman, except "Searchin' (I Gotta Find a Man)" by Ian Anthony Stephens.
