= Who's Leaving Who =

1986 single by Anne Murray

"Who's Leaving Who" is a song written by Jack White and Mark Spiro, first recorded by Canadian country singer Anne Murray in 1986. It achieved bigger popularity in Europe when it was covered by British Hi-NRG singer Hazell Dean in 1988. David Hasselhoff covered the song on his 1991 album David, produced by Jack White.

== Anne Murray version ==
"Who's Leaving Who"

Single by Anne Murray

from the album Something to Talk About
- B-side: "Reach for Me"
- Released: 1986
- Genre: Pop
- Length: 3:38
- Label: Capitol
- Songwriter: Mark Spiro - Jack White
- Producer: Jack White

Anne Murray singles chronology
"Now and Forever (You and Me)" (1986)	"Who's Leaving Who" (1986)	"My Life's a Dance" (1986)

The song was first recorded by Anne Murray for her Gold-plus 1986 album Something to Talk About. The song was released as the album's second single, following her Canadian and US number one country single, "Now and Forever (You and Me)". The single failed to reach the same level of success, peaking at number 93 on the Canadian singles chart, and failing to chart on the US Billboard Hot 100. Its biggest success was on the adult contemporary charts, peaking at number 15 in Canada and number 26 in the US.

=== Charts ===
Chart (1986)	Peak position
Canada Top Singles (RPM)	93
Canada Adult Contemporary (RPM)	15
US Adult Contemporary (Billboard)	26
US Hot Country Songs (Billboard)	62

== Hazell Dean version ==
"Who's Leaving Who"

Single by Hazell Dean

from the album Always
- Released: March 21, 1988
- Genre: Pop; Hi-NRG
- Length: 3:38
- Label: EMI
- Songwriters: Mark Spiro; Jack White
- Producer: Stock Aitken Waterman

Hazell Dean singles chronology
"Always Doesn't Mean Forever" (1987)	"Who's Leaving Who" (1988)	"Maybe (We Should Call It a Day)" (1988)

English singer Hazell Dean recorded a cover version of the song for her 1988 album Always. The song was produced by Stock Aitken & Waterman and was reworked to suit Hazell Dean's music style as a Hi-NRG song. Released on March 21, 1988 by EMI Records, the single surpassed the popularity of Murray's version and became Dean's biggest international success, peaking at number four in the UK and becoming her highest-charting single there, tied with her 1984 single "Whatever I Do (Wherever I Go)". It was her first top-40 hit in the UK in four years. When released around Europe, it also became a success, and it appeared on the US dance chart.

=== Release ===
At the time of the single's release, Stock Aitken Waterman were criticised by some for their songs sounding "samey". Hazell Dean defended the producers in Melody Maker, saying, "Maybe, but any studio sound always will. I'm honestly shocked the way some people react to them, the flak they take. They're just down-to-earth blokes and bloody good musicians making good records which I personally think will last. And Pete Waterman bases the whole thing on Tamia Motown you know, all that family thing. Everyone makes their own tea and so on. I can't believe how they get knocked!"

=== Critical reception ===
==== Initial response ====
Tony Reed from Melody Maker wrote, "This time, the Hi-NRG signatures are buried deep in the mix (by Pete Hammond, but "produced" by SAW — Inna Spielberg stylee?) and overlaid with so much candy-floss tinkly bits that one can only assume that the success of Rick Minogue has gone to SAW's wily old heads." Johnny Dee from Record Mirror said, "Yes this record goes 'boom, chug-a-chug, chug, boom, chug-a-chug, chug." The magazine's James Hamilton wrote in his dance column, "Stock Aitken Waterman-produced thuddingly bounding 120bpm galloper with an attractive Eurobeat-ish lilt". A review in Pan-European magazine Music & Media stated about the song: "The beat is what used to be called Eurodisco; a stomping, electro dance groove with a very Abba-like song."

==== Impact and legacy ====
Retrospectively, in 2021, British magazine Classic Pop ranked the song number 14 in their list of 'Top 40 Stock Aitken Waterman songs', adding: "When PWL added their Hi-NRG motifs to Canadian country artist Anne Murray's version of "Who's Leaving Who" from two years earlier, the song took on ABBA-esque qualities that worked like a charm... When this put her into the Top 40, eventually climbing into the Top 5, things were looking up." In 2023, Alexis Petridis of The Guardian listed the song at number 12 in his "Stock Aitken Waterman's 20 greatest songs – ranked!", adding that it "is the best of the lot, boasting a melody that's not just Abba-influenced, but Abba standard: the bridge and chorus are fantastic." In 2025, Thomas Edward of Smooth Radio ranked the song ninth in his list of "Stock Aitken Waterman's 15 greatest songs, ranked".

=== Chart performance ===
In the UK, "Who's Leaving Who" debuted at number 37 on April 2, 1988, reached the top ten two weeks later, peaked at number four for two consecutive weeks, thus attaining the same position than "Whatever I Do (Whenever I Go)" four years earlier, and remained on the chart for a total of 11 weeks, five of them spent in the top ten. It ranked at number 59 on the 1988's national year-end chart, and peaked at number six for consecutive two weeks on the UK Dance Chart established by Music Week. In the other European countries, the song achieved his highest position in Ireland where it attained number two and charted for five weeks, and was also a top ten hit in Finland and Luxembourg. It failed to enter the top ten by one place in Switzerland, reached number 15 in West Germany out of a 12-week chart run, peaked at number 17 in both the Flanders region of Belgium and Austria, and stalled out of the top 30 in the Netherlands. On the Pan-Eurochart Hot 100 singles compiled by the Music & Media magazine, "Who's Leaving Who" debuted at number 71 on April 16, 1988, culminated at number 12 for consecutive two weeks, and fell off the chart after 19 weeks of presence. It also featured for six weeks on the European Airplay Top 50 with a peak at number 25 in its fourth week. Outside Europe, "Who's Leaving Who" was a number-one hit in Israel and a top-20 hit on the US Dance Club Songs chart, peaking on July 9, 1988, at number 19, with eight weeks of charting. In New Zealand, it debuted at a peak of number 44 in May 1988 and charted in the top 50 for four weeks.

=== Charts ===
==== Weekly charts ====
1988 weekly chart performance for "Who's Leaving Who"
Chart (1988)	Peak position
Austria (Ö3 Austria Top 40)	17
Belgium (Ultratop 50 Flanders)	17
Europe (European Hot 100 Singles)	12
Europe (European Airplay Top 50)	25
Finland (Suomen virallinen lista)	10
Ireland (IRMA)	2
Israel (Israeli Singles Chart)	1
Luxembourg (Radio Luxembourg)	3
Netherlands (Dutch Top 40)	31
Netherlands (Single Top 100)	34
New Zealand (Recorded Music NZ)	44
South Africa (Springbok Radio)	16
Switzerland (Schweizer Hitparade)	11
UK Singles (Official Charts)	4
UK Dance (Music Week)	6
US Dance Club Songs (Billboard)	19
US Dance Singles Sales (Billboard)	48
West Germany (GfK)	15

==== Year-end charts ====
1988 year-end chart performance for "Who's Leaving Who"
Chart (1988)	Position
Europe (Eurochart Hot 100 Singles)	93
UK Singles (OCC)	59
