= They Say It's Gonna Rain =

Single by Kerry Delius
- Released: 1984
- Genre: Pop; dance
- Length: 4:10
- Label: Arrival
- Songwriter(s): George Sanders; Kerry Delius
- Producer(s): Keith Marshall

"They Say It's Gonna Rain" is a song co-written (with George Sanders) and sung by British female artist Kerry Delius. She released the song as a single in 1984 and while it failed to chart, it became an underground club hit. The song achieved a bigger popularity when it was covered by Hazell Dean the following year. A Zulu chant is featured in the intro which is repeated throughout the song.

== Hazell Dean version ==
"They Say It's Gonna Rain"

Single by Hazell Dean

from the album Always
- Released: 30 September 1985
- Genre: Pop; dance
- Length: 3:51
- Label: EMI
- Songwriter(s): George Sanders; Kerry Delius
- Producer(s): Stock Aitken & Waterman

Hazell Dean singles chronology
"No Fool (For Love)" (1985)	"They Say It's Gonna Rain" (1985)	"E.S.P." (1986)

British Hi-NRG singer Hazell Dean covered the song and released it as a single in September 1985. Having scored two top 10 singles in 1984 with an independent dance label, Dean was offered to sign major label EMI Records in 1985, and this single marked her first release with them.

Dean's version was produced by Stock Aitken & Waterman, with whom Dean had recorded most of her debut album. She changed some parts of the lyrics, most notably, she substituted the line on the chorus "though you can break my heart" with "they say it's gonna rain"; the title of the song not being present on the chorus on Delius' version but was instead ad-libbed over the chorus at the end of the song. The song was also reworked at a faster tempo than the original.

Two main mixes were commissioned for the song, the Zulu Mix and the Indian Summer Mix. Dean favored the former, which is the one she used for her live performances. The Zulu Mix of "They Say It's Gonna Rain" was included on Dean's second album, Always, which was released three years after the single, in 1988. In 2012, both mixes, as well as the 7" version and the single's B-side "Can't Get You Out Of My Mind", were included on a reissue of the album.

Dean released an updated version with re-recorded vocals and new mixes as a digital single on 14 February 2011.

=== Music video ===
The song was Dean's debut video clip for a single. Shot on location in Malta, the video depicts Dean reminiscing a love affair in the island while on the way for a TV performance.

=== Release and reception ===
Released in October 1985 in the United Kingdom, the single only managed to chart at number 58 on the UK Singles Chart. Internationally, the song fared better, becoming a number-one hit on the South African Springbok Radio chart (eventually attaining the number 11 spot on that country's 1986 year-end chart) and peaking at number 6 in both Norway and Sweden.

=== Charts ===
==== Weekly charts ====
Chart (1985–1986)	Peak position
Norway (VG-lista)	6
South Africa (Springbok Radio)	1
Sweden (Sverigetopplistan)	6
UK Singles (OCC)	58

==== Year-end charts ====
Chart (1986)	Position
South Africa (Springbok Radio)	11
