= That's Not the Way (It's S'posed to Be) =

Single by Anne Murray

from the album A Little Good News
- B-side: "The More We Try"
- Released: 1984
- Genre: Pop
- Length: 3:13
- Label: Capitol Records 2000807
- Songwriter(s): Andy Goldmark, Phil Galdston
- Producer(s): Jim Ed Norman

Anne Murray singles chronology
"A Little Good News" (1983)	"That's Not the Way (It's S'posed to Be)" (1984)	"Just Another Woman in Love" (1984)

"That's Not the Way (It's S'posed to Be)" is a song written by Andy Goldmark and Phil Galdston and performed by Anne Murray. The song reached #5 on the Canadian Adult Contemporary chart and #12 on the U.S. Adult Contemporary chart in 1984. The song appeared on her 1983 album, A Little Good News. The song was produced by Jim Ed Norman.

== Chart performance ==
Chart (1984)	Peak position
Canadian RPM Country Tracks	22
Canadian RPM Adult Contemporary	5
U.S. Country	46
Billboard Hot 100	106
U.S. Adult Contemporary	12
