= Always (Hazell Dean album) =

Studio album by Hazell Dean
- Released: 10 October 1988
- Recorded: 1985–1988
- Genre: Pop; hi-NRG
- Length: 47:30
- Label: EMI
- Producer: Stock Aitken Waterman and others

Hazell Dean chronology
Heart First (1984)	Always (1988)	The Best of Hazell Dean (1995)

Professional ratings
Review scores
Source	Rating
Number One	1/5 stars

Always is the 3rd album by British singer Hazell Dean, released in October 1988 by EMI Records.

The album coincided with Dean's comeback and features the hit singles "Who's Leaving Who" (UK No. 4), "Maybe (We Should Call it a Day)" (UK No. 15) and "Turn It into Love" (UK No. 21). Also included are remixes of Dean's earlier singles; "They Say It's Gonna Rain" (UK No. 58, 1985), "No Fool (For Love)" (UK No. 41, 1985; original version included on her previous album Heart First), and "Always Doesn't Mean Forever" (UK No. 92). The album itself reached No. 38, Dean's highest placing in the album chart. It was also released in the US in 1988 with an alternative cover.

On 23 April 2012, a remastered deluxe double edition of the album with bonus tracks was released on the Cherry Pop UK label, including previously released singles that had not been included on any album; "ESP (Extra Sensual Persuasion)" (UK No. 98, 1986) and "Stand Up" (UK No. 79, 1986) – and several remixes.

== Track listing ==
Side one

1. "They Say It's Gonna Rain" (The Zulu Mix) (7:08) Producer – Stock Aitken Waterman
2. "Who's Leaving Who" (Bob's Tambourine Mix) (4:45) Producer – Stock Aitken Waterman
3. "Turn It into Love" (3:37) Producer – Stock Aitken Waterman
4. "You're My Rainbow" (5:13) Producer – Ian Levine and Fiachra Trench

Side two

1. "Always Doesn't Mean Forever" (7:05) Producer – Stock Aitken Waterman
2. "Maybe (We Should Call It a Day)" (6:39) Producer – Stock Aitken Waterman
3. "Walk in My Shoes" (4:19) Producer – Trevor Vallis and Ian Curnow
4. "Nothing in My Life" (3:46) Producer – Pete Hammond
5. "Danger" (4:58) Producer – Pete Hammond

The cassette version of the album includes the song "No Fool (For Love)" (6:09), while the compact disc version also features the song "Ain't Nothing Like the Real Thing" (6:23) (a duet with Darryl Pandy).

=== Deluxe Edition ===
Released in 2012, it features the album plus a selection of non-album singles and B-sides on CD 1. CD 2 consists of remixes from various singles off the album.

CD one

1. "They Say It's Gonna Rain" (7" Version) (3:59) Producer – Stock Aitken Waterman
2. "Who's Leaving Who" (7" Version) (3:45) Producer – Stock Aitken Waterman
3. "Turn It into Love" (3:37) Producer – Stock Aitken Waterman
4. "You're My Rainbow" (5:13) Producer – Ian Levine and Fiachra Trench
5. "Always Doesn't Mean Forever" (7" Version) (3:37) Producer – Stock Aitken Waterman
6. "Maybe (We Should Call It a Day)" (7" Version) (3:40) Producer – Stock Aitken Waterman
7. "Walk in My Shoes" (4:19) Producer – Trevor Vallis and Ian Curnow
8. "Nothing in My Life" (3:46) Producer – Pete Hammond
9. "Danger" (4:58) Producer – Hazell Dean and Pete Ware
10. "No Fool (For Love)" (The Murray 7" Version) (3:24) Producer – Stock Aitken Waterman, remix by Phil Harding
11. "Ain't Nothing Like the Real Thing" (6:23) (duet with Darryl Pandy) Producer – Ian Levine and Ian Curnow
12. "Stand Up" (7" Version) (3:46) Producer – Stock Aitken Waterman
13. "Can't Get You Out of My Mind" (3:56) Producer – Stock Aitken Waterman
14. "Love Ends Love Parts" (3:25) Producer – Stock Aitken Waterman
15. "Walk in My Shoes" (7" Version) (3:54) Producer – Trevor Vallis
16. "E.S.P." (7" Version) (3:30) Producer – Ian Anthony Stephens
17. "Who's Leaving Who" (The Boys Are Back In Town Mix) (6:58)
18. "Stand Up" (Extended Version) (6:59)

CD two

1. "E.S.P." (Extended Version) (10:34)
2. "Image in the Mirror" (3:49) Producer – Ian Anthony Stephens
3. "They Say It's Gonna Rain" (Indian Summer Mix) (6:20)
4. "Always Doesn't Mean Forever" (My-Ami Mix) (7:07)
5. "Maybe (We Should Call It a Day)" (Extended Version) (6:42)
6. "Walk in My Shoes" (Nightmare Mix) (8:24)
7. "Who's Leaving Who" (Bob's Tambourine Mix) (4:45)
8. "Maybe (We Should Call It a Day)" (Extra Beat Boys Mix) (6:41)
9. "Turn It into Love" (House Mix) (7:19)
10. "They Say It's Gonna Rain" (Zulu Mix) (7:08)
11. "Turn It into Love" (Alternative 12" Mix) (5:57)
