= Searchin' (I Gotta Find a Man) =

1983 single by Hazell Dean

- UK & French picture sleeve

Single by Hazell Dean

from the album Heart First
- Released: 20 June 1983; 20 April 1984 (reissue)
- Recorded: February 1983
- Studio: Scorpio Sound
- Genre: Hi-NRG
- Length: 3:38
- Label: Proto
- Songwriter: Ian Anthony Stephens
- Producer: Ian Anthony Stephens

Hazell Dean singles chronology
"Stay in My Life" (1983)	"Searchin' (I Gotta Find a Man)" (1983)	"Jealous Love" / "Evergreen" (1984)

Hazell Dean singles chronology
"Jealous Love" / "Evergreen" (1984)	"Searchin' (I Gotta Find a Man)" (1984)	"Whatever I Do (Wherever I Go)" (1984)

"Searchin' (I Gotta Find a Man)" is a song written and produced by Ian Anthony Stephens and recorded by British singer Hazell Dean in 1983. It became a top-ten hit on the UK Singles Chart and US Dance Club Songs chart. It was covered in 2007 by Australian girl group Young Divas.

The single was initially released in 1983 and peaked at number seventy-six in the UK Singles Chart. The song became a popular dance track, particularly so in gay clubs. After hitting the U.S. Dance charts, where it peaked at number eight, it was re-issued in the UK in 1984 and managed to reach number six in the UK Singles Chart, becoming one of her most successful singles to date. The song was later included on her album Heart First.

== Charts ==
Chart (1983) ^{1}	Peak position
UK Singles (OCC)	76
U.S. Billboard Club Play Singles	8

Chart (1984) ^{2}	Peak position
Australia (Kent Music Report)	17
Ireland (IRMA)	7
South Africa (Springbok Radio)	14
UK Singles (OCC)	6

=== Year-end charts ===
Chart (1984)	Position
UK Singles (Gallup)	70

== Searchin' '97 ==
"Searchin' '97"

Single by Hazell Dean
- Released: 20 August 1997
- Genre: Dance
- Length: 4:24
- Label: Infinity
- Songwriter: Ian Anthony Stephens
- Producers: Hazell Dean, Pete Ware

Hazell Dean singles chronology
"The Winner Takes It All" (1996)	"Searchin' '97" (1997)	"Sisters Are Doin' It for Themselves" (1998)

In 1997 Hazell Dean released a remixed version of Searchin'. This remix, by Pete Ware, only charted in the UK. It was also their only release that year.

=== Track listings ===
CD-Maxi

1. Searchin' '97 (Radio Edit) – 4:24
2. Searchin' '97 (12" Clubmix) – 5:45
3. Searchin' '97 (Powermix) – 5:06
4. Searchin' '97 (Gotta Find A Man Mix) – 5:20
5. Searchin' '97 (Who's Housin' Who Mix) – 4:05

=== Charts ===
Chart (1997)	Peak position
UK Singles Chart	92

== Young Divas version ==
"Searchin'"

Single by Young Divas

from the album Young Divas
- Released: 17 March 2007
- Recorded: 2006
- Length: 3:33
- Label: Sony BMG
- Songwriter: Ian Anthony Stephens
- Producer: George Pappetros

Young Divas singles chronology
"Happenin' All Over Again" (2006)	"Searchin'" (2007)	"Turn Me Loose" (2007)

Audio video
- "Searchin'" on YouTube

"Searchin'" was covered by Australian girl group Young Divas for their self-titled debut album Young Divas. It was produced by George Pappetros and released as the third and final single from the album on 17 March 2007. The song peaked at number 40 on the ARIA Singles Chart. A music video for "Searchin'" features the Young Divas dancing in a nightclub with men.

=== Track listing ===
CD single

1. "Searchin'" – 3:33
2. "Searchin'" (Pop Embassy Remix) – 6:24
3. "Searchin'" (KC Baker Club Mix) – 6:05
4. "Searchin'" (Radio Extended) – 5:03

=== Chart ===
Chart (2007)	Peak position
Australia (ARIA)	40
