= Now and Forever (You and Me) =

Single by Anne Murray

from the album Something to Talk About
- B-side: "I Don't Wanna Spend Another Night Without You"
- Released: January 1986
- Genre: Country, pop
- Length: 4:14
- Label: Capitol
- Songwriters: David Foster; Randy Goodrum; Jim Vallance
- Producer: David Foster

Anne Murray singles chronology
"I Don't Think I'm Ready for You" (1985)	"Now and Forever (You and Me)" (1986)	"Who's Leaving Who" (1986)

"Now and Forever (You and Me)" is a 1986 song written by David Foster, Randy Goodrum and Jim Vallance and recorded by Canadian country music artist Anne Murray. It was aided by a popular music video, filmed in Toronto. The back-up vocal was sung by Richard Page, lead singer for the pop group Mr. Mister. It was released in January 1986 as the first single from her twentieth studio album Something to Talk About.

The song was Murray's tenth and final number one hit on the U.S. Country singles chart and spent six weeks on the Billboard Hot 100, peaking at number 92 (Murray's final song to cross over to that chart). It remained for a total of nineteen weeks on the Billboard Country chart. The song was the last number one on the Billboard Hot Country Songs charts by a non-American until fellow Canadian Shania Twain's "Any Man of Mine" reached number one in 1995.

== Chart performance ==
Chart (1986)	Peak position
Canadian RPM Country Tracks	1
Canadian RPM Adult Contemporary Tracks	2
Canadian RPM Top Singles	12
US Hot Country Songs (Billboard)	1
U.S. Billboard Hot Adult Contemporary Tracks	7
U.S. Billboard Hot 100	92

== Notable appearances ==
- This song played during the closing credits of the episode of the American daytime soap opera All My Children on 24 March 1986.
- The song was used for the Sophia and C.C. characters on the American serial Santa Barbara.
