= Heart over Mind (Anne Murray album) =

Heart Over Mind

Studio album by Anne Murray
- Released: 1984
- Studios: Eastern Sound (Toronto, Ontario, Canada); Sound Stage Studios (Nashville, Tennessee, USA); Sunset Sound Recorders (Hollywood, California, USA)
- Genre: Country
- Length: 36:45
- Label: Capitol
- Producer: Jim Ed Norman

Anne Murray chronology
A Little Good News (1983)	Heart Over Mind (1984)	Something to Talk About (1986)

Singles from Heart Over Mind
- 1. "Nobody Loves Me Like You Do" Released: August 27, 1984; 2. "Time Don't Run Out on Me" Released: January 1985

Heart Over Mind is the twenty-first studio album by Canadian country pop artist Anne Murray. It was released by Capitol Records in the fall of 1984. The album peaked at number 4 on the Billboard Top Country Albums chart and was certified Gold by the RIAA.

The disc's first 45, "Nobody Loves Me Like You Do", a duet with Dave Loggins, hit #1 on the U.S. Country singles chart and went Top 10 on Billboard's Adult Contemporary chart. The follow-up single, "Time Don't Run Out on Me", reached #2 Country and #11 A/C. Both singles topped the Canadian Country singles chart.

== Track listing ==
No.	Title	Writer(s)	Length
1.	"Once You've Had It"	Tom Campbell, Randy Sharp	3:58
2.	"Time Don't Run Out on Me"	Gerry Goffin, Carole King	3:41
3.	"I Don't Think I'm Ready for You"	Steve Dorff, Milton Brown, Billy Ray Reynolds, Snuff Garrett	3:16
4.	"Let Your Heart Do the Talking"	Robert Byrne, Alan Schulman	3:39
5.	"You Haven't Heard the Last of Me"	Eric Kaz, Tom Snow	4:12
6.	"Nobody Loves Me Like You Do" (duet with Dave Loggins)	James Dunne, Pamela Phillips	3:52
7.	"I Should Know by Now"	Rory Bourke, Mike Reid	3:33
8.	"Love You Out of Your Mind"	Byrne, Brandon Barnes	3:31
9.	"Take Good Care of My Heart"	Dorff, Peter McCann	3:37
10.	"Our Love"	Billy Livsey, Graham Lyle	3:26

== Personnel ==
- Anne Murray – lead vocals
- Dennis Burnside – acoustic piano (1, 2, 9, 10)
- David Innis – synthesizers (1–5, 8–10)
- Keith Thomas – synthesizers (2, 8)
- John Barlow Jarvis – electric piano (3)
- Doug Riley – acoustic piano (3, 6), electric piano (4, 5, 7, 8)
- Jack Lenz – synthesizers (4, 5, 8), electric piano (6), acoustic piano (7)
- Michael Boddicker – synthesizers (5)
- Steve Gibson – electric guitar (1–3, 9, 10)
- Paul Worley – acoustic guitar (1, 2, 9, 10)
- Mike "Pepe" Francis – acoustic guitar (3), electric guitar (4–8)
- John Hug – electric guitar (4, 8)
- Bob Mann – electric guitar (4, 5, 7, 8), acoustic guitar (6)
- Sonny Garrish – steel guitar (7, 10)
- Tom Robb – bass (1)
- Michael Rhodes – bass (2, 9, 10)
- Tom Szczesniak – bass (3–8)
- James Stroud – drums (1)
- Eddie Bayers – drums (2, 9, 10)
- Barry Keane – drums (3–8)
- Mark Harris – percussion (2)
- Bryan Cumming – saxophone (1)
- Bergen White – string arrangements and conductor
- Carl Gorodetzky – concertmaster
- The Nashville String Machine – strings
- Thom Flora – backing vocals (1, 4, 8)
- Bill Lamb – backing vocals (1, 4, 8)
- Gary Pigg – backing vocals (1, 4, 8)
- Randy Sharp – backing vocals (1)
- Tom Kelly – backing vocals (2, 5)
- Richard Page – backing vocals (2, 5, 9)
- Dave Loggins – lead vocals (6), backing vocals (9)

== Production ==
- Balmur Ltd. – executive producers
- Jim Ed Norman – producer
- Ken Friesen – recording
- Terry Christian – additional recording
- Scott Hendricks – additional recording
- Eric Prestidge – additional recording, mixing, mastering
- Rick Caughron – recording assistant
- Lee Groitzsch – recording assistant
- Tom Henderson – recording assistant
- Alan Henry – recording assistant
- Glenn Meadows – mastering at Masterfonics (Nashville, Tennessee, USA)
- Paige Rowden – production manager
- Paul Cade – art direction, design
- Bill King – photography

== Charts ==
=== Weekly charts ===
Chart (1984–1985)	Peak position
Canadian Albums (RPM)	59
US Billboard 200	92
US Top Country Albums (Billboard)	4

=== Year-end charts ===
Chart (1985)	Position
US Top Country Albums (Billboard)	14
