= I Don't Think I'm Ready for You =

Single by Anne Murray

from the album Heart Over Mind
- B-side: "Take Good Care of My Heart"
- Released: April 1985
- Genre: Country
- Length: 3:16
- Label: Capitol
- Songwriter(s): Steve Dorff; Snuff Garrett; Milton Brown; Billy Ray Reynolds
- Producer(s): Jim Ed Norman

Anne Murray singles chronology
"Time Don't Run Out on Me" (1985)	"I Don't Think I'm Ready for You" (1985)	"Now and Forever (You and Me)" (1986)

"I Don't Think I'm Ready for You" is a song recorded by Canadian country music artist Anne Murray. It was released in April 1985 as the third single from her album Heart Over Mind. The song reached number 4 on the RPM Country Tracks chart in August 1985. The song was written by Steve Dorff, Snuff Garrett, Milton Brown and Billy Ray Reynolds.

== Chart performance ==
Chart (1985)	Peak position
Canadian RPM Country Tracks	4
Canadian RPM Adult Contemporary Tracks	2
U.S. Billboard Hot Country Singles	7
U.S. Billboard Hot Adult Contemporary Tracks	30
