= Whatever I Do (Wherever I Go) =

Single by Hazell Dean

from the album Heart First
- Released: 16 July 1984
- Recorded: 1984
- Genre: Pop; dance; hi-NRG
- Length: 3:47
- Label: Proto Records
- Songwriters: Mike Stock; Matt Aitken
- Producer: Stock Aitken & Waterman

Hazell Dean singles chronology
| "Searchin' (I Gotta Find A Man)" (1984) | "Whatever I Do (Wherever I Go)" (1984) | "Back In My Arms (Once Again)" (1984) |

Audio
- "Whatever I Do (Wherever I Go)" on YouTube

"Whatever I Do (Wherever I Go)" is a Hi-NRG song written and produced by British hit making team Stock Aitken Waterman (SAW), which became a hit for singer Hazell Dean in 1984. Dean, having had a top 10 hit in May 1984 with "Searchin' (I Gotta Find a Man)", was looking for a follow-up single. Through her record company Proto Records she met SAW, who had by then worked with her label mates Divine and Agents Aren't Aeroplanes, but were virtually unknown.

It became an instant smash, peaking at number 4 in the UK Singles Chart, spending 11 weeks in the chart, becoming SAW's first top 10 hit in the UK.

== Background ==
When Dean visited the producers, they played her the backing track of Divine's "You Think You're A Man". She liked it, so she agreed to record a single with them as tensions climbed over the need for a second hit. "She was upset at time," Mike Stock recalled of the high-pressure situation Dean found herself in following her first hit. "I remember her saying at times this was so important to her. [It was] that dreadful follow up situation - how do you follow up a hit?'"

The song SAW offered her was originally titled "Dance Your Love Away", and had previously been given to American artist, Michael Prince, to record. Matt Aitken came up with the idea of using the backing track with re-written lyrics to appease Dean, who disliked the original chorus. Stock and Aitken proceeded to change the track, which was re-titled "Whatever I Do (Wherever I Go)".

Prince was not informed that Dean had recorded a reworked version of the song he'd recorded first, and was at the time waiting to release. He claims he only found out when her version came on while he was dancing in a nightclub, and says he immediately left to ring the producers and demand an explanation. Mike Stock disputes the details of Prince's story, saying the singer actually rang him from his hospital bed after an accident involving a jar of pickles. A reworked version of "Dance Your Love Away" was released as a single in 1985, but did not chart. Due to this success, Dean went on to record her album with SAW. The resulting LP, Heart First, released in October 1984, was fully produced by the trio, except for "Searchin' (I Gotta Find a Man)".

== Chart performance ==
Dean's single was released in July 1984, and it became an instant smash, peaking at number 4 in the UK Singles Chart, spending 11 weeks in the chart. Tying her 1988 single "Who's Leaving Who" its highest placed single in the UK. It was also SAW's first of many top 10 singles in the UK charts.

| Chart (1984) | Peak position |
|---|---|
| UK Singles Chart | 4 |
| Ireland (IRMA) | 6 |
| Ö3 Austria Top 40 | 74 |
| West Germany (GfK) | 22 |

== Other versions and Legacy ==
Dean re-recorded the song for her 1995 album The Best of Hazell Dean. In 1987, Laura Branigan recorded a version of the song for her album, Touch. Her version was also produced by Stock Aitken & Waterman. In 2025, the song was voted by listeners of the A Journey Through Stock Aitken Waterman podcast as the fifteenth greatest SAW record of all time.
