= Hazell Dean =

English pop singer

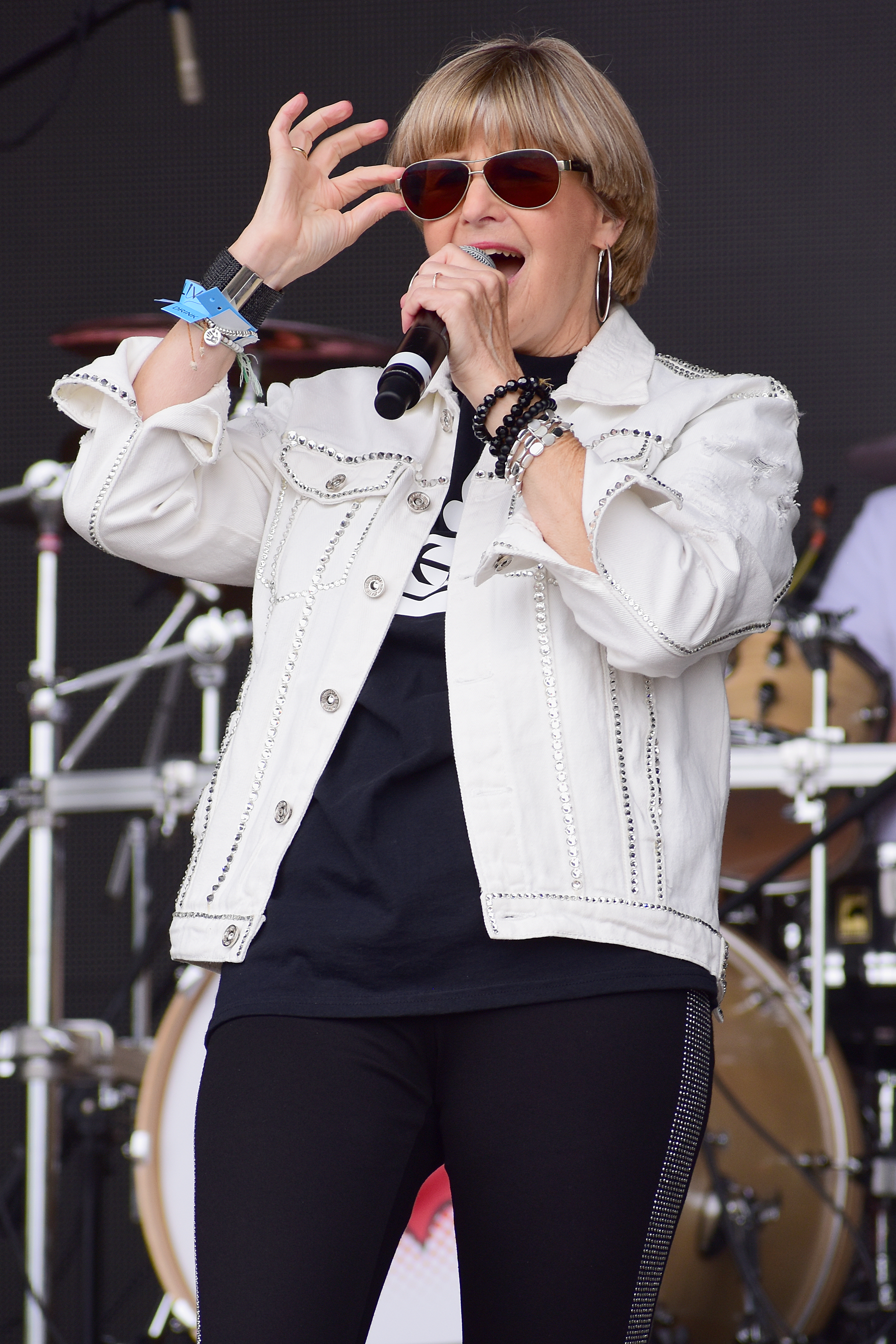
- Dean performing in 2021

Background information
- Born: Hazel Poole; 27 October 1952 (age 73); Great Baddow, Essex, England
- Genres: Dance-pop, hi-NRG
- Occupations: Singer, songwriter
- Years active: 1970–present
- Labels: EMI, Proto
- Website: hazelldean.net

Hazell Dean (née Hazel Diane Poole; born 27 October 1952) is an English dance-pop singer, who achieved her biggest success in the 1980s as a leading hi-NRG artist. She is best known for the top-ten hits in the United Kingdom "Searchin' (I Gotta Find a Man)", "Whatever I Do (Wherever I Go)" and "Who's Leaving Who". She has also worked as a songwriter and producer.

== Career ==
Dean was born in Great Baddow, Essex. She started her career in the early 1970s and came to prominence in the following decade after many years as a club performer and working on the gay scene with her brand of hi-NRG. She was elected three times the "Best Live Performer" by the "Federation of American Dance Clubs" (US), and twice a "Best British Performer" by "Club Mirror Awards" (UK)..

Dean, then billed as Hazel Dean (i.e., with only one 'L' in Hazel), started her career signed to Decca Records releasing six non-charting singles between 1975 and 1978 produced variously by Paul Curtis or Del Newman. Dean participated in the A Song for Europe contest in 1976, and took eighth place (out of twelve) with the ballad, "I Couldn't Live Without You for a Day", written by contest veteran Paul Curtis.

Around 1980, Dean adopted the "Hazell" spelling of her first name, which was used consistently thereafter.

Dean's first album was first released in 1981. The Sound of Bacharach and David was a collection of covers written by Burt Bacharach and Hal David and was only released promotionally to radio stations for them to use the songs to pad out their programming with songs they didn't have to pay so much for in royalties. A very rare album, it was re-released commercially for the first time in 2014. Dean also released a promotional double A-side single for the area of Medway ("Medway You're the One / Medway That's Where I Wanna Be") in 1982. This was re-discovered and put onto YouTube in 2017.

=== Mainstream success ===
Dean decided to put behind her pop/soul sound she had been recording, and issued her first dance record, "Searchin' (I Gotta Find a Man)" in the summer of 1983. While it was a big hit in gay clubs, it only peaked at #76.

In February 1984 she entered the UK Singles Chart with the double A-sided single, "Evergreen" / "Jealous Love" which peaked at #63. In April 1984 Dean participated in "A Song For Europe" again, finishing in seventh place out of eight, with another dramatic ballad, "Stay In My Life", which she wrote herself.

In June 1984, the re-release of "Searchin' (I Gotta Find A Man)" became her first single to reach the UK top 10, peaking at #6. Dean then released the follow-up, "Whatever I Do (Wherever I Go)" (produced by Stock Aitken Waterman), in July which peaked at No. 4. This gave Stock/Aitken/Waterman their first top 10 hit. Further singles, "Back In My Arms (Once Again)" and "No Fool (For Love)" both peaked at #41. These singles were included on her debut mainstream pop album, Heart First, which did not sell well and failed to chart.

In 1985 the single "Harmony" (written by Bill Clift and Peter Marsh) was released in Germany on the Bellaphon label. In 1985 Dean signed with label EMI Records, releasing the Stock/Aitken/Waterman-produced single "They Say It's Gonna Rain", which included lyrics in Zulu and reached #58 on the UK Singles Chart, and became a #1 single in South Africa. Subsequent singles fared worse with "ESP", "Stand Up" and "Always (Doesn't Mean Forever)" failing to reach the UK top 75. In early 1988 however, she achieved her biggest hit in four years with "Who's Leaving Who", which reached #4.

The follow-up singles, "Maybe (We Should Call it a Day)" and "Turn It into Love" (also recorded by Kylie Minogue and included on her debut album, Kylie) peaked at #15 and #21 respectively.

Her second album, Always, was released in October 1988 and featured many of the singles from the previous three years, as well as new material. The album charted at #38 in the UK.

=== 1990s ===
Dean left EMI and signed with Lisson Records, releasing two singles for the label. The first was a cover of Yvonne Elliman's "Love Pains" in 1989, produced by PWL producers Phil Harding and Ian Curnow. It reached #48 on the UK Singles Chart. More than 18 months elapsed before Dean's next single was released, the Stock/Aitken/Waterman penned and produced "Better Off Without You", originally recorded by Lonnie Gordon. It was her final UK top 75 chart entry, peaking at #72.

Dean then began working with Ian Levine, who had previously remixed and produced tracks with her in the mid-1980s.

During this time, Dean produced and wrote songs for Bad Boys Inc, Bona Riah (produced "House of Rising Sun"), Miquel Brown (produced "It's a Sin"), MEN 2 B (co-wrote "Love Satisfaction"), Upside Down and Sandra Feva.

1996 saw the release of Dean's next album, The Winner Takes It All, which was released on Carlton Records. This album contained covers of ABBA songs. The title track was released as a single. In 1999, Dean released a cover version of Bon Jovi's "Living On A Prayer" and, in 2001, a remixed version of "Who's Leaving Who" was released. Neither of these singles charted.

=== Recent career ===
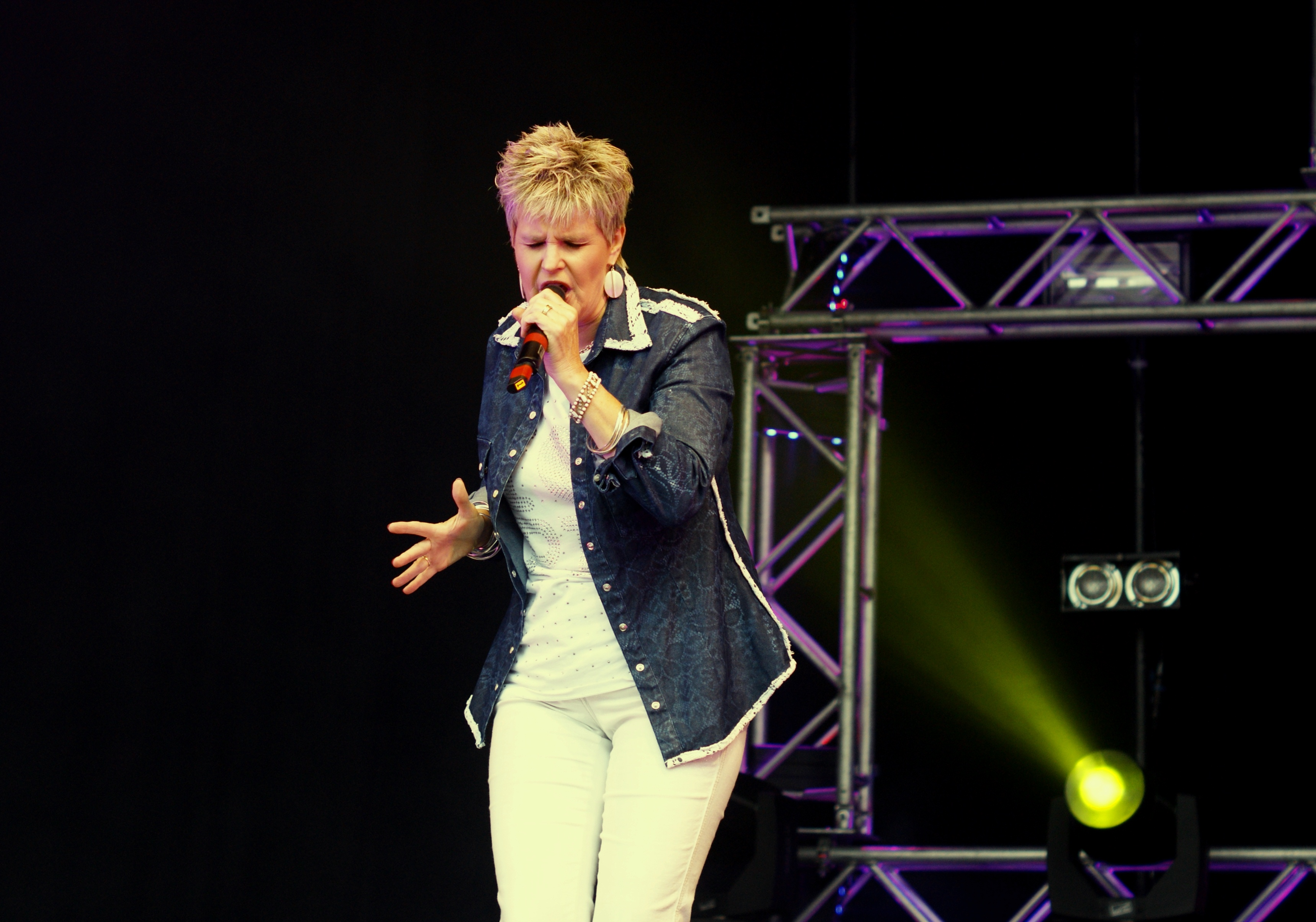
Dean performing in 2011

In 2007, Dean recorded "Trade Him for a Newer Model" (written by Clive Scott, Dean, and Ian Levine, and produced by Scott and Levine) for the album Disco 2008. The music video for Trade Him for a Newer Model was released on YouTube by Levine in 2007.

In 2009, several songs that had not been released on any Dean album their original form were released on iTunes, including some previously unreleased remixes. Cherry Red Records re-issued Dean's first mainstream pop album, Heart First, in early 2010.

2010 saw Hazell Dean sign to the dance label, Energise Records. Dean recorded an updated version of her 1985 single, "They Say It's Gonna Rain". "Shattered Glass", "In The Name Of Love", "This Is My Life", "We Belong/Can You Feel It" and "I Close My Eyes & Count To Ten" were released as singles from her 2013 album, "In The Name Of...".

Cherry Red Records released a Deluxe Edition of Always on 23 April 2012. On 10 September 2012, a 21 track greatest hits collection, Evergreen: The Very Best of Hazell Dean, was released through Music Club Deluxe Records. The CD pressing features a bonus disc of 11 remixes and rare extended mixes of Dean's 1980s hits. On 21 December 2012, Dean performed at the Stock/Aitken/Waterman "Hit Factory Live" reunion concert at London's O2 Arena, along with many other former Stock/Aitken/Waterman acts.

In 2013, Dean released the album In the Name of..., through Energise records. 2015 saw her release the singles "24 Hours" and "Nightlife", again with Energise, both taken from the album Nightlife released the same year. 2016 saw the release of two EPs through Energise records – "Evergreen/Judgement Day" and "Happy New Year/ The Way Old Friends Do" She continues to perform live and occasionally records with various producers, with tracks appearing via her official website.

In August 2021, Dean announced her retirement from live performing, with her last live show being on 18 September at Lets Rock Leeds and Wentworth Festival.

Hazell continues to release music through SP Music.

=== Gay following ===
After the success of "Searchin'", Dean made her LGBT club debut at Heaven in London in 1983 and has subsequently enjoyed a large LGBT following. Acknowledging the support she has received from the LGBT community throughout her career, Dean frequently performed at LGBT Pride events both in the UK and abroad. On 29 August 2021, after 38 years, Dean played her last Pride performance in Hastings, where she also announced her retirement from live shows.

== Personal life ==
Dean is an out lesbian who has been in a long-term relationship since 1991 and has been in a civil partnership since 2005. Her daughter was born in December 2004. Dean has a sister and an older brother who still live in their birthplace in Essex.

Dean has spoken out against prejudice aimed at the trans community. Dean is a patron of Pride in Surrey and, in 2021, donated her memorabilia collection to the Bishopsgate Institute in London.

== Discography ==
=== Albums ===
1. ¿Quien Era Esa Chica Con La Que Te Vi? (1978)
2. The Sound of Bacharach & David (1981)
3. Heart First (1984)
4. Always (1988)
5. The Winner Takes It All (1996)
6. In The Name Of ... (2013)
7. Nightlife (2015)
8. 8 (2022)
9. Let's Go Round Again (2026)

=== Compilation albums ===
- The Dean & Ware Collection (2021)

=== Remix albums ===
- Re:Xtended (2017)
- Re:Visited (2017)

=== Singles ===
Year	Title	Peak chart positions												
Year	Title	UK	IRE	AUS	AUT	BEL (FLA)	GER	NED	NOR	NZ	SA	SWE	SWI	Album
1975	"Our Day Will Come"	—	—	—	—	—	—	—	—	—	—	—	—	
1976	"I Couldn't Live Without You for a Day"	—	—	—	—	—	—	—	—	—	—	—	—	
1976	"Got You Where I Want You"	—	—	—	—	—	—	—	—	—	—	—	—	
1976	"Look What I've Found at the End of a Rainbow"	—	—	—	—	—	—	—	—	—	—	—	—	
1977	"No One's Ever Gonna Love You"	—	—	—	—	—	—	—	—	—	—	—	—	
1977	"Who Was That Lady"	—	—	—	—	—	—	—	—	—	—	—	—	
1981	"You Got Me Wrong"	—	—	—	—	—	—	—	—	—	—	—	—	
1982	"Medway...You're The One / Medway That's Where I Wanna Be (Promo Single)"	—	—	—	—	—	—	—	—	—	—	—	—	
1983	"Searchin' (I Gotta Find a Man)"	76	—	—	—	—	—	—	—	—	—	—	—	
1984	"Evergreen" / "Jealous Love"	63	—	—	—	—	—	—	—	—	—	—	—	
1984	"Stay in My Life"	—	—	—	—	—	—	—	—	—	—	—	—	
1984	"Searchin' (I Gotta Find a Man)" (re-issue)	6	7	17	—	6	38	24	—	—	14	—	—	
1984	"Whatever I Do (Wherever I Go)"	4	6	74	—	—	22	—	—	—	—	—	—	
1984	"Back in My Arms (Once Again)"	41	—	—	—	—	44	—	—	—	—	—	—	
1985	"No Fool (For Love)"	41	—	—	—	—	—	—	—	—	—	—	—	
1985	"Harmony (Germany Only Release)"	—	—	—	—	—	—	—	—	—	—	—	—	
1985	"Devil in You (Germany Only Release)"	—	—	—	—	—	—	—	—	—	—	—	—	
1985	"They Say It's Gonna Rain"	58	—	—	—	—	—	—	6	—	1	6	—	
1986	"E. S. P. (Extra Sensual Persuasion)"	98	—	—	—	—	—	—	—	—	—	—	—	
1986	"Walk In My Shoes (Netherlands Only Release)"	—	—	—	—	—	—	—	—	—	—	—	—	
1986	"Stand Up"	79	—	—	—	—	—	—	—	—	—	—	—	
1987	"Always Doesn't Mean Forever"	92	—	—	—	—	—	—	—	—	—	—	—	
1988	"Who's Leaving Who"	4	2	—	17	17	15	34	—	44	16	—	11	
1988	"Maybe (We Should Call it a Day)"	15	12	—	—	—	34	—	—	—	—	—	23	
1988	"Turn It into Love"	21	21	—	—	—	—	—	—	—	—	—	30	
1989	"Love Pains"	48	—	157	—	—	—	51	—	—	—	—	—	
1991	"Better Off Without You"	72	—	—	—	—	—	—	—	—	—	—	—	
1993	"My Idea of Heaven"	160	—	—	—	—	—	—	—	—	—	—	—	
1994	"Power & Passion"	94	—	—	—	—	—	—	—	—	—	—	—	
1996	"The Winner Takes It All"	82	—	—	—	—	—	—	—	—	—	—	—	
1997	"Searchin' '97"	92	—	—	—	—	—	—	—	—	—	—	—	
1998	"Sisters Are Doin' It for Themselves"	—	—	—	—	—	—	—	—	—	—	—	—	
1999	"Living on a Prayer"	—	—	—	—	—	—	—	—	—	—	—	—	
2001	"Who's Leaving Who 2001"	—	—	—	—	—	—	—	—	—	—	—	—	
2004	"Searchin' (21st Anniversary 2004 Remix)"	—	—	—	—	—	—	—	—	—	—	—	—	
2009	"Can't Help The Way That I Feel"	—	—	—	—	—	—	—	—	—	—	—	—	
2011	"They Say it's Gonna Rain 2011"	—	—	—	—	—	—	—	—	—	—	—	—	
2011	"Shattered Glass"	—	—	—	—	—	—	—	—	—	—	—	—	
2012	"In the Name of Love"	—	—	—	—	—	—	—	—	—	—	—	—	
2013	"This Is My Life"	—	—	—	—	—	—	—	—	—	—	—	—	
2013	"We Belong/Can You Feel It"	—	—	—	—	—	—	—	—	—	—	—	—	
2014	"I Close My Eyes & Count To Ten"	—	—	—	—	—	—	—	—	—	—	—	—	
2015	"24 Hours"	—	—	—	—	—	—	—	—	—	—	—	—	
2015	"Searchin' (I Gotta Find A Man) Almighty Mixes"	—	—	—	—	—	—	—	—	—	—	—	—	
2015	"Nightlife"	—	—	—	—	—	—	—	—	—	—	—	—	
2016	"Evergreen/Judgement Day"	—	—	—	—	—	—	—	—	—	—	—	—	
2016	"Happy New Year/The Way Old Friends Do"	—	—	—	—	—	—	—	—	—	—	—	—	
2019	"Because the Night" / "Heavenly"	—	—	—	—	—	—	—	—	—	—	—	—	
2021	"Happy New Year (Sparklers Mix)"	—	—	—	—	—	—	—	—	—	—	—	—	
2022	"Out Of Control (Back In Control Mix)"	—	—	—	—	—	—	—	—	—	—	—	—	
2022	"The Way Old Friends Do (The Moonwalking Mix)"	—	—	—	—	—	—	—	—	—	—	—	—	
2022	"Suddenly Love Came Around"	—	—	—	—	—	—	—	—	—	—	—	—	
2023	"100% Pure Love"	—	—	—	—	—	—	—	—	—	—	—	—	
2024	"Searchin' (40th Anniversary Remixes)"	—	—	—	—	—	—	—	—	—	—	—	—	
2024	"Whatever I Do (Wherever I Go) - (The JNR Remixes)"	—	—	—	—	—	—	—	—	—	—	—	—	
2024	2024	"Love Pains (The JNR Remixes)"	—	—	—	—	—	—	—	—	—	—	—	
2025	"Evergreen (Re-Imagined)"	—	—	—	—	—	—	—	—	—	—	—	—	
2025	"They Say it's Gonna Rain (The JNR Remixes)"	—	—	—	—	—	—	—	—	—	—	—	—	
2026	"Who's Leaving Who (The JNR Remixes)"	—	—	—	—	—	—	—	—	—	—	—	—	
2026	"Turn It Into love (The JNR Remixes)"	—	—	—	—	—	—	—	—	—	—	—	—	
2026	"Long Time Gone"	—	—	—	—	—	—	—	—	—	—	—	—	
"—" denotes releases that did not chart or were not released in that territory.
