= Dave Loggins =

American musician (1947–2024)

- Born: David Allen Loggins; November 10, 1947; Mountain City, Tennessee, U.S.
- Died: July 10, 2024 (aged 76) Nashville, Tennessee, U.S.
- Genres: Pop; country
- Occupations: Singer-songwriter; musician
- Instruments: Vocals; guitar
- Years active: 1972–1985
- Labels: Epic; Vanguard

David Allen Loggins (November 10, 1947 – July 10, 2024) was an American singer, songwriter, and musician. He is best known for his 1974 hit single "Please Come to Boston" as well as his 1984 duet with Anne Murray, "Nobody Loves Me Like You Do".

== Musical career ==
Loggins wrote his 1974 composition "Please Come to Boston", which reached No. 5 on the pop chart (No. 1 on the Easy Listening chart) in the U.S. He also wrote the song "Pieces of April" for the band Three Dog Night, which was a top 20 success in 1973. He had written songs for Jimmy Buffett (Buffett's "Come Monday" was bumped from the charts by "Please Come to Boston" in late July 1974), Tanya Tucker, Restless Heart, Wynonna Judd, Reba McEntire, Gary Morris, Billy Ray Cyrus, Alabama, Toby Keith, Don Williams, and Crystal Gayle. Loggins wrote the number one hits "Morning Desire" by Kenny Rogers and "You Make Me Want To Make You Mine" by Juice Newton.

During 1984, he recorded "Nobody Loves Me Like You Do," a duet with Anne Murray, which scored number one on the Billboard Hot Country Singles chart. Loggins and Murray were named Vocal Duo of the Year at the CMA Awards during 1985. One of Loggins' most famous musical compositions is "Augusta," which he wrote while visiting the Augusta National Golf Club in 1981. The same year, CBS began using the song at the Masters Golf Tournament as the theme song for its coverage each year. In 1982, David Lasley released a cover version of Loggins’ “If I Had My Wish Tonight”, originally released by Loggins in 1979.

In 1995, Loggins was inducted to the Nashville Songwriters Hall of Fame.

== Personal life and death ==
David Allen Loggins was born on November 10, 1947, in Mountain City, Tennessee. Before becoming a musician, Loggins was employed as a draftsman and as an insurance salesman.

His second cousin, Kenny Loggins, is also a singer-songwriter.

Loggins died in Nashville on July 10, 2024, at the age of 76.

== Discography ==
=== Studio albums ===
Year	Album details	Peak chart positions	
Year	Album details	US	CAN
1972	Personal Belongings: Release date: February 1972; Label: Vanguard	—	—
1974	Apprentice (In a Musical Workshop): Release date: October 1974; Label: Epic	53	74
1976	Country Suite: Release date: 1976; Label: Epic	—	—
1977	One Way Ticket to Paradise: Release date: October 1977; Label: Epic	—	—
1979	David Loggins: Release date: 1979; Label: Epic	—	—
"—" denotes releases that did not chart

=== Singles ===
Year	Single	Peak chart positions				Album
Year	Single	US	US AC	CAN	AUS	Album
1972	"Claudia"	—	—	—	—	Personal Belongings
1973	"Think'n of You"	—	—	—	—	Personal Belongings
1974	"Please Come to Boston"	5	1	4	47	Apprentice (In a Musical Workshop)
1974	"Someday"	57	—	83	—	Apprentice (In a Musical Workshop)
1974	"Girl from Knoxville"	—	—	—	—	Apprentice (In a Musical Workshop)
1976	"Movin' to the Country"	—	—	—	—	Country Suite
1976	"Savior of My Natural Life"	—	—	—	—	Country Suite
1977	"Ship in a Bottle"	—	—	—	—	One Way Ticket to Paradise
1977	"One Way Ticket to Paradise"	—	—	—	—	One Way Ticket to Paradise
1977	"Three Little Words (I Love You)"	—	—	—	—	One Way Ticket to Paradise
1978	"So Much for Dreams"	—	—	—	—	Our Winning Season (soundtrack)
1979	"The Fool in Me"	—	—	—	—	David Loggins
1979	"Pieces of April"	—	22	—	—	David Loggins
"—" denotes releases that did not chart

=== Guest singles ===
Year	Single	Artist	Peak chart positions						Album
Year	Single	Artist	US Bubbling	US AC	US Country	CAN	CAN AC	CAN Country	Album
1984	"Nobody Loves Me Like You Do"	Anne Murray	3	10	1	79	1	1	Heart Over Mind
1985	"Just as Long as I Have You"	Gus Hardin	—	—	72	—	—	52	—N/a
"—" denotes releases that did not chart
