= Just Another Woman in Love =

1984 single by Anne Murray

Single by Anne Murray

from the album A Little Good News
- B-side: "Heart Stealer"
- Released: March 1984
- Genre: Country
- Length: 2:56
- Label: Capitol
- Songwriters: Patti Ryan; Wanda Mallette
- Producer: Jim Ed Norman

Anne Murray singles chronology
"That's Not the Way (It's S'posed to Be)" (1984)	"Just Another Woman in Love" (1984)	"Nobody Loves Me Like You Do" (1984)

"Just Another Woman in Love" is a song written by Wanda Mallette and Patti Ryan, and recorded by Canadian country music singer Anne Murray. It was released in the spring of 1984 as the third single from her gold-certified album A Little Good News.

"Just Another Woman in Love" was Murray's eighth No. 1 hit on the Billboard Country singles chart, and spent a total of 20 weeks on the chart. "Just Another Woman in Love" also hit the top 10 on the US Adult Contemporary chart.

== Chart performance ==
=== Weekly charts ===
Chart (1984)	Peak position
Canadian RPM Country Tracks	1
Canadian RPM Adult Contemporary Tracks	1
US Adult Contemporary (Billboard)	7
US Hot Country Songs (Billboard)	1

=== Year-end charts ===
Chart (1984)	Position
US Adult Contemporary (Billboard)	48
US Hot Country Songs (Billboard)	9

== Cover versions and parodies ==
In 2018, Filipino YouTuber Vic Desucatan uploaded a parody version of the song called "Manok na Pula" (transl. "Red Chicken"), which was initially created by Jomar Torillo. Desucatan's version became a viral hit in the Philippines in 2019.
