= Nobody Loves Me Like You Do =

Single by Anne Murray with Dave Loggins

from the album Heart over Mind
- B-side: "Love You Out of Your Mind"
- Released: August 27, 1984
- Genre: Country
- Length: 3:51
- Label: Capitol
- Songwriters: James Dunne; Pamela Phillips
- Producer: Jim Ed Norman

Anne Murray singles chronology
"Just Another Woman in Love" (1984)	"Nobody Loves Me Like You Do" (1984)	"Time Don't Run Out on Me" (1985)

"Nobody Loves Me Like You Do" is a song written by James Dunne and Pamela Phillips-Oland, and originally performed on the CBS soap opera As the World Turns by Dunne himself with series regular Tonya Pinkins. It was later recorded by Jermaine Jackson with a then-unknown Whitney Houston, and also by Canadian country music artist Anne Murray with singer-songwriter Dave Loggins. Jackson and Houston actually premiered their version on As the World Turns as well, on the August 1, 1984 episode, while the Murray-Loggins version was released as a country single shortly thereafter, in September of '84. The former appeared on Houston's 1985 self-titled debut album and on the 2009 compilation album, The Collection. The latter was the first single from Murray's album Heart over Mind, peaking at number one on December 15, 1984. It was Murray's ninth American number-one country hit, and it also hit the top ten on the Billboard Adult Contemporary chart. The song was Loggins' only hit on the country chart. In live performances, Murray sang the duet with Billie Hughes. The song also appears on Murray's 2007 album Anne Murray Duets: Friends & Legends, performed as a duet with her daughter, Dawn Langstroth.

== Charts (for the Murray-Loggins version) ==
Chart (1984)	Peak position
Canadian RPM Country Tracks	1
Canadian RPM Top Singles	79
Canadian RPM Adult Contemporary Tracks	1
US Hot Country Songs (Billboard)	1
US Billboard Bubbling Under Hot 100	3
US Billboard Hot Adult Contemporary Tracks	10
