= A Little Good News (album) =

Studio album by Anne Murray
- Released: August 2, 1983
- Studios: Eastern Sound (Toronto, Canada); Audio Media Recorders and Emerald Sound Studios (Nashville, Tennessee, USA); Redwing Studios (Tarzana, California, USA); Sunset Sound Recorders (Hollywood, California, USA)
- Genre: Country
- Length: 33:19
- Label: Capitol
- Producer: Jim Ed Norman

Anne Murray chronology
The Hottest Night of the Year (1982)	A Little Good News (1983)	Heart over Mind (1984)

Singles from A Little Good News
- 1. "A Little Good News" Released: September 1983; 2. "That's Not the Way (It's S'posed to Be)" Released: 1984; 3. "Just Another Woman in Love" Released: March 1984

Professional ratings
Review scores
Source	Rating
Allmusic	3/5 stars

A Little Good News is the twentieth studio album by Canadian country pop artist Anne Murray, released in 1983 via Capitol Records. The album peaked at number 9 on the Billboard Top Country Albums chart and was certified Gold by the RIAA.

The title track topped the Country singles charts in the United States. "That's Not the Way (It's S'posed to Be)" and "Just Another Woman in Love" were released as follow-up singles, with the latter hitting #1.

In 1984, A Little Good News was honored with a CMA Award for 'Album of the Year'.

== Track listing ==
No.	Title	Writer(s)	Length
1.	"That's Not the Way (It's S'posed to Be)"	Andy Goldmark, Phil Galdston	3:19
2.	"I'm Not Afraid Anymore"	Robert Quinn	3:07
3.	"A Little Good News"	Rory Bourke, Tommy Rocco, Charlie Black	3:08
4.	"The More We Try"	Kenny Loggins, Eva Loggins	3:48
5.	"Come On Love"	Rafe Van Hoy, Austin Roberts	4:04
6.	"Come to Me"	Bobby Braddock, Curly Putman	2:31
7.	"Sentimental Favorite"	Rocco, Black	3:29
8.	"Just Another Woman in Love"	Patti Ryan, Wanda Mallette	2:56
9.	"When I Can't Have You"	Richard Butler, Michael Barnes	3:44
10.	"Heart Stealer"	Randy Goodrum, Joe Wilson	3:13

== Personnel ==
- Anne Murray – vocals, backing vocals (2, 5, 8, 10)
- Michael Boddicker – synthesizers (1, 9, 10)
- Jack Lenz – synthesizers (1, 2, 6), electric piano (4, 7, 9, 10)
- Doug Riley – acoustic piano (2, 4, 5, 7, 8), electric piano (6)
- Dennis Burnside – electric piano (3, 8), synthesizers (5)
- Bobby Ogdin – acoustic piano (3)
- Mike "Pepe" Francis – electric guitars (1, 2, 6), acoustic guitars (2, 6, 7), guitars (4)
- Bob Mann – electric guitars (1, 6, 7), acoustic guitars (2, 6), guitars (4)
- Steve Gibson – electric guitars (2, 3, 5, 8)
- Rafe Van Hoy – acoustic guitars (3, 5, 8)
- Paul Worley – electric guitars (3, 5), acoustic guitars (8)
- Tom Szczesniak – bass (2, 4, 6, 7, 9, 10)
- Joe Osborn – bass (3, 5, 8)
- Barry Keane – drums (1, 2, 4, 6, 7, 9, 10)
- Eddie Bayers – drums (3, 5, 8)
- Bryan Cumming – saxophone (9)
- Nick DeCaro – string arrangements and conductor (3)
- Rick Wilkins – string arrangements and conductor (4)
- Peter Cardinali – string arrangements and conductor (8)
- Bill Champlin – backing vocals (1, 9)
- Tom Kelly – backing vocals (1, 9)
- Bruce Murray – backing vocals (2, 10)
- Deborah Schaal Greimann – backing vocals (2, 5, 8, 10)
- Tom Brannon – backing vocals (3)
- Philip Forrest – backing vocals (3)
- Donna Sheridan – backing vocals (3)
- Lisa Silver – backing vocals (3)
- Randy Sharp – backing vocals (6)

=== Production ===
- Balmur Ltd. – executive producers
- Jim Ed Norman – producer
- Ken Friesen – recording
- Tom Henderson – recording assistant
- Marshall Morgan – mixing, additional recording
- Eric Prestidge – additional recording
- Larry Hines – additional recording assistant
- Richard McKernan – additional recording assistant
- Giles Reaves – additional recording assistant
- Ken Perry – mastering at Masterfonics (Nashville, Tennessee, USA)
- Paul Cade – art direction, design
- Bill King – photography

== Charts ==
=== Weekly charts ===
Chart (1983–1984)	Peak position
Canada Country Albums (RPM)	3
Canada Albums (RPM)	57
US Billboard 200	72
US Top Country Albums (Billboard)	9

=== Year-end charts ===
Chart (1984)	Position
US Top Country Albums (Billboard)	21

== Certifications ==
Region	Certification	Certified units/sales
Canada (Music Canada)	Gold	50,000^{^}
United States (RIAA)	Gold	500,000^{^}
^{^} Shipments figures based on certification alone.
