= Time Don't Run Out on Me =

Single by Anne Murray

from the album Heart Over Mind
- B-side: "Let Your Heart Do the Talking"
- Released: January 1985
- Genre: Country
- Length: 3:41
- Label: Capitol
- Songwriter(s): Gerry Goffin; Carole King
- Producer(s): Jim Ed Norman

Anne Murray singles chronology
"Nobody Loves Me Like You Do" (1984)	"Time Don't Run Out on Me" (1985)	"I Don't Think I'm Ready for You" (1985)

"Time Don't Run Out on Me" is a song written by Gerry Goffin and Carole King, and recorded by Canadian country music artist Anne Murray. It was released in January 1985 as the second single from the Gold-selling album Heart Over Mind.

The track hit #1 on the RPM Country Tracks chart in Canada in April 1985. and also reached at #2 on the Billboard Hot Country Singles chart in the United States.

The song also appears on Murray's 2007 album Anne Murray Duets: Friends & Legends, recorded as a duet with the song's co-composer, Carole King.

== Charts ==
=== Weekly charts ===
Chart (1985)	Peak position
Canadian RPM Country Tracks	1
Canadian RPM Adult Contemporary Tracks	2
US Hot Country Songs (Billboard)	2
US Adult Contemporary (Billboard)	11

=== Year-end charts ===
Chart (1985)	Position
US Hot Country Songs (Billboard)	22
