= A Little Good News (song) =

Single by Anne Murray

from the album A Little Good News
- B-side: "I'm Not Afraid Anymore"
- Released: September 1983 (US)
- Genre: Country
- Length: 3:08
- Label: Capitol
- Songwriters: Tommy Rocco; Charlie Black; Rory Bourke
- Producer: Jim Ed Norman

Anne Murray singles chronology
"Somebody's Always Saying Goodbye" (1982)	"A Little Good News" (1983)	"That's Not the Way (It's S'posed to Be)" (1984)

"A Little Good News" is a song recorded by Canadian recording artist Anne Murray. It was released in September 1983 as the lead single from the album of the same name. The song was written by Tommy Rocco, Charlie Black, and Rory Bourke and was Anne Murray's seventh #1 hit on the Billboard country chart.

In the United States, the single hit #1 Country (lasting a total of 20 weeks on the Country chart overall), #10 Adult Contemporary, and #74 Pop. The song also appears on Murray's 2007 album Anne Murray Duets: Friends & Legends, performed as a duet with the Indigo Girls.

This song was used as the opening theme to the 1984-2000 CJON-DT program of the same name (later renamed NTV.ca), but has since been removed from reruns.

== Content ==
In the song, the narrator expresses despair over all of the violence and suffering she reads about in newspapers and witnesses on TV news coverage, and notes how wonderful it would be if, for just one day, the newspapers and television news anchors had nothing to report, because they had "nothing bad to say". The song also gives references to Bryant Gumbel reporting on "the fighting in Lebanon".

== Chart performance ==
Chart (1983)	Peak position
Canadian RPM Country Tracks	1
Canadian RPM Adult Contemporary Tracks	2
US Hot Country Songs (Billboard)	1
US Adult Contemporary (Billboard)	11
US Billboard Hot 100	74
UK Singles Chart	92

== Awards and honors ==
In 1984, "A Little Good News" won the Grammy Award for Best Country Vocal Performance, Female. It was Murray's fourth career Grammy honor. The song was also named the Country Music Association's Single of the Year.

== See also ==
- List of anti-war songs
