= This Time – The First Four Years =

This Time - The First Four Years

Compilation album by Culture Club
- Released: 6 April 1987
- Recorded: 1982–1986
- Genre: New wave, pop, rock, reggae, country, blue-eyed soul
- Length: 48:07 (LP/MC); 62:15 (CD)
- Label: Virgin; Epic (US)
- Producer: Steve Levine

Culture Club chronology
From Luxury to Heartache (1986)	This Time - The First Four Years (1987)	At Worst... The Best of Boy George and Culture Club (1993)

Professional ratings
Review scores
Source	Rating
AllMusic	4/5 stars

This Time – The First Four Years is the first official greatest hits album by British pop band Culture Club, released by Virgin Records on 6 April 1987. Its release came one year after the band had split up.

== Overview ==
The compilation exclusively includes, in its vinyl edition, Culture Club's most successful hits. The one track which was never available in single format is "Black Money" (originally on the band's second album, Colour by Numbers), which was intended to be released to promote this collection, but never actually came out. The album includes a wide selection of tracks taken from all their albums (including more than half the tracks from the Colour by Numbers album), as well as the group's contribution to the Electric Dreams film soundtrack; "Love Is Love". For many countries, it was the first time that their hit single "Time (Clock of the Heart)" was included on an album.

Two additional tracks are featured on the CD and cassette version: the remix of "I'll Tumble 4 Ya" and the US 12" medley of "It's a Miracle" and "Miss Me Blind".

The bulk of these tracks would be re-issued on numerous compilations for years after.

== Release details ==
Country	Date	Label	Format	Catalogue N°
UK	1987	Virgin	CD	CDVTV 1
UK	1987	Virgin	MC	MCVTV 1
UK	1987	Virgin	vinyl LP	VTV 1

== Track listing ==
All tracks are written by Culture Club, except as noted.

No.	Title	Writer(s)	Original album	Length
1.	"Karma Chameleon"	George O'Dowd, Jon Moss, Michael Craig, Roy Hay & Phil Pickett	Colour by Numbers	4:01
2.	"Church of the Poison Mind"		Colour by Numbers	3:31
3.	"Miss Me Blind"			4:29
4.	"Time (Clock of the Heart)"		Kissing to Be Clever (US Edition)	3:43
5.	"It's a Miracle"	O'Dowd, Hay, Craig, Moss, Pickett	Colour by Numbers	3:25
6.	"Black Money"		Colour by Numbers	5:19
7.	"Do You Really Want to Hurt Me"		Kissing to Be Clever	4:24
8.	"Move Away"	O'Dowd, Hay, Craig, Moss, Pickett	From Luxury to Heartache	4:10
9.	"I'll Tumble 4 Ya"		Kissing to Be Clever	2:35
10.	"Love Is Love"		Electric Dreams	3:52
11.	"The War Song"		Waking Up with the House on Fire	3:59
12.	"Victims"		Colour by Numbers	4:55
13.	"I'll Tumble 4 Ya" (CD bonus track)		U.S. 12" Remix	4:40
14.	"It's a Miracle / Miss Me Blind" (CD bonus track)	O'Dowd, Hay, Craig, Moss, Pickett	U.S. 12" Remix	9:12
Total length:				62:15

== Personnel ==
=== Band/musicians ===
- Boy George: lead vocals and lyrics
- Roy Hay: guitars, keyboards, sitar, synth guitar
- Mikey Craig: bass
- Jon Moss: drums and percussion
- Helen Terry: female lead and background vocals
- for the other musicians, see Culture Club's first four albums

=== Staff/production ===
- Steve Levine: production, except track 8
- Arif Mardin, Lew Hahn: production on track 8
- Assorted iMaGes: album cover
- David Levine, Jamie Morgan, Mark LeBon, Kate Garner, Stevie Hughes: photography
- Mitaka: booklet Japanese translation
- for the other members of staff and production, see Culture Club's first four albums

== Charts ==
Chart	Peak position
UK Albums Chart	8

== Certifications ==
Region	Certification	Certified units/sales
United Kingdom (BPI)	Gold	100,000^{^}
^{^} Shipments figures based on certification alone.
