= Collect – 12″ Mixes Plus =

Compilation album by Culture Club
- Released: 1991
- Recorded: 1982–1987
- Genres: New wave; pop; rock; reggae
- Length: 63:42
- Labels: Virgin VIP; EMI Gold; Caroline (US)
- Producers: Steve Levine; Arif Mardin; Lew Hahn; Tony Swain

Culture Club chronology
The Best of Culture Club (1989)	Collect – 12″ Mixes Plus (1991)	Spin Dazzle – The Best of Boy George and Culture Club (1992)

Professional ratings
Review scores
Source	Rating
AllMusic	3/5 stars

Collect – 12″ Mixes Plus is a compilation album by English band Culture Club, first released in 1991 by Virgin for the VIP series. The album includes remixes and extended versions of Culture Club songs that were recorded for their first four albums (1982–1986) plus a couple of their stand-out tracks, some B-sides as well as the P. W. Botha 12″ remix of lead singer Boy George's solo British and European number one single "Everything I Own".

== Track listing ==
All tracks written by Culture Club, except where noted.

No.	Title	Writer(s)	Origin	Length
1.	"Move Away" (12" mix)	Culture Club; Phil Pickett	From Luxury to Heartache (1986 album)	7:28
2.	"It's a Miracle / Miss Me Blind" (US 12" mix)	Culture Club; Pickett / Culture Club	Colour by Numbers (1983 album)	9:10
3.	"God Thank You Woman" (extended version)	Culture Club; Pickett	From Luxury to Heartache	7:04
4.	"I'll Tumble 4 Ya" (US 12" remix)		Kissing to Be Clever (1982 album)	4:38
5.	"Love Is Cold (You Were Never No Good)"		B-side on 12" version of "Do You Really Want to Hurt Me" (1982 single)	4:22
6.	"Do You Really Want to Hurt Me" (dub version; featuring Pappa Weasel)		B-side to "Do You Really Want to Hurt Me" (1982 single)	3:38
7.	"Everything I Own" (extended P. W. Botha mix)	David Gates	Sold (1987 Boy George album)	7:13
8.	"Colour by Numbers"		B-side to "Victims" (1983 single)	3:57
9.	"From Luxury to Heartache"	Culture Club; Pickett	B-side to "God Thank You Woman" (1986 single)	4:23
10.	"Romance Beyond the Alphabet" ("Time (Clock of the Heart)" instrumental)		B-side on UK 12" version of "Time (Clock of the Heart)" (1982 single); B-side on US version of "Time (Clock of the Heart)" (1983 single)	3:46
11.	"Black Money"		Colour by Numbers	5:19
12.	"Love Is Love"	O'Dowd; Hay	Electric Dreams (1984 film soundtrack)	3:51
13.	"Man Shake"		B-side to "Church of the Poison Mind" (1983 single)	2:35
14.	"The War Song" (Ultimate Dance Mix)		Waking Up with the House on Fire (1984 album)	6:18

== Personnel ==
- Boy George – male vocals
- Mikey Craig – bass
- Roy Hay – guitar, piano, keyboards, sitar, electric guitar
- Jon Moss – percussion, drums; mix on track 8
- Helen Terry – female vocals
- Arif Mardin, Lew Hahn: production on tracks 1, 3
- Steve Levine: production on tracks 2, 4–6, 8, 10–14; mix on track 8
- Stewart Levine: production on track 7
- Tony Swain: production on track 9
- Richard Lengyer: engineer on track 5
- Gordon Milne: assistant engineer on track 6
- Glen Skinner: engineer on track 7
- Acos Kaikitis for P.D.S.: sleeve design

== Release history ==
Region	Date	Format	Label	Catalog
United Kingdom	1991	CD; CS	Virgin VIP	VVIPD 114
United States	1997	CD	Caroline	CAROL 1115-2
Europe	2006	CD	EMI Gold	355 9922
