= At Worst... The Best of Boy George and Culture Club =

Greatest hits album by Culture Club
- Released: 20 September 1993
- Recorded: 1982–1993
- Genre: New wave
- Label: Virgin; SBK (US)
- Producer: Steve Levine; Angela Dust; Bruce Forest; Amos Pizzey; Bobby Z. Pet Shop Boys; Arif Mardin; Lew Hahn; Jon Moss; P.M. Dawn; Andy Whitmore

Culture Club chronology
This Time – The First Four Years (1987)	At Worst... The Best of Boy George and Culture Club (1993)	Greatest Moments – VH1 Storytellers Live (1998)

Professional ratings
Review scores
Source	Rating
AllMusic	4.5/5 stars
NME	5/10

At Worst... The Best of Boy George and Culture Club is a greatest hits album featuring the biggest hits from 1982 to 1993 of Boy George's career as a solo singer as well as with the bands Culture Club and Jesus Loves You. It was released on 20 September 1993.

It was the third Culture Club retrospective following 1987's This Time – The First Four Years and 1989's The Best of Culture Club

While the album features most of Boy George's and Culture Club's hit singles up to that point, there were several notable omissions including "The War Song" (UK #2), "Mistake No.3", "The Medal Song" (UK #32) and "To Be Reborn" (UK #13).

== Track listing ==
Nº	Title	Performed	Album	Time
1	"Do You Really Want to Hurt Me"	Culture Club	Kissing to Be Clever	4:22
2	"Time (Clock of the Heart)"	Culture Club	Kissing to Be Clever	3:42
3	"Church of the Poison Mind"	Culture Club	Colour by Numbers	3:31
4	"Karma Chameleon"	Culture Club	Colour by Numbers	4:00
5	"Victims"	Culture Club	Colour by Numbers	4:53
6	"I'll Tumble 4 Ya"	Culture Club	Kissing to Be Clever	2:35
7	"It's a Miracle"	Culture Club	Colour by Numbers	3:25
8	"Miss Me Blind"	Culture Club	Colour by Numbers	4:29
9	"Move Away"	Culture Club	From Luxury to Heartache	4:20
10	"Love Is Love"	Culture Club	Electric Dreams soundtrack	3:50
11	"Love Hurts"	Jesus Loves You	The Martyr Mantras	4:25
12	"Everything I Own"	Boy George	Sold	3:56
13	"Don't Cry"	Boy George	High Hat	4:07
14	"After the Love"	Jesus Loves You	The Martyr Mantras	4:22
15	"More Than Likely"	P.M. Dawn (feat. Boy George)	The Bliss Album…?	3:50
16	"The Crying Game"	Boy George	The Crying Game	3:22
17	"Generations of Love" (La La Gone Gaga Mix)	Jesus Loves You	The Martyr Mantras	3:58
18	"Bow Down Mister" (A Small Portion 2B Polite Mix)	Jesus Loves You	The Martyr Mantras	3:44
19	"Sweet Toxic Love" (Deliverance Mix)	Jesus Loves You	Popularity Breeds Contempt (unreleased album)	3:52

== Charts ==
Weekly charts

Chart (1993)	Peak position
Australian Albums (ARIA)	185
UK Albums Chart	24
US Billboard 200	169

== Certifications ==
Region	Certification	Certified units/sales
United Kingdom (BPI)	Silver	60,000^{^}
^{^} Shipments figures based on certification alone.
