= The Best of Culture Club =

Compilation album by Culture Club
- Released: 1989
- Recorded: 1982–1985
- Genre: New wave, pop, rock, reggae, blue-eyed soul
- Label: Virgin
- Producer: Steve Levine

Culture Club chronology
This Time – The First Four Years (1987)	The Best of Culture Club (1989)	At Worst... The Best of Boy George and Culture Club (1993)

The Best of Culture Club is a greatest hits album of British new wave group Culture Club, released by Virgin Records in 1989.

== Overview ==
The album was Culture Club's second greatest hits compilation. It originally included 16 tracks: 13 singles, 2 songs previously not available on any Culture Club album, and a non-single track. Although it gathers many less successful singles, the compilation omits the major hit "Move Away", what makes From Luxury to Heartache not being represented by any song.

A mid-price version of the album was released in 1998 in Europe by Disky. In 1999 and 2004, Virgin and EMI Gold, respectively, released the album with different artworks, retaining the original track listing.

The compilation reached number 4 in French Compilations Chart in 1992. In 2005, the compilation was certified Silver in the UK by British Phonographic Industry.

== Track listing ==
1. "Do You Really Want to Hurt Me" — 4:25
2. "White Boy" — 4:40
3. "Church of the Poison Mind" — 3:32
4. "Changing Everyday" — 3:19
5. "The War Song" — 3:57
6. "I'm Afraid of Me" — 3:18
7. "It's a Miracle" — 3:25
8. "The Dream (From Electric Dreams)" — 2:29
9. "Time (Clock of the Heart)" — 3:43
10. "The Dive" — 3:48
11. "Victims" — 4:54
12. "I'll Tumble 4 Ya" — 2:35
13. "Miss Me Blind" — 4:31
14. "Mistake No.3" — 4:35
15. "The Medal Song" — 4:15
16. "Karma Chameleon" — 4:02

== Certifications ==
Region	Certification	Certified units/sales
United Kingdom (BPI)	Gold	100,000^{^}
^{^} Shipments figures based on certification alone.
