= Culture Club (box set) =

Box set by Culture Club
- Released: 2 December 2002
- Recorded: 1982–2002
- Genres: Pop; rock; new wave; reggae; soul; dance; acid house
- Label: Virgin

Culture Club chronology
Don't Mind If I Do (1999)	Culture Club (2002)	Greatest Hits (2005)

Professional ratings
Review scores
Source	Rating
AllMusic	3/5 stars
Q	3/5 stars
Rolling Stone	3/5 stars

Culture Club is a box set of music by English band Culture Club, comprising four CDs. It was released in 2002 on the Virgin label. Some of the songs included are also Boy George solo songs.

The box set represents a history of the band with an array of singles, album tracks, demos, remixes, alternative versions, and previously unreleased songs. The inner artwork includes a 72-page glossy booklet, official photos, quotes, and notes from band members. All previously unreleased tracks have been remastered for this release.

The track entitled "Shirley Temple Moment" is a spoken-word track presenting the making of UK #3 hit "Victims", along with a bitter argument between band members while rehearsing it. The fourth CD is totally dedicated to remix versions of both previously released and unreleased tracks, collectively called 'The Drumheads Sessions'.

== Track listing ==
Disc one
No.	Title	Produced by	Length
1.	"Put It Down" (Demo)	Culture Club	2:44
2.	"You Know I'm Not Crazy" (Demo)	Culture Club	3:20
3.	"Kissing 2 Be Clever" (Demo)	Culture Club	3:09
4.	"Stand Down" (Demo)	Culture Club	5:06
5.	"Next 2 You" (Demo)	Culture Club	4:02
6.	"Peculiar World" (Demo)	Culture Club	3:59
7.	"Believe" (Demo)	Culture Club	4:44
8.	"I'm Afraid Of Me" (Demo)	Steve Levine	3:20
9.	"White Boy" (Demo)	Levine	3:10
10.	"Do You Really Want 2 Hurt Me" (Demo)	Levine	3:50
11.	"Do You Really Want to Hurt Me"	Levine	4:23
12.	"Love Twist" (Featuring – Captain Crucial)	Levine	4:22
13.	"I'll Tumble 4 Ya"	Levine	2:36
14.	"Time (Clock of the Heart)"	Levine	3:44
15.	"Mister Man"	Levine	3:37
16.	"Church of the Poison Mind"	Levine	3:32
17.	"Karma Chameleon"	Levine	4:13
18.	"It's a Miracle"	Levine	3:26
19.	"Shirley Temple Moment"	Levine	5:49
20.	"Victims"	Levine	4:55

Disc two
No.	Title	Produced by	Length
1.	"Miss Me Blind"	Levine	4:32
2.	"Colour By Numbers"	Levine	3:56
3.	"Changing Everyday"	Levine	3:17
4.	"That's The Way (I'm Only Trying To Help You)"	Levine	2:46
5.	"Mistake Number 3"	Levine	4:35
6.	"Murder Rap Trap" (Featuring – Captain Crucial)	Levine	4:21
7.	"Man-Shake"	Levine	2:34
8.	"Bow Down Mister" (A Small Portion 2 B Polite Mix)	Bruce Forest	4:52
9.	"I Specialise In Loneliness" (Jimmy T & The Old Bastard Mix)	John Themis	3:14
10.	"If The Lord Can Forgive"	Boy George, Themis	4:42
11.	"Love Is Lonely"	Boy George, Themis	4:05
12.	"Sweet Toxic Love"	Themis	3:50
13.	"Moghul Tomb" (Demo)	Culture Club	3:25
14.	"Vanity Case" (Arabesque Mix)	Themis	3:38
15.	"Who Killed Rock N' Roll?"	Themis	3:15
16.	"Starman"	Themis	5:13
17.	"Suffragette City"	Themis	3:37
18.	"Mr Strange"	Boy George, Themis	3:50
19.	"Spooky Truth"	Themis	3:45
20.	"Funtime"	Jessica Corcoran	3:04
21.	"Satans Butterfly Ball" (4 Leigh Bowery) (With Intro)	Corcoran	2:59

Disc three
No.	Title	Produced by	Length
1.	"These Boots Are Made 4 Walking" (Nancy Headbanger Mix)	Boy George, Themis	2:48
2.	"Genocide Peroxid" (4 Maz)	Themis	3:38
3.	"Less Than Perfect"	Culture Club	6:34
4.	"Confidence Trick"	Culture Club	4:58
5.	"Sign Language"	Culture Club	4:02
6.	"How D'ya Keep Your Credibility?"	Themis	2:14
7.	"Is There Cream In This Soup?" (Demo)	Richie Stevens	4:22
8.	"Love Hurts" (Evolution Mix)	Bruce Forest	5:42
9.	"Same Thing In Reverse" (Evolution Mix)	Corcoran	3:54
10.	"See Thru" (MP3s Mix-Dedicated To The Late Chris McCoy-Nuff Love)	Culture Club	5:42
11.	"Strange Voodoo" (Jimmy T Prickly Heat Mix)	Culture Club	4:31
12.	"Do You Really Want 2 Hurt Me" (TMS~PMS Mix)	Levine	5:19
13.	"Masheri" (Demo)	Themis	3:58
14.	"Grand Scheme Of Things" (Demo)	Themis	4:25
15.	"Lions Roar" (Demo)	Themis	3:13
16.	"Victims 2002"	Kevan Frost	4:53
17.	"If I Were U" (Kinky Rolands 'Mind Over Substance Mix')	Themis	4:10
18.	"Church Of The Poison Mind" (Budgie Man Electro Mix)	Levine	4:46

Disc four, The Drumhead Sessions
No.	Title	Produced by	Length
1.	"Karma Chameleon" (Nail Out Of Coffin 'Rewind Mix' With Mr Spee 2002)	Levine	4:12
2.	"I Just Wanna Be Loved"	Stevens	4:23
3.	"Black Money" (Hint Of Helen Mix)	Levine	4:38
4.	"Everything I Own" (With Mr Spee)	Levine	4:12
5.	"Love Is Love 2002"	Boy George	3:50
6.	"Kipsy" (With MC Kinky)	Bobby Z.	6:03
7.	"Time (Clock Of The Heart)"	Levine	4:19
8.	"Hiroshima"	Stevens	5:33
9.	"Cold Shoulder" (Scary Newman Mix)	Paul Staveley O'Duffy	5:37
10.	"Police & Thieves" (Dubversive Mix)	Stevens	5:30
11.	"Do You Really Want 2 Hurt Me" (Drumheads Twisted Nerve Mix)	Levine	5:22
12.	"Maybe I'm A Fool"	O'Duffy	5:06
13.	"Crystal Blue Persuasion"	Roy Hay	4:31
14.	"Armageddon" (Demo)	Stevens	5:43
15.	"Run, Run, Run" (Demo)	Boy George, Stevens	3:43
