= Electric Dreams (soundtrack) =

1984 soundtrack album by various artists

Soundtrack album by Various artists
- Released: 20 July 1984; September 1998 (re-issue)
- Recorded: 1984
- Genre: Pop
- Length: 34:25 (edited); 50:28 (extended)
- Label: Virgin; Epic
- Producer: Giorgio Moroder; Jeff Lynne; Steve Levine; Don Was; B.E.F.; Greg Walsh

Electric Dreams is a soundtrack album from the film Electric Dreams, released in 1984.

== Overview ==
Several popular rock and new wave musicians of the 1980s contributed original music to the film's soundtrack. It was available throughout Europe but remained unreleased on compact disc in the U.S. until September 1998.

The song "Together in Electric Dreams" by Philip Oakey and Giorgio Moroder was released as a single and became an international hit in 1984. It was later featured on their album Philip Oakey & Giorgio Moroder (1985). Another song, "Video!" by Jeff Lynne, was also released as a single (with a non-album track, "Sooner or Later", as the B-side).

The soundtrack features two new recordings by Culture Club—"The Dream" and "Love Is Love"—as well as a song performed by Culture Club backing singer Helen Terry ("Now You're Mine") and a song written by fellow Culture Club members Boy George and Roy Hay (credited to O'Dowd/Pickett) ("Electric Dreams", performed by P. P. Arnold). All of these were released as singles (except "The Dream") with "Love Is Love" becoming a Top 3 in Canada and Top 10 in Japan in 1985.

Due to the international popularity of the film, Cantopop singer George Lam recorded a cover version of the song "The Duel", namely "A Life of Numbers" (Chinese: 數字人生), in his 1986 album "Passion" (Chinese: 最愛).

== Track listing ==
US CD, Cassette, LP release
No.	Title	Writer(s)	Performer	Length
1.	"Together in Electric Dreams"	Philip Oakey; Giorgio Moroder	Philip Oakey & Giorgio Moroder	3:52
2.	"Video!"	Jeff Lynne	Jeff Lynne	3:24
3.	"The Dream"	George O'Dowd; Mikey Craig; Roy Hay; Jon Moss	Culture Club	2:28
4.	"The Duel" (based upon the classical piece Minuet in G major)	Moroder	Giorgio Moroder	3:47
5.	"Now You're Mine"	Helen St. John; Rusty Lemorande	Helen Terry	4:05
6.	"Love Is Love"	O'Dowd; Craig; Hay; Moss	Culture Club	3:50
7.	"Chase Runner"	Ian Craig Marsh; Martyn Ware; Glenn Gregory	Heaven 17	3:00
8.	"Let it Run"	Lynne	Jeff Lynne	3:22
9.	"Madeline's Theme"	Moroder	Giorgio Moroder	2:17
10.	"Electric Dreams"	O'Dowd; Pickett; Roy Hay (uncredited)	P. P. Arnold	4:20
Total length:				34:25

Europe CD, Cassette, LP release (extended edition)
No.	Title	Writer(s)	Performer	Length
1.	"Electric Dreams"	George O'Dowd; Phil Pickett; Roy Hay (uncredited)	P. P. Arnold	6:50
2.	"Video!"	Jeff Lynne	Jeff Lynne	4:53
3.	"The Dream"	O'Dowd; Mikey Craig; Hay; Jon Moss	Culture Club	3:16
4.	"The Duel" (based upon the classical piece Minuet in G major)	Moroder	Giorgio Moroder	5:40
5.	"Now You're Mine"	Helen St. John; Rusty Lemorande	Helen Terry	5:20
6.	"Love Is Love"	O'Dowd; Craig; Hay; Moss	Culture Club	5:53
7.	"Chase Runner"	Ian Craig Marsh; Martyn Ware; Glenn Gregory	Heaven 17	4:53
8.	"Let it Run"	Lynne	Jeff Lynne	5:37
9.	"Madeline's Theme"	Moroder	Giorgio Moroder	2:48
10.	"Together in Electric Dreams"	Philip Oakey; Moroder	Philip Oakey & Giorgio Moroder	5:18
Total length:				50:28

Europe CD, Cassette, LP release (edited edition)
No.	Title	Writer(s)	Performer	Length
1.	"Electric Dreams"	George O'Dowd; Phil Pickett; Roy Hay (uncredited)	P. P. Arnold	4:20
2.	"Video!"	Jeff Lynne	Jeff Lynne	3:24
3.	"The Dream"	O'Dowd; Mikey Craig; Hay; Jon Moss	Culture Club	2:28
4.	"The Duel" (based upon the classical piece Minuet in G major)	Moroder	Giorgio Moroder	3:47
5.	"Now You're Mine"	Helen St. John; Rusty Lemorande	Helen Terry	4:05
6.	"Love Is Love"	O'Dowd; Craig; Hay; Moss	Culture Club	3:50
7.	"Chase Runner"	Ian Craig Marsh; Martyn Ware; Glenn Gregory	Heaven 17	3:00
8.	"Let it Run"	Lynne	Jeff Lynne	3:22
9.	"Madeline's Theme"	Moroder	Giorgio Moroder	2:17
10.	"Together in Electric Dreams"	Philip Oakey; Moroder	Philip Oakey & Giorgio Moroder	3:52
Total length:				34:25

== Personnel ==
Adapted from the album's liner notes.

- B.E.F. & Greg Walsh – producer ("Chase Runner")
- Steve Levine – producer ("The Dream", "Love Is Love")
- Jeff Lynne – producer ("Video!", "Let It Run")
- Giorgio Moroder – producer ("The Duel", "Now You're Mine", "Madeline's Theme", "Together in Electric Dreams")
- Don Was – producer ("Electric Dreams")
- Richard Tandy – assistant to Jeff Lynne

== Charts ==
Chart performance for Electric Dreams
Chart (1984–85)	Peak position
Australia (Kent Music Report)	54
