= Life (Boy George and Culture Club album) =

Studio album by Boy George and Culture Club
- Released: 26 October 2018
- Genres: Indie rock; reggae; soul
- Length: 43:12
- Label: BMG
- Producers: Future Cut; John Themis

Culture Club chronology
Greatest Hits (2005)	Life (2018)

Boy George chronology
This Is What I Do (2013)	Life (2018)	Cool Karaoke (2021)

Singles from Life
- 1. "Let Somebody Love You" Released: 31 July 2018; 2. "Life" Released: 18 December 2018; 3. "Runaway Train" Released: 13 April 2019 (limited edition)

Life is the sixth studio album by British band Culture Club, credited to "Boy George and Culture Club". It was released on 26 October 2018 through BMG. It was Culture Club's first studio album since 1999's Don't Mind If I Do.

== Background and composition ==
After the band reformed in 2014, the album originally began as Tribes, a project that the band offered through PledgeMusic that was initially set to be released in 2015, then early 2016 through the band's own label, Different Man Music. Tribes was recorded in Spain, with a documentary titled From Karma to Calamity filmed and aired on BBC Four, and a tour planned that was later cancelled. The album itself was later shelved, with all those who pre-ordered the album refunded.

In July 2018, it was announced that the album had been reworked as Life, and was to be released on 26 October 2018.

George stated about Tribes and Life:

"We started it four years ago, we were recording in Spain, and we had a really great time doing it. I'm kind of really glad that we did it this year because everyone was in such a much better place. The songs were better, the communication was better. We're really happy that we did it now and not then. I even allowed people to have opinions on this album, which is shocking!

"I mean, my job is lyrics and melodies — I sort of provide the story — so I've always been quite protective and a bit precious about that, but on this particular record I was very open to 'what do you think about this?' and trying things, which is quite different. If you don't know me, you'd be alarmed really."

George also stated that he had been working on material for years and wanted to put out more than one album over the ensuing time period, and that while he "really enjoy[s] the creative process", "trying to sell them is not so great".

== Singles ==
Prior to the album, the song "Let Somebody Love You" was released as a digital single and video.

The title track was released as lead single, followed by a limited edition issue of "Runaway Train" which was re-recorded as a duet with Gladys Knight and released for Record Store Day 2019.

== Critical reception ==
Professional ratings
Review scores
Source	Rating
AllMusic	4/5 stars
Gaffa	4/6 stars
The Independent	3/5 stars
Metro	4/5 stars
The Times	3/5 stars

An AllMusic review, written by Stephen Thomas Erlewine, gives the album 4 out of 5 stars, with the author stating, "Everything on Life seems considered and light, whether it's adopting relatively recent production flair or the many allusions to the past. Some styles may be retro — there's some disco, Northern soul and Motown, reggae and arena rock — but the sensibility is modern, particularly in how certain contradictory sounds are woven together." Furthermore, Erlewine states that Boy George's voice "gives this often slick music a real human dimension, and helps the album live up to its title: this is the music of a life, maintaining memory, focused on the future while living in the present."

Writing for The Independent, Clarisse Loughrey said that the album "now arrives as a kind of belated apology. Thankfully, Culture Club's musical journey of late has been detached enough from the contemporary music scene that the album's content doesn't feel as if it's missed the mark, or its time. In that sense, it's a satisfying delivery for fans, though it may achieve little else." Loughrey stated that "There are club scene tones present in the baseline to "God & Love" and "Resting Bitch Face", a calypso-inspired approach in "Human Zoo" (although it feels inauthentic), but Life is otherwise largely dominated by reggae and soul."

Will Hodgkinson of The Times said that "Now the band's name has had Boy George's stuck in front of it, [it] demeans the whole thing somewhat", but called the album "pretty solid. "God & Love" showcases George's now deeper, still remarkable voice against tribal rock, "Let Somebody Love You" goes back to Culture Club's trademark light-hearted reggae, and the stomping soul and soaring strings of "Runaway Train" and "Life" evoke power and passion". Hodgkinson continued that "Maybe the world doesn't need a song called "Resting Bitch Face" or indeed an entire album that makes a grab for Culture Club's Eighties glory", but still rated the album three stars out of five.

== Track listing ==
No.	Title	Writer(s)	Length
1.	"God & Love"	George O'Dowd, Roy Hay, Michael Craig, John Themis	4:13
2.	"Bad Blood"	O'Dowd, Hay, Craig, Themis	3:25
3.	"Human Zoo"	O'Dowd, Hay, Craig, Jonathan Moss	3:21
4.	"Let Somebody Love You"	O'Dowd, Hay, Craig, Moss, Richard Stevens	3:45
5.	"What Does Sorry Mean?"	O'Dowd, Hay, Craig, Themis	4:23
6.	"Runaway Train"	O'Dowd, Hay, Craig, Moss, Martin Glover	3:31
7.	"Resting Bitch Face"	O'Dowd, Hay, Craig, Themis, Moss	3:40
8.	"Different Man"	O'Dowd, Hay, Craig, Moss	3:33
9.	"Oil & Water"	O'Dowd, Hay, Craig, Themis, Glover	4:37
10.	"More Than Silence"	O'Dowd, Hay, Craig, Glover, Moss	4:26
11.	"Life"	O'Dowd, Hay, Craig, Iyiola Babalola, Darren Lewis, Phillip Sewell	4:18
Total length:			43:12

== Personnel ==
Adapted from AllMusic.

Culture Club

- Boy George – vocals, backing vocals
- Michael Craig – bass guitar, rhythm guitar, keyboards, string arrangements, backing vocals
- Roy Hay – brass arrangement, guitar, keyboards, orchestral arrangements, string arrangements, backing vocals
- Jon Moss – drums, backing vocals

with:

- Iyiola Babalola – drums, percussion, programming, synthesizer
- Dick Beetham – mastering
- Reuben Fowler – brass arrangement, flugelhorn, trumpet
- Future Cut – engineer, producer
- James Gardiner-Bateman – clarinet, flute, saxophone
- Derek Green – backing vocals
- House Gospel Choir – choir/chorus
- Darren Lewis – drums, percussion, programming, synthesizer
- London Chamber Orchestra – strings
- Jeremy Murphy – engineer
- Chris Parker – engineer
- Dan Parry – mixing
- Mary Pearce – backing vocals
- John Themis – guitar, producer, string arrangements, backing vocals
- Daniel Thomas – choir master
- Nichol Thomson – trombone
- Will Vaughan – assistant, programming
- Tom Walsh – flugelhorn, trumpet
- Peter Whitfield – conductor, string arrangements
- Youth (Martin Glover) – co-producer, programming

== Charts ==
Chart (2018)	Peak position
Australian Digital Albums (ARIA)	25
Belgian Albums (Ultratop Wallonia)	151
German Albums (Offizielle Top 100)	58
Italian Albums (FIMI)	66
Scottish Albums (Official Charts)	11
Swiss Albums (Schweizer Hitparade)	89
UK Albums (Official Charts)	12
