= Collect (disambiguation) =

The collect is a short general prayer in Christian liturgy.

Collect may also refer to:

- Collecting, a hobby focused on acquiring items

== See also ==
- Collect call, a telephone call paid for by the person called
- Collect Pond, New York, United States
- Collect – 12" Mixes Plus, 1991 compilation album by British band Culture Club
- Collected (disambiguation)
- Collection (disambiguation)
- Collector (disambiguation)
