= Helen St. John =

American singer-songwriter

Helen St. John is a singer-songwriter, pianist, lyricist and recording artist.

St. John's fame came as a result of her piano performances on the soundtrack of the motion picture Flashdance. "Love Theme from Flashdance" earned two Grammy nominations: Best Pop Instrumental Performance and Album of the Year.

The 2008 CD Moment By Moment is her first release as a singer-songwriter. She has produced a CD of modern spiritually-inspired songs driven by world beats and pop drums.

St. John was involved in the making of the soundtracks for Scarface, Superman III and Electric Dreams and two of her solo albums, Power to the Piano and Take Your Passion, were produced by Giorgio Moroder.

== Discography ==
Soundtrack albums:

- Flashdance
- Scarface
- Superman III
- Electric Dreams

Solo albums:

- Moment by Moment (2008)
- Power to the Piano
- Take Your Passion
