= Colour by Numbers =

Studio album by Culture Club
- Released: 10 October 1983 (UK)
- Recorded: 1983
- Studio: Red Bus Studios and CBS Studios, London
- Genre: New wave; blue-eyed soul
- Length: 38:14; 57:50 (2003 remaster)
- Label: Virgin (UK); Epic (US)
- Producer: Steve Levine

Culture Club chronology
Kissing to Be Clever (1982)	Colour by Numbers (1983)	Waking Up with the House on Fire (1984)

Singles from Colour by Numbers
- 1. "Church of the Poison Mind" Released: 1 April 1983; 2. "Karma Chameleon" Released: 5 September 1983; 3. "Victims" Released: 28 November 1983; 4. "Miss Me Blind" Released: 14 February 1984 (US); 5. "It's a Miracle" Released: 12 March 1984

Colour by Numbers is the second album by the British pop band Culture Club. It was released in the UK on 10 October 1983, with the US release following on 13 October 1983. Preceded by the hit single "Karma Chameleon", which reached number one in several countries, the album reached number one in the UK and has sold 10 million copies. It has been certified triple platinum in the UK and quadruple platinum in the US. It was ranked number 96 on Rolling Stone magazine's list of the 100 Best Albums of the 1980s.

== Overview ==
Colour by Numbers has sold more than 10 million copies worldwide, and like its predecessor, Kissing to Be Clever, contains several hit singles. In the United States, all the album tracks peaked at number three on the US Dance Club Songs chart. "Karma Chameleon" was the signature track from the album and when released as single reached number one in many countries. "Church of the Poison Mind" reached number two in the UK, and went top 10 in the US, Canada, Australia and many European countries. "Miss Me Blind" was released in North America, South America, Japan, and Australia to great success (top five in the US and Canada), "It's A Miracle" became a top 10 or top 20 hit in several markets. "Victims" was released in Europe and Oceania, it was also a top five hit in the UK and Australia, but was not released as a single in the US. "Mister Man" was also released as a single in South Africa.

The album was certified triple Platinum in the UK, Diamond in Canada, and 4× Platinum in the United States where it peaked at number two for six consecutive weeks behind Michael Jackson's Thriller. In an interview in 1998, the four members of Culture Club agreed that Colour by Numbers was their best work. It was remastered in 2002 and 2003, for the Culture Club box set and for a re-release of the album. In 2005, the album was also released in Japan in a cardboard sleeve, similar to the original vinyl artwork, also featuring the remastered tracks and five bonus songs that were on the 2003 version. In 2014, Boy George curated a live performance of Colour by Numbers in Manchester in collaboration with the BBC Philharmonic Orchestra. Songs were performed by Boy George and guest artists Jimmy Somerville, Eve Gallagher, John Grant, Zee Asha, Hollie Cooke and the Melodico Ensemble.

== Writing and recording ==
Recording the album, Culture Club used the same producer, Steve Levine, and the same studio (Red Bus, London) as on their debut album but this time worked with several session musicians, most notably keyboardist Phil Pickett, who also co-wrote two songs, and backing vocalist Helen Terry. The songs took influence from earlier pop history; the melody of "It's a Miracle" was inspired by Gilbert O'Sullivan's "Matrimony" and "Church of the Poison Mind" by Stevie Wonder's "Uptight".

== Reception ==
Professional ratings
Review scores
Source	Rating
AllMusic	4.5/5 stars
The Baltimore Sun	4/5 stars
Number One	5/5
Record Mirror	5/5 stars
Rolling Stone	4/5 stars
The Rolling Stone Album Guide	3/5 stars
Slant Magazine	4/5 stars
Smash Hits	10/10
Spin Alternative Record Guide	8/10
The Village Voice	B+

Reviews for Colour by Numbers have been generally positive. Smash Hits reviewer Peter Martin called it "simply one of the most enjoyable records I've ever heard". Stephen Holden of Rolling Stone said that the album "secures lead singer Boy George's place as a blue-eyed soul balladeer in the first rank". Holden found that it "is by no means a weighty album", but nonetheless "has gobs of emotion plastered as thickly as Boy George's makeup, and ten tunes that stick", and concluded: "Whether you like the band or not, Culture Club is one pop group that matters." Robert Christgau of The Village Voice wrote that "George's warm, well-meaning, slightly clumsy croon signifies most effectively when it has the least to say – when it's most purely a medium for his warm, well-meaning, slightly clumsy self", and that "his real aim in life is to reenact the story of the ugly duckling – and to radiate the kind of extreme tolerance that's so often engendered by extreme sexual ambiguity." Colour by Numbers was ranked at number seven among the "Albums of the Year" for 1983 by NME.

In a retrospective review, AllMusic's Jose F. Promis wrote: "The songs were infectious, the videos were all over MTV, and the band was a media magnet." He deemed the album "flamboyant, fun, sexy, soulful, colorful, androgynous, and carefree" like other 1980s music, and concluded by calling it "the artistic and commercial pinnacle of a band that still attracted new fans years later." Scott Shetler of Slant Magazine stated that "Culture Club hit their stride, and the influence of its 10 colorful songs can still be felt today." He said that "its greatness can be measured by the fact that its album tracks are just as good as its singles", and that "in the end, Colour by Numbers is an album that needs no tinkering." Slant Magazine also included it on their 2003 list of 50 Essential Pop Albums. In 1989, Colour by Numbers was ranked at number 96 on Rolling Stone's list of the 100 best albums of the 1980s. The album was included in the book 1001 Albums You Must Hear Before You Die.

== Track listing ==
All tracks are written by Culture Club (George Alan O'Dowd, Mikey Craig, Roy Hay, and Jon Moss), except where noted.

Side one
No.	Title	Writer(s)	Length
1.	"Karma Chameleon"	O'Dowd; Moss; Craig; Hay; Pickett	4:11
2.	"It's a Miracle"	O'Dowd; Moss; Craig; Hay; Pickett	3:25
3.	"Black Money"		5:19
4.	"Changing Every Day"		3:17
5.	"That's the Way (I'm Only Trying to Help You)"		2:45

Side two
No.	Title	Length
6.	"Church of the Poison Mind"	3:30
7.	"Miss Me Blind"	4:30
8.	"Mister Man"	3:36
9.	"Stormkeeper"	2:46
10.	"Victims"	4:55
Total length:		38:14

2003 reissue bonus tracks
No.	Title	Writer(s)	Length
11.	"Man-Shake"		2:34
12.	"Mystery Boy" (Suntory Hot Whiskey Song)	O'Dowd; Moss; Craig; Hay; Pickett	3:33
13.	"Melting Pot" (live)	Steve Cook	4:31
14.	"Colour by Numbers"		3:57
15.	"Romance Revisited"		5:00
Total length:			57:50

"Time (Clock of the Heart)" was included in Japanese vinyl pressings.

== Personnel ==
Culture Club

- Boy George – lead and backing vocals
- Roy Hay – guitars, piano, electric sitar, backing vocals
- Mike Craig – bass guitar, backing vocals
- Jon Moss – drums, backing vocals

Additional musicians

- Judd Lander – harmonica
- Phil Pickett – Hammond organ, synthesizers
- Steve Grainger – saxophone
- Patrick Seymour – flute
- Graham Broad – percussion
- Jermaine Stewart – backing vocals
- Terry Bailey – trumpet
- Helen Terry – backing vocals

== Charts ==
=== Weekly charts ===
Chart (1983–1984)	Position
Australian Kent Music Report Albums Chart	1
Austrian Albums Chart	17
Canadian RPM Albums Chart	1
Dutch Mega Albums Chart	3
Finnish Albums Chart	11
French SNEP Albums Chart	4
Japanese Oricon LPs Chart	1
New Zealand Albums Chart	1
Norwegian VG-lista Albums Chart	2
Spanish Albums Chart	2
Swedish Albums Chart	3
Swiss Albums Chart	4
UK Albums Chart	1
US Billboard 200	2
West German Media Control Albums Chart	6

=== Year-end charts ===
Chart (1983)	Position
Australian Albums Chart	25
Canadian Albums Chart	65
Dutch Albums Chart	22
French Albums Chart	12
New Zealand Albums (RMNZ)	37
UK Albums Chart	3
Chart (1984)	Position
Australian Albums Chart	3
Canadian Albums Chart	7
Dutch Albums Chart	83
Japanese Albums Chart (Oricon)	14
New Zealand Albums (RMNZ)	8
UK Albums Chart	35
US Billboard 200	5

=== Decade-end charts ===
Chart (1980–89)	Position
Australian Albums Chart	16

== Certifications ==
Region	Certification	Certified units/sales
Canada (Music Canada)	Diamond	1,000,000^{^}
France (SNEP)	Gold	100,000^{*}
Hong Kong (IFPI Hong Kong)	Platinum	20,000^{*}
Japan (Oricon Charts)	—	481,790
Netherlands (NVPI)	Platinum	100,000^{^}
New Zealand (RMNZ)	Platinum	15,000^{^}
Spain (Promusicae)	Gold	50,000^{^}
United Kingdom (BPI)	3× Platinum	900,000^{^}
United States (RIAA)	4× Platinum	4,000,000^{^}
Summaries
Worldwide	—	10,000,000
^{*} Sales figures based on certification alone.^{^} Shipments figures based on certification alone.

== Release details ==
Country	Date	Label	Format	Catalog
	1983	Virgin	CD	91391-2
			LP	39170
	1990		CD	V2-86180
	2003		CD	92408
