= The War Song =

1984 single by Culture Club

Single by Culture Club

from the album Waking Up with the House on Fire
- B-side: "La cancion de guerra"
- Released: 24 September 1984
- Genre: New pop
- Length: 4:14
- Label: Virgin; Epic
- Songwriters: Boy George; Roy Hay; Mikey Craig; Jon Moss
- Producer: Steve Levine

Culture Club singles chronology
"It's a Miracle" (1984)	"The War Song" (1984)	"The Medal Song" (1984)

"The War Song" is a song by British band Culture Club, featuring background vocals from Clare Torry. It was released as the lead single from the band's third album, Waking Up with the House on Fire (1984), in September 1984. The song became the group's seventh top-five hit on the UK Singles Chart. In the United States, the single peaked at number 17 on the Billboard Hot 100. Elsewhere, it reached the top 10 in several countries, including Australia, Canada, and Ireland, peaking at number one in the latter country.

Lead singer Boy George later stated on BBC3 that "most people are very ignorant politically and we're all told how glamorous war is." The band mostly played the song live during the 1980s. The group played the song at a gig on New Year's Eve 2011. They also performed the song in 2014.

== Critical reception ==
Cash Box said that "this strong anti-war statement is delivered with simple but effective words and a varied melody." Billboard called it "an effervescent protest song, hard to disagree with."

== Track listings ==
Depending on region, Spanish B-side "La cancion de guerra" is replaced with another alternate-language version, including French version "La chanson de guerre", German version "Der Kriegsgesang", and Japanese version "Sensō no uta" ("戦争のうた").

7-inch single

A. "The War Song" – 3:57
B. "La cancion de guerra" – 4:06

12-inch single

A1. "The War Song" (ultimate dance mix) – 6:51
B1. "The War Song" (Shriek mix) – 6:16
B2. "La cancion de guerra"

== Chart ==
=== Weekly charts ===
Chart (1984–1985)	Peak position
Australia (Kent Music Report)	2
Belgium (Ultratop 50 Flanders)	4
Canada Top Singles (RPM)	7
El Salvador (UPI)	3
Europe (European Hot 100 Singles)	3
France (SNEP)	7
Ireland (IRMA)	1
Netherlands (Dutch Top 40)	5
Netherlands (Single Top 100)	7
New Zealand (Recorded Music NZ)	5
Norway (VG-lista)	5
Spain (AFYVE)	4
Sweden (Sverigetopplistan)	6
Switzerland (Schweizer Hitparade)	10
UK Singles (Official Charts)	2
US Billboard Hot 100	17
US Dance Club Songs (Billboard)	7
Venezuela (UPI)	8
West Germany (GfK)	12

=== Year-end charts ===
Chart (1984)	Position
Australia (Kent Music Report)	51
Belgium (Ultratop)	35
Canada Top Singles (RPM)	67
Netherlands (Dutch Top 40)	31
Netherlands (Single Top 100)	30
UK Singles (OCC)	31

== Certifications ==
Region	Certification	Certified units/sales
Canada (Music Canada)	Gold	50,000^{^}
United Kingdom (BPI)	Silver	250,000^{^}
^{^} Shipments figures based on certification alone.

== See also ==
- List of anti-war songs
