= Kissing to Be Clever =

- Standard cover art

Studio album by Culture Club
- Released: 8 October 1982 (UK); 13 December 1982 (US)
- Recorded: 1982
- Studios: Red Bus Studios, London
- Genres: New wave; blue-eyed soul
- Length: 33:35
- Labels: Virgin (UK); Epic (US)
- Producer: Steve Levine

Culture Club chronology
Kissing to Be Clever (1982)	Colour by Numbers (1983)

Singles from Kissing to Be Clever
- 1. "White Boy" Released: 30 April 1982 (UK); 2. "I'm Afraid of Me" Released: 25 June 1982 (UK); 3. "Do You Really Want to Hurt Me" Released: 6 September 1982 (UK) November 1982 (US); 4. "Time (Clock of the Heart)" Released: 19 November 1982 (UK) 29 March 1983 (US); 5. "I'll Tumble 4 Ya" Released: June 1983 (US)

Kissing to Be Clever is the debut album by the English band Culture Club, released on 8 October 1982 in the United Kingdom. It includes Culture Club's international breakthrough hit single, "Do You Really Want to Hurt Me", which reached number one in the band's native UK and the top 10 of many charts around the world. The album has sold approximately 5 million copies worldwide, including over 1 million in the US, where it has been certified Platinum by the RIAA.

== Overview ==
The album's first two singles were "White Boy" (which failed to crack the US or UK charts) and "I'm Afraid of Me" (which peaked at No. 100 in the UK). But with the release of "Do You Really Want to Hurt Me", the band scored a number one hit in over a dozen countries, and the song also hit the top 10 in several other countries, including number two in the U.S. The album itself spent 88 weeks on the US Billboard chart, reaching its peak position of number 14 in March 1983 in the US. The follow-up single, "Time (Clock of the Heart)", became a US number two and UK top three hit. This song appeared on the US version of the album but not initially on the UK version. Another single was released in North America, "I'll Tumble 4 Ya", which became the group's third consecutive top 10 single in the US. This gave Culture Club the distinction of being the first band since The Beatles to have three top 10 hits from a debut album in the US.

Kissing to Be Clever was remastered and re-released in 2003 on CD. This edition contains the song "Romance Beyond the Alphabet", which is the orchestral instrumental version of "Time (Clock of the Heart), also included on Culture Club Collect – 12" Mixes Plus and its subsequent re-release Culture Club Remix Collection as "Time (Clock of the Heart) (Instrumental Mix)". The 2003 release of the album has the restoration of the original colour cover, which had been replaced by a black-and-white picture of lead singer Boy George on previous versions.

== Reception ==
Professional ratings
Review scores
Source	Rating
AllMusic	4/5 stars
Rolling Stone	4/5 stars
The Rolling Stone Album Guide	3/5 stars
Smash Hits	9/10
The Village Voice	B

Reviews for Kissing to Be Clever have been generally positive. AllMusic's Lindsay Planer noted that it "was embraced by not only post-disco dance music enthusiasts, but also new wave listeners and pop fans as well." He also stated that the singles "provide accurate thumbnail sketches of what Culture Club were capable of pulling off musically." He concluded by saying: "From the light and buoyant Philly soul-inspired string arrangement to the effervescent and singalongable chorus, the melody foreshadowed a similar vibe that would carry over to their sophomore long-player, Colour by Numbers."

Contemporary reviews were generally favourable. Smash Hits' Beverly Hillier gave the album a 9 out of 10 rating, calling it "a first class record". Hillier found the songs "well crafted and the musicianship is excellent throughout" and pointed out Boy George's voice as "the band's strongest asset." "Disco, salsa, reggae and Caribbean rhythms are all used but with such obvious love and respect for their roots that nobody can accuse them of plagiarism. On this showing Culture Club will easily outlive the fashionable wave they're riding on at the moment."

Robert Christgau of The Village Voice wrote that "for all [Culture Club's] fashionability I think their hearts are in the right place". However, he stated that "their bland Caribbean rhythms move no muscles, and their confrontations with racial issues are rarely more than a phrase deep." Lloyd Sachs of Rolling Stone stated that the album "positively jumps, from the pleasure-seeking masochism of 'Do You Really Want to Hurt Me?' to the fearful soul-searching of 'I'm Afraid of Me' to the shady 'I'll Tumble 4 Ya'". He further stated that "[Boy George's] vocal 'normalcy' [plays] against the provocative content of the material." He concluded that "the beat does special service to the message – even when we don't quite know what that message is."

== Track listing ==
All tracks are written by Culture Club.

Side one
No.	Title	Length
1.	"White Boy" (Dance Mix)	4:40
2.	"You Know I'm Not Crazy"	3:36
3.	"I'll Tumble 4 Ya"	2:36
4.	"Take Control"	3:09
5.	"Love Twist" (Featuring Captain Crucial)	4:23

Side two
No.	Title	Length
6.	"Boy Boy (I'm the Boy)"	3:50
7.	"I'm Afraid of Me" (Remix)	3:16
8.	"White Boys Can't Control It"	3:43
9.	"Do You Really Want to Hurt Me"	4:22
Total length:		33:35

1982 Spanish Edition

Side one
No.	Title	Length
1.	"White Boy" (Dance Mix)	4:40
2.	"You Know I'm Not Crazy"	3:36
3.	"I'll Tumble 4 Ya"	2:36
4.	"Take Control"	3:09
5.	"Love Twist" (Featuring Captain Crucial)	4:23

Side two
No.	Title	Length
6.	Mystery Boy (Suntory Hot Whisky Song)	
7.	"Boy Boy (I'm the Boy)"	3:50
8.	"I'm Afraid of Me" (Remix)	3:16
9.	"White Boys Can't Control It"	3:43
10.	"Do You Really Want to Hurt Me"	4:22

2003 reissue bonus tracks
No.	Title	Length
10.	"Love Is Cold (You Were Never No Good)"	4:24
11.	"Murder Rap Trap"	4:23
12.	"Time (Clock of the Heart)"	3:45
13.	"Romance Beyond the Alphabet"	3:49

=== "Time (Clock of the Heart)" ===
"Time (Clock of the Heart)" appears as the lead track on side two on the reissued North American version of Kissing to Be Clever, which was reissued shortly after the single's release in March 1983. In Europe and other regions, it does not appear on the album, but instead was released as a stand-alone single on 19 November 1982. The Epic Records cassette version also included "Do You Really Want To Hurt Me" (Dub Version, featuring Pappa Weasel) and "Romance Beyond the Alphabet" ("Time" Instrumental). The track listing is as follows:

Side one
No.	Title	Length
1.	"Do You Really Want To Hurt Me"	4:22
2.	"I'm Afraid Of Me" (Remix)	3:17
3.	"You Know I'm Not Crazy"	3:36
4.	"I'll Tumble 4 Ya"	2:36
5.	"Love Twist" (Featuring Captain Crucial)	4:23
6.	"Do You Really Want To Hurt Me" (Dub Version) (Featuring Pappa Weasel)	3:38

Side two
No.	Title	Length
7.	"Time (Clock Of The Heart)"	3:42
8.	"White Boy" (Dance Mix)	4:40
9.	"Boy, Boy (I'm The Boy)"	3:46
10.	"White Boys Can't Control It"	3:42
11.	"Take Control"	3:10
12.	"Romance Beyond the Alphabet" ("Time" Instrumental)	3:46
Total length:		44:41

== Personnel ==
=== Culture Club ===
- Boy George – vocals
- Michael Craig – bass
- Roy Hay – guitar, piano, keyboards, sitar, electric sitar
- Jon Moss – percussion, drums

=== Additional musicians ===
- Keith Miller – Synclavier
- Terry Bailey – trumpet
- Colin Campsie – background vocals
- Nicky Payne – flute, harmonica, saxophone
- Denise Spooner – background vocals
- Helen Terry – backing vocals
- Phil Pickett – keyboards, background vocals
- Trevor Bastow – strings arrangement

=== Production ===
- Steve Levine – producer, engineer
- Gordon Milne – assistant engineer, mixing
- Jon Moss – mixing, Linn LM-1 drum programming
- Keith Miller – Synclavier programming
- Jik Graham – cover design, logo, typography
- Andy Phillips – photography
- Mark Lebon – photography
- Jackie Ball – artwork
- Nick Egan – logo

== Charts ==
=== Weekly charts ===
Chart (1982–1983)	Peak position
Australian Albums (Kent Music Report)	12
Austrian Albums (Ö3 Austria)	6
Canada Top Albums/CDs (RPM)	2
Dutch Albums (Album Top 100)	10
Finnish Albums (Suomen virallinen lista)	19
German Albums (Offizielle Top 100)	8
Japanese Albums (Oricon)	7
New Zealand Albums (RMNZ)	2
Norwegian Albums (VG-lista)	3
Swedish Albums (Sverigetopplistan)	3
UK Albums (Official Charts)	5
US Billboard 200	14
US Top R&B/Hip-Hop Albums (Billboard)	24

=== Year-end charts ===
Chart (1982)	Position
Dutch Albums (Album Top 100)	86

Chart (1983)	Position
Canada Top Albums/CDs (RPM)	21
German Albums (Offizielle Top 100)	40
US Billboard 200	9
US Top R&B/Hip-Hop Albums (Billboard)	31

=== Singles ===
Single	Chart (1982–1983)	Peak position
"Do You Really Want to Hurt Me"	UK Singles Chart	1
"Do You Really Want to Hurt Me"	U.S. Billboard Hot 100	2
"Do You Really Want to Hurt Me"	U.S. R&B Singles	39
"Do You Really Want to Hurt Me"	U.S. Adult Contemporary	8
"Time (Clock of the Heart)"	UK Singles Chart	3
"Time (Clock of the Heart)"	U.S. Billboard Hot 100	2
"I'll Tumble 4 Ya"	U.S. Adult Contemporary	33
"I'll Tumble 4 Ya"	U.S. Hot Dance Club Play	14
"I'll Tumble 4 Ya"	U.S. Billboard Hot 100	9
"I'm Afraid of Me" / "Do You Really Want to Hurt Me"	U.S. Hot Dance Club Play	34

== Certifications and sales ==
Region	Certification	Certified units/sales
Canada (Music Canada)	3× Platinum	300,000^{^}
Denmark (IFPI Danmark)	Gold	50,000^{^}
New Zealand (RMNZ)	Gold	7,500^{^}
Sweden (GLF)	Gold	50,000^{^}
United Kingdom (BPI)	Platinum	300,000^{^}
United States (RIAA)	Platinum	1,000,000^{^}
Summaries
Worldwide	—	4,000,000
^{^} Shipments figures based on certification alone.

== Release details ==
Country	Date	Label	Format	Catalog
UK	1982	Virgin	LP	V2232
UK	1983	Virgin	CD	91390
USA	1982	Epic/Virgin	LP	FE 38398
USA	1990	Epic/Virgin	CD	V2-86179
USA	2003	Epic/Virgin	CD	92404
