= Helen Terry =

British singer and television producer (born 1956)

- Born: 25 May 1956 (age 70)
- Genres: Pop; rock
- Instrument: Vocals
- Years active: 1982–present
- Labels: Virgin; Parlophone
- Formerly of: Culture Club

Helen Terry (born 25 May 1956) is a British singer and television producer, known for her backing vocal work with Culture Club. As a solo performer, she scored a Top 40 hit single in 1984 with "Love Lies Lost", and released one album in 1986, Blue Notes.

Terry changed careers, with a focus in film and television production, and moved behind the scenes in the music industry. She has been a producer and executive producer for the TV broadcast of the BRIT Awards since 2001.

== Recording career ==
Terry was asked to perform on Culture Club's debut album, Kissing to Be Clever, after lead singer Boy George met her at a London club. Her soulful vocals became a key element of the Culture Club sound on the group's debut album and its follow-up, Colour by Numbers. She is featured in several of the band's videos, including "Time (Clock of the Heart)", "Church of the Poison Mind", "It's a Miracle", "Black Money", "That's the Way", "Victims", and often appeared on television with them.

Her solo career began in 1984 on Culture Club's label Virgin with the single "Love Lies Lost" (which she wrote in collaboration with group members Boy George and Roy Hay). The single went to No. 34 in the UK, reached the same position in Australia, and was a No. 28 hit in Ireland. That year, she also co-wrote and recorded "Now You're Mine" with producer Giorgio Moroder for the soundtrack to the film, Electric Dreams, and released the single "Stuttering".

In 1985, she recorded "Take That Look Off Your Face" for the multi-artist tribute album Performance - The Very Best Of Tim Rice & Andrew Lloyd Webber. She also guested on backing vocals on the track "Take Me Home" on Phil Collins' No Jacket Required.

Terry's album Blue Notes was released in 1986, and was produced by Don Was with contributions from Stewart Levine and Christopher Neil. It spawned three singles, "Stuttering", "Act Of Mercy" and "Come On And Find Me".

Also in 1986, she recorded "One Sunny Day/Duelling Bikes" with Ray Parker Jr. for the 1986 Kevin Bacon movie Quicksilver; it reached #96 on the US Billboard Hot 100.

Her involvement with Culture Club was minimal after 1985, although she made a guest appearance during Boy George's 1987 UK solo tour and would appear on background vocals on various Boy George projects up until 1990's The Martyr Mantras. Terry and Boy George had a falling out after he wrote about their relationship in his memoir, but have reconciled.

In 1989, after signing to Parlophone, she released an EP, Fortunate Fool, featuring three new songs. Two of these, "Fortunate Fool" and "Lessons in Loneliness", were also released as singles, but differences with her record company led to a deadlock over plans for an album and she abandoned the contract.

Blue Notes has been re-released as a remastered limited edition CD with bonus tracks in 2009.

Terry contributed all the backing vocals to the track "Whole New Way" on the 2010 Scissor Sisters album Night Work.

== Media production career ==
Terry moved into film and television production, beginning as a children's TV researcher in 1990, and as a producer for the BRIT Awards TV broadcast since 2001, becoming the executive producer in 2005. The 2008 broadcast attracted 6.1 million viewers.

== Discography ==
=== Singles ===
Single	Date	Label	7" B-side	Additional tracks	UK chart position	AUS chart position
"Love Lies Lost"	April 1984	Virgin	"Laughter on My Mind (live)"	"Love Lies Lost (extended version)" (on 12")	34	34
"Stuttering"	1 October 1984	Virgin	"Stuttering (dub mix)"	"Stuttering (club mix)" (on 12")	84	-
"Now You're Mine"	12 November 1984	Virgin	"Now You're Mine (instrumental)"	"Now You're Mine (extended)" (on 12")	-	-
"Act of Mercy"	1986	Virgin	"Over The Border"	"Love Money And Sex" (on 12")	-	-
"Come on and Find Me"	1986	Virgin	"Reach Out"	"Come on And Find Me (Alternative Mix)", "The River" (on 12")	-	-
"Lessons in Loneliness"	1989	Parlophone	"Lessons in Loneliness (radio version)"	"Lessons in Loneliness (lessons learned)", "Lessons in Loneliness (Olympic version)", "Fortunate Fool (radio version)" (on CD single)	-	-
"Fortunate Fool"	1989	Parlophone	"Heart of a Woman"	"Lessons in Loneliness", "Fortunate Fool (extended version)" (on EP)	-	-

=== Album ===
- Blue Notes (1986)

Track listing

1. "Act Of Mercy" (Lamont Dozier)
2. "Come On And Find Me" (Helen Terry, George O'Dowd, Roy Hay)
3. "Love Money And Sex" (Terry, Willis)
4. "Right In Front Of You" (Helen Terry, Raymond Jones)
5. "Forbidden Fruit" (Phil Pickett, Robertson)
6. "All Night Makes It Right" (Raymond Jones)
7. "The Perfect Kiss" (Terry, Dudley)
8. "Feelin' Your Heart" (Helen Terry, George O'Dowd, Roy Hay)
9. "Close Watch" (John Cale)
10. "Stuttering" (Terry, Matkosky, Prestopino)
11. "The River" (Dudley, Bell) (on tape and CD only)
- Blue Notes (Special Edition) (2009)

Bonus tracks

1. "Love Lies Lost" (Helen Terry, George O'Dowd, Roy Hay)
2. "Laughter On My Mind (Live Version)" (Helen Terry, George O'Dowd, Roy Hay)
3. "Now You're Mine" (Moroder, St John, Lemorande)
4. "Stuttering (Club Mix)" (Terry, Matkosky, Prestopino)
5. "Act Of Mercy (12" Mix)" (Lamont Dozier)
6. "Reach Out" (Terry, Saisse, Frederix)
7. "Come On And Find Me (Alternative Mix)" (Helen Terry, George O'Dowd, Roy Hay)
