= David Levine (photographer) =

British photographer

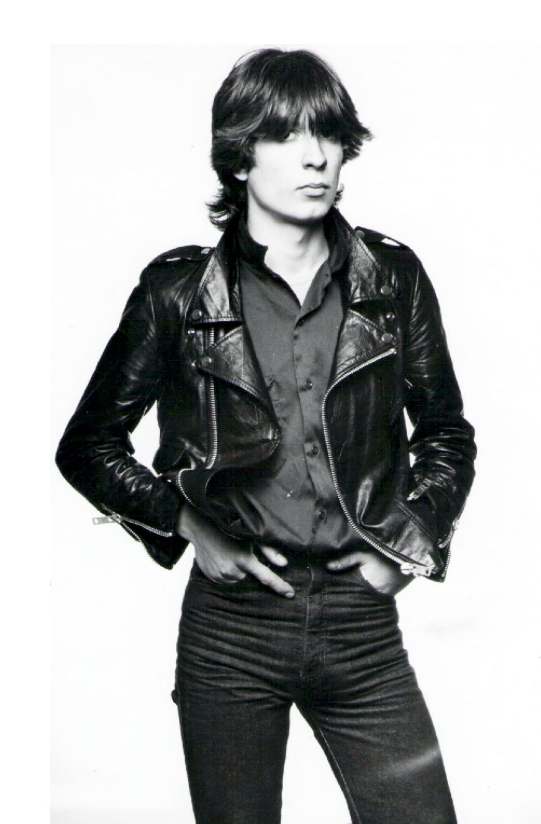
- David Levine in 1980
- Born: 1960 (age 65–66)
- Occupations: Music, portrait and fashion photographer
- Years active: 1977–
- Known for: Work with Culture Club, ABC, The Cure, Kylie Minogue, Steve Strange and Tim Pope.
- Notable work: His cover of Boy George on the "Karma Chameleon" single sleeve is one of the most recognised images of Boy George. One of his many shoots with ABC inspired the cartoons characters of the band that were used on the cover of the How to Be a Zillionaire album.

David Levine (born 1960) is a British music, portrait and fashion photographer. He is best known for his work with Culture Club, ABC, Kylie Minogue and The Cure.

== Career ==
David Levine started his career in 1977 while working as a photographer's assistant. He went on to photograph artists live in concert including Iggy Pop live at the Music Machine London and worked as a stills photographer on music videos with the director Tim Pope. As well as working with Culture Club, Levine also worked with a number of other 1980s acts including ABC, The Cure, Kylie Minogue, Jermaine Jackson, 5 Star, and Siouxsie Sioux.

Levine quickly established a style of work in the studio, which was much copied by other music and fashion photographers in the '80s and indeed today his influence can still be seen. That style and work ethic (Levine shot virtually every day in the 80s) earned him the nickname 'The man who shot the 80's'. Always filming throughout his stills career, his music videos are as typically stylish and gritty as his stills. Levine's work in both stills and film achieves a style unique to him.

Levine was invited to lecture at the University of Arts London, London College of Fashion in 2014 where he continues to lecture on Fashion Photography while continuing with his busy photography and film career.

Levine's 2009 portrait of Paul Nicholls is held in the National Portrait Gallery. Levine is currently guest lecturing on Fashion and digital Photography at the University of the Arts London, London College of Fashion.

== Personal life ==
He is the younger brother of record producer Steve Levine.
