= I'll Tumble 4 Ya =

Single by Culture Club

from the album Kissing to Be Clever
- B-side: "Mystery Boy"
- Released: June 17, 1983 (US)
- Recorded: 1982
- Genre: New wave
- Length: 2:36 (single version); 4:39 (12" vinyl single)
- Label: Virgin, Epic
- Songwriters: Boy George, Jon Moss, Mikey Craig, Roy Hay

Culture Club singles chronology
"Time (Clock of the Heart)" (1982)	"I'll Tumble 4 Ya" (1983)	"Church of the Poison Mind" (1983)

"I'll Tumble 4 Ya" is a song by English band Culture Club, released in 1983 as the fifth and final single from their debut album, Kissing to Be Clever (1982). The 7" single was released only in North America, peaking at #9 in the U.S. and #5 in Canada. In Australia, it was released in September 1983 as a double A-side single with "Karma Chameleon", peaking at #1 and receiving substantial airplay. With this single, in America, Culture Club was the first band to have three top 10 singles from a debut album since the Beatles. Cash Box called the song "an up tempo percussive dance number with none of the overbearing production gimmicks of competing new music groups" and praised the horn parts.

== Track listing ==
Canada 7" vinyl

1. A. "I'll Tumble 4 Ya" – 2:32
2. B. "Man Shake" – 2:34

USA 7" vinyl

1. A. "I'll Tumble 4 Ya" – 2:32
2. B. "Mystery Boy"

USA 12" vinyl

1. A. "I'll Tumble 4 Ya" (12") – 4:38
2. B. "Man Shake" – 2:34

== Official versions ==
- "I'll Tumble 4 Ya" (7") – 2:36
- "I'll Tumble 4 Ya" (U.S. 12" Remix) – 4:38
- "I'll Tumble 4 Ya" (VH1 Storytellers Live)

== Chart positions ==
=== Weekly charts ===
Weekly chart performance for "I'll Tumble 4 Ya"
Chart (1983–1984)	Peak position
Australian ARIA Charts	1
Canadian RPM Top Singles	5
US Billboard Hot 100	9
US Billboard Hot Dance Club Play	14
US Billboard Hot Adult Contemporary	33

=== Year-end charts ===
Year-end chart performance for "I'll Tumble 4 Ya"
Chart (1983)	Position
Canada Top Singles (RPM)	49
US Top Pop Singles (Billboard)	77
