= Karma Chameleon =

1983 song by Culture Club

Single by Culture Club

from the album Colour by Numbers
- B-side: "That's the Way (I'm Only Trying to Help You)"
- Released: 5 September 1983
- Genre: Soul; new wave; R&B
- Length: 4:12 (album version); 3:59 (single edit)
- Label: Virgin
- Songwriters: Boy George; Jon Moss; Mikey Craig; Roy Hay; Phil Pickett
- Producer: Steve Levine

Culture Club singles chronology
"Church of the Poison Mind" (1983)	"Karma Chameleon" (1983)	"Victims" (1983)

Music video
- "Karma Chameleon" on YouTube

"Karma Chameleon" is a song by English band Culture Club, featured on the group's 1983 album Colour by Numbers. The single was released in the United Kingdom in September 1983 and became the second Culture Club single to reach the top of the UK singles chart, after "Do You Really Want to Hurt Me". The record stayed at number one for six weeks and became the UK's biggest-selling single of the year 1983, selling 955,000 copies in 1983 and certificated platinum by BPI. To date, it is the 38th-biggest-selling single of all time in the UK, selling over 1.52 million copies.

The song was a worldwide success, going number one in 20 countries. It also spent three weeks at number one on the US Billboard Hot 100 in early 1984, becoming the group's biggest hit and only US number-one single among their many top-10 hits. The single sold over 5 million copies globally. In 2015, the song was voted by the British public as the nation's ninth favourite 1980s number one in a poll for ITV. The sleeve features work from the photographer David Levine.

== Background ==
In an interview, Culture Club frontman Boy George explained: "The song is about the terrible fear of alienation that people have, the fear of standing up for one thing. It's about trying to suck up to everybody. Basically, if you aren't true, if you don't act like you feel, then you get Karma-justice, that's nature's way of paying you back." In response to claims from singer-songwriter Jimmy Jones that the song plagiarizes his hit "Handy Man", George stated: "I might have heard it once, but it certainly wasn't something I sat down and said, 'Yeah, I want to copy this.'" In an interview with 60 Minutes Australia, Boy George said that he wrote the song while he was on vacation in Egypt, and that the other members of Culture Club were initially hesitant to record it as they felt it sounded like a country song.

The title of the song seems to have been changed because, in interviews in mid-1983, the group said their next single was to be "Cameo Chameleon". The harmonica part was played by Judd Lander, who had been a member of Merseybeat group The Hideaways in the 1960s; the harmonica lines and several chords were directly copied from the Undertones' 1983 single "Chain of Love". "Karma Chameleon" is written in the key of B♭ major.

== Reception ==
Cash Box said that "with Boy George's smooth lead (and the catchy background vocals), it has the air of an immediate Stateside hit". The song won Best British Single at the 1984 Brit Awards. In 2015 the song was voted by the British public as the nation's 9th favourite 1980s number one in a poll for ITV.

== Other appearances ==
The group performed the song as a finale when they appeared in the 1986 episode "Cowboy George" of The A-Team. Likely because of the line "I'm a man without conviction" and the chorus, which includes the word chameleon, "Karma Chameleon" has been used by several politicians in political adverts. In 2006, Britain's Labour Party used "Karma Chameleon" as the theme song for a series of political advertisements against Conservative Party leader David Cameron in the 2006 UK local elections.

BT used "Karma Chameleon" in a television advertisement in the United Kingdom in 2002 featuring a phone with a singing and talking chameleon. The advertisement got so popular that a variant of the phone was produced and marketed in both the United Kingdom and United States (the latter through an infomercial featuring Boy George's "approval").

The song also appears in the fictional radio station The Mix 107.77 for the game Saints Row 2. The song is also performed in Virgin Cruise's "The Voyage" advertisement. The song has also appeared in Romy and Michele's High School Reunion, Rock Star, Scary Movie 4, The Call, Sex Tape, American Dad!, Ricky Stanicky, and Despicable Me 4.

== Music video ==
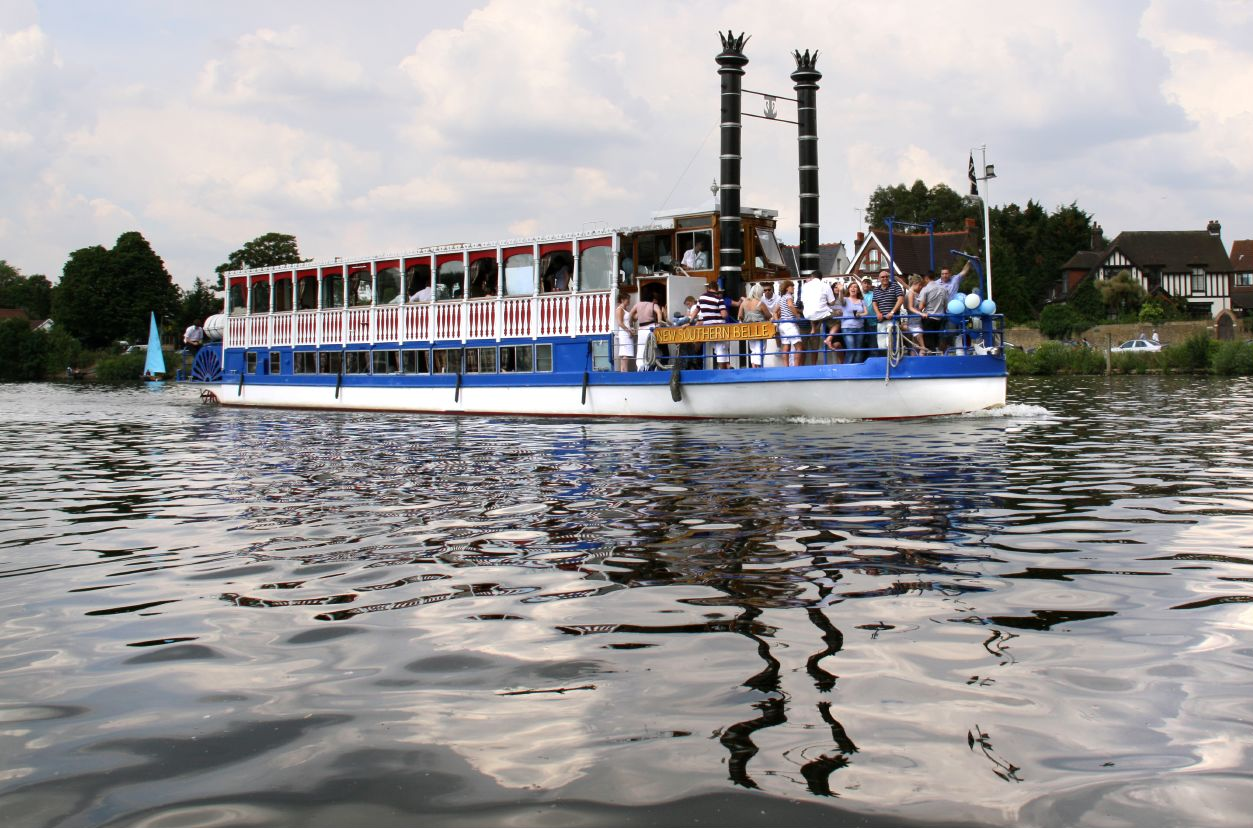
The New Southern Belle, the Thames riverboat used in video

The music video, directed by Peter Sinclair, was filmed at Desborough Island in Weybridge during 1983. The video is set in Mississippi in 1870. It depicts a large multiracial group of people in 19th-century dress, including some dressed in red, gold, and green (as referenced in the lyrics). Boy George is dressed in what would be known as his signature look: colourful costume, fingerless gloves, long braids, and a black bowler hat.

A pickpocket and jewellery thief is seen wandering through the crowd, stealing from unsuspecting victims. The band and everyone board a riverboat, The Chameleon, as Boy George continues to sing. While four men are playing poker, the thief is discovered cheating by giving himself a royal flush, and is forced to return all his ill-gotten gains and walk the plank at the points of ladies' parasols, falling into the river. As the video ends, day has turned to evening and the party continues on the boat as it cruises down the river.

== AI version ==
In 2026 Boy George released an AI-assisted remake version of the song, called "Karma Chameleon (Artist Included)", looking to capture direct streaming and sync revenues, as Virgin Records (owned by Universal Music Group) owns the master recording. Historically record labels often funded the recording studio session, marketing and distribution, and demanded ownership of the master recording. Whilst generally song publishing rights are owned by the songwriters, the master recordings of songs by older heritage acts are still often owned by the major labels they signed to.

== Charts ==
=== Weekly charts ===
Chart (1983–1984)	Peak position
Australia (Kent Music Report)	1
Austria (Ö3 Austria Top 40)	3
Belgium (Ultratop 50 Flanders)	1
Canada Adult Contemporary (RPM)	12
Canada Top Singles (RPM)	1
Chile (UPI)	4
Colombia (UPI)	6
Europe (Eurochart Hot 100)	1
Finland (Suomen virallinen lista)	3
France (IFOP)	5
Ireland (IRMA)	1
Mexico (AMPROFON)	5
Netherlands (Dutch Top 40)	1
Netherlands (Single Top 100)	1
New Zealand (Recorded Music NZ)	1
Norway (VG-lista)	1
Peru (UPI)	1
South Africa (Springbok Radio)	1
Spain (AFYVE)	1
Sweden (Sverigetopplistan)	1
Switzerland (Schweizer Hitparade)	1
UK Singles (Official Charts)	1
Uruguay (UPI)	5
US Billboard Hot 100	1
US Adult Contemporary (Billboard)	3
US Hot R&B/Hip-Hop Songs (Billboard)	67
US Cash Box Top 100	1
West Germany (GfK)	2

Chart (2017)	Peak position
Poland Airplay (ZPAV)	63

2026 weekly chart performance for "Karma Chameleon"
Chart (2026)	Peak position
Israel International Airplay (Media Forest)	9

=== Year-end charts ===
Chart (1983)	Position
Australia (Kent Music Report)	8
Belgium (Ultratop 50 Flanders)	5
Netherlands (Dutch Top 40)	11
Netherlands (Single Top 100)	10
New Zealand (Recorded Music NZ)	7
Switzerland (Schweizer Hitparade)	5
UK Singles (Official Charts Company)	1
West Germany (Official German Charts)	34

Chart (1984)	Position
Canada Top Singles (RPM)	5
South Africa (Springbok Radio)	7
US Billboard Hot 100	10
US Adult Contemporary (Billboard)	32
US Cash Box Top 100	14

== Certifications and sales ==
Region	Certification	Certified units/sales
Brazil (Pro-Música Brasil)	Diamond	250,000^{‡}
Canada (Music Canada)	2× Platinum	200,000^{^}
Denmark (IFPI Danmark)	Platinum	90,000^{‡}
France (SNEP)	Gold	500,000^{*}
Germany (BVMI)	Gold	300,000^{‡}
Italy (FIMI)	Gold	25,000^{‡}
New Zealand (RMNZ)	3× Platinum	90,000^{‡}
Spain (Promusicae)	Platinum	60,000^{‡}
United Kingdom (BPI) 1983 release	Platinum	1,000,000^{^}
United Kingdom (BPI) 2005 release	2× Platinum	1,200,000^{‡}
United States (RIAA)	Gold	1,000,000^{^}
Summaries
Worldwide	—	5,000,000
^{*} Sales figures based on certification alone.^{^} Shipments figures based on certification alone.^{‡} Sales+streaming figures based on certification alone.

== Parodies ==
The United Australia Party created "Palmer Chameleon", a parody of "Karma Chameleon" promoting the party and leader Clive Palmer in particular, as part of the soundtrack of their Clive Palmer: Humble Meme Merchant mobile video game. Boy George and Culture Club's manager have said that the unauthorised use of the song constitutes copyright infringement, and have stated that their record label would be dealing with the matter.

== See also ==
- List of best-selling singles by year in the United Kingdom
- List of Billboard Hot 100 number ones of 1984
- List of Cashbox Top 100 number-one singles of 1984
- List of Dutch Top 40 number-one singles of 1983
- List of European number-one hits of 1983
- List of number-one singles and albums in Sweden
- List of number-one singles from the 1980s (New Zealand)
- List of number-one singles in Australia during the 1980s
- List of number-one singles of 1983 (Ireland)
- List of number-one singles of 1983 (Spain)
- List of number-one singles of 1984 (Canada)
- List of number-one singles of the 1980s (Switzerland)
- List of UK singles chart number ones of the 1980s
- VG-lista 1964 to 1994
