= Miss Me Blind =

1984 single by Culture Club

Single by Culture Club

from the album Colour by Numbers
- B-side: "Colour by Numbers"
- Released: 14 February 1984 (US)
- Recorded: 1983
- Genre: Pop-funk; R&B; new wave
- Length: 4:29
- Label: Virgin; Epic
- Songwriters: Boy George; Mikey Craig; Roy Hay; Jon Moss
- Producer: Steve Levine

Culture Club singles chronology
"Victims" (1983)	"Miss Me Blind" (1984)	"It's a Miracle" (1984)

"Miss Me Blind" is a song by English new wave band Culture Club. It was the third single released from the album Colour by Numbers (1983) in North America, peaking at number 5 on the US Billboard Hot 100 chart in spring 1984. This gave the band its sixth consecutive top 10 hit in the US, as well as its final top 10 hit in that country, although the group would score several other top 20 hits in the US. The single reached number 5 in Canada, and was also released in several South American countries, Australia, and Japan. It was also the band's biggest R&B hit, reaching number 5 on the US Billboard Soul/R&B chart.

Cash Box said that the song illustrates lead singer "Boy George's knack for finding the right beat for the right lyrics and singing them in the right way" and that his vocal is "well complemented by an unflagging beat and soulful background vocals."

A very popular 12-inch was issued, gaining big success in American clubs and elsewhere. The popular extended 12-inch version contained extracts of the other Culture Club hit of the spring, "It's a Miracle". In the US, the "Miss Me Blind" / "It's a Miracle" 12" single reached No. 10 on the Billboard Hot Dance Club Play chart in May 1984. The official music video features the four members of Culture Club in a Japanese setting; Japan was one of several countries where the band was extremely popular. The music video was directed by Steve Barron. Backing vocals on "Miss Me Blind" were performed by R&B singer Jermaine Stewart.

The song was featured in the 2016 video game Watch Dogs 2.

== Formats and track listings ==
US/Canada/Australia/France/Italy/Japan 7"

A. "Miss Me Blind" – 4:28
B. "Colour by Numbers" (non-album track) – 3:57

Mexico 7"

A. "Miss Me Blind" – 4:28
B. "Victims" – 4:56

Brazil 7"

A. "Miss Me Blind" – 4:31
B. "Boy, Boy (I'm the Boy)" – 3:46

US / Canada 12"

A. "Miss Me Blind/It's a Miracle" (extended dance remix) – 9:08
B. "Colour by Numbers" – 3:57

France 12"

A. "It's a Miracle/Miss Me Blind" (US remix) – 9:08
B1. "Love Twist" – 4:23
B2. "Melting Pot" (live) – 4:30

== Charts ==
=== Weekly charts ===
Chart (1984)	Position
Canada Top Singles (RPM)	6
US Hot 100 (Billboard)	5

=== Year-end charts ===
Chart (1984)	Position
US Top Pop Singles (Billboard)	63
