= Victims (song) =

Single by Culture Club

from the album Colour by Numbers
- B-side: "Colour by Numbers"; "Romance Revisited"
- Released: 28 November 1983
- Recorded: 1983
- Genre: Sophisti-pop
- Length: 4:56
- Label: Virgin
- Songwriters: Roy Hay; Boy George; Mikey Craig; Jon Moss
- Producer: Steve Levine

Culture Club singles chronology
"Karma Chameleon" (1983)	"Victims" (1983)	"Miss Me Blind" (1984)

"Victims" is a song by English band Culture Club, released as a single in 1983 and taken from the album Colour by Numbers. As with most early Culture Club singles, the song is about lead singer Boy George's then publicly unknown and rather turbulent relationship with drummer Jon Moss. Although the group's previous single "Karma Chameleon" had been a massive hit throughout the world, "Victims" was only issued in the United Kingdom, Ireland, Italy, Germany, and Australia. The piano ballad peaked at #3 on the UK Singles Chart. In Ireland, it peaked at #2, and in Australia, at #4. The single was not released in the United States, Canada or Japan, where they released "Miss Me Blind" instead.

Its B-side was the then previously unreleased track "Colour by Numbers", which despite having the same name as the album was not included on it. An instrumental version was also issued on the 12″, renamed "Romance Revisited". Both extra tracks are now available on the 2003 remastered version of Colour by Numbers. Boy George re-recorded the song himself as a solo artist, as a folk arrangement with piano and an orchestra, in 2002. That version can be found on the Culture Club box set that was released the same year.

== Charts ==
=== Weekly charts ===
Chart (1983–1984)	Peak position
Australia (Kent Music Report)	4
Belgium (Ultratop 50 Flanders)	11
Germany (GfK)	39
Ireland (IRMA)	2
Netherlands (Single Top 100)	17
New Zealand (Recorded Music NZ)	7
Paraguay (UPI)	9
Switzerland (Schweizer Hitparade)	18
UK Singles (OCC)	3

=== Year-end charts ===
Chart (1984)	Position
Australia (Kent Music Report)	38
