= Church of the Poison Mind =

Single by Culture Club

from the album Colour by Numbers
- B-side: Man Shake (7"); Mystery Boy (12")
- Released: 1 April 1983 (UK); October 1983 (US)
- Recorded: 1983
- Genre: Philadelphia soul; pop-soul; synth-pop; funk
- Length: 3:32
- Label: Virgin Records; Epic Records (US)
- Songwriters: Boy George, Roy Hay, Mikey Craig, Jon Moss
- Producer: Steve Levine

Culture Club singles chronology
| "I'll Tumble 4 Ya" (1983) | "Church of the Poison Mind" (1983) | "Karma Chameleon" (1983) |

"Church of the Poison Mind" is a 1983 hit single by the British new wave band Culture Club. It was released as the lead single from their second, and most successful, album Colour by Numbers. The song reached #2 in the United Kingdom, being kept out of the top spot by David Bowie's "Let's Dance". It was also the band's fourth Top 10 hit in Canada and the United States. In America, it was still climbing the charts when "Karma Chameleon" was released as a single. Epic Records released "Karma" ahead of schedule. "Church of the Poison Mind" reached its peak position the same week "Karma Chameleon" debuted on the US chart. In many countries its B-side was the heavily percussive street song "Man Shake" and in some others, such as the United States, it was the song "Mystery Boy". Both songs were on the 12-inch single in many countries, except Canada, where it was issued with an extended version of previous hit "I'll Tumble 4 Ya".

== Background ==
The song took strong influence from Stevie Wonder's song "Uptight (Everything's Alright)". Helen Terry sang backing vocals on the song.

== Critical reception ==
AllMusic critic Stewart Mason stated that Helen Terry's "fiery performance of the chorus is a pop-song masterstroke." Fellow Allmusic critic Jose J. Promis agreed that her performance "really brought the house down." Mason regarded the song as a tribute to the songs written by Holland–Dozier–Holland for Motown in the 1960s. It was ranked at number 8 among the top ten "Tracks of the Year" for 1983 by NME. In 2017, it was ranked as the number one Culture Club song by Billboard. In an interview with Rolling Stone in June 1984, Bob Dylan, when asked if he belonged to any church, joked that he adhered to the "Church of the Poison Mind".

== Track listing ==
=== 7-inch record ===
A. "Church of the Poison Mind"
B. "Man Shake"

(Released in UK, Canada, Australia, France, Germany, Italy, Japan, Netherlands, Portugal, Sweden)

A. "Church of the Poison Mind"
B. "Mystery Boy"

(Released in Peru, USA.)

=== 12-inch record ===
A. "Church of the Poison Mind"
B1. "Mystery Boy"
B2. "Man Shake"

(Released at least in UK, Australia, Germany, Greece (different cover), Italy, Mexico.)

A. "Church of the Poison Mind"
B. "I'll Tumble 4 Ya" (extended dance mix)

(Released in Canada.)

== Charts ==
=== Weekly charts ===
Weekly chart performance for "Church of the Poison Mind"
| Chart (1983–1984) | Peak position |
|---|---|
| Australia (Kent Music Report) | 4 |
| Austria (Ö3 Austria Top 40) | 12 |
| Belgium (Ultratop 50 Flanders) | 9 |
| Canada Top Singles (RPM) | 5 |
| Finland (Suomen virallinen lista) | 18 |
| Italy (Musica e dischi) | 15 |
| Ireland (IRMA) | 2 |
| Japan (Oricon Singles Chart) | 23 |
| Netherlands (Dutch Top 40) | 7 |
| Netherlands (Single Top 100) | 11 |
| New Zealand (Recorded Music NZ) | 9 |
| Norway (VG-lista) | 11 |
| Sweden (Sverigetopplistan) | 13 |
| UK Singles (Official Charts) | 2 |
| West Germany (GfK) | 23 |
| US Billboard Hot 100 | 10 |

=== Year-end charts ===
Year-end chart performance for "Church of the Poison Mind"
| Chart (1983) | Position |
|---|---|
| Australia (Kent Music Report) | 37 |
| France (SNEP) | 92 |
| Netherlands (Dutch Top 40) | 84 |
| Netherlands (Single Top 100) | 94 |

| Chart (1984) | Position |
|---|---|
| US Billboard Hot 100 | 82 |
