= Time (Clock of the Heart) =

Single by Culture Club

from the album Kissing to Be Clever (US Version)
- B-side: "White Boys Can't Control It"; "Romance Beyond the Alphabet" (US version)
- Released: 19 November 1982 (UK); 29 March 1983 (US)
- Recorded: June 1982
- Genre: New pop; soul; Philadelphia soul
- Length: 3:42
- Label: Virgin, Epic
- Songwriters: Boy George, Jon Moss, Mikey Craig, Roy Hay
- Producer: Steve Levine

Culture Club singles chronology
"Do You Really Want to Hurt Me" (1982)	"Time (Clock of the Heart)" (1982)	"I'll Tumble 4 Ya" (1983)

Music video
- "Time (Clock of the Heart)" by Culture Club on YouTube

"Time (Clock of the Heart)" is a song by the British new wave band Culture Club that was released in 1982 in the UK and in 1983 in the United States. The song was released as a stand-alone single in most of the world and as the second single from the band's debut album Kissing to Be Clever in North America. As the follow-up single to their global hit, "Do You Really Want to Hurt Me", "Time (Clock of the Heart)" peaked at #2 on the US Billboard Hot 100, kept from the #1 spot by Irene Cara's "Flashdance... What a Feeling". "Time" was also a major hit in the band's native UK, reaching #3 on the UK singles chart and selling over 500,000 copies in that country.

The song appears on the North American version of Culture Club's album Kissing to Be Clever. In Europe and other regions, it does not appear on the album, but instead was released as a stand-alone single in November 1982. For many of these markets, its first inclusion on a Culture Club album was on the band's 1987 greatest hits album, This Time: The First Four Years.

== Critical reception ==
Cash Box said the song has "a gentle funk anchor on an otherwise airy romantic ballad." In a retrospective review of the song, Allmusic journalist Stewart Mason wrote: "Of all of Culture Club's early hits, Time (Clock of the Heart) has probably aged the best. Boy George drops the cryptic self-mythology long enough to deliver a tender, heartfelt lyric on lost love."

In 2022, Rolling Stone ranked it the 10th-best song of 1982 on their list "100 Best Songs of 1982".

== Formats and track listing ==
- 7" Single (UK, Europe, Canada)
1. "Time (Clock of the Heart)" – 3:42
2. "White Boys Can't Control It" – 3:42
- 7" Single (U.S.)
1. "Time (Clock of the Heart)" – 3:41
2. "Romance Beyond the Alphabet" (Time Instrumental) – 3:34
- 12" Single (UK, Europe)
1. A1. "Time (Clock of the Heart)" – 3:42
2. B1. "White Boys Can't Control It" – 3:42
3. B2. "Romance Beyond the Alphabet" – 3:44
- 12" Single (Canada)
1. A1. "Time (Clock of the Heart)" – 3:42
2. B1. "Romance Beyond The Alphabet" – 3:42
3. B2. "I'm Afraid Of Me (Extended Version)"
- 12" Single/EP (Japan)
1. A1. "Time (Clock of the Heart)" – 3:42
2. A2. "White Boy (Long Version)"
3. B1. "I'm Afraid Of Me (Long Version)"
4. B2. "Do You Really Want To Hurt Me (Dub Version)"

== Personnel ==
Culture Club

- Boy George: lead vocals and backing vocals
- Roy Hay: electric guitar and backing vocals
- Mikey Craig: keytar
- Jon Moss: drums and backing vocals

Additional members

- Helen Terry: backing vocals
- Phil Pickett: piano, glockenspiel and tubular bells
- Steve Grainger: saxophone
- Trevor Bastow: strings arrangement

== Charts ==
=== Weekly charts ===
Chart (1982)	Peak position
Belgian VRT Top 30	9
Dutch Top 40	7
Irish Singles Chart	4
UK singles chart	3
Chart (1983)	Peak position
Australia (Kent Music Report)	12
Austrian Singles Chart	9
Canadian RPM Singles Chart	4
Finland (Suomen virallinen lista)	7
German Singles Chart	16
New Zealand RIANZ Singles Chart	4
Swedish Singles Chart	11
Swiss Singles Chart	9
US Billboard Hot 100	2
US Billboard Adult Contemporary	6
US Billboard Black Singles	34

=== Year-end charts ===
Year-end chart (1983)	Position
Australia (Kent Music Report)	79
Canada Top Singles (RPM)	23
US Top Pop Singles (Billboard)	34

== Certifications ==
Country	Provider	Certification	Sales/shipments
Canada	CRIA	Gold	50,000+
United Kingdom	BPI	Gold	500,000+
