= It's a Miracle (Culture Club song) =

Single by Culture Club

from the album Colour by Numbers
- B-side: "Love Twist" (live); "Melting Pot" (live)
- Released: 12 March 1984
- Genre: Pop-soul; calypso; R&B
- Length: 3:25
- Label: Virgin
- Songwriters: Boy George; Roy Hay; Jon Moss; Mikey Craig; Phil Pickett
- Producer: Steve Levine

Culture Club singles chronology
"Miss Me Blind" (1984)	"It's a Miracle" (1984)	"The War Song" (1984)

"It's a Miracle" is the fifth and final single from English pop band Culture Club's second album, Colour by Numbers (1983). The song became the group's sixth hit on the UK Singles Chart, peaking at number four. It also reached number 13 on the US Billboard Hot 100, number five in New Zealand, and number two in Ireland. The song was first titled "It's America", relating to Culture Club's first trip to the United States, but was later changed.

== Reception ==
Cash Box called the song "a perfect example of British adopted American R&B."

== Chart performance ==
The song became the group's sixth top-five hit on the UK Singles Chart, peaking at number four. It reached number 13 on the US Billboard Hot 100 and number 16 on the Canadian RPM chart. It also reached number eight on the Billboard Adult Contemporary chart and number two on the RPM Adult Contemporary chart.

== Music video ==
The music video features the band playing around on a circular board with various Monopoly spaces placed around the edges. Interspersed with these are clips from previous Culture Club music videos.

== B-sides ==
The B-side of the 7-inch single is a live rendition of "Love Twist", a song from the group's first album. It was recorded in December 1983. An additional live track, "Melting Pot" (a cover of the song by the group Blue Mink), from the same show was available on the 12-inch single.

== Track listing ==
Standard 7-inch single

A. "It's a Miracle"
B. "Love Twist" (live)

Peruvian and Ecuadorian 7-inch single

A. "It's a Miracle"
B. "Miss Me Blind"

12-inch single

A1. "It's a Miracle/Miss Me Blind (Multimix)"
B1. "Love Twist" (live)
B2. "Melting Pot" (live)

== Charts ==
=== Weekly charts ===
Chart (1984)	Peak position
Australia (Kent Music Report)	14
Belgium (Ultratop 50 Flanders)	15
Canada Top Singles (RPM)	5
Canada Adult Contemporary (RPM)	5
Europe (European Top 100 Singles)	7
Ireland (IRMA)	2
Netherlands (Dutch Top 40)	20
Netherlands (Single Top 100)	15
New Zealand (Recorded Music NZ)	5
UK Singles (Official Charts)	4
US Billboard Hot 100	13
US Adult Contemporary (Billboard)	8
US Dance Club Songs (Billboard) with "Miss Me Blind"	10
West Germany (GfK)	41

=== Year-end charts ===
Chart (1984)	Position
Australia (Kent Music Report)	95
