= Do You Really Want to Hurt Me =

1982 song by Culture Club

Single by Culture Club

from the album Kissing to Be Clever
- B-side: "Do You Really Want to Hurt Me (Dub version)" (7"); "Love Is Cold (You Were Never No Good)" (12")
- Released: 6 September 1982
- Recorded: 1982
- Genre: Lovers rock; reggae; new wave; blue-eyed soul
- Length: 4:22; 3:41 (MTV video edit)
- Label: Virgin; Epic
- Songwriters: Boy George; Mikey Craig; Roy Hay; Jon Moss
- Producer: Steve Levine

Culture Club singles chronology
"Mystery Boy" (1982)	"Do You Really Want to Hurt Me" (1982)	"Time (Clock of the Heart)" (1982)

Music video
- "Do You Really Want to Hurt Me" on YouTube

"Do You Really Want to Hurt Me" is a song written and performed by English new wave band Culture Club. Released as a single in September 1982 from the group's platinum-selling debut album, Kissing to Be Clever (1982), this ballad was the band's first major hit and first UK No. 1 hit. In the United States, the single was released in November 1982 and also became a hit, reaching No. 2 for three weeks.

== Release ==
"Do You Really Want to Hurt Me" was the third single released in Europe by Culture Club and their debut release in the United States and Canada. The song became a UK No. 1 single for three weeks in October 1982. It entered the American Pop chart the week ending 4 December 1982, hit No. 1 in Cash Box magazine, and held at No. 2 for three weeks on the Billboard Hot 100 chart in March and April 1983. The single hit No. 1 in Canada. It was also number one in Australia. In the UK, it was the fifth best-selling single of 1982, selling 882 440 copies.

This was Culture Club's first major success, after their first two releases at the Virgin Records label, "White Boy" and "I'm Afraid of Me", charted lower in the UK at No. 114 and No. 100 respectively. Producer Steve Levine later said: "We felt very strongly that we had a great track with 'Do You Really Want to Hurt Me' and Virgin agreed."

Within a few days of "Do You Really Want to Hurt Me" being released, David Hamilton on BBC Radio 2 played the song as his record of the week. The song rose rapidly in the UK charts after the group's first appearance on Top of the Pops, which resulted in Boy George's androgynous style of dress and sexual ambiguity making newspaper headlines. The group were only asked to appear on Top of the Pops the night before the show, after Shakin' Stevens pulled out.

In a retrospective review, Allmusic described "Do You Really Want to Hurt Me" as "a simple masterpiece, resonating with an ache that harked back to the classic torch songs of yesteryear." In 2007, Boy George said that the song was "not just about Culture Club's drummer Jon Moss, my boyfriend at the time. It was about all the guys I dated at that time in my life."

== Music video ==
The original accompanying music video for the song played in the UK and other Countries other than the USA/Canada was directed by Julien Temple, featured lead singer Boy George on trial in a courtroom (filmed in Islington Town Hall Council Chamber), with flashbacks to the Gargoyle Club, Soho in 1936 and the Dolphin Square Health Club, Pimlico in 1957. Some scenes were filmed at the Hornsey Road swimming baths in Islington, which later closed in 1991.

As the video featured blackface (considered a racist stereotypical trope in the USA), the video was edited for MTV USA to remove scenes with blackface and judges wearing wigs - and was instead replaced by shots of Boy George played backwards as he walked out of a pool becoming dry as he ascended from the stairs. [This version is in MTV archives, but has been since deprecated on all video services, such as YouTube, and only the original remains available to view today].

== Track listings ==
- 7-inch

A. "Do You Really Want to Hurt Me" – 4:22
B. "Do You Really Want to Hurt Me" (Dub version) (feat. Pappa Weasel) – 3:38

(Released at least in UK, Canada, Australia, France, West Germany, Italy, Japan, Portugal, Spain, Sweden)

A. "Do You Really Want to Hurt Me" – 4:23
B. "You Know I'm Not Crazy" – 3:35

(Released in USA, Mexico)

- 12-inch

A1. "Do You Really Want to Hurt Me" – 4:22
A2. "Do You Really Want to Hurt Me" (Dub Version) – 3:38
B1. "Love Is Cold" (non-album track) – 4:23

(Released at least in UK, Canada (different cover), USA, Australia, France, West Germany, Italy, Netherlands (different cover), Spain)

- CD single (1992 re-issue)
1. "Do You Really Want to Hurt Me" – 4:22
2. "Do You Really Want to Hurt Me" (Dub Version) – 3:38
3. "Bow Down Mister" (Sitari Bizarri Mix) – 6:24 (Released in Germany in 1992, to promote the compilation album Spin Dazzle)
- CD single (2005 remix)
1. "Do You Really Want to Hurt Me" (DJ LBR 2005 remix) – 3:59
2. "Do You Really Want to Hurt Me" – 4:25

(Released as a remix version in France, to promote the compilation album Culture Club 2005 – Singles & Remixes, with new video)

== Charts ==
=== Weekly charts ===
Chart (1982–1983)	Peak position
Australia (ARIA)	1
Austria (Ö3 Austria Top 40)	1
Belgium (Ultratop 50 Flanders)	1
Canada (The Record)	1
Canada Top Singles (RPM)	1
Canada Adult Contemporary (RPM)	4
Denmark (Hitlisten)	1
Europe (European Hot 100 Singles)	1
Finland (Suomen virallinen lista)	12
France (SNEP)	1
Ireland (IRMA)	1
Netherlands (Dutch Top 40)	2
New Zealand (Recorded Music NZ)	2
Norway (VG-lista)	2
South Africa (Springbok)	11
Spain (Promusicae)	7
Sweden (Sverigetopplistan)	1
Switzerland (Schweizer Hitparade)	1
UK Singles (Official Charts)	1
US Billboard Hot 100	2
US Adult Contemporary (Billboard)	8
US Hot R&B/Hip-Hop Songs (Billboard)	39
US Mainstream Rock Airplay (Billboard)	21
West Germany (GfK)	1

Chart (2005)	Peak position
Belgium (Ultratop 50 Wallonia)	24
France (SNEP)	16

2026 weekly chart performance
Chart (2026)	Peak position
Israel International Airplay (Media Forest)	6

=== Year-end charts ===
Chart (1982)	Rank
Netherlands (Dutch Top 40)	20
New Zealand (Recorded Music NZ)	21
UK Singles (OCC)	5

Chart (1983)	Rank
Australia (Kent Music Report)	22
Canada Top Singles (RPM)	2
US Billboard Hot 100	11

== Certifications and sales ==
Region	Certification	Certified units/sales
Canada (Music Canada)	Platinum	100,000^{^}
Denmark (IFPI Danmark)	Gold	4,000^{^}
France (SNEP)	Gold	500,000^{*}
Germany (BVMI)	Gold	500,000^{^}
Netherlands (NVPI)	Gold	100,000^{^}
New Zealand (RMNZ)	Gold	15,000^{‡}
Sweden (GLF)	Gold	25,000^{^}
United Kingdom (BPI)	Gold	882,440
^{*} Sales figures based on certification alone.^{^} Shipments figures based on certification alone.^{‡} Sales+streaming figures based on certification alone.

== Covers ==
The song has been covered by such artists as Violent Femmes, but with altered lyrics, and Adam Lambert.

A cover by American musicians Karma Fields and Shey Baba was released on 23 September 2020.

=== Blue Lagoon version ===
"Do You Really Want to Hurt Me"

Single by Blue Lagoon

from the album Club Lagoon
- Released: 13 February 2005
- Length: 3:29
- Label: Kon$um, SME
- Songwriters: Michael Craig, Roy Hay, Jon Moss, George O'Dowd
- Producer: Felix J. Gauder

Blue Lagoon singles chronology
"Break My Stride" (2004)	"Do You Really Want to Hurt Me" (2005)	"Heartbreaker" (2005)

The song was covered in 2005 by German band Blue Lagoon on its album Club Lagoon and became a hit in Europe.

=== Track listings ===
CD single

1. "Do You Really Want to Hurt Me" (radio edit) – 3:29
2. "Do You Really Want to Hurt Me" (extended version) – 4:59

=== Charts ===
Chart (2005)	Peak position
Austrian Singles Chart	21
Danish Singles Chart	11
Germany (GfK)	13
Hungary (Editors' Choice Top 40)	35
Swedish Singles Chart	29
Swiss Singles Chart	32
