= Culture Club =

English pop band

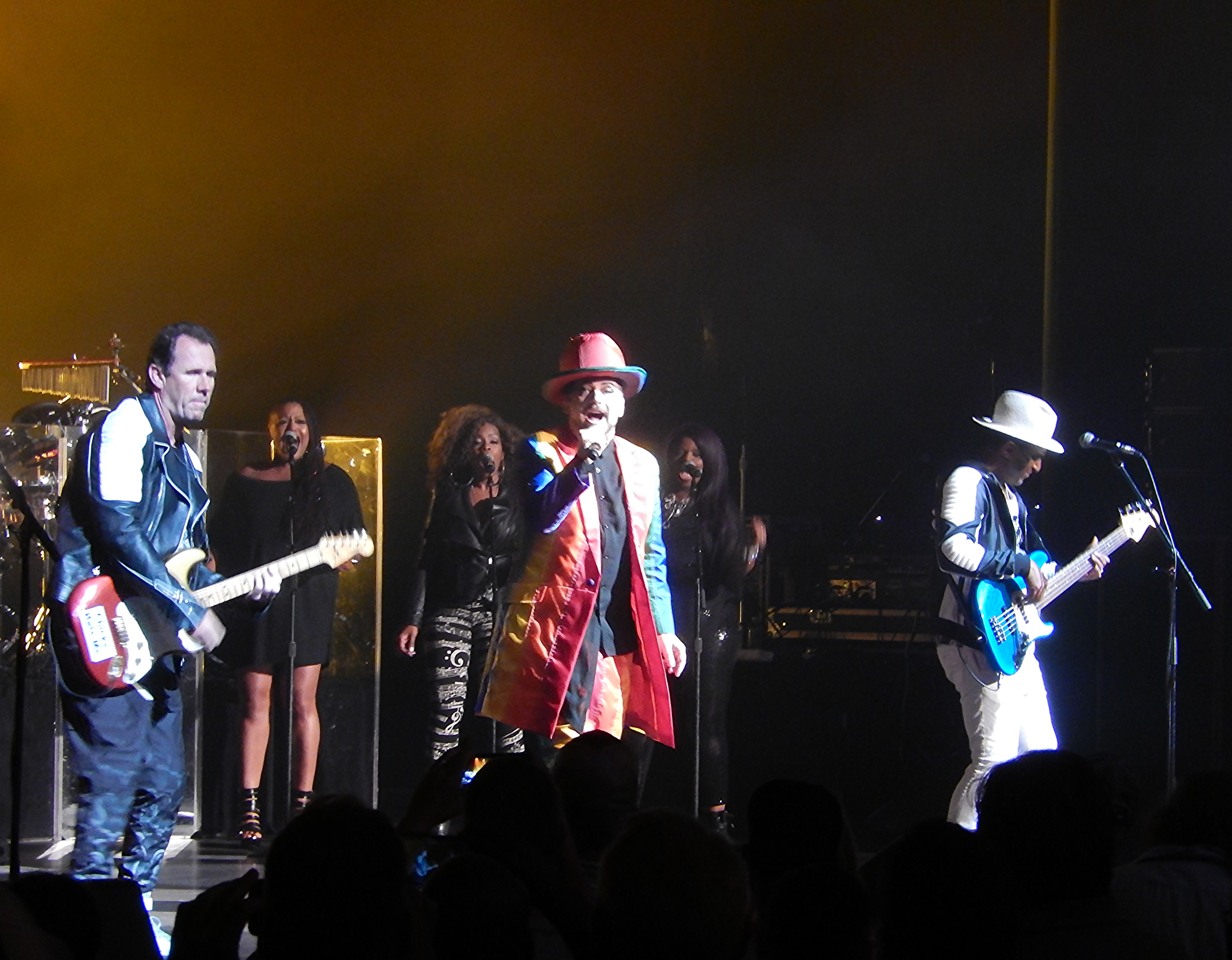
- Culture Club performing in July 2016, from left to right: Roy Hay, Boy George and Mikey Craig

Background information
- Origin: London, England
- Genres: Pop; new wave; pop rock; blue-eyed soul
- Years active: 1981–1986; 1998–2002; 2011–present
- Labels: Virgin; Epic; BMG
- Members: Boy George; Mikey Craig; Roy Hay
- Past members: Jon Moss
- Website: boygeorgeandcultureclub.net

Culture Club are an English pop band formed in London in 1981. The band comprises Boy George (lead vocals), Roy Hay (guitar and keyboards), and Mikey Craig (bass guitar), and formerly included Jon Moss (drums and percussion). Emerging in the New Romantic scene, they are considered one of the most representative and influential groups of the 1980s.

Led by singer and frontman Boy George, whose androgynous style of dressing caught the attention of the public and the media in the early 1980s, the band have sold more than 50 million records, including over six million BPI certified records sold in the UK and over seven million RIAA certified records sold in the US. In the UK they amassed twelve top 40 hit singles between 1982 and 1999, including the number ones "Do You Really Want to Hurt Me"" and "Karma Chameleon", the latter being the biggest-selling single of 1983 in the UK and a number one hit in the US. The Culture Club song "Time (Clock of the Heart)" is included on the Rock and Roll Hall of Fame's list of 500 songs that shaped rock and roll. Other hits were "Church of the Poison Mind" and "The War Song".

Their second album, Colour by Numbers, sold more than 10 million copies worldwide. It appeared on Rolling Stone magazine's list of the 100 Best Albums of the 1980s and is also included in the book 1001 Albums You Must Hear Before You Die. Ten of their singles reached the US top 40, where they are associated with the Second British Invasion of British "new music" groups that became popular in the US due to the cable music channel MTV. Culture Club's music has been described as combining new wave and American soul and pop. It also includes some elements of Jamaican reggae and other styles such as calypso, salsa, and, with "Karma Chameleon", elements of country music.

In 1984, Culture Club won Brit Awards for Best British Group, Best British Single ("Karma Chameleon"), and the Grammy Award for Best New Artist. They were nominated the same year for the Grammy Award for Pop Vocal by Group or Duo. The band were also nominated for a Canadian Juno Award for International Album of the Year. In January 1985, Culture Club were nominated for an American Music Award for Favorite Pop/Rock Band/Duo/Group Video Artist, and in September 1985, they were nominated for two MTV Video Music Awards for Best Special Effects and Best Art Direction for their video "It's a Miracle". In 1987, they received another nomination for an American Music Award for Favorite Pop/Rock Band/Duo/Group Video Artist. The name of the band Culture Club is a reference to the fact that its members all have unique cultural backgrounds, including Jamaican, Irish, and Jewish heritage.

== History ==
=== 1981–1983: Formation and Kissing to Be Clever ===
In 1981, Blitz Club regular Boy George occasionally sang with the group Bow Wow Wow, performing under the stage name Lieutenant Lush, with manager Malcolm McLaren going so far as to envision him as a second vocalist alongside lead singer Annabella Lwin. George would leave the group after alleged clashes between them.

After his tenure with Bow Wow Wow ended, George formed his own group with bassist Mikey Craig and guitarist Jon Suede. Initially called In Praise of Lemmings, the group soon renamed themselves as The Sex Gang Children. In 1981, drummer Jon Moss (formerly of the Damned and Adam and the Ants) was recruited and Jon Suede was replaced by guitarist Roy Hay and the band change their name again to Culture Club. The band's name was chosen when they realized that they had a gay frontman of Irish ethnicity (George), a black Briton (Craig) on bass, a blond Englishman (Hay) on guitar and keyboards, and a Jewish drummer (Moss). The abandoned name The Sex Gang Children was adopted by another group.

Culture Club recorded demos, which were paid for by EMI Records, but the label was unimpressed and decided not to sign the group. Virgin Publishing heard the demos and signed the group to a songwriting contract. Virgin Records then offered the group a recording deal, releasing the albums in Europe, while Epic Records released their albums in North America and much of the rest of the world.

The band released two singles in May and June 1982, "White Boy" and "I'm Afraid of Me", though both failed to chart. In September of that year, Virgin released their third single, "Do You Really Want to Hurt Me", a reggae-influenced number, which became one of their biggest hits. The song went to No. 1 in the UK in late 1982 and became an international smash, topping the charts in twenty-three countries (No. 2 in the US), and the top ten in several more countries.

The band's 1982 debut on Top of the Pops created tabloid headlines, which focused on George's androgynous style of dress and sexual ambiguity. Magazines began to feature George prominently on their covers. Pete Burns, lead singer of the pop band Dead or Alive, would later claim he was the first to wear braids, big hats, and colorful costumes, but George would cut back with a sharp-tongued remark, "It's not who did it first, it's who did it better."

The band's debut album Kissing to Be Clever (UK No. 5, US No. 14) was released in October 1982, and the follow-up single, "Time (Clock of the Heart)", became another Top 10 hit in the US (Number 2) and UK (Number 3). "I'll Tumble 4 Ya" also became a Top Ten hit in the US (Number 9) and in Canada. This gave Culture Club the distinction of being the first group since The Beatles to have three Top Ten hits in America from a debut album. Kissing to Be Clever was certified platinum in US for 1 million shipped copies.

=== 1983–1984: Colour by Numbers ===
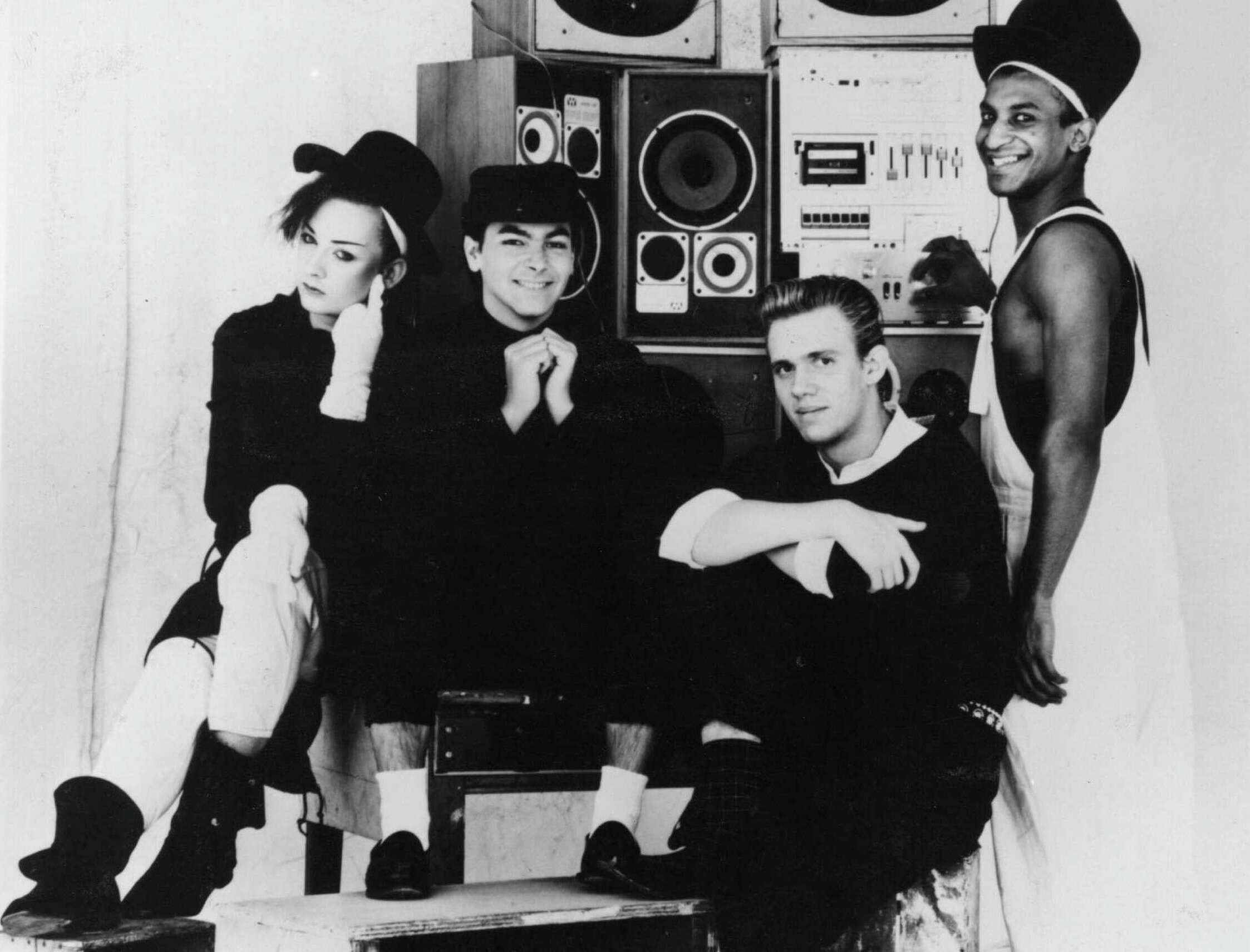
Culture Club in 1983

The band's second album, Colour by Numbers (UK No. 1, US No. 2), was released in 1983. The first single, "Church of the Poison Mind", featuring backing vocalist Helen Terry, reached the UK and US Top 10. The second single, "Karma Chameleon", gave the band their biggest hit, hitting No. 1 in the UK (the band's second chart-topper there), where it became the best-selling single of 1983 and has sold 1.5 million copies there to date. It also peaked at No. 1 in the US for three consecutive weeks, and would ultimately hit No. 1 in 30 countries, thus becoming one of the top twenty best-selling singles of the 1980s and selling seven million copies worldwide, with one of the most iconic images of Boy George on the cover shot by photographer David Levine.

The album Colour by Numbers would spawn more hits including "Miss Me Blind" (#5 US), "It's a Miracle" (#4 UK, No. 13 US), and "Victims" (#3 UK), and sold four million copies in the US alone and another five million copies worldwide, at the time of its release. The album gave Culture Club the distinction of being the first group in music history to have an album certified diamond in Canada (for sales of one million copies in that country). The band also won the 1984 Brit Award for Best Group and the Grammy Award for Best New Artist, where George gave a speech via satellite stating, "Thank you, America. You've got taste, style, and you know a good drag queen when you see one."

The group's back-up singer, Helen Terry, began work on her solo album, for which George and Hay wrote the song "Love Lies Lost". The pair also wrote "Passing Friend" for the Beach Boys' album. Culture Club wrote two songs for the soundtrack to the movie Electric Dreams. George and Hay wrote "The Dream" and "Love Is Love", with the latter being released as a single in Canada, Japan and South America, where the E.P "Love is Love" became a major hit in Brazil. George also collaborated on the song "Electric Dreams", sung by P. P. Arnold. The song was written with Phil Pickett (former member of the 1970s band Sailor) who had also co-written "Karma Chameleon" and frequently played keyboards for the group.

Despite Culture Club's commercial success, there were significant pressures within the band and George was using drugs with money earned from his new-found fame. George and Moss were also romantically involved with each other, which was unknown to the public and the media at the time. Their relationship lasted for over four years and was often turbulent, with alleged physical and verbal abuse from both sides. Their constant arguments and the pressure to hide the relationship from the public started to take its toll on the band.

=== 1984–1986: Waking Up with the House on Fire, From Luxury to Heartache and decline ===
In 1984, the group released their third album Waking Up with the House on Fire (UK No. 2, US No. 26). Although certified platinum in both the UK and the US, it was a commercial and critical disappointment compared to their first two albums. The album contained the hit single "The War Song", which reached No. 2 in the UK, and Top 20 in the US. Other singles like "Mistake No. 3" (US No. 33) and "The Medal Song" (UK No. 32) would only become modest hits. George later stated he felt the album experienced a lukewarm reception because of half-hearted material he felt they released due to pressure from Virgin and Epic. Also, according to him, the band had just come off an exhausting world tour, in 1984. At the end of 1984, Boy George was recruited by Bob Geldof to join the Band Aid recording, consisting of mostly internationally known UK and Irish recording stars. George was in New York City for an appearance on Late Night with David Letterman when Geldof called him, but managed to catch the final Concorde of the day to London and was the last singer to record a lead vocal track for the song "Do They Know It's Christmas?". The song would become the biggest selling single of all time in the UK and a huge international hit, raising millions for famine victims in several African nations, particularly Ethiopia.

Due to the break-up of his relationship with Moss, and all the ensuing tension with the rest of the band, George turned to relief in drugs. Consequently, he soon developed a self-destructive drug addiction, which in merely four months escalated from marijuana to heroin. By 1986, George had become seriously addicted. The recording of their fourth studio album, 1986's From Luxury to Heartache (UK No. 10, US No. 32) dragged on for so long that producer Arif Mardin had to abandon the sessions due to prior commitments and leave it to engineer Lew Hahn to finish the sessions. Nevertheless, the first single "Move Away" became a hit, peaking at UK No. 7 and US No. 12 and made appear that the album would return the group back to its previous success. But by the time of the release of the second single "God Thank You Woman", news of George's drug addiction began to circulate in British and American tabloids, and the second single stalled on its way up the charts, failing to make a big impact.

George and Moss also no longer wanted to be around each other due to the constant relationship battles and with George's addiction. From Luxury to Heartache began to fade from the charts as well, and the album ultimately sold fewer than one million copies worldwide at the time of release. By the summer of 1986, George finally admitted that he was addicted to drugs. In July of that year, he was arrested by the British police for possession of heroin.

Culture Club disbanded in 1986.

=== Reunions ===
==== 1989 ====
The band first tried to reunite in 1989, after many requests from Tony Gordon, the group's former manager and George's manager at that time. George agreed to try some songs with the band again, resulting in recording sessions and producing more than a dozen songs that remain unreleased. George, however, was more excited about his future projects like his record label, More Protein, and his new acid house project Jesus Loves You. The proposed reunion ended up being cancelled.

==== 1998–2000, 2002 ====
In 1998, George and Moss put their differences aside and the band reunited to do a reunion tour, kicking off with a performance on VH1 Storytellers. George said about the reunion, "Culture Club's reunion couldn't have come at a better time for rock", adding that, "It's a nostalgia trip, there's no way of avoiding that." The tour was a major success. Greatest Moments, a compilation album based around the Storytellers performance, was released, and went platinum in UK. It included new songs such as "I Just Wanna Be Loved", which hit UK No. 4. However, their new-found success was short-lived and their fifth studio album, Don't Mind If I Do, released in 1999, peaked at No. 64 in the UK. It included minor UK hits in "Your Kisses Are Charity" (UK No. 25) and "Cold Shoulder" (UK No. 43).

The band went on to tour, then reunited again for a 20th anniversary concert in 2002 at the Royal Albert Hall in London. This performance was released on DVD the following year. Culture Club then became inactive again, largely due to George's successful DJ career, as well as his semi-autobiographical musical Taboo. It was a success in London, but was a flop on Broadway (George took the role of Australian-born performance artist Leigh Bowery in the Broadway production), only running for 100 performances, as well as losing $10 million for its producer, Rosie O'Donnell.

==== 2006 ====
In 2006, original members Craig and Moss tried to launch a new tour with another lead singer, as George and Hay had declined to tour. Early that year, the band's record company placed an ad for a lead singer to "...take part in a 2007 World Tour and TV Series." The new singer, Sam Butcher was selected because of his own personality, "not a Boy George lookalike." After watching a video on MySpace, George described the singer who replaced him as "terrible" and "dreadful". George said: "I wanted to like it but I couldn't. They're my songs, they're my heart, they're my life." A proposed tour for December 2006 in the UK did not take place.

==== 2011 ====
In late 2011, George was part of a three-man Culture Club band that performed two live concerts, in Dubai and Sydney, the latter being a New Year's Eve concert, although Moss did not appear due to a back injury. However, the band were unable to tour in the US, due to George being denied a visa three years prior.

==== 2014–present ====
In 2014, the band reformed for a tour and a new album. A new picture of the four members was also posted on the band's official website, along with the list of the 11 UK concert dates.

The band travelled to Spain for a two-week recording session. 18 new tracks were completed for a new album produced by Youth. The new album, entitled Tribes, was scheduled for release in early 2015 on the band's own label Different Man Music (via Kobalt Label Services). At the end of that year, the album had still not materialised.

On 19 July 2014, the band were among the line-up for a two-hour concert in Edinburgh Castle, ahead of the opening ceremony of the Commonwealth Games in Glasgow. Hay did not perform with the band because he was in recovery after having knee surgery. The band played two songs, "Do You Really Want to Hurt Me" and "Karma Chameleon" which were shown on BBC TV.

In mid-November 2014, two days before the start of their 21-date US and UK tour, Culture Club canceled the tour due to George suffering from a serious throat condition. The cancelled tour would have represented the full original line-up's first tour in 12 years. The North American tour was eventually rescheduled and started on 17 July 2015 in Canada. A television documentary, Boy George and Culture Club: Karma to Calamity, aired on BBC Four on 6 March 2015. The programme documented the band's reunion in 2014 and the making of their new album in Spain, up to the cancelation the tour. Based on the popularity of 2015's mini-tour, Culture Club embarked on a 60-city world tour in 2016. The major success of this tour culminated in a DVD/CD/Blu-ray release, Live at Wembley: World Tour 2016.

In August 2016, the band permanently shelved the album Tribes, and offered refunds to all those who had pre-ordered the album online.

In 2018, Culture Club toured the US and Europe from June to December. Dubbed The Life Tour, the band toured in support of their namesake album, along with supporting acts the B-52s, Tom Bailey (formerly of the Thompson Twins) and Belinda Carlisle (Europe dates only). Jon Moss was originally part of the line-up, but did not participate in the European leg of the tour. A spokeswoman for Boy George confirmed: "Jon's taking a break from Culture Club but the door is open in the future." In December 2019, Moss filed a writ at London's High Court naming the band trio as defendants. Moss' lawyers say he was told to "take a break" by manager Paul Kemsley, demanding nearly £200,000 in missing payments and a share of profits. Moss officially left Culture Club in May 2021.

Culture Club returned to the SSE Arena in Wembley on 19 December 2020 for a livestream concert broadcast around the world, in response to the ongoing COVID-19 pandemic. Titled 'Rainbow in the Dark', the concert saw the band play their classic hits, new material, including a new ballad version of "Karma Chameleon" featuring Mila, and covers of T. Rex's "Get It On (Bang a Gong)" and George's solo cover of Bread's "Everything I Own".

Culture Club toured in 2022 with a residency in Las Vegas and select amphitheaters across the United States. They also served as an opening act for Rod Stewart on his Greatest Hits tour in the UK in June and July 2023, and in addition to continuing their Las Vegas residency that February, Culture Club embarked on a U.S. summer tour titled The Letting It Go Show, with Howard Jones and Berlin serving as opening acts.

== Awards and achievements ==
=== ASCAP Pop Music Awards ===
Year	Nominee / work	Award	Result
1984	"Karma Chameleon"	Most Performed Songs	Won
1984	"It's a Miracle"	Most Performed Songs	Won

=== American Music Awards ===
Year	Nominee / work	Award	Result
1985	Culture Club	Favorite Pop/Rock Band/Duo/Group	Nominated
1987	Culture Club	Favorite Pop/Rock Band/Duo/Group	Nominated

=== American Video Awards ===
Year	Nominee / work	Award	Result
1984	A Kiss Across the Ocean	Best Long-Form Video	Nominated
1984	A Kiss Across the Ocean	Best Home Video	Nominated
1984	"The War Song"	Best Choreography	Nominated
1984	"Miss Me Blind"	Best Set Design	Nominated

=== Billboard Music Awards ===
Year	Nominee / work	Award	Result
1983	Themselves	Top Pop New Artist	Nominated
1983	Themselves	Top Pop Singles Artist	Nominated
1983	Themselves	Top Pop Singles Artist – Duo/Group	Nominated
1983	Themselves	Top Adult Contemporary Artist – Duo/Group	Nominated
1983	Kissing to Be Clever	Top Pop Album	Nominated
1983	"Karma Chameleon"	Top UK Single	Won

=== BRIT Awards ===
Year	Nominee / work	Award	Result
1983	Culture Club	Best British Breakthrough Act	Won
1984	Culture Club	Best British Group	Won
1984	"Karma Chameleon"	Best British Single	Won

=== Classic Pop Reader Awards ===
Year	Nominee / work	Award	Result
2019	Culture Club	Artist of the Year	Nominated

=== Creem Magazine Awards ===
Year	Nominee / work	Award	Result
1983	Themselves	Worst Group – No. 1	Won
1983	Colour by Numbers	Top Album – No. 19	Nominated

=== Goldene Europa ===
Year	Nominee / work	Award	Result
1983	Colour by Numbers	Best International Group	Won

=== Grammy Awards ===
Year	Nominee / work	Award	Result
1984	Culture Club	Best New Artist	Won
1984	"Do You Really Want to Hurt Me"	Best Pop Performance by a Duo or Group	Nominated

=== Ivor Novello Awards ===
Year	Nominee / work	Award	Result
1983	"Do You Really Want to Hurt Me"	Bestselling A-Side	Nominated
1984	"Karma Chameleon"	Best Pop Song	Won
1984	"Karma Chameleon"	Bestselling A-Side	Won
1984	"Karma Chameleon"	Most Performed Work	Nominated
1984	"Karma Chameleon"	International Hit of the Year	Nominated

=== Juno Awards ===
Year	Nominee / work	Award	Result
1984	Colour by Numbers	International Album of the Year	Nominated

=== MTV Video Music Awards ===
Year	Nominee / work	Award	Result
1985	"It's a Miracle"	Best Special Effects	Nominated
1985	"It's a Miracle"	Best Art Direction	Nominated

=== Q Awards ===
Year	Nominee / work	Award	Result
2006	"Karma Chameleon"	Q Classic Song Award	Won
2014	Culture Club	Q Idol	Won

=== Rockbjörnen ===
Year	Nominee / work	Award	Result
1983	Colour by Numbers	Best Foreign Album	Won

=== Smash Hits Poll Winners Party ===
Year	Nominee / work	Award	Result
1982	"Do You Really Want to Hurt Me?"	Best Single	Nominated
1982	Kissing to Be Clever	Best Album	Nominated
1982	Themselves	Most Promising New Act	Nominated
1982	Themselves	Best Group	Nominated
1983	Themselves	Best Group	Nominated
1983	Culture Club's "Colour by Numbers" Tour	Event of the Year	Nominated
1983	Culture Club making No. 1 with "Karma Chameleon"	Event of the Year	Nominated
1983	"Karma Chameleon"	Best Single	Nominated
1983	"Karma Chameleon"	Best Video	Nominated
1983	Colour by Numbers	Best Album	Nominated
1984	Waking Up with the House on Fire	Best Album	Nominated
1984	"The War Song"	Best Single	Nominated
1984	"The War Song"	Best Video	Nominated
1984	Themselves	Best Group	Nominated
1985	Themselves	Worst Group	Nominated

=== Rock and Roll Hall of Fame ===
Year	Nominated work	Category	Result	Notes
1999	"Time (Clock of the Heart)"	500 Songs That Shaped Rock and Roll	Won	No. 107

=== Variety Club of Great Britain Awards ===
Year	Nominee / work	Award	Result
1985	The War Song	Best Recording Artist	Won

== Musical style and development ==
Culture Club are primarily a pop group, belonging to the British new pop and New Romantic movements of the early 1980s. They have also been described as new wave, combining it with American soul with Jamaican reggae and other styles such as calypso, salsa, and country.

Philadelphia Daily News described Culture Club as a hot new rock act, while William K Knoedelseder Jr from Los Angeles Times said about the group, "Boy George of Culture Club, a rock group MTV helped make popular", adding that, "There's some debate in the record industry about MTV's ability to directly increase record sales across the board but there's no doubt that the channel has been responsible for exposing such rock artists as Def Leppard, Duran Duran and Men at Work to a national audience..."

In the 1980s, Boy George said about the music style of his band Culture Club, "We play rock 'n' roll and I love rock 'n' roll music but I don't like the lifestyle. I don't like people tipping beer over their heads.... I just hate rock 'n' roll in that way. It's disgusting and boring. I look at what we're doing as very intelligent."

Stephen Holden, music critic for The New York Times, said in his article Rock: British Culture Club, that "Culture Club blends soul, rock, funk, reggae and salsa into a music that programmatically reconciles white, black and Latin styles", adding that, "Mr. O'Dowd made the group's best songs – the Motown-flavoured 'Do You Really Want to Hurt Me' and the Latin-inflected dance tune 'I'll Tumble 4 Ya' – shine like jewels."

Star-News considered Culture Club as a 'new rock' band of the 1980s; the newspaper said "Now you see the more rhythm-oriented, 'new rock of the 80s,' like Culture Club and the Eurythmics, fitting in more easily with urban contemporary formats."

Stephen Thomas Erlewine, senior editor for AllMusic, described specifically Culture Club as a new wave band and generically as the most successful pop/rock group in America and England during the 1980s, adding that, "By 1986, the group had broken up, leaving behind several singles that rank as classics of the new wave era."

The music of Culture Club is described by George as, "The aim is to be creatively fluid to make everything we do a little different. We want to be a bridge between white rock and black soul", adding that, "I want Culture Club to represent all peoples and minorities".

The band were part of the Second British Invasion of the 1980s in the United States, as R. Serge Denisoff and William L. Schurk said in their book Tarnished Gold: The Record Industry Revisited, "Here comes the rock and roll of 1984. The invaders were a mixed bunch led by Culture Club, whose sound has been described as 'recycled Smokey Robinson' or 'torchy American schmaltz and classic Motown'", adding that, "Boy George's drag-queen appearance made the group a natural for the visual demands of cable television".

In her book Magazines for Children: A Guide for Parents, Teachers, and Librarians, author Selma K. Richardson said that Culture Club's music is soft rock that contains "enough soul and new wave elements to cover almost all audiences."

== Members ==
=== Principal members ===
- Boy George (George O'Dowd) – lead vocals, tambourine (1981–1986, 1998–2002, 2011–present)
- Mikey Craig – bass, backing vocals, occasional keyboards (1981–1986, 1998–2002, 2006, 2011–present)
- Roy Hay – guitars, backing vocals, keyboards (1981–1986, 1998–2002, 2011–present)

==== Touring/session members ====
- Darren Lewis – keyboards, percussion (2011–present)
- Meryl-Anne Evanson – drums, backing vocals, percussion (2021–present)

=== Former members ===
- Jon Moss – drums, backing vocals, percussion (1981–1986, 1998–2002, 2006, 2011–2021) (main)
- Phil Pickett – keyboards, backing vocals (1982–1986) (session/touring)
- Helen Terry - backing vocals (1982–1986) (session/touring)
- Darius Zickus – keyboards (1998–2002) (touring)
- Sam Butcher – lead vocals (2006) (touring)
- Steve Honest – pedal steel (1999–2001) (session/touring)

== Discography ==
- Kissing to Be Clever (1982)
- Colour by Numbers (1983)
- Waking Up with the House on Fire (1984)
- From Luxury to Heartache (1986)
- Don't Mind If I Do (1999)
- Life (2018)

== Citations ==
=== Songbooks ===
- Kissing to Be Clever (including "Time (Clock of the Heart)" – 1982), London & Suffolk, West Central Printing Co. Ltd., distr. Music Sales Ltd.
- Colour by Numbers (1983), London & Suffolk, West Central Printing Co. Ltd., distr. Music Sales Ltd.
- Waking Up with the House on Fire (1984), London & Suffolk, West Central Printing Co. Ltd., distr. Music Sales Ltd.
- From Luxury to Heartache (1986), Virgin Music (Publishers) Ltd., distr. IMP-International Music Publications, Essex, England
- Culture Club (10 of their best songs – 1987), Virgin Music (Publishers) Ltd., distr. IMP-International Music Publications, Essex, England

N.B.: Each of the first four songbooks includes a detailed official biography, which is each time updated: this way, such songbooks, corresponding to the band's first four albums, chronicle the early official biography of Culture Club, from 1982 to 1986.
