= Roy Hay (musician) =

English musician

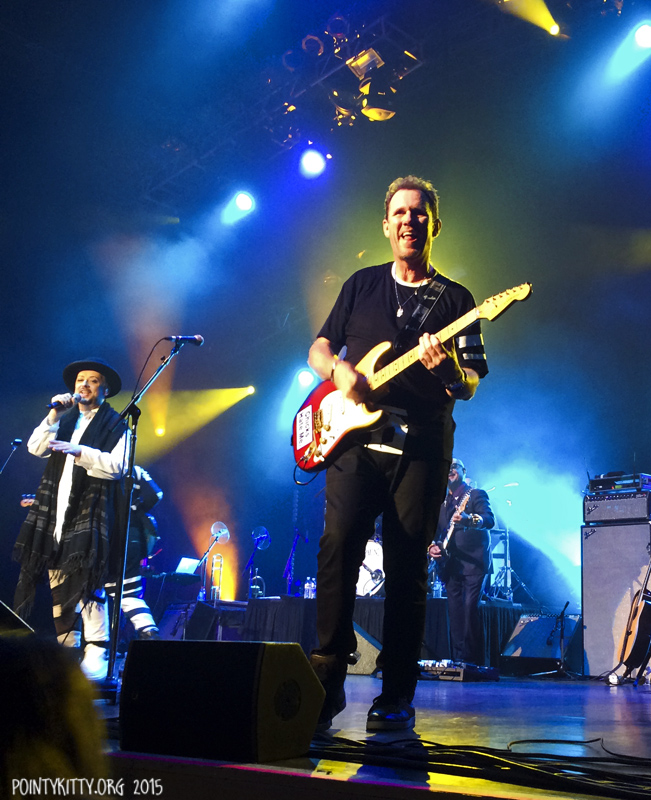
- Hay performing in September 2015

Background information
- Born: Roy Ernest Hay; 12 August 1961 (age 64); Southend, Essex, England
- Occupations: Singer; songwriter; musician
- Instruments: Vocals; guitar; keyboards
- Spouse: Georgie Hay

Roy Ernest Hay (born 12 August 1961) is an English musician who is the guitarist and keyboardist of the band Culture Club.

== Biography ==
Before his involvement with Culture Club, Hay was a hairdresser in his native Essex.

Hay became the guitarist and keyboardist of the band Culture Club in 1981. Culture Club's debut album, Kissing to Be Clever (UK No. 5, US No. 14), was released in 1982. The single "Do You Really Want to Hurt Me" became an international hit, reaching No. 1 in multiple countries around the world, plus top ten in several more countries (US No. 2). It was followed by the Top 5 hit "Time" in the US and UK, and "I'll Tumble 4 Ya" which reached US No. 9. This gave Culture Club the distinction of being the first group since the Beatles to have three Top 10 hits in the US from a debut album.

Their next album, Colour By Numbers, was an enormous success, topping the UK charts and reaching No. 2 in the US. The single "Church of the Poison Mind" became a Top 10 hit, and "Karma Chameleon" was an international hit, peaking at No. 1 in 16 countries, and the top ten in additional countries. In the US it hit No. 1, where it stayed for three weeks. It was the best-selling single of 1983 in the United Kingdom, where it spent six weeks at No. 1. "Victims" and "It's a Miracle" were further Top 5 UK hits, while "Miss Me Blind" reached the Top 5 in the US.

The group disbanded in 1986, but they reunited in 1998 to record a new album. In a Rolling Stone interview, Hay described the years apart as a healing process. "There was obviously a bit of a healing process that needed to happen between Jon [Moss] and George. They hadn't really spoken to each other in quite a while". The description of the tour was "Older and wiser...We've all been through some good and bad times since the band. I think we've all grown up a bit".

It was during Culture Club's beginnings that Hay met Alison Green. The two married in 1982.

According to the "Culture Club" episode the VH-1 series Behind the Music, Hay assisted Boy George in giving up heroin. The singer suffered the painful withdrawal symptoms closely attended by Hay in his Essex home.

Following Culture Club, Hay formed another band, called This Way Up, with singer Robinson Reid. In 1987, they released three singles: "Tell Me Why", "If I Can't Have You" and "Louise". An album, Feelin' Good About It, was released in some European countries and in Japan in 1987. Of those records, "Tell Me Why" charted, for one week at number 72 on the UK Singles Chart.

== Literature ==
- International Who's Who of Popular Music, Europa Publications Limited, London, p. 224, ISBN 1857431618
