= Jon Moss =

English drummer (born 1957)

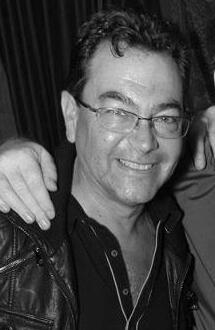
- Moss on "Spring Heeled Jack" for a blues night jamming session, 2011

Background information
- Born: Jonathan Aubrey Moss; 11 September 1957 (age 69); Wandsworth, South London, England
- Genres: Punk rock; new wave; pop rock
- Occupation: Drummer
- Years active: 1976–present
- Formerly of: Culture Club; the Nips; the Damned; Adam and the Ants

Jonathan Aubrey Moss (born 11 September 1957) is an English drummer, best known as a member of the 1980s pop group Culture Club. He has also played with other bands, including London, the Nips, the Damned and Adam and the Ants.

== Early life ==
At Highgate School, Moss developed a fascination for sports, especially boxing, but he did not want a professional sporting career. It was also at Highgate that he formed his first band, Pig Williams, along with his friend Nick Feldman (who would later co-found Wang Chung). Together they performed at several school events. After finishing high school, Jon held various jobs, including working at his father's clothing store, as a cake salesman and as a sound engineer at Marquee Studios. In spite of regarding a college education as a waste of time, he briefly considered the idea of studying Greek at the University of Cambridge.

== Career ==
=== Beginning (1976–1980) ===
Alongside his friend Riff Regan, Moss joined the punk band London in 1976, after being tried out as a drummer with the Clash; later, he said "The mix of personalities didn't work. Their attitudes were too different to mine." London released a single entitled "Everyone's a Winner", and were managed by Simon Napier-Bell. Eventually they recorded two singles, a four-track EP and an album for MCA Records in 1977. Following this, Moss went on tour with established punk group the Stranglers, and the band got a record deal.

Soon afterward, Moss began drumming with the Damned, replacing Rat Scabies. He made the decision to join them after he was injured in a car crash on New Year's Eve 1977, suffering injuries that led to a week's hospital stay. Along with the Damned's guitarist, Lu Edmonds, he left the Damned to form new wave band the Edge. After just over a year, the Edge broke up.

Moss played with Adam and the Ants on their third single "Cartrouble" and its B-side "Kick!". At the time, Moss was under contract with a group called Jane Aire & the Belvederes; therefore, he was credited on the original single under the pseudonym "Terry 1 & 2". On the 1983 CBS/Epic version of the Ants' 1979 album Dirk Wears White Sox and subsequent editions also including the two recordings, he is credited under his real name. In 1980, he played with the last incarnation of the Nips (formerly The Nipple Erectors).

=== Culture Club – early times (1981–1986) ===
Moss joined Culture Club after a phone call from the band's singer Boy George. Culture Club was in need of a drummer, and Boy George knew of Moss through an acquaintance. After rehearsing with the band, Moss decided to stay. When he became a member of the band—which was originally called Sex Gang Children—he suggested a name-change, being unhappy with the current name of the group. The band ultimately settled for Culture Club, drawing inspiration from the diversity of the group's members.

In 1985, while still performing with Culture Club, he produced some tracks for the band Woyeyeh.

=== Other works and Culture Club reunion (1987–2002) ===
After Culture Club broke up in 1986, Moss released a single entitled "Jump to It" with the group Heartbeat UK.

In 1989, under the name Rubberman, Moss released one white label record of an acid house instrumental track. Boy George used that backing track to create his own song, "After the Love".

During 1991 and 1992, Moss was involved in another group, Promised Land, with his schoolfriend Nick Feldman. The two released two singles, "Something in the Air" and "Circle in the Square".

=== Charities, B-side projects (2003–2010) ===
From 2003 to 2005, Moss joined several punk rock and rock bands, among them Fassbender, DanMingo and Dirth. In July 2005, he played drums on the charity single "People I Don't Know Are Trying to Kill Me", written by the journalist Neil McCormick, to help the families of the victims of the 7 July 2005 London bombings.

In 2006 Moss, Mikey Craig and Phil Pickett tried to launch Culture Club on a new tour with another lead singer, as George and Roy Hay had declined to tour. A UK tour was announced for December 2006, but was postponed to give the new line-up time to finish recording their album. Without official press statements, band manager Tony Gordon said in 2007 that the project was "on hold", while Moss stated that the project was shelved.

=== Culture Club – reunion (2011–2021) ===
Moss did not appear at Culture Club's concerts in Dubai and Sydney in December 2011, due to a back injury which required surgery. Despite rumours that the reunion project had been shelved, Boy George said in a March 2012 interview with Danny Baker on BBC Radio 5 that their new album would be released in 2013.

Meanwhile, Moss had been drumming with Mad Dog Bites, alongside Martin French (vocals), Godfrey Old (harmonica), Peter Noone (bass) and Conrad Blakemore (guitar).

In the Red Nose Day '13 at Whiteleys, Moss sang with the Rock Choir, helping them to raise funds for Comic Relief.

In 2014, Culture Club began recording a new album that was originally named Tribes. The Tribes sessions were recorded in Spain and documented in the film From Karma to Calamity which aired on BBC Four. In July 2018, it was announced that the sessions had been reworked as Life and that the album was to be released on 26 October 2018 and credited to "Boy George and Culture Club".

In early 2018, Moss formed pop band Ridiculous together with the Cross bassist Peter Noone and film score composer Erran Baron Cohen. The band's debut performance took place at The Dublin Castle, Camden, London.

Culture Club toured the US and Europe from June to December 2018 in support of their Life album, along with supporting acts the B-52s, Tom Bailey (formerly of Thompson Twins) and Belinda Carlisle (Europe dates only). Moss was originally part of the line-up, but was replaced by Garrison Brown.

In December 2019, Moss filed a writ at London's High Court naming the band trio as defendants. Moss' lawyers say he was told to "take a break" by manager Paul Kemsley; Moss demanded nearly £200,000 in missing payments and a share of profits. In 2023, the band trio agreed to end the dispute and pay Moss £1.75M.

Moss officially left Culture Club in May 2021.

== Personal life ==
Moss grew up with his brother David Moss, who went on to become an IT teacher at Stoke College independent school. Moss was born at Clapham Jewish Boys Home in South London and was raised Jewish. The band Culture Club was named after the fact that its members all had distinct cultural backgrounds, including Jamaican, English, and Jewish.

Moss has three children with his former wife, Barbara Savage.

Moss had an intimate relationship with Boy George during the height of Culture Club's popularity, although it was not public knowledge at the time. Their affair came to an end in 1986. The relationship was portrayed in Worried About the Boy, a drama film shown on BBC2.

Preceded by Dave Barbe	Adam and the Ants drummer 1980	Succeeded by Terry Lee Miall & Merrick
