= Mikey Craig =

English musician (born 1960)

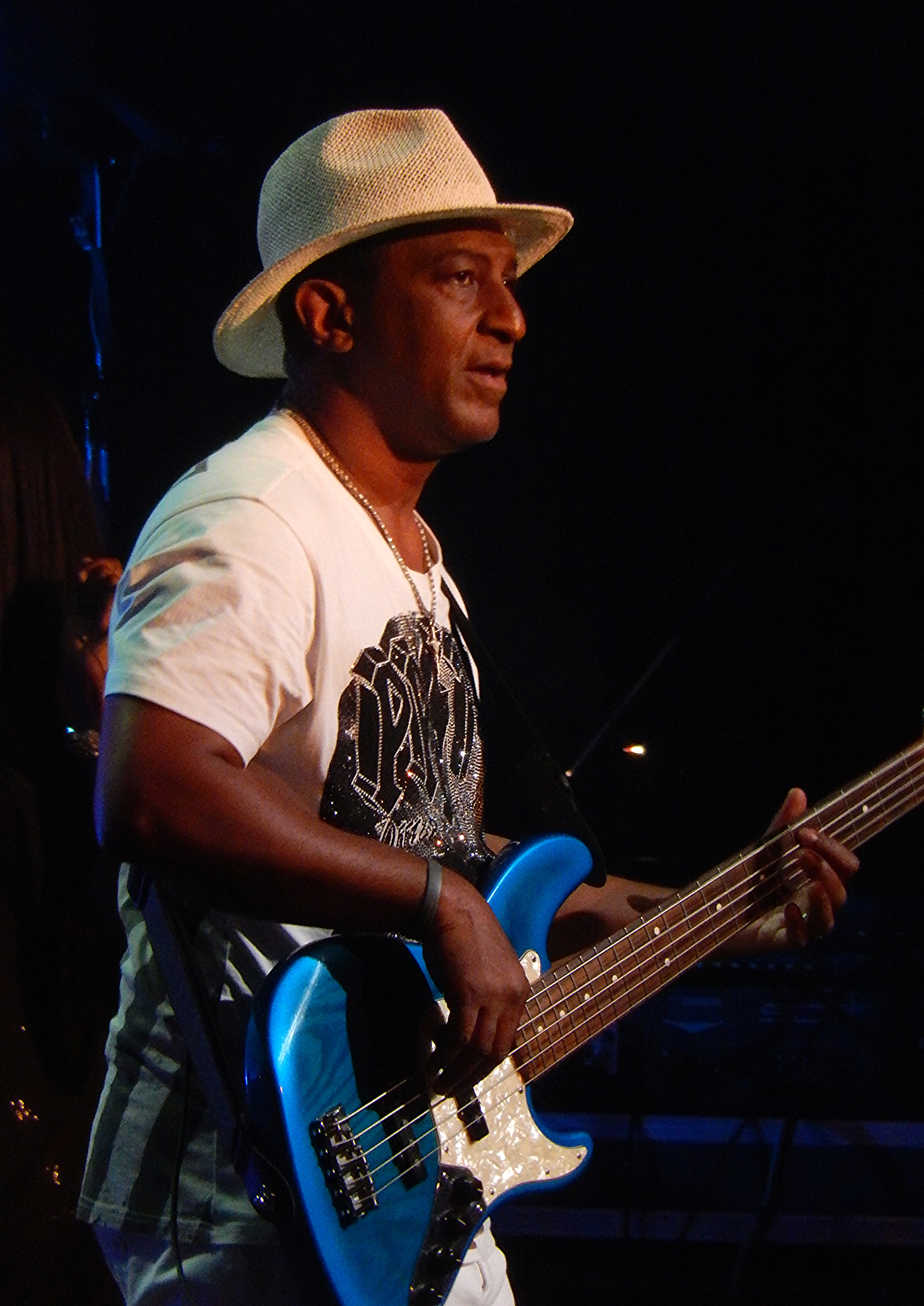
- Mikey Craig Culture Club

Background information
- Born: Michael Emile Craig; 15 February 1960 (age 66); London, England
- Occupations: Musician, executive producer, composer
- Instruments: Bass, vocals
- Member of: Culture Club

Michael Emile Craig (born 15 February 1960) is a British musician and DJ best known as the bassist of the pop/soul/new wave band Culture Club.

Craig started the group Culture Club, which became one of the most successful bands of the 1980s, selling millions of albums. In 1988, he released a solo single entitled "I'm a Believer", which failed to make an impact.

Craig was an executive producer in the mid-1990s for his own dance label, SLAMM records.

Craig continues to tour with Culture Club and its original members Boy George and Roy Hay, and formerly Jon Moss who departed from the group in 2021. Craig has also occasionally performed with Kid Creole and the Coconuts during their UK shows.

== Personal life ==
Craig went to St Clement Danes School in DuCane Road, Hammersmith. Craig had two children with Cleo Scott, daughter of the author and political campaigner Erin Pizzey: son Keita, born in 1977, and daughter Amber, born eighteen months later. Keita had a diagnosis of schizophrenia and committed suicide in Wandsworth Prison in 2000. Craig ended his relationship with Cleo Scott shortly after Culture Club's rise to fame in 1982. He is now married to an Italian woman named Lilli, and they have three sons: Milo Emile, footballer Paco Gigi, and Geo Luca.
