= List of Billboard Hot 100 top-ten singles in 1984 =

This is a list of singles that have peaked in the Top 10 of the Billboard Hot 100 during 1984.

A total of 99 singles hit the top-ten, including 20 number one songs and 7 number-two peaked songs.

Lionel Richie scored five top ten hits during the year with "All Night Long (All Night)", "Running with the Night", "Hello", "Stuck on You", and "Penny Lover", the most among all other artists.

== Top-ten singles ==
- (#) – 1984 Year-end top 10 single position and rank

List of Billboard Hot 100 top ten singles which peaked in 1984
Top ten entry date	Single	Artist(s)	Peak	Peak date	Weeks in top ten
Singles from 1983
December 17	"Owner of a Lonely Heart" (#8)	Yes	1	January 21	10
December 17	"Twist of Fate"	Olivia Newton-John	5	January 7	7
December 24	"Break My Stride"	Matthew Wilder	5	January 21	7
Singles from 1984
January 7	"Talking in Your Sleep"	The Romantics	3	January 28	7
January 7	"I Guess That's Why They Call It the Blues"	Elton John	4	January 28	6
January 14	"Karma Chameleon" (#10)	Culture Club	1	February 4	9
January 14	"Running with the Night"	Lionel Richie	7	February 4	5
January 21	"Joanna"	Kool & the Gang	2	February 11	6
January 28	"That's All"	Genesis	6	February 11	4
February 4	"Think of Laura"	Christopher Cross	9	February 4	2
February 4	"Pink Houses"	John Cougar Mellencamp	8	February 11	2
February 11	"Jump" (#6)	Van Halen	1	February 25	10
February 18	"99 Luftballons/99 Red Balloons"	Nena	2	March 3	6
February 18	"Thriller"	Michael Jackson	4	March 3	5
February 18	"Girls Just Want to Have Fun"	Cyndi Lauper	2	March 10	8
February 18	"Let the Music Play"	Shannon	8	February 25	3
February 25	"Nobody Told Me"	John Lennon	5	March 3	4
February 25	"Wrapped Around Your Finger"	The Police	8	March 3	2
February 25	"An Innocent Man"	Billy Joel	10	February 25	1
March 3	"Somebody's Watching Me"	Rockwell	2	March 24	8
March 3	"I Want a New Drug"	Huey Lewis and the News	6	March 24	5
March 10	"Here Comes the Rain Again"	Eurythmics	4	March 31	7
March 10	"Footloose" (#4)	Kenny Loggins	1	March 31	11
March 17	"New Moon on Monday"	Duran Duran	10	March 17	1
March 24	"Automatic"	The Pointer Sisters	5	April 14	6
March 24	"Adult Education"	Hall & Oates	8	April 7	4
March 24	"Got a Hold on Me"	Christine McVie	10	March 24	1
March 31	"Against All Odds (Take a Look at Me Now)" (#5)	Phil Collins	1	April 21	10
March 31	"Miss Me Blind"	Culture Club	5	April 21	6
April 7	"Hello" (#7)	Lionel Richie	1	May 12	10
April 14	"Hold Me Now"	Thompson Twins	3	May 5	7
April 21	"Love Somebody"	Rick Springfield	5	May 5	5
April 21	"They Don't Know"	Tracey Ullman	8	April 28	3
April 28	"You Might Think"	The Cars	7	April 28	4
April 28	"To All the Girls I've Loved Before"	Julio Iglesias and Willie Nelson	5	May 19	6
May 5	"Let's Hear It for the Boy"	Deniece Williams	1	May 26	9
May 12	"Time After Time"	Cyndi Lauper	1	June 9	9
May 12	"Oh Sherrie"	Steve Perry	3	June 9	7
May 26	"The Reflex"	Duran Duran	1	June 23	8
May 26	"Sister Christian"	Night Ranger	5	June 9	4
May 26	"Breakdance"	Irene Cara	8	June 9	3
June 2	"The Heart of Rock & Roll"	Huey Lewis and the News	6	June 9	7
June 9	"Self Control"	Laura Branigan	4	June 30	6
June 9	"Jump (For My Love)"	The Pointer Sisters	3	July 7	8
June 16	"Dancing in the Dark"	Bruce Springsteen	2	June 30	9
June 16	"Borderline"	Madonna	10	June 16	1
June 23	"When Doves Cry" (#1)	Prince	1	July 7	11
June 23	"Eyes Without a Face"	Billy Idol	4	July 14	6
June 30	"Almost Paradise...Love Theme from Footloose"	Mike Reno and Ann Wilson	7	July 14	4
July 7	"Legs"	ZZ Top	8	July 21	4
July 14	"Ghostbusters" (#9)	Ray Parker Jr.	1	August 11	10
July 21	"State of Shock"	The Jacksons	3	August 4	6
July 21	"Sad Songs (Say So Much)"	Elton John	5	August 11	5
July 21	"Infatuation"	Rod Stewart	6	July 28	4
July 28	"What's Love Got to Do with It" (#2)	Tina Turner	1	September 1	10
August 4	"Stuck on You"	Lionel Richie	3	August 25	7
August 4	"Breakin'... There's No Stopping Us"	Ollie & Jerry	9	August 4	1
August 4	"I Can Dream About You"	Dan Hartman	6	August 18	4
August 11	"Sunglasses at Night"	Corey Hart	7	September 1	5
August 18	"Missing You"	John Waite	1	September 22	9
August 18	"If Ever You're in My Arms Again"	Peabo Bryson	10	August 18	3
August 25	"She Bop"	Cyndi Lauper	3	September 8	8
September 1	"Let's Go Crazy"	Prince and the Revolution	1	September 29	9
September 1	"If This Is It"	Huey Lewis and the News	6	September 15	4
September 8	"The Warrior"	Scandal featuring Patty Smyth	7	September 22	5
September 8	"Drive"	The Cars	3	September 29	7
September 15	"The Glamorous Life"	Sheila E.	7	October 6	5
September 22	"I Just Called to Say I Love You"	Stevie Wonder	1	October 13	10
September 22	"Cruel Summer"	Bananarama	9	September 29	2
September 29	"Cover Me"	Bruce Springsteen	7	October 20	4
October 6	"Hard Habit to Break"	Chicago	3	October 20	6
October 6	"Lucky Star"	Madonna	4	October 20	5
October 13	"Caribbean Queen (No More Love on the Run)"	Billy Ocean	1	November 3	7
October 20	"On the Dark Side"	John Cafferty and the Beaver Brown Band	7	October 27	3
October 20	"Purple Rain"	Prince and the Revolution	2	November 17	7
October 20	"I'm So Excited"	The Pointer Sisters	9	October 27	2
October 27	"Wake Me Up Before You Go-Go"	Wham!	1	November 17	8
October 27	"Some Guys Have All the Luck"	Rod Stewart	10	October 27	1
November 3	"Blue Jean"	David Bowie	8	November 3	2
November 3	"Better Be Good to Me"	Tina Turner	5	November 24	5
November 3	"I Feel for You"	Chaka Khan	3	November 24	9
November 10	"Out of Touch"	Hall & Oates	1	December 8	9
November 10	"Desert Moon"	Dennis DeYoung	10	November 10	1
November 17	"Strut"	Sheena Easton	7	November 24	3
November 17	"All Through the Night"	Cyndi Lauper	5	December 8	5
November 17	"Penny Lover"	Lionel Richie	8	December 1	4
December 1	"The Wild Boys"	Duran Duran	2	December 15	8
December 1	"No More Lonely Nights"	Paul McCartney	6	December 8	5
December 15	"Like a Virgin"	Madonna	1	December 22	9

=== 1983 peaks ===
List of Billboard Hot 100 top ten singles in 1984 which peaked in 1983
Top ten entry date	Single	Artist(s)	Peak	Peak date	Weeks in top ten
October 15	"All Night Long (All Night)"	Lionel Richie	1	November 12	13
November 5	"Say Say Say" (#3)	Paul McCartney and Michael Jackson	1	December 10	13
November 19	"Say It Isn't So"	Hall & Oates	2	December 17	10
December 10	"Union of the Snake"	Duran Duran	3	December 24	6
December 24	"Undercover of the Night"	The Rolling Stones	9	December 24	3

=== 1985 peaks ===
List of Billboard Hot 100 top ten singles in 1984 which peaked in 1985
Top ten entry date	Single	Artist(s)	Peak	Peak date	Weeks in top ten
December 8	"We Belong"	Pat Benatar	5	January 5	7
December 8	"Cool It Now"	New Edition	4	January 5	6
December 8	"Sea of Love"	The Honeydrippers	3	January 5	6
December 22	"All I Need"	Jack Wagner	2	January 12	6
December 22	"Valotte"	Julian Lennon	9	January 12	4

== See also ==
- 1984 in music
- List of Billboard Hot 100 number ones of 1984
- Billboard Year-End Hot 100 singles of 1984
