= Billboard Year-End Hot Black Singles of 1984 =

American music chart

This is a list of Billboard magazine's Top Hot Black Singles of 1984.

No.	Title	Artist(s)
1	"When Doves Cry"	Prince
2	"If Only You Knew"	Patti LaBelle
3	"What's Love Got to Do with It"	Tina Turner
4	"She's Strange"	Cameo
5	"Time Will Reveal"	DeBarge
6	"Caribbean Queen (No More Love on the Run)"	Billy Ocean
7	"Hello"	Lionel Richie
8	"Joanna"	Kool & the Gang
9	"Let the Music Play"	Shannon
10	"Don't Look Any Further"	Dennis Edwards featuring Siedah Garrett
11	"Let's Hear It for the Boy"	Deniece Williams
12	"Somebody's Watching Me"	Rockwell
13	"You, Me and He"	Mtume
14	"Ghostbusters"	Ray Parker Jr.
15	"Lovelite"	O'Bryan
16	"Encore"	Cheryl Lynn
17	"Don't Waste Your Time"	Yarbrough and Peoples
18	"All Night Long (All Night)"	Lionel Richie
19	"Say Say Say"	Paul McCartney featuring Michael Jackson
20	"Taxi"	J. Blackfoot
21	"Somebody Else's Guy"	Jocelyn Brown
22	"Lady You Are"	One Way
23	"I Just Called to Say I Love You"	Stevie Wonder
24	"Freak Show on the Dance Floor"	Bar-Kays
25	"Jump (For My Love)"	The Pointer Sisters
26	"Love Has Finally Come at Last"	Bobby Womack featuring Patti LaBelle
27	"The Glamorous Life"	Sheila E.
28	"Automatic"	The Pointer Sisters
29	"The Last Time I Made Love"	Joyce Kennedy and Jeffrey Osborne
30	"Baby, I'm Hooked (Right into Your Love)"	Con Funk Shun
31	"Breakin'... There's No Stopping Us"	Ollie & Jerry
32	"Jam on It"	Newcleus
33	"Let's Go Crazy"	Prince and the Revolution
34	"Feels So Real (Won't Let Go)"	Patrice Rushen
35	"Joystick"	Dazz Band
36	"Let's Stay Together"	Tina Turner
37	"Stay with Me Tonight"	Jeffrey Osborne
38	"Shackles"	R. J.'s Latest Arrival
39	"Yah Mo B There"	James Ingram and Michael McDonald
40	"If Ever You're in My Arms Again"	Peabo Bryson
41	"Touch a Four Leaf Clover"	Atlantic Starr
42	"17"	Rick James
43	"White Horse"	Laid Back
44	"Running with the Night"	Lionel Richie
45	"Something's on Your Mind"	D Train
46	"You Get the Best from Me"	Alicia Myers
47	"State of Shock"	The Jacksons featuring Mick Jagger
48	"Just the Way You Like It"	The S.O.S. Band
49	"I Feel for You"	Chaka Khan
50	"Dynamite"	Jermaine Jackson

== See also ==
- 1984 in music
- Billboard Year-End Hot 100 singles of 1984
- List of Hot Black Singles number ones of 1984
