= List of Hot Black Singles number ones of 1984 =

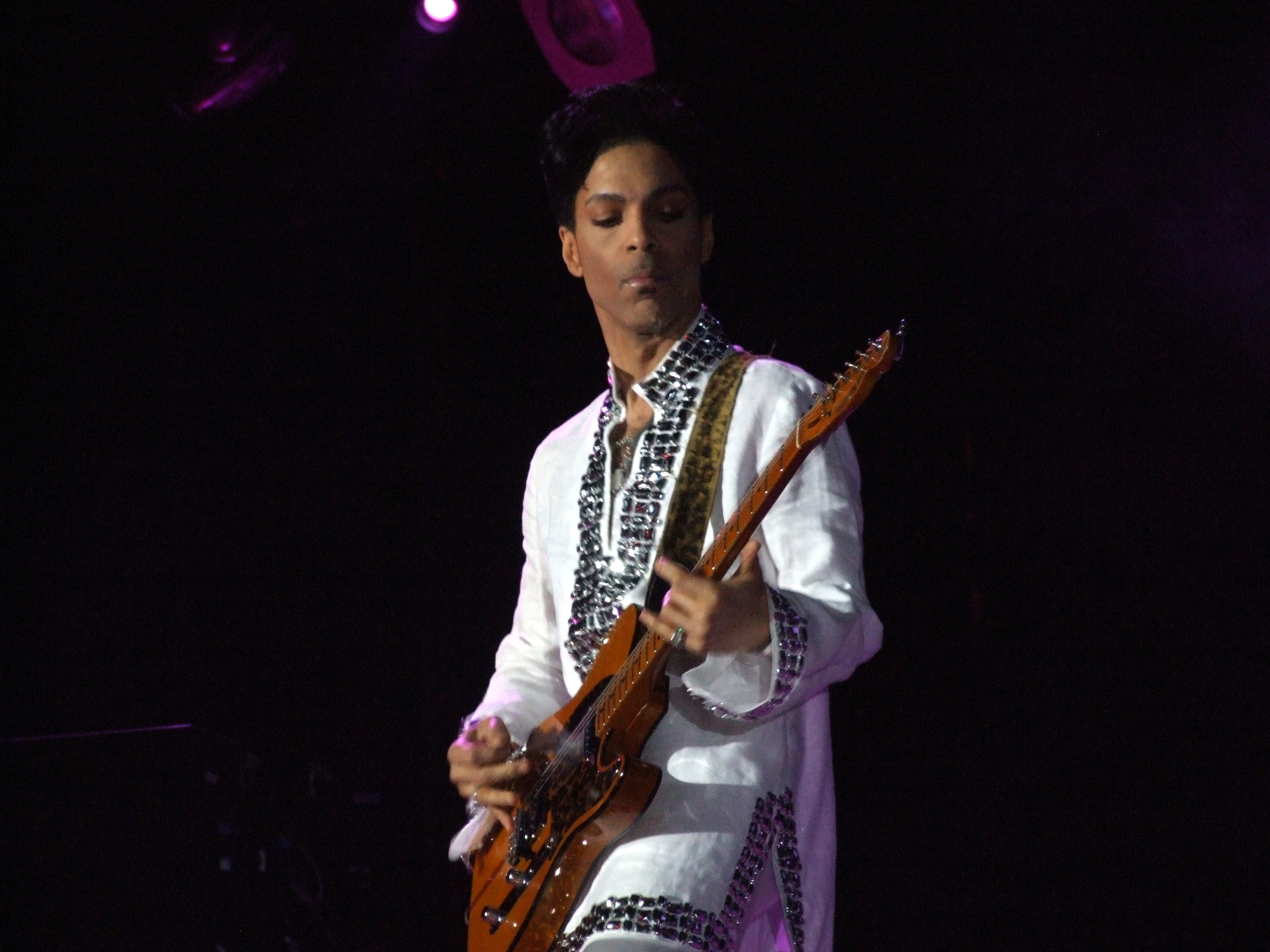
Prince had the year's longest-running number one with "When Doves Cry".

Billboard published a weekly chart in 1984 ranking the top-performing singles in the United States in African American-oriented genres; the chart has undergone various name changes over the decades to reflect the evolution of black music and has been published as Hot R&B/Hip-Hop Songs since 2005. In 1984, it was published under the title Black Singles through the issue dated October 13 and Hot Black Singles thereafter, and 19 different singles reached number one.

In the issue of Billboard dated January 7, "Time Will Reveal" by DeBarge was at number one, the final week of a five-week run in the top spot. The year's longest-running number one was "When Doves Cry" by Prince, which spent eight weeks in the top spot between June and August. Prince returned to number one in October with "Let's Go Crazy", on which his backing band the Revolution was also credited; he was the only act with more than one number one during the year. "When Doves Cry" has been included on lists of the greatest songs of all time, including the Rock and Roll Hall of Fame's list of 500 Songs that Shaped Rock and Roll. Both songs also topped Billboard's pop chart, the Hot 100, as did five more of 1984's Black Singles number ones: "Hello" by Lionel Richie, "Let's Hear It for the Boy" by Deniece Williams, "Ghostbusters" by Ray Parker Jr., "Caribbean Queen (No More Love on the Run)" by Billy Ocean, and "I Just Called to Say I Love You" by Stevie Wonder.

A number of acts topped the black singles chart in 1984 for the first time. Rockwell gained his first chart-topper in March with his debut single "Somebody's Watching Me", which featured uncredited guest vocals by one of the most successful recording artists of all time, Michael Jackson. It was followed into the top spot by "She's Strange" by Cameo, the first number one for the band, which had charted regularly since 1977. In June, O'Bryan achieved the first chart-topper of his career with "Lovelite". "Caribbean Queen" became Ocean's first number one in September, and in December "Solid" gave Ashford & Simpson their first chart-topper, more than a decade after their first chart entry. The duo was replaced atop the chart by Midnight Star with its first number one, "Operator", which went on to be the final chart-topper of 1984.

== Chart history ==
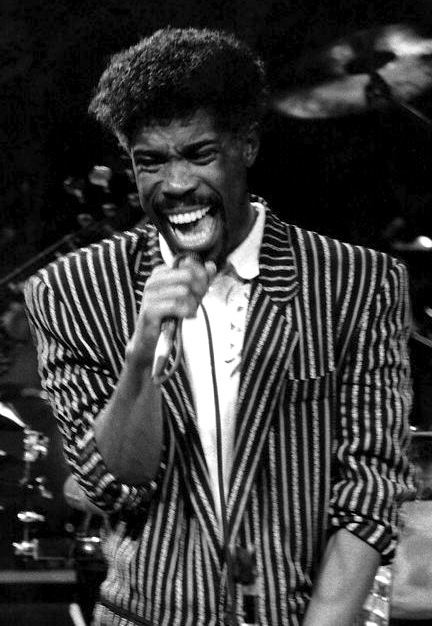
"Caribbean Queen (No More Love on the Run)" was a crossover success for Billy Ocean.

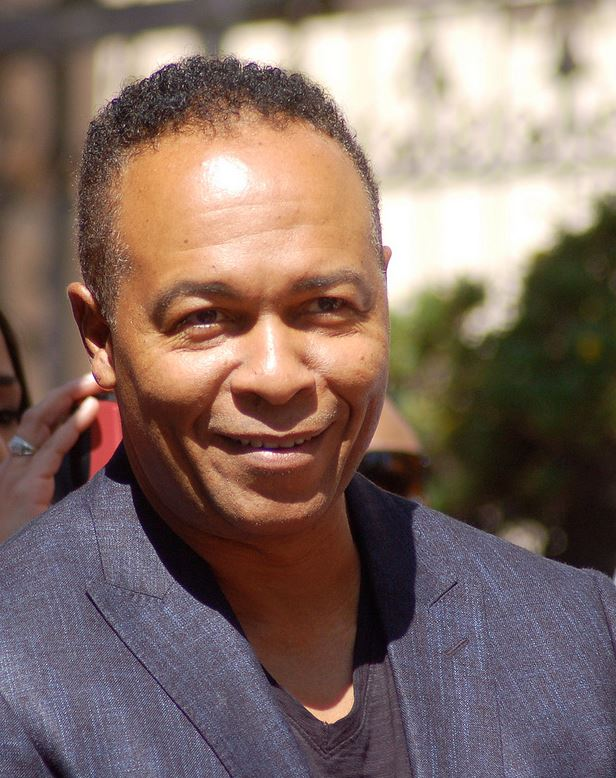
Ray Parker Jr. topped the chart with "Ghostbusters", the theme song from the film of the same name.

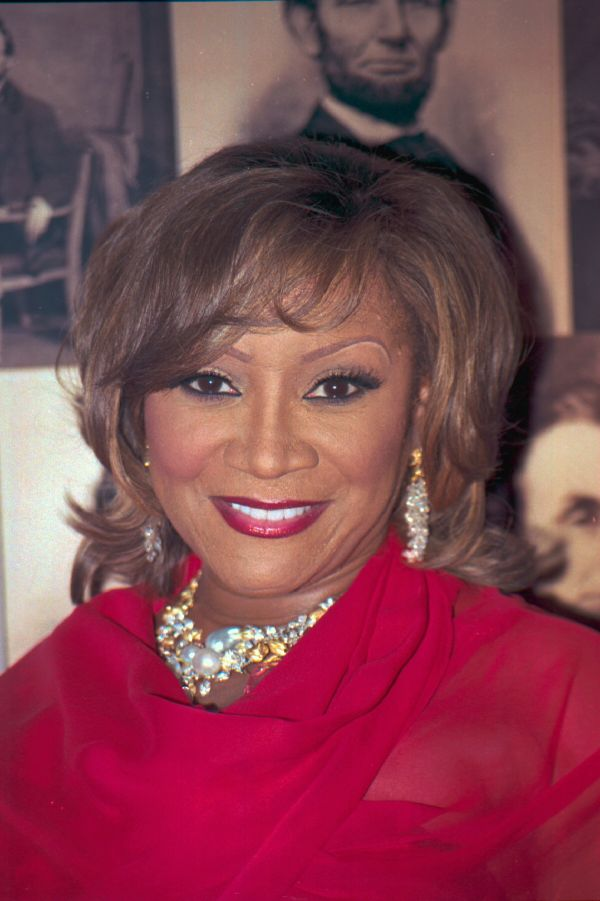
Patti LaBelle reached number one with "If Only You Knew".

Key
†	Indicates number 1 on Billboard's year-end black singles chart

Chart history
Issue date	Title	Artist(s)	Ref.
January 7	"Time Will Reveal"	DeBarge	
January 14	"Joanna"	Kool & the Gang	
January 21	"Joanna"	Kool & the Gang	
January 28	"If Only You Knew"	Patti LaBelle	
February 4	"If Only You Knew"	Patti LaBelle	
February 11	"If Only You Knew"	Patti LaBelle	
February 18	"If Only You Knew"	Patti LaBelle	
February 25	"Encore"	Cheryl Lynn	
March 3	"Somebody's Watching Me"	Rockwell	
March 10	"Somebody's Watching Me"	Rockwell	
March 17	"Somebody's Watching Me"	Rockwell	
March 24	"Somebody's Watching Me"	Rockwell	
March 31	"Somebody's Watching Me"	Rockwell	
April 7	"She's Strange"	Cameo	
April 14	"She's Strange"	Cameo	
April 21	"She's Strange"	Cameo	
April 28	"She's Strange"	Cameo	
May 5	"Hello"	Lionel Richie	
May 12	"Hello"	Lionel Richie	
May 19	"Hello"	Lionel Richie	
May 26	"Don't Waste Your Time"	Yarbrough and Peoples	
June 2	"Let's Hear It for the Boy"	Deniece Williams	
June 9	"Let's Hear It for the Boy"	Deniece Williams	
June 16	"Let's Hear It for the Boy"	Deniece Williams	
June 23	"Lovelite"	O'Bryan	
June 30	"When Doves Cry" †	Prince	
July 7	"When Doves Cry" †	Prince	
July 14	"When Doves Cry" †	Prince	
July 21	"When Doves Cry" †	Prince	
July 28	"When Doves Cry" †	Prince	
August 4	"When Doves Cry" †	Prince	
August 11	"When Doves Cry" †	Prince	
August 18	"When Doves Cry" †	Prince	
August 25	"Ghostbusters"	Ray Parker Jr.	
September 1	"Ghostbusters"	Ray Parker Jr.	
September 8	"Caribbean Queen (No More Love on the Run)"	Billy Ocean	
September 15	"Caribbean Queen (No More Love on the Run)"	Billy Ocean	
September 22	"Caribbean Queen (No More Love on the Run)"	Billy Ocean	
September 29	"Caribbean Queen (No More Love on the Run)"	Billy Ocean	
October 6	"Let's Go Crazy"	Prince and the Revolution	
October 13	"I Just Called to Say I Love You"	Stevie Wonder	
October 20	"I Just Called to Say I Love You"	Stevie Wonder	
October 27	"I Just Called to Say I Love You"	Stevie Wonder	
November 3	"I Feel For You"	Chaka Khan	
November 10	"I Feel For You"	Chaka Khan	
November 17	"I Feel For You"	Chaka Khan	
November 24	"Cool It Now"	New Edition	
December 1	"Solid"	Ashford & Simpson	
December 8	"Solid"	Ashford & Simpson	
December 15	"Solid"	Ashford & Simpson	
December 22	"Operator"	Midnight Star	
December 29	"Operator"	Midnight Star	

== See also ==
- 1984 in music
- Billboard Year-End Hot Black Singles of 1984
- List of Billboard Hot 100 number ones of 1984
