= Billboard Year-End Hot 100 singles of 1984 =

Ranking of recorded music

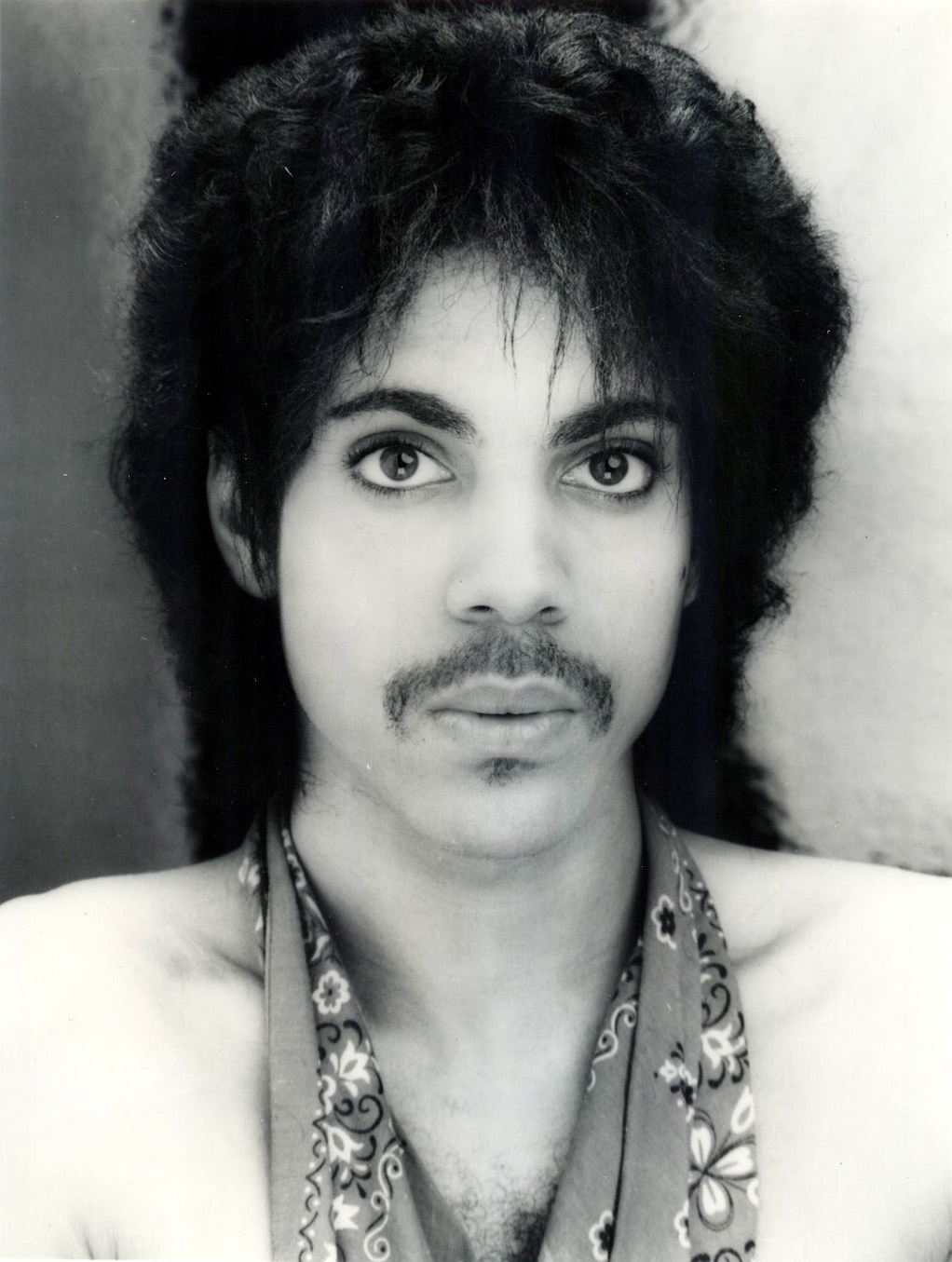
Prince (depicted here in 1980) had two songs on the Year-End Hot 100, "When Doves Cry", the number one hit of the year, and "Let's Go Crazy" at number 21.

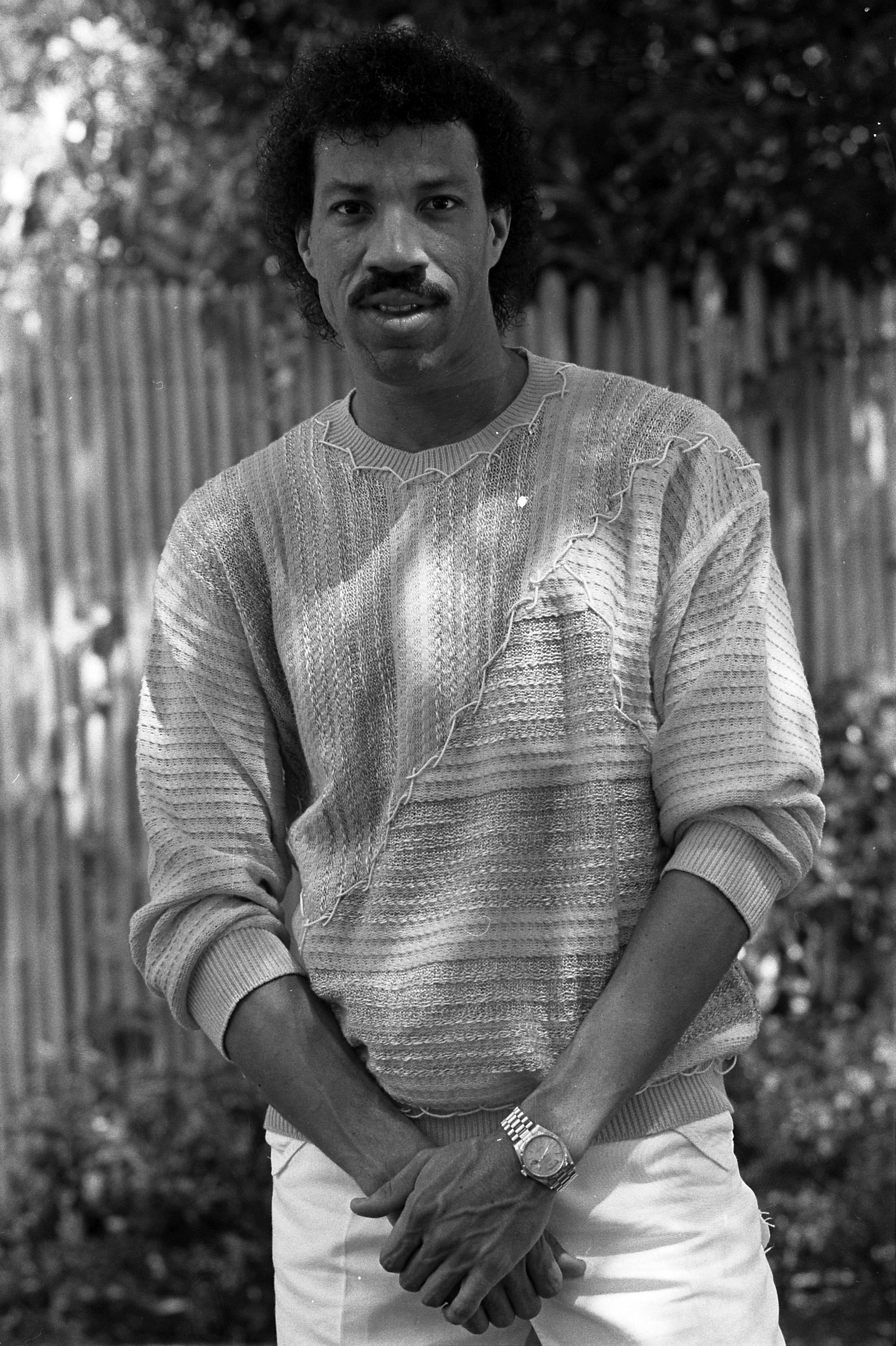
Lionel Richie (depicted here in 1984) had four songs on the Year-End Hot 100, the most of any artist in 1984.

This is a list of Billboard magazine's Top Hot 100 songs of 1984.

No.	Title	Artist(s)
1	"When Doves Cry"	Prince
2	"What's Love Got to Do with It"	Tina Turner
3	"Say, Say, Say"	Paul McCartney and Michael Jackson
4	"Footloose"	Kenny Loggins
5	"Against All Odds (Take a Look at Me Now)"	Phil Collins
6	"Jump"	Van Halen
7	"Hello"	Lionel Richie
8	"Owner of a Lonely Heart"	Yes
9	"Ghostbusters"	Ray Parker Jr.
10	"Karma Chameleon"	Culture Club
11	"Missing You"	John Waite
12	"All Night Long (All Night)"	Lionel Richie
13	"Let's Hear It for the Boy"	Deniece Williams
14	"Dancing in the Dark"	Bruce Springsteen
15	"Girls Just Want to Have Fun"	Cyndi Lauper
16	"The Reflex"	Duran Duran
17	"Time After Time"	Cyndi Lauper
18	"Jump (For My Love)"	The Pointer Sisters
19	"Talking in Your Sleep"	The Romantics
20	"Self Control"	Laura Branigan
21	"Let's Go Crazy"	Prince & the Revolution
22	"Say It Isn't So"	Daryl Hall & John Oates
23	"Hold Me Now"	Thompson Twins
24	"Joanna"	Kool & the Gang
25	"I Just Called to Say I Love You"	Stevie Wonder
26	"Somebody's Watching Me"	Rockwell
27	"Break My Stride"	Matthew Wilder
28	"99 Luftballons"	Nena
29	"I Can Dream About You"	Dan Hartman
30	"The Glamorous Life"	Sheila E.
31	"Oh Sherrie"	Steve Perry
32	"Stuck on You"	Lionel Richie
33	"I Guess That's Why They Call It the Blues"	Elton John
34	"She Bop"	Cyndi Lauper
35	"Borderline"	Madonna
36	"Sunglasses at Night"	Corey Hart
37	"Eyes Without a Face"	Billy Idol
38	"Here Comes the Rain Again"	Eurythmics
39	"Uptown Girl"	Billy Joel
40	"Sister Christian"	Night Ranger
41	"Drive"	The Cars
42	"Twist of Fate"	Olivia Newton-John
43	"Union of the Snake"	Duran Duran
44	"The Heart of Rock & Roll"	Huey Lewis and the News
45	"Hard Habit to Break"	Chicago
46	"The Warrior"	Scandal
47	"If Ever You're in My Arms Again"	Peabo Bryson
48	"Automatic"	The Pointer Sisters
49	"Let the Music Play"	Shannon
50	"To All the Girls I've Loved Before"	Julio Iglesias and Willie Nelson
51	"Caribbean Queen (No More Love on the Run)"	Billy Ocean
52	"That's All"	Genesis
53	"Running with the Night"	Lionel Richie
54	"Sad Songs (Say So Much)"	Elton John
55	"I Want a New Drug"	Huey Lewis and the News
56	"Islands in the Stream"	Kenny Rogers and Dolly Parton
57	"Love Is a Battlefield"	Pat Benatar
58	"Infatuation"	Rod Stewart
59	"Almost Paradise"	Mike Reno and Ann Wilson
60	"Legs"	ZZ Top
61	"State of Shock"	The Jacksons
62	"Love Somebody"	Rick Springfield
63	"Miss Me Blind"	Culture Club
64	"If This Is It"	Huey Lewis and the News
65	"You Might Think"	The Cars
66	"Lucky Star"	Madonna
67	"Cover Me"	Bruce Springsteen
68	"Cum on Feel the Noize"	Quiet Riot
69	"Breakdance"	Irene Cara
70	"Adult Education"	Daryl Hall & John Oates
71	"They Don't Know"	Tracey Ullman
72	"An Innocent Man"	Billy Joel
73	"Cruel Summer"	Bananarama
74	"Dance Hall Days"	Wang Chung
75	"Give It Up"	KC and the Sunshine Band
76	"I'm So Excited"	The Pointer Sisters
77	"I Still Can't Get Over Loving You"	Ray Parker Jr.
78	"Thriller"	Michael Jackson
79	"Holiday"	Madonna
80	"Breakin'... There's No Stopping Us"	Ollie & Jerry
81	"Nobody Told Me"	John Lennon
82	"Church of the Poison Mind"	Culture Club
83	"Think of Laura"	Christopher Cross
84	"Time Will Reveal"	DeBarge
85	"Wrapped Around Your Finger"	The Police
86	"Pink Houses"	John Cougar Mellencamp
87	"Round and Round"	Ratt
88	"Head over Heels"	The Go-Go's
89	"The Longest Time"	Billy Joel
90	"Tonight"	Kool & the Gang
91	"Got a Hold on Me"	Christine McVie
92	"Dancing in the Sheets"	Shalamar
93	"Undercover of the Night"	The Rolling Stones
94	"On the Dark Side"	John Cafferty and the Beaver Brown Band
95	"New Moon on Monday"	Duran Duran
96	"Major Tom (Coming Home)"	Peter Schilling
97	"Magic"	The Cars
98	"When You Close Your Eyes"	Night Ranger
99	"Rock Me Tonite"	Billy Squier
100	"Yah Mo B There"	James Ingram and Michael McDonald

== See also ==
- 1984 in music
- Billboard Year-End Hot Black Singles of 1984
- List of Billboard Hot 100 number-one singles of 1984
- List of Billboard Hot 100 top-ten singles in 1984
