= The Best of O'Bryan =

The Best Of O'Bryan

Compilation album by O'Bryan
- Released: 1996
- Recorded: 1982–1986
- Genre: Soul, rhythm and blues
- Length: 62:58
- Label: The Right Stuff
- Producer: O'Bryan, Don Cornelius, Ron Kersey, Melvin Davis, Friendship Producers Company, Jerry Knight & Aaron Zigman

O'Bryan chronology
Surrender (1986)	The Best Of O'Bryan (1996)	F1RST (2007)

The Best of O'Bryan is a compilation of the Capitol Records career of R&B singer O'Bryan.

It was rated 4.5 stars by AllMusic.

== Content ==
Nine previously released tracks were taken as singles from their respective albums -- "The Gigolo," "Still Water (Love)," "You And I," "I'm Freaky," "Lovelite," "Breakin' Together," "Go On And Cry, "Tenderoni" and "Driving Force." Several of the songs were the single mix versions, including O'Bryan's biggest hits "You And I," "I'm Freaky" and "Lovelite."

"Lovelite" topped the Billboard R&B Singles charts in 1984, while "The Gigolo" peaked at No. 5. "I'm Freaky (No. 15)" and O'Bryan's cover of the Stevie Wonder song "You And I (No. 19)" also reached the top 20 of the Billboard R&B Singles charts.

== Track listing ==
No.	Title	Writer(s)	Length
1.	"The Gigolo"	O'Bryan Burnette II, Don Cornelius	4:56
2.	"Still Water (Love)"	Smokey Robinson, Frank Wilson	4:14
3.	"You And I"	Stevie Wonder	3:56
4.	"I'm Freaky"	O'Bryan Burnette II, Don Cornelius	3:56
5.	"Lovelite"	O'Bryan Burnette II, Don Cornelius	3:56
6.	"Breakin' Together"	O'Bryan Burnette II, Don Cornelius	4:03
7.	"Go On And Cry"	O'Bryan Burnette II, Don Cornelius	4:47
8.	"Lady I Love You"	O'Bryan Burnette II, Don Cornelius	5:28
9.	"You're Always On My Mind"	O'Bryan Burnette II, Don Cornelius	5:05
10.	"Be My Lover"	O'Bryan Burnette II, Don Cornelius, Michael Norfleet	5:00
11.	"Tenderoni"	Jerry Knight, Aaron Zigman	3:48
12.	"Driving Force"	O'Bryan Burnette II	3:44
13.	"You Have Got To Come To Me"	Jerry Knight, Aaron Zigman	4:14
14.	"Maria"	O'Bryan Burnette II, Don Cornelius	5:24
