= Surrender (O'Bryan album) =

1986 studio album

Studio album by O'Bryan
- Released: November 1986
- Recorded: 1985–1986 at Larrabee Sound Studios, Los Angeles, California; Avatar; Malibu, California; Conway Recording Studios, Hollywood, California; Cherokee Sound Studios, Los Angeles, California; and Ground Control Studios, Santa Monica, California
- Genres: R&B, Soul
- Length: 41:08
- Label: Capitol
- Producers: O'Bryan; Jerry Knight and Aaron Zigman

O'Bryan chronology
Be My Lover (1984)	Surrender (1986)	The Best Of O'Bryan (1996)

Surrender is the fourth and final Capitol Records studio album by R&B singer O'Bryan. O'Bryan would not record another album until the 2007 release of "F1RST" under his own imprint, Headstorm.

== Reception ==
Professional ratings
Review scores
Source	Rating
Allmusic	2/5 stars

Because of a lengthy negotiation with Capitol, "Surrender" was not released until more than two years after the release of O'Bryan's highest charting album, "Be My Lover." The single choices were the up-tempo "Tenderoni" and "Driving Force," but arguably the strongest cuts on the album were three ballads — "You Have Got To Come To Me," "Maria" and "Is This For Real" — that displayed O’Bryan’s musical and vocal development.

== Track listing ==
No.	Title	Writer(s)	Length
1.	"Tenderoni"	Jerry Knight, Aaron Zigman	3:48
2.	"You Have Got To Come To Me"	Jerry Knight, Aaron Zigman	5:35
3.	"Driving Force"	O'Bryan Burnette II	5:52
4.	"Maria"	O'Bryan Burnette II, Don Cornelius	5:24
5.	"What Goes Around"	Jerry Knight, Aaron Zigman	5:34
6.	"Is This For Real"	O'Bryan Burnette II, Don Cornelius	5:09
7.	"Dreamin' About You"	O'Bryan Burnette II, Don Cornelius	5:31
8.	"Surrender"	Robbie Nevil, Diane Warren	4:17

== Charts ==
Year	Album	Chart positions	
Year	Album	US	US R&B
1986	Surrender	—	66

=== Singles ===
Year	Single	Chart positions		
Year	Single	US	US R&B	US Dance
1986	"Tenderoni"	—	35	—
1987	"Driving Force"	—	60	—

== Personnel ==
- O'Bryan – lead vocals, background vocals, synthesizer bass, drums, keyboards
- Jerry Knight and Aaron Zigman – all instruments on "Tenderoni," "You Have Got To Come To Me" and "What Goes Around"
- Melvin Davis – bass guitar
- Karl Denson – saxophone
- Virgie Hunter – trumpet
- Paul Jackson, Jr. – guitar, acoustic guitar
- Michael Norfleet – synthesizer horns, backgrounds
- Chuck Morris – drums
- Levi Seacer – guitar
- Bruce Sterling – keyboards
- David Vansuch – saxophone
- Alex Brown – background vocals
- Carmen Carter – background vocals
- Lynn Davis – background vocals
- Clayton Dover – background vocals
- Rafael Dover – background vocals
