= Doin' Alright =

Studio album by O'Bryan
- Released: April 30, 1982
- Recorded: 1981–1982 at Larrabee Sound Studios, Los Angeles, California
- Genre: R&B, Soul
- Length: 38:17
- Label: Capitol
- Producer: O'Bryan, Don Cornelius, Melvin Davis, Ron Kersey

O'Bryan chronology
| Doin' Alright (1982) | You And I (1983) |

Doin' Alright is the debut studio album by R&B singer O'Bryan.

== Reception ==
Professional ratings
Review scores
| Source | Rating |
|---|---|
| Allmusic | 3/5 stars |

"Doin' Alright," was released in April 1982 and peaked at No. 10 on the Billboard R&B Albums chart. The lead single, "The Gigolo," was a slice of funk with new wave and rock elements that emphasized O'Bryan's falsetto. Released in January, "The Gigolo" peaked at No. 5 on the Billboard R&B Singles charts.

The follow-up single was an updated cover of The Four Tops' "Still Water (Love)," peaking at No. 23. Among the other standouts on O'Bryan's debut are the mid-tempo title track; the elegant ballad "Love Has Found Its Way;" and the sentimental "Can't Live Without Your Love."

== Track listing ==
| No. | Title | Writer(s) | Length |
|---|---|---|---|
| 1. | "Right From The Start" | O'Bryan Burnette II, Don Cornelius, Melvin Davis | 4:21 |
| 2. | "Love Has Found Its Way" | O'Bryan Burnette II, Don Cornelius, Melvin Davis | 4:26 |
| 3. | "The Gigolo" | O'Bryan Burnette II, Don Cornelius | 4:56 |
| 4. | "It's Over" | Ron Kersey, Stephanie Andrews, Don Cornelius | 5:20 |
| 5. | "Doin' Alright" | O'Bryan Burnette II, Don Cornelius, Melvin Davis | 5:22 |
| 6. | "Can't Live Without Your Love" | O'Bryan Burnette II, Don Cornelius, Melvin Davis | 5:54 |
| 7. | "Mother Nature's Callin'" | O'Bryan Burnette II, Don Cornelius, Melvin Davis | 3:35 |
| 8. | "Still Water (Love)" | Smokey Robinson, Frank Wilson | 4:14 |

== Charts ==
=== Weekly charts ===
| Chart (1982) | Peak position |
|---|---|
| US Billboard 200 | 80 |
| US Top R&B/Hip-Hop Albums (Billboard) | 10 |

=== Year-end charts ===
| Chart (1982) | Position |
|---|---|
| US Top R&B/Hip-Hop Albums (Billboard) | 50 |

=== Singles ===
| Year | Single | Chart positions | | |
| Year | Single | US | US R&B | US Dance |
|---|---|---|---|---|
| 1982 | "The Gigolo" | 57 | 5 | — |
| 1982 | "Still Water (Love)" | — | 23 | — |

== Personnel ==
- O'Bryan – lead vocals, background vocals, clavinet, acoustic piano
- Paulinho da Costa – percussion
- Melvin Davis – bass guitar, electric piano
- Wilton Felder – tenor saxophone
- Gary Grant – lead trumpet
- Bill Green – baritone saxophone
- Larry Hall – trumpet
- Terry Harrington – tenor saxophone
- Ron Kersey – electric piano, synthesizers, background vocals
- Johnny McGhee – guitar
- Bob Payne – trombone
- Jack Perry – synthesizers
- Greg Phillinganes – acoustic piano
- Barry Rudolph – percussion
- David Shields – drums
- Melvin Webb – drums
- Sam Dees – background vocals
- Jeffrey Osborne – background vocals
- The Waters – background vocals
- Bruce Miller – string and horn arrangements
