= List of people who appeared on Soul Train =

This is a list of performers who have appeared on the American musical dance program Soul Train.

== Alphabetized list of celebrity guests ==
=== # ===
- 112
- 2nd Nature
- 3LW
- 3T
- 702
- 7669
- 98 Degrees

=== A ===
- Aaliyah
- A-ha
- Akon
- All-4-One
- Allure
- ATL
- Ashanti
- Ashford & Simpson
- After 7
- Average White Band

=== B ===
- Jon B.
- B2K
- B5
- Baby Bash
- Babyface
- Backstreet Boys
- Erykah Badu
- Baha Men
- Philip Bailey
- Anita Baker
- Tyra Banks
- Rob Base and DJ E-Z Rock
- Beastie Boys
- Bell Biv DeVoe
- Regina Belle
- Eric Benét
- George Benson
- Rhian Benson
- Berlin
- Chuck Berry
- Big Gipp
- Big Daddy Kane
- BlackGirl
- The Black Eyed Peas
- Guerilla Black
- Black Ivory
- Blackstreet
- Bobby Bland
- Blaque
- Blue Magic
- Mary J. Blige
- Kurtis Blow
- Angela Bofill
- Michael Bolton
- Bone Thugs-n-Harmony
- Boney M.
- Bow Wow
- David Bowie
- Tom Bradley
- The Brand New Heavies
- The Brothers Johnson
- Chris Brown
- Bobby Brown
- Foxy Brown
- Brass Construction
- James Brown
- Jim Brown
- Sleepy Brown
- The Boys
- Boyz II Men
- Brandy
- Toni Braxton
- Peabo Bryson
- Joe Budden
- Jerry Butler
- Busta Rhymes

=== C ===
- Cameo
- Tevin Campbell
- Tisha Campbell
- Canela
- Nick Cannon
- Blu Cantrell
- Captain & Tennille
- Irene Cara
- Mariah Carey
- Carl Carlton
- Ralph Carter
- C+C Music Factory
- Cedric the Entertainer
- Chairmen of the Board
- Chamillionaire
- Gene Chandler
- Cheech & Chong
- Cherrelle
- Morris Chestnut
- Chic
- The Chi-Lites
- Chingy
- Chubb Rock
- Ciara
- Corey Clark
- Club Nouveau
- Dennis Coffey
- Keyshia Cole
- Natalie Cole
- Desiree Coleman
- Bootsy Collins
- Color Me Badd
- John Coltrane
- Sean Combs
- Commodores
- Common
- The Controllers
- Con Funk Shun
- Earl Thomas Conley (duet with Anita Pointer)
- Coolio
- The Cover Girls
- Deborah Cox
- Crown Heights Affair
- Culture Club
- Mark Curry

=== D ===
- D4L
- Da Brat
- D'Angelo
- Damian Dame
- Jeffrey Daniel
- Billy Davis Jr.
- Ossie Davis
- Tyrone Davis
- Morris Day
- Dazz Band
- DeBarge
- Bunny DeBarge
- Chico DeBarge
- El DeBarge
- Rick Dees
- De La Soul
- Del tha Funkee Homosapien
- The Dells
- The Delfonics
- Dem Franchize Boyz
- Destiny's Child
- DJ Jazzy Jeff & The Fresh Prince
- Lamont Dozier
- Tom Dreesen
- Jermaine Dupri
- Duran Duran
- Dwele
- Dynasty

=== E ===
- Sheila E.
- Earth, Wind & Fire
- Sheena Easton
- Dennis Edwards
- Missy Elliott
- The Emotions
- En Vogue
- Eric B. & Rakim
- Eric Monterio
- Faith Evans
- Tiffany Evans
- Eve
- Expose
- Elton John
- Earl Thomas Conley

=== F ===
- Fabolous
- Donald Faison
- Lola Falana
- Fantasia
- The Faragher Brothers
- The Fat Boys
- Fat Joe
- Fatty Koo
- José Feliciano
- Kim Fields
- Richard "Dimples" Fields
- The 5th Dimension
- First Choice
- Fishbone
- Five Stairsteps
- Five Star
- Flipsyde
- Floetry
- George Foreman
- For Real
- Four Tops
- Vivica A. Fox
- Jamie Foxx
- Redd Foxx
- Frankie J
- Aretha Franklin
- Kirk Franklin
- Doug E. Fresh
- Friends of Distinction
- Full Force
- Funkadelic

=== G ===
- Rosie Gaines
- Gang Starr
- The Gap Band
- Siedah Garrett
- Marvin Gaye
- Nona Gaye
- Ginuwine
- Gloria Gaynor
- Go West
- Goapele
- The Good Girls
- Graham Central Station
- Larry Graham
- Grandmaster Flash and the Furious Five
- Teresa Graves
- Macy Gray
- Al Green
- Brian Austin Green
- Cee Lo Green
- Vivian Green
- Pam Grier
- Rosey Grier
- Justin Guarini
- Guy
- Jasmine Guy

=== H ===
- Deitrick Haddon
- Arsenio Hall
- Hall & Oates
- Anthony Hamilton
- Herbie Hancock
- Jackée Harry
- Dan Hartman
- Steve Harvey
- Donny Hathaway
- Lalah Hathaway
- Isaac Hayes
- Heather Headley
- Heavy D & the Boyz
- Sherman Hemsley
- Michael Henderson
- Nona Hendryx
- Don Henley
- Marcos Hernandez
- Howard Hewett
- Dru Hill
- Gregory Hines
- Simone Hines
- Jennifer Holliday
- Dave Hollister
- Honey Cone
- Telma Hopkins
- Houston
- Marques Houston
- Thelma Houston
- Whitney Houston
- Miki Howard
- Terrence Howard
- The Hues Corporation
- Van Hunt
- Phyllis Hyman

=== I ===
- Ice Cube
- Ice-T
- Ike & Tina Turner
- Immature (band)
- The Impressions
- India.Arie
- James Ingram
- Luther Ingram
- The Intruders
- The Isley Brothers

=== J ===
- Frankie J
- Jacki-O
- Freddie Jackson
- The Jackson 5
- Janet Jackson
- Jermaine Jackson
- Jesse Jackson
- La Toya Jackson
- Michael Jackson
- Millie Jackson
- Rebbie Jackson
- Jagged Edge
- Etta James
- Leela James
- Rick James
- Al Jarreau
- Ja Rule
- Wyclef Jean
- Lyfe Jennings
- Jeru the Damaja
- The Jets
- Jhene
- Jodeci
- Joe
- Elton John
- Howard Johnson
- JoJo
- Jon B.
- Donell Jones
- Grace Jones
- Howard Jones
- Mike Jones
- Quincy Jones
- Montell Jordan
- Junior Giscombe

=== K ===
- Kashif
- KC and the Sunshine Band
- K-Ci & JoJo
- Kelis
- R. Kelly
- Tara Kemp
- Eddie Kendricks
- Kenny G
- T'Keyah Crystal Keymáh
- Alicia Keys
- Chaka Khan
- Kindred the Family Soul
- B.B. King
- Evelyn King
- George Kirby
- Klique
- Klymaxx
- Gladys Knight & the Pips
- Jean Knight
- Knoc-turn'al
- Solange Knowles
- Kool & the Gang
- Kool Moe Dee
- Apollonia Kotero
- Lenny Kravitz
- Kris Kross
- KRS-One
- Toshinobu Kubota
- Kut Klose

=== L ===
- Labelle
- Patti LaBelle
- Lace
- Lakeside
- Major Lance
- Stacy Lattisaw
- Murphy Lee
- John Legend
- LeToya
- LeVert
- Gerald Levert
- Glenn Lewis
- Ramsey Lewis
- Lil Jon
- Lil' Kim
- Lil' Mo
- Lil' Romeo
- Lina
- Cuban Link
- Lisa Lisa and Cult Jam
- Little Anthony & The Imperials
- Little Milton
- Little Richard
- LL Cool J
- Tone Lōc
- LaToya London
- Loon
- Jennifer Lopez
- The Love Unlimited Orchestra
- L.T.D.
- Carrie Lucas
- Ludacris
- Lumidee
- Cheryl Lynn

=== M ===
- Main Ingredient
- Mandrill
- Teena Marie
- Mario
- Ziggy Marley
- Branford Marsalis
- Tisha Campbell
- Mary Jane Girls
- Mickey Mouse Club
- Mary Mary
- Hugh Masekela
- Master P
- Johnny Mathis
- The Manhattan Transfer
- Martha and the Vandellas
- Maxwell
- Midnight Star
- Curtis Mayfield
- MC Hammer
- Marilyn McCoo
- Mantra
- George McCrae
- Michael McDonald
- Brian McKnight
- MC Lyte
- Harold Melvin & the Blue Notes
- Method Man
- Midnight Star
- Christina Milian
- Milli Vanilli
- Stephanie Mills
- The Miracles
- Monica
- Chanté Moore
- Melba Moore
- Teedra Moses
- J. Moss
- Mr. Cheeks
- Mtume
- Letta Mbulu
- Nicole C. Mullen
- Musiq Soulchild
- Mýa
- Mystikal

=== N ===
- Johnny Nash
- Nate Dogg
- Naughty by Nature
- Meshell Ndegeocello
- Nelly
- Robbie Nevil
- Aaron Neville
- Newcleus
- New Birth
- New Edition
- New Kids on the Block
- Next
- Denise Nicholas
- Anisha Nicole
- Nivea
- Smokie Norful

=== O ===
- O'Bryan
- O'Ryan
- Billy Ocean
- Ohio Players
- The O'Jays
- Omarion
- Shaquille O'Neal
- Jeffrey Osborne
- OutKast
- Oliver Henderson

=== P ===
- Ralfi Pagan
- Paula Jai Parker
- Ray Parker Jr.
- Robert Palmer
- Parliament-Funkadelic
- Karyn Parsons
- Billy Paul
- Sean Paul
- Freda Payne
- Walter Payton
- Peaches & Herb
- Pebbles
- Mario Van Peebles
- Nia Peeples
- Holly Robinson Peete
- Teddy Pendergrass
- CeCe Peniston
- Amanda Perez
- Brock Peters
- Pet Shop Boys
- Jazze Pha
- Wilson Pickett
- P.M. Dawn
- Anita Pointer
- Bonnie Pointer
- June Pointer
- The Pointer Sisters
- Billy Preston
- Pretty Ricky
- Pretty Poison
- Prince (& The Revolution)
- Richard Pryor
- Public Enemy
- Pussycat Dolls

=== Q ===
- Quad City DJ's
- Queen Latifah

=== R ===
- Sheryl Lee Ralph
- Tarralyn Ramsey
- Raven-Symoné
- Lou Rawls
- Raydio
- Ray, Goodman & Brown
- Ray J
- Ready for the World
- Redman
- Alfonso Ribeiro
- Lionel Richie
- Minnie Riperton
- Rockie Robbins
- Smokey Robinson
- Vicki Sue Robinson
- Rockwell
- The Romantics
- The Roots
- Diana Ross
- Kelly Rowland
- Rose Royce
- David Ruffin
- Rufus
- Run-D.M.C.
- Patrice Rushen

=== S ===
- Buffy Sainte-Marie
- Sapelo Mack
- Salt-n-Pepa
- Sammie
- Gloria Scott (singer-songwriter)
- Jill Scott
- Michael Sembello
- Seventh Wonder
- Shaggy
- Shalamar
- Shanice
- Shannon
- Dee Dee Sharp
- Karen Clark Sheard
- Kierra "Kiki" Sheard
- Silkk the Shocker
- Sinbad
- Sisqó
- Sister Sledge
- Nina Sky
- Skyy
- Slim Thug
- Sly and the Family Stone
- Lonnie Liston Smith
- Snap!
- Snoop Dogg
- Trey Songz
- The SOS Band
- Soul II Soul
- Spandau Ballet
- Aries Spears
- Tracie Spencer
- The Spinners
- Stacye & Kimiko
- Mavis Staples
- The Staple Singers
- Starpoint
- Bobby Starr
- Edwin Starr
- Amii Stewart
- Jermaine Stewart
- Sting
- The Stylistics
- The Sugarhill Gang
- Donna Summer
- The Supremes
- Keith Sweat
- SWV
- The Sylvers
- Edmund Sylvers
- Foster Sylvers

=== T ===
- Mr. T
- Tag Team
- Take 6
- The Party
- Tamia
- A Taste of Honey
- Taurus
- Tatyana Ali
- Tavares
- The Temptations
- Tony Terry
- Wallace Terry
- Joe Tex
- Carl Thomas
- Lillo Thomas
- Thompson Twins
- The Three Degrees
- T.I.
- Tichina Arnold
- Tierra
- Justin Timberlake
- The Time
- TLC
- Today
- Tom Tom Club
- Tonéx
- Tony! Toni! Toné!
- Total
- Tower of Power
- Robert Townsend
- The Trammps
- T.Q.
- Ralph Tresvant
- Trillville
- Trin-i-tee 5:7
- Truth Hurts
- Tina Turner
- Tweet
- Cicely Tyson

=== U ===
- Leslie Uggams
- The Undisputed Truth
- Urban Mystic
- Usher

=== V ===
- Frankie Valli
- Luther Vandross
- Vanity
- Vanity 6
- Gino Vannelli
- Melvin Van Peebles
- Countess Vaughn
- Ben Vereen
- Village People
- Tiffany Villarreal
- Lark Voorhies

=== W ===
- Jack Wagner
- Junior Walker
- George Wallace
- War
- Warren G
- Dionne Warwick
- Was (Not Was)
- Jody Watley
- Keenen Ivory Wayans
- Veronica Webb
- Mary Wells
- Kim Weston
- The Whispers
- Barry White
- Whodini
- Wild Cherry
- Wild Orchid
- Deniece Williams
- Michelle Williams
- Roshumba Williams
- Vanessa Williams
- Billy Dee Williams
- Al Wilson
- Charlie Wilson
- Jackie Wilson
- Nancy Wilson
- BeBe Winans
- Angela Winbush
- Bill Withers
- Bobby Womack
- Stevie Wonder
- Wreckx-n-Effect
- Keke Wyatt

=== XYZ ===
- Xscape
- Xzibit
- YahZarah
- Yellow Magic Orchestra
- Ying Yang Twins
- Young Black Teenagers
- YoungBloodZ
- Young Rome
- Zapp
