= Be My Lover =

Be My Lover may refer to:

- "Be My Lover" (La Bouche song)
- "Be My Lover" (Inna song)
- "Be My Lover" (Alice Cooper song)
- Be My Lover (La Toya Jackson album)
- Be My Lover (O'Bryan album)
