= Pat Davis =

American dancer

Patricia Davis
- Born: Fort Worth, Texas
- Other names: "The Butterfly", "Madam Butterfly" and "China Doll"
- Occupation: Soul Train line dancer
- Years active: 1971–1976
- Known for: Dancing and fashion

Pat "Madam Butterfly" Davis (b. c.1956) was an American dancer who performed on the television music show Soul Train during the 1970s.

== Biography ==
Davis was born in Fort Worth, Texas, and was five years old when she moved to Los Angeles, California, where she grew up. She said she loved dancing from when she was a child, and put on multiple performances for money from a young age. She lied about her age to get on Soul Train because she was too young to be allowed to dance on the show.

Davis was one of the original Soul Train dancers, and was considered a fan favorite. She became popular for her unique dancing during a dance segment of the show known as the Soul Train line.

She has been called a "fashion and dance icon." She received a lot of fan mail. She was known for wearing 1940s fashions and always having a flower or butterfly clip in her hair. She said she was inspired to wear 40s fashion from The Pointer Sisters, and to wear flowers and butterflies after seeing Diana Ross wear flowers in her hair when playing Billie Holiday in the movie Lady Sings the Blues.

After the Jackson 5 first appeared on Soul Train, Davis gave lessons on neck twists and locking steps to Michael Jackson at his home to help him improve his Robot.

Davis frequently used props, including once sucking on a baby's bottle during the Soul Train line.

Davis was sometimes known as "The Butterfly", "Madam Butterfly" or "China Doll."

Davis was featured in several issues of Right On! magazine, and had a monthly column in Rock & Soul magazine. She danced on the music performance show American Bandstand and appeared on the television show The Dating Game. At the first Soul Train Gang reunion, Davis was voted “Soul Train's Original All Time Diva”. Davis had a cameo appearance in the 1977 movie Disco 9000 where she did a dance to "Disco Lady" by Johnnie Taylor. She was in several groups including Something Special and the duo Essence.

She moved to Vienna, Austria in the early 80s to start a solo music/dance career, then toured through Europe. She married doctor Karl Bachmayer on June 12, 2007.
