= You and I (O'Bryan album) =

You And I

Studio album by O'Bryan
- Released: March 4, 1983
- Recorded: 1982–1983 at Larrabee Sound Studios, Los Angeles, California
- Genre: R&B, Soul
- Length: 41:05
- Label: Capitol
- Producer: O'Bryan

O'Bryan chronology
| Doin' Alright (1982) | You And I (1983) | Be My Lover (1984) |

You and I is the second studio album by R&B singer O'Bryan.

== Overview ==
The album was named after O'Bryan's cover of the Stevie Wonder ballad. Given a more contemporary twist, the title track was the second single (peaking at No. 19 on the Billboard R&B Singles chart) and since has become one of O'Bryan's signature songs.

The lead single, "I'm Freaky", is an upbeat, synth-funk song that peaked at No. 15 on the Billboard R&B Singles chart. Album tracks also receiving notice and airplay were "Together Always", "Soft Touch", and "Soul Train's A Comin'", which became the theme song for the television dance show Soul Train from 1983 to 1987 (the original mix was only used on Soul Train for a few months before changing to a remixed version). The album peaked at No. 13 on the Billboard R&B Albums chart.

== Track listing ==
| No. | Title | Writer(s) | Length |
|---|---|---|---|
| 1. | "I'm Freaky" | O'Bryan Burnette II, Don Cornelius | 5:17 |
| 2. | "Dazzlin' Lady" | O'Bryan Burnette II | 4:37 |
| 3. | "I'm In Love Again" | O'Bryan Burnette II, Don Cornelius | 4:53 |
| 4. | "Together Always" | O'Bryan Burnette II, Don Cornelius | 5:58 |
| 5. | "You and I" | Stevie Wonder | 5:28 |
| 6. | "Shake" | O'Bryan Burnette II, Don Cornelius | 4:50 |
| 7. | "Soft Touch" | O'Bryan Burnette II | 4:46 |
| 8. | "Soul Train's A' Comin'" | O'Bryan Burnette II, Don Cornelius | 5:51 |

== Charts ==
=== Weekly charts ===
| Chart (1983) | Peak position |
|---|---|
| US Billboard 200 | 87 |
| US Top R&B/Hip-Hop Albums (Billboard) | 13 |

=== Year-end charts ===
| Chart (1983) | Position |
|---|---|
| US Top R&B/Hip-Hop Albums (Billboard) | 23 |

=== Singles ===
| Year | Single | Chart positions |
| Year | Single | US R&B |
|---|---|---|
| 1983 | "I'm Freaky" | 15 |
| 1983 | "You And I" | 19 |

== Personnel ==
- O'Bryan – lead vocals, background vocals, synthesizers, acoustic piano, multiple other instruments on all tracks
- Andy Cleaves – trumpet
- Melvin Davis – bass guitar, piccolo bass, acoustic piano, Fender Rhodes piano
- Karl Denson – alto saxophone
- Darrell Frias – electric guitar, acoustic guitar
- Johnny McGhee – electric guitar, acoustic guitar
- Chuck Morris – drums on "Together Always"
- Raphael Hardison – background vocals
- Marvin James – background vocals
