= In the Heart =

Studio album by Kool & the Gang
- Released: November 21, 1983
- Studios: House of Music (West Orange, New Jersey)
- Genre: Smooth R&B
- Length: 34:55
- Label: De-Lite
- Producers: Jim Bonnefond; Ronald Bell; Kool & the Gang

Kool & the Gang chronology
As One (1982)	In the Heart (1983)	Emergency (1984)

Singles from In the Heart
- 1. "Joanna" Released: December 17, 1983; 2. "Tonight" Released: January 1984

Professional ratings
Review scores
Source	Rating
AllMusic	2/5 stars
Rolling Stone	4/5 stars

In the Heart is the fifteenth studio album by the funk/R&B band Kool & the Gang, released on November 21, 1983. Four singles were released from the album, with two singles becoming major hits on the US Hot 100. The first single, "Straight Ahead", failed to chart on the Hot 100, but the second single, "Joanna", reached number two on the charts in the US and UK, and hit number one on the US R&B chart. The third single, "Tonight", peaked at No. 13 on the US Hot 100. The fourth single "(When You Say You Love Somebody) In the Heart" did not chart on the Hot 100, but became a moderate hit on the UK R&B chart.

== Track listing ==
All tracks are written by Kool & the Gang, with co-writing credits noted below.

Side one
No.	Title	Writer(s)	Length
1.	"In the Heart"	James "J.T." Taylor; Ronald Bell	4:03
2.	"Joanna"	Claydes Smith; Taylor	4:20
3.	"Tonight"	Curtis Williams; Taylor	3:53
4.	"Rollin'"	Taylor; Ronald Bell	3:10
5.	"Place for Us"	Williams; Taylor	3:42

Side two
No.	Title	Writer(s)	Length
6.	"Straight Ahead"	Taylor; Ronald Bell	3:31
7.	"Home Is Where the Heart Is"	Ronald Bell	3:51
8.	"You Can Do It"	Williams; Taylor; Ronald Bell	4:39
9.	"September Love"	George Brown; Taylor	4:39
Total length:			34:55

2016 Deluxe Edition bonus tracks
No.	Title	Writer(s)	Length
10.	"Joanna" (single version)	Smith; Taylor	4:02
11.	"Tonight" (AOR mix)	Williams; Taylor	3:53
12.	"(When You Say You Love Somebody) In the Heart" (single remix)	Taylor; Ronald Bell	3:51
13.	"Straight Ahead" (12" long version)	Taylor; Ronald Bell	4:51
14.	"Ladies' Night" (12" '83 remix)	Ronald Bell	7:05
15.	"Tonight" (12" dance mix)	Williams; Taylor	6:17
Total length:			65:58

== Personnel ==
Kool & the Gang

- James "J.T." Taylor – lead vocals, backing vocals
- Curtis "Fitz" Williams – keyboards, Memorymoog, Minimoog, Oberheim OB-X, alto saxophone, backing vocals
- Ronald "Khalis" Bell – Oberheim OB-X, tenor saxophone, backing vocals
- Claydes Charles Smith – guitars
- Robert "Kool" Bell – bass
- George "Funky" Brown – drums
- Dennis "Dee Tee" Thomas – alto saxophone
- Clifford Adams – trombone, backing vocals
- Robert "Spike" Mickens – trumpet
- Michael Ray – trumpet
- Kool & the Gang – horn arrangements

Additional musicians

- Rick Iantosca – guitars (2, 3, 7)
- Brenden Harkin – guitars (3, 5, 9)
- Leslie Reil – guitars (6)
- Will Lee – bass (1, 6)
- Jeff Davis – trumpet (6)
- Greg Poree – string arrangements
- Joe Malin – string contractor
- Gene Orloff – concertmaster

Production

- Kool & the Gang – producers
- Ronald Bell – producer, mixing
- Jim Bonnefond – producer, chief engineer, mixing
- Nelson Ayres – engineer
- Cliff Hodsdon – engineer
- Gabe Vigorito – mixing
- Jose Rodriguez – mastering at Sterling Sound (New York, NY)
- Joe Gastwirt – CD mastering
- Sydney Collier – cover concept
- Y. Bell – cover concept
- Don Lynn – back cover group photography
- Ron Slenzak – cover photography

== Certifications ==
Region	Certification	Certified units/sales
United Kingdom (BPI)	Silver	60,000^{^}
United States (RIAA)	Gold	500,000^{^}
^{^} Shipments figures based on certification alone.
