= List of Cash Box Top 100 number-one singles of 1984 =

This is a list of singles that reached number one on the Cash Box Top 100 Singles chart in 1984, present in chronological order.

Key
†	Indicates best-performing single of 1984

Issue date	Song	Artist
January 7	"Union of the Snake"	Duran Duran
January 14	"Union of the Snake"	Duran Duran
January 21	"Owner of a Lonely Heart"	Yes
January 28	"Owner of a Lonely Heart"	Yes
February 4	"Karma Chameleon"	Culture Club
February 11	"Karma Chameleon"	Culture Club
February 18	"Karma Chameleon"	Culture Club
February 25	"Jump"	Van Halen
March 3	"Jump"	Van Halen
March 10	"99 Luftballons/99 Red Balloons"	Nena
March 17	"Girls Just Want to Have Fun"	Cyndi Lauper
March 24	"Girls Just Want to Have Fun"	Cyndi Lauper
March 31	"Footloose"	Kenny Loggins
April 7	"Footloose"	Kenny Loggins
April 14	"Footloose"	Kenny Loggins
April 21	"Against All Odds (Take a Look at Me Now)"	Phil Collins
April 28	"Against All Odds (Take a Look at Me Now)"	Phil Collins
May 5	"Against All Odds (Take a Look at Me Now)"	Phil Collins
May 12	"Hello"	Lionel Richie
May 19	"Hello"	Lionel Richie
May 26	"Let's Hear It for the Boy"	Deniece Williams
June 2	"Let's Hear It for the Boy"	Deniece Williams
June 9	"Time After Time"	Cyndi Lauper
June 16	"The Reflex"	Duran Duran
June 23	"The Reflex"	Duran Duran
June 30	"Dancing in the Dark"	Bruce Springsteen
July 7	"Dancing in the Dark"	Bruce Springsteen
July 14	"When Doves Cry" †	Prince
July 21	"When Doves Cry" †	Prince
July 28	"When Doves Cry" †	Prince
August 4	"When Doves Cry" †	Prince
August 11	"Ghostbusters"	Ray Parker Jr.
August 18	"Ghostbusters"	Ray Parker Jr.
August 25	"What's Love Got to Do with It"	Tina Turner
September 1	"What's Love Got to Do with It"	Tina Turner
September 8	"What's Love Got to Do with It"	Tina Turner
September 15	"Missing You"	John Waite
September 22	"Missing You"	John Waite
September 29	"Let's Go Crazy"	Prince and the Revolution
October 6	"Let's Go Crazy"	Prince and the Revolution
October 13	"I Just Called to Say I Love You"	Stevie Wonder
October 20	"I Just Called to Say I Love You"	Stevie Wonder
October 27	"I Just Called to Say I Love You"	Stevie Wonder
November 3	"I Just Called to Say I Love You"	Stevie Wonder
November 10	"Purple Rain"	Prince and the Revolution
November 17	"Purple Rain"	Prince and the Revolution
November 24	"Wake Me Up Before You Go-Go"	Wham!
December 1	"Wake Me Up Before You Go-Go"	Wham!
December 8	"I Feel for You"	Chaka Khan
December 15	"The Wild Boys"	Duran Duran
December 22	"The Wild Boys"	Duran Duran
December 29	"Like a Virgin"	Madonna

== See also ==
- 1984 in music
- List of Hot 100 number-one singles of 1984 (U.S.)
