= Adult Education (song) =

1984 single by Hall & Oates

Single by Daryl Hall & John Oates

from the album Rock 'n Soul Part 1
- B-side: "Maneater" (US); "Say It Isn't So" (UK)
- Released: February 1984
- Recorded: September 1983
- Studio: Electric Lady (New York City)
- Genre: New wave, dance-rock
- Length: 5:23 (album version); 3:59 (single edit)
- Label: RCA Victor
- Songwriters: Daryl Hall; John Oates; Sara Allen
- Producers: Daryl Hall; John Oates; Bob Clearmountain

Daryl Hall & John Oates singles chronology
"Say It Isn't So" (1983)	"Adult Education" (1984)	"Out of Touch" (1984)

Music video
- "Adult Education" on YouTube

"Adult Education" is a song by American duo Daryl Hall & John Oates, released as a single in February 1984. The song was featured on the duo's second compilation album Rock 'n Soul Part 1 (1983) and was one of two new tracks that were recorded specifically for the compilation release. The single hit number eight on the US Billboard Hot 100.

== Lyrics ==
The song centers on the plight of a teenage girl in high school. Her girlfriends only "care about what she wears" and the narrator assures her "there's life after high school." The lyrics suggest she is wiser than her years and, in fact, is receiving an education to the behavior of adults in high school.

== Music video ==
The music video to "Adult Education", directed by Tim Pope, takes place in what appears to be a torchlit stone temple or tomb. As Hall & Oates and their band sing, dance and play with modified instruments and ceremonial objects, a middle-aged man in a baseball cap organizes and wields several idols, while chanting. A teenage boy wearing a loincloth and a teenage girl draped in a white sheet cross a platform illuminated with modern lights and ascend a staircase to meet the man, who appears to bless them with an animal idol. The girl removes the sheet from her head and part of her body and the ritual continues. Eventually, both teenagers are placed on stone slabs; the boy acts terrified and appears to be restrained, while the girl lies motionless, her body draped in the white sheet. The video ends with the boy standing behind the idols' altar and the girl sitting on the stone slab in front of it, as Hall & Oates and their band continue to sing, dance and play instruments in the background. The final shots of the video are of hieroglyphs and ceremonial items scattered around the structure.

Hall later criticized the video in the book I Want My MTV: The Uncensored Story of the Music Video Revolution. "Videos began to attract wannabe Cecil B. DeMilles, directors who had almost unlimited budgets and did whatever they felt like. 'Adult Education' is a perfect example. We brought in a director I didn't know [Pope], who was newly hot. He didn't have a clue what to do with the song. The plot? I couldn't tell you." On VH1's Behind the Music retrospective of Hall & Oates' career, Oates also derided many of their old videos, describing this clip as "Survivor on acid".

== Track listings ==
7": RCA / PB-13714 (US)

1. "Adult Education" – 3:59
2. "Maneater" – 4:34

7": RCA / RCA 396 (UK)

1. "Adult Education" – 3:59
2. "Say It Isn't So" – 4:47

12": RCA / PW-13715 (US)

1. "Adult Education" (Special Club Mix) – 6:04
2. "Adult Education" (Special Rock Mix) – 4:33
3. "Maneater" – 4:34

12": RCA / RCAT 396 (UK)

1. "Adult Education" (Extended Version) – 7:03
2. "Say It Isn't So" (Special Extended Dance Mix) – 6:45
3. "I Can't Go for That (No Can Do)" – 6:01

== Charts ==
=== Weekly charts ===
Chart (1984)	Peak position
Australia (Kent Music Report)	94
Belgium (Ultratop 50 Flanders)	9
Canada Top Singles (RPM)	18
Netherlands (Dutch Top 40)	4
Netherlands (Single Top 100)	7
UK Singles (Official Charts)	63
US Billboard Hot 100	8
US Cash Box Top 100	12
US Dance Club Songs (Billboard)	21
US Hot R&B/Hip-Hop Songs (Billboard)	50
US Mainstream Rock (Billboard)	23

=== Year-end charts ===
Chart (1984)	Position
Netherlands (Dutch Top 40)	40
Netherlands (Single Top 100)	73
US Top Pop Singles (Billboard)	70
