= Night Train (TV series) =

American rhythm and blues television program

- Genre: Rhythm and blues Music
- Presented by: Noble Blackwell
- Country of origin: United States
- Original language: English

Production
- Production location: Nashville, Tennessee
- Running time: 60 minutes

Original release
- Network: WLAC-TV; Seven Arts Television (syndication)
- Release: October 1964 – 1966

Night Train is an American rhythm and blues music television program produced by WLAC-TV in Nashville, Tennessee, and hosted and produced by radio broadcaster Noble Blackwell. Beginning in October 1964, it was the first nationally syndicated R&B television series to feature an all-Black cast. The program preceded the debut of Soul Train by six years.

== History ==
Night Train was created by Noble Blackwell, an executive at Nashville radio station WVOL. Blackwell produced and hosted the program, which was filmed at WLAC-TV in Nashville. It featured Nashville musicians backing local singers and visiting R&B performers.

Performers who appeared on the series included Jimmy Church, Frank Howard, Buddy and Stacey, Hal Hardy and Ironing Board Sam. Surviving footage from the program also includes the earliest known film of Jimi Hendrix, who appeared as a backing guitarist before becoming internationally known.

Jackie Shane appeared on Night Train in 1965 after returning to Nashville from Canada. She performed Rufus Thomas's "Walking the Dog"; the surviving recording of the appearance is the only known video footage of Shane.

== Syndication ==
The program initially aired locally in Nashville. In March 1966, Seven Arts Television announced that it was placing Night Train into syndication as a package of 26 one-hour episodes produced by Music Video Inc. of Nashville. Seven Arts continued to offer the 26-episode, one-hour, black-and-white series for syndication at least as late as 1968.

== Cancellation ==
Night Train ended in 1966. Blackwell's widow Katie Blackwell and performers Jimmy Church and Frank Howard later said that the owners of the Grand Ole Opry pressured WLAC's owners to cancel the program because they regarded it as a threat to Opry ticket sales.

== Legacy ==
Night Train has been recognized as an early example of nationally syndicated Black music television. The Country Music Hall of Fame and Museum has described it as the nation's first syndicated R&B television series with an all-Black cast.

Shane's Night Train appearance was later used in the 2024 documentary Any Other Way: The Jackie Shane Story. Because little moving-image footage of Shane survives, the filmmakers relied heavily on photographs, recordings and animation in addition to the Night Train clip.

In April 2024, the Country Music Hall of Fame and Museum held a panel discussion devoted to Night Train as part of its exhibition Night Train to Nashville: Music City Rhythm & Blues Revisited. Participants included former performers Jimmy Church and Frank Howard, Blackwell's widow Katie Blackwell, and their daughter Tracye Blackwell, and surviving footage from the series was shown.
