= First (O'Bryan album) =

F1RST

Studio album by O'Bryan
- Released: February 14, 2007
- Recorded: 2005–2007 at Headstorm Studios, Durham, North Carolina
- Genre: R&B, neo soul
- Length: 50:23
- Label: Headstorm
- Producer: O'Bryan, Romy Geroso

O'Bryan chronology
The Best Of O'Bryan (1996)	F1RST (2007)

F1RST is the fifth studio album by R&B singer O'Bryan, his first release in more than 20 years. It was released on O'Bryan's independent label, Headstorm, on Valentine's Day 2007.

== Reception ==
The ballad-driven set derived its name from what O’Bryan calls “the first step of a new musical journey," highlighted by the songs "Just Like Doin' It," "Can I Kiss Your Lips," "Man Overboard," "Gotta Let You Go" and "Gratitude." Longtime fans of the singer welcomed his return and responded to "F1RST" with enthusiastic reviews on music buyer-driven sites such as Amazon and iTunes.

== Track listing ==
No.	Title	Writer(s)	Length
1.	"Yearning (Intro)"	O'Bryan Burnette II, Romy Geroso	1:12
2.	"Just Like Doin' It"	O'Bryan Burnette II, Romy Geroso	5:05
3.	"Can I Kiss Your Lips"	O'Bryan Burnette II, Romy Geroso	5:27
4.	"Man Overboard"	O'Bryan Burnette II, Romy Geroso	4:52
5.	"Gotta Let You Go"	O'Bryan Burnette II, Romy Geroso	7:00
6.	"Reflection (Interlude)"	O'Bryan Burnette II, Romy Geroso	1:33
7.	"Caught In The Middle"	O'Bryan Burnette II, Romy Geroso	5:16
8.	"Let Me Be The One"	O'Bryan Burnette II, Romy Geroso	7:02
9.	"Virtual Reality"	O'Bryan Burnette II, Romy Geroso	6:47
10.	"Gratitude"	O'Bryan Burnette II, Romy Geroso	4:56
11.	"Hot Summer Night (Interlude)"	O'Bryan Burnette II, Romy Geroso	1:08

== Personnel ==
- O'Bryan – lead vocals, background vocals, synthesizer bass, drums, keyboards
- Romy Geroso – guitar, keyboards, synth bass, drum programming
