= Say It Isn't So (Hall & Oates song) =

1983 single by Hall & Oates

- US promo

Single by Daryl Hall & John Oates

from the album Rock 'n Soul Part 1
- B-side: "Kiss on My List"
- Released: October 1983
- Recorded: September 1983
- Studio: Electric Lady (New York City)
- Genre: Pop rock; blue-eyed soul; new wave
- Length: 4:17 (album version); 3:56 (7" version); 6:45 (special extended mix); 5:15 (video version)
- Label: RCA Records
- Songwriter: Daryl Hall
- Producers: Daryl Hall; John Oates; Bob Clearmountain

Daryl Hall & John Oates singles chronology
"Jingle Bell Rock" (1983)	"Say It Isn't So" (1983)	"Adult Education" (1984)

Music video
- "Say It Isn't So" on YouTube

"Say It Isn't So" is a song performed by American pop rock duo Daryl Hall & John Oates, and written by Daryl Hall. It was released by RCA Records in October 1983 as the first of two new singles from their compilation album Rock 'n Soul Part 1, released that same year (see 1983 in music). The song was remixed as a "special extended dance mix" by John "Jellybean" Benitez, which topped Billboard magazine's Hot Dance Club Play chart. The song peaked at number two on the Billboard Hot 100 for four weeks, coincidentally behind "Say Say Say" by Paul McCartney and Michael Jackson.

== Composition and recording ==
"Say It Isn't So" was written by Daryl Hall during the duo's supporting tour for H_{2}O. It was the first of two new songs recorded during the sessions for Rock 'n Soul Part 1. The sessions took place in September 1983 at Electric Lady Studio A in New York City. The song was produced by Daryl Hall and John Oates, with recording by Bob Clearmountain, who co-produced the recordings. The backing musicians on the song were bassist Tom "T-Bone" Wolk, saxophonist Charles DeChant, guitarist G. E. Smith, drummer Mickey Curry, and percussionist Jimmy Bralower. The song's arrangement was developed in the studio with backing vocals inspired by the Flamingos' version of "I Only Have Eyes for You" and a problem with a break in the song solved by Jimmy Bralower.

== Reception ==
Cash Box called it "a derivative and decidedly Motown-inflected outing" that is "more vital than nostalgic."

== Music videos ==
There were two versions of the video. The first version was once aired on MTV as part of the duo's special titled The Greatest & The Latest. The second version, which was on heavy rotation during the channel's heyday, was filmed on location in New York City and depicted the band gathering under the Brooklyn Bridge at 3:00 a.m. to play the song.

== Chart performance ==
=== Weekly charts ===
Chart (1983–1984)	Peak position
Australia (Kent Music Report)	24
Canada Top Singles (RPM)	18
New Zealand (Recorded Music NZ)	18
UK Singles (Official Charts)	69
US Billboard Hot 100	2
US Adult Contemporary (Billboard)	8
US Dance Club Songs (Billboard)	1
US Hot R&B/Hip-Hop Songs (Billboard)	45
US Mainstream Rock Airplay (Billboard)	18
US Cash Box Top 100	3
US Radio & Records CHR/Pop Airplay Chart	2

=== Year-end charts ===
Year-end chart (1984)	Rank
US Top Pop Singles (Billboard)	22

== Track listings ==
=== 7" 45 RPM ===
Side A
No.	Title	Writer(s)	Length
1.	"Say It Isn't So"	Daryl Hall	3:56

Side B
No.	Title	Writer(s)	Length
1.	"Kiss on My List"	Hall, Janna Allen	3:48

=== 12" 33⅓ RPM ===
Side A
No.	Title	Writer(s)	Length
1.	"Say It Isn't So" (Special Extended Dance Mix)	Hall	6:45

Side B
No.	Title	Writer(s)	Length
1.	"Say It Isn't So" (Dub version)	Hall	4:47
2.	"Kiss on My List"	Hall, Allen	4:24

== See also ==
- List of number-one dance hits (United States)
