= Be My Lover (O'Bryan album) =

Studio album by O'Bryan
- Released: May 18, 1984
- Recorded: 1983–1984 at Larrabee Sound Studios, Los Angeles, California
- Genre: R&B, Soul
- Length: 41:02
- Label: Capitol
- Producer: O'Bryan, Michael Norfleet, Friendship Producers Company

O'Bryan chronology
You And I (1983)	Be My Lover (1984)	Surrender (1986)

Be My Lover is the third studio album by R&B singer O'Bryan.

== Reception ==
Professional ratings
Review scores
Source	Rating
Allmusic	2.5/5 stars

"Be My Lover" was O'Bryan's highest charting collection on the Billboard R&B Albums charts, peaking at No. 3. The first single — the insistent, chugging "Lovelite" — marched to the top of the Billboard R&B Singles chart. The success of "Lovelite" prompted Capitol to release "Breakin' Together" as the next single.

But it was O'Bryan's penchant for ballads — the quiet storm staple "Lady I Love You;" the lovelorn "You’re Always On My Mind;" and "Go On And Cry," which was the third single — that shone as the album’s highlights. The title track also became known as one of O'Bryan's better uptempo songs.

== Track listing ==
No.	Title	Writer(s)	Length
1.	"Lovelite"	O'Bryan Burnette II, Don Cornelius	6:12
2.	"Be My Lover"	O'Bryan Burnette II, Don Cornelius, Michael Norfleet	5:00
3.	"You Gotta Use It"	Michael Norfleet, Don Cornelius, O'Bryan Burnette II	4:57
4.	"Go On And Cry"	O'Bryan Burnette II, Don Cornelius	4:47
5.	"Breakin' Together"	O'Bryan Burnette II, Don Cornelius	5:49
6.	"You're Always On My Mind"	O'Bryan Burnette II, Don Cornelius	5:05
7.	"Too Hot"	O'Bryan Burnette II	4:30
8.	"Lady I Love You"	O'Bryan Burnette II, Don Cornelius	5:28

== Charts ==
Year	Album	Chart positions	
Year	Album	US	US R&B
1984	Be My Lover	64	3

=== Singles ===
Year	Single	Chart positions		
Year	Single	US	US R&B	US Dance
1984	"Lovelite"	—	1	—
1984	"Breakin' Together"	—	32	—
1984	"Go On And Cry"	—	62	—

== Personnel ==
- O'Bryan – lead vocals, background vocals, synthesizers, electric piano, percussion
- Paulinho da Costa – percussion
- Melvin Davis – bass guitar, acoustic piano, Fender Rhodes piano, background vocals
- Karl Denson – tenor saxophone, alto saxophone, horn arrangement
- Darrell Frias – acoustic guitar, guitar
- James Gadson – drums
- Romy Geroso – guitar
- Michael Norfleet – electric piano, acoustic piano
- Johnny McGhee – acoustic guitar, guitar
- Waters – background vocals
- Bruce Miller – horn and string arrangements
