= O'Bryan =

American singer-songwriter

- Born: O'Bryan Burnette II; December 5, 1961 (age 64)
- Genres: Soul; pop; R&B; funk; jazz
- Occupations: Singer-songwriter, musician, composer, multi-instrumentalist, arranger, producer
- Instruments: Vocals, piano, keyboards, synthesizers, clavinet, drums, percussion, synthesizer bass
- Years active: 1979–1987; 2007–present
- Labels: Capitol Records, A&M Records
- Website: obryanmusicnow.com

O'Bryan McCoy Burnette II, known by his stage name O’Bryan (born December 5, 1961), is an American musician, singer, songwriter, record producer, and multi-instrumentalist.

== Early life ==
O'Bryan McCoy Burnette II began playing the piano at 6 years old and then began singing in the church and at local talent shows. In 1974, he and his family moved to Santa Ana, California. O’Bryan was singing in the Second Baptist Church young adult choir when his friend Melanee Kersey approached him about considering a career in music. Melanee Kersey introduced the young singer to her husband, producer Ron Kersey.

A former keyboardist for the Trammps and a veteran of the ’70s Philadelphia music scene, Kersey invited O’Bryan to join a group he was putting together. That group quickly folded, so Kersey later introduced O’Bryan to "Soul Train" television show creator and host Don Cornelius, with whom Kersey formed Friendship Producers Company. Cornelius took the young artist to Capitol Records, where O’Bryan released four albums that charted on the Billboard R&B charts.

== Career ==
=== 1982–86 ===
The first album, Doin' Alright was released in April 1982 and peaked at No. 10 on the Billboard R&B Albums chart. The lead single, “The Gigolo,” was a slice of funk with new wave and rock elements that emphasized O’Bryan's falsetto. Released in January, “The Gigolo” peaked at No. 5 on the Billboard R&B Singles charts.

The follow-up single was an updated cover of the Four Tops’ “Still Water (Love),” peaking at No. 23. Among the other standouts on O’Bryan's debut include the mid-tempo title track; the elegant ballad “Love Has Found Its Way;” and the sentimental “Can’t Live Without Your Love.”

O’Bryan released his sophomore effort You and I in March 1983. The album was named after his cover of the Stevie Wonder ballad. Given a more contemporary twist, the title track was the second single (peaking at No. 19) and since has become one of O’Bryan's signature songs.

The lead single, "I’m Freaky," was an upbeat, synth-funk song that peaked at No. 15. Album tracks also receiving notice and airplay were the romantic “Together Always”; the fluid instrumental “Soft Touch”; and the energetic “Soul Train’s A Comin’”, which became the theme song for Cornelius’ show from 1983 to 1987. The album peaked at No. 13.

In May 1984, O’Bryan released Be My Lover which became his highest charting collection of songs (peaking at No. 3). The first single — the insistent, chugging “Lovelite” — marched to the top of the Billboard R&B Singles chart. The success of “Lovelite” prompted Capitol to release “Breakin’ Together” as the next single. But it was O’Bryan's penchant for ballads — the quiet storm staple “Lady I Love You;” the lovelorn “You’re Always on My Mind;” and “Go on and Cry,” which was the third single — that shone as the album's highlights. The title track also became known as one of O'Bryan's better uptempo songs.

In 1986, O’Bryan released his fourth studio album, Surrender. O’Bryan collaborated with writers Jerry Knight and Aaron Zigman to create the synth drenched “Tenderoni” and “Driving Force.” But arguably the strongest cuts on the album were three ballads — “You Have Got to Come to Me”, “Maria” and “Is This for Real” — that displayed O’Bryan's musical genius. Surrender would be O'Bryan's final album with Capitol Records.

After his exit from Capitol Records, O’Bryan signed to A&M Records. Unfortunately, due to a change in management and creative philosophy, O’Bryan requested a release from A&M. He then signed with Atlantic Records distributed label Third Stone Records which was founded by actor Michael Douglas and record producer Richard Rudolph. Prior to the release of O’Bryan's first release with Third Stone Records, Atlantic Records folded the label. Thus, at the height of his recording career, O’Bryan quietly exited the recording industry.

=== 2007–present ===
In 2007, O’Bryan made his triumphant return releasing his first album in two decades ironically entitled “F1RST”. The set derived its name from what O’Bryan called at the time “the first step of a new musical journey.” “F1RST” included the ballads highlighted by the songs “Just Like Doin’ It,” “Can I Kiss Your Lips”, “Man Overboard”, “Gotta Let You Go” and “Gratitude."

== Discography ==
=== Studio albums ===
Year	Title	Peak chart positions		Record label
Year	Title	US	US R&B	Record label
1982	Doin' Alright	80	10	Capitol
1983	You and I	87	13	Capitol
1984	Be My Lover	64	3	Capitol
1986	Surrender	—	66	Capitol
2007	F1rst	—	—	Headstorm
2017	For the Love of You	—	—	Headstorm
"—" denotes releases that did not chart.

=== Compilation albums ===
- The Best of O'Bryan (1996, The Right Stuff)

=== Singles ===
Year	Title	Peak chart positions		
Year	Title	US	US R&B	US Dan
1982	"The Gigolo"	57	5	62
1982	"Still Water (Love)"	—	23	—
1983	"I'm Freaky"	—	15	—
1983	"You and I"	—	19	—
1983	"Soul Train's a 'Comin' (Party Down)"	—	—	—
1984	"Lovelite"	101	1	37
1984	"Breakin' Together"	—	32	—
1984	"Go on and Cry"	—	62	—
1986	"Tenderoni"	—	35	—
1986	"Dreamin' About You"	—	—	—
1987	"Driving Force"	—	69	—
1987	"You Have Got to Come to Me"	—	—	—
"—" denotes releases that did not chart.
