= Lovelite =

Single by O'Bryan

from the album Be My Lover
- Released: February 1984
- Genre: Soul
- Length: 6:47 (Vocal, 12"); 3:59 (single edit)
- Label: Capitol Records (US V-8583)
- Songwriters: Don Cornelius, O'Bryan McCoy Burnette Jr.
- Producers: Friendship Producers Company, O'Bryan

O'Bryan singles chronology
"Soul Train's a 'Comin' (Party Down)" (1983)	"Lovelite" (1984)	"Breakin' Together" (1984)

"Lovelite" is a 1984 single by the artist O'Bryan. The single was his fifth entry on the R&B chart and his only number-one hit, where it placed at the top spot for one week. "Lovelite" did not chart on the Hot 100. "Lovelite" was produced by O'Bryan and was written by O'Bryan along with Don Cornelius.

The song's original music video became one of the first R&B videos to be banned from MTV, due to extensive nudity.

== Track listing ==
- 12" single

Side one
No.	Title	Length
1.	"Lovelite"	6:47

Side two
No.	Title	Length
1.	"Lovelite" (Instrumental)	6:47

== Chart positions ==
Chart (1984)	Peak position
U.S. Billboard (Bubbling Under) Hot 100	#101
U.S. Billboard Black Singles	#1
U.S. Billboard Hot Dance Club Play	#37
