= Hello (Lionel Richie song) =

1984 song by Lionel Richie

Single by Lionel Richie

from the album Can't Slow Down
- B-side: "You Mean More to Me"
- Released: February 13, 1984
- Recorded: 1983
- Genre: Pop; quiet storm; soft rock
- Length: 4:08
- Label: Motown
- Songwriter: Lionel Richie
- Producers: Lionel Richie; James Anthony Carmichael

Lionel Richie singles chronology
"Running with the Night" (1983)	"Hello" (1984)	"Stuck on You" (1984)

Music video
- "Lionel Richie - Hello (Official Music Video)" on YouTube

"Hello" is a song by American singer and songwriter Lionel Richie. Taken as the third single from his second solo album, Can't Slow Down (1983), the song was released in 1984 and reached number one on three Billboard music charts: the pop chart (for two weeks), the R&B chart (for three weeks), and the Adult Contemporary chart (for six weeks). The song also went to number one on the UK Singles Chart for six weeks.

The song was subject to a lawsuit by songwriter Marjorie Hoffman White, who accused Richie of plagiarizing her 1978 composition "I'm Not Ready to Go".

== Reception ==
Cashbox said that the song "is as melodic and heartwrenching as anything [Richie] has done previously and that’s saying something."

== Composition ==
The song is written in the key of A minor. The verses follow the chord progression of Am_{9}—Cmaj_{7}/G—Fmaj_{7}—C_{6}/G—Fmaj_{7}. The chorus features a Neapolitan chord (Bb).

The composition began with the line, "Hello, is it me you're looking for?". After producer James Anthony Carmichael arrived at Richie's house for a songwriting session, Richie jokingly greeted him with the line, to which Carmichael replied, "Finish that song." Richie initially felt the idea was "corny", but ultimately, "by the time I finished the verse, I fell in love with the song again."

== Music video ==
The music video for "Hello", directed by Bob Giraldi, features the story of Richie as a theater and acting teacher having a seemingly unrequited love for a blind student (Laura Carrington). He discovers the feeling is mutual after he finds that she is sculpting a likeness of his head in clay.

Several publications have likened the song's theme and video to British singer Adele's later song "Hello".

== Notable cover versions ==
A UK garage cover by Jhay Palmer featuring MC Image reached No. 69 on the UK Singles Chart and No. 11 on the UK Dance Singles Chart in 2002.

In September 2015, Richie and Jimmy Fallon covered the song in a humorous duet on The Tonight Show. Within days, the clip had gone viral, garnering over one million views on YouTube.

American singer Demi Lovato sang a rendition of the song as part of a tribute to Richie at the 58th Annual Grammy Awards on February 15, 2016. Her cover version eventually peaked at No. 15 on the Billboard Twitter Top Tracks chart.

Lea Michele and Jonathan Groff covered the song in Glee’s episode "Hell-O” in Glee season 1

== Personnel ==
- Lionel Richie – vocals, acoustic piano, rhythm and vocal arrangements
- Reginald "Sonny" Burke – Fender Rhodes
- Michael Boddicker – synthesizers
- Darrell Jones – electric guitar
- Tim May – acoustic guitar
- Louis Shelton – guitars
- Joe Chemay – bass guitar
- Paul Leim – drums
- James Anthony Carmichael – rhythm and string arrangements
- Harry Bluestone – string concertmaster
- Peter Banks – guitar

== Charts ==
=== Weekly charts ===
Weekly chart performance for "Hello"
Chart (1984)	Peak position
Argentina (CAPIF)	9
Australia (Kent Music Report)	1
Austria (Ö3 Austria Top 40)	3
Belgium (Ultratop 50 Flanders)	1
Brazil (ABPD)	3
Canada Top Singles (RPM)	1
Canada Adult Contemporary (RPM)	1
Chile (UPI)	1
Europe (European Top 100 Singles)	2
Finland (Suomen virallinen lista)	6
France (SNEP)	25
Greece (IFPI)	2
Ireland (IRMA)	1
Mexico (AMPROFON)	10
Netherlands (Dutch Top 40)	1
Netherlands (Single Top 100)	1
New Zealand (Recorded Music NZ)	1
Norway (VG-lista)	5
Paraguay (UPI)	1
Peru (UPI)	1
Portugal (AFP)	2
South Africa (Springbok Radio)	5
Sweden (Sverigetopplistan)	6
Switzerland (Schweizer Hitparade)	1
UK Singles (Official Charts)	1
US Billboard Hot 100	1
US Adult Contemporary (Billboard)	1
US Hot R&B/Hip-Hop Songs (Billboard)	1
US Cash Box Top 100	1
US Black Singles (Cash Box)	1
West Germany (GfK)	2

=== Year-end charts ===
Year-end chart performance for "Hello"
Chart (1984)	Position
Australia (Kent Music Report)	8
Austria (Ö3 Austria Top 40)	16
Belgium (Ultratop 50 Flanders)	9
Canada Top Singles (RPM)	11
Chile (UPI)	2
Netherlands (Dutch Top 40)	12
Netherlands (Single Top 100)	5
Switzerland (Schweizer Hitparade)	5
UK Singles (Gallup)	7
US Billboard Hot 100	7
US Adult Contemporary (Billboard)	2
US Hot R&B/Hip-Hop Songs (Billboard)	7
US Cash Box Top 100	12
US Top 100 Black Contemporary Singles (Cash Box)	10
West Germany (Official German Charts)	27

=== All-time charts ===
All-time chart performance for "Hello"
Chart (1958–2018)	Position
US Billboard Hot 100	389

== Certifications ==
Certifications and sales for "Hello"
Region	Certification	Certified units/sales
Belgium (BRMA)	Platinum	50,000^{*}
Netherlands (NVPI)	Platinum	100,000^{^}
New Zealand (RMNZ)	Gold	15,000^{‡}
United Kingdom (BPI)	Platinum	964,623
United States (RIAA)	Gold	1,000,000^{^}
^{*} Sales figures based on certification alone.^{^} Shipments figures based on certification alone.^{‡} Sales+streaming figures based on certification alone.

== See also ==
- List of number-one singles of 1984 (Australia)
- List of Belgian number-one singles of 1984 (Flanders))
- List of number-one singles of 1984 (Canada)
- List of number-one singles of 1984 (Ireland)
- List of Dutch Top 40 number-one singles of 1984
- List of number-one singles in 1984 (New Zealand)
- List of number-one singles of 1984 (Switzerland)
- List of UK Singles Chart number ones of 1984
- List of Billboard Hot 100 number-one singles of 1984
- List of number-one adult contemporary singles of 1984 (U.S.)
- List of number-one R&B singles of 1984 (U.S.)
- List of Cash Box Top 100 number-one singles of 1984
