= Joanna (Kool & the Gang song) =

- French 7" single

Single by Kool & the Gang

from the album In the Heart
- B-side: "Place for Us"
- Released: 1983
- Genre: R&B, pop
- Length: 4:20 (Album); 4:02 (Single)
- Label: De-Lite/Polygram
- Songwriters: Robert Earl Bell, Ronald Nathan Bell, James Bonnefond, George Melvin Brown, James "J.T." Taylor, Claydes Charles Smith, Clifford Adams and Curtis "Fitz" Williams

Kool & the Gang singles chronology
"Straight Ahead" (1983)	"Joanna" (1983)	"Tonight" (1984)

Alternative release(s)
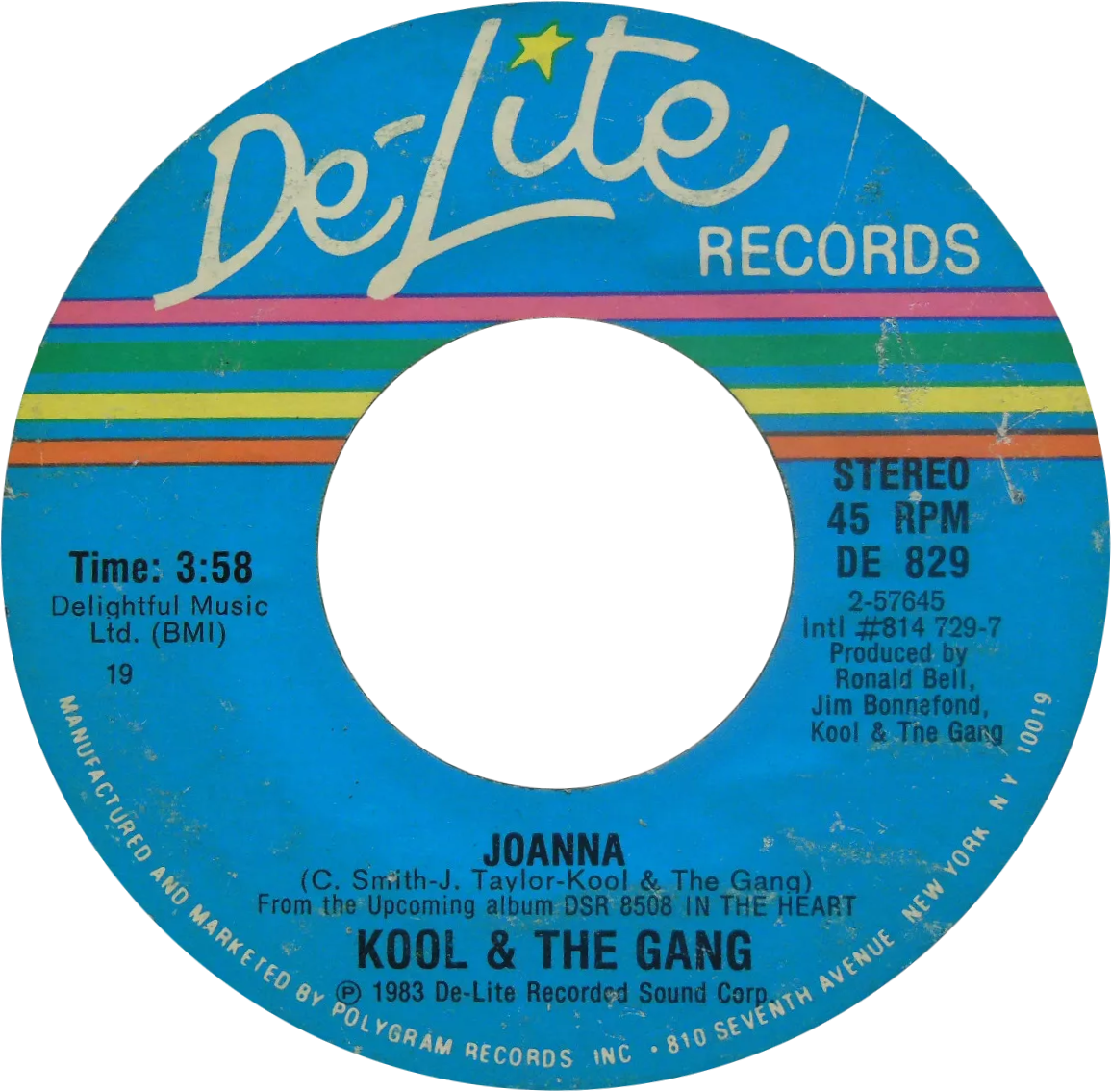
- One of side-A labels of the US single

Music video
- "Joanna" on YouTube

"Joanna" is a song by Kool & the Gang from their 1983 album In the Heart. It was released as a single in November 1983.

== Background ==
A romantic ballad similar to many of Kool & The Gang's later releases, the song features as its main subject the eponymous lady named Joanna. In the group's music video, Joanna is portrayed as the current owner of a small, roadside café named Joanna's Diner. The video was filmed at the Colonial Diner in Lyndhurst, New Jersey, and the Colonial sign can be seen briefly outside in the opening seconds of the video. Throughout the video, she serves the band members as both cook and waitress as they serenade her, and the video occasionally flashes to her younger days as a dancer at the Cotton Club in Harlem who is in love with the character portrayed by James "J.T." Taylor, the group's lead singer.

== Chart performance ==
The song was an immediate hit, peaking at #2 on the Billboard Hot 100 for one week, behind Culture Club's "Karma Chameleon". Additionally, the track reached No. 2 in the UK as well as No. 1 on the U.S. R&B chart.

=== Weekly charts ===
Chart (1983–1984)	Peak position
Australia	45
Canada (RPM Top Singles)	15
Canada (RPM Adult Contemporary)	1
Ireland (IRMA)	4
New Zealand (RMNZ)	7
South Africa (Springbok)	21
UK Singles Chart	2
Uruguay (UPI)	4
US Billboard Hot 100	2
US Billboard Adult Contemporary	2
US Billboard Hot Black Singles	1
US Cash Box Top 100	3
Venezuela (UPI)	2

=== Year-end charts ===
Chart (1984)	Rank
UK Singles	23
US Billboard Hot 100	24
US Cash Box Top 100	36

== Certifications ==
Region	Certification	Certified units/sales
United Kingdom (BPI)	Silver	250,000^{^}
United States (RIAA)	Gold	500,000^{^}
^{^} Shipments figures based on certification alone.

== Cover versions ==
- In 1989, Japanese singing duo Wink covered the song in the Japanese language with custom lyrics focusing on friendship.

== See also ==
- List of Hot Black Singles number ones of 1984
