= List of Billboard Hot 100 number ones of 1984 =

These are the Billboard Hot 100 number-one hits of 1984.

Overall, Prince spent the most weeks at number one in 1984, reigning for seven weeks at the top with "When Doves Cry" and "Let's Go Crazy" (with the Revolution). However, "Like a Virgin" by Madonna had the longest run at number one of any song which rose into the top position during 1984. Though it spent only two weeks at number one at the end of the year, it went on to spend an additional four weeks at the top to begin 1985, for a total of six weeks.

That year, 15 acts achieved their first number one song, such as Yes, Culture Club, Van Halen, Kenny Loggins, Phil Collins, Cyndi Lauper, Duran Duran, Prince, Ray Parker Jr., Tina Turner, John Waite, The Revolution, Billy Ocean, Wham!, and Madonna. Prince was the only act to hit number one more than once that year, with two.

== Chart history ==
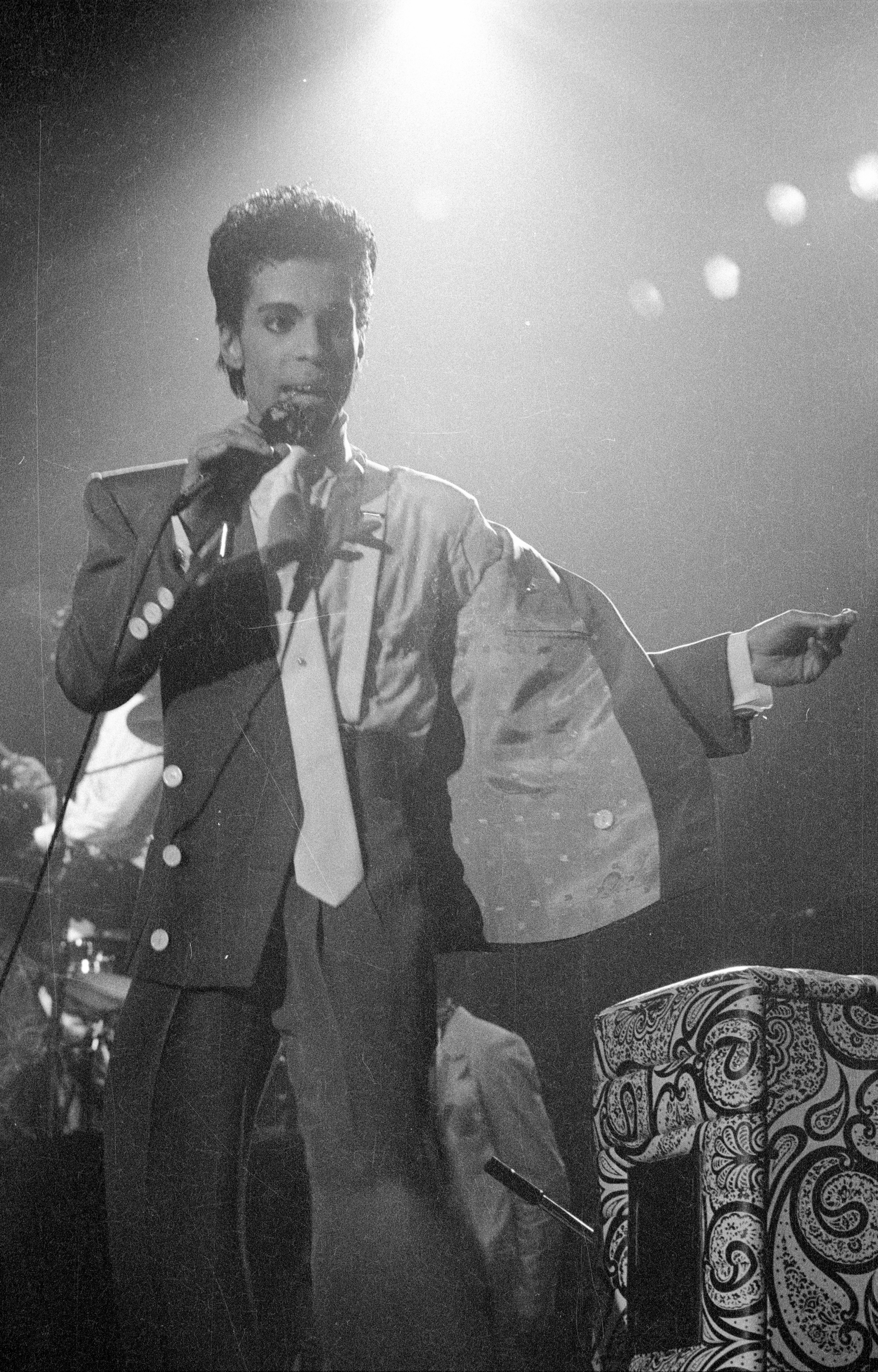
Prince scored two number one singles and spent seven weeks atop the chart.

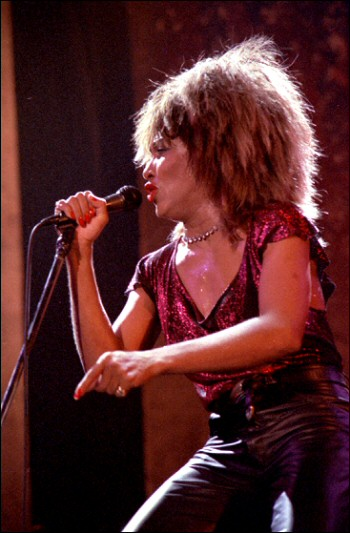
Tina Turner gained her first and only U.S. number-one single with "What's Love Got to Do with It".

| No. | Issue date | Song | Artist(s) | Ref. |
|---|---|---|---|---|
| 542 | January 7 | "Say Say Say" | Paul McCartney and Michael Jackson | |
| 542 | January 14 | "Say Say Say" | Paul McCartney and Michael Jackson | |
| 543 | January 21 | "Owner of a Lonely Heart" | Yes | |
| 543 | January 28 | "Owner of a Lonely Heart" | Yes | |
| 544 | February 4 | "Karma Chameleon" | Culture Club | |
| 544 | February 11 | "Karma Chameleon" | Culture Club | |
| 544 | February 18 | "Karma Chameleon" | Culture Club | |
| 545 | February 25 | "Jump" | Van Halen | |
| 545 | March 3 | "Jump" | Van Halen | |
| 545 | March 10 | "Jump" | Van Halen | |
| 545 | March 17 | "Jump" | Van Halen | |
| 545 | March 24 | "Jump" | Van Halen | |
| 546 | March 31 | "Footloose" | Kenny Loggins | |
| 546 | April 7 | "Footloose" | Kenny Loggins | |
| 546 | April 14 | "Footloose" | Kenny Loggins | |
| 547 | April 21 | "Against All Odds (Take a Look at Me Now)" | Phil Collins | |
| 547 | April 28 | "Against All Odds (Take a Look at Me Now)" | Phil Collins | |
| 547 | May 5 | "Against All Odds (Take a Look at Me Now)" | Phil Collins | |
| 548 | May 12 | "Hello" | Lionel Richie | |
| 548 | May 19 | "Hello" | Lionel Richie | |
| 549 | May 26 | "Let's Hear It for the Boy" | Deniece Williams | |
| 549 | June 2 | "Let's Hear It for the Boy" | Deniece Williams | |
| 550 | June 9 | "Time After Time" | Cyndi Lauper | |
| 550 | June 16 | "Time After Time" | Cyndi Lauper | |
| 551 | June 23 | "The Reflex" | Duran Duran | |
| 551 | June 30 | "The Reflex" | Duran Duran | |
| 552 | July 7 | "When Doves Cry" | Prince | |
| 552 | July 14 | "When Doves Cry" | Prince | |
| 552 | July 21 | "When Doves Cry" | Prince | |
| 552 | July 28 | "When Doves Cry" | Prince | |
| 552 | August 4 | "When Doves Cry" | Prince | |
| 553 | August 11 | "Ghostbusters" | Ray Parker Jr. | |
| 553 | August 18 | "Ghostbusters" | Ray Parker Jr. | |
| 553 | August 25 | "Ghostbusters" | Ray Parker Jr. | |
| 554 | September 1 | "What's Love Got to Do with It" | Tina Turner | |
| 554 | September 8 | "What's Love Got to Do with It" | Tina Turner | |
| 554 | September 15 | "What's Love Got to Do with It" | Tina Turner | |
| 555 | September 22 | "Missing You" | John Waite | |
| 556 | September 29 | "Let's Go Crazy" | Prince and the Revolution | |
| 556 | October 6 | "Let's Go Crazy" | Prince and the Revolution | |
| 557 | October 13 | "I Just Called to Say I Love You" | Stevie Wonder | |
| 557 | October 20 | "I Just Called to Say I Love You" | Stevie Wonder | |
| 557 | October 27 | "I Just Called to Say I Love You" | Stevie Wonder | |
| 558 | November 3 | "Caribbean Queen (No More Love on the Run)" | Billy Ocean | |
| 558 | November 10 | "Caribbean Queen (No More Love on the Run)" | Billy Ocean | |
| 559 | November 17 | "Wake Me Up Before You Go-Go" | Wham! | |
| 559 | November 24 | "Wake Me Up Before You Go-Go" | Wham! | |
| 559 | December 1 | "Wake Me Up Before You Go-Go" | Wham! | |
| 560 | December 8 | "Out of Touch" | Daryl Hall and John Oates | |
| 560 | December 15 | "Out of Touch" | Daryl Hall and John Oates | |
| 561 | December 22 | "Like a Virgin" | Madonna | |
| 561 | December 29 (Note: This was an unpublished week, due to a special double issue that Billboard published in print the previous week, for the year-end charts, and covered two weeks; all Billboard weekly charts were "frozen" during the break.) | "Like a Virgin" | Madonna | |

== Number-one artists ==
List of number-one artists by total weeks at number one
| Position | Artist | Weeks at No. 1 |
|---|---|---|
| 1 | Prince | 7 |
| 2 | Van Halen | 5 |
| 3 | Culture Club | 3 |
| 3 | Kenny Loggins | 3 |
| 3 | Phil Collins | 3 |
| 3 | Ray Parker Jr. | 3 |
| 3 | Tina Turner | 3 |
| 3 | Stevie Wonder | 3 |
| 3 | Wham! | 3 |
| 10 | Paul McCartney | 2 |
| 10 | Michael Jackson | 2 |
| 10 | Yes | 2 |
| 10 | Lionel Richie | 2 |
| 10 | Deniece Williams | 2 |
| 10 | Cyndi Lauper | 2 |
| 10 | Duran Duran | 2 |
| 10 | Billy Ocean | 2 |
| 10 | Daryl Hall and John Oates | 2 |
| 10 | Madonna | 2 |
| 20 | John Waite | 1 |

== See also ==
- 1984 in music
- List of Cash Box Top 100 number-one singles of 1984
- List of Billboard Hot 100 number-one singles of the 1980s
