= Don Cornelius =

American TV host and producer (1936–2012)

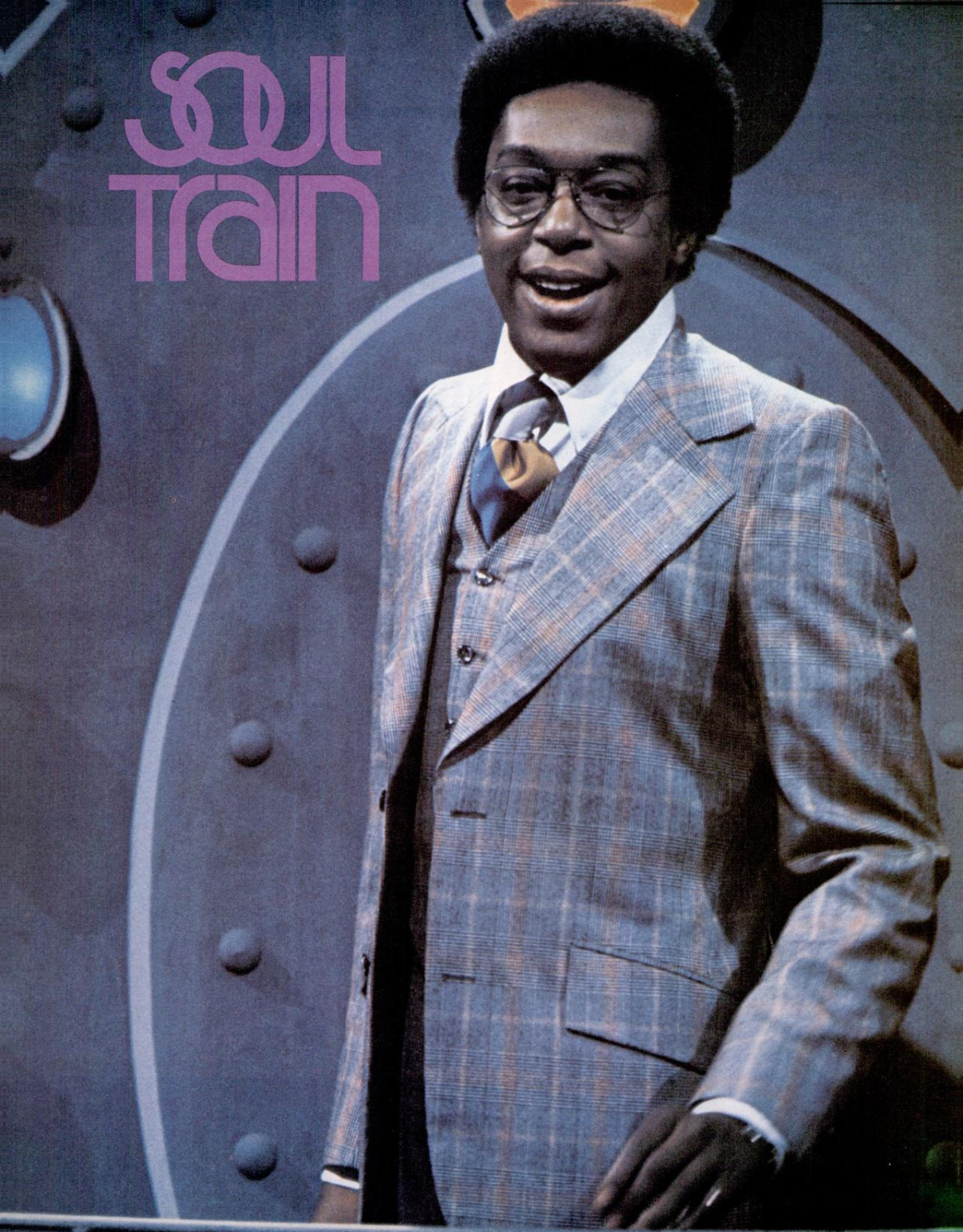
- Cornelius in 1974
- Born: Donald Cortez Cornelius; September 27, 1936; Chicago, Illinois, U.S.
- Died: February 1, 2012 (aged 75); Los Angeles, California, U.S.
- Occupations: Television host, producer
- Years active: 1966–2012
- Television: Soul Train
- Spouses: Delores Harrison (m. 1956; div. 1976) Viktoria Chapman (m. 2001; div. 2009)
- Children: 2

Donald Cortez Cornelius (September 27, 1936 – February 1, 2012) was an American television show host and producer widely known as the creator of the nationally syndicated dance and music show Soul Train, which he hosted from 1970 until 1993. Cornelius sold the show to MadVision Entertainment in 2008. On November 3, 2023, he was posthumously inducted into the Rock and Roll Hall of Fame with the Ahmet Ertegun Award.

== Early life and career ==
Cornelius was born on Chicago's South Side on September 27, 1936, and raised in the Bronzeville neighborhood. After graduating from DuSable High School in 1954, he joined the United States Marine Corps and served for 18 months in Korea. He worked at various jobs following his stint in the military, including selling tires, automobiles, and insurance, and as an officer with the Chicago Police Department. He quit his day job to take a three-month broadcasting course in 1966, despite being married with two sons and having only $400 in his bank account. In 1966, he landed a job as an announcer, news reporter and disc jockey on Chicago radio station WVON.

Cornelius joined Chicago television station WCIU-TV in 1967 and hosted a news program called A Black's View of the News. In 1970, he launched Soul Train on WCIU-TV as a daily local show. The program entered national syndication and moved to Los Angeles the following year. Eddie Kendricks, Gladys Knight & the Pips, Bobby Hutton and Honey Cone were featured on the national debut episode.

Originally a journalist and inspired by the civil rights movement, Cornelius recognized that in the late 1960s there were very few television venues in the United States for soul music (at the time, only one series, the public television show Soul!, was focused on the genre, an earlier show, Night Train, had ended production in 1966). He introduced many African-American musicians to a larger audience as a result of their appearances on Soul Train, a program that was both influential among African-Americans and popular with a wider audience.

As writer, producer, and host of Soul Train, Cornelius was instrumental in offering wider exposure to black musicians such as James Brown, Aretha Franklin, Marvin Gaye, and Michael Jackson, as well as creating opportunities for talented dancers, setting a precedent for popular television dance programs. Cornelius said, "We had a show that kids gravitated to," and Spike Lee described the program as an "urban music time capsule".

With the creation of Soul Train, Cornelius was at the helm of a program that showed African Americans in a new light, creating a Black is Beautiful campaign. Prior to Soul Train, African Americans were only occasionally performing on TV, mostly as guests on white-centered programs. Soul Train showcased African American culture, and brought African American musicians and dancers to television. The show's appeal to white audiences steadily grew and eventually earned a huge following.

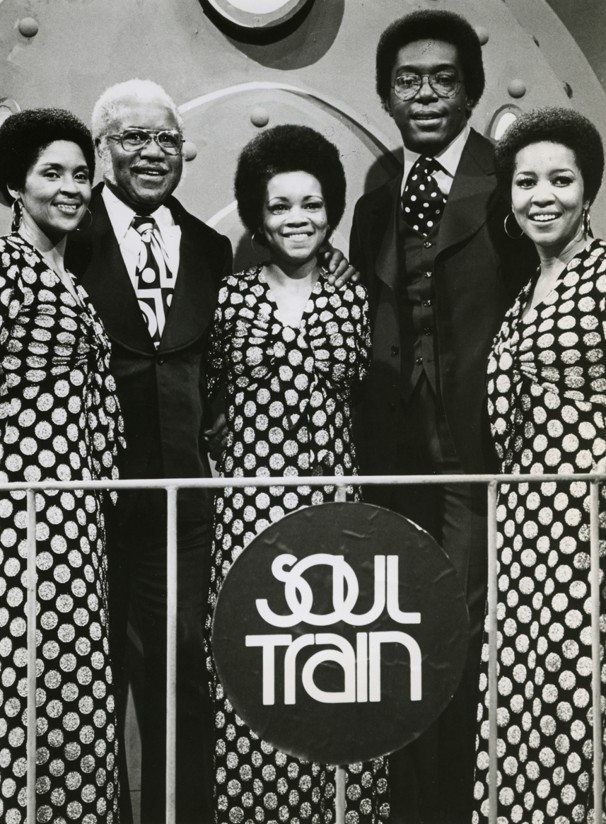
Cornelius (second from right) with The Staple Singers during production of a 1974 episode of Soul Train.

Besides his smooth and deep voice and his afro, which slowly shrank over the years as hairstyle tastes changed, Cornelius was best known for the catchphrase that he used to close the show: "and you can bet your last money, it's all gonna be a stone gas, honey! I'm Don Cornelius, and as always in parting, we wish you love, peace and soul!" After Cornelius's departure, it was shortened to "and as always, we wish you love, peace and soul!" and it was used through the most recent new episodes in 2006. Another introductory phrase which he often used was: "We got another sound comin' out of Philly that's a sure 'nough dilly".

He had a small number of film roles, such as record producer Moe Fuzz in 1988's Tapeheads and a fictional version of himself in 1987's The Return of Bruno, a mockumentary about fictional singer Bruno Radolini, portrayed by Bruce Willis. In this doc Cornelius appears as the host of the local Detroit funk-gospel based show Bless My Soul, that presents Radolini's return to the stage with a duet together with the Temptations.

Cornelius last appeared on the episode of the TV series Unsung featuring Full Force, which was aired two days before his death.

== Controversy ==
=== Arrest ===
In October 2008, Cornelius was arrested at his Los Angeles home on Mulholland Drive on a felony domestic violence charge. He was released on bail. Cornelius appeared in court in November 2008, and was charged with spousal abuse and dissuading a witness from filing a police report. Cornelius appeared in court again in December 2008, and pleaded not guilty to spousal abuse.

He was banned from going near his estranged wife, Russian model Victoria Avila-Cornelius (Viktoria Chapman), who had obtained two restraining orders against him. In March 2009, he changed his plea to no contest and was placed on 36 months of probation.

=== Sexual assault allegation ===
In the 2022 A&E documentary miniseries Secrets of Playboy, Cornelius was accused of sexually assaulting two Playboy bunnies in the 1970s. The women were alleged to have been brought to Cornelius's house for a three-day period where they were locked in separate rooms, bound, drugged and sexually assaulted. Cornelius's son, Tony, released a statement calling the allegation an "unbelievable story without real proof".

== Death ==
At around 4 a.m. PST on February 1, 2012, police were called to Cornelius's home in Los Angeles after reports of a shooting. He was found with a self-inflicted gunshot wound to the head and was taken to Cedars-Sinai Medical Center, where he was pronounced dead at the age of 75.

An autopsy found that Cornelius had been suffering from seizures during the last 15 years of his life, a complication of a 21-hour brain operation he underwent in 1982 to correct a congenital deformity in his cerebral arteries. He admitted that he was never quite the same after that surgery, and it was a factor in his decision to retire from hosting Soul Train in 1993. Cornelius's health took a further, sharp decline in the last six months of his life. Former Soul Train host Shemar Moore suggested that he may have also been in the early stages of dementia or Alzheimer's disease by this point. On the night of his suicide, Cornelius told his son in a phone call, "I don't know how much longer I can take this".
