= Culture Club discography =

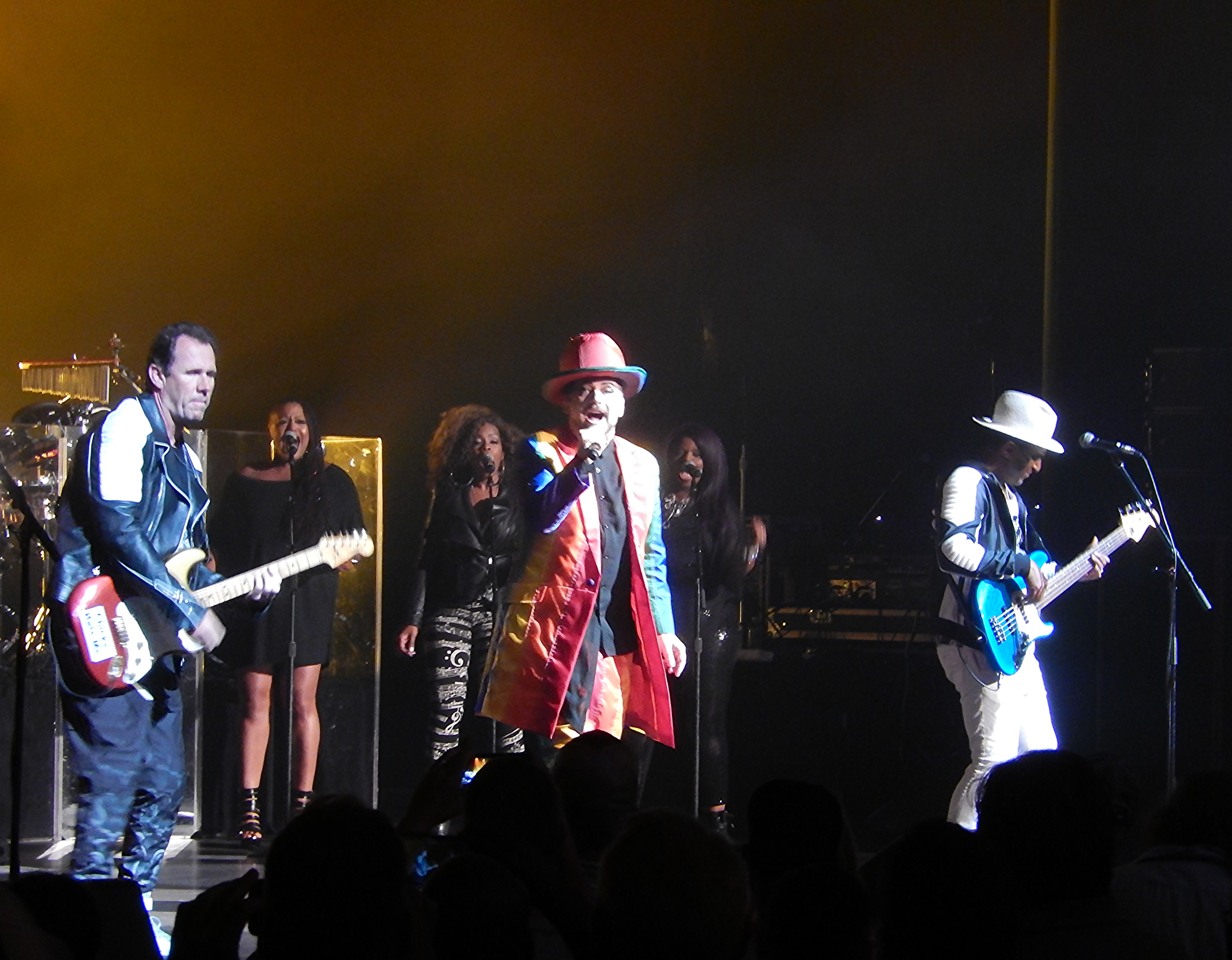
- Culture Club at Marcus Centre for the Performing Arts; Milwaukee, Wisconsin; 23 July 2016
- Studio albums: 6
- Extended plays: 3
- Live albums: 4
- Compilation albums: 14
- Singles: 29
- Video albums: 6
- Music videos: 22
- Box sets: 4

Culture Club's discography consists of 6 studio albums, 9 compilation albums, 3 box sets, 3 extended plays, 24 regular commercial singles, and 5 promotional singles, largely released during the 1980s and 1990s. Culture Club has sold more than 50 million records worldwide, including 7 million records in the United States. For the comprehensive Boy George solo discography, see Boy George discography.

== Albums ==
=== Studio albums ===
Title	Album details	Peak chart positions										Certifications (sales thresholds)
Title	Album details	UK	AUS	CAN	GER	IT	NL	NZ	NOR	SWI	US	Certifications (sales thresholds)
Kissing to Be Clever	Released: 8 October 1982; Label: Virgin, Epic; Formats: LP, MC, 8-track	5	12	2	8	22	10	2	3	9	14	BPI: Platinum; MC: 3× Platinum; RIAA: Platinum; RMNZ: Gold
Colour by Numbers	Released: 10 October 1983; Label: Virgin, Epic; Formats: CD, LP, MC, 8-track	1	1	1	6	9	3	1	2	4	2	BPI: 3× Platinum; MC: Diamond; NVPI: Platinum; RIAA: 4× Platinum; RMNZ: Platinum
Waking Up with the House on Fire	Released: 22 October 1984; Label: Virgin, Epic; Formats: CD, LP, MC, 8-track	2	2	6	22	7	7	15	9	21	26	BPI: Platinum; MC: 2× Platinum; RIAA: Platinum; RMNZ: Platinum
From Luxury to Heartache	Released: 1 April 1986; Label: Virgin, Epic; Formats: CD, LP, MC	10	25	34	45	14	28	44	18	24	32	BPI: Silver
Don't Mind If I Do	Released: 22 November 1999; Label: Virgin; Formats: CD, MC	64	—	—	—	—	—	—	—	—	—	
Life (featuring Boy George)	Released: 26 October 2018; Label: BMG; Formats: CD, LP, MC, digital download	12	— (Note: Life did not enter the ARIA Albums Chart, but peaked at number 25 on the ARIA Digital Albums Chart.)	—	58	66	—	—	—	89	—	
"—" denotes releases that did not chart or were not released in that territory.

=== Live albums ===
Title	Album details
The River Sessions	Released: May 2005; Label: River; Formats: CD
Live at the Royal Albert Hall – 20th Anniversary Concert	Released: 8 July 2013; Label: Angel Air; Formats: CD+DVD, digital download
Live at Wembley World Tour 2016	Released: 8 December 2017; Label: Cleopatra; Formats: CD+DVD, CD+DVD+Blu-ray, 2xLP, digital download
Live 1983 – Lido Beach	Released: 25 March 2022; Label: Laser Media; Formats: CD

=== Compilation albums ===
Title	Album details	Peak chart positions									Certifications (sales thresholds)
Title	Album details	UK	AUS	AUT	IT	JPN	NL	NZ	NOR	US	Certifications (sales thresholds)
This Time – The First Four Years	Released: 6 April 1987; Label: Virgin; Formats: CD, LP, MC	8	62	—	10	30	44	25	—	—	BPI: Gold
The Best of Culture Club	Released: September 1989; Label: Virgin; Formats: CD, LP, MC	—	—	—	—	—	—	—	—	—	BPI: Gold
Collect – 12" Mixes Plus	Released: 7 January 1991; Label: Virgin; Formats: CD, MC	—	—	—	—	—	—	—	—	—	
Spin Dazzle – The Best of Boy George and Culture Club	Released: 29 June 1992; Label: Virgin; Formats: CD, LP, MC	—	—	36	—	—	—	—	—	—	
At Worst... The Best of Boy George and Culture Club (featuring Boy George)	Released: 20 September 1993; Label: Virgin; Formats: CD, MC	24	—	—	—	—	—	—	—	169	BPI: Silver
Greatest Moments	Released: 9 November 1998; Label: Virgin; Formats: 2xCD, MC	15	—	—	—	94	—	—	23	148	BPI: Platinum
Greatest Hits	Released: 21 June 2005; Label: Virgin; Formats: CD	—	—	—	—	—	—	—	—	—	
Culture Club 2005 – Singles and Remixes	Released: July 2005; Label: Virgin; Formats: CD	—	—	—	—	—	—	—	—	—	
Platinum	Released: 24 June 2008; Label: EMI; Formats: CD	—	—	—	—	—	—	—	—	—	
Miss Me Blind – Greatest Hits Live!	Released: 9 August 2011; Label: Fuel 2000; Formats: CD	—	—	—	—	—	—	—	—	—	
The Hits Collection	Released: 13 February 2012; Label: Music Club Deluxe; Formats: 2xCD	—	—	—	—	—	—	—	—	—	
10 Great Songs	Released: 3 April 2012; Label: Virgin; Formats: CD	—	—	—	—	—	—	—	—	—	
Sight & Sound – Greatest Hits on CD & DVD	Released: 6 August 2012; Label: EMI; Formats: CD+DVD	—	—	—	—	—	—	—	—	—	
Icon (Note: Icon was originally released by Virgin in the US and Canada in May 2013. An expanded release with a different cover was released in the UK and Europe by Universal in November 2013.)	Released: 14 May 2013; Label: Virgin; Formats: CD	—	—	—	—	—	—	—	—	—	
Japanese Singles Collection-Greatest Hits	Released: 21 December 2022; Label: Universal Music Japan; Formats: CD+DVD	—	—	—	—	—	—	—	—	—	
"—" denotes releases that did not chart or were not released in that territory.

=== Box sets ===
Title	Album details
Waking Up with the House on Fire / Colour by Numbers	Released: 1997; Label: EMI/Virgin; Formats: 2xCD; Australia-only release
Culture Club	Released: 2 December 2002; Label: Virgin; Formats: 4xCD
The Best of Culture Club / Collect – 12inch Mixes Plus	Released: September 2003; Label: Virgin; Formats: 2xCD
Kissing to Be Clever / Colour by Numbers	Released: 3 May 2011; Label: Virgin; Formats: 2xCD

== EPs ==
Title	EP details	Peak chart positions
Title	EP details	JPN
Time	Released: 21 May 1983; Label: Virgin; Formats: 12"; Japan-only release	8
Love Is Love	Released: 20 April 1985; Label: Virgin; Formats: 12"; Japan-only release	9
Culture Club	Released: 1985; Label: Amiga; Formats: 7"; East Germany-only release	—
"—" denotes releases that did not chart or were not released in that territory.

== Singles ==
Title	Year	Peak chart positions										Certifications (sales thresholds)	Album
Title	Year	UK	AUS	BEL	CAN	GER	IRE	IT	NL	NZ	US	Certifications (sales thresholds)	Album
"White Boy"	1982	— (Note: This single did not enter the UK Singles Chart, but did reach number 94 on the Record Business Top 100 Singles chart.)	—	—	—	—	—	—	—	—	—		Kissing to Be Clever
"I'm Afraid of Me"	1982	— (Note: This single did not enter the UK Singles Chart, but did reach number 82 on the Record Business Top 100 Singles chart.)	—	—	—	—	—	—	—	—	—		Kissing to Be Clever
"Mystery Boy" (Note: "Mystery Boy" was only released as a single in Japan. It was only included on the Japanese release of Kissing to Be Clever.)	1982	—	—	—	—	—	—	—	—	—	—		Kissing to Be Clever
"Do You Really Want to Hurt Me"	1982	1	1	1	1	1	1	1	2	2	2	BPI: Gold; BVMI: Gold; MC: Platinum; NVPI: Gold	Kissing to Be Clever
"Time (Clock of the Heart)"	1982	3	12	13	4	16	4	—	10	4	2	BPI: Gold; MC: Gold	Kissing to Be Clever
"Church of the Poison Mind"	1983	2	4	9	5	23	2	15	11	9	10	BPI: Gold; MC: Gold	Colour by Numbers
"I'll Tumble 4 Ya" (Note: "I'll Tumble 4 Ya" was only released as a single in North America.)	1983	—	—	—	5	—	—	—	—	—	9	MC: Gold	Kissing to Be Clever
"Karma Chameleon"	1983	1	1	1	1	2	1	3	1	1	1	BPI: 2× Platinum; BVMI: Gold; MC: 2× Platinum; RIAA: Gold; RMNZ: Gold	Colour by Numbers
"Victims"	1983	3	4	11	—	39	2	2	17	7	—	BPI: Gold	Colour by Numbers
"Miss Me Blind" (Note: "Miss Me Blind" was only released as a single in North America, continental Europe, Australia, Japan, and several other territories.)	1984	—	26	—	6	—	—	21	—	—	5	MC: Gold	Colour by Numbers
"It's a Miracle"	1984	4	14	15	16	41	2	—	15	5	13		Colour by Numbers
"Mister Man" (Note: "Mister Man" was only released as a single in South Africa.)	1984	—	—	—	—	—	—	—	—	—	—		Colour by Numbers
"The War Song"	1984	2	2	4	3	12	1	4	7	5	17	BPI: Silver; MC: Gold	Waking Up with the House on Fire
"The Medal Song"	1984	32	—	—	—	—	14	—	—	50	—		Waking Up with the House on Fire
"Mistake No. 3" (Note: "Mistake No. 3" was only released as a single in North America, Australia, and several other territories.)	1984	—	61	—	24	—	—	—	—	—	33		Waking Up with the House on Fire
"Love Is Love" (Note: "Love Is Love" was only released as a single in continental South America, Japan, and several other territories.)	1985	—	—	—	—	—	—	23	—	—	—		Electric Dreams (soundtrack)
"Don't Go Down That Street" (Note: "Don't Go Down That Street" was only released as a single in Japan.)	1985	—	—	—	—	—	—	—	—	—	—		Non-album single
"Move Away"	1986	7	10	8	15	21	6	11	16	16	12		From Luxury to Heartache
"God Thank You Woman"	1986	31	48	31	—	—	22	—	—	—	—		From Luxury to Heartache
"Gusto Blusto" (Note: "Gusto Blusto" was only released as a single in North America.)	1986	—	—	—	88	—	—	—	—	—	—		From Luxury to Heartache
"I Just Wanna Be Loved"	1998	4	84	—	—	80	35	—	—	—	—	BPI: Silver	Greatest Moments
"Your Kisses Are Charity"	1999	25	—	—	—	88	—	—	—	—	—		Don't Mind If I Do
"Cold Shoulder"/"Starman"	1999	43	—	—	—	—	—	—	—	—	—		Don't Mind If I Do
"Do You Really Want to Hurt Me" (DJ LBR remix) (Note: This remix of "Do You Really Want to Hurt Me" was only released as a single in France.)	2005	—	—	—	—	—	—	—	—	—	—		Culture Club 2005 – Singles and Remixes
"More Than Silence"	2014	—	—	—	—	—	—	—	—	—	—		Life
"Let Somebody Love You" (featuring Boy George)	2018	—	—	—	—	—	—	—	—	—	—		Life
"Life"	2018	—	—	—	—	—	—	—	—	—	—		Life
"God & Love"	2018	—	—	—	—	—	—	—	—	—	—		Life
"Runaway Train" (featuring Boy George & Gladys Knight)	2019	—	—	—	—	—	—	—	—	—	—		Life
"Letting It Go/The Next Thing Will Be Amazing"	2026	—	—	—	—	—	—	—	—	—	—		
"—" denotes releases that did not chart or were not released in that territory.

=== Promotional and other singles ===
- 1984–89: 19 flexi discs titled "Boy Talk" were issued by Culture Club's official Multicultural Fan Club between March 1984 and December 1989
- 1985: "Don't Talk About It" (Mexico-only promo release)
- 1986: "Heaven's Children"/"Come Clean" (cancelled release)
- 1992: "Culture Club Megamix" (Sweden-only promo release)
- 1999: "Sign Language" (promo release)
- 2000: "See Thru" (promo release as the moniker CD:UK)
- 2003: "If I Were You" (promo release)
- 2022: "Time 2022" (digital release)

== Videos ==
=== Video albums ===
Title	Album details
A Kiss Across the Ocean	Released: 18 April 1984; Label: Virgin Video, CBS Fox Video; Formats: VHS, Beta, LD
This Time – The First Four Years	Released: 6 April 1987; Label: Virgin Video; Formats: VHS, Beta, LD
Don't Mind If I Do... Video 3-Pack	Released: 30 September 2000; Label: Virgin/Zebra Marketing; Formats: VHS; Limited release
Live at the Royal Albert Hall – 20th Anniversary Concert	Released: 10 March 2003; Label: Angel Air, Hot JWP Music; Formats: DVD
Greatest Hits	Released: 25 October 2004; Label: Virgin; Formats: DVD
Live in Sydney	Released: 16 May 2006; Label: EV Classics; Formats: DVD

=== Music videos ===
Title	Year	Director
"Do You Really Want to Hurt Me"	1982	Julien Temple
"Time (Clock of the Heart)"	1982	Chris Gabrin
"Church of the Poison Mind"	1983	Chris Gabrin
"I'll Tumble 4 Ya"	1983	Zelda Barron
"Karma Chameleon"	1983	Peter Sinclair
"Victims"	1983	Godley & Creme
"Black Money"	1983	Keith McMillan
"Miss Me Blind"	1984	Zelda Barron
"It's a Miracle"	1984	Zelda Barron
"The War Song"	1984	Russell Mulcahy
"The Medal Song"	1984	Zelda Barron
"Mistake No. 3"	1984	David Mallet
"Love Is Love"	1985	Steve Barron
"The Dream"	1985	Steve Barron
"Move Away"	1986	Willy Smax
"God Thank You Woman"	1986	Steve Barron
"Gusto Blusto"	1986	Various
"I Just Wanna Be Loved"	1998	Ben Unwin
"Your Kisses Are Charity"	1998	Ben Unwin
"Cold Shoulder"	1998	Ben Unwin
"Let Somebody Love You"	2018	Howard Greenhalgh
"Life"	2018	Mark Whelan
