= Greatest Hits (Culture Club album) =

Greatest hits album by Culture Club
- Released: 21 June 2005
- Recorded: 1982–1999
- Genre: New wave
- Length: 69:49
- Label: Virgin
- Producer: Steve Levine, John Themis, Arif Mardin, Lew Hahn

Culture Club chronology
Culture Club Box Set (2002)	Greatest Hits (2005)	Life (2018)

Greatest Hits is a greatest hits compilation by British band Culture Club with androgynous frontman Boy George. It was released in the US and Canada on 21 June 2005.

The album includes their best known hits, starting with their debut album Kissing to Be Clever, and finishing with their most recent album Don't Mind If I Do. Because their final album was not released in America, this compilation was the only US release which featured the UK singles "Your Kisses Are Charity" and "Cold Shoulder". Only one American Culture Club single was omitted from the compilation, the non-charting "Gusto Blusto" from 1986's From Luxury to Heartache. By 2006, US sales for the album were reported at 40,164 although it failed to make Billboard's album chart.

This compilation was reissued for the European market in August 2010. It was released as a DVD and CD combo, the DVD including 17 music videos and a 13-song live show from December 1983, recorded at the Hammersmith Odeon and titled A Kiss Across the Ocean, which was previously released on VHS in 1984. This CD is reflection of the DVD, including the 17 audio tracks of those videos, with some different mixes and edits.

AllMusic rated it four and a half stars, noting "That said, those who do want a good 17-song cross-section of the band's entire career will be very happy with this, since it has all the singles in good sound."

== Track listing ==
US edition

1. "Do You Really Want to Hurt Me" from Kissing to Be Clever
2. "Time (Clock of the Heart)" from Kissing to Be Clever
3. "I'll Tumble 4 Ya" from Kissing to Be Clever
4. "White Boy" (Dance Mix) from Kissing to Be Clever
5. "Church of the Poison Mind" from Colour by Numbers
6. "Karma Chameleon" from Colour by Numbers
7. "Miss Me Blind" from Colour by Numbers
8. "It's a Miracle" from Colour by Numbers
9. "Victims" from Colour by Numbers
10. "Black Money" from Colour by Numbers
11. "The War Song" from Waking Up with the House on Fire
12. "Mistake No. 3" from Waking Up with the House on Fire
13. "Love is Love" from Electric Dreams movie soundtrack
14. "Move Away" from From Luxury to Heartache
15. "I Just Wanna Be Loved" from Don't Mind If I Do
16. "Cold Shoulder" from Don't Mind If I Do
17. "Your Kisses Are Charity" from Don't Mind If I Do

UK edition

1. "Do You Really Want to Hurt Me?" from Kissing to Be Clever
2. "Time (Clock of the Heart)" from Kissing to Be Clever
3. "I'll Tumble 4 Ya" from Kissing to Be Clever
4. "Church of the Poison Mind" from Colour by Numbers
5. "Karma Chameleon" from Colour by Numbers
6. "Victims" from Colour by Numbers
7. "It's a Miracle" from Colour by Numbers
8. "Miss Me Blind" from Colour by Numbers
9. "The War Song" from Waking Up with the House on Fire
10. "The Medal Song" from Waking Up with the House on Fire
11. "Mistake No. 3" from Waking Up with the House on Fire
12. "Love is Love" from Electric Dreams movie soundtrack
13. "Move Away" from From Luxury to Heartache
14. "God Thank You Woman" from From Luxury to Heartache
15. "I Just Wanna Be Loved" from Don't Mind If I Do
16. "Cold Shoulder" from Don't Mind If I Do
17. "Your Kisses Are Charity" from Don't Mind If I Do
