= Greatest Moments – VH1 Storytellers Live =

Greatest hits album by Culture Club
- Released: 9 November 1998
- Recorded: 1982–1998
- Genre: Pop; rock
- Length: 59:58
- Label: Virgin

Culture Club chronology
At Worst... The Best of Boy George and Culture Club (1993)	Greatest Moments – VH1 Storytellers Live (1998)	Don't Mind If I Do (1999)

Greatest Moments is a greatest hits compilation by British band Culture Club. It was released in the UK on 9 November 1998, where it reached No. 15 in the UK Albums Chart and was certified platinum.

== Content ==
The album includes songs released by the band, spanning from their debut album (1982's Kissing to Be Clever), to their most recent single "I Just Wanna Be Loved", which reached No. 4 in the UK Singles Chart in 1998. It also features three solo Boy George tracks.

A limited edition bonus disc titled VH1 Storytellers Live, featured Culture Club performing selected songs live in front of a small audience on 2 May 1998 at Sony Studios in New York City, for the VH1 network's Storytellers television music series. It features the first release of the song "Strange Voodoo" (released in a studio version on their 1999 album Don't Mind If I Do) and the only release of the reggae track "What Do You Want".

== Track listing ==
All tracks are written by Culture Club, except as noted

Disc one
No.	Title	Writer(s)	Length
1.	"Do You Really Want to Hurt Me"		4:29
2.	"Time (Clock of the Heart)"		3:44
3.	"Church of the Poison Mind"		3:31
4.	"Karma Chameleon"	George O'Dowd, Jon Moss, Michael Craig, Roy Hay & Phil Pickett	4:01
5.	"Victims"		4:55
6.	"I'll Tumble 4 Ya"		2:35
7.	"It's a Miracle"	O'Dowd/Moss/Craig/Hay/Pickett	3:24
8.	"Miss Me Blind"		4:30
9.	"Move Away"	O'Dowd/Moss/Craig/Hay/Pickett	4:09
10.	"Love is Love" (from Electric Dreams)		3:51
11.	"Everything I Own" (Boy George solo track)	David Gates	3:56
12.	"The Crying Game" (Boy George solo track)	Geoff Stephens	3:22
13.	"I Just Wanna Be Loved"		4:37
14.	"Generations of Love (The Timewriter Bootleg Mix)" (performed by Jesus Loves You) (UK edition only)	Angela Dust, Caron Geary & Simon Rogers	8:48
Total length:			59:58

Disc two, VH1 Storytellers Live
No.	Title	Length
1.	"Church Of The Poison Mind"	4:26
2.	"Miss Me Blind"	5:38
3.	"Move Away"	4:09
4.	"I'll Tumble 4 Ya"	2:51
5.	"It's A Miracle"	4:08
6.	"That's The Way (I'm Only Trying To Help You)"	4:07
7.	"Strange Voodoo"	5:36
8.	"I Just Wanna Be Loved"	4:32
9.	"What Do You Want"	5:27
10.	"The Crying Game"	3:50
11.	"Victims"	5:37
12.	"Do You Really Want To Hurt Me"	5:32
13.	"Time (Clock Of The Heart)"	5:15
14.	"Karma Chameleon"	4:57
Total length:		73:05

== Charts ==
Chart (1998)	Peak position
UK Albums Chart	15
US Albums Chart	148
Japanese Albums Chart	94

== Certifications ==
Region	Certification	Certified units/sales
United Kingdom (BPI)	Platinum	300,000^{^}
^{^} Shipments figures based on certification alone.
