= Don't Go Down That Street =

Single by Culture Club
- A-side: "The Medal Song"
- Released: 1985, in Japan only
- Recorded: 1984
- Genre: New wave
- Length: 6:35
- Label: Virgin Records
- Songwriter(s): Culture Club
- Producer(s): Steve Levine

Culture Club singles chronology
"Mistake No.3" (1984)	"Don't Go Down That Street" (1985)	"Love Is Love (in Canada, Europe and Brazil)" (1985)

"Don't Go Down That Street" is a song by 1980s new wave band Culture Club. It was released as the B-side to their 1984 single "The Medal Song" (a song about the 1930s American actress Frances Farmer, who was featured on the sleeve of the single). It later appeared as a bonus track on the 2003 CD reissue of the album Waking Up with the House on Fire.

In the tradition of earlier Culture Club songs, "Don't Go Down That Street" includes chatting, but instead of Jamaican patois, it features Japanese chatting by Miko, Boy George's friend at the time. That song was recorded especially to be a B-Side, after the other songs were made for the Waking Up album. There are two versions of the track: one short for the single in Japan, and another, around six minutes long, which can be found as the B-Side of various singles.

Even though the song was available as a B-side in most countries (it was also the B-side of "Mistake No. 3" in Canada and the U.S.), it still received a separate release in Japan as a single in 1985 for the Japan-only "Love Is Love EP", where it peaked at number 69.
