= From Luxury to Heartache =

Studio album by Culture Club
- Released: 1 April 1986
- Recorded: 1985–1986
- Studio: Mountain (Montreux, Switzerland); Atlantic (New York City)
- Genre: Pop; reggae
- Length: 44:04
- Label: Virgin (UK); Epic (US)
- Producer: Arif Mardin; Lew Hahn

Culture Club chronology
Waking Up with the House on Fire (1984)	From Luxury to Heartache (1986)	This Time – The First Four Years (1987)

Singles from From Luxury to Heartache
- 1. "Move Away" Released: 3 March 1986; 2. "God Thank You Woman" Released: 19 May 1986; 3. "Gusto Blusto" Released: 23 June 1986 (US)

Professional ratings
Review scores
Source	Rating
AllMusic	link
Robert Christgau	(C) link
Smash Hits	4/10 stars
Sounds	2.5/5 stars

From Luxury to Heartache is the fourth album by the British pop band Culture Club, released in April 1986. It was the last studio album released by Culture Club until 1999's Don't Mind If I Do.

== Background ==
From Luxury to Heartache was produced by veteran pop and R&B producer Arif Mardin, who replaced Steve Levine, the producer of Culture Club's previous three albums, in a bid to revitalise the band's sound. Due to lead singer Boy George's growing addiction to drugs, recordings dragged on for so long that Mardin had to disband the sessions and leave it up to engineer Lew Hahn to record the final vocals. The final credit on the album gave production credit to both Mardin and Hahn on all tracks. Songs like "Gusto Blusto" and "Reasons" took days for the addicted singer to finish.

Following the release of the album, rumours of George's heroin addiction began to circulate in the press and in British and US tabloids, and by the summer of 1986, he announced that he was indeed addicted to drugs. In July, he was arrested for possession of cannabis. Several days later, keyboardist Michael Rudetsky, who played on the album and had co-written "Sexuality" with George, was found dead from a heroin overdose in George's home.

== Commercial performance and single releases ==
Lead single "Move Away" became a hit in several countries around the world. However, also around this time, media reports of lead singer Boy George's drug abuse were starting to surface. "God Thank You Woman" was the second single released from the album in Europe and Asia, it peaked at number 31 on the UK Singles Chart, while in North and South America "Gusto Blusto" was chosen as a single, but it failed to chart on the US Hot 100.

Another single, "Heaven's Children", was scheduled for release in the UK, but was cancelled. Within a year of the album's release, the band broke up and Boy George embarked on a solo career, making this the last Culture Club album until 1999's Don't Mind If I Do.

== Track listing ==
All tracks are written by George O'Dowd, Jon Moss, Michael Craig, Roy Hay & Phil Pickett, except where noted.

Side one
No.	Title	Writer(s)	Length
1.	"Move Away"		4:21
2.	"I Pray"		4:00
3.	"Work on Me Baby"	O'Dowd, Moss, Craig, Hay	4:06
4.	"Gusto Blusto"		4:40
5.	"Heaven's Children"		4:44

Side two
No.	Title	Writer(s)	Length
6.	"God Thank You Woman"		4:14
7.	"Reasons"		4:35
8.	"Too Bad"		4:36
9.	"Come Clean"		3:20
10.	"Sexuality"	O'Dowd, Moss, Craig, Hay, Michael Rudetsky	5:28
Total length:			44:04

CD bonus tracks:
No.	Title	Writer(s)	Length
11.	"Move Away" (Extended)		7:25
12.	"God Thank You Woman" (Extended)		7:03
13.	"Sexuality" (Extended)	O'Dowd, Moss, Craig, Hay, Rudetsky	10:34
Total length:			69:06

A Japanese version of From Luxury to Heartache, released on 21 December 2022, also contains the bonus tracks "From Luxury to Heartache" and "Gusto Blusto" (Extended Dance Mix).

== Personnel ==
=== Culture Club ===
- Boy George – vocals
- Mikey Craig – bass guitar
- Roy Hay – guitar, piano, keyboards, sitar, electric sitar
- Jon Moss – percussion, drums

=== Additional musicians ===
- Michael Rudetsky – keyboards
- Phil Pickett – keyboards, background vocals
- Lewis Hahn – recorder
- Helen Terry – backing vocals
- Jocelyn Brown – backing vocals
- David Lasley – backing vocals
- Wendell Morrison – backing vocals
- Ruby Turner – backing vocals

== Production ==
- Arif Mardin – producer
- Lewis Hahn – producer, mixing
- George Marino – mastering
- Jon Moss – digital mixing
- Michael O'Reilly – engineer
- Martin Pearson – engineer
- David Richards – engineer
- Tony Gordon – management

== Charts ==
=== Album ===
Chart (1986)	Peak position
Canadian RPM Albums Chart	34
Dutch Albums Chart	28
German Albums Chart	45
Italian Albums Chart	14
Japanese Albums Chart	13
New Zealand Albums Chart	44
Norwegian Albums Chart	18
Spanish Albums Chart	30
Swedish Albums Chart	13
Swiss Albums Chart	24
UK Albums Chart	10
U.S. Billboard 200	32

=== Singles ===
Single	Chart (1986)	Peak position
"Move Away"	UK Singles Chart	7
"Move Away"	U.S. Adult Contemporary	11
"Move Away"	U.S. Billboard Hot 100	12
"Move Away"	U.S. Hot Dance Club Play	4
"Move Away"	U.S. R&B Chart	87
"God Thank You Woman"	UK Singles Chart	31
"Gusto Blusto"	CAN Singles Chart	24

== Certifications ==
Region	Certification	Certified units/sales
United Kingdom (BPI)	Silver	60,000^{^}
^{^} Shipments figures based on certification alone.

== Release details ==
Country	Date	Label	Format	Catalog
	1986	Virgin	CD	E-40345
			LP	2380
	1998	Virgin	CD	86704
