= I Just Wanna Be Loved =

1998 single by Culture Club

Single by Culture Club

from the album Don't Mind If I Do
- B-side: "Do You Really Want to Hurt Me" (Quivver mix)
- Released: 19 October 1998
- Genre: Pop-reggae; lovers rock
- Length: 4:32 (album version)
- Label: Virgin
- Songwriters: George O'Dowd; Roy Hay; Jon Moss; Mikey Craig
- Producer: Richie Stevens

Culture Club singles chronology
"Gusto Blusto" (1986)	"I Just Wanna Be Loved" (1998)	"Your Kisses Are Charity" (1999)

Music video
- "I Just Wanna Be Loved" on YouTube

"I Just Wanna Be Loved" is a song by English new wave band Culture Club, released as the first single from their fifth album, Don't Mind If I Do (1999). It was serviced to US radio in August 1998 to promote the band's reformation US tour and the live album and compilation VH1 Storytellers/Greatest Moments, but it failed to generate interest. The song was then released commercially in October 1998, by Virgin Records, and entered at number four on the UK Singles Chart during a week when the top five positions were all held by new entries for the first time. It also marked the band's return to the charts after a break of 12 years. Additionally, the song became a top-20 hit in Iceland and on the Eurochart Hot 100 while reaching the top 100 in Australia and Germany.

== Critical reception ==
The song received positive reviews from music critics. AllMusic editor Jose F. Promis noted its "light reggae influence" in his review of the Don't Mind If I Do album. Larry Flick from Billboard magazine wrote, "This fine new recording shows 'em in far better form than on their last two '80s-era albums." He remarked that "set to a shuffling pop-reggae groove somewhat similar to their classic hit 'Do You Really Want to Hurt Me', 'I Just Wanna Be Loved' tingles with warm yet worldly lyrics and a crazy-catchy chorus that you'll be humming for hours after one listen." He added that Boy George "is in peak vocal form, while band-mates Roy Hay, Jon Moss, and Mike Craig play with astonishingly sharp precision." Sarah Davis from Dotmusic described it as "a lovers rock workout that evokes all the best memories of the Eighties", stating that George "is in fine voice". Claudia Connell from News of the World stated, "Their original line-up, including Boy George, storms back with a brilliant pop song that should see the band return to the charts again after 12 years."

== Track listings ==
- Standard CD and cassette single
1. "I Just Wanna Be Loved" – 3:52
2. "I Just Wanna Be Loved" (Magic Man remix) – 4:50 (4:37 in Japan)
3. "Do You Really Want to Hurt Me" (Quivver mix) – 11:26 (11:23 in Japan)
- European CD single
1. "I Just Wanna Be Loved" – 3:52
2. "I Just Wanna Be Loved" (Magic Man remix) – 4:50

== Charts ==
=== Weekly charts ===
Chart (1998)	Peak position
Australia (ARIA)	84
Europe (Eurochart Hot 100)	18
Germany (GfK)	80
Iceland (Íslenski Listinn Topp 40)	20
Scotland Singles (OCC)	7
UK Singles (OCC)	4

=== Year-end charts ===
Chart (1998)	Position
UK Singles (OCC)	98

== Release history ==
Region	Date	Format(s)	Label(s)	Ref.
United States	11 August 1998	Rhythmic contemporary; contemporary hit radio	Virgin	
United Kingdom	19 October 1998	CD; cassette	Virgin	
Japan	21 October 1998	CD	Virgin	
