= Move Away =

1986 single by Culture Club

Single by Culture Club

from the album From Luxury to Heartache
- B-side: "Sexuality"
- Released: 3 March 1986
- Length: 4:22
- Label: Virgin
- Songwriters: Boy George; Jon Moss; Roy Hay; Mikey Craig; Phil Pickett
- Producers: Lew Hahn; Arif Mardin

Culture Club singles chronology
"Love Is Love" (1985)	"Move Away" (1986)	"God Thank You Woman" (1986)

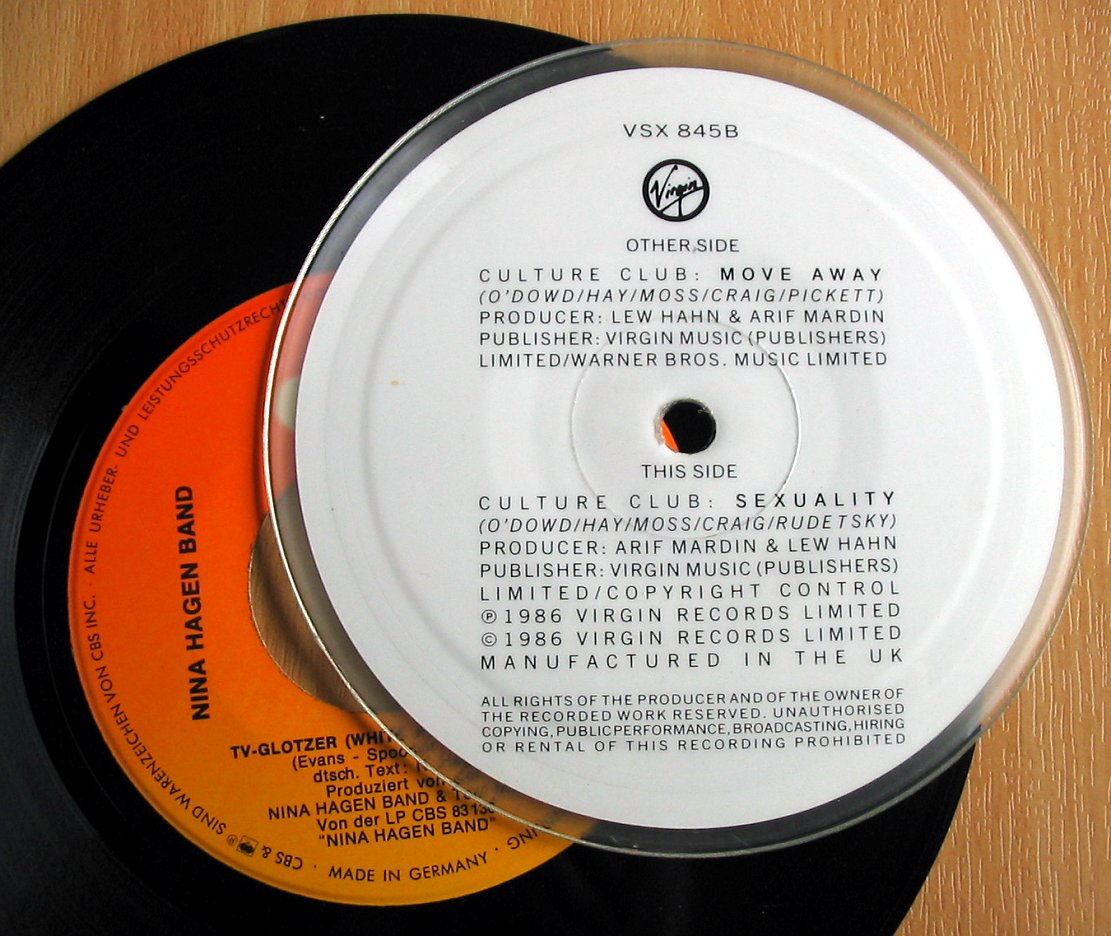
Back of picture disc.

"Move Away" is a song by British band Culture Club, issued as the lead single from their fourth album, From Luxury to Heartache (1986). The song was produced by Lew Hahn and Arif Mardin. Released in March 1986, it became the group's eighth top-10 hit on the UK Singles Chart, peaking at number seven. In the United States, it reached number 12 on the Billboard Hot 100, becoming their last top-40 hit in the US. It also reached the top 10 in various other countries, including Denmark, where it peaked at number three.

== Critical reception ==
On its release, Eleanor Levy of Record Mirror described "Move Away" as a "very clever, radio-orientated pop tune" with a "sparkling production" and "creditable performance". Jerry Smith of Music Week praised it as a "classic pop tune" on which George "delivers a strong vocal over [the] polished production". He added the song "certainly surpasses anything that appeared on the awful Waking Up with the House on Fire". Edwin Pouncey of Sounds was negative in his review, calling it "all sham and no song".

In the US, Cash Box praised the "effervescent production and Boy George’s rich, silky voice." Billboard said it consists of "guileless, breezy hooks."

== Music video ==
The video-clip for the song, which cast Boy George and Jon Moss as silent film-stars racing cars across a black/white movie screen, was filmed at the Brixton Academy, London. George's friend Alice Temple can also be seen in the video.

== Track listings ==
- U.S. / U.K. 7”
1. “Move Away”- 4:10
2. “Sexuality”- 5:40
- U.S. / U.K. 12”
1. “Move Away (Extended Version)”-7:24
2. “Sexuality (Tango Dub Remix Version”- 5:00

== Charts ==
=== Weekly charts ===
Chart (1986)	Peak position
Australia (Kent Music Report)	10
Belgium (Ultratop 50 Flanders)	8
Canada Top Singles (RPM)	15
Canada Adult Contemporary (RPM)	8
Denmark (IFPI)	3
Europe (European Hot 100 Singles)	8
France (SNEP)	47
Ireland (IRMA)	6
Netherlands (Dutch Top 40)	17
Netherlands (Single Top 100)	16
New Zealand (Recorded Music NZ)	16
Norway (VG-lista)	8
Sweden (Sverigetopplistan)	7
Switzerland (Schweizer Hitparade)	18
UK Singles (Official Charts)	7
US Billboard Hot 100	12
US Adult Contemporary (Billboard)	11
US Dance Club Songs (Billboard) remix with "Sexuality"	4
US Dance Singles Sales (Billboard) remix with "Sexuality"	8
US Hot R&B/Hip-Hop Songs (Billboard)	87
US Cash Box Top 100	14
West Germany (GfK)	21

=== Year-end charts ===
Chart (1986)	Position
Australia (Kent Music Report)	81
Belgium (Ultratop)	56
Canada Top Singles (RPM)	86
Europe (European Hot 100 Singles)	85
