= Don't Mind If I Do (Culture Club album) =

Studio album by Culture Club
- Released: 22 November 1999
- Studios: Roundhouse, London; Konk, London; Strongroom, London; The Church, London; Manmade Soul, London; Angel, London; Themis Mobile
- Length: 68:19
- Label: Virgin
- Producers: Roy Hay; Culture Club; Paul Staveley O'Duffy; John Themis; Steve Levine

Culture Club chronology
Greatest Moments – VH1 Storytellers Live (1998)	Don't Mind If I Do (1999)	Culture Club (box set) (2002)

Singles from Don't Mind If I Do
- 1. "I Just Wanna Be Loved" Released: 19 October 1998; 2. "Your Kisses Are Charity" Released: 24 July 1999; 3. "Cold Shoulder" / "Starman" Released: 15 November 1999

Professional ratings
Review scores
Source	Rating
AllMusic	3.5/5 stars

Don't Mind If I Do is the fifth album by the British pop band Culture Club, released in 1999 by Virgin Records. The album was released only in Europe and Japan, though some promo copies also circulated in Australia.

== Overview ==
Don't Mind If I Do was Culture Club's first album of new material in 13 years, after the break-up of the band in 1986 and subsequent reformation in 1998. Numerous producers worked on the project, including Culture Club's original producer Steve Levine (who had produced their first three hit albums). However, despite heavy promotion, the album was a commercial failure, only peaking at No.64 in the UK Albums Chart. The album contains the UK Top 5 single, "I Just Wanna Be Loved", which had been released over a year earlier and was originally included on the band's Greatest Moments compilation. Further singles taken from the album included "Your Kisses Are Charity" which reached Number 25 in the UK, while the next single "Cold Shoulder"/"Starman" stalled at Number 43.

== Track listing ==
No.	Title	Writer(s)	Producer(s)	Length
1.	"I Just Wanna Be Loved"	George O'Dowd, Roy Hay, Michael Craig, Jon Moss	Richie Stevens	4:34
2.	"Cold Shoulder"	O'Dowd, Hay, Craig, Moss, John Themis	Paul Staveley O'Duffy	4:35
3.	"Maybe I'm a Fool"	O'Dowd, Craig, Themis, Ritchie Stevens	Stevens & O'Duffy	4:32
4.	"Sign Language"	O'Dowd, Hay, Craig, Moss, Themis	Stevens, Roy Hay & Culture Club	4:49
5.	"Mirror"	O'Dowd, Hay, Craig, Moss	Stevens, Hay & Culture Club	4:06
6.	"Black Comedy"	O'Dowd, Craig, Themis, Stevens	John Themis	3:52
7.	"Your Kisses Are Charity" (Blouse & Skirt Mix)	O'Dowd, Hay, Craig, Moss, Themis	Stevens, Themis, Hay & Culture Club	4:19
8.	"Weep for the Child"	O'Dowd, Hay, Craig, Moss, Themis	Stevens, Hay & Culture Club	5:00
9.	"See Thru"	O'Dowd, Craig, Hay, Moss, Jonathan Shorten	Steve Levine	4:06
10.	"Strange Voodoo"	O'Dowd, Themis, Stevens	Culture Club	5:15
11.	"Truth Behind Her Smile"	O'Dowd, Hay	Hay & Culture Club	3:04
12.	"Fat Cat"	O'Dowd, Emily Themis	Themis	3:26
13.	"Confidence Trick"	O'Dowd, Hay, Craig, Moss	Hay, Themis & Culture Club	4:57
14.	"Starman"	David Bowie	Hay & Culture Club additional production: Dom T. and John Themis	5:16
15.	"Less Than Perfect"	O'Dowd, Craig, Moss, Hay, Themis	Hay & Culture Club	6:34

1: Recorded & Mixed at Roundhouse Recording Studios, London 1999. 2: Recorded and Mixed at Strongroom Studios, 1999. 3: Strongroom Studios, London 1994. 4: Recorded at Konk Studios, Church Studios, London 1999. 5: Recorded at Konk Studios, London 1999. 6: Recorded & Mixed Themis Mobile Studio. 7: Recorded at Konk Studios, Church Studios, London 1999. 8: Recorded at Konk Studios, London 1999. 9: Produced for Man Made Soul Ltd., Recorded & Mixed at Man Made Soul Studio. 10: Recorded at Konk Studios, London 1999. 11: Recorded at Church Studios, Mixed at Konk Studios, London 1999. 13: Recorded & Mixed @ Konk Studios, London 1999. 14: Additional production and Remix for Drum Promotions, programmed for Strongroom Management. Recorded at Konk Studios, Church Studios & Angel Studios, London. Additional recording & remix at home, London 1999. 15: Recorded & Mixed @ Konk Studios, London 1999

== Personnel ==
Culture Club

- Boy George – vocals
- Mikey Craig – bass guitar, piano, vocal arrangement
- Roy Hay – conductor, guitar, keyboards, vocal arrangements, brass arrangements
- Jon Moss – percussion, drums

Additional musicians

- John Themis – guitar, vocal arrangement
- Tim Cansfield – guitar
- Tony Remy – guitar
- Steve Honest – pedal steel guitar
- Darius Zickus – keyboards, programming
- Kevan Frost – keyboards
- Jonathan Shorten – keyboards
- Sacha Skarbek – keyboards
- Chaz "Da Bat" Kkoshi – Hammond organ
- Richie Stevens – percussion, programming
- Gillian Findlay – violin
- Sophie Langdon – violin
- Julian Leaper – violin
- Roland Roberts – violin
- Paul Wiley – violin
- Rolf Wilson – violin
- Kate Evans – fiddle
- Chris "Snake" Davis – flute, saxophone
- Neil Sidwell – trombone, brass arrangement
- Steve Sidwell – trumpet, flugelhorn, brass
- Paul Spong – trumpet, flugelhorn
- John Thirkell – trumpet
- London Chamber Orchestra – strings
- Robin Smith – arranger, programming, music direction
- Paul Staveley O'Duffy – programming
- Steve Levine – programming
- "Disco Dave" Daniels – programming
- Aidan Love – programming
- David Maurice – programming
- Spencer "Mr. Spee" Graham – programming, backing vocals
- Emily Themis – backing vocals
- Zee Asher – backing vocals
- Angie Brown – backing vocals
- Linda Duggan – backing vocals
- Gina Foster – backing vocals
- Chyna Gordon – backing vocals
- Derek Green – backing vocals
- Mary Pearce – backing vocals
- Paul "Tubbs" Williams – backing vocals
- Derick Johnson – rap

=== Production personnel ===
- John Themis – executive producer, music direction
- Paul Staveley O'Duffy – producer, engineer, mixing engineer
- Dominic "Dom T" Thrupp – producer, remixing
- Roy Hay – producer
- Steven Levine – producer
- Jon Musgrave – engineer, mixing engineer
- Chris Scard – engineer, mixing engineer
- Albert Pinheiro – engineer, assistant engineer
- Pete Lewis – engineer
- Frank Arkwright – mastering, cutting engineer
- "Wing Commander Gill" (Daniel Gilliland) – assistant engineer
- Graham Hogg – assistant engineer
- Ian Rossiter – assistant engineer
- Ryan Tully – assistant engineer
- Roland Herrington – mixing engineer
- Richie Stevens – mixing
- Fiesta Mailing – transcription
- Ryan Art – design
- Paul Cox – photography

== Release details ==
Country	Date	Label	Format	Catalog
UK	1999	Virgin	CD	848666
