= Waking Up with the House on Fire =

Studio album by Culture Club
- Released: 22 October 1984
- Recorded: 1984
- Studios: Red Bus Studios, London
- Genres: New wave; blue-eyed soul
- Length: 36:52
- Labels: Virgin (UK); Epic (US)
- Producer: Steve Levine

Culture Club chronology
Colour by Numbers (1983)	Waking Up with the House on Fire (1984)	From Luxury to Heartache (1986)

Singles from Waking Up with the House on Fire
- 1. "The War Song" Released: 24 September 1984; 2. "The Medal Song" Released: 19 November 1984 (UK, Japan, Europe); 3. "Mistake No. 3" Released: 9 December 1984 (US, Canada, Australia, Africa)

Waking Up with the House on Fire is the third album by the English pop band Culture Club, released on 22 October 1984. The album peaked at number two on the UK Albums Chart, becoming the band's third top five album.

== Overview ==
The first single, "The War Song", hit #2 in the UK and went Top 20 in the US in late 1984. While Waking Up with the House on Fire became the band's third consecutive Platinum seller in both the UK and the US, it was less successful than the group's previous album, Colour by Numbers (1983). It was certified gold or platinum in many countries, even earning Double Platinum status in Canada.

The other two singles were "The Medal Song" (UK No. 32), (with its B-side, "Don't Go Down That Street" being released as a single from a subsequent EP in Japan but only reaching No. 69 in the charts) and "Mistake No. 3" (US No. 33). In Mexico, "Don't Talk About It" was released as a single in mid 1985 and charted at No.#8. Billboard called "Mistake No. 3" "slow, lyrical musings on human weakness" that is "an unusually sad song" for Culture Club.

== Reception ==
Professional ratings
Review scores
Source	Rating
AllMusic	2/5 stars
Robert Christgau	B
Rolling Stone	2/5 stars
The Rolling Stone Album Guide	1.5/5 stars
Smash Hits	4/10 stars
Spin Alternative Record Guide	2/10

Reviews for Waking Up with the House on Fire have been fairly negative. In Smash Hits magazine, reviewer Tom Hibbert stated the album was "a disaster of mediocrity" and that the majority of the tracks were "a characterless stodge of bland blue-eyed soul, slouching rhythms, pedestrian horns and nonchalant vocals...".

AllMusic's Lindsay Planer retrospectively rated the album two out of five stars. He noted that "overexposure in the media, the ever-changing tides and trends of pop music, and, quite frankly, a less than laudable collection of songs resulted in [the album] receiving a less than enthusiastic response." He also explained that it "was in no way aided by the irony-laden yet undeniable banality of the emphasis track [...], "The War Song"." However, he stated: "Two of the more interesting cuts are the vintage R&B "Crime Time" and the upbeat and soulful "Mannequin," blending Beach Boys-esque vocal harmonies with a distinctly Carolina beach and shag flavour."

Robert Christgau rated it a B, stating: "Since I had even less use for the dismissive because-he-wears-dresses theory than for the ridiculous new-Smokey analysis, I could never figure out [Boy George's] means of commercial propulsion". He also stated the band's commercial decline "calls for concerted protest – which might be easier to whip up if the latest album weren't part three of more-of-the-same."

== Track listing ==
All tracks are written by Culture Club.

Side one
No.	Title	Length
1.	"Dangerous Man"	4:14
2.	"The War Song"	4:13
3.	"Unfortunate Thing"	3:08
4.	"Crime Time"	2:59
5.	"Mistake No. 3"	4:36

Side two
No.	Title	Length
6.	"The Dive"	3:47
7.	"The Medal Song"	4:15
8.	"Don't Talk About It"	3:17
9.	"Mannequin"	2:53
10.	"Hello Goodbye"	3:25
Total length:		36:52

2003 reissue bonus tracks
No.	Title	Length
11.	"La Cancion de Guerra" (Spanish version of "The War Song" & its original B-side)	4:04
12.	"Love Is Love" (from Electric Dreams)	3:51
13.	"The Dream" (from Electric Dreams)	2:29
14.	"Don't Go Down That Street" (B-side to "The Medal Song")	6:34
Total length:		53:50

- The Chilean cassette edition starts with an extended version of "The War Song".

== Personnel ==
Culture Club

- Boy George – vocals
- Roy Hay – acoustic piano, keyboards, guitars, sitar, electric sitar
- Mikey Craig – bass guitar
- Jon Moss – drums, percussion

Additional musicians

- Phil Pickett – keyboards, backing vocals
- Steve Grainger – saxophones
- Kenneth McGregor – trombone
- Ron Williams – trumpet
- Helen Terry – backing vocals
- Imogen Exton – backing vocals
- Derek Green – backing vocals
- Alice Kemp – backing vocals
- Andriana Loizou – backing vocals
- Alanda Marchant – backing vocals
- Nancy Peppers – backing vocals
- Chris Rainbow – backing vocals
- Louis Rogers – backing vocals
- Martin Sunley – backing vocals
- Tara Thomas – backing vocals
- Clare Torry – backing vocals

== Production ==
- Steve Levine – producer, digital mixing
- Gordon Milne – engineer
- Peter Lees – assistant engineer
- Jon Moss – digital mixing
- Ray Allington – hair stylist
- Kim Bowen – stylist
- Stevie Hughes – photography, make-up
- Connie Jude – cover and rear sleeve illustration

== Charts ==
=== Weekly charts ===
Chart (1984–1985)	Peak position
Australian Kent Music Report Albums Chart	2
Canadian RPM Albums Chart	6
Dutch Mega Albums Chart	7
French SNEP Albums Chart	2
Italian Albums Chart	7
Japanese Oricon LP Chart	4
New Zealand Albums Chart	15
Norwegian VG-lista Albums Chart	9
Spanish Albums Chart	4
Swedish Albums Chart	19
Swiss Albums Chart	21
UK Albums Chart	2
US Billboard 200	26
West German Media Control Albums Chart	22

=== Year-end charts ===
Chart (1984)	Position
Australian Albums Chart	68
Canadian Albums Chart	30
French Albums Chart	61
Italian Albums Chart	60
Japanese Albums Chart (Oricon)	60
UK Albums Chart	54
Chart (1985)	Position
Canadian Albums Chart	89
Japanese Albums Chart	113

== Certifications ==
Certifications and sales for Waking Up with the House on Fire
Region	Certification	Certified units/sales
Canada (Music Canada)	2× Platinum	200,000^{^}
France (SNEP)	Gold	100,000^{*}
Japan	—	229,770
New Zealand (RMNZ)	Platinum	15,000^{^}
United Kingdom (BPI)	Platinum	499,000
United States (RIAA)	Platinum	1,000,000^{^}
^{*} Sales figures based on certification alone.^{^} Shipments figures based on certification alone.

== Release details ==
Country	Date	Label	Format	Catalog
	1984	Virgin	CD	91392
			LP	39881
	1996		CD	86181
	2003		CD	92406
